= National Register of Historic Places listings in Dallas County, Alabama =

Location of Dallas County in Alabama

Dallas County, Alabama, United States, has 34 properties and districts listed on the National Register of Historic Places, including two National Historic Landmarks. There is also one former listing.

Latitude and longitude coordinates are provided for many National Register properties and districts; these locations may be seen together in an online map.

This National Park Service list is complete through NPS recent listings posted August 28, 2026.

== Current listings ==
	Name on the Register	Image	Date listed	Location	City or town	Description
1	Adams Grove Presbyterian Church	Adams Grove Presbyterian Church	June 5, 1986 (#86001239)	Southern side of Cahaba-Greenville Rd. 32°16′20″N 87°01′51″W	Sardis	Wooden-framed Presbyterian church, built in the Greek Revival style in 1853.
2	Antique Store	Antique Store	January 29, 1987 (#86003662)	Off State Route 22; 32°39′32″N 86°55′24″W	Plantersville	
3	Brown Chapel African Methodist Episcopal Church	Brown Chapel African Methodist Episcopal Church	February 4, 1982 (#82002009)	410 Martin Luther King, Jr. St. 32°24′45″N 87°00′58″W	Selma	Brick African Methodist Episcopal church, built in 1908. Known for its association with the Civil Rights Movement and Selma to Montgomery marches.
4	Burwell-Dinkins-Anderson House		June 17, 2022 (#100007801)	700 L.L. Anderson Ave. 32°25′06″N 87°01′44″W	Selma	
5	Cahaba	Cahaba	May 8, 1973 (#73000341)	11 miles (18 km) southwest of Selma at the junction of the Cahaba and Alabama Rivers; 32°19′07″N 87°05′57″W	Cahaba	First permanent state capital of Alabama (1820–1825); today a ghost town.
6	Carlowville Historic District	Carlowville Historic District	January 18, 1978 (#78000487)	17 miles (27 km) south of Selma on State Route 89; 32°05′15″N 87°02′01″W	Carlowville	
7	Christian Church and Parsonage	Christian Church and Parsonage	January 29, 1987 (#86003664)	Off State Route 22; 32°39′24″N 86°55′29″W	Plantersville	
8	Dallas County Courthouse	Dallas County Courthouse	June 20, 1975 (#75000310)	109 Union St. 32°24′18″N 87°01′33″W	Selma	Three-story brick building in the Greek Revival style, built as the Central Masonic Institute in 1847. It later served as the county courthouse and as a hospital.
9	Doctor's Office		January 29, 1987 (#86003663)	Junction of 1st Ave. north of Oak St. and 1st Ave. 32°41′03″N 86°55′24″W	Plantersville	
10	Driskell-Martin House	Driskell-Martin House	January 29, 1987 (#86003661)	Northwestern corner of the junction of Cherry St. and 1st Ave. 32°39′36″N 86°55′26″W	Plantersville	
11	First Baptist Church	First Baptist Church	September 20, 1979 (#79000383)	709 Martin Luther King, Jr. St. 32°24′51″N 87°01′04″W	Selma	Historically African American Baptist church, built in the Gothic Revival style in 1894. Known for its association with the Civil Rights Movement.
12	J. Bruce Hain House	J. Bruce Hain House	November 30, 2001 (#01001295)	5826 State Route 41; 32°17′17″N 86°59′14″W	Sardis	
13	Icehouse Historic District	Icehouse Historic District	June 28, 1990 (#90000886)	Roughly bounded by Jefferson Davis and Dallas Aves., Union and Lapsley Sts., and Valley Creek; 32°24′39″N 87°01′54″W	Selma	
14	Marshall's Grove	Marshall's Grove	February 4, 1982 (#82002010)	State Route 22; 32°27′58″N 87°00′23″W	Selma	
15	John Tyler Morgan House	John Tyler Morgan House	September 27, 1972 (#72000159)	719 Tremont St. 32°24′49″N 87°01′39″W	Selma	
16	Northern Heights Presbyterian Church		June 24, 2022 (#100007813)	1575 Marie Foster St. 32°25′15″N 87°00′52″W	Selma	
17	Old Town Historic District	Old Town Historic District	May 3, 1978 (#78000486)	Roughly bounded by the Alabama River, Jefferson Davis Ave., Pettus, Broad, and Franklin Sts.; also Jefferson Davis Ave.; an area roughly bounded by Broad, Dallas, U.S. Route 80, and Franklin; Selma Ave.; and Franklin St. 32°24′37″N 87°01′31″W	Selma	Boundaries after the "also" represent a boundary increase of December 15, 2003
18	Edmund Pettus Bridge	Edmund Pettus Bridge	February 27, 2013 (#13000281)	U.S. Route 80 across the Alabama River; 32°24′20″N 87°01′07″W	Selma	
19	Wesley Plattenburg House	Wesley Plattenburg House	February 3, 1993 (#92001827)	601 Washington St. 32°24′50″N 87°01′20″W	Selma	
20	Pleasant Hill Presbyterian Church	Pleasant Hill Presbyterian Church	April 22, 1999 (#99000465)	0.2 miles (0.32 km) east of the junction of County Roads 7 and 12; 32°09′53″N 86°54′30″W	Pleasant Hill	Wooden-framed Presbyterian church, built in the Greek Revival style in 1851.
21	Riverdale	Riverdale	September 10, 1979 (#79000384)	Northeast of Selma on River Rd. 32°26′02″N 86°52′11″W	Selma	
22	Riverview Historic District	Riverview Historic District	June 28, 1990 (#90000887)	Roughly bounded by Selma Ave., Satterfield and Lapsley Sts., and the Alabama River; 32°24′11″N 87°01′51″W	Selma	
23	St. Luke's Episcopal Church	St. Luke's Episcopal Church	March 25, 1982 (#82002008)	Beech St. (Cahaba Rd.) near intersection with Capitol Ave. 32°19′09″N 87°06′19″W	Cahaba	Wooden-framed Episcopal church, built in the Carpenter Gothic style in 1854.
24	St. Paul's Episcopal Church	St. Paul's Episcopal Church	March 25, 1975 (#75000311)	210 Lauderdale St. 32°24′31″N 87°01′18″W	Selma	Brick Episcopal church, built in the Gothic Revival style in 1875.
25	Selma University Historic District	Selma University Historic District	July 14, 2023 (#100009126)	1501 Boynton St. 32°25′13″N 87°01′54″W	Selma	
26	Marcus Meyer Skinner House	Marcus Meyer Skinner House	August 27, 1987 (#87001418)	2612 Summerfield Rd. 32°26′15″N 87°02′01″W	Selma	
27	Street Manual Training School	Street Manual Training School	July 28, 1999 (#99000891)	263 County Road 38; 32°06′49″N 87°03′35″W	Richmond and Minter	
28	Sturdivant Hall	Sturdivant Hall	January 18, 1973 (#73000340)	713 Mabry St. 32°24′47″N 87°01′44″W	Selma	Greek Revival style mansion designed by Thomas Helm Lee and completed in 1856.
29	Summerfield District	Summerfield District	March 1, 1982 (#82002011)	Selma-Summerfield and Marion Rds., Centenary and College Sts. 32°31′03″N 87°02′45″W	Summerfield	
30	Tabernacle Baptist Church	Tabernacle Baptist Church	July 10, 2013 (#13000469)	1431 Broad St. 32°25′11″N 87°01′28″W	Selma	
31	Todd House	Todd House	January 29, 1987 (#86003665)	Southern side of Oak St. west of 1st Ave. 32°39′21″N 86°55′52″W	Plantersville	
32	U.S. Post Office Building	U.S. Post Office Building	March 26, 1976 (#76000322)	908 Alabama Ave. 32°24′27″N 87°01′15″W	Selma	Beaux-Arts style Federal Government building designed by James Knox Taylor and completed in 1909.
33	Valley Creek Presbyterian Church	Valley Creek Presbyterian Church	May 28, 1976 (#76000323)	North of Selma on Valley Creek Rd. 32°28′14″N 87°01′28″W	Valley Grande	Brick Presbyterian church, built in the Greek Revival style in 1857.
34	Water Avenue Historic District	Water Avenue Historic District	December 26, 1972 (#72000160)	Water Ave.; also Water Ave. bounded by Lauderdale, MLK Boulevard, Beech Creek, and the Alabama River; 32°24′27″N 87°01′00″W	Selma	Second set of boundaries represents boundary increases approved July 7, 2005 and June 25, 2021

== Former listings ==
	Name on the Register	Image	Date listed	Date removed	Location	City or town	Description
1	Sullivan and Richie Jean Jackson House	Sullivan and Richie Jean Jackson House	January 18, 2014 (#13001033)	January 3, 2025	1416 Lapsley Ave. 32°25′09″N 87°01′52″W	Selma	

== See also ==
- List of National Historic Landmarks in Alabama
- National Register of Historic Places listings in Alabama
