= Valley Creek Presbyterian Church =

Historic church in Alabama, United States

- U.S. National Register of Historic Places
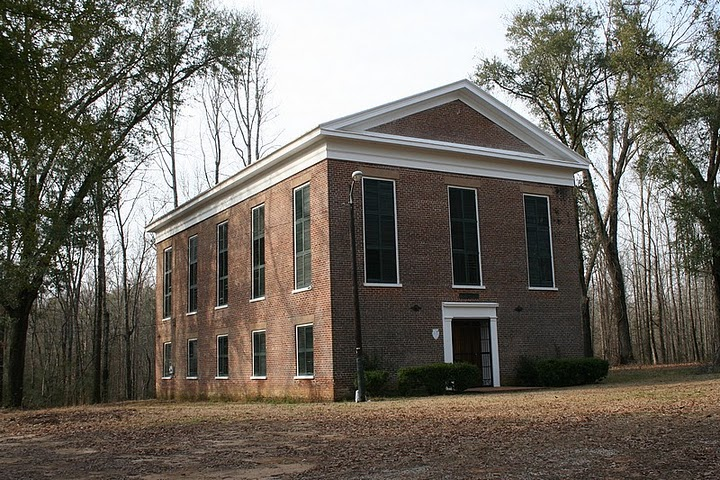
- Valley Creek Presbyterian in 2008

- Location within Alabama Location within the United States
- Nearest city: Valley Grande, Alabama
- Coordinates: 32°28′14″N 87°1′28″W
- Area: 4.1 acres (1.7 ha)
- Built: 1857–1859
- Architectural style: Greek Revival
- NRHP reference No.: 76000323
- Added to NRHP: May 28, 1976

Valley Creek Presbyterian Church is a historic Presbyterian church in Valley Grande, Alabama, United States. The two-story red brick church building was built in the Greek Revival style from 1857 to 1859. The sanctuary and a mezzanine level, formerly a slave gallery, are located on the upper floor. It was added to the National Register of Historic Places on May 28, 1976, due to its architectural significance.

== History ==
The Valley Creek Presbyterian congregation was established in 1816 by eight families from Mecklenburg County, North Carolina, making it the oldest Presbyterian congregation in Dallas County and one of the first established in what would become Alabama in 1819. The founding family members were former congregants of the Rocky River Presbyterian Church, organized in 1751. The Valley Creek Presbyterian congregation originally met in a wooden building, which was replaced by this brick structure.
