= Henry Cochran =

American tax collector, deputy marshall, postman and politician

Henry A. Cochran was a state legislator in Alabama. He served in the Alabama House of Representatives for three terms from 1871 to 1875. He was one of the representatives for Dallas County, Alabama in 1873. He also served as tax collector, deputy U.S. marshal, and postmaster in Selma.

He was a captain with the 19th Regiment Illinois Volunteers Infantry.

In October 1869 he was elected tax collector. He also served as a Deputy U.S. Marshall. He was appointed postmaster in Selma, Alabama.

Rev. Richard Myhalyk, S.S.E. noted Cochran in an October 10, 2021 sermon at the Our Lady Queen of Peace Church in Selma. He is listed on a memorial of black legislators who served in Alabama from 1868-1879.

== See also ==
- African American officeholders from the end of the Civil War until before 1900
