= Sturdivant Hall =

Historic house in Alabama, United States

- U.S. National Register of Historic Places
- U.S. Historic district – Contributing property
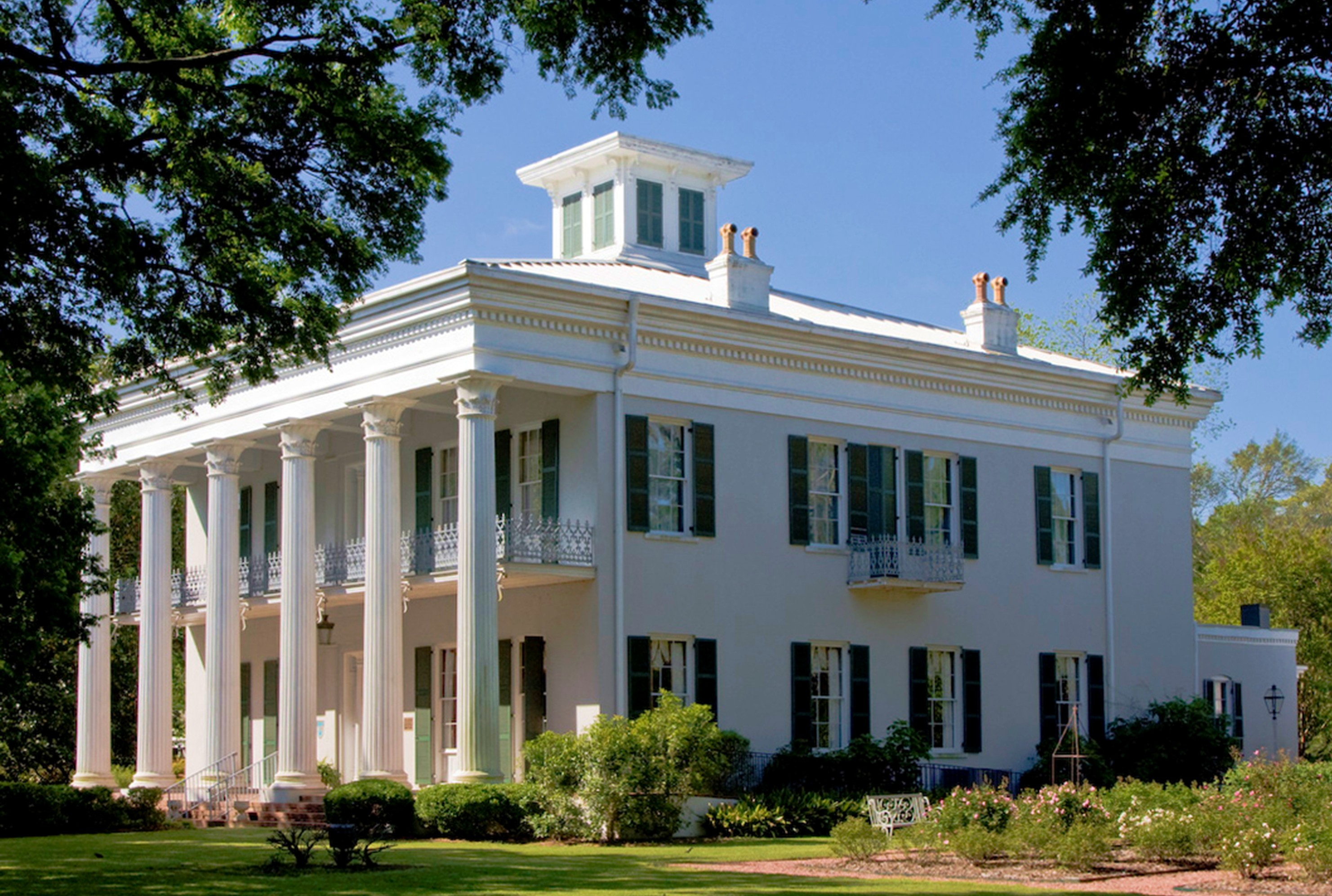
- Sturdivant Hall in 2009

- Location within Alabama Location within the United States
- Location: 713 Mabry Street; Selma, Alabama
- Coordinates: 32°24′47″N 87°1′44″W
- Area: 1 acre (0.40 ha)
- Built: 1852-56
- Architect: Thomas Helm Lee
- Architectural style: Greek Revival
- Part of: Old Town Historic District (ID78000486)
- NRHP reference No.: 73000340

Significant dates
- Added to NRHP: January 18, 1973
- Designated CP: May 3, 1978

Sturdivant Hall, also known as the Watts-Parkman-Gillman House, is a historic Greek Revival mansion and house museum in Selma, Alabama, United States. Completed in 1856, it was designed by Thomas Helm Lee for Colonel Edward T. Watts. It was added to the National Register of Historic Places on January 18, 1973, due to its architectural significance. Edward Vason Jones, known for his architectural work on the interiors at the White House during the 1960s and 70s, called it one of the finest Greek Revival antebellum mansions in the Southeast.

== History ==
Construction of what is now known as Sturdivant Hall began in 1852, but was not completely finished until 1856. Following completion, Edward Watts and his family lived in the house until 1864, when the house was sold and the family moved to Texas. The house was purchased from Watts by John McGee Parkman, a local banker, for the sum of $65,000 on February 12, 1864. Following the end of the American Civil War, Parkman was made president of the First National Bank of Selma. The bank engaged in cotton speculation and accumulated huge losses. The military governor of Alabama, Wager Swayne, had his Reconstruction authorities take possession of the bank and arrest Parkman. He was imprisoned at the county jail at Cahaba. Assisted by his friends, Parkman attempted to escape from the prison on May 23, 1867, but was killed.

The house was sold at auction for $12,500 (~$272,783 in 2024) in January 1870 to Emile Gillman, a prominent Selma merchant. The Gillman family owned the house until 1957, when it was sold to the City of Selma for $75,000 (~$638,467 in 2024). A large share of the money for buying the house came through a $50,000 bequest from the estate of Robert Daniel Sturdivant, with a provision for setting up a museum in the city. The mansion was turned into a house museum after the purchase and named in honor of Sturdivant. The property continues to be maintained into the present day by the City of Selma, Dallas County, and the Sturdivant Museum Association.

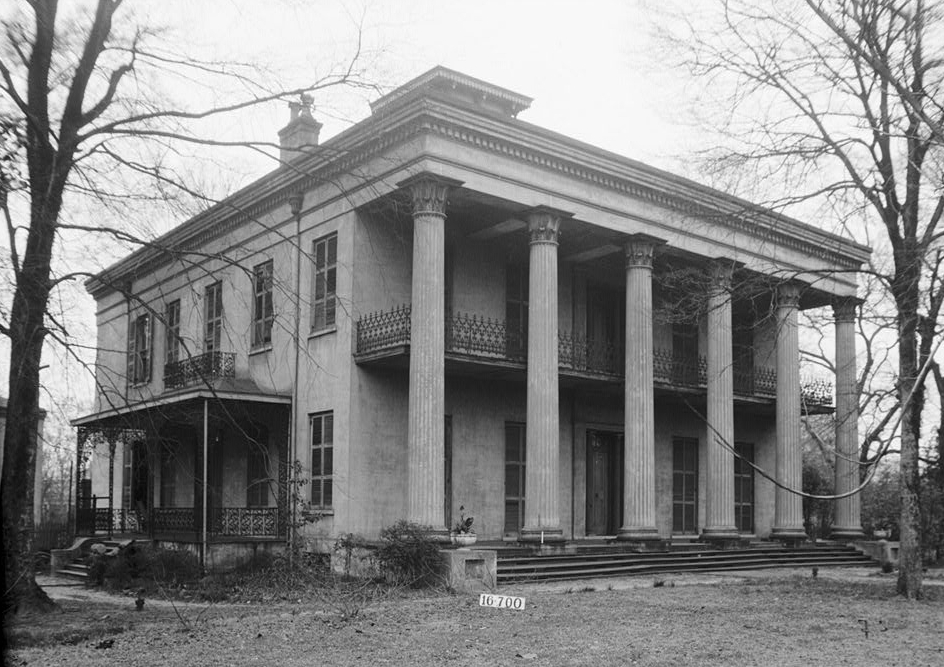
Sturdivant Hall, front facade in 1934.

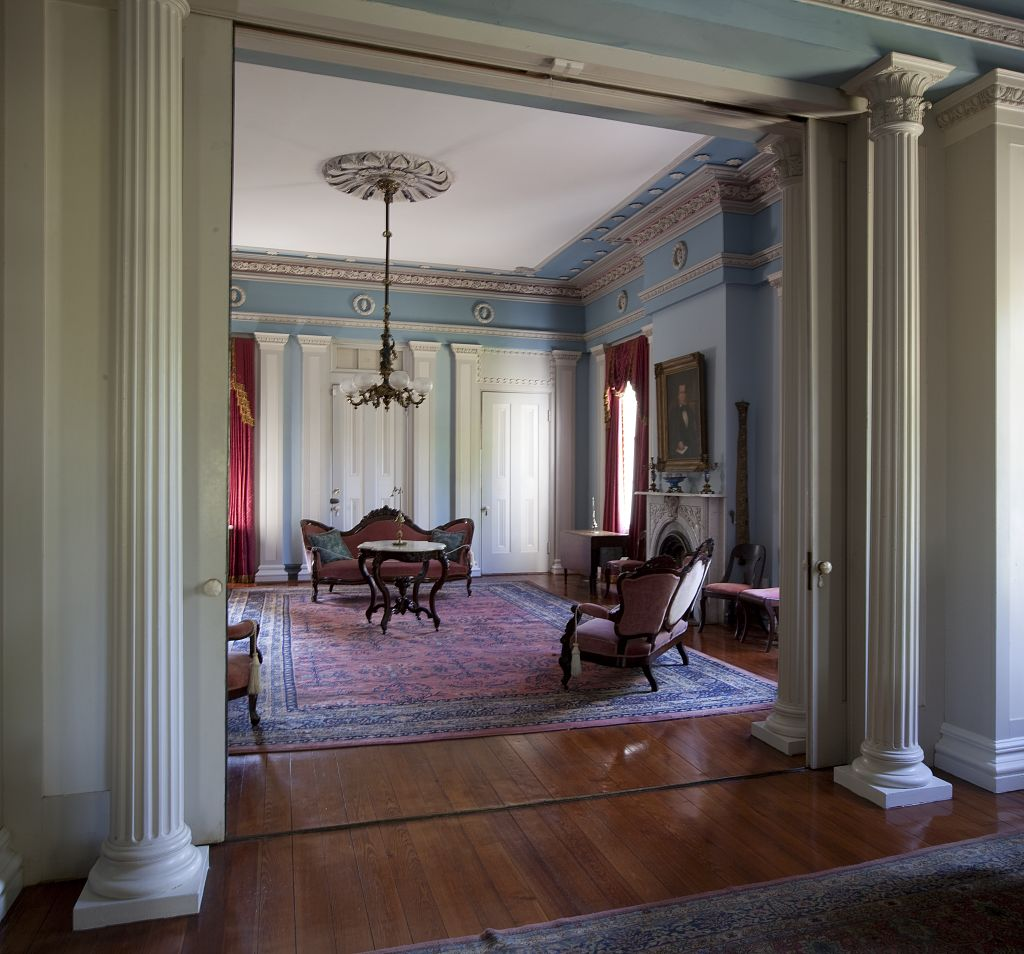
View from drawing room into rear parlor

== Architecture ==
The house is a two-story brick structure, stuccoed to give the appearance of ashlar. The front facade features a monumentally scaled hexastyle portico utilizing 30-foot (9.1 m)-tall Corinthian columns. The front portico is accessed from the second floor by a cantilevered balcony with an intricate cast-iron railing. Identical front doorways on both levels feature elaborate Greek Revival door surrounds with full Corinthian columns to each side of the door.

The side elevations of the house feature a small cantilevered balcony on one side and a wide first floor porch surmounted by another balcony on the other. Both make use of elaborate cast-iron structural and decorative elements. The rear elevation is dominated by a monumental distyle in antis portico with two Doric columns. A kitchen, smokehouse and two-story servants' quarters are set at right angles to the rear portico, forming a semi-enclosed courtyard to the rear of the house. A low pyramidal hipped roof covers the main block of the house, as well as the front and rear porticoes. It is crowned by a small cupola.

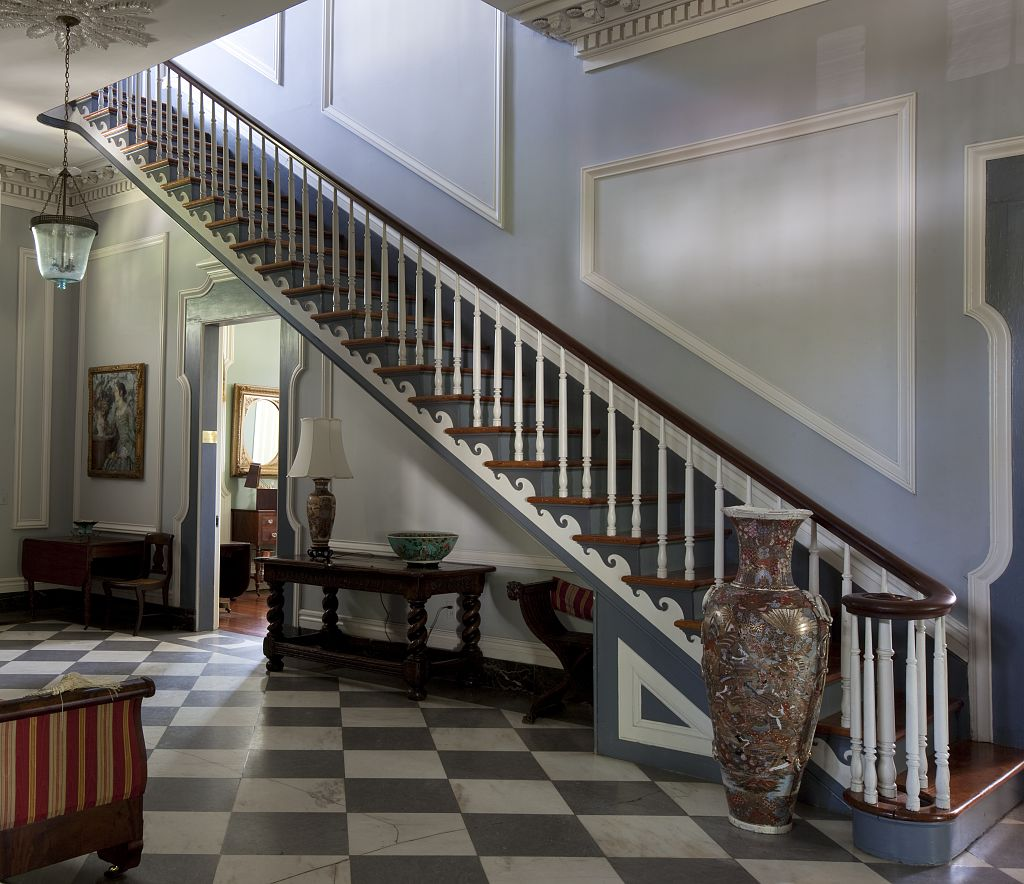
First floor hall and cantilevered staircase

The interiors of Sturdivant Hall reflect the growing taste for opulence in the United States during the 1850s. The first floor has elaborate plasterwork and millwork throughout, with the drawing room and ladies parlor being the most detailed. They both feature door surrounds with Corinthian columns and are ringed by paneled pilasters, topped by plaster cornices. The main entrance for the first floor enters a L-shaped front hall, with a cantilevered staircase in the side portion of the hall. Other rooms on the first floor are the dining room, gentleman's parlor, and the warming room. The second floor houses a T-shaped hall and four bedrooms. From there, another cantilevered stair leads to an attic-level landing. From this landing a spiral stair winds around a central pole up to the cupola.

== Folklore ==
The house has at least one ghost story associated with it. Sturdivant Hall is featured in a short story by Kathryn Tucker Windham, in her 13 Alabama Ghosts and Jeffrey. The story, "The Return of the Ruined Banker", involves John Parkman and the purported return of his ghost to the house after his death.

== See also ==
- National Register of Historic Places listings in Dallas County, Alabama
- Reportedly haunted locations in Alabama
