= Adams Grove Presbyterian Church =

Historic church in Alabama, United States

- U.S. National Register of Historic Places
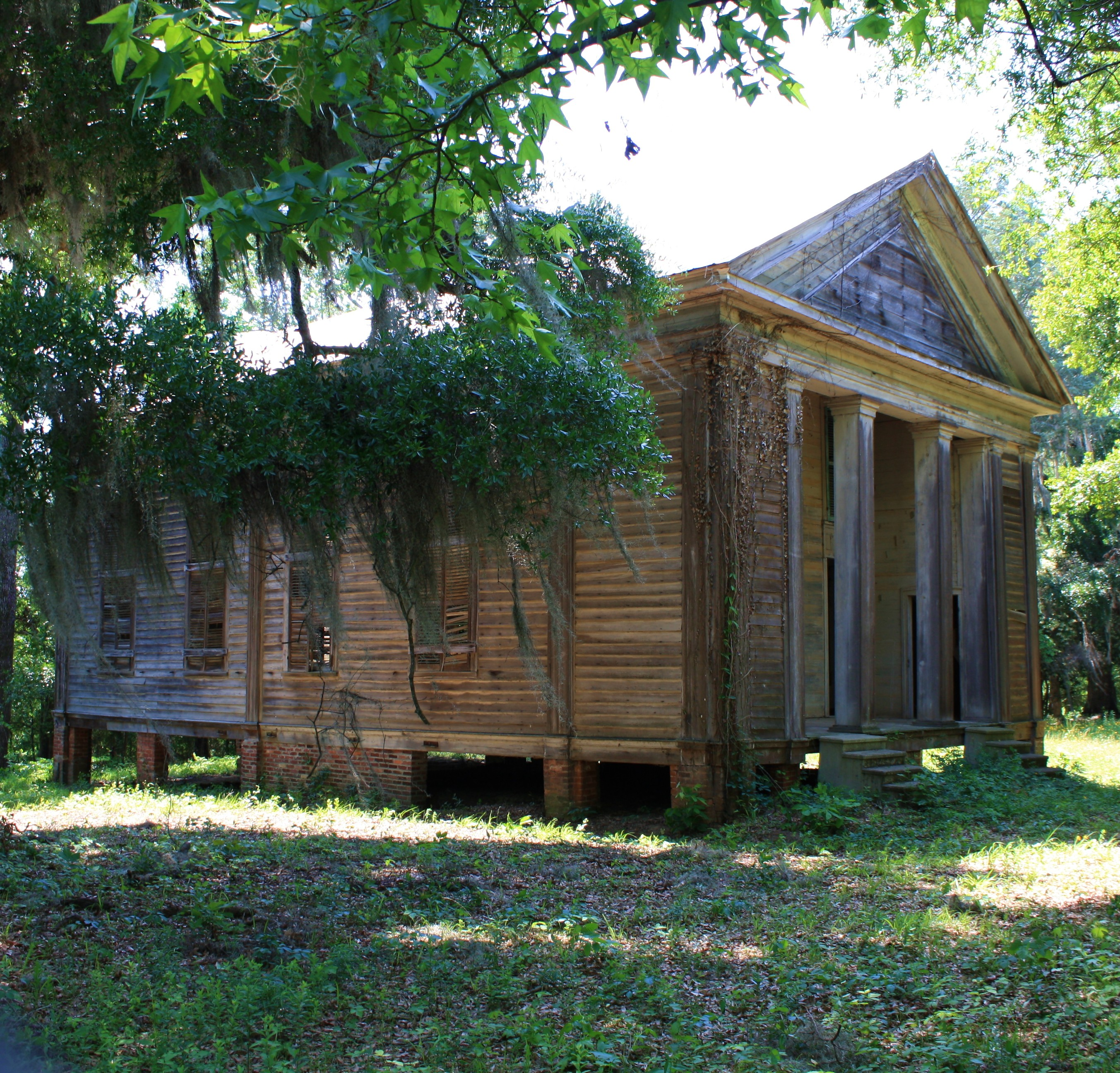
- Adams Grove in 2011

- Location within Alabama Location within the United States
- Nearest city: Sardis, Alabama
- Coordinates: 32°16′19″N 87°1′50″W
- Area: 7.8 acres (3.2 ha)
- Built: 1853
- Architectural style: Greek Revival
- NRHP reference No.: 86001239
- Added to NRHP: June 5, 1986

Adams Grove Presbyterian Church is a historic Greek Revival-style church building in rural Dallas County, Alabama, United States, near the community of Sardis. Built in 1853, it features a distyle-in-antis type portico with box columns. No longer actively used by a church congregation, the building is now privately owned. It was placed on the National Register of Historic Places on June 5, 1986.
