= Michael Johnson (defensive end) =

American football player (born 1987)

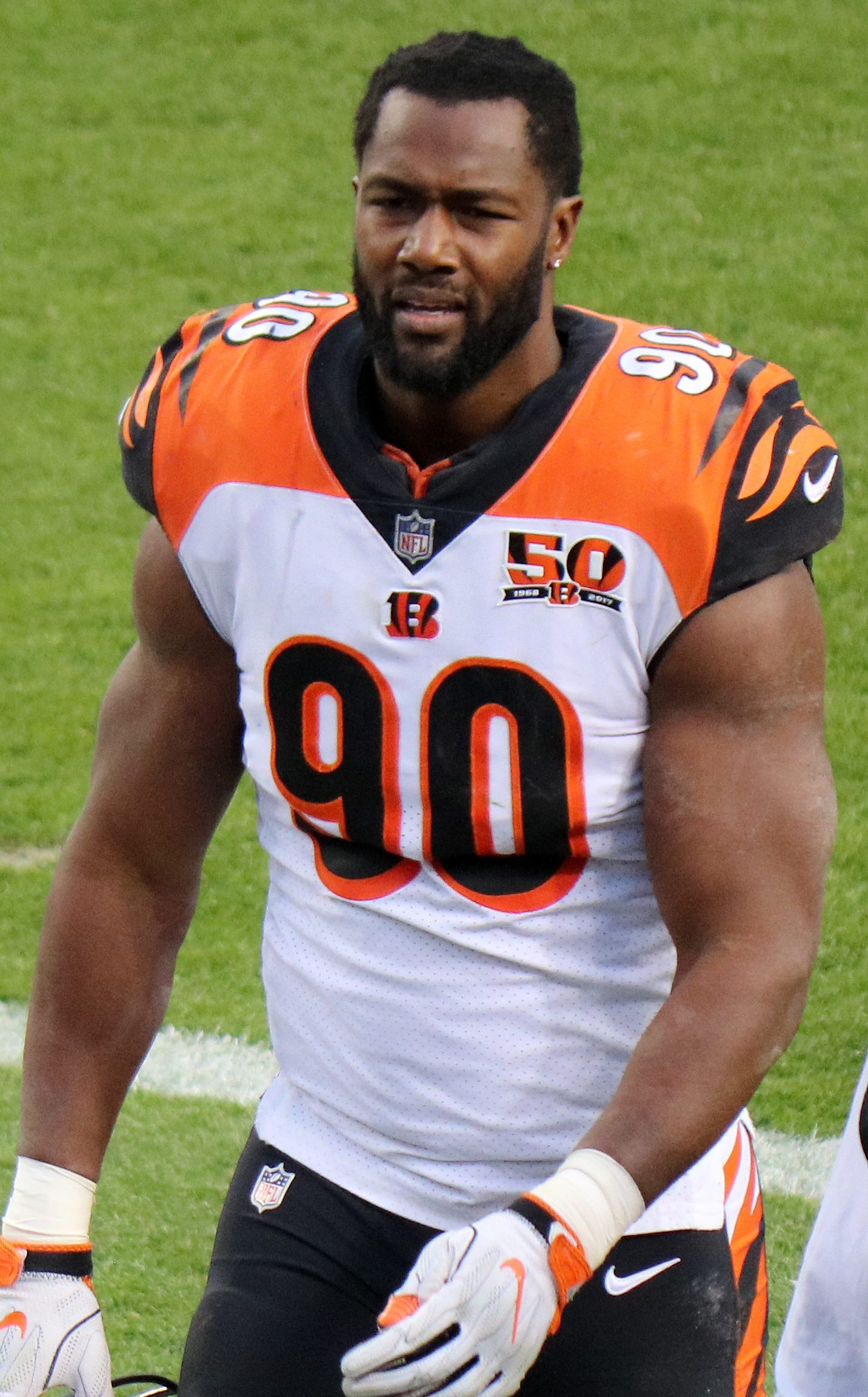
- Johnson with the Cincinnati Bengals in 2017

No. 93, 90
- Position: Defensive end

Personal information
- Born: February 7, 1987 (age 39); Selma, Alabama, U.S.
- Listed height: 6 ft 7 in (2.01 m)
- Listed weight: 280 lb (127 kg)

Career information
- High school: Dallas County (Plantersville, Alabama)
- College: Georgia Tech
- NFL draft: 2009: 3rd round, 70th overall pick

Career history
- Cincinnati Bengals (2009–2013); Tampa Bay Buccaneers (2014); Cincinnati Bengals (2015–2018)

Awards and highlights
- First-team All-American (2008); First-team All-ACC (2008)

Career NFL statistics
- Total tackles: 398
- Sacks: 44.5
- Forced fumbles: 8
- Fumble recoveries: 4
- Interceptions: 4
- Defensive touchdowns: 1
- Stats at Pro Football Reference

Michael David Johnson (born February 7, 1987) is an American former professional football player who was a defensive end in the National Football League (NFL). He was selected by the Cincinnati Bengals in the third round of the 2009 NFL draft and also played for the Tampa Bay Buccaneers. He played college football for the Georgia Tech Yellow Jackets.

== Early life ==
Johnson played high school football at Dallas County High School in Plantersville, Alabama. Playing tight end, Johnson was the team captain and MVP for coach Richard Bush. As a junior, he had 25 receptions for 300 yards and three touchdowns. He caught 42 passes for 650 yards and six touchdowns as a senior while making 92 tackles and 14 sacks on defense. Johnson was also an outstanding basketball player, who averaged 16 points and 10 rebounds as a junior. Johnson graduated valedictorian of his class.

== College career ==
As a senior at Georgia Tech, Johnson, in 2008, ended the regular season with Recorded 46 tackles (28 solos) as he led the team and finished third in the conference with nine sacks and 17.5 stops for losses and two forced fumbles. He was voted as an AFCA coaches First-team All-American with the likes of Brian Orakpo and Terrence Cody. He also garnered first-team All-ACC honors as well as numerous other accolades.

In 2007, Johnson played in 13 games and started one. He had 21 tackle (11 solo) and six went for losses. He had four sacks and forced three fumbles and recovered one. He also blocked two kicks. The previous season, 2006, he played in and started all 12 games and had 34 tackles (25 solo) and six were for a loss. He recorded five sacks and forced three fumbles and broke up two passes. In 2005, as a true freshman, he played in 11 games and had 5 solo tackles and one assisted for a total of six tackles, one going for a loss. He also recorded one sack and forced one fumble.

On May 2, 2015, after six seasons in the NFL, Johnson officially earned his degree from Georgia Tech.

== Professional career ==
Pre-draft measurables
Height	Weight	Arm length	Hand span	40-yard dash	10-yard split	20-yard split	20-yard shuttle	Three-cone drill	Vertical jump	Broad jump	Bench press	Wonderlic
6 ft 6 7/8 in (2.00 m)	266 lb (121 kg)	34 3/8 in (0.87 m)	10 1/4 in (0.26 m)	4.61 s	1.54 s	2.66 s	4.37 s	7.42 s	38.5 in (0.98 m)	10 ft 8 in (3.25 m)	28 reps	27
All values from NFL Combine/Georgia Tech's Pro Day

=== Cincinnati Bengals (first stint) ===
Johnson was not selected in the first round of the 2009 NFL draft where many analysts predicted he would go, instead falling into the third round and being picked 70th overall by the Bengals. During an interview, Johnson was mentioned by head coach Marvin Lewis as maybe being "one of the best pass rushers he has ever worked with." Before the 2010 season, the Bengals announced that Johnson would be moved to outside linebacker.

In 2012, Johnson accumulated 52 tackles, 35 solo, and 11.5 sacks. He also had one interception and one force fumble.

The Bengals placed their non-exclusive franchise tag on Johnson on March 1, 2013.

=== Tampa Bay Buccaneers ===
Johnson signed a five-year, $43.98 million contract with the Tampa Bay Buccaneers on March 11, 2014. Johnson's debut season for the Buccaneers was marred with injuries consistently the entire year. In the 2014 season, he recorded 27 combined tackles, 4.0 quarterback sacks, and two forced fumbles.

On March 11, 2015, exactly one year to the day he signed with the Buccaneers, Johnson was released. The move saved $2 million in cap space despite the loss of $7 million in guaranteed money that the team still had to pay.

=== Cincinnati Bengals (second stint) ===
On March 15, 2015, Johnson re-joined his former team, signing a four-year, $24 million contract with the Bengals.

In Week 5 of the 2018 season, Johnson recorded a 22-yard pick-six in the 27–17 victory over the Miami Dolphins.

== NFL career statistics ==
Legend
**Bold**	Career high

=== Regular season ===
Year	Team	Games		Tackles					Interceptions					Fumbles			
Year	Team	GP	GS	Cmb	Solo	Ast	Sck	TFL	Int	Yds	TD	Lng	PD	FF	FR	Yds	TD
2009	CIN	**16**	0	17	11	6	3.0	4	0	0	0	0	5	0	0	0	0
2010	CIN	**16**	10	35	26	9	2.5	5	0	0	0	0	4	0	**1**	0	0
2011	CIN	**16**	5	42	27	15	6.0	6	**1**	0	0	0	5	1	**1**	0	0
2012	CIN	**16**	15	52	**35**	17	**11.5**	**15**	**1**	3	0	3	2	0	**1**	0	0
2013	CIN	15	15	**56**	**35**	**21**	3.5	5	**1**	7	0	7	**9**	2	0	0	0
2014	TAM	14	13	27	20	7	4.0	5	0	0	0	0	0	2	0	0	0
2015	CIN	**16**	15	42	29	13	5.0	6	0	0	0	0	2	**3**	**1**	0	0
2016	CIN	**16**	**16**	45	32	13	3.5	6	0	0	0	0	3	0	0	0	0
2017	CIN	15	15	49	**35**	14	5.0	11	0	0	0	0	1	0	0	0	0
2018	CIN	15	15	33	18	15	0.5	2	**1**	**22**	**1**	**22**	2	0	0	0	0
Career		155	119	398	268	130	44.5	65	4	32	1	22	33	8	4	0	0

=== Playoffs ===
Year	Team	Games		Tackles					Interceptions					Fumbles			
Year	Team	GP	GS	Cmb	Solo	Ast	Sck	TFL	Int	Yds	TD	Lng	PD	FF	FR	Yds	TD
2009	CIN	**1**	0	1	0	**1**	0.0	0	0	0	0	0	0	0	0	0	0
2011	CIN	**1**	0	0	0	0	0.0	0	0	0	0	0	0	0	0	0	0
2012	CIN	**1**	**1**	2	1	**1**	0.0	0	0	0	0	0	0	0	0	0	0
2013	CIN	**1**	**1**	1	1	0	0.0	0	0	0	0	0	0	0	0	0	0
2015	CIN	**1**	**1**	**5**	**4**	**1**	0.0	**1**	0	0	0	0	0	0	0	0	0
Career		5	3	9	6	3	0.0	1	0	0	0	0	0	0	0	0	0
