= Selmont-West Selmont, Alabama =

- Census-designated place
- Nickname: The Gateway to Selma
- Location within the state of Alabama
- Coordinates: 32°22′20″N 87°00′23″W
- Country: United States
- State: Alabama
- County: Dallas

Area
  - Total: 3.32 sq mi (8.59 km^{2})
  - Land: 3.28 sq mi (8.49 km^{2})
  - Water: 0.039 sq mi (0.10 km^{2})
- Elevation: 115 ft (35 m)

Population (2020)
  - Total: 2,158
  - Density: 658.2/sq mi (254.15/km^{2})
- Time zone: UTC-6 (Central (CST))
  - Summer (DST): UTC-5 (CDT)
- FIPS code: 01-69180
- GNIS feature ID: 2402837

Selmont-West Selmont is a census-designated place (CDP) in Dallas County, Alabama, United States. At the 2020 census, the population was 2,158.

== Geography ==
Selmont-West Selmont is located in eastern Dallas County. It is on the south side of the Alabama River, which separates it from the city of the Selma, the county seat, to the north. The Edmund Pettus Bridge carries U.S. Route 80 across the river into Selma at the north end of the CDP.

According to the U.S. Census Bureau, the CDP has a total area of 3.3 square miles (8.6 km^{2}), of which 3.3 square miles (8.5 km^{2}) is land and 0.04 square miles (0.1 km^{2}), or 1.17%, is water.

== Demographics ==
Historical population
Census	Pop.	Note	%±
1970	2,270		—
1980	5,255		131.5%
1990	3,823		−27.3%
2000	3,502		−8.4%
2010	2,671		−23.7%
2020	2,158		−19.2%
U.S. Decennial Census; 2013 Estimate

=== Racial and ethnic composition ===
Selmont-West Selmont CDP, Alabama – Racial and ethnic composition Note: the US Census treats Hispanic/Latino as an ethnic category. This table excludes Latinos from the racial categories and assigns them to a separate category. Hispanics/Latinos may be of any race.
Race / Ethnicity (NH = Non-Hispanic)	Pop 2000	Pop 2010	Pop 2020	% 2000	% 2010	% 2020
White alone (NH)	272	110	64	7.77%	4.12%	2.97%
Black or African American alone (NH)	3,176	2,505	2,040	90.69%	93.79%	94.53%
Native American or Alaska Native alone (NH)	5	3	1	0.14%	0.11%	0.05%
Asian alone (NH)	3	0	0	0.09%	0.00%	0.00%
Native Hawaiian or Pacific Islander alone (NH)	0	0	0	0.00%	0.00%	0.00%
Other race alone (NH)	1	1	0	0.03%	0.04%	0.00%
Mixed race or Multiracial (NH)	15	11	43	0.43%	0.41%	1.99%
Hispanic or Latino (any race)	30	41	10	0.86%	1.54%	0.46%
Total	3,502	2,671	2,158	100.00%	100.00%	100.00%

=== 2020 census ===
As of the 2020 census, Selmont-West Selmont had a population of 2,158. The median age was 42.5 years. 22.8% of residents were under the age of 18 and 18.0% of residents were 65 years of age or older. For every 100 females there were 84.6 males, and for every 100 females age 18 and over there were 82.2 males age 18 and over.

87.2% of residents lived in urban areas, while 12.8% lived in rural areas.

There were 880 households in Selmont-West Selmont, of which 29.5% had children under the age of 18 living in them. Of all households, 23.8% were married-couple households, 24.3% were households with a male householder and no spouse or partner present, and 45.9% were households with a female householder and no spouse or partner present. About 31.5% of all households were made up of individuals and 12.7% had someone living alone who was 65 years of age or older.

There were 1,031 housing units, of which 14.6% were vacant. The homeowner vacancy rate was 0.7% and the rental vacancy rate was 10.2%.

=== 2010 census ===
As of the census of 2010, there were 2,671 people, 999 households, and 658 families residing in the community. The population density was 810 inhabitants per square mile (310/km^{2}). There were 1,320 housing units at an average density of 400 per square mile (150/km^{2}). The racial makeup of the community was 93.9% Black or African American, 4.5% White, 0.1% Native American, 0.0% Asian, 0.0% from other races, and 0.4% from two or more races. 1.5% of the population were Hispanic or Latino of any race.

There were 999 households, out of which 27.4% had children under the age of 18 living with them, 22.1% were married couples living together, 36.9% had a female householder with no husband present, and 34.1% were non-families. 29.9% of all households were made up of individuals, and 9.9% had someone living alone who was 65 years of age or older. The average household size was 2.67 and the average family size was 3.36.

In the community the population was spread out, with 27.4% under the age of 18, 10.3% from 18 to 24, 23.4% from 25 to 44, 27.6% from 45 to 64, and 11.3% who were 65 years of age or older. The median age was 35.3 years. For every 100 females, there were 86.7 males. For every 100 females age 18 and over, there were 84.1 males.

The median income for a household in the community was $25,064, and the median income for a family was $26,741. Males had a median income of $21,536 versus $23,101 for females. The per capita income for the community was $9,798. About 36.1% of families and 34.0% of the population were below the poverty line, including 39.3% of those under age 18 and 36.9% of those age 65 or over.

=== 2000 census ===
As of the census of 2000, there were 3,502 people, 1,227 households, and 879 families residing in the community. The population density was 1,068.1 inhabitants per square mile (412.4/km^{2}). There were 1,574 housing units at an average density of 480.1 per square mile (185.4/km^{2}). The racial makeup of the community was 91.35% Black or African American, 7.91% White, 0.14% Native American, 0.09% Asian, 0.03% from other races, and 0.49% from two or more races. 0.86% of the population were Hispanic or Latino of any race.

There were 1,227 households, out of which 41.6% had children under the age of 18 living with them, 26.6% were married couples living together, 39.1% had a female householder with no husband present, and 28.3% were non-families. 25.6% of all households were made up of individuals, and 8.2% had someone living alone who was 65 years of age or older. The average household size was 2.85 and the average family size was 3.46.

In the community the population was spread out, with 36.3% under the age of 18, 10.7% from 18 to 24, 27.3% from 25 to 44, 16.7% from 45 to 64, and 9.1% who were 65 years of age or older. The median age was 27 years. For every 100 females, there were 80.4 males. For every 100 females age 18 and over, there were 73.2 males.

The median income for a household in the community was $11,591, and the median income for a family was $15,000. Males had a median income of $27,000 versus $17,786 for females. The per capita income for the community was $9,602. About 53.4% of families and 55.6% of the population were below the poverty line, including 64.8% of those under age 18 and 50.0% of those age 65 or over.
