= Valley Grande, Alabama =

City in Alabama, United States

Valley Grande
- City
- Location of Valley Grande in Dallas County, Alabama.
- Coordinates: 32°30′40″N 87°01′17″W
- Country: United States
- State: Alabama
- County: Dallas
- Incorporated: 2003

Government
  - Type: Mayor-council government
  - Mayor: John Hatfield

Area
  - Total: 33.82 sq mi (87.59 km^{2})
  - Land: 33.51 sq mi (86.78 km^{2})
  - Water: 0.31 sq mi (0.81 km^{2})
- Elevation: 259 ft (79 m)

Population (2020)
  - Total: 4,190
  - Density: 125.1/sq mi (48.29/km^{2})
- Time zone: UTC-6 (Central (CST))
  - Summer (DST): UTC-5 (CDT)
- ZIP codes: 36701, 36703
- Area code: 334
- FIPS code: 01-01047
- GNIS feature ID: 2405635
- Website: www.cityofvalleygrande.com

Valley Grande is a city in Dallas County, Alabama, United States, just north of Selma. Incorporated in early 2003, Valley Grande has a mayor-council form of government. As of the 2020 census, Valley Grande had a population of 4,190.

== History ==
Valley Grande encompasses the historic community of Summerfield. Established in 1819 as "Valley Creek", the town was renamed "Summerfield" in 1845 to honor the noted Methodist preacher John Summerfield. In 1829, the first academy in Dallas County was chartered in Valley Creek. In 1842, the Alabama Conference of the Methodist Church opened the Methodist Centenary Institute, a coeducational institution chartered by the Alabama Legislature on January 2, 1841. At its peak when cotton production was profitable, Summerfield was a very prosperous community of planters, doctors, merchants, ministers, and educators. The historical core of Summerfield has survived intact and is listed on the National Register of Historic Places as a historic district encompassing 56.12 acres (227,100 m^{2}).. On January 9, 2003, the people of Valley Grande voted 9 to 1 for incorporation as the Town of Valley Grande. After the election of a mayor and five-member town council the vast majority of the Summerfield area was voluntarily annexed as part of Valley Grande.

== Geography ==
Valley Grande is located in northeastern Dallas County at 32.486872, -87.032773. It is bordered to the south by the city of Selma, the county seat.

According to the United States Census Bureau, Valley Grande has a total area of 33.8 square miles (87.6 km^{2}), of which 33.5 square miles (86.8 km^{2}) is land and 0.31 square miles (0.8 km^{2}) is water.

== Demographics ==
Historical population
Census	Pop.	Note	%±
2010	4,020		—
2020	4,190		4.2%
U.S. Decennial Census

=== 2020 census ===
As of the 2020 census, Valley Grande had a population of 4,190. The median age was 44.3 years. 22.3% of residents were under the age of 18 and 19.8% of residents were 65 years of age or older. For every 100 females there were 95.2 males, and for every 100 females age 18 and over there were 91.3 males age 18 and over.

1.9% of residents lived in urban areas, while 98.1% lived in rural areas.

There were 1,666 households in Valley Grande, of which 31.5% had children under the age of 18 living in them. Of all households, 54.5% were married-couple households, 15.6% were households with a male householder and no spouse or partner present, and 25.3% were households with a female householder and no spouse or partner present. About 23.7% of all households were made up of individuals and 10.1% had someone living alone who was 65 years of age or older. There were 971 families residing in the city.

There were 1,788 housing units, of which 6.8% were vacant. The homeowner vacancy rate was 1.2% and the rental vacancy rate was 6.6%.

Racial composition as of the 2020 census
Race	Number	Percent
White	2,773	66.2%
Black or African American	1,272	30.4%
American Indian and Alaska Native	6	0.1%
Asian	24	0.6%
Native Hawaiian and Other Pacific Islander	1	0.0%
Some other race	30	0.7%
Two or more races	84	2.0%
Hispanic or Latino (of any race)	41	1.0%

=== 2010 census ===
As of the census of 2010, there were 4,020 people, 1,559 households, and 1,173 families residing in the city. The population density was 118.9 inhabitants per square mile (45.9/km^{2}). The racial makeup of the city was 75.2% White, 23% Black or African American, 0.4% Native American, 0.4% Asian, 0.2% from other races, and 0.8% from two or more races.

There were 1,559 households, out of which 33.4% had children under the age of 18 living with them; 34.2% were married couples living together, 10.6% had a female householder with no husband present, and 24.8% were non-families. 21.7% of all households were made up of individuals, and 10.9% had someone living alone who was 65 years of age or older. The average household size was 2.58 and the average family size was 3.00.

The median income for a household in the city was $57,432, and the median income for a family was $64,461. Males had a median income of $42,456 versus $37,722 for females. The per capita income for the city was $25,767. About 8.7% of families and 8.8% of the population were below the poverty line, including 15.1% of those under age 18 and 6.4% of those age 65 or over.

== Government ==
The city government is composed of a mayor and five at-large council members. The newly elected mayor is John Hatfield . The city council members are Ross Jones, Kay Davidson, Sarah Day, Tammy Troha and Jane Harris.

== Education ==
Residents are zoned to schools in Dallas County Schools. Valley Grande Elementary School and Martin Middle School, within the city, serve the county. Most high school-aged students attend the public Dallas County High School, located in Plantersville, a nearby unincorporated area.
