= Doctor's Office (Plantersville, Alabama) =

- U.S. National Register of Historic Places
- Location within Alabama Location within the United States
- Location: Jct. of First Ave. N of Oak St. and First Ave., Plantersville, Alabama
- Coordinates: 32°39′26″N 86°55′24″W
- Area: less than one acre
- Built: 1850
- Architectural style: Greek Revival
- MPS: Plantersville MRA
- NRHP reference No.: 86003663
- Added to NRHP: January 29, 1987

The Doctor's Office was a historic professional office building in Plantersville, Alabama, United States. The one-story, wood-frame structure was built in a vernacular interpretation of Greek Revival architecture c. 1850. The narrow main facade was three bays wide, with a pedimented one-story porch spanning the entire width. An entrance was situated in the middle bay, with a window to either side. The interior contained a single room. It was added to the National Register of Historic Places on January 29, 1987, as a part of the Plantersville Multiple Resource Area.
