= Antique Store (Plantersville, Alabama) =

- U.S. National Register of Historic Places
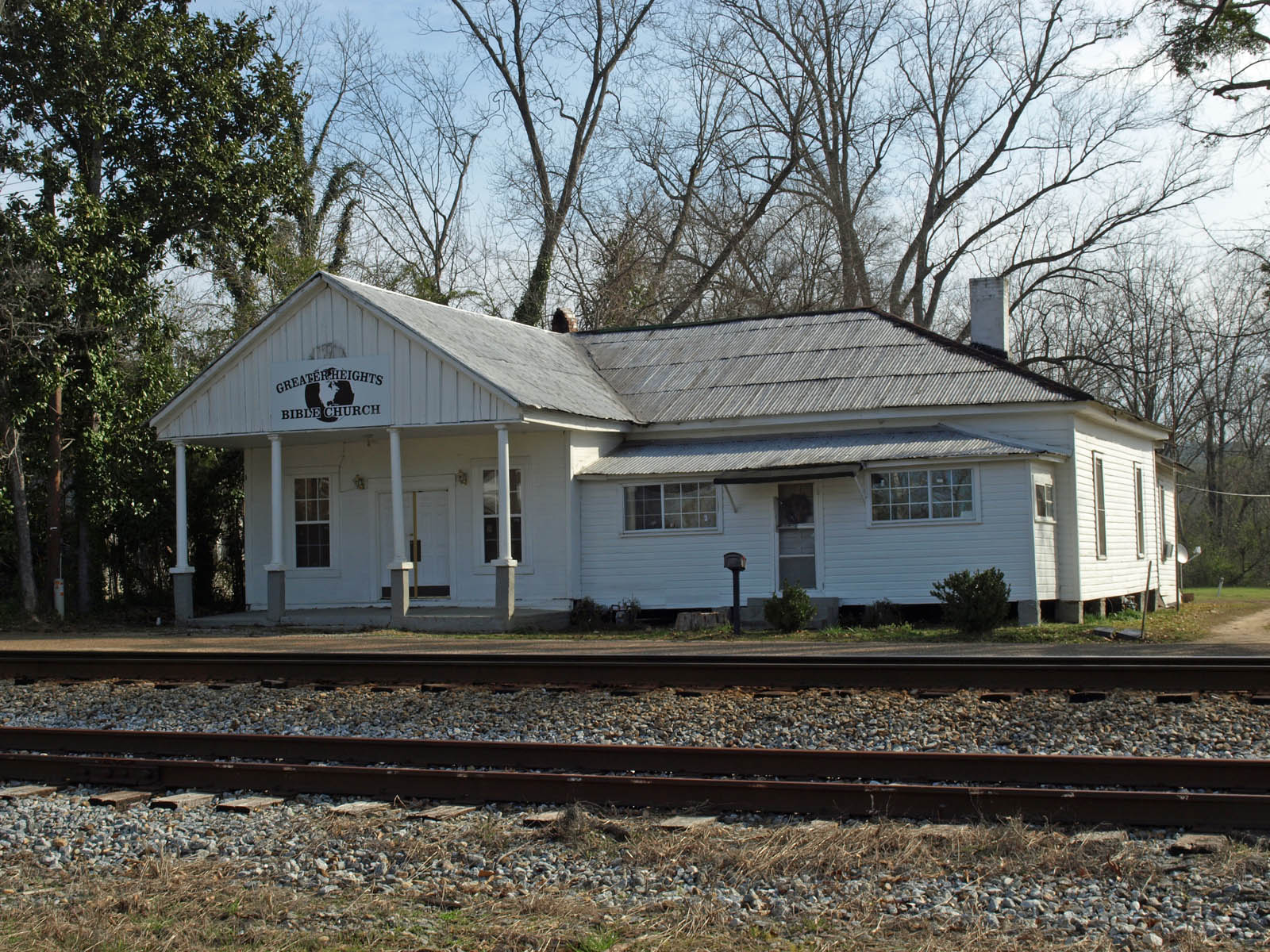

- Location within Alabama Location within the United States
- Location: Off AL 22, Plantersville, Alabama
- Coordinates: 32°39′31″N 86°55′22″W
- Area: less than one acre
- Built: 1870
- MPS: Plantersville MRA
- NRHP reference No.: 86003662
- Added to NRHP: January 29, 1987

The Antique Store is a historic commercial building in Plantersville, Alabama, United States. It is the oldest surviving commercial building in the community. The one-story, wood-frame structure was built in 1870. The main facade is three bays wide, with a pedimented one-story porch spanning the entire width. A side ell, added after the initial construction, projects from the south side of the main block. It was added to the National Register of Historic Places on January 29, 1987, as a part of the Plantersville Multiple Resource Area.
