= Todd House (Plantersville, Alabama) =

Historic house in Alabama, United States

- U.S. National Register of Historic Places
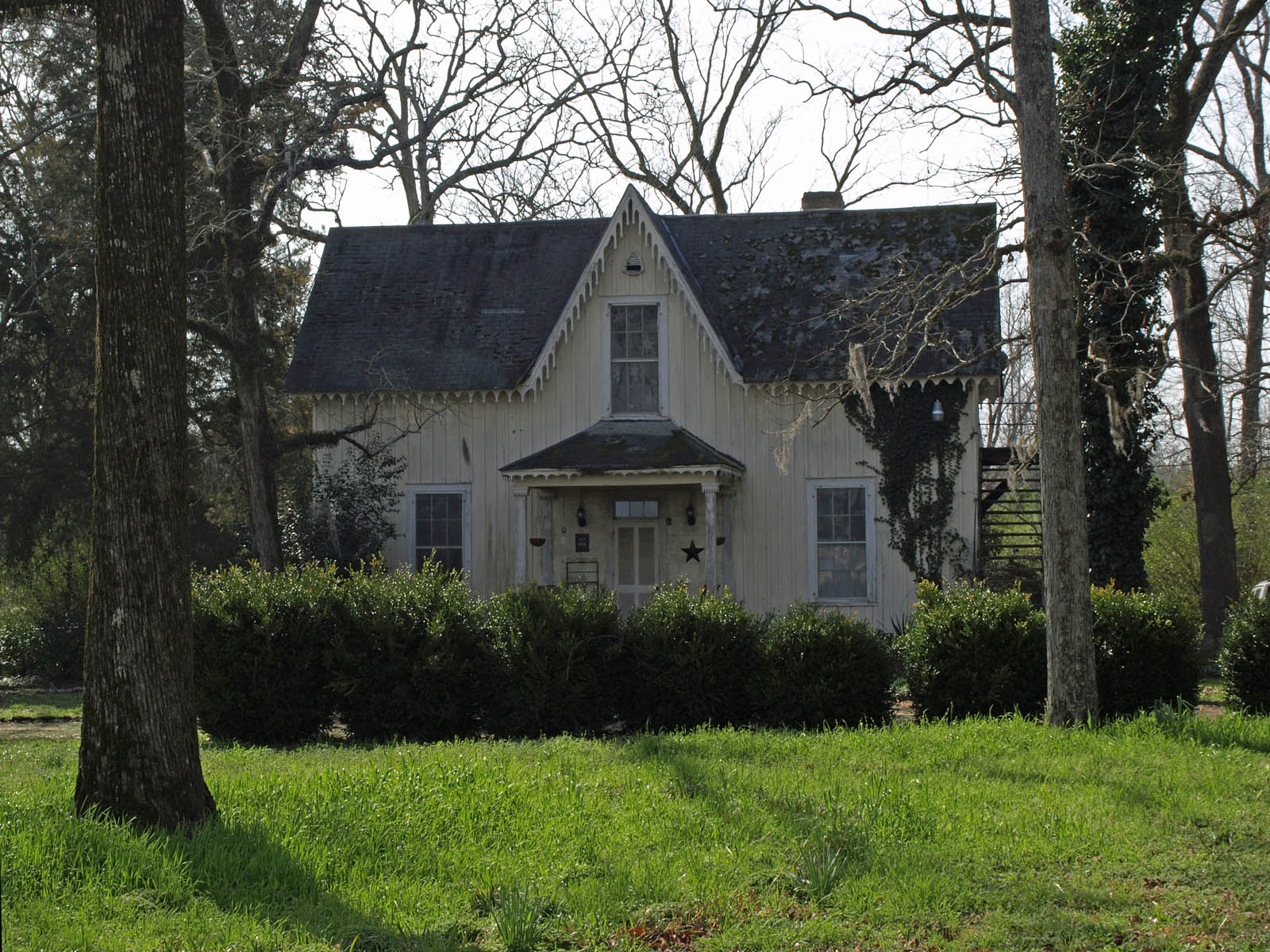

- Location within Alabama Location within the United States
- Location: S side of Oak St. W of First Ave., Plantersville, Alabama
- Coordinates: 32°39′21″N 86°55′52″W
- Area: less than one acre
- Built: 1868
- Architectural style: Carpenter Gothic
- MPS: Plantersville MRA
- NRHP reference No.: 86003665
- Added to NRHP: January 29, 1987

The Todd House, also known as the Todd-Biscoe House, is a historic house in Plantersville, Alabama, United States. The 1 1/2-story Carpenter Gothic cottage was built from 1867 to 1868 for Dr. Samuel G. Todd, the first dentist in Plantersville. Carpenter Gothic houses are relatively rare in Alabama. Architectural historians consider this example to be a good representation of the house designs advocated by Richard Upjohn and Alexander Jackson Davis.

The Todd family sold the property in 1916 to Salliegeo D. Lawrence. Henry E. Biscoe purchased it from the Lawrence family in 1959. It was added to National Register of Historic Places on January 29, 1987, as a part of the Plantersville Multiple Resource Area.
