= Old Town Historic District (Selma, Alabama) =

Historic district in Alabama, United States

- U.S. National Register of Historic Places
- U.S. Historic district
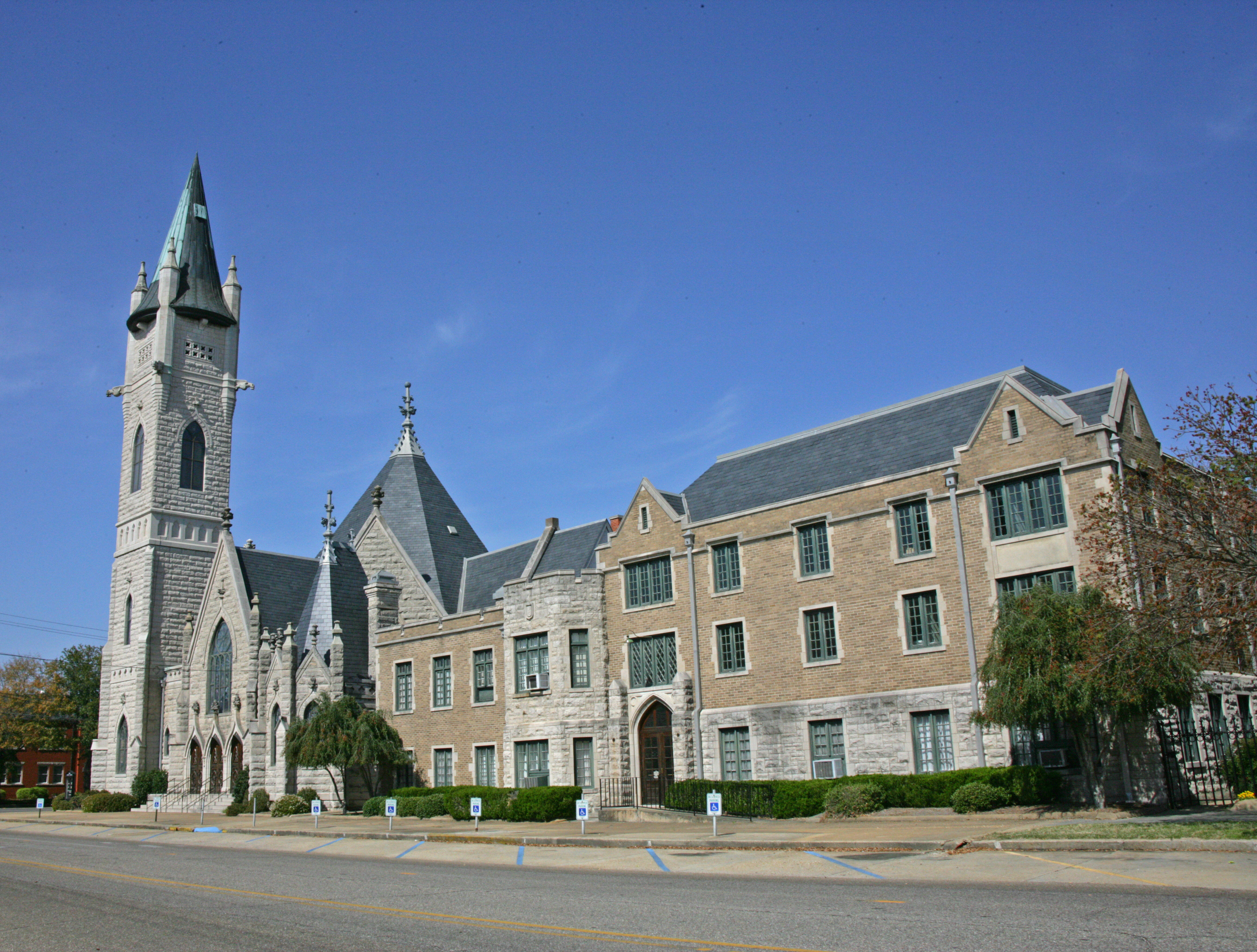
- The First Baptist Church, built in 1904

- Location within Alabama Location within the United States
- Location: Jefferson Davis Ave.; area roughly bounded by Broad, Dallas, US 80 and Franklin; Selma Ave.; and Franklin St., Selma, Alabama
- Coordinates: 32°24′37″N 87°01′31″W
- Area: 323 acres (131 ha)
- NRHP reference No.: 78000486
- Added to NRHP: May 3, 1978

The Old Town Historic District is a 323-acre (131 ha) historic district in Selma, Alabama, United States. It is bounded by U.S. Route 80, Broad and Franklin streets, and Dallas and Selma avenues. The boundaries were increased on December 15, 2003. The district includes examples of the Federal, Greek Revival, Italianate, Gothic Revival, Victorian, Shotgun, Queen Anne, Romanesque Revival, Renaissance Revival, and Classical Revival.

== Contributing properties ==
It contains 629 properties, with 513 contributing and 116 noncontributing to the district. It was added to the National Register of Historic Places on May 3, 1978.

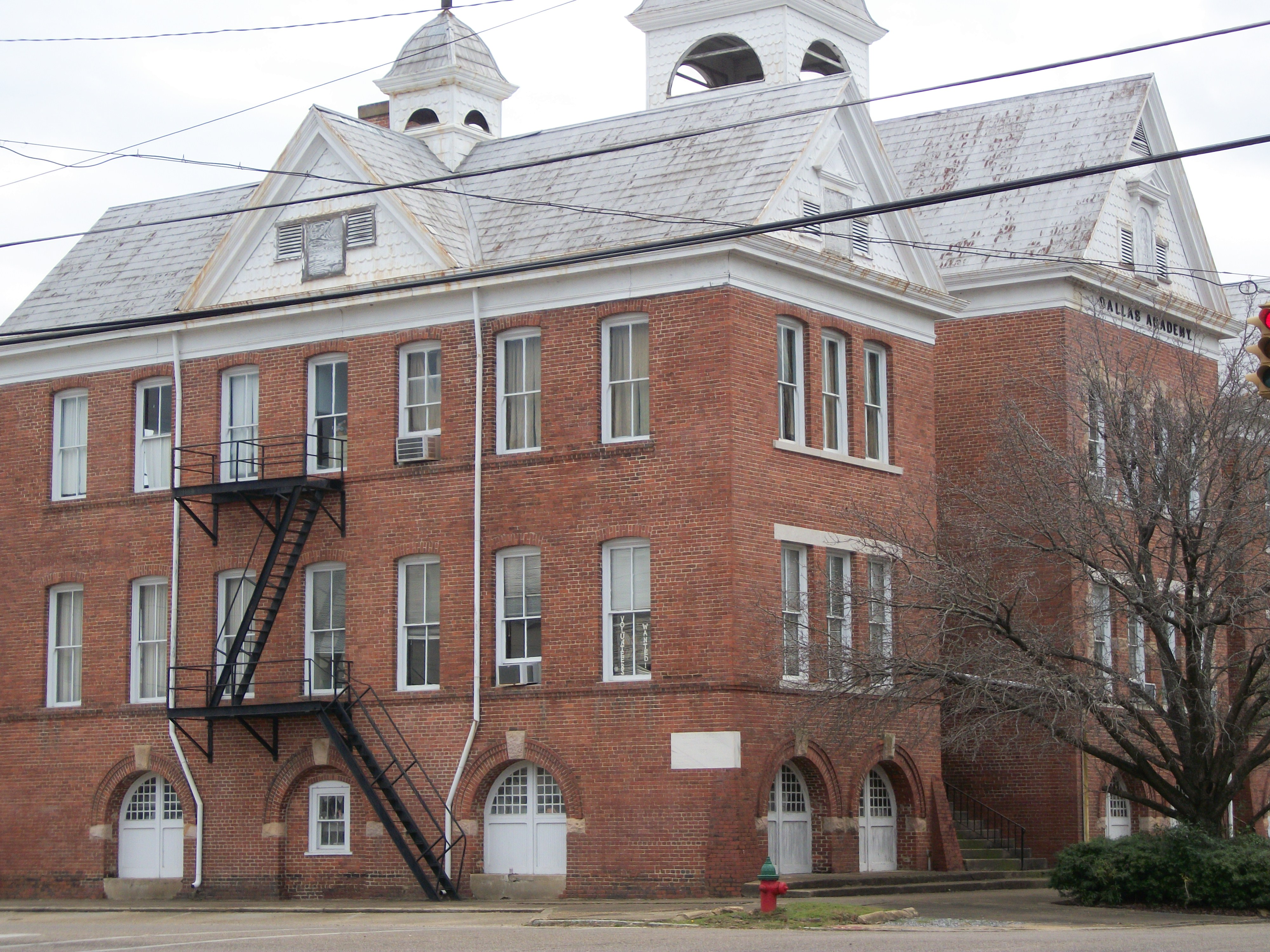
Dallas Academy building in 2012

- Dallas Academy was a private school in Selma, Alabama (Dallas County, Alabama). The school building was constructed ca. 1889 and it is a contributing property to the Old Town Historic District.
- Sturdivant Hall: Individually listed Greek Revival house.
