= Harrell, Alabama =

Unincorporated community in Alabama, United States

- Unincorporated community
- Location within Alabama Location within the United States
- Coordinates: 32°26′35″N 87°12′56″W
- Country: United States
- State: Alabama
- County: Dallas
- Elevation: 223 ft (68 m)
- Time zone: UTC-6 (Central (CST))
  - Summer (DST): UTC-5 (CDT)
- Area code: 334
- GNIS feature ID: 119779

Harrell is an unincorporated community in Dallas County, Alabama, United States.
