= Christian Church and Parsonage =

Historic church in Alabama, United States

- U.S. National Register of Historic Places
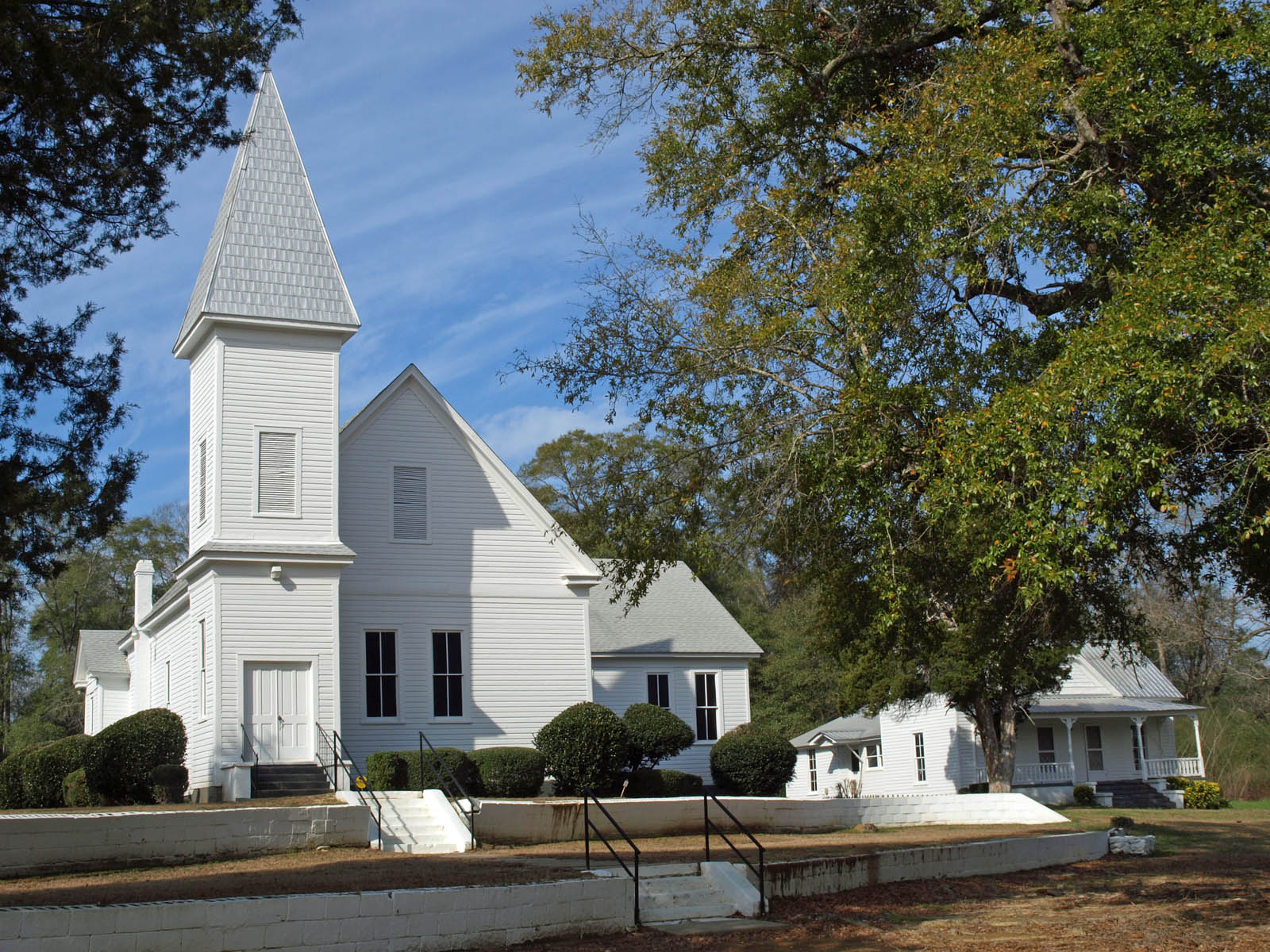

- Location within Alabama Location within the United States
- Location: Off AL 22, Plantersville, Alabama
- Coordinates: 32°39′24″N 86°55′29″W
- Area: 1.7 acres (0.69 ha)
- Built: 1898
- MPS: Plantersville MRA
- NRHP reference No.: 86003664
- Added to NRHP: January 29, 1987

Christian Church and Parsonage is a historic church and parsonage in Plantersville, Alabama, United States. Both the church and the parsonage were built in 1898. The pair were added to the National Register of Historic Places in 1987.
