= Skyharbor Airport =

Privately owned, public-use airport in Dallas County, Alabama

- IATA: none; ICAO: none; FAA LID: S63

Summary
- Airport type: Public
- Owner: Jacob L. Jewell
- Serves: Selma, Alabama
- Elevation AMSL: 125 ft / 38 m
- Coordinates: 32°22′00″N 087°06′15″W
- Interactive map of Skyharbor Airport

Runways
Direction	Length		Surface
Direction	ft	m	Surface
6/24	2,500	762	Turf
- Source: Federal Aviation Administration

Skyharbor Airport (FAA LID: S63) was a privately owned, public-use airport in Dallas County, Alabama, United States. It was located five nautical miles (5.8 mi, 9.3 km) southwest of the central business district of Selma, Alabama. Since 2011, official FAA records state "Airport closed indefinitely."

== Facilities and aircraft ==
Skyharbor Airport covers an area of 70 acres (28 ha) at an elevation of 125 feet (38 m) above mean sea level. It has one runway designated 6/24 with a turf surface measuring 2,500 by 170 feet (762 x 52 m).

For the 12-month period ending September 19, 1996, the airport had an average of 129 general aviation aircraft operations per week. At that time there were 14 aircraft based at this airport: 93% single-engine and 7% multi-engine.
