= Driskell–Martin House =

Historic house in Alabama, United States

- U.S. National Register of Historic Places
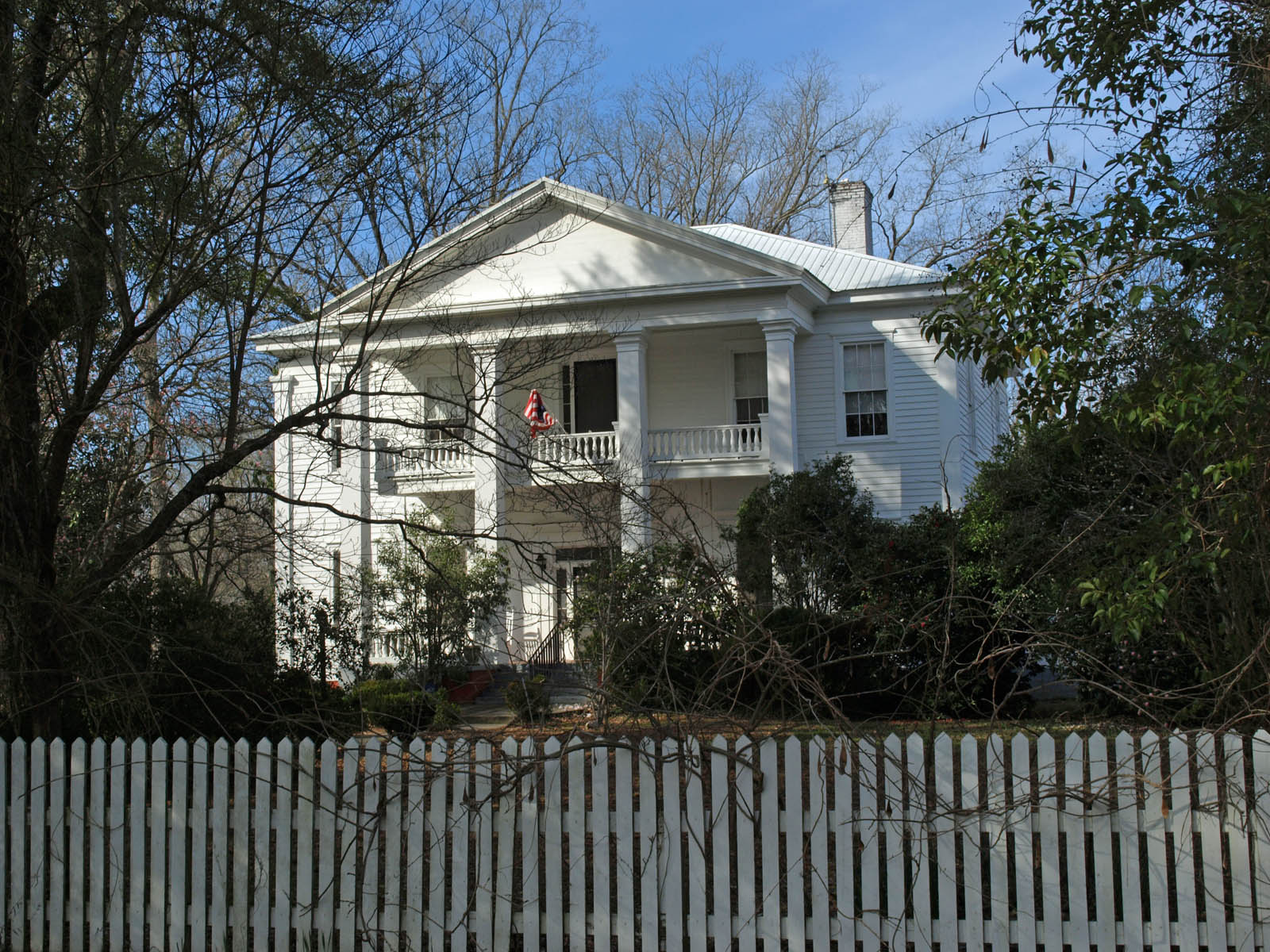

- Location within Alabama Location within the United States
- Location: NW jct. of Cherry St. and First Ave., Plantersville, Alabama
- Coordinates: 32°39′36″N 86°55′26″W
- Area: less than one acre
- Built: 1850
- Built by: Michell, Nelson; Godwin, Massena
- Architectural style: Greek Revival
- MPS: Plantersville MRA
- NRHP reference No.: 86003661
- Added to NRHP: January 29, 1987

The Driskell–Martin House is a historic house in Plantersville, Alabama, United States. It is the oldest surviving high style residence in the community. The two-story wood-frame house was built for Thomas Sanford Driskell, a planter and a merchant from Virginia, in 1850. The builders were Nelson Mitchell and Massena Godwin. The house was used as a Union headquarters during the American Civil War. Their forces occupied it during Wilson's Raid through Alabama in April 1865. The house remained in the Driskell family until purchased by Dr. Thomas Munroe Martin in 1915.

The Greek Revival-style structure is five bays wide, with a two-story pedimented portico spanning the three center bays. It was added to the National Register of Historic Places on January 29, 1987, as a part of the Plantersville Multiple Resource Area.
