= Carlowville, Alabama =

Unincorporated community in Alabama, United States

- Unincorporated community
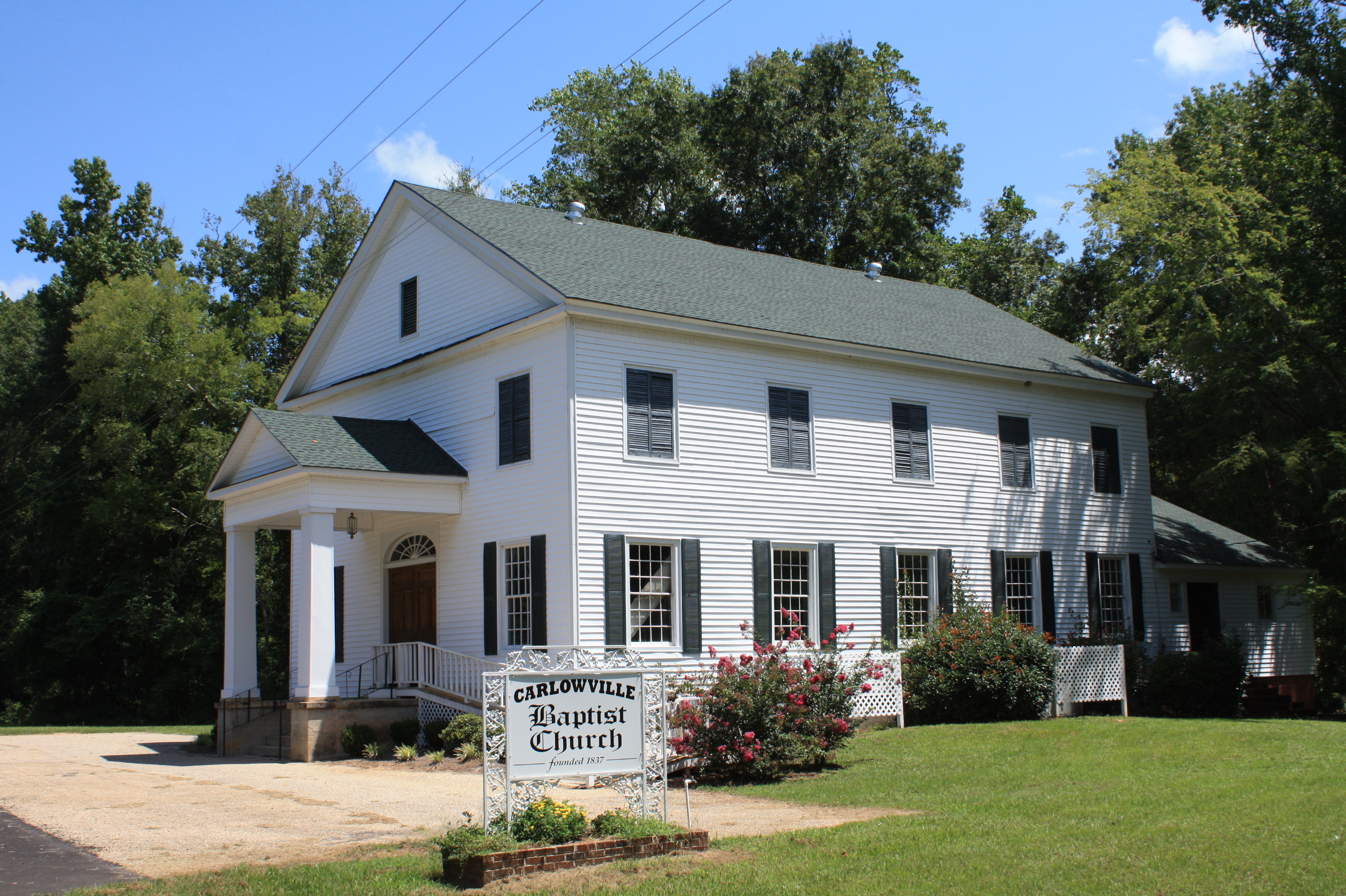
- The Carlowville Baptist Church, established in 1837 and added to the National Register of Historic Places on January 18, 1978 as a contributing property to the Carlowville Historic District.

- Location in Alabama Carlowville (the United States)
- Coordinates: 32°05′14″N 87°02′03″W
- Country: United States
- State: Alabama
- County: Dallas
- Elevation: 361 ft (110 m)
- Time zone: UTC-6 (Central (CST))
  - Summer (DST): UTC-5 (CDT)
- ZIP code: 36761
- Area code: 251
- GNIS feature ID: 115624

Carlowville is an unincorporated community in Dallas County, Alabama, United States. A portion of Carlowville was designated as the Carlowville Historic District on the National Register of Historic Places on January 18, 1978, the Carlowville Historic District.

== Demographics ==
Historical population
Census	Pop.	Note	%±
1880	154		—
U.S. Decennial Census

Carlowville was listed on the 1880 U.S. Census as an unincorporated community with a population of 154. It has not been listed on the census since, though the census division of Dallas County it is located within still bears that name to date.
