= Carlowville Historic District =

Historic district in Alabama, United States

- U.S. National Register of Historic Places
- U.S. Historic district
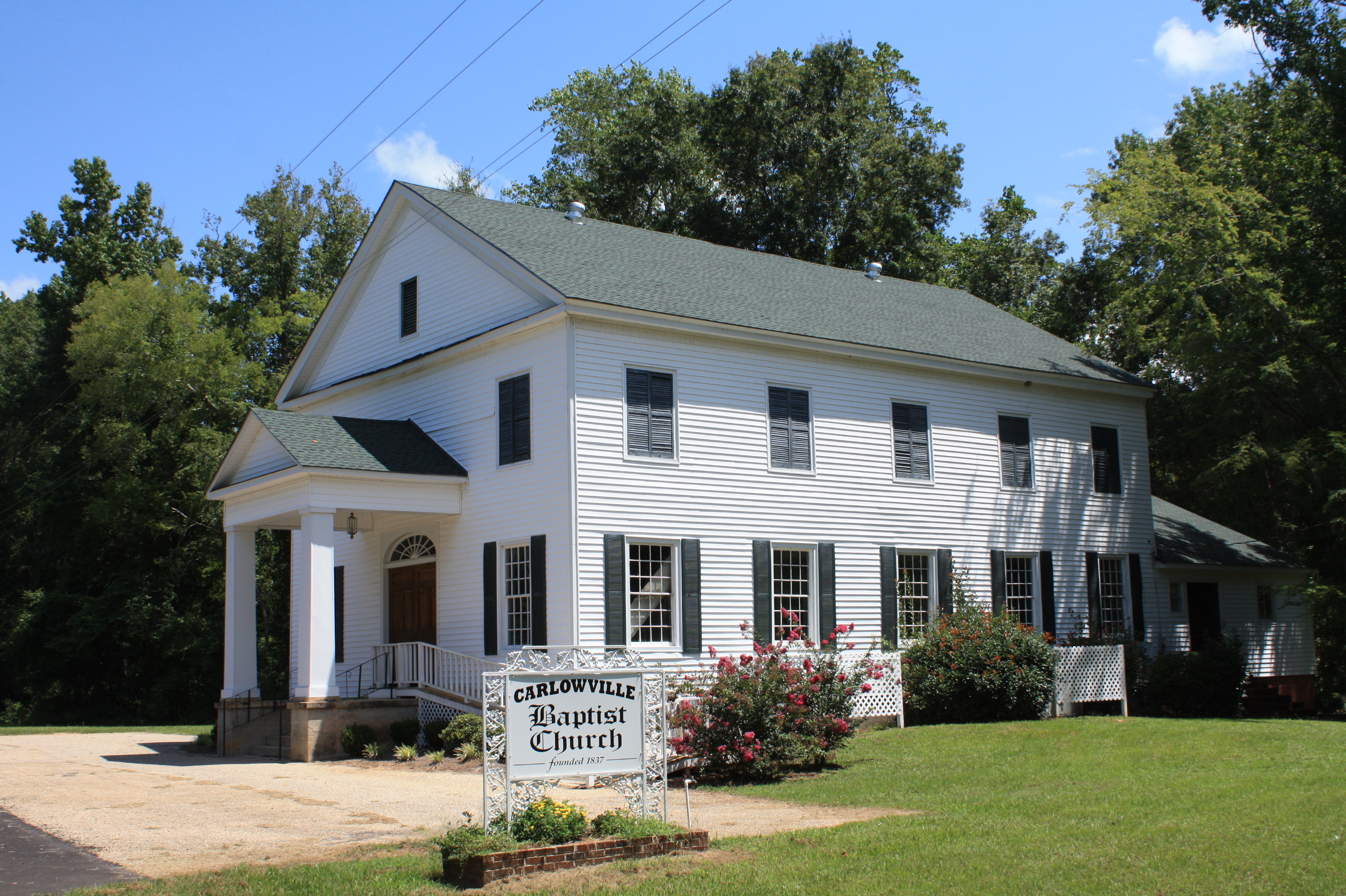
- Carlowville Baptist Church (circa 1837)

- Location within Alabama Location within the United States
- Interactive map showing the location of Carlowville Historic District
- Nearest city: Carlowville, Alabama
- Coordinates: 32°5′21″N 87°1′45″W
- Area: 780 acres (320 ha)
- Architect: Multiple
- Architectural style: Federal, Greek Revival, late 19th And 20th century revival styles
- NRHP reference No.: 78000487
- Added to NRHP: January 18, 1978

The Carlowville Historic District is a historic district in the community of Carlowville, Alabama, United States. It covers 780 acres (320 ha) and is centered on Alabama State Route 89 and Dallas County roads 4, 47 and 417. It was placed on the National Register of Historic Places on January 18, 1978.

== Description ==
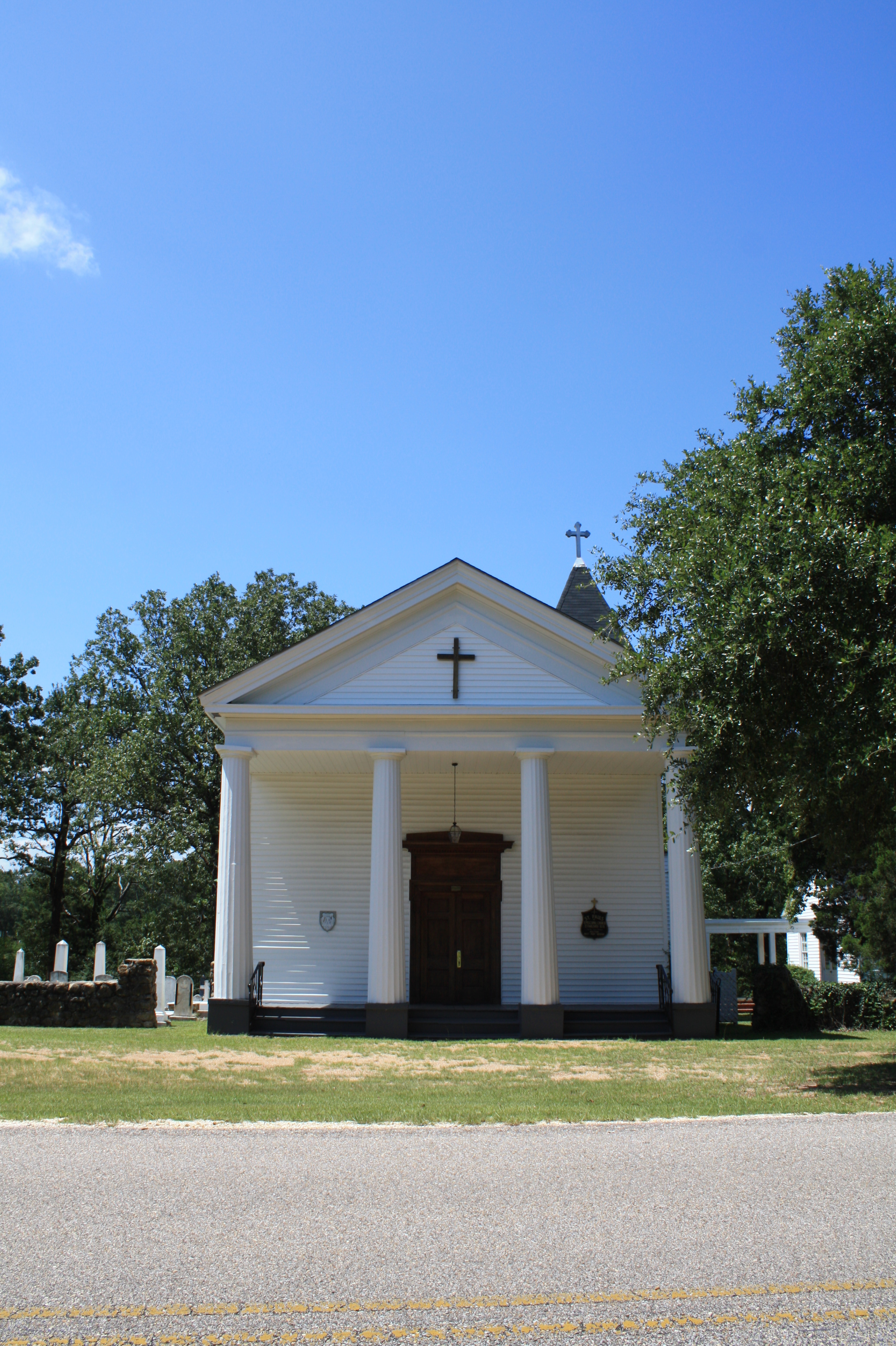
St. Paul's Episcopal Church (1838)

The Carlowville Historic District was nominated to the National Register as a "pleasant blending of nineteenth and twentieth century architecture in quiet, rural environment." The earlier buildings are predominantly wood-frame structures. They range from elegant mansions to plain folk houses. Some of the homes continue to be owned by descendants of the original builders who came here from the Atlantic seaboard nearly 200 years ago.

Several of the more substantial houses were built atop brick basements. Two of these structures had their original brick ground floor removed and were subsequently lowered during the twentieth century. Architectural historians have attributed this to dampness and the poor quality of the local brick.

== Contributing structures ==
At the time of the nomination, the Carlowville Historic District contained 21 contributing properties, built primarily in the Colonial Georgian, Federal, and Greek Revival styles. Greek Revival is the dominant style. The contributing buildings recognized by architectural historians as the most important structures to the district include: the Rumpt-Alison House (built circa 1840), a two-story Greek Revival-style house with a two-tiered portico; the Alison-Wade House (1849), a two-story Colonial Georgian-style house with a small one-story porch; St. Paul's Episcopal Church (1838), with a Greek Revival-style tetrastyle Doric portico and late nineteenth century Gothic Revival-style bell tower and windows; Carlowville Baptist Church (circa 1837), an end-gabled Federal-style building with a central entrance porch; the Lee-Wade House (1841), an end-gabled two-story Greek Revival-style house with a monumental portico that originally had a brick ground story; the Alison-Youngblood House (1833), remodeled in the Neoclassical style during the 1920s; the St. Paul's Episcopal Church Rectory (mid-nineteenth century), a one-story Greek Revival-style building that originally had a brick ground story; and the Calhoun Law Office (1840), a small Greek Revival-style professional building that was built by Judge James Martin Calhoun, a nephew of John C. Calhoun.
