= Sullivan and Richie Jean Jackson House =

- Formerly listed on the U.S. National Register of Historic Places
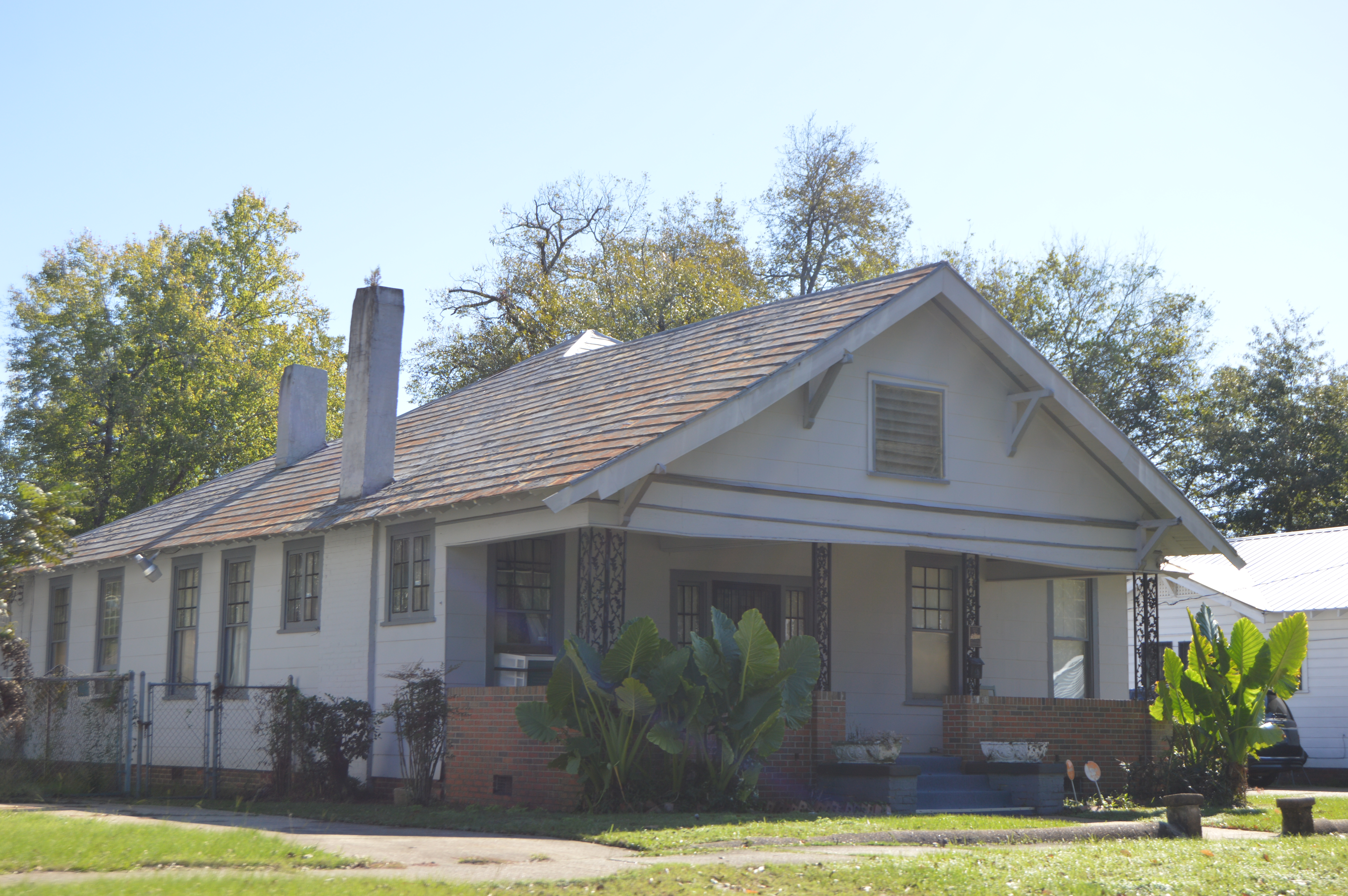
- Northern side and front

- Location within Alabama
- Location: 1416 Lapsley Ave., Selma, Alabama
- Coordinates: 32°25′9″N 87°1′52″W
- Built: 1906, c.1960
- MPS: Civil Rights Movement in Selma, Alabama, 1865-1972
- NRHP reference No.: 13001033

Significant dates
- Added to NRHP: January 18, 2014
- Removed from NRHP: January 3, 2025

The Sullivan and Richie Jean Jackson House, at 1416 Lapsley Ave. in Selma, Alabama, United States, was listed on the National Register of Historic Places in 2014. It was delisted in 2025. It is now located at Greenfield Village in Dearborn, Michigan.

It is a one-story wood frame bungalow which was built in 1906 and was remodeled around 1960. It has wide-board siding and a metal pyramid roof, and is built upon a brick and concrete foundation.

== History ==
The home belonged to Dr. Sullivan and Richie Jean Jackson during the Civil rights movement. The home is most famous for hosting Martin Luther King Jr. when he was in Selma, including during the planning and preparations for the Selma to Montgomery marches, as well as hosting Ralph Bunche during his visit to Selma. King frequently spoke on the phone with President Lyndon B. Johnson from the house.

The home was unlisted from the NRHP in January, 2025, following its move to Greenfield Village at the request of Dr. and Mrs. Jackson’s daughter, Jawana Jackson. There, it underwent extensive refurbishment. The home was restored to its 1965 state to reflect its role in the Civil Rights movement. The home now includes an addition featuring an exhibition highlighting the Civil Rights movement before patrons enter the home itself.
