= Riverview Historic District (Selma, Alabama) =

Historic district in Alabama, United States

- U.S. National Register of Historic Places
- U.S. Historic district
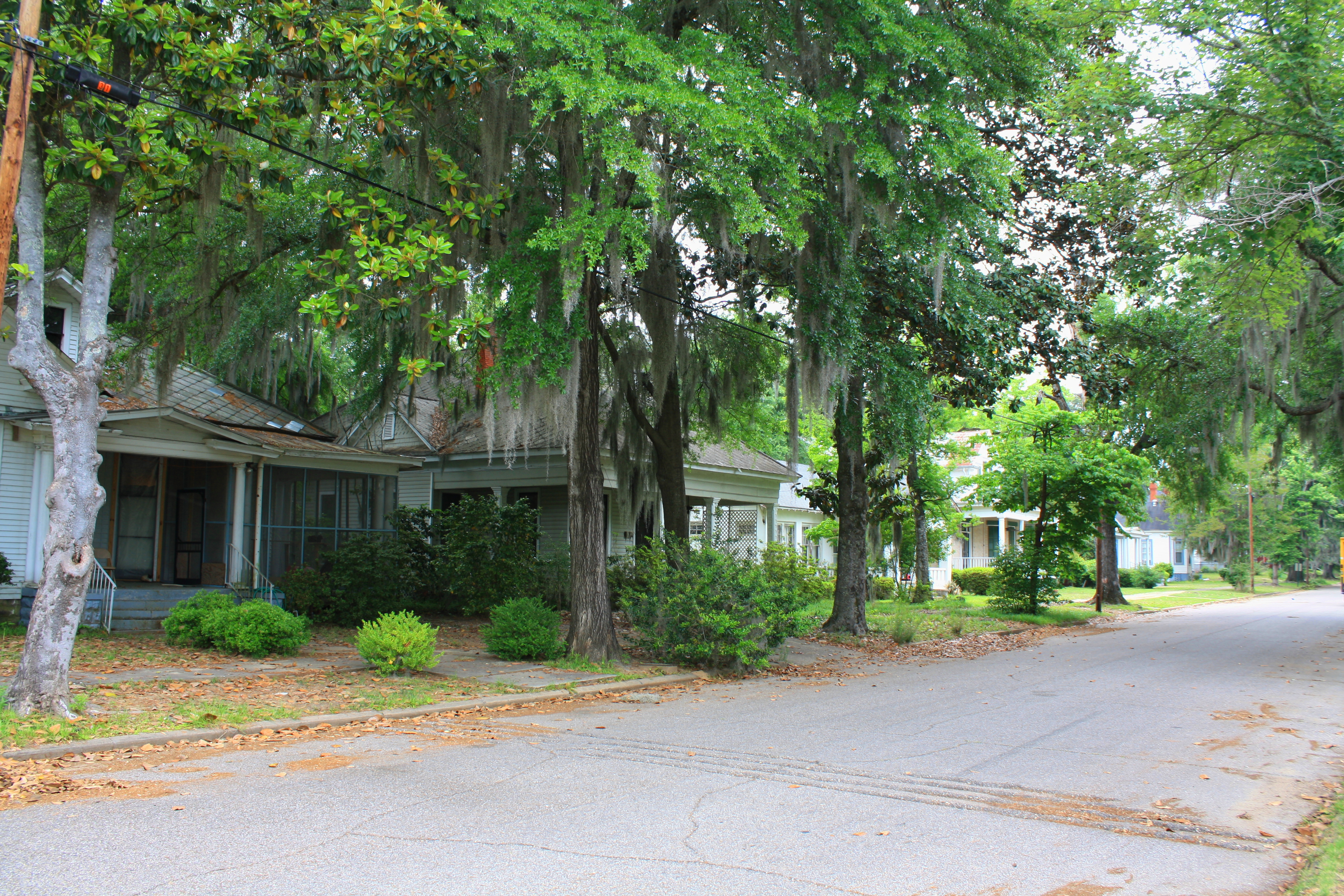
- View along Lamar Avenue in the district

- Location within Alabama Location within the United States
- Location: Roughly bounded by Selma Ave., Satterfield and Lapsley Sts. and the Alabama River, Selma, Alabama
- Coordinates: 32°24′11″N 87°01′50″W
- Area: 86 acres (35 ha)
- NRHP reference No.: 90000887
- Added to NRHP: June 28, 1990

The Riverview Historic District is an 86-acre (35 ha) historic district in Selma, Alabama, United States. It is bounded by Selma Avenue, Satterfield and Lapsley streets, and the Alabama River. The district includes examples of the Tudor Revival, Colonial Revival, American Craftsman, and several Queen Anne styles (Stick, Eastlake, and Shingle). Primarily residential, it contains 204 contributing properties and 54 noncontributing properties. The district is representative of the prosperity of people in the city at the turn of the 20th century. This time marked a period of major growth for the middle and working-class population. The district was added to the National Register of Historic Places on June 28, 1990.
