= Minter, Alabama =

Unincorporated community in Alabama, United States

- Unincorporated community
- Location in Alabama Minter (the United States)
- Coordinates: 32°04′41″N 86°59′37″W
- Country: United States
- State: Alabama
- County: Dallas
- Elevation: 177 ft (54 m)
- Time zone: UTC-6 (Central (CST))
  - Summer (DST): UTC-5 (CDT)
- ZIP code: 36761
- Area code: 251
- GNIS feature ID: 122882

Minter is an unincorporated community in Dallas County, Alabama, United States. Minter has one site included on the National Register of Historic Places, the Street Manual Training School.
