= Water Avenue Historic District =

Historic district in Alabama, United States

- U.S. National Register of Historic Places
- U.S. Historic district
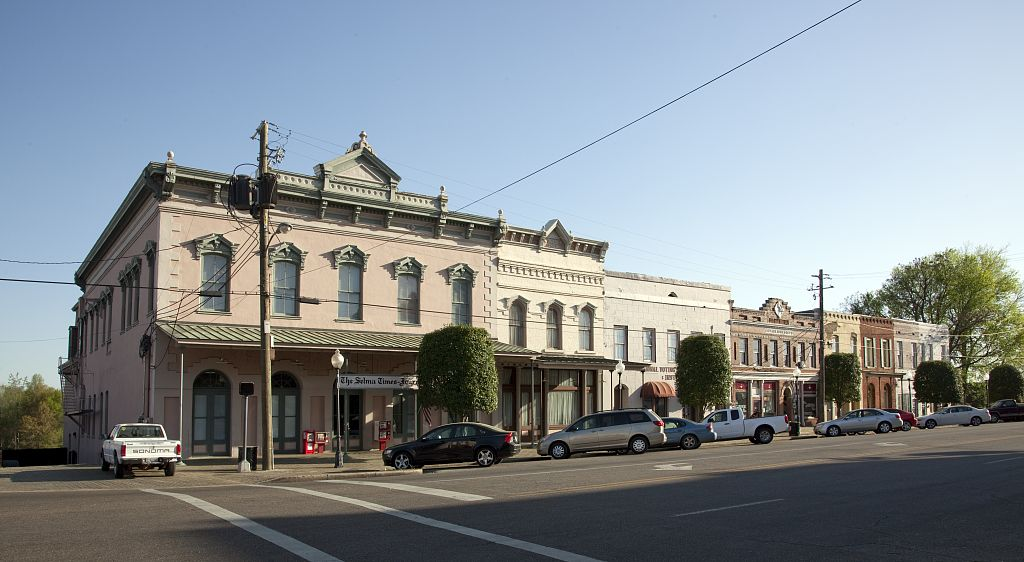

- Location within Alabama Location within the United States
- Location: Water Ave. bounded by Lauderdale, MLK Blvd., Beech Creek, Alabama R, Selma, Alabama
- Coordinates: 32°24′26″N 87°1′1″W
- Area: 10 acres (4.0 ha)
- NRHP reference No.: 72000160

Significant dates
- Added to NRHP: December 26, 1972
- Boundary increases: July 7, 2005; June 25, 2021

The Water Avenue Historic District is a 10-acre (4.0 ha) historic district in Selma, Alabama, United States. It is centered on Water Avenue in downtown. The boundaries were increased on July 7, 2005. The district is primarily commercial, with examples of the Greek Revival, Italianate, Queen Anne, Romanesque Revival, and Renaissance Revival styles. It contains 52 properties, with 47 contributing and five noncontributing to the district. It was added to the National Register of Historic Places on December 26, 1972, with boundary increases in 2005 and 2021.
