= Icehouse Historic District =

Historic district in Alabama, United States

- U.S. National Register of Historic Places
- U.S. Historic district
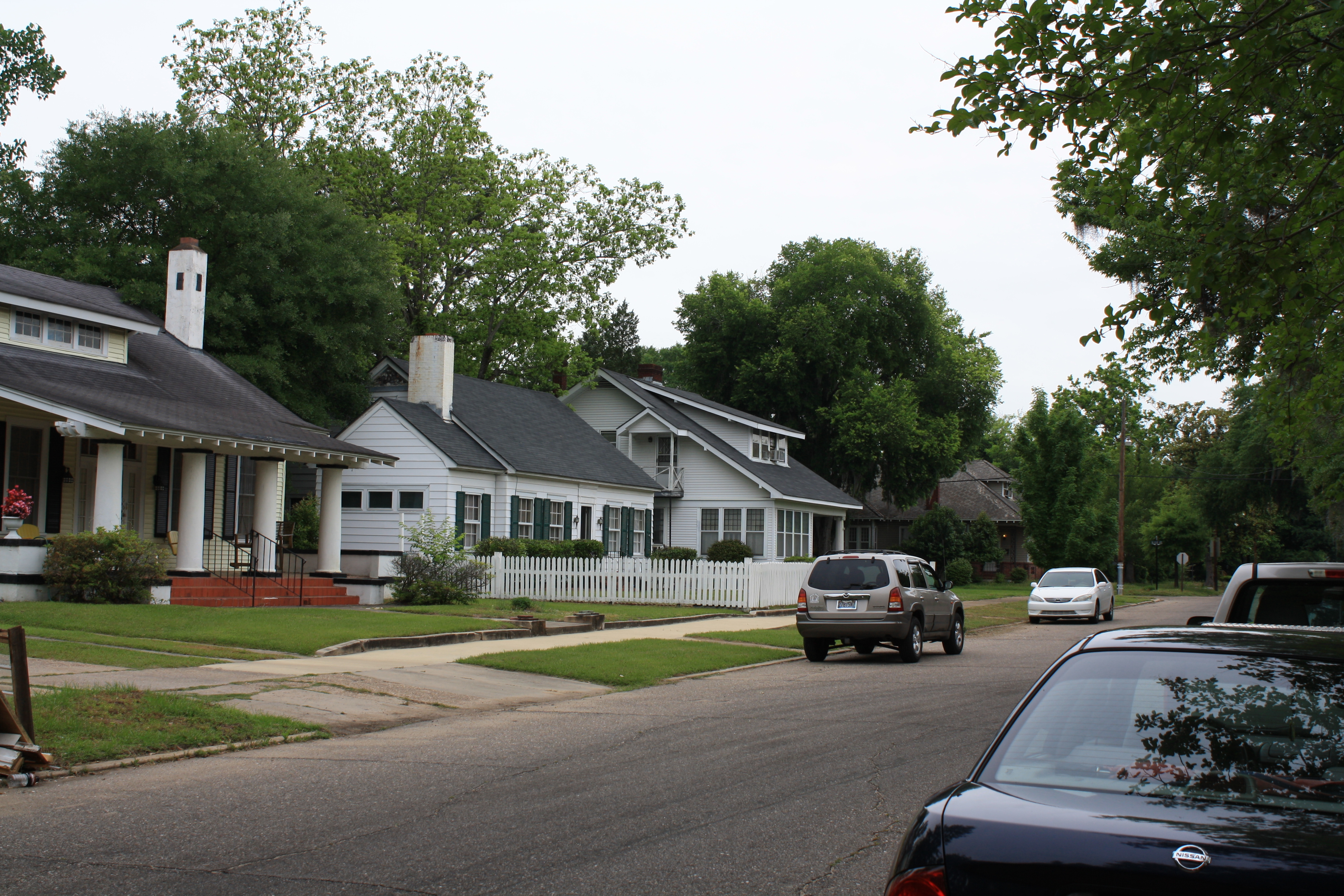
- View along King Street in the district

- Location within Alabama Location within the United States
- Location: Roughly bounded by Jeff Davis and Dallas Aves., Union and Lapsley Sts., and Valley Cr., Selma, Alabama
- Coordinates: 32°24′39″N 87°01′54″W
- Area: 116 acres (47 ha)
- NRHP reference No.: 90000886
- Added to NRHP: June 28, 1990

The Icehouse Historic District is a 116-acre (47 ha) historic district in Selma, Alabama, United States. It is bounded by J.L. Chestnut Jr. Boulevard (formerly Jeff Davis Avenue) on the north, the banks of Valley Creek on the west, Dallas Avenue on the south, and Union and Lapsley streets on the east. The district includes examples of the Tudor Revival, American Craftsman, Colonial Revival, and other early 20th century residential styles. It contains 213 contributing buildings and 141 noncontributing structures. The district is a neighborhood of small wood-frame and brick residences housing a mixture of low and middle-income families along tree-lined streets. It was added to the National Register of Historic Places on June 28, 1990.
