= J. Bruce Hain House =

Historic house in Alabama, United States

- The Hain-Harrelson House
- U.S. National Register of Historic Places
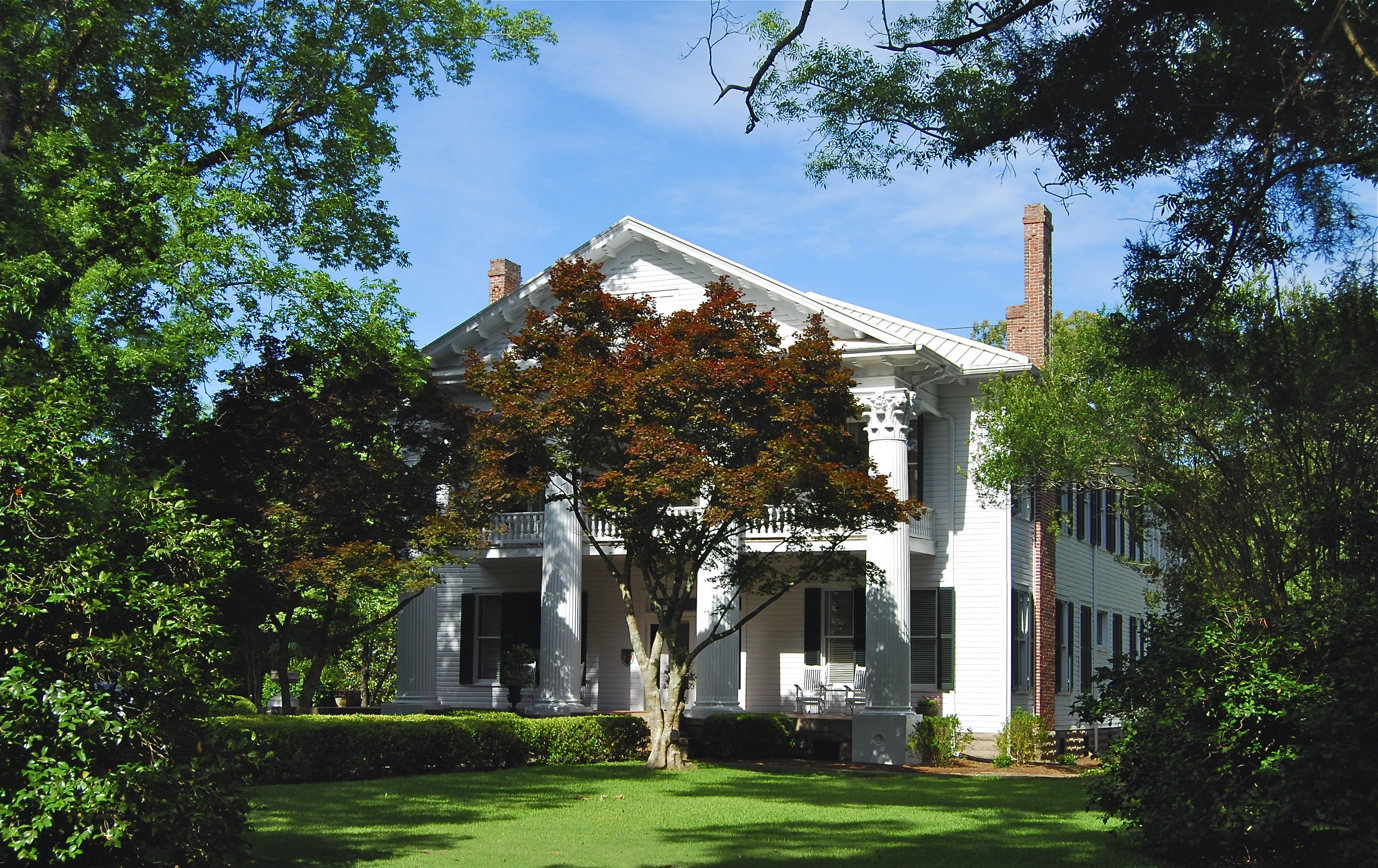

- Location within Alabama Location within the United States
- Location: 5826 AL 41, Sardis, Alabama
- Coordinates: 32°17′17″N 86°59′14″W
- Area: 1 acre (0.40 ha)
- Built: 1913
- Built by: W.D. Rutledge, Thomas Franklin Pearson
- Architectural style: Classical Revival
- NRHP reference No.: 01001295
- Added to NRHP: November 30, 2001

The Hain-Harrelson House is a historic house in Sardis, Alabama, United States. The Classical Revival style structure was completed in 1913 for J. Bruce Hain on his working plantation. The house contains roughly 8,000 square feet (740 m^{2}) spread over two floors. The interior is divided on a central hall plan. The front exterior is adorned with a monumental two-story Corinthian portico with a full-width second floor balcony. The house sat vacant for more than two decades until it was purchased by Cecil Gayle and Kenneth Parker of Atlanta in 1998. They stabilized and restored the home to its original condition. It was added to the National Register of Historic Places on November 30, 2001. The home was purchased in December 2015 by Ray and Angie Harrelson of Selma, AL.
