= Tabernacle Baptist Church (Selma, Alabama) =

- U.S. National Register of Historic Places
- Alabama Register of Landmarks and Heritage
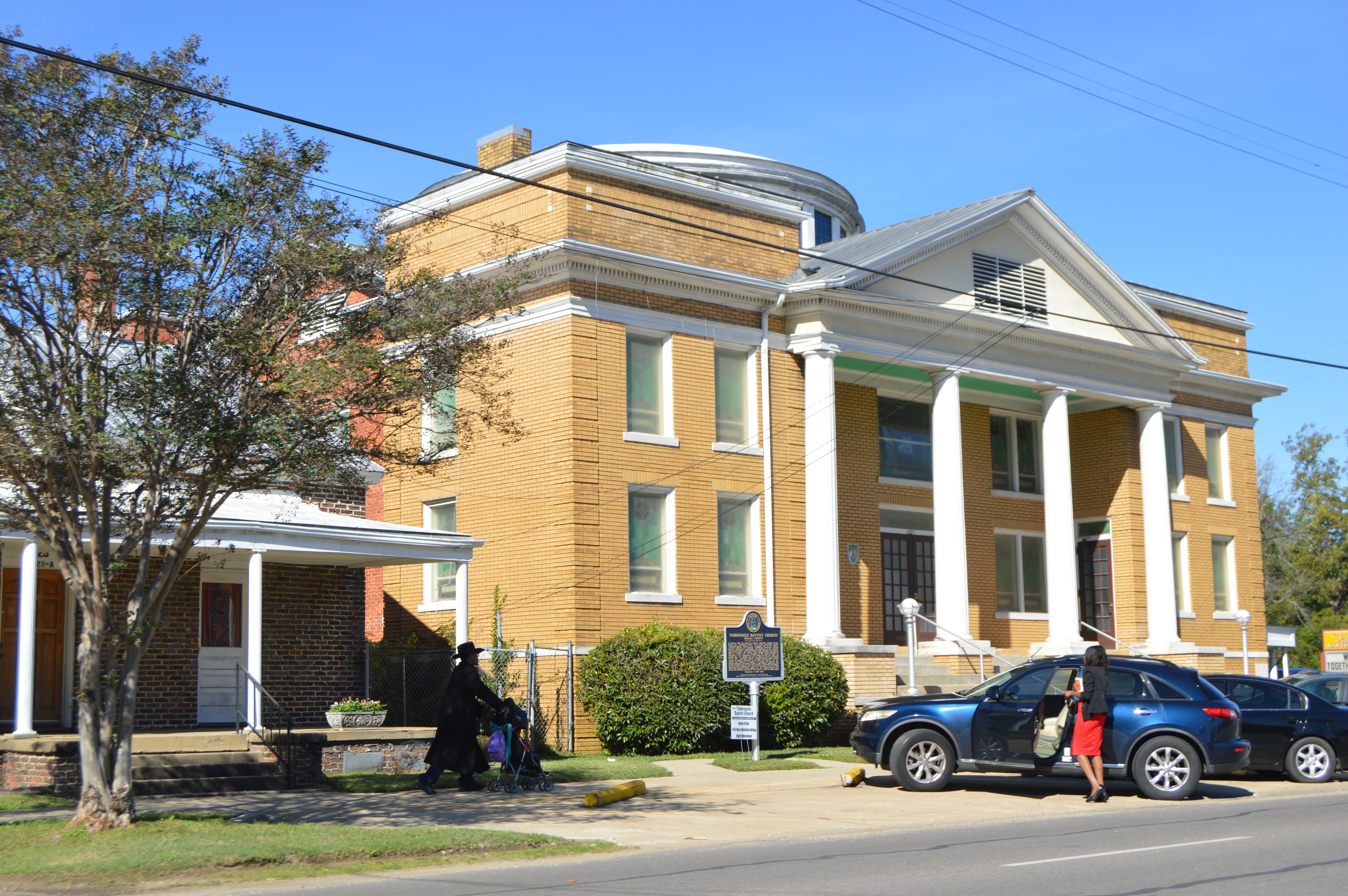
- Facade and southern side

- Location within Alabama
- Location: 1431 Broad St., Selma, Alabama
- Coordinates: 32°25′10″N 87°01′28″W
- Built: 1922
- Architect: David T. West
- Architectural style: Neoclassical
- MPS: Civil Rights Movement in Selma, Alabama, 1865-1972
- NRHP reference No.: 13000469

Significant dates
- Added to NRHP: July 10, 2013
- Designated ARLH: June 19, 1996

The Tabernacle Baptist Church, at 1431 Broad St. in Selma, Alabama, United States, was built in 1922. It was listed on the National Register of Historic Places in 2013. On May 14, 1963, it was the site of the first mass meeting of the voting rights movement. Organized by Student Non-Violent Coordinating Committee (SNCC) AL Voter Registration Campaign Chairman Bernard Lafayette and activist Amelia Boynton, the meeting hosted over 300 people in attendance. Selma Sheriff Jim Clark attended the meeting with other deputized men to attempt to scare or antagonize attendees.

It is a Baptist church in the National Baptist Convention, USA, and was designed by African American architect David T. West. The church became part of the African American Civil Rights Network in February 2021.
