= Dallas County High School =

Public high school in Plantersville, Alabama, United States

Location
- 335 5th Avenue; Plantersville, Alabama 36758; United States; 32°39′42″N 86°55′46″W

Information
- Type: Free public
- Established: 1903 (123 years ago)
- School district: Dallas County Board of Education
- CEEB code: 012200
- Principal: Erika Crum
- Faculty: 23.84 (on an FTE basis)
- Grades: 9-12
- Enrollment: 334 (2024-2025)
- Student to teacher ratio: 14.01
- Campus type: Rural
- Colors: Green and white
- Athletics: Baseball, basketball, cheerleading, football, softball, track, volleyball
- Athletics conference: AHSAA 3A
- Mascot: Hornet
- Rivals: Jemison High School, Southside Selma High School
- Website: dchs.dallask12.org

Dallas County High School is a public high school in Plantersville, Alabama, United States.

== Building history ==
In the late 19th century Plantersville had its own college, founded by and chartered under John L. Dodson LL.D., who had formerly been president of Oxford College at Oxford, Alabama. Dallas County High School of Plantersville finally came into existence in 1909 and absorbed the facilities of Plantersville College.

Dallas County High School was the oldest public high school building in existence until fire destroyed the main building on April 19, 1982. Arson was suspected and many of the community mourned the loss of the building and also old records, trophies and other memorabilia. The school building was reopened by the fall of 1983 and restored to its original antebellum style architecture. Along with the new main building, there are additions to the campus, with the 9th grade Success Academy and two gymnasiums, one being used for the basketball and the volleyball teams.

== Notable alumni ==
- Michael Johnson- Football, defensive end for the Cincinnati Bengals
