= Sardis, Alabama =

Unincorporated community in Alabama, United States

- Unincorporated community
- Location in Alabama Sardis (the United States)
- Coordinates: 32°17′16″N 86°59′09″W
- Country: United States
- State: Alabama
- County: Dallas
- Elevation: 246 ft (75 m)
- Time zone: UTC-6 (Central (CST))
  - Summer (DST): UTC-5 (CDT)
- ZIP code: 36775
- Area code: 334
- GNIS feature ID: 126399

Sardis, also known as Berlin, is an unincorporated community in Dallas County, Alabama, United States.

== History ==
A post office called Sardis was established in 1856. The community was named after the biblical city of Sardis.

Sardis has one site included on the National Register of Historic Places, the J. Bruce Hain House.

== Notable people ==
- Bill Hefner, U.S. Representative from 1975 to 1999
- Clara Weaver Parrish, artist
