= Dallas County, Alabama =

County in Alabama, United States

- County
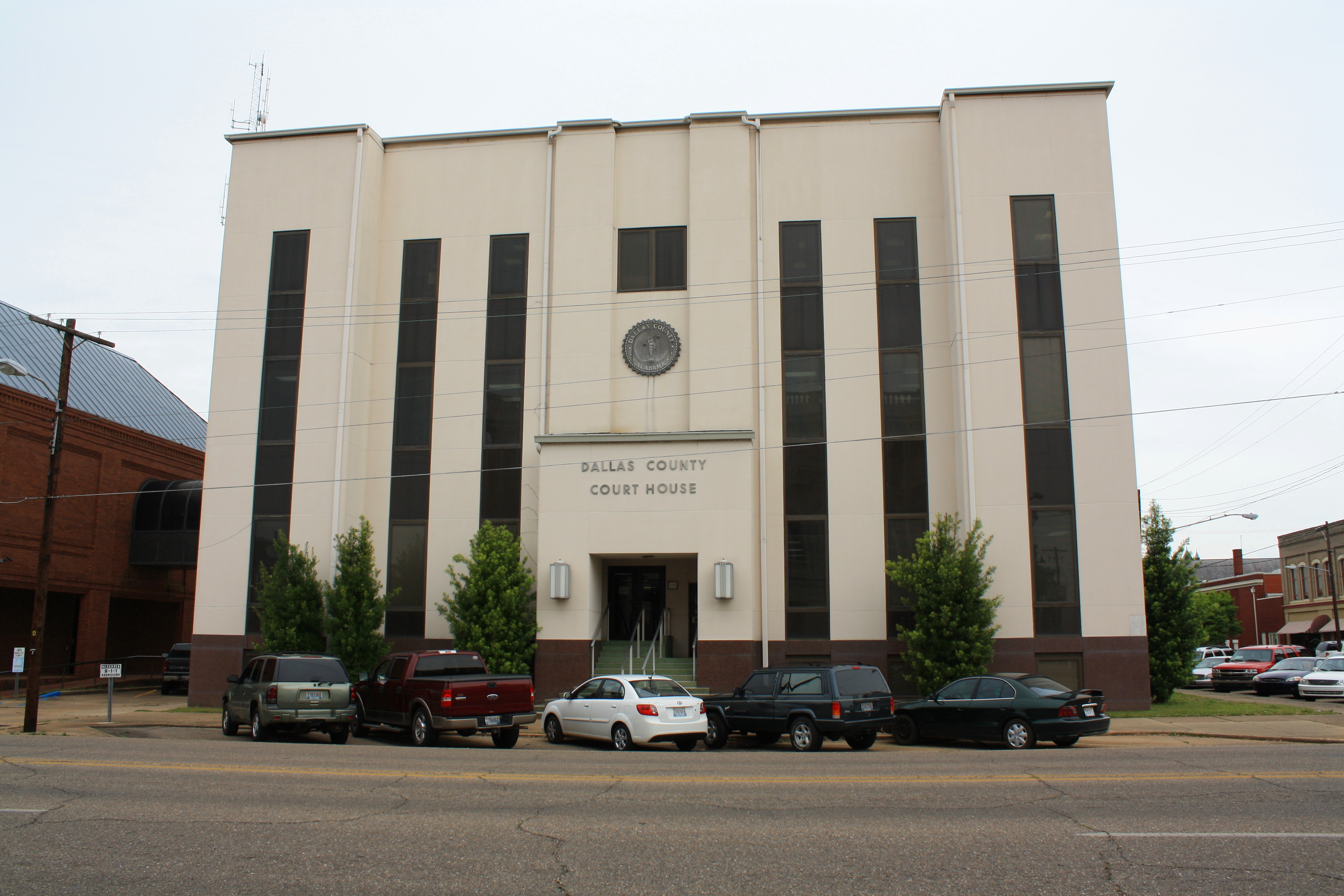
- Dallas County Courthouse in Selma. Built in 1901, it was given an extensive modern makeover in 1960

- Seal

- Location within the U.S. state of Alabama
- Coordinates: 32°19′29″N 87°06′19″W
- Country: United States
- State: Alabama
- Founded: February 9, 1818
- Named for: Alexander J. Dallas
- Seat: Selma
- Largest city: Selma

Area
  - Total: 994 sq mi (2,570 km^{2})
  - Land: 979 sq mi (2,540 km^{2})
  - Water: 15 sq mi (39 km^{2}) 1.5%

Population (2020)
  - Total: 38,462
  - Estimate (2025): 35,140 ▼
  - Density: 39.3/sq mi (15.2/km^{2})
- Time zone: UTC−6 (Central)
  - Summer (DST): UTC−5 (CDT)
- Congressional district: 7th
- Website: www.dallascounty-al.org
- County Number 27 on Alabama Licence Plates

Dallas County is a county located in the central part of the U.S. state of Alabama. As of the 2020 census, its population was 38,462. The county seat is Selma. Its name is in honor of United States Secretary of the Treasury Alexander J. Dallas, who served from 1814 to 1816.

Dallas County comprises the Selma, AL Micropolitan Statistical Area.

== History ==
Dallas County was created by the Alabama territorial legislature on February 9, 1818, from Montgomery County. This was a portion of the Creek cession of lands to the US government of August 9, 1814. The Creek were known as one of the Five Civilized Tribes of the Southeast. The county was named for U.S. Treasury Secretary Alexander J. Dallas of Pennsylvania.

Dallas County is located in what has become known as the Black Belt region of the west-central portion of the state. The name referred to its fertile soil, and the area was largely developed for cotton plantations, worked by numerous enslaved African Americans in the antebellum period. After emancipation following the Civil War, many of the African Americans stayed in the area and worked as sharecroppers and tenant farmers. The county has been majority black since before the war.

Dallas County produced more cotton by 1860 than any other county in the state, requiring a large supply of workers, who were mostly enslaved. Dallas County slave owners on average had seventeen enslaved workers (compared to ten in Montgomery County, for instance); slave owners made up some 16% of the county's white population, but if their families are added, at least a third of the county's population was attached to a slaveholding family, according to historian Alston Fitts.

Well-known local slaveowners include Washington Smith, owner of a big plantation in Bogue Chitto, Alabama, near Selma, and founder of the Bank of Selma. After Emancipation he continued to exert great influence over the African-American people in the county. Shortly before the war, Smith had bought a West African girl, Redoshi, one of an illegal shipment of slaves in 1860. He called her Sally Smith. She was from Benin, kidnapped at age 12 and one of numerous African captives transported on the Clotilda to Mobile, Alabama, more than 50 years after the slave trade had been abolished.

The county is traversed by the Alabama River, flowing from northeast to southwest across the county. It is bordered by Perry, Chilton, Autauga, Lowndes, Wilcox, and Marengo counties. Originally, the Dallas county seat was at Cahaba, which also served as the state capital for a brief period. In 1865, the county seat was transferred to Selma, Alabama as the center of population had moved. Other towns and communities in the still mostly rural county include Marion Junction, Sardis, Orrville, Valley Grande, and Minter.

=== 20th century to present ===
Cotton production suffered in the early 20th century due to infestation of boll weevil, which invaded cotton areas throughout the South. At the turn of the 20th century, the state legislature disenfranchised most blacks and many poor whites through provisions of a new state constitution requiring payment of poll tax and passing a literacy test for voter registration. These largely survived legal challenges and blacks were excluded from the political system.

The period from 1877 to 1950 (and especially 1890 through 1930), was the height of lynchings across the South, as whites worked to impose white supremacy and Jim Crow. According to the third edition of Lynching in America, Dallas County had 19 lynchings in this period, the second-highest number of any county in the state after Jefferson County. The lynching mobs killed suspects of alleged crimes, but also for behavior that offended a white man, and for labor organizing. In the early and mid-20th century, a total of 6.5 million blacks left the South in the Great Migration to escape these oppressive conditions.

In the postwar era of the 1950s and 1960s, African Americans, including many veterans, mounted new efforts across the South to be able to exercise their constitutional right as citizens to register and vote.

The still mostly rural county reached a peak of population in 1960. Younger people have since left to seek work elsewhere. The county is working on new directions for economic development.

From 1963 through 1965, Selma and Dallas County were the sites of a renewed Voting Rights campaign. It was organized by locals of the Dallas County Voters League (DCVL), and joined by activists from Student Nonviolent Coordinating Committee (SNCC). In late 1964 they invited help from the Southern Christian Leadership Conference (SCLC); with SCLC president Martin Luther King Jr. participating, this campaign attracted national and international news in February and March 1965. They planned a march from Selma to the state capital of Montgomery, Alabama. Two activists were killed during demonstrations before the final march took place.

On March 7, several hundred peaceful marchers were beaten by state troopers and county posse after they passed over the Edmund Pettus Bridge and into the county, intending to march to the state capital of Montgomery. The events were covered by national media. The protesters renewed their walk on March 21, having been joined by thousands of sympathizers from across the country and gained federal protection, to complete the Selma to Montgomery marches. More people joined them, so that some 25,000 people entered Montgomery on the last day of the march. In August of that year, Congress passed the Voting Rights Act of 1965, which was signed by President Lyndon B. Johnson. Millions of African-American citizens across the South have registered and voted in the subsequent years, participating again in the political system.

On March 5, 2018, Selma commemorated these marches. In addition, the city conducted a Community Remembrance Project, unveiling a new historic marker to memorialize the 19 African Americans who were lynched in Dallas County by whites during the late 19th and up to mid-20th century in acts of racial terrorism. This was done in cooperation with the Equal Justice Initiative, which published a report in 2015 that documented nearly 4,000 such lynchings, as well as Selma Center for Nonviolence Truth and Reconciliation at Healing Waters Retreat Center, Selma: Truth, Racial Healing & Transformation, and the Black Belt Community Foundation.

== Geography ==
According to the United States Census Bureau, the county has a total area of 994 square miles (2,570 km^{2}), of which 979 square miles (2,540 km^{2}) is land and 15 square miles (39 km^{2}) (1.5%) is water.

=== Adjacent counties ===
- Chilton County (north)
- Autauga County (northeast)
- Lowndes County (southeast)
- Wilcox County (south)
- Marengo County (west)
- Perry County (northwest)

=== National protected areas ===
- Selma to Montgomery National Historic Trail (part)
- Talladega National Forest (part)

== Transportation ==
=== Major highways ===
- U.S. Highway 80 / State Route 8 (unsigned)
- State Route 5
- State Route 14
- State Route 22
- State Route 41
- State Route 66
- State Route 89
- State Route 140
- State Route 219

=== Airports ===
- Craig Field (SEM) in Selma
- Skyharbor Airport (S63) in Selma

== Demographics ==
Historical population
Census	Pop.	Note	%±
1820	6,003		—
1830	14,017		133.5%
1840	25,199		79.8%
1850	29,727		18.0%
1860	33,625		13.1%
1870	40,705		21.1%
1880	48,433		19.0%
1890	49,350		1.9%
1900	54,657		10.8%
1910	53,401		−2.3%
1920	54,697		2.4%
1930	55,094		0.7%
1940	55,245		0.3%
1950	56,270		1.9%
1960	56,667		0.7%
1970	55,296		−2.4%
1980	53,981		−2.4%
1990	48,130		−10.8%
2000	46,365		−3.7%
2010	43,820		−5.5%
2020	38,462		−12.2%
2025 (est.)	35,140	▼	−8.6%
U.S. Decennial Census; 1790–1960 1900–1990; 1990–2000 2010–2020

=== Racial and ethnic composition ===
Dallas County, Alabama – Racial and ethnic composition Note: the US Census treats Hispanic/Latino as an ethnic category. This table excludes Latinos from the racial categories and assigns them to a separate category. Hispanics/Latinos may be of any race.
Race / Ethnicity (NH = Non-Hispanic)	Pop 1980	Pop 1990	Pop 2000	Pop 2010	Pop 2020	% 1980	% 1990	% 2000	% 2010	% 2020
White alone (NH)	24,099	20,054	16,417	12,676	10,363	44.64%	41.67%	35.41%	28.93%	26.94%
Black or African American alone (NH)	29,022	27,768	29,201	30,314	26,812	53.76%	57.69%	62.98%	69.18%	69.71%
Native American or Alaska Native alone (NH)	37	41	47	78	56	0.07%	0.09%	0.10%	0.18%	0.15%
Asian alone (NH)	51	129	157	144	145	0.09%	0.27%	0.34%	0.33%	0.38%
Native Hawaiian or Pacific Islander alone (NH)	x	x	4	6	12	x	x	0.01%	0.01%	0.03%
Other race alone (NH)	178	7	26	15	38	0.33%	0.01%	0.06%	0.03%	0.10%
Mixed race or Multiracial (NH)	x	x	223	278	740	x	x	0.48%	0.63%	1.92%
Hispanic or Latino (any race)	594	131	290	309	296	1.10%	0.27%	0.63%	0.71%	0.77%
Total	53,981	48,130	46,365	43,820	38,462	100.00%	100.00%	100.00%	100.00%	100.00%

=== 2020 census ===
As of the 2020 census, the county had a population of 38,462. The median age was 42.3 years. 23.0% of residents were under the age of 18 and 19.0% of residents were 65 years of age or older. For every 100 females there were 87.4 males, and for every 100 females age 18 and over there were 83.0 males age 18 and over.

The racial makeup of the county was 27.1% White, 69.9% Black or African American, 0.2% American Indian and Alaska Native, 0.4% Asian, 0.0% Native Hawaiian and Pacific Islander, 0.3% from some other race, and 2.1% from two or more races. Hispanic or Latino residents of any race comprised 0.8% of the population.

55.1% of residents lived in urban areas, while 44.9% lived in rural areas.

There were 16,037 households in the county, of which 29.4% had children under the age of 18 living with them and 43.0% had a female householder with no spouse or partner present. About 33.1% of all households were made up of individuals and 14.0% had someone living alone who was 65 years of age or older.

There were 18,880 housing units, of which 15.1% were vacant. Among occupied housing units, 60.4% were owner-occupied and 39.6% were renter-occupied. The homeowner vacancy rate was 2.2% and the rental vacancy rate was 8.3%.

=== 2010 census ===
Residents identified by the following ethnicities, according to the 2010 United States census:

- 69.4% Black
- 29.0% White
- 0.3% Native American
- 0.3% Asian
- 0.0% Native Hawaiian or Pacific Islander
- 0.7% Two or more races
- 0.7% Hispanic or Latino (of any race)

=== 2000 census ===
As of the census of 2000, there were 46,365 people, 17,841 households, and 12,488 families residing in the county. The population density was 47 people per square mile (18 people/km^{2}). There were 20,450 housing units at an average density of 21 units per square mile (8.1 units/km^{2}). The racial makeup of the county was 63.26% Black or African American, 35.58% White, 0.11% Native American, 0.35% Asian, 0.01% Pacific Islander, 0.14% from other races, and 0.55% from two or more races. 0.63% of the population were Hispanic or Latino of any race.

There were 17,841 households, out of which 33.50% had children under the age of 18 living with them, 40.40% were married couples living together, 25.40% had a female householder with no husband present, and 30.00% were non-families. Nearly 27.80% of all households were made up of individuals, and 11.60% had someone living alone who was 65 years of age or older. The average household size was 2.57 and the average family size was 3.15.

In the county, the population was spread out, with 28.60% under the age of 18, 9.40% from 18 to 24, 26.20% from 25 to 44, 21.90% from 45 to 64, and 13.90% who were 65 years of age or older. The median age was 35 years. For every 100 females, there were 83.50 males. For every 100 females age 18 and over, there were 77.80 males age 18 and over.

The median income for a household in the county was $23,370, and the median income for a family was $29,906. Males had a median income of $31,568 versus $18,683 for females. The per capita income for the county was $13,638. About 27.20% of families and 31.10% of the population were below the poverty line, including 40.70% of those under age 18 and 27.60% of those age 65 or over.

== Government and politics ==
Dallas County is governed by a five-member county commission, elected from single-member districts.

Along with the rest of the Black Belt, Dallas County is solidly Democratic. Although African Americans supported the Republican Party during Reconstruction and into the early 20th century, they have supported Democratic candidates since the mid-1960s. No Republican has carried the county since Richard Nixon's 3,000-county-plus landslide in 1972.

United States presidential election results for Dallas County, Alabama
Year	Republican		Democratic		Third party(ies)	
Year	No.	%	No.	%	No.	%
1824	235	29.60%	411	51.76%	148	18.64%
1828	124	14.29%	744	85.71%	0	0.00%
1832	0	0.00%	278	100.00%	0	0.00%
1836	916	66.76%	456	33.24%	0	0.00%
1840	1,024	59.78%	689	40.22%	0	0.00%
1844	864	54.48%	722	45.52%	0	0.00%
1848	860	58.19%	618	41.81%	0	0.00%
1852	386	36.07%	440	41.12%	244	22.80%
1856	0	0.00%	831	55.14%	676	44.86%
1860	0	0.00%	339	18.92%	1,453	81.08%
1868	7,137	80.05%	1,779	19.95%	0	0.00%
1872	7,081	78.55%	1,934	21.45%	0	0.00%
1876	3,930	70.95%	1,609	29.05%	0	0.00%
1880	1,108	38.18%	1,794	61.82%	0	0.00%
1884	2,023	40.03%	3,026	59.87%	5	0.10%
1888	2,090	28.26%	5,302	71.69%	4	0.05%
1892	1,028	11.04%	7,339	78.80%	947	10.17%
1896	519	11.11%	4,091	87.56%	62	1.33%
1900	161	3.22%	4,714	94.26%	126	2.52%
1904	36	2.36%	1,472	96.65%	15	0.98%
1908	28	1.91%	1,420	97.06%	15	1.03%
1912	16	1.06%	1,461	96.69%	34	2.25%
1916	23	1.44%	1,565	97.87%	11	0.69%
1920	78	2.81%	2,702	97.19%	0	0.00%
1924	50	2.36%	1,948	91.76%	125	5.89%
1928	705	27.00%	1,905	72.96%	1	0.04%
1932	93	2.97%	3,027	96.62%	13	0.41%
1936	49	1.50%	3,205	98.37%	4	0.12%
1940	157	4.81%	3,106	95.10%	3	0.09%
1944	149	4.90%	2,883	94.74%	11	0.36%
1948	132	4.60%	0	0.00%	2,738	95.40%
1952	2,550	55.05%	2,082	44.95%	0	0.00%
1956	2,324	43.37%	2,121	39.59%	913	17.04%
1960	2,872	56.94%	2,103	41.69%	69	1.37%
1964	5,888	89.12%	0	0.00%	719	10.88%
1968	1,246	7.49%	6,516	39.17%	8,874	53.34%
1972	8,644	60.53%	5,427	38.00%	209	1.46%
1976	7,144	43.66%	8,866	54.19%	351	2.15%
1980	7,647	42.14%	9,770	53.84%	730	4.02%
1984	9,585	46.26%	10,955	52.88%	178	0.86%
1988	7,630	43.79%	9,660	55.44%	133	0.76%
1992	7,394	37.72%	11,053	56.38%	1,157	5.90%
1996	6,612	37.45%	10,507	59.52%	535	3.03%
2000	7,360	39.86%	10,967	59.40%	137	0.74%
2004	7,335	39.49%	11,175	60.17%	63	0.34%
2008	6,798	32.60%	13,986	67.07%	68	0.33%
2012	6,288	29.99%	14,612	69.70%	64	0.31%
2016	5,789	30.81%	12,836	68.31%	167	0.89%
2020	5,524	30.92%	12,230	68.46%	110	0.62%
2024	5,190	33.38%	10,236	65.84%	121	0.78%

United States Senate election results for Dallas County, Alabama2
Year	Republican		Democratic		Third party(ies)	
Year	No.	%	No.	%	No.	%
2020	5,298	29.74%	12,503	70.18%	15	0.08%

United States Senate election results for Dallas County, Alabama3
Year	Republican		Democratic		Third party(ies)	
Year	No.	%	No.	%	No.	%
2022	5,190	33.38%	10,236	65.84%	121	0.78%

Alabama Gubernatorial election results for Dallas County
Year	Republican		Democratic		Third party(ies)	
Year	No.	%	No.	%	No.	%
2022	4,060	35.77%	7,165	63.12%	126	1.11%

== Education ==
Areas not in Selma are served by Dallas County Schools, while areas in Selma are served by Selma City Schools.

== Communities ==
=== Cities ===
- Selma (county seat)
- Valley Grande

=== Towns ===
- Orrville

=== Census-designated places ===
- Selmont-West Selmont

=== Unincorporated communities ===
- Beloit
- Bogue Chitto
- Browns
- Burnsville
- Carlowville
- Crumptonia
- Elm Bluff
- Harrell
- Manila
- Marion Junction
- Minter
- Plantersville
- Pleasant Hill
- Richmond
- Safford
- Sardis
- Summerfield
- Tyler

=== Ghost town ===
- Cahaba

== Notable residents ==
- Kenneth D. McKellar, American Politician from Tennessee
- Gunnar Henderson, Professional baseball Player from Selma

== Notable inhabitants ==
- Redoshi, a woman originally from Benin, West-Africa, kidnapped and sold to a Dallas County slave owner.

== See also ==
- National Register of Historic Places listings in Dallas County, Alabama
- Properties on the Alabama Register of Landmarks and Heritage in Dallas County, Alabama
