= Plantersville, Alabama =

Unincorporated community in Alabama, United States

- Unincorporated community
- Location in Alabama Plantersville (the United States)
- Coordinates: 32°39′24″N 86°55′28″W
- Country: United States
- State: Alabama
- County: Dallas
- Elevation: 246 ft (75 m)

Population (2010)
  - Total: 1,412
- Time zone: UTC-6 (Central (CST))
  - Summer (DST): UTC-5 (CDT)
- ZIP code: 36758
- Area code: 251
- GNIS feature ID: 160398
- Website: http://plantersville.us

Plantersville is an unincorporated community in Dallas County, Alabama, United States. It lies near the county's border with Autauga and Chilton counties. Plantersville was named for the local cotton planters and plantations. The town is home to Dallas County High School and J. E. Terry Elementary School.

== History ==
The original name of the town was Corinth. The post office was established in 1867.

After the Civil War Battle of Ebenezer Church (April 1, 1865), Union troops burned the railroad depot at Plantersville and a cotton warehouse. Maj. Gen. James H. Wilson's troops spent the night camped in Plantersville, then on to the Battle of Selma the next day. Provisional governor Lewis E. Parsons, later describing the horrors of the war, said that "indeed, after three weeks had elapsed, it was with difficulty you could travel the road from Plantersville to that city (i.e. Selma), so offensive was the atmosphere, in consequence of decaying horses and mules that lay along the road-side. Every description of ruin, except the interred dead of the human family, met the eye. I witnessed it myself. The fact is, that no description can equal the reality."

Pickering's Grocery Store has been replaced by a gas station and convenience store.
