= List of high schools in Alabama =

This is a list of high schools in the state of Alabama, United States.

== Autauga County ==
- Billingsley High School, Billingsley
- Marbury High School, Marbury

=== Prattville ===
- Autauga Academy
- Autauga County Technology Center
- Prattville High School

== Baldwin County ==
- Gulf Shores High School, Gulf Shores
- Orange Beach High School, Orange Beach
- Spanish Fort High School, Spanish Fort

=== Bay Minette ===
- Baldwin County High School
- North Baldwin Center for Technology

=== Daphne ===
- Bayside Academy
- Daphne High School

=== Fairhope ===
- Bayshore Christian School
- Fairhope High School
- St. Michael Catholic High School

=== Foley ===
- Foley High School
- Snook Christian Academy

=== Robertsdale ===
- Central Christian School
- Robertsdale High School
- South Baldwin Center for Technology

== Barbour County ==
- Barbour County High School, Clayton

=== Eufaula ===
- Eufaula High School
- The Lakeside School

== Bibb County ==
=== Centreville ===
- Bibb County High School
- Cahawba Christian Academy

=== West Blocton ===
- Bibb County Career Academy
- West Blocton High School

== Blount County ==
- Hayden High School, Hayden
- Locust Fork High School, Locust Fork

=== Blountsville ===
- J.B. Pennington High School
- Susan Moore High School

=== Cleveland ===
- Blount County Career Technical Center
- Cleveland High School

=== Oneonta ===
- Appalachian School
- Oneonta High School

== Bullock County ==
=== Union Springs ===
- Bullock County High School
- Bullock County Career Technical Center
- Conecuh Springs Christian School

== Butler County ==
- Georgiana School, Georgiana
- McKenzie School, McKenzie

=== Greenville ===
- Fort Dale Academy
- Greenville High School

== Calhoun County ==
- Alexandria High School, Alexandria
- Ohatchee High School, Ohatchee
- Piedmont High School, Piedmont
- Sacred Heart of Jesus Catholic School, Fort McClellan
- Weaver High School, Weaver

=== Anniston ===
- Anniston High School
- The Donoho School
- Faith Christian School
- Saks High School
- Walter Wellborn High School
- White Plains High School

=== Jacksonville ===
- Calhoun County Career Academy
- Jacksonville Christian Academy
- Jacksonville High School
- Pleasant Valley High School

=== Oxford ===
- Oxford High School
- Trinity Christian Academy

== Chambers County ==
- Valley High School, Valley

=== Lafayette ===
- Chambers Academy
- Lafayette High School

=== Lanett ===
- Lanett High School
- Springwood School

== Cherokee County ==
- Cedar Bluff School, Cedar Bluff
- Gaylesville School, Gaylesville
- Sand Rock School, Sand Rock
- Spring Garden School, Spring Garden

=== Centre ===
- Cherokee County Career & Technology Center
- Cherokee County High School

== Chilton County ==
- Chilton County High School, Clanton
- Thorsby High School, Thorsby
- Verbena High School, Verbena

=== Jemison ===
- Chilton Christian Academy
- Jemison High School

=== Maplesville ===
- Isabella High School
- Maplesville High School

== Choctaw County ==
- South Choctaw Academy, Toxey
- Southern Choctaw High School, Gilbertown

=== Butler ===
- Choctaw County High School
- Patrician Academy

== Clarke County ==
- Thomasville High School, Thomasville

=== Grove Hill ===
- Clarke County High School
- Clarke Preparatory School

=== Jackson ===
- Jackson Academy
- Jackson High School

== Clay County ==
- Central High School of Clay County, Lineville

=== Ashland ===
- Clay County Christian Academy
- First Assembly Christian School

== Cleburne County ==
- Ranburne High School, Ranburne

=== Heflin ===
- Cleburne County High School
- Cleburne County Career Technical School

== Coffee County ==
- Elba High School, Elba
- Enterprise High School, Enterprise
- Kinston High School, Kinston
- New Brockton High School, New Brockton
- Zion Chapel High School, Jack

== Colbert County ==
- Cherokee High School, Cherokee
- Colbert County High School, Leighton
- Sheffield High School, Sheffield

=== Muscle Shoals ===
- Muscle Shoals Career Academy
- Muscle Shoals High School

=== Tuscumbia ===
- Colbert Heights High School
- Deshler High School/Career Center

== Conecuh County ==
=== Evergreen ===
- Hillcrest High School
- Sparta Academy

== Coosa County ==
- Central High School, Rockford

== Covington County ==
- Florala High School, Florala
- Opp High School, Opp
- Red Level High School, Red Level

=== Andalusia ===
- Andalusia High School
- Pleasant Home School
- Straughn High School

== Crenshaw County ==
- Brantley High School, Brantley
- Highland Home High School, Highland Home

=== Luverne ===
- Crenshaw Christian Academy
- Luverne High School

== Cullman County ==
- Cold Springs High School, Bremen
- Good Hope High School, Good Hope
- Hanceville High School, Hanceville
- Holly Pond High School, Holly Pond
- Vinemont High School, South Vinemont

=== Cullman ===
- Cullman Christian School
- Fairview High School
- St. Bernard Preparatory School
- West Point High School
- Cullman High School

== Dale County ==
- Ariton School, Ariton
- Carroll High School, Ozark
- Dale County High School, Midland City
- Daleville High School, Daleville
- G. W. Long High School, Skipperville

== Dallas County ==
- Dallas County High School, Plantersville
- Keith Middle-High School, Orrville

=== Selma ===
- Cathedral Christian Academy
- Dallas County Career Technical Center
- Ellwood Christian Academy
- Meadowview Christian School
- Morgan Academy
- Selma High School
- Southside High School

== Dekalb County ==
- Collinsville High School, Collinsville
- Crossville High School, Crossville
- Fort Payne High School, Fort Payne
- Fyffe High School, Fyffe
- Geraldine High School, Geraldine
- Ider High School, Ider
- Sylvania High School, Sylvania
- Valley Head High School, Valley Head

=== Rainsville ===
- Cornerstone Christian Academy
- DeKalb County Technology Center
- Plainview High School

== Elmore County ==
- Edgewood Academy, Elmore
- Elmore County High School, Eclectic
- Holtville High School, Deatsville
- Tallassee High School, Tallassee
- Wetumpka High School, Wetumpka

=== Millbrook ===
- New Life Christian Academy
- Stanhope Elmore High School
- Victory Christian Academy

== Escambia County ==
- Flomaton High School, Flomaton
- W. S. Neal High School, East Brewton

=== Brewton ===
- Escambia Career Readiness Center
- T. R. Miller High School

=== Atmore ===
- Atmore Christian School
- Escambia Academy
- Escambia County High School
- Temple Christian Academy

== Etowah County ==
- Glencoe High School, Glencoe
- Hokes Bluff High School, Hokes Bluff
- Sardis High School, Sardis
- Southside High School, Southside
- West End High School, Walnut Grove
- Westbrook Christian School, Rainbow City

=== Attalla ===
- Etowah County Career Technical Center
- Etowah High School

=== Gadsden ===
- Coosa Christian School
- Episcopal Day School
- Gadsden City High School
- Gaston High School

== Fayette County ==
- Berry High School, Berry
- Fayette County High School, Fayette
- Hubbertville School, Hubertville

== Franklin County ==
- Phil Campbell High School, Phil Campbell
- Red Bay High School, Red Bay
- Vina High School, Vina

=== Russellville ===
- Belgreen High School
- Franklin County Career Technical Center
- Russellville High School
- Tharptown High School

== Geneva County ==
- Geneva High School, Geneva
- Geneva County High School, Hartford
- Samson High School, Samson
- Slocomb High School, Slocomb

== Greene County ==
- Greene County High School, Eutaw

== Hale County ==
- Greensboro High School, Greensboro
- Hale County High School, Moundville
- Southern Academy, Greensboro

== Henry County ==
- Headland High School, Headland

=== Abbeville ===
- Abbeville Christian Academy
- Abbeville High School

== Houston County ==
- Ashford High School, Ashford
- Cottonwood High School, Cottonwood
- Houston County High School, Columbia
- Rehobeth High School, Rehobeth
- Wicksburg High School, Wicksburg

=== Dothan ===
- Dothan High School
- Dothan Technology Center
- Emmanuel Christian School
- Houston Academy
- Houston County Career Academy
- Northside Methodist Academy
- Providence Christian School

== Jackson County ==
- Earnest Pruett Center of Technology, Hollywood
- Mountain View Christian Academy, Bryant
- North Jackson High School, Stevenson
- North Sand Mountain School, Higdon
- Pisgah High School, Pisgah
- Section High School, Section
- Woodville High School, Woodville, Alabama

=== Scottsboro ===
- Scottsboro High School
- Skyline High School

== Jefferson County ==
- Center Point High School, Center Point
- Clay-Chalkville High School, Clay
- Corner High School, Dora
- Fultondale High School, Fultondale
- Hewitt-Trussville High School, Trussville
- Homewood High School, Homewood
- Hueytown High School, Hueytown
- Leeds High School, Leeds
- McAdory High School, McCalla
- Midfield High School, Midfield
- Minor High School, Adamsville
- Mortimer Jordan High School, Morris
- Mountain Brook High School, Mountain Brook
- Pinson Valley High School, Pinson
- Pleasant Grove High School, Pleasant Grove
- Tarrant High School, Tarrant
- Vestavia Hills High School, Vestavia Hills

=== Bessemer ===
- Bessemer Academy
- Bessemer Center for Technology
- Bessemer City High School
- Oak Grove High School

=== Birmingham ===
- A. H. Parker High School
- Alabama School of Fine Arts
- Altamont School
- Banks Academy
- Carver High School
- Cornerstone Christian Schools
- Glen Iris Baptist School
- Holy Family Cristo Rey High School
- Huffman High School
- Islamic Academy of Alabama
- Jackson-Olin High School
- John Carroll Catholic High School
- Ramsay High School
- Rock City Preparatory Christian School
- Spring Valley School
- Wenonah High School
- Woodlawn High School

=== Fairfield ===
- Fairfield High Preparatory School
- Restoration Academy

=== Gardendale ===
- Gardendale High School
- Tabernacle Christian School

=== Hoover ===
- Hoover Christian School
- Hoover High School

=== Irondale ===
- Jefferson County International Baccalaureate School
- Shades Valley High School

== Lamar County ==
- Lamar County High School, Vernon
- South Lamar School, Millport
- Sulligent High School, Sulligent

== Lauderdale County ==
- Lauderdale County High School, Rogersville
- Lexington High School, Lexington
- Waterloo High School, Waterloo

=== Florence ===
- Central High School
- Florence Freshman Center
- Florence High School
- Mars Hill Bible School
- Rogers High School
- Shoals Christian School

=== Killen ===
- Allen Thornton Career Tech Center
- Brooks High School

== Lawrence County ==
- East Lawrence High School, Trinity
- Hatton High School, Town Creek

=== Moulton ===
- Lawrence County Career Technical Center
- Lawrence County High School

== Lee County ==
- Beulah High School, Beulah
- Loachapoka High School, Loachapoka

=== Auburn ===
- Auburn High School
- Lee-Scott Academy

=== Opelika ===
- Beauregard High School
- The Oaks School
- Opelika High School

=== Smiths Station ===
- Glenwood School
- Smiths Station Freshman Center
- Smiths Station High School

== Limestone County ==
- Ardmore High School, Ardmore
- Elkmont High School, Elkmont
- Tanner High School, Tanner
- West Limestone High School, Lester

=== Athens ===
- Athens Bible School
- Athens High School
- Clements High School
- East Limestone High School
- Limestone County Career Technical Center
- Lindsay Lane Christian Academy

=== Madison ===
- James Clemens High School (Even though it is located in Limestone County, most of its students come from Madison County.)

== Lowndes County ==
- Calhoun High School, Letohatchee
- Central High School, Hayneville
- Lowndes Academy, Lowndesboro

== Macon County ==
- Booker T. Washington High School, Tuskegee
- Notasulga High School, Notasulga

== Madison County ==
- Buckhorn High School, New Market
- Hazel Green High School, Hazel Green
- Madison County High School, Gurley
- New Hope High School, New Hope
- Sparkman High School, Harvest

=== Huntsville ===
==== Public ====
- Alabama School of Cyber Technology and Engineering
- Columbia High School
- Grissom High School
- Huntsville High School
- Jemison High School
- Lee High School
- Madison County Career Tech Center
- New Century Technology High School

==== Private ====
- Huntsville Christian Academy
- Oakwood Adventist Academy
- Pope John Paul II Catholic High School
- Randolph School
- Union Chapel Christian Academy
- Valley Fellowship Christian Academy

=== Madison ===
- Bob Jones High School
- Madison Academy

== Marengo County ==
- Amelia Love Johnson High School, Thomaston
- Linden High School, Linden
- Marengo High School, Dixons Mills
- Sweet Water High School, Sweet Water

=== Demopolis ===
- Demopolis High School

== Marion County ==
- Brilliant High School, Brilliant
- Hackleburg High School, Hackleburg
- Hamilton High School, Hamilton
- Marion County High School, Guin
- Phillips High School, Bear Creek
- Winfield High School, Winfield

== Marshall County ==
- Arab High School, Arab
- Boaz High School, Boaz
- Douglas High School, Douglas
- Kate Duncan Smith DAR School, Grant

=== Albertville ===
- Albertville High School
- Asbury High School
- Marshall Christian School

=== Guntersville ===
- Brindlee Mountain High School
- Guntersville High School
- Marshall Technical School

== Mobile County ==
- Chickasaw City High School, Chickasaw
- Citronelle High School, Citronelle
- Mary G. Montgomery High School, Semmes
- Mattie T. Blount High School, Eight Mile
- Saraland High School, Saraland
- Satsuma High School, Satsuma

=== Irvington ===
- Alma Bryant High School
- Bryant Career Tech Center

=== Mobile ===
==== Public ====
- Alabama School of Mathematics and Science
- Augusta Evans School
- B.C. Rain High School
- Baker High School
- Davidson High School
- John L. LeFlore Magnet High School of Advanced Communication and Fine Performing Arts
- Murphy High School
- Williamson High School

==== Private ====
- Al-Iman Academy of Mobile
- Cottage Hill Christian Academy
- Faith Academy
- Government Street Christian School
- McGill-Toolen Catholic High School
- Mobile Christian School
- St. Luke's Episcopal School
- St. Paul's Episcopal School
- UMS-Wright Preparatory School

=== Prichard ===
- Faulkner Career Tech Center
- Vigor High School

=== Theodore ===
- Lighthouse Baptist Academy
- Theodore High School

== Monroe County ==
- Excel High School, Excel
- J. F. Shields High School, Beatrice
- J. U. Blacksher School, Uriah

=== Monroeville ===
- Monroe Academy
- Monroe County High School

== Montgomery County ==
=== Montgomery ===
==== Public ====
- Booker T. Washington Magnet High School
- Brewbaker Technology Magnet High School
- Dr. Percy L. Julian High School
- George Washington Carver High School
- Johnson Abernathy Graetz High School
- Lanier High School (closed)
- Loveless Academic Magnet Program
- McIntrye Comprehensive Academy
- Montgomery Preparatory Academy for Career Technologies
- Park Crossing High School

==== Private ====
- Alabama Christian Academy
- Montgomery Academy
- Montgomery Catholic Preparatory School
- Saint James School
- Trinity Presbyterian School

== Morgan County ==
- Albert P. Brewer High School, Somerville
- Danville High School, Danville
- Falkville High School, Falkville
- Hartselle High School, Hartselle
- Priceville High School, Priceville
- West Morgan High School, Trinity

=== Decatur ===
- Austin High School
- Decatur High School

== Perry County ==
- Robert C. Hatch, Uniontown

=== Marion ===
- Francis Marion School

== Pickens County ==
- Aliceville High School, Aliceville
- Gordo High School, Gordo
- Pickens County High School, Reform
- Pickens Academy, Carrollton

== Pike County ==
- Goshen High School, Goshen
- Pike County High School, Brundidge

=== Troy ===
- Charles Henderson High School

== Randolph County ==
- Handley High School, Roanoke
- Randolph County High School, Wedowee
- Wadley High School, Wadley
- Woodland High School, Woodland

== Russell County ==
- Central High School, Phenix City
- Russell County High School, Seale

== St. Clair County ==
- Ragland School, Ragland
- St. Clair County High School, Odenville
- Springville High School, Springville

=== Ashville ===
- Ashville High School
- Eden Career Technical Center

=== Moody ===
- Moody High School
- Virtual Preparatory Academy

=== Pell City ===
- Pell City High School
- Victory Christian School

== Shelby County ==
- Calera High School, Calera
- Chelsea High School, Chelsea
- Coosa Valley Academy, Harpersville
- Indian Springs School, Indian Springs Village
- Montevallo High School, Montevallo
- Pelham High School, Pelham
- Spain Park High School, Hoover
- Vincent High School, Vincent

=== Alabaster ===
- Evangel Christian School
- Thompson High School

=== Birmingham ===
- Briarwood Christian School
- Oak Mountain High School

=== Columbiana ===
- Shelby County Career/Tech Education Center
- Shelby County High School

=== Helena ===
- Helena High School

== Sumter County ==
- Sumter Central High School, York
- University Charter School, Livingston

== Talladega County ==
- Childersburg High School, Childersburg
- Lincoln High School, Lincoln
- Munford High School, Munford
- Winterboro High School, Alpine
- B.B. Comer Memorial High School, Mignon

=== Sylacauga ===
- Fayetteville High School
- Sylacauga High School

=== Talladega ===
- Alabama Institute for the Deaf and Blind
- Talladega County Schools
- Talladega Career/Technical Center
- Talladega High School

== Tallapoosa County ==
- Benjamin Russell High School, Alexander City
- Dadeville High School, Dadeville
- Horseshoe Bend High School, New Site
- Reeltown High School, Notasulga

=== Camp Hill ===
- Edward Bell Career Tech Center
- Southern Preparatory Academy

== Tuscaloosa County ==
- Brookwood High School, Brookwood
- Holt High School, Holt
- Sipsey Valley High School, Romulus

=== Cottondale ===
- Paul W. Bryant High School

=== Tuscaloosa ===
- American Christian Academy
- Central High School
- Hillcrest High School
- Holy Spirit Catholic School
- Northridge High School
- Tuscaloosa Academy
- Tuscaloosa Career & Technology Academy

=== Northport ===
- Northside High School
- Tuscaloosa County High School

== Walker County ==
- Carbon Hill High School, Carbon Hill
- Cordova High School, Cordova
- Curry High School, Curry
- Dora High School, Dora
- Oakman High School, Oakman
- Sumiton Christian School, Sumiton

=== Jasper ===
- Jasper High School
- Walker County Center of Technology

== Washington County ==
- Fruitdale High School, Fruitdale
- Leroy High School, Leroy
- McIntosh High School, McIntosh
- Millry High School, Millry

=== Chatom ===
- Washington County Career Technical Center
- Washington County High School

== Wilcox County ==
=== Camden ===
- Camden School of Arts & Technology
- Wilcox Academy
- Wilcox Central High School

== Winston County ==
- Addison High School, Addison
- Haleyville High School, Haleyville
- Lynn High School, Lynn
- Meek High School, Arley

=== Double Springs ===
- Winston County High School
- Winston County Technical Center
