= Franklin County Schools =

Franklin County Schools or Franklin County School District may refer to:

- Franklin County Public Schools (Kentucky) in Kentucky
- Franklin County School District (Georgia)
- Franklin County School District (Mississippi)
- Franklin County Schools (Alabama)
- Franklin County Schools (Florida)
- Franklin County Schools (North Carolina)
- Franklin County Schools (Tennessee)
- Franklin County Schools (Virginia)
