= Holt High School =

Holt High School may refer to:

- Holt High School (Michigan), Holt, Michigan
- Wentzville Holt High School, Wentzville, Missouri (St. Louis area)
- Childwall Sports and Science Academy formerly known as Holt High School, in Liverpool, England
- Holt High School (Alabama), part of Tuscaloosa County Schools in Alabama
