= Ousmane Cisse =

Malian basketball player (born 1982)

Personal information
- Born: 20 October 1982 (age 43) Bamako, Mali
- Listed height: 6 ft 9 in (2.06 m)
- Listed weight: 235 lb (107 kg)

Career information
- High school: Montgomery Catholic (Montgomery, Alabama); St. Jude Catholic (Montgomery, Alabama)
- NBA draft: 2001: 2nd round, 47th overall pick
- Drafted by: Denver Nuggets
- Playing career: 2001–2010
- Position: Power forward / center

Career history
- 2002: Lokomotiv Mineralnye Vody
- 2002–2003: Harlem Globetrotters
- 2003: Adirondack Wildcats
- 2003–2004: Brevard Blue Ducks
- 2004–2005: Fayetteville Patriots
- 2005–2009: Bnei HaSharon
- 2009–2010: APOEL Nicosia
- 2010: Étendard de Brest

Career highlights
- Israeli League Defensive Player of the Year (2006); Israeli League Rebounding Leader (2006); First-team Parade All-American (2001); McDonald's All-American (2001)
- Stats at Basketball Reference

Ousmane Cisse (born 20 October 1982) is a Malian retired professional basketball player. Standing at 6' 9" he played both power forward and center positions. In 2005-06 he was the top rebounder in the Israel Basketball Premier League, as well as the Israeli Basketball Premier League Defensive Player of the Year.

== High school ==
He moved to the United States from Mali in 1998, and studied at Montgomery Catholic High School in Montgomery, Alabama, U.S., where he and his teammates won the 2A State Championship. In his first appearance as a Catholic Knight, he broke the Alabama High School Athletic Association's record for blocked shots in the first half against Horseshoe Bend. In his sophomore season in high school he posted averages of 20 points, 15 rebounds and 9 blocks per game. He later attended St. Jude Catholic High School in Montgomery, where he transferred to in 1999, and he sat out the 1999–2000 basketball season. In his last year of high school basketball he averaged 29 points, 16 rebounds and 12 blocks, and was widely regarded as one of the best prospects of his class. He drew interest from many high-profile college programs such as Arkansas, Duke, Kentucky, Michigan and North Carolina, but after graduating he signed up to the 2001 NBA draft and was selected as a 47th pick overall by the Denver Nuggets (he was however the 46th player to be selected, as the Minnesota Timberwolves forfeited their 29th overall pick).

== Professional career ==
After he was signed by the Denver Nuggets, he had an injured knee and therefore did not pass the physical tests, and the Nuggets released him. He then moved to Russia in 2002 before playing for the Harlem Globetrotters. After a year he returned to play in the NBA signing with the Orlando Magic. Ousmane was released just after one preseason game and moved to play in the USBL. In 2003, he signed with the Toronto Raptors and was released after a couple of days, without ever playing with the team.

Cisse ended up never appearing in an NBA game and is one of eight players drafted in 2001 to never play a game in the league. Of the high school draftees from 1995 to 2006, he is one of only two, along with Ricky Sánchez, drafted four years after Cisse, who never played a game in the league.

He moved to play in the NBDL after his release during 2003 and stayed to play there until the 2004–05 season was over, playing for the Fayetteville Patriots.

Cisse started his international career when he signed at Bnei HaSharon in Israel for the 2005–06 season. He led the league in rebounds (10.1 per game) and blocks (2.5), but the team finished only in the 9th place. He was also named the Israeli Basketball Premier League Defensive Player of the Year. Ousmane then stayed three more seasons in Bnei HaSharon reaching the State Cup final in the 2006–07 season and finishing at the 3rd place in the Israeli League in 2007–08.

== National team ==
Cisse's only appearance on FIBA Africa Championship was in 2005 where his stats were 6 PPG, 5 RPG and 1 BPG in 7 games, averaging 15.8 minutes per game.
