= Perry County School District =

Perry County School District can refer to:

- Perry County School District (Alabama)
- Perry County School District (Mississippi)
