= Streptomyces scopuliridis =

Scientific classification
- Domain: Bacteria
- Kingdom: Bacillati
- Phylum: Actinomycetota
- Class: Actinomycetia
- Order: Streptomycetales
- Family: Streptomycetaceae
- Genus: Streptomyces
- Species: S. scopuliridis

Binomial name
- Streptomyces scopuliridis Farris et al. 2011

Type strain
- DSM 41917, NRRL B-24574, RB72

Species of bacterium

Streptomyces scopuliridis is a bacterium species from the genus of Streptomyces which has been isolated from woodland soil from Rainbow Bluff in Lynn in Alabama in the United States. Streptomyces scopuliridis produces bacteriocins, desotamides B, desotamides C, desotamides D, sesquiterpenoids and herbicidins.

== See also ==
- List of Streptomyces species
