= Thorsby =

Thorsby may refer to:

- Thorsby, Alabama, a town in the United States
- Thorsby, Alberta, a town in Canada
