= Brylie St. Clair =

American softball player (born 2001)

Personal information
- Born: March 10, 2001 (age 25) Sand Rock, Alabama, U.S.
- Height: 5 ft 5 in (1.65 m)

Sport
- Country: USA
- Sport: Softball
- College team: Mississippi State Bulldogs

Brylie Savanna St. Clair (born March 10, 2001) is an American professional softball player who most recently played for the Texas Monarchs of the Women's Professional Fastpitch (WPF). She played college softball at Mississippi State.

== Early life ==
She attended Sand Rock High School in Sand Rock, Alabama. In 2022, St. Clair was named one of the top 50 female high school athletes in the state of Alabama since the 1972 implementation of Title IX by the Montgomery Advertiser.

== Career ==
St. Clair later attended Mississippi State University, where she played college softball on the Mississippi State Bulldogs softball team. In her junior year, St. Clair led Mississippi State softball to their first ever super regionals berth in the 2022 NCAA Division I softball tournament super regionals, where they lost to Arizona, 2–0. After graduating from Mississippi State, St. Clair went on to play professional softball with the Texas Monarchs of Women's Professional Fastpitch.
