= Cherokee County Schools (Alabama) =

School district in Alabama

Cherokee County School District

Address
- 200 Armory Road Centre, Alabama, 35960; United States

District information
- Grades: K - 12
- Superintendent: Mike Welsh
- Accreditation: AdvancEd
- NCES District ID: 0100630

Students and staff
- Enrollment: 4,049
- Faculty: 596

Other information
- Telephone: (256) 927-3362
- Website: www.cherokeek12.org

Cherokee County Schools is a public school district in Cherokee County, Alabama, United States, based in Centre, Alabama. It serves the communities of Centre, Cedar Bluff, Gaylesville, Leesburg, Sand Rock, Spring Garden, and Broomtown.

== Schools ==
The Cherokee County School District operates eight schools, including four schools that incorporate kindergarten through grade 12 in one building located in the respective namesake towns. The school system located in Centre has a distinct elementary, middle, and high school. The district also has a vocational school where grades 7-12 can learn about career technologies.

== Board of education ==
The Cherokee County Board of Education has five members, elected to six year terms. Members of the Board may not be employees of the Board. The current members of the Board of Education are Superintendent Mike Welsh. Board members consist of Randall Davis, Nathan Ealy, Lisa Chandler, Lisa McKissick, and Corey Colbert.

== K-12 schools ==
- Cedar Bluff School
- Gaylesville School
- Sand Rock School
- Spring Garden School

== Elementary schools ==
- Centre Elementary School

== Middle schools ==
- Centre Middle School

== High schools ==
- Cherokee County High School

== System Programs ==
- Cherokee County Career & Technology Center
