= Cleburne County High School =

Historic school in Alabama, United States

- U.S. National Register of Historic Places
- Location within Alabama
- Location: 911 Willoughby St., Heflin, Alabama
- Coordinates: 33°38′40″N 85°35′08″W
- Built: c.1936
- Website: https://cchs.cleburneschools.net/
- NRHP reference No.: 100002763
- Added to NRHP: August 13, 2018

Cleburne County High School is a public school in Heflin, Alabama, United States, serving students in grades 8 to 12 in Cleburne County, Alabama. It has about 280 students. Old Cleburne County High School is a historic school building listed on the National Register of Historic Places. Tigers are the school mascot and the school colors red and white.

Its football team was established in 1924.

== Old Cleburne County High School ==
The old Cleburne County High School building, also known as Old Cleburne County High School, is at 911 Willoughby St. in Heflin, Alabama. It was listed on the National Register of Historic Places in 2018. It was built around 1936 and served as a school until 1984.

== See also ==
- Cleburne County School District
- List of high schools in Alabama
