= Rashad Johnson =

American football player (born 1986)

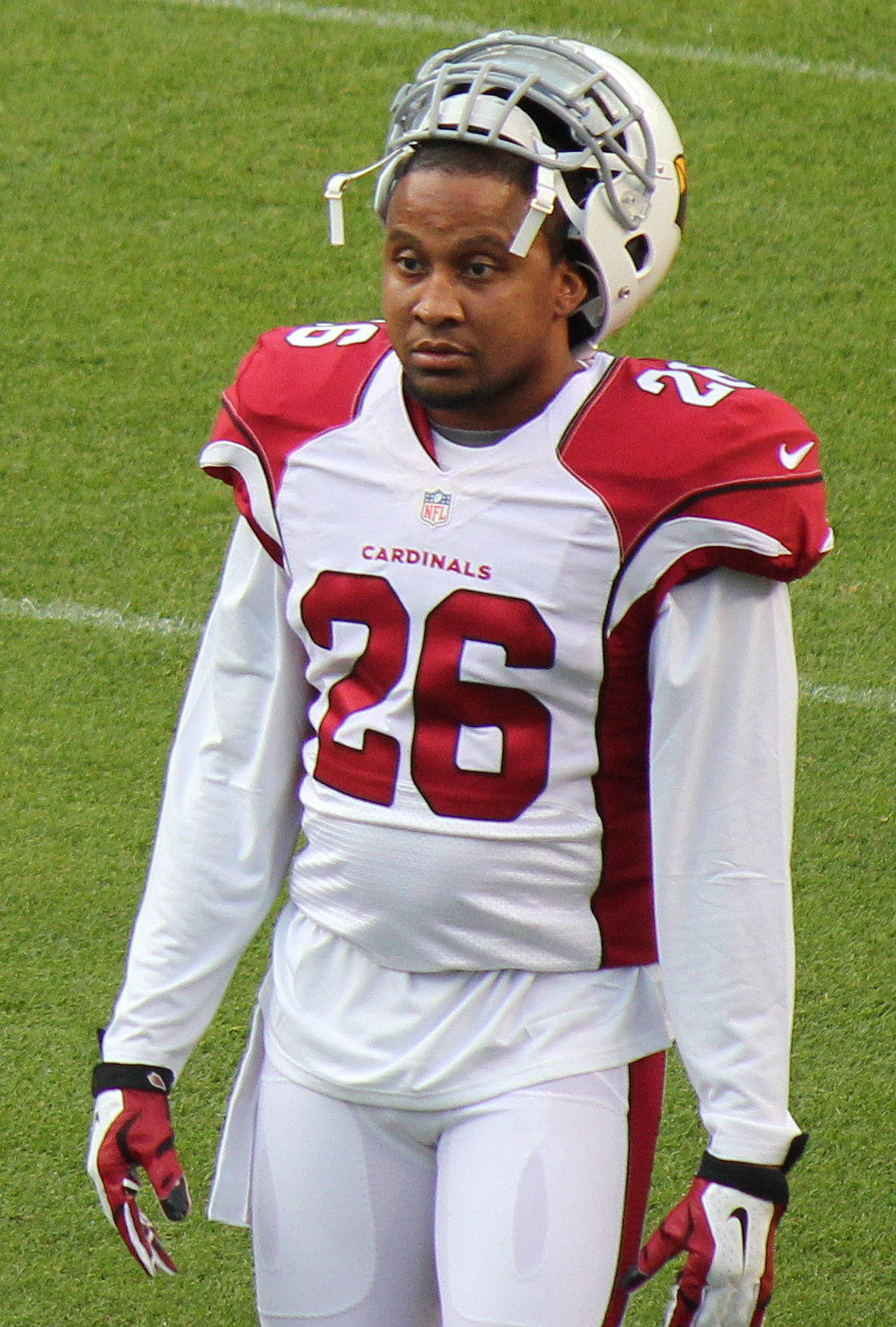
- Johnson with the Arizona Cardinals in 2015

Tampa Bay Buccaneers
- Title: Cornerbacks coach

Personal information
- Born: January 2, 1986 (age 40); Sulligent, Alabama, U.S.
- Listed height: 5 ft 11 in (1.80 m)
- Listed weight: 204 lb (93 kg)

Career information
- Position: Safety (No. 49, 26, 25)
- High school: Sulligent
- College: Alabama
- NFL draft: 2009: 3rd round, 95th overall pick

Career history

Playing
- Arizona Cardinals (2009–2015); Tennessee Titans (2016)

Coaching
- Tampa Bay Buccaneers (2022–present); Defensive assistant (2022); Assistant secondary coach (2023–2025); Cornerbacks coach (2026–present)

Awards and highlights
- First-team All-American (2008); 2× First-team All-SEC (2007, 2008)

Career NFL statistics
- Total tackles: 383
- Quarterback sacks: 1.0
- Forced fumbles: 2
- Fumble recoveries: 4
- Interceptions: 15
- Defensive touchdowns: 3
- Stats at Pro Football Reference

Julian Rashad Johnson (born January 2, 1986) is an American professional football coach and former player who is the cornerbacks coach for the Tampa Bay Buccaneers of the National Football League (NFL). He played safety for eight seasons in the NFL. He played college football for the Alabama Crimson Tide, and was selected in the third round of the 2009 NFL draft by the Arizona Cardinals.

== Early life ==
A native of Sulligent, Alabama, about four miles from the Mississippi state line. The son of Randy and Gloria Johnson attended Sulligent High School and starred in football, basketball and track for the Blue Devils. He graduated ranked fifth in a senior class of only 54 students.

== College career ==
Johnson had no Division I-A college scholarship offers—the largest schools to offer him scholarships were The Citadel and North Alabama. He made an unofficial visit to Alabama and chose to attend Alabama as a walk-on running back. He redshirted in his first year of eligibility, and as a freshman appeared in all 12 games on special teams.

In the spring practice of his sophomore season, he was told by coaches that he'd never be a starting running back there, but they wanted him to switch to defense and play safety. That season (2006), he played in 11 games (missing two due to an ankle injury), starting four at free safety, and earned a full scholarship. He totaled 33 tackles and two forced fumbles. In his junior year in 2007, the now-team captain started all 13 games and led the Tide with 81 tackles and six interceptions. He earned Alabama Co-Defensive Player of the Year honors, was a first-team coaches' All-Southeastern Conference (SEC) selection, and earned UA's 2008 Mal Moore Leadership Award (with center Antoine Caldwell) for his performance during spring practice.

In the 2008 game versus LSU, Johnson had three interceptions (tying an Alabama single-game record), including one that he returned for a touchdown, and one in overtime that helped Alabama win the game and secure the SEC West Division crown. For the season, Johnson was second on the team with 89 tackles and had five interceptions. He was named a unanimous first-team All-SEC and earned first-team All-American honors.

He graduated with a degree in criminal justice.

== Professional career ==
Pre-draft measurables
Height	Weight	Arm length	Hand span	40-yard dash	10-yard split	20-yard split	20-yard shuttle	Three-cone drill	Vertical jump	Broad jump	Bench press
5 ft 11 1/4 in (1.81 m)	203 lb (92 kg)	31 in (0.79 m)	8 3/4 in (0.22 m)	4.60 s	1.62 s	2.69 s	4.23 s	7.09 s	37.0 in (0.94 m)	10 ft 0 in (3.05 m)	15 reps
All values from NFL Combine

=== Arizona Cardinals ===
Johnson was selected by the Arizona Cardinals in the third round (95th overall) of the 2009 NFL draft. As a rookie in 2009, he played in 10 games. In 2010, he played all 16 games with one start, with season totals of 43 tackles and his first career interception. In 2011, he played in 16 games, starting nine of them and totaling 50 tackles.

He became a restricted free agent following the 2010 season, but was re-signed on April 26, 2011. He played in 18 games, starting three, with 20 tackles and two interceptions, one of which was his first touchdown after intercepting Detroit Lions quarterback Matthew Stafford.

On March 12, 2013, Johnson signed a three-year contract to stay with the Cardinals. Before the start of the 2013 season, he switched to jersey number 26 from his original number 49. During a game against the New Orleans Saints on September 22, 2013, he lost his left middle fingertip. He had his first multi-interception game against the Atlanta Falcons, picking off two Matt Ryan passes. In 2013, he started seven of his 13 games and totaled career highs in tackles with 58 and interceptions with three.

A key special teams performer, throughout his first five-season he totaled 41 special teams tackles. In the 2012 season, he racked up 64 yards on two fake punts, picking up first downs after runs of 40 and 24 yards.

=== Tennessee Titans ===
On March 25, 2016, Johnson signed a one-year contract with the Tennessee Titans. Johnson spent one season with the Titans, collecting 38 tackles and one forced fumble.

On January 3, 2018, Johnson announced his retirement from the NFL.

=== Statistics ===
Season	Team	Games	Tackles			Sacks	Interceptions			Other				
Season	Team	Games	Solo	Ast	Total	Sack	Int	Yds	IntTD	DefTD	FFum	FRec	PD	Safety
2009	ARI	10	17	1	18	0.0	0	0	0	0	0	0	1	0
2010	ARI	16	23	13	36	0.0	1	7	0	0	1	0	6	0
2011	ARI	16	34	11	45	0.0	0	0	0	0	0	1	1	0
2012	ARI	15	11	2	53	0.0	2	87	1	0	0	1	2	0
2013	ARI	13	52	6	58	0.0	3	35	0	0	0	0	5	0
2014	ARI	16	82	19	101	1.0	4	146	2	0	0	2	8	0
2015	ARI	14	47	9	56	0.0	5	14	0	0	0	1	7	0
2016	TEN	14	25	13	38	0.0	0	0	0	0	1	0	1	0
Career		114	291	74	382	1.0	15	289	3	0	2	5	31	0

== Post-playing career ==
In 2018, Johnson joined the University of Alabama as the sideline reporter for Alabama's gameday radio team and as a member of the Alabama football staff in an off-field role.

Johnson joined the Tampa Bay Buccaneers in 2022 as a defensive assistant. On February 6, 2026, Johnson was promoted to the role of cornerbacks coach following the firing of Kevin Ross.
