= Chase Whitley =

American baseball player (born 1989)

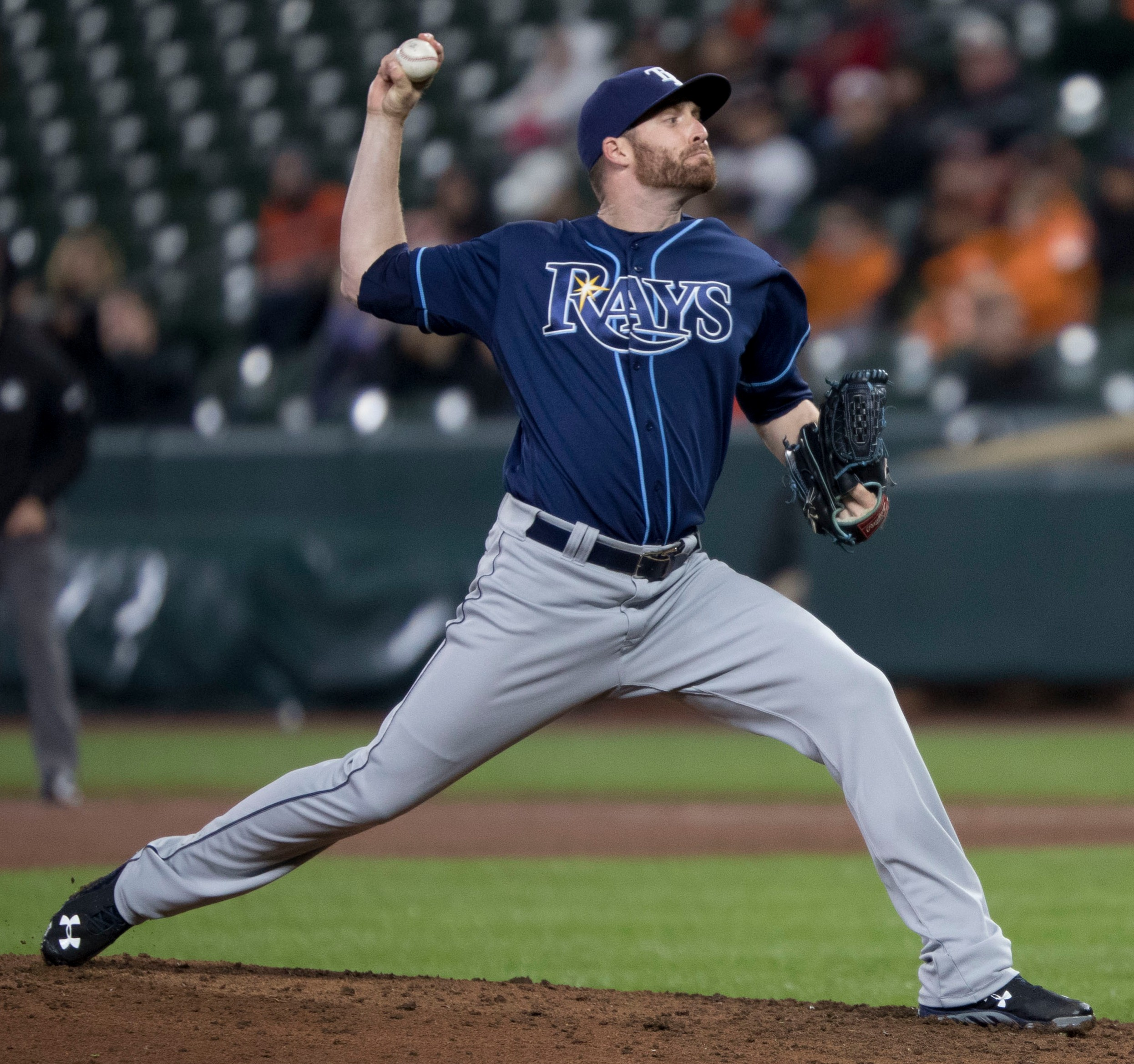
- Whitley with the Tampa Bay Rays
- Pitcher
- Born: June 14, 1989 (age 37); Ranburne, Alabama, U.S.
- Batted: Right Threw: Right

MLB debut
- May 15, 2014, for the New York Yankees

Last MLB appearance
- April 27, 2018, for the Atlanta Braves

MLB statistics
- Win–loss record: 7–6
- Earned run average: 4.56
- Strikeouts: 135
- Stats at Baseball Reference

Teams
- New York Yankees (2014–2015); Tampa Bay Rays (2016–2017); Atlanta Braves (2018)

Chase Coleman Whitley (born June 14, 1989) is an American former professional baseball pitcher. He played for the New York Yankees, Tampa Bay Rays, and Atlanta Braves of Major League Baseball from 2014 through 2018.

== Early life ==
Whitley graduated from Ranburne High School in Ranburne, Alabama, in 2007. He attended Southern Union State Community College, and then transferred to Troy University. The Yankees drafted Whitley out of Troy in the 15th round, with the 475th overall selection, of the 2010 Major League Baseball draft.

== Professional career ==
=== Minor leagues ===
Whitley made his professional debut as a relief pitcher for the Staten Island Yankees of the Class A-Short Season New York–Penn League. Serving as the closer for Staten Island, he had a 1.31 earned run average and 15 saves. He was named an All-Star at midseason. In 2011, Whitley pitched for the Tampa Yankees of the Class A-Advanced Florida State League and the Trenton Thunder of the Class AA Eastern League, recording seven saves in 42 appearances. In 2012, he pitched in middle relief for the Scranton/Wilkes-Barre Yankees of the Class AAA International League. Returning to Scranton/Wilkes-Barre in 2013, Whitley had a 3–2 win–loss record and three saves in 29 appearances, five of which were starts.

After pitching primarily as a reliever, Whitley began working as a starting pitcher in 2014. The Yankees promoted Whitley to make his major league debut on May 15 against cross-town rival New York Mets in Citi Field.

=== New York Yankees (2014–2015) ===
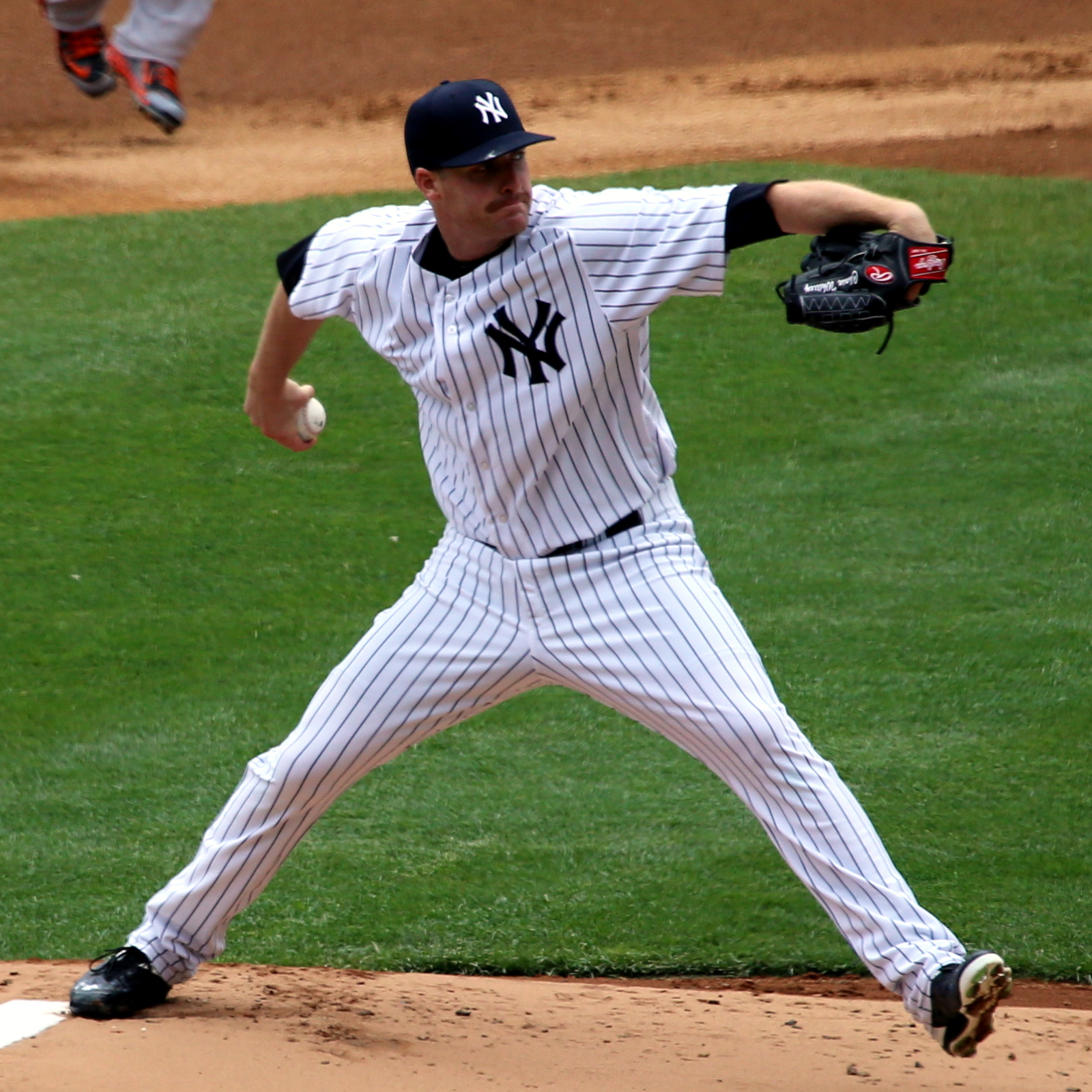
Whitley with the New York Yankees in 2015

On May 15, 2014, the New York Yankees announced that Chase Whitley would make his Major League debut against the New York Mets in the Subway Series. On the mound, he pitched 4.2 innings while issuing 2 hits and 2 walks while striking out 4. At the plate, he recorded his first career hit off of Jacob deGrom, who also got a hit and made his MLB debut in the same game. Whitley took the no-decision as the Yankees would go on to win against the Mets 1–0. It was the first Yankee game since 1908 in which both starting pitchers were making their MLB debut. Whitley surrendered his first major league home run on June 12 to Logan Morrison of the Seattle Mariners. On June 23, 2014 against the Blue Jays, Whitley surrendered 8 runs in 3 1/3 innings pitched, leading to his first MLB loss as the Yankees lost 3–8 to the Blue Jays. In 24 games (12 starts), he finished the year 4–3 with a 5.23 ERA.

Whitley started the 2015 season with Scranton Wilkes/Barre. He was called up on April 27, and made his first start of the season the next day. After pitching through elbow pain, Whitley exited a start on May 14 in the second inning, and was diagnosed with a tear in his ulnar collateral ligament (UCL) in his elbow. Whitley had Tommy John surgery to repair the UCL, and it prematurely ended his 2015 season. In four starts, he went 1–2 with a 4.19 ERA.

=== Tampa Bay Rays (2016–2017) ===
The Tampa Bay Rays claimed Whitley was off of waivers on November 20, 2015. He began the 2016 season on the 60-day disabled list to continue recovering from Tommy John surgery. On August 17, 2016, Whitley was activated from the 60-day disabled list and optioned to the Durham Bulls. During his time with Durham, Whitley recorded a 14.29 ERA in three appearances. Despite his struggles, the Rays added Whitley to the active roster on September 6, 2016. On September 11, 2016, Whitley made his first appearance for the Rays against his former team, the Yankees. In five September outings, Whitley pitched 14.1 innings while surrendering four earned runs.

Whitley started the 2017 season with the Triple-A Durham Bulls. On April 16, the Rays called up Whitley to replace the injured Jake Odorizzi. In his first seven appearances of 2017, Whitley did not allow a run. From mid-April to early August, Whitley pitched 47 innings and struck out 31 while allowing 17 earned runs. After allowing three runs in a relief appearance against the Houston Astros, Whitley was optioned to Triple-A on August 1. He would rejoin the club on August 14 to provide long relief depth in the bullpen.

=== Atlanta Braves (2018) ===
On December 1, 2017, the Atlanta Braves claimed Whitley off waivers. He began the 2018 season on the disabled list after experiencing a staph infection. The Braves optioned Whitley to the Triple-A Gwinnett Stripers on May 1. Whitley declared free agency on October 15, 2018.

== Personal life ==
Whitley has worked at the Excel Baseball Academy in Oxford, Alabama since 2010.

Whitley married Brooklyn Elise Herren in December 2010. They have one son, born in 2015.
