= Ashford, Alabama =

- City
- Seal

- Location of Ashford in Houston County, Alabama.
- Coordinates: 31°11′09″N 85°14′37″W
- Country: United States
- State: Alabama
- County: Houston

Government
  - Type: Mayor-Council
  - Mayor

Area
  - Total: 6.22 sq mi (16.12 km^{2})
  - Land: 6.20 sq mi (16.06 km^{2})
  - Water: 0.023 sq mi (0.06 km^{2})
- Elevation: 246 ft (75 m)

Population (2020)
  - Total: 2,246
  - Density: 362.1/sq mi (139.81/km^{2})
- Time zone: UTC-6 (Central (CST))
  - Summer (DST): UTC-5 (CDT)
- ZIP code: 36312
- Area code: 334
- FIPS code: 01-02836
- GNIS feature ID: 2405172
- Website: www.cityofashford.com

Ashford is a city in Houston County, Alabama, United States. It is part of the Dothan, Alabama Metropolitan Statistical Area. The city was incorporated in June 1891. For most of its history, it was a center for naval stores production, pulpwood harvesting, and cotton agriculture. As of the 2020 census, Ashford had a population of 2,246.

== Geography ==
Ashford is located slightly northeast of the center of Houston County. U.S. Route 84 passes through the southern part of the city, leading west 9 miles (14 km) to Dothan and southeast 24 miles (39 km) to Donalsonville, Georgia. The Chattahoochee River, which forms the Georgia state line, is 12 miles (19 km) southeast of Ashford on US 84.

According to the United States Census Bureau, the city has a total area of 6.3 square miles (16.4 km^{2}), of which 0.02 square miles (0.06 km^{2}), or 0.34%, are water.

== History ==
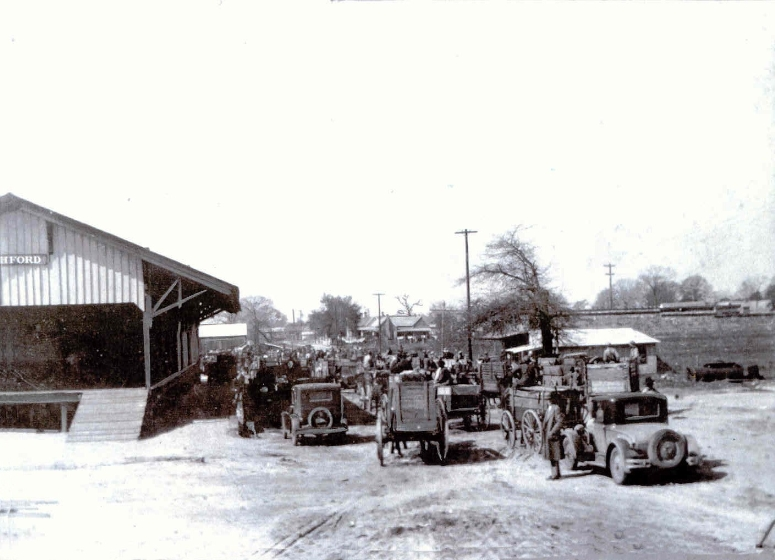
Ashford Depot 1920's

In March 1888, the Alabama Midland Railway built a small depot of Victorian railroad architecture in Ashford to be a waystation along the Bainbridge-to-Montgomery route. The depot was the only building to survive the 1915 fire that destroyed the rest of the city. The original depot received additions at least twice—an enclosed warehouse and open loading dock were added to the east, followed by racially segregated passenger waiting rooms on the west side. The depot faced two sidings that served for loading turpentine from the Adams Company still one block away, and pulpwood. Cotton bales, fertilizer, and a single sweet potato crop were loaded from both sidings.

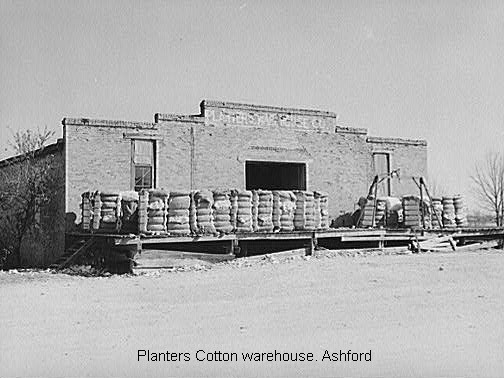
Old Planters Cotton Warehouse 1930's

The depot changed hands as railroads consolidated. The Alabama Midland was absorbed by the Atlantic Coast Line, which merged in the 1980s with the Seaboard Air Line to form the Seaboard Coast Line. CSX Transportation later bought the Seaboard Coast Line. Ashford Depot had fallen into disrepair after it closed in 1978. In the 1980s, concerned citizens founded a preservation committee, led by Jimmy Burgess, and received a grant to add a new roof to the building. This committee also placed the depot on the Alabama Register of Historical Places. It remained active into the 1990s. Former Mayor Bryan Alloway revived the depot preservation committee after his 2000 election. This committee planned to incorporate and seek tax-exempt status in 2005. It received two US Department of Transportation grants ($850,000), two Alabama Department of Economic and Community Affairs grants ($290,000), and one Alabama Resource Conservation & Development (RC&D) grant ($7500) to thoroughly renovate the depot. Construction began in fall 2004. The committee and Ashford City officials held a ribbon-cutting ceremony on November 17, 2005, to mark the end of Phase I of the reconstruction. Now the depot can be used for reunions, birthdays, and social events that the city might sponsor.

On October 10, 2018, Hurricane Michael's western eye wall passed thru the City of Ashford causing major damage and left 100% of the city without power. No injuries or fatalities were associated with the storm.

== Government ==
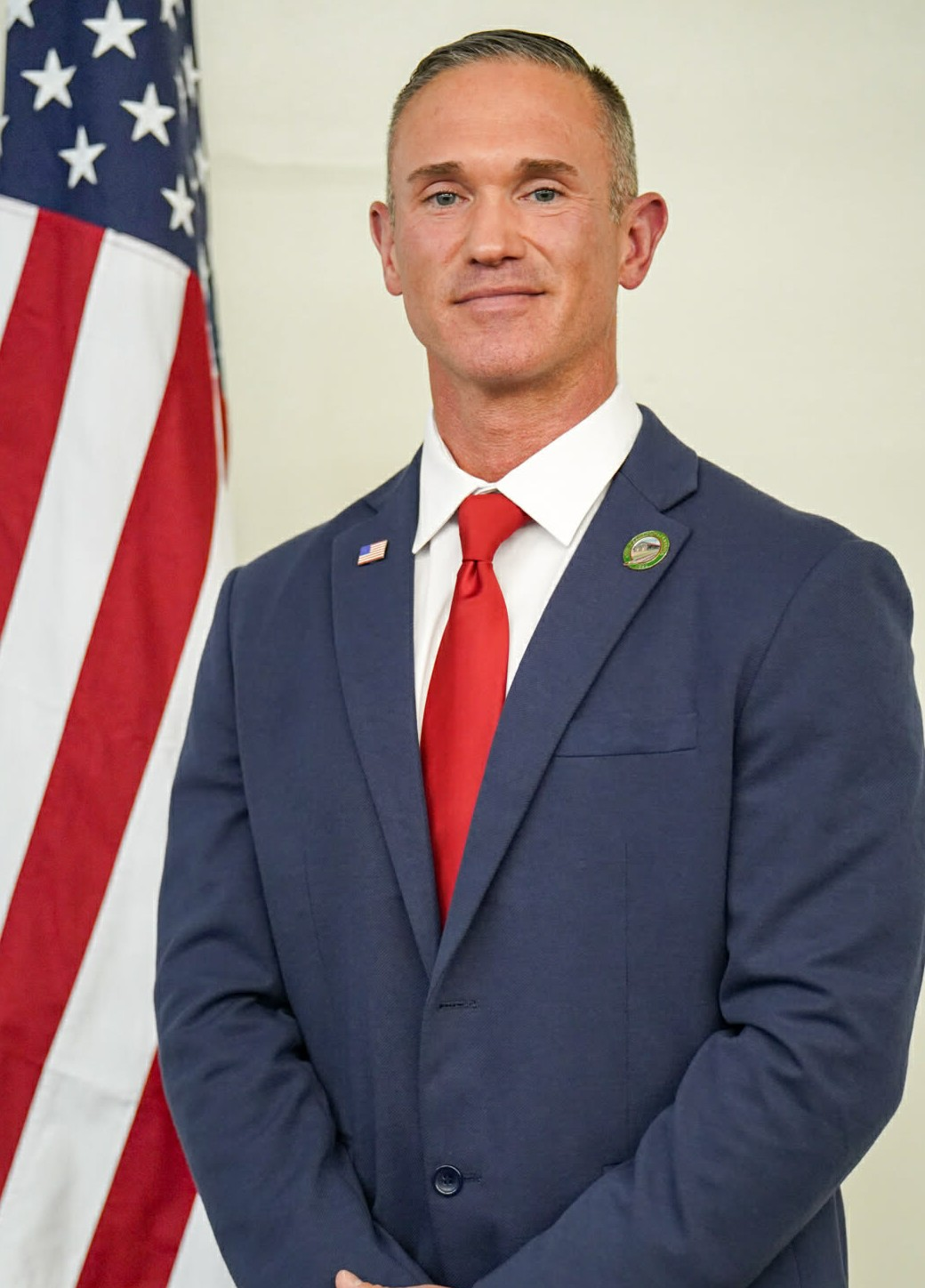
Ashford, Alabama Mayor Blake Rosenkoetter.

The current mayor is Blake Rosenkoetter, and City Council members are Place 1 - Gary Gibson, Place 2 - Joel Waller, Place 3 - Josh Johnson, Place 4 - Brian McCraney, Place 5 - James Edward Smith. The City Clerk is Janet Rumley.

The police chief is Malvin Anderson, who supervises four full-time police officers; the fire chief is Jimmy Posey. The fire department and rescue squad are all volunteers.

The City of Ashford's website is City of Ashford, Official Website

Previous mayors of the City of Ashford: Carole Barfield, Jonathon Grecu, Rusty Burgess, Bryan Alloway

2025 Election (August 26, 2025) :

Mayor - Blake Rosenkoetter 306 votes (70.67%), Carole Barfield 127 votes (29.33%)

Place 1 - Gary Gibson 239 votes (56.5%), Gwen Crittenton 137 vote (32.39%), Jay Lehman 47 votes (11.11%)

Place 2 - Joel Waller 303 votes (70.3%), Ronnie L. Whitehead 128 votes (29.7%)

Place 3 - Josh Johnson 306 votes (73.38%), Bennie Teague 111 vote (26.62%)

Place 4 - Brian McCraney ran unopposed

Place 5 - James Edward Smith 293 votes (71.12%), Zakiya Bolden-Brown 119 votes (28.88%)

== Education ==
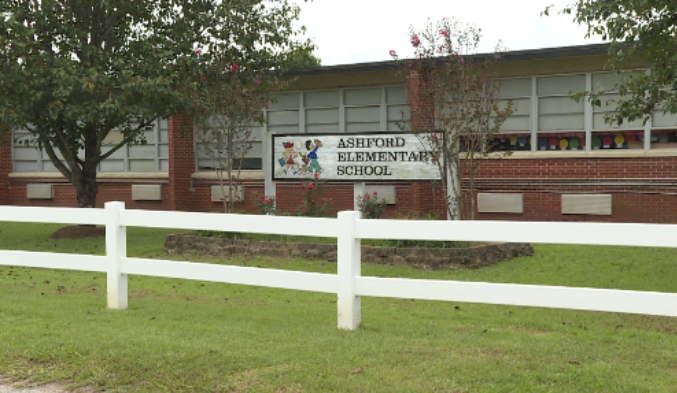
Ashford Elementary School

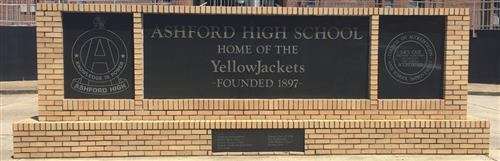
Ashford High School

Ashford schools are part of the Houston County Schools. Ashford has one elementary school for grades K-5 and a high school for grades 6-12. The schools mascot is known as the yellow jackets named Buzz. The current principal of Ashford Elementary School is Sharon LeRoy and the principal of Ashford High School is Dr. Donnie Chambers.

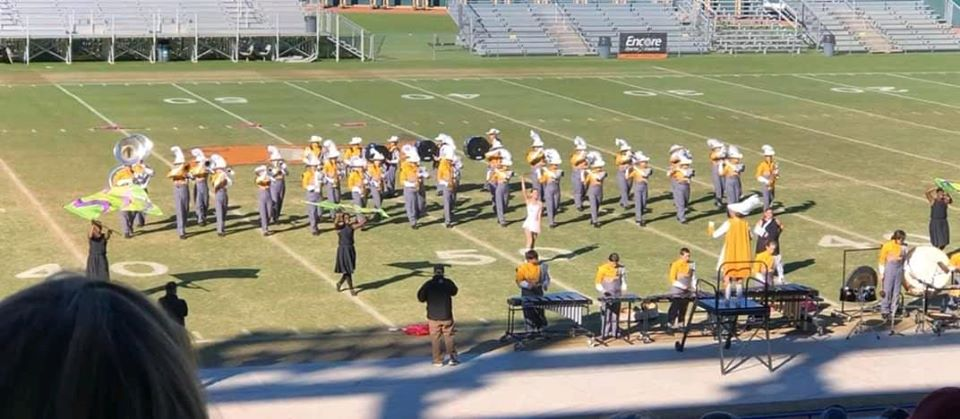
2019 Ashford High School Band at the 2019 Alabama State High School Marching Band Championships

Ashford Academy was once a private school that closed its doors at the end of the 2014–2015 school year.

== Recreation ==
The City of Ashford offers recreation activities throughout the year, including baseball, softball, soccer, and basketball. Football and cheerleading is organized through the Ashford Youth Sports Association. The recreation ball fields are located behind Ashford High School on 8th Avenue. The recreation park includes T-Ball, softball, and baseball fields. Basketball is played at Watermark Church of Ashford. In 2015, Ashford hosted the 2015 Alabama State Class "A" Baseball Tournament. In 2021, the Ashford recreation boys 8u all-star team won the state championship in Tuscaloosa, Alabama, and then went on to Laurel, Mississippi to play in the 2021 Dixie Youth World Series where they finished 3rd in the class AA division.

== Demographics ==
Historical population
Census	Pop.	Note	%±
1900	286		—
1910	479		67.5%
1920	754		57.4%
1930	920		22.0%
1940	1,224		33.0%
1950	1,400		14.4%
1960	1,511		7.9%
1970	1,980		31.0%
1980	2,165		9.3%
1990	1,926		−11.0%
2000	1,853		−3.8%
2010	2,148		15.9%
2020	2,246		4.6%
U.S. Decennial Census

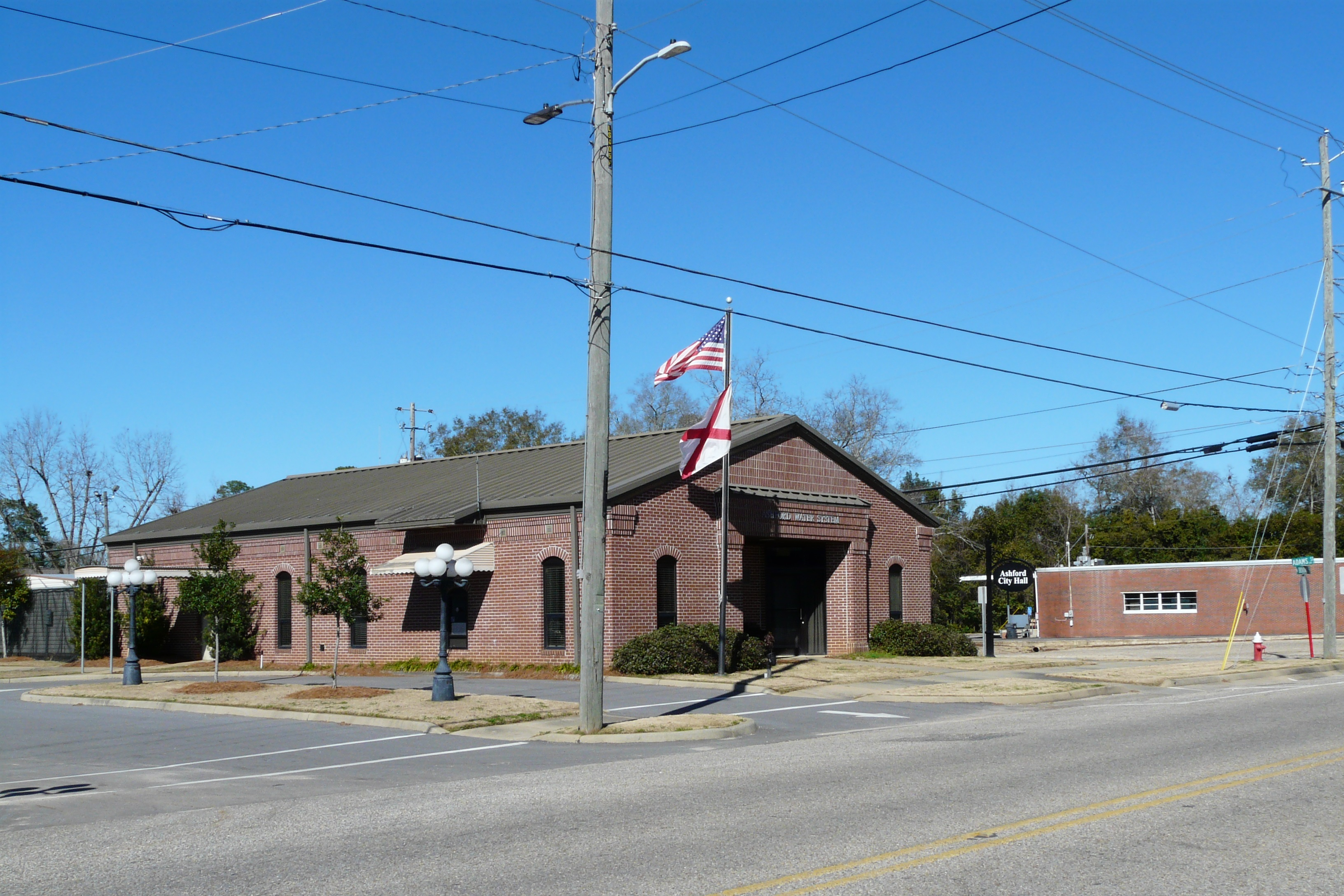
City Hall

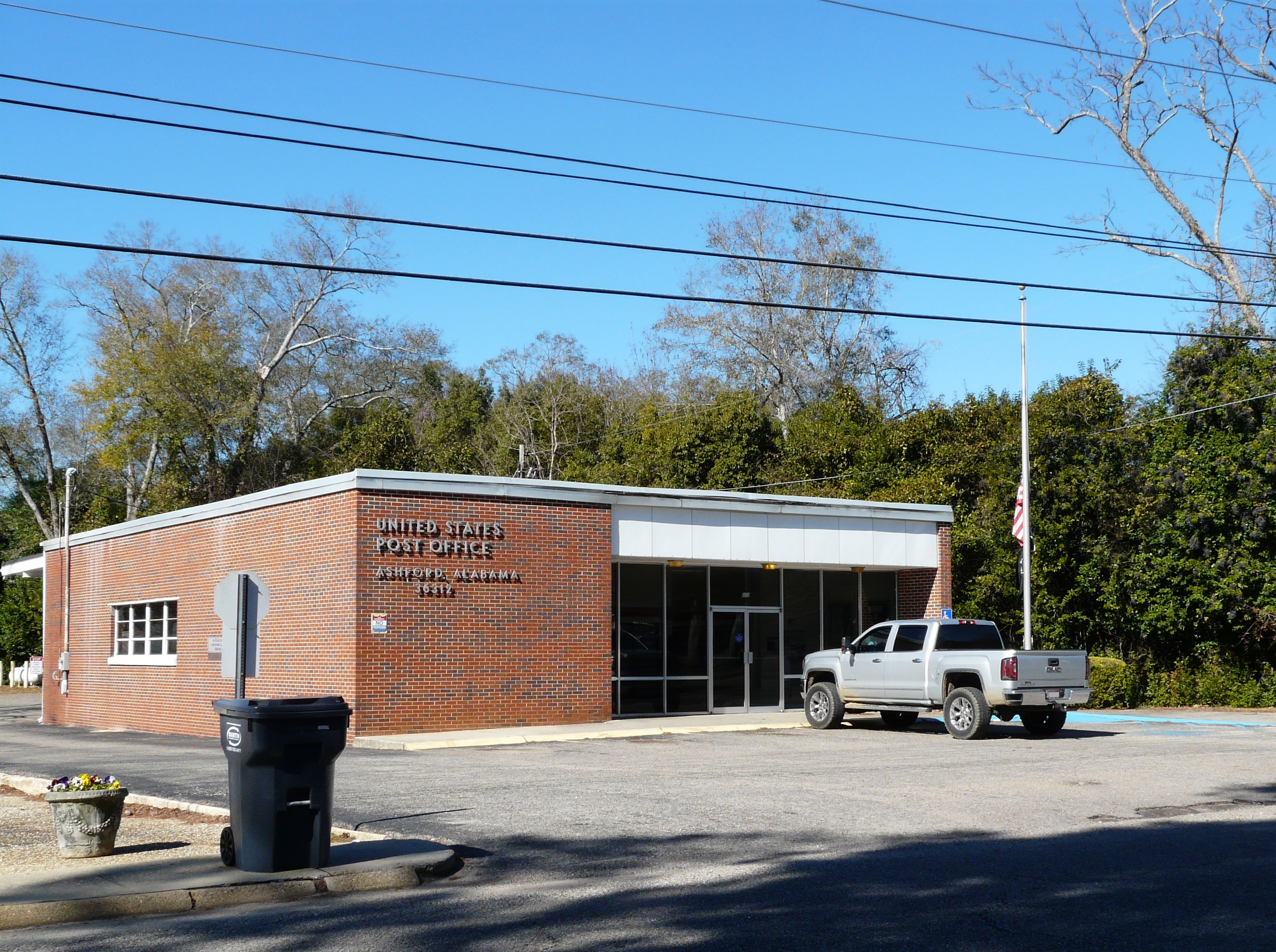
Ashford Post Office

=== City of Ashford ===
Ashford first appeared on the 1900 U.S. Census as an incorporated town, then in Henry County. In 1903, Ashford was shifted into the new county of Houston. See also Ashford Precinct below. After Ashford exceeded a population of 2,000, it transitioned to take the name City of Ashford.

=== Racial and ethnic composition ===
Ashford town, Alabama – Racial and ethnic composition Note: the US Census treats Hispanic/Latino as an ethnic category. This table excludes Latinos from the racial categories and assigns them to a separate category. Hispanics/Latinos may be of any race.
Race / Ethnicity (NH = Non-Hispanic)	Pop 1990	Pop 2000	Pop 2010	Pop 2020	% 1990	% 2000	% 2010	% 2020
White alone (NH)	1,281	1,314	1,689	1,646	66.51%	70.91%	78.63%	73.29%
Black or African American alone (NH)	624	496	418	458	32.40%	26.77%	19.46%	20.39%
Native American or Alaska Native alone (NH)	15	12	4	10	0.78%	0.65%	0.19%	0.45%
Asian alone (NH)	1	1	5	6	0.05%	0.05%	0.23%	0.27%
Native Hawaiian or Pacific Islander alone (NH)	x	0	0	1	x	0.00%	0.00%	0.04%
Other race alone (NH)	0	0	0	6	0.00%	0.00%	0.00%	0.27%
Mixed race or Multiracial (NH)	x	2	15	81	x	0.11%	0.70%	3.61%
Hispanic or Latino (any race)	5	28	17	38	0.26%	1.51%	0.79%	1.69%
Total	1,926	1,853	2,148	2,246	100.00%	100.00%	100.00%	100.00%

=== 2020 census ===
As of the 2020 census, there were 2,246 people, 930 households, and 635 families residing in the town.

The median age was 41.8 years. 23.2% of residents were under the age of 18 and 18.6% of residents were 65 years of age or older. For every 100 females there were 93.5 males, and for every 100 females age 18 and over there were 86.9 males age 18 and over.

0.0% of residents lived in urban areas, while 100.0% lived in rural areas.

Of Ashford households, 35.5% had children under the age of 18 living in them. Of all households, 44.6% were married-couple households, 17.8% were households with a male householder and no spouse or partner present, and 31.6% were households with a female householder and no spouse or partner present. About 26.0% of all households were made up of individuals, and 13.9% had someone living alone who was 65 years of age or older.

There were 1,004 housing units, of which 7.4% were vacant. The homeowner vacancy rate was 1.2% and the rental vacancy rate was 1.3%.

Historical population
Census	Pop.	Note	%±
1900	1,521		—
1910	1,837		20.8%
1920	2,266		23.4%
1930	2,425		7.0%
1940	2,529		4.3%
1950	2,605		3.0%
1960	4,607		76.9%
1970	4,769		3.5%
2020	2,246		—
U.S. Decennial Census

=== 2010 census ===
As of the census of 2010, there were 2,148 people, 867 households, and 623 families residing in the city. The population density was 352.1 inhabitants per square mile (135.9/km^{2}). There were 1,004 housing units at an average density of 164.6 per square mile (63.6/km^{2}). The racial makeup of the city was 79.0% White, 19.5% Black or African American, 0.2% Native American, 0.2% Asian, and 0.7% from two or more races. .8% of the population were Hispanic or Latino of any race.

There were 867 households, out of which 27.8% had children under the age of 18 living with them, 51.6% were married couples living together, 14.4% had a female householder with no husband present, and 28.1% were non-families. 24.8% of all households were made up of individuals, and 13.3% had someone living alone who was 65 years of age or older. The average household size was 2.48 and the average family size was 2.94.

In the city the population was spread out, with 23.7% under the age of 18, 9.0% from 18 to 24, 21.7% from 25 to 44, 28.2% from 45 to 64, and 17.4% who were 65 years of age or older. The median age was 41.2 years. For every 100 females, there were 91.1 males. For every 100 females age 18 and over, there were 94.0 males.

The median income for a household in the city was $35,709, and the median income for a family was $55,833. Males had a median income of $38,654 versus $27,143 for females. The per capita income for the city was $21,444. About 9.1% of families and 14.3% of the population were below the poverty line, including 21.5% of those under age 18 and 15.5% of those age 65 or over.

=== 2000 census ===
As of the census of 2000, there were 1,853 people, 763 households, and 527 families residing in the city. The population density was 303.9 inhabitants per square mile (117.3/km^{2}). There were 877 housing units at an average density of 143.8 per square mile (55.5/km^{2}). The racial makeup of the city was 71.45% White, 27.52% Black or African American, 0.70% Native American, 0.05% Asian, and 0.27% from two or more races. 1.51% of the population were Hispanic or Latino of any race.

There were 763 households, out of which 30.1% had children under the age of 18 living with them, 52.3% were married couples living together, 14.0% had a female householder with no husband present, and 30.9% were non-families. 29.0% of all households were made up of individuals, and 16.8% had someone living alone who was 65 years of age or older. The average household size was 2.43 and the average family size was 2.99.

In the city the population was spread out, with 25.1% under the age of 18, 7.1% from 18 to 24, 26.2% from 25 to 44, 24.2% from 45 to 64, and 17.4% who were 65 years of age or older. The median age was 39 years. For every 100 females, there were 83.5 males. For every 100 females age 18 and over, there were 76.8 males.

The median income for a household in the city was $29,444, and the median income for a family was $40,313. Males had a median income of $30,167 versus $22,286 for females. The per capita income for the city was $15,135. About 11.3% of families and 16.9% of the population were below the poverty line, including 18.5% of those under age 18 and 27.7% of those age 65 or over.

== Ashford Precinct/Division (1900-70) ==
Ashford Precinct was first created in 1900, then as the 19th precinct of Henry County. In 1903, Ashford was shifted into the new county of Houston and its precinct was renumbered the 10th. In 1960, it was reorganized into a census division. In 1980, the Ashford Census Division was merged into the Dothan Census Division.

== Notable person ==
- Robert Stewart, former Arena Football League player
