= Horseshoe Bend National Military Park =

2,040-acre park in Alabama (US) maintained by the National Park Service

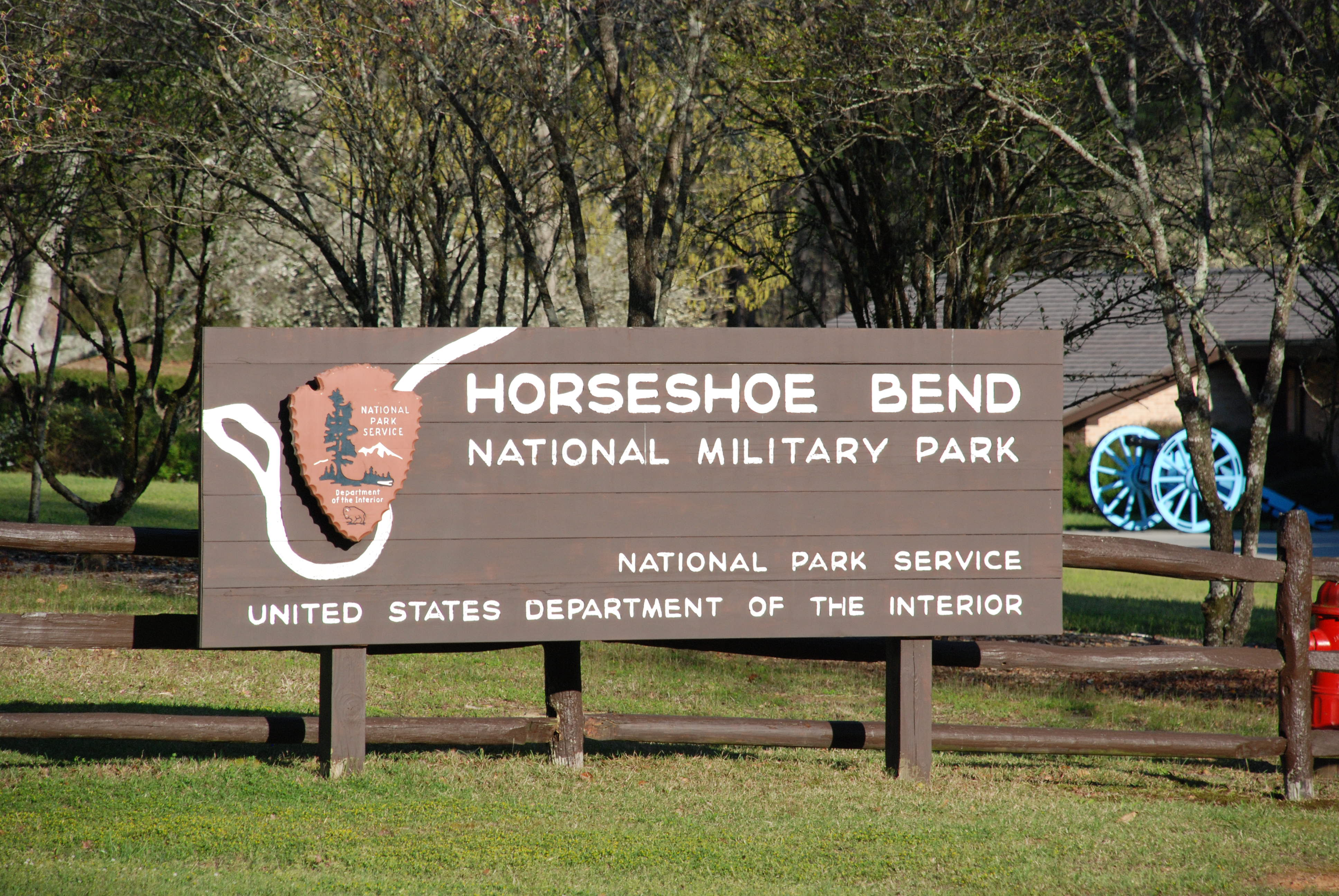

- Location within Alabama Location within the United States
- Location: Tallapoosa County, Alabama, U.S.
- Nearest city: New Site, Alabama
- Coordinates: 32°58′15″N 85°44′18″W
- Area: 2,040 acres (8.3 km^{2})
- Established: July 25, 1956
- Visitors: 28,600 (in 2020)
- Governing body: National Park Service
- Website: Horseshoe Bend National Historic Park
- Horseshoe Bend National Military Park
- U.S. National Register of Historic Places
- U.S. Historic district
- Built: 1813
- NRHP reference No.: 66000060
- Added to NRHP: October 15, 1966

Horseshoe Bend National Military Park is a 2,040-acre, U.S. national military park managed by the National Park Service that is the site of the penultimate battle of the Creek War on March 27, 1814.

The military park is located in Tallapoosa County, Alabama. Although New Site is the closest municipality, the park uses a mailing address based in Daviston.

General Andrew Jackson's Tennessee militia, aided by the 39th U.S. Infantry Regiment and Cherokee and Lower Creek allies, won a decisive victory against the Upper Creek Red Stick Nation during the Battle of Horseshoe Bend at this site on the Tallapoosa River. Jackson's decisive victory at Horseshoe Bend broke the power of the Creek Nation.

Over 800 Upper Creeks died defending their homeland. This was the largest loss of life for Native Americans in a single battle in the history of United States.

On August 9, 1814, the Creeks signed the Treaty of Fort Jackson, which ceded 23 million acres (93,000 km^{2}) of land in Alabama and Georgia to the United States government.

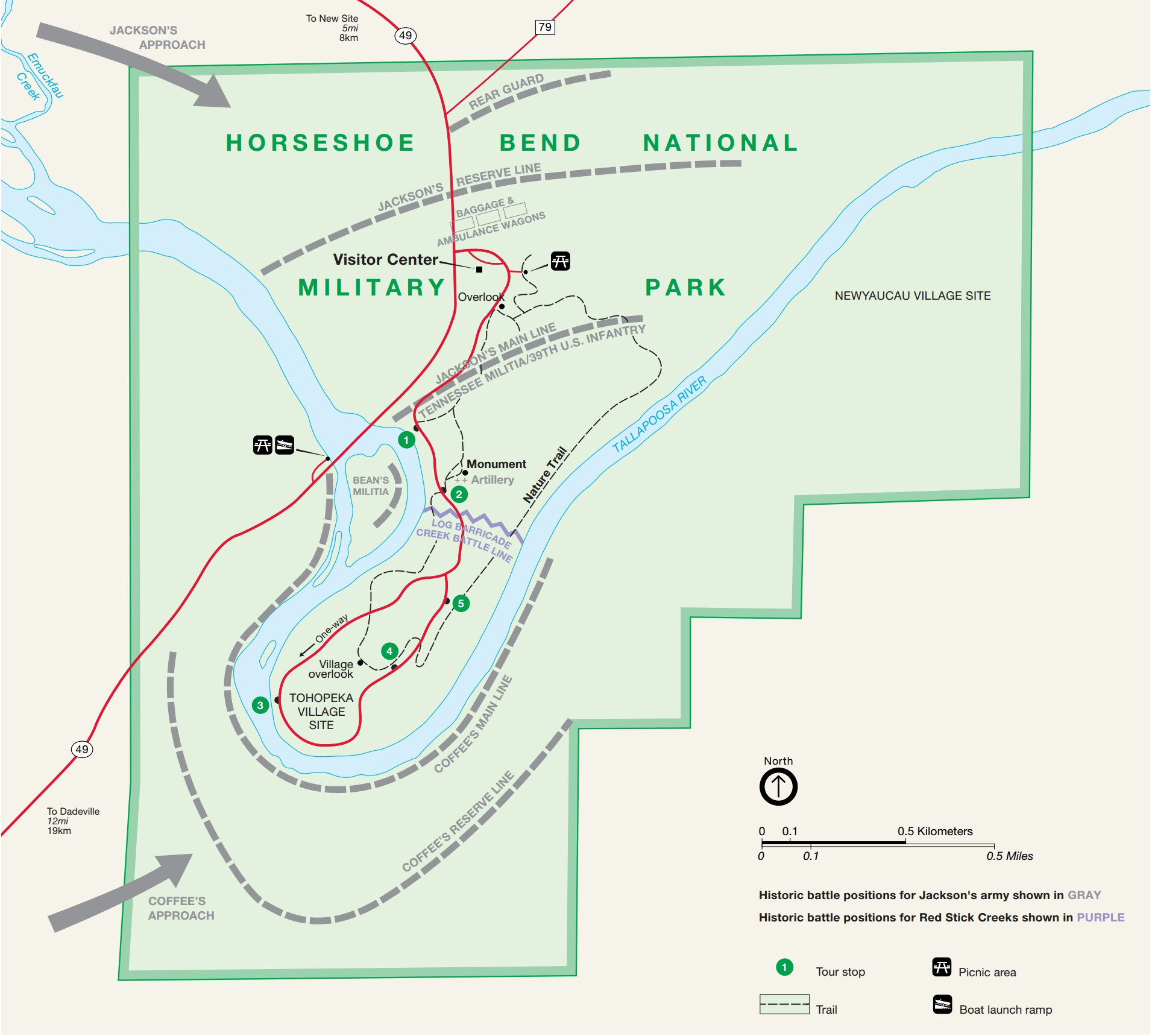
Map of Horseshoe Bend
