= Cleburne County School District =

School district in Alabama, United States

Address
- 141 Davenport Dr Heflin, Alabama, 36264; United States
- Coordinates: 33°37′34″N 85°31′12″W

District information
- Motto: Create and Maintain Unity and Success System Wide
- Established: 1867 (159 years ago)
- Superintendent: Chad young
- Enrollment: 2,600 (2017–2018)

Other information
- Website: www.cleburneschools.net

Cleburne County School District is a school district in Cleburne County, Alabama, United States.

A survey report on the county's schools was published in 1932.

== List of schools ==
=== Elementary schools ===
- Cleburne County Elementary School
- Fruithurst Elementary School
- Pleasant Grove Elementary School
- Ranburne Elementary School

=== Middle schools ===
- Cleburne County Middle School

=== High schools ===
- Cleburne County Career Technical School
- Cleburne County High School
- Ranburne High School

== Ranburne High School ==
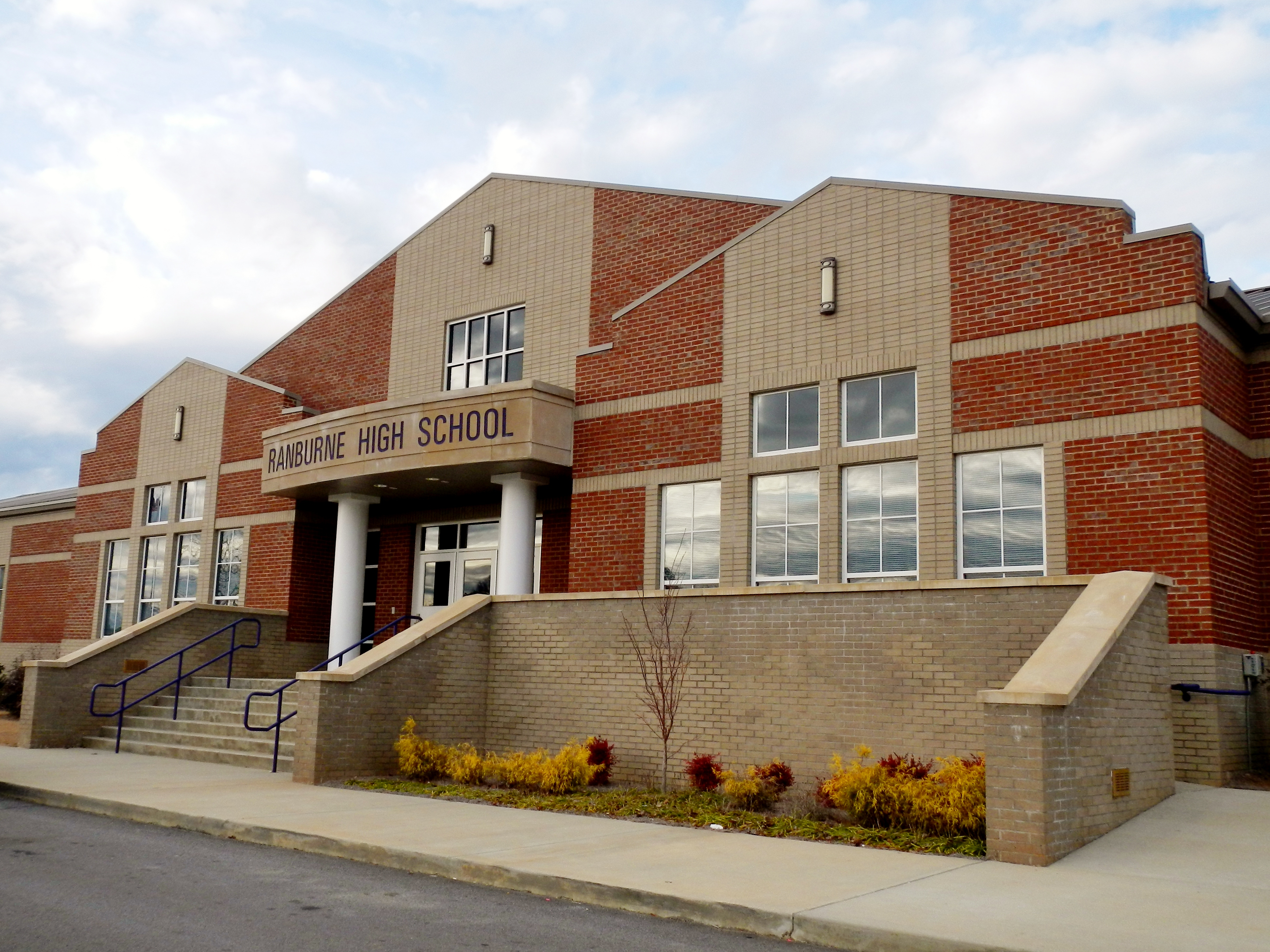
Ranburne High School

Ranburne High School is a public high school in Ranburne, Alabama serving students in Cleburne County, Alabama. It is part of the Cleburne County School District. The school has about 225 students. The school's teams compete as the Bulldogs and the school colors are purple and gray. Chase Whitley is an alumnus.

The school's football team was established in 1931. It went 0–5 in 1948 and did not score any points. In 1976 the team won the 1A state football championship.

The student body is mostly white.

== See also ==
- List of high schools in Alabama
