= Dallas County Schools (Alabama) =

School district in Alabama

Dallas County Schools is a school district headquartered in Selma, Alabama, United States. The district serves unincorporated areas in Dallas County, Alabama and most municipalities; residents of the City of Selma are zoned to Selma City Schools.

== Schools ==
=== Middle and high schools ===
- Keith Middle-High School (Unincorporated area)

=== High schools ===
- Dallas County High School (Unincorporated area)
- Southside High School (Unincorporated area)

=== Middle schools ===
- Martin Middle School (Valley Grande)
- Tipton Middle School (Unincorporated area)

=== Elementary schools ===
K-6

- Brantley Elementary School (Unincorporated area)
- Shiloh Elementary School (Unincorporated area)
- J. E. Terry Elementary (Unincorporated area)
- Valley Grande Elementary (Valley Grande)

3-6

- Five Points Elementary School (Unincorporated area)

3-5

- Bruce K. Craig Elementary School (Unincorporated area)

K-2

- Salem Primary School (Unincorporated area)
- Southside Primary School (Unincorporated area)

=== Other ===
- Career Tech Center (Unincorporated area)

== Failing schools ==
Statewide testing ranks the schools in Alabama. Those in the bottom six percent are listed as "failing." As of early 2018, three local schools were included in this category.

- Keith Middle-High School
- Southside High School
- Tipton Durant Middle School
