= Sulligent High School =

School in Alabama

Location
- 661 Elm Street; Sulligent, Alabama 35586; United States
- Coordinates: 33°53′56″N 88°07′50″W

Information
- Type: Public
- School district: Lamar County School District
- CEEB code: 012540
- Principal: Tommy Chism
- Staff: 39.50 (on an FTE basis)
- Grades: PK-12
- Enrollment: 714 (2022–23)
- Student to teacher ratio: 18.08
- Colors: Blue and White
- Athletics: AHSAA Class 2A
- Team name: Sulligent Blue Devils
- Rival: Lamar County High School
- Website: lamarcountyk12.com/en-US/sulligent-72778dc2

Sulligent High School is in Sulligent, Alabama and serves students in Lamar County, Alabama. It is part of the Lamar County School District. It is a rural school in northwestern Alabama.

The student body is predominantly white.

== History ==
Sulligent School was chartered in 1890. The Sulligent School building burnt in 1908. The cornerstone for the new Sulligent High School was laid in 1909. In 1930, a new building for the high school was built. It burned, in 1978.

African American students in Lamar County attended Lamar County Training School which became Todd High School until integration.

In 2010, the school made national headlines after a coach was arrested for child molestation. He was sentenced to 35 years in prison. In 2017, the school was sued after a student was strip-searched twice on suspicion of smoking marijuana.

== Athletics ==
Blue Devils are the school mascot. The school colors are blue and white. The school has never won a state football championship. It is 0-1 in the finals. Sulligent High School is in Division 2A. Its football team made it to the AGSAA football state semifinals in 2024 losing to Tuscaloosa Academy who they beat in double overtime earlier in the season.

The girls basketball team won state championships.

== Notable alumni ==
- Joe Cribbs, former NFL and USFL player
- Rashad Johnson, former NFL player
- John Sullins, former NFL player
- Joseph E. Woods, decorated U.S. military serviceman

== See also ==
- List of high schools in Alabama
