= Franklin County School District (Georgia) =

School district in Georgia (U.S. state)

Address
- 280 Busha Rd. Carnesville, Franklin, Georgia, 30521-6919; United States
- Coordinates: 34.381182°N 83.225855°W

District information
- Grades: PK–12
- Superintendent: Christopher Forrer
- Accreditation(s): Southern Association of Colleges and Schools; Georgia Accrediting Commission
- NCES District ID: 1302250

Students and staff
- Enrollment: 3,555 (2020–21)
- Faculty: 225.3 (FTE)

Other information
- Telephone: (706) 384-4554
- Fax: (706) 384-7472
- Website: www.franklin.k12.ga.us

The Franklin County School District is a public school district in Franklin County, Georgia, United States, based in Carnesville. It serves the communities of Canon, Carnesville, Franklin Springs, Gumlog, Lavonia, Martin, and Royston.

== Schools ==
The Franklin County School District has three elementary schools, one middle school, and one high school.

=== Elementary schools ===
- Carnesville Elementary School
- Lavonia Elementary School
- South Franklin Elementary School

=== Middle school ===
- Franklin County Middle School

=== High school ===
- Franklin County High School
