= Dale County School District =

School district in Alabama

Dale County School District, also known as Dale County Board of Education (DCBE), is a school district in Dale County, Alabama. It is headquartered in Ozark.

Most areas in the county are zoned to Dale County School District. However four municipalities have their own school districts: Daleville City School District, Dothan City School District, Enterprise City School District, and Ozark City School District. Additionally residents of Fort Novosel are assigned to schools operated by the Department of Defense Education Activity (DoDEA), for elementary levels, while on-post Fort Rucker families may attend Daleville, Enterprise, or Ozark schools at the secondary level.

== Schools ==
- Dale County High School
- George W. Long High School
- Ariton School
- South Dale Middle School
- George W. Long Elementary School
- Midland City Elementary School
- Newton Elementary School
