= Tallapoosa County Schools =

School district in Alabama, United States

Tallapoosa County Schools is a school district in Tallapoosa County, Alabama, headquartered in Dadeville.

== Schools ==
- Dadeville High School
- Edward Bell Career Tech Center
- Reeltown High School
- Horseshoe Bend School
- Dadeville Elementary School
- Reeltown Elementary School
