= Talladega City School District =

School district in Alabama, United States

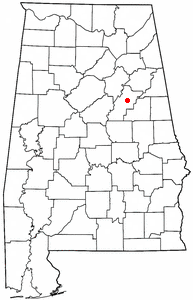
- Talladega, Alabama

Location
- Talladega, Alabama United States

District information
- Type: Public
- Motto: "A Better Tomorrow Begins By Pursuing Excellence Today"
- Grades: PK–12
- Superintendent: Dr. Quentin J. Lee
- Asst. superintendent(s): Daphne Morris
- Schools: 5
- Budget: $23.93 million

Students and staff
- Students: 2,056
- Teachers: 120

Other information
- Website: https://www.talladega-cs.net/

Talladega City Schools is a public school district located in Talladega County, Alabama. The district operates five schools and serves approximately 2,056 students with 120 teachers. The district includes three elementary schools, one high school, and one technical school.

== Administration ==
The district is managed by an administrative team responsible for daily operations, policy implementation, and fiscal oversight. Superintendent Dr. Quentin J. Lee leads the executive team alongside Executive Assistant Daphne Morris. In addition, the district’s Board of Education—composed of five elected members—is responsible for establishing policies, approving the budget, and providing oversight. Board meeting agendas and minutes are available on the district’s website.

== Academics ==
Talladega City Schools offers educational programs from pre-kindergarten through 12th grade. The curriculum covers standard academic subjects and includes specialized programs in areas such as science, technology, engineering, mathematics (STEM), and the humanities.

== Budget ==
For the 2024–2025 school year, the operating budget was $23,930,530.37. This funding supports instructional expenses, facility maintenance, technology, and extracurricular programs across the district's five schools.

== Schools ==
The district operates the following institutions:

- Young Elementary
- Houston Elementary
- Salter Elementary
- Talladega High School
- Talladega Career/Technical Center
