= Butler County Schools =

School district in Alabama, United States

Address
- 211 School Highlands Road Greenville, Alabama, 36037; United States
- Coordinates: 31.8153°N 86.6288°W

District information
- Type: Public
- Grades: PK–12
- Schools: 7
- NCES District ID: 0100510

Students and staff
- Students: 2,699 (2025–2026)
- Teachers: 151.30 (on an FTE basis) (2025–2026)
- Staff: 158.88 (on an FTE basis) (2025–2026)
- Student–teacher ratio: 17.84 (2025–2026)

Other information
- Website: www.butlerco.k12.al.us

Butler County School District is a school district in Butler County, Alabama, United States. The school district oversees a total of six schools. The schools are Georgiana School, Greenville Elementary, Greenville Middle, Greenville High, McKenzie, and W. O. Parmer Elementary.
