= Horseshoe Bend High School =

Coordinates: 33°0′51.15″N 85°48′15.04″W

Location
- 10684 Highway 22 E New Site, Alabama 36256; United States

Information
- Type: Public
- CEEB code: 010050
- Principal: Brent Waites
- Grades: Pre-K-12
- Enrollment: 788 (2023-2024)
- Colors: Red, white, and Columbia blue
- Mascot: Generals
- Website: www.tallapoosak12.org/Domain/10

Horseshoe Bend High School is a high school in New Site, Alabama.
