= Talladega County Schools =

School district in Alabama

Location
- Talladega County, Alabama United States

District information
- Type: Public
- Motto: '#LeadingTheWay'
- Grades: PK-12
- Superintendent: Dr. Suzanne Lacey
- Schools: 18
- Budget: $82.2 million
- NCES District ID: 0103180

Students and staff
- Students: 7,398
- Teachers: 410
- Staff: 355

Other information
- Website: http://www.tcboe.org/

Talladega County Schools is the school district of Talladega County, Alabama. Talladega County Schools serve 7,398 students and employ 765 faculty and staff. The district includes seven elementary schools, three middle schools, seven high schools (two of which are K-12), and one alternative school.

== Schools ==
The Talladega County School District consists of 18 schools across 7 cities in Talladega County.

Childersburg, Alabama:

- AH Watwood Elementary School (PK-4)
- Childersburg Elementary School (PK-4)
- Childersburg Middle School (5-8)
- Childersburg High School (9-12)

Sylacauga, Alabama:

- BB Comer Memorial Elementary School (PK-6)
- BB Comer Memorial High School (7-12)
- Fayetteville High School (K-12)

Lincoln, Alabama:

- Lincoln Elementary School (PK-5)
- Charles R Drew Middle School (6-8)
- Lincoln High School (9-12)

Munford, Alabama:

- Munford Elementary School (PK-5)
- Munford Middle School (6-8)
- Munford High School (9-12)

near Talladega:

- Stemley Road Elementary School (PK-6)

Alpine, Alabama:

- Winterboro High School (5-12)
- Genesis Alternative School (N/A)

Sycamore, Alabama:

- Sycamore Elementary School (K-4)
