= Winston County Schools =

School district in Alabama, United States

Coordinates: 34°8′57″N 87°24′13″W

The Winston County School System consists of the public schools serving Winston County, Alabama.

Joey Boteler is the president of the school board through 2029.

== Member schools ==
- Addison Elementary
- Addison High School
- Double Springs Elementary
- Double Springs Middle
- Lynn Elementary
- Lynn High School
- Meek Elementary
- Meek High School
- Winston County High School
- Winston County Technical Center
