= Selma City Schools =

School district in Alabama, United States

Selma City Schools is a school district - for public schools - headquartered in Selma, Alabama, United States. It serves the entire city.

== Schools ==
=== High schools ===
- Selma High School

=== Middle schools ===
- R.B. Hudson Middle School (7th and 8th Grades)
- School of Discovery (6th Grade)

=== Elementary schools ===
- Byrd Elementary School
- Cedar Park Elementary School
- Clark Elementary School
- Edgewood Elementary School
- Sophia P. Kingston Elementary School
- Knox Elementary School
- Meadowview Elementary School
- Payne Elementary School

== Failing schools ==
Statewide testing ranks the schools in Alabama. Those in the bottom six percent are listed as "failing." As of early 2018, both Selma High School and R.B.Hudson Middle School were included in this category.

== See also ==
- John T. Morgan Academy, a private school in Selma City.
