= Arley, Alabama =

- Town
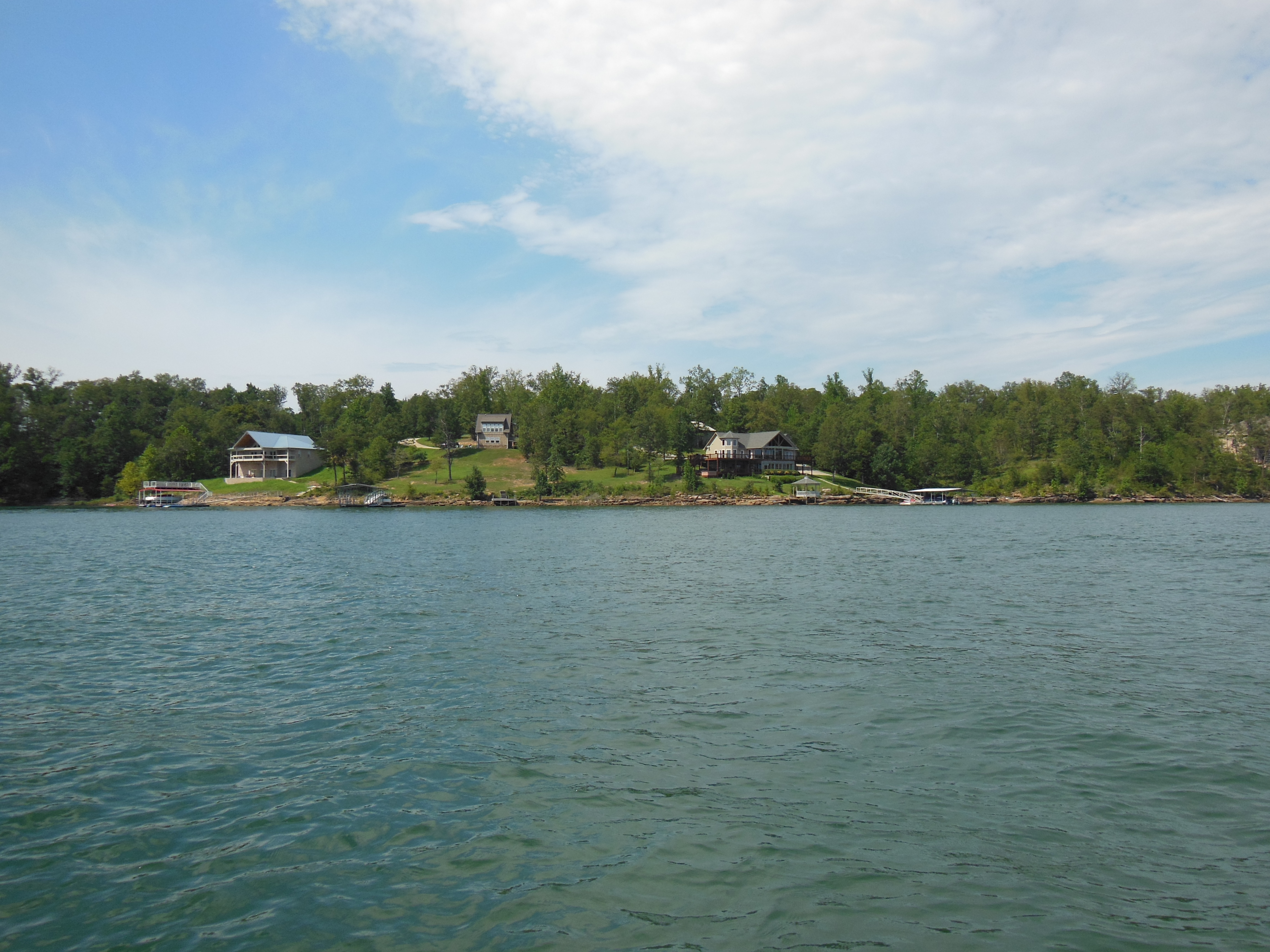
- Homes on Lewis Smith Lake near Arley

- Location of Arley in Winston County, Alabama.
- Coordinates: 34°04′32″N 87°13′04″W
- Country: United States
- State: Alabama
- County: Winston

Government
  - Type: Mayor-Council

Area
  - Total: 3.77 sq mi (9.77 km^{2})
  - Land: 3.76 sq mi (9.74 km^{2})
  - Water: 0.012 sq mi (0.03 km^{2})
- Elevation: 719 ft (219 m)

Population (2020)
  - Total: 330
  - Density: 87.7/sq mi (33.88/km^{2})
- Time zone: UTC-6 (Central (CST))
  - Summer (DST): UTC-5 (CDT)
- ZIP code: 35540-35541
- Area codes: 205, 659, 256
- FIPS code: 01-02500
- GNIS ID: 2405167

Arley is a town in Winston County, Alabama, United States. It incorporated on December 18, 1965. At the 2020 census the population was 330, down from 357 in 2010.

== Geography ==
Arley is located partially inside William B. Bankhead National Forest. The town has a total land area of 3.76 square miles (9.7 km^{2}). Bounded by Lewis Smith Lake and the nearby town of Addison, Arley's terrain is forested and rural with rolling hills.

=== Climate ===
The climate in this area is characterized by hot, humid summers and generally mild to cool winters. According to the Köppen Climate Classification system, Arley has a humid subtropical climate, abbreviated "Cfa" on climate maps.

== Demographics ==
Historical population
Census	Pop.	Note	%±
1970	164		—
1980	276		68.3%
1990	338		22.5%
2000	290		−14.2%
2010	357		23.1%
2020	330		−7.6%
U.S. Decennial Census

Arley was incorporated in 1965 and first appeared as a town on the 1970 census. The area it is located in was also named Arley, and the former precinct existed from 1920 until its dissolution in 1960. See below.

=== 2000 Census data ===
As of the census of 2000, there were 290 people, 123 households, and 89 families residing in the town. The population density was 103.6 inhabitants per square mile (40.0/km^{2}). There were 139 housing units at an average density of 49.7 per square mile (19.2/km^{2}). The racial makeup of the town was 99.31% White, and 0.69% from two or more races. 1.38% of the population were Hispanic or Latino of any race.

There were 123 households, out of which 22.0% had children under the age of 18 living with them, 60.2% were married couples living together, 9.8% had a female householder with no husband present, and 27.6% were non-families. 26.0% of all households were made up of individuals, and 13.8% had someone living alone who was 65 years of age or older. The average household size was 2.36 and the average family size was 2.82.

In the town, the population was spread out, with 17.9% under the age of 18, 9.7% from 18 to 24, 26.6% from 25 to 44, 27.2% from 45 to 64, and 18.6% who were 65 years of age or older. The median age was 41 years. For every 100 females, there were 100.0 males. For every 100 females age 18 and over, there were 91.9 males.

The median income for a household in the town was $26,500, and the median income for a family was $31,000. Males had a median income of $25,750 versus $16,667 for females. The per capita income for the town was $12,822. About 13.3% of families and 15.4% of the population were below the poverty line, including 25.0% of those under age 18 and 22.6% of those age 65 or over.

=== Historic Demographics ===
Census Year	Population & Racial Majority (Note: Note about colors: With the exception of Hispanic, Pacific Islander, Other, and 2 or More Races, the colors depicted refer to those historically ascribed to them (White (White/No background); Black (Brown); Native American (Red); Asian (Yellow)) and are there to be easily identified on said chart. No racism or malice of intent is meant to be implied by their usage.)	State Place Rank	County Place Rank	White (White, Non- Hispanic 1980-	Hispanic (1980-	Native American	Asian	Pacific Islander	Other	2 or More Races (2000-
1970 (Note: 1st year Arley reported on census)	164 (-) (Note: (-)Indicates no immediate prior population figure or rank) (Note: Racial demographics not reported for places less than 1,000 on the 1970-90 censuses.)	406th (-)	5th (-)							
1980	276 ↑	386th ↑	5th X (Note: X Indicates no change in rank)							
1990	338 ↑	377th ↑	5th X							
2000 (Note: With addition of "Hispanic" to census, which could also be a person of any race, both population totals and percentages will add up to more than the total population.)	290 ↓	414th ↓	5th X	284 (-) 97.9% (Note: From 2000 onwards, White population only reported on chart as "Non-Hispanic White/One Race", which will be less than the overall White population that would also include White Hispanics, which would be counted under Hispanic exclusively.)	4 (-) 1.4%					2 (-) 0.7%
2010	357 ↑	433rd ↓	5th X	336 ↑ 94.1%	5 ↑ 1.4%	2 (-) 0.6%	1 (-) 0.3%	1 (-) 0.3%	1 (-) 0.3%	15 ↑ 4.2%

== Arley Precinct (1920-1950) ==
Historical population
Census	Pop.	Note	%±
1920	1,030		—
1930	1,126		9.3%
1940	1,524		35.3%
1950	1,286		−15.6%
U.S. Decennial Census

Arley Precinct (Winston County 5th precinct) first appeared on the 1920 U.S. Census. It had been previously named Dismal from 1890-1910. In 1960, the precinct was merged as part of a larger reorganization of counties into the census division of Addison.

== Education ==
Public K-12 education in Arley is provided by Winston County Schools. Meek Elementary School (grades K-6) and Meek High School (grades 7-12) serve the town. Arley has a branch of the Carl Elliott Regional Library.
