= Selma High School =

Public secondary school in Selma, Alabama, United States

Location
- 2180 Broad Street; Selma, Alabama 36701; United States

Information
- Former names: A.G. Parrish High School and R.B. Hudson High School
- Established: 1970 (56 years ago)
- School district: Selma City School System
- CEEB code: 012430
- Teaching staff: 40.50 (on an FTE basis)
- Enrollment: 687 (2023-2024)
- Student to teacher ratio: 16.96
- Colors: Columbia blue and gold
- Team name: Saints
- Yearbook: Magnet
- Website: shs.selmacityschools.org

Selma High School is a public secondary school in Selma, Alabama. It is the only public high school in the Selma City School System.

== History ==
Selma High School was formed in 1970 in response to court-ordered integration, merging the former white A.G. Parrish High School and the former black R.B. Hudson High School. The school was housed in the building of Parrish High, which was constructed in 1939. R.B. Hudson's building was converted to Westside Junior High School, was renamed Selma Middle CHAT Academy and, in 2012, became known as R.B. Hudson Middle School. The high school building was demolished in 2011 and replaced with a new building that opened in August 2012; the former main entrance has been preserved as one wall of the media center.

In 1990, Selma High received national attention for a series of protests addressing the school's tracking procedures, which based students' class choices on "ability grouping" tracks. Ethnic minority students formed a larger percentage of the lower tracks, while the most advanced curriculum had primarily white students. In 1990, a group of students, led by Rose Sanders, a local activist and the wife of the local state senator, led protests at the high school against this policy and the dismissal of the system's first black superintendent, Norward Roussell. The protests were successful in removing the tracking programs at Selma High and in drawing larger attention to the racial disparities in these programs.

During the 1989–1990 academic year an incident occurred on school grounds that resulted in one student being shot. In response, the then governor Guy Hunt ordered the National Guard and state troopers to the high school. As a result of the protests and the school shooting, many white parents withdrew their children to attend county or private schools. This led to increasing segregation in the school system, as of April 2011, Selma High had only five white students and enrollment had shrunk from approximately 1,500 to below 1,000.

== Athletics ==
Selma High's sports teams compete in the Alabama High School Athletics Association's 6A classification. As of 2014, the school fielded teams in American football, basketball, baseball, wrestling, track and field, volleyball and softball.

The school won the 1946 AA, 1947 AA (as A.G. Parrish High), 1977 4A, and 1994 6A state boys' basketball championship, as well as golf championships in 1949 and 1950 (as A.G. Parrish High). The school holds the record for most consecutive victories in basketball (73, including playoff games and 88 regular season games) and most state tournament appearances.

== Notable alumni ==
- Ralph "Shug" Jordan, former Auburn University football coach (attended Parrish High)
- Terry Leach, former baseball player
- William Lehman, politician
- Darrio Melton, politician
- Jai Miller, former baseball player
- Ben Obomanu, wide receiver
- James Perkins Jr., first African-American mayor of Selma
- Terri Sewell, U.S. Congressperson for Alabama's 7th District
- Lachavious Simmons, football player
- Jeremiah Wright, football player
