= Keith Middle-High School =

Location
- 1166 Dallas County Rd 115; Orrville, Alabama 36767; United States; 32°17′31″N 87°14′09″W

Information
- Type: Public
- Established: 1923 (103 years ago)
- CEEB code: 012075
- Principal: Tommy Tisdale
- Staff: 10.15 (FTE)
- Grades: 6-12
- Enrollment: 188 (2024-2025)
- Student to teacher ratio: 18.52
- Colors: Royal blue and gold
- Mascot: Bear
- Website: kmhs.dallask12.org

Keith Middle High School is a public secondary school in Orrville, Alabama, part of Dallas County Schools. It is one of three public high school in the Dallas County Schools System.
