= Crenshaw County School District =

School district in Alabama

Crenshaw County School District is a school district in Crenshaw County, Alabama. The three schools in the district are Brantley High School, Highland Home School, Luverne High School.
