= Spring Garden, Alabama =

- Census-designated place
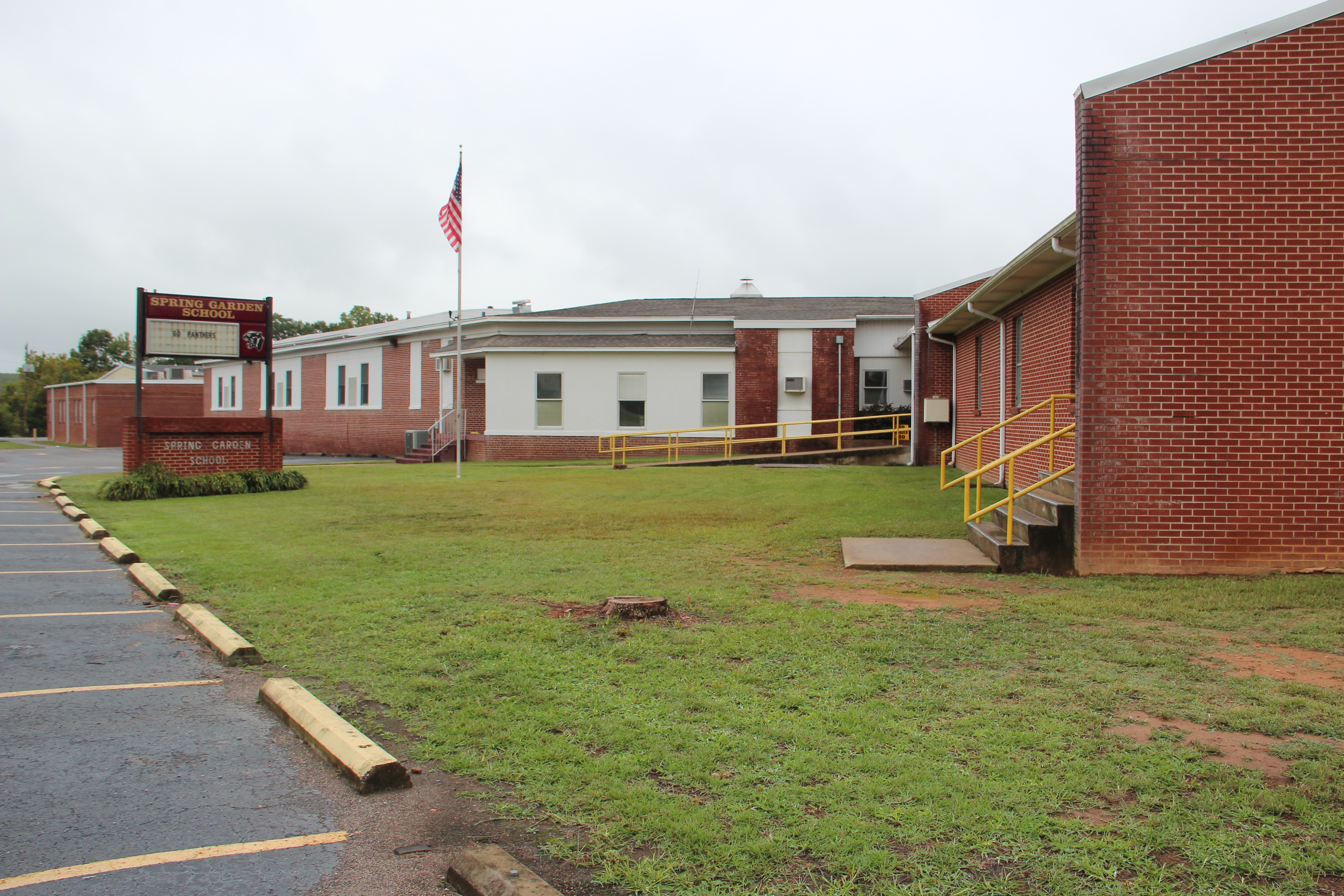
- Spring Garden School

- Location of Spring Garden in Cherokee County, Alabama.
- Coordinates: 33°58′22″N 85°33′14″W
- Country: United States
- State: Alabama
- County: Cherokee

Area
  - Total: 2.27 sq mi (5.87 km^{2})
  - Land: 2.27 sq mi (5.87 km^{2})
  - Water: 0 sq mi (0.00 km^{2})
- Elevation: 705 ft (215 m)

Population (2020)
  - Total: 216
  - Density: 95.3/sq mi (36.81/km^{2})
- Time zone: UTC-6 (Central (CST))
  - Summer (DST): UTC-5 (CDT)
- Area codes: 256 & 938
- GNIS feature ID: 2582700

Spring Garden is a census-designated place and unincorporated community in Cherokee County, Alabama, United States. Its population was 216 as of the 2020 census. The area was also known as Amberson or Ambersonville in the 19th century.

== History ==
A post office has been in operation under the name Spring Garden since 1844. The community was named for an early settler who was noted for his lush annual spring garden.

== Demographics ==
Historical population
Census	Pop.	Note	%±
1880	148		—
2010	238		—
2020	216		−9.2%
U.S. Decennial Census

Spring Garden was listed as a census designated place in the 2010 U.S. census.

Spring Garden CDP, Alabama – Racial and ethnic composition Note: the US Census treats Hispanic/Latino as an ethnic category. This table excludes Latinos from the racial categories and assigns them to a separate category. Hispanics/Latinos may be of any race.
Race / Ethnicity (NH = Non-Hispanic)	Pop 2010	Pop 2020	% 2010	% 2020
White alone (NH)	229	199	96.22%	92.13%
Black or African American alone (NH)	5	9	2.10%	4.17%
Native American or Alaska Native alone (NH)	0	1	0.00%	0.46%
Asian alone (NH)	0	0	0.00%	0.00%
Native Hawaiian or Pacific Islander alone (NH)	0	0	0.00%	0.00%
Other race alone (NH)	0	0	0.00%	0.00%
Mixed race or Multiracial (NH)	4	6	1.68%	2.78%
Hispanic or Latino (any race)	0	1	0.00%	0.46%
Total	238	216	100.00%	100.00%

== Education ==
Spring Garden Public Schools are part of the Cherokee County School District. Schools in the district include Cedar Bluff School, Centre Elementary School, Gaylesville School, Sand Rock School, Centre Middle School, Cherokee County High School, Spring Garden High School and Cherokee County Career & Technology Center.

Spring Garden High School is located in Spring Garden. The mission of Spring Garden High School is to prepare all students for the future, equipping them with academic skills, good work habits, marketable skills, an awareness of good health habits, and an appreciation for life.
