= Franklin County Schools (Alabama) =

School district in Alabama, United States

Address
- 500 Coffee Ave Northeast Russellville, Alabama, 35653; United States

District information
- Type: Public
- Grades: PK–12
- Schools: 10
- NCES District ID: 0101590

Students and staff
- Students: 3,563 (2024–2025)
- Teachers: 232.27 (on an FTE basis) (2024–2025)
- Staff: 266.32 (on an FTE basis) (2024–2025)
- Student–teacher ratio: 15.34 (2024–2025)

Other information
- Website: www.franklin.k12.al.us

Franklin County School District is a school district in Franklin County, Alabama, headquartered in Russellville.

== Schools ==
=== High Schools ===
- Belgreen High School
- Franklin County Career Technical Center
- Phil Campbell High School
- Red Bay High School
- Tharptown High School
- Vina High School

=== Middle Schools ===
- East Franklin Junior High School

=== Elementary Schools ===
- Phil Campbell Elementary School
- Red Bay Elementary School
- Tharptown Elementary School
