= Perry County School District (Alabama) =

School district in Alabama, United States

Address
- 200 Monroe Street Marion, Alabama, 36756; United States

District information
- Type: Public
- Grades: PreK–12
- NCES District ID: 0102670

Students and staff
- Students: 1,153
- Teachers: 68.43
- Staff: 79.0
- Student–teacher ratio: 16.85

Other information
- Website: perrycountyal.org

Perry County School District is a school district in Perry County, Alabama serving the community of Marion. It operates two schools: the Francis Marion school and Robert C. Hatch High School.

== Francis Marion School ==
At its current location, the Francis Marion School opened its doors in 1963 under the name of Francis Marion High School. Before that, it was known as Perry County High School. The school is named for Revolutionary War figure Francis Marion, who is better known as "The Swamp Fox." The school incorporates Pre-K through Middle School classes.
