= Houston County Schools (Alabama) =

School district in Alabama, United States

Houston County School District is a school district in Houston County, Alabama, headquartered in Dothan.

== Schools ==
=== High Schools ===
- Ashford High School
- Cottonwood High School
- Houston County Career Academy
- Houston County High School
- Rehobeth High School
- Wicksburg High School

=== Middle Schools ===
- Ashford Middle School
- Rehobeth Middle School

=== Elementary Schools ===
- Ashford Elementary School
- Cottonwood Elementary School
- Rehobeth Elementary School
- Webb Elementary School
- Wicksburg Elementary School

The county also offers a Virtual Academy and Dual Enrollment Program.
