= New Site, Alabama =

- Town
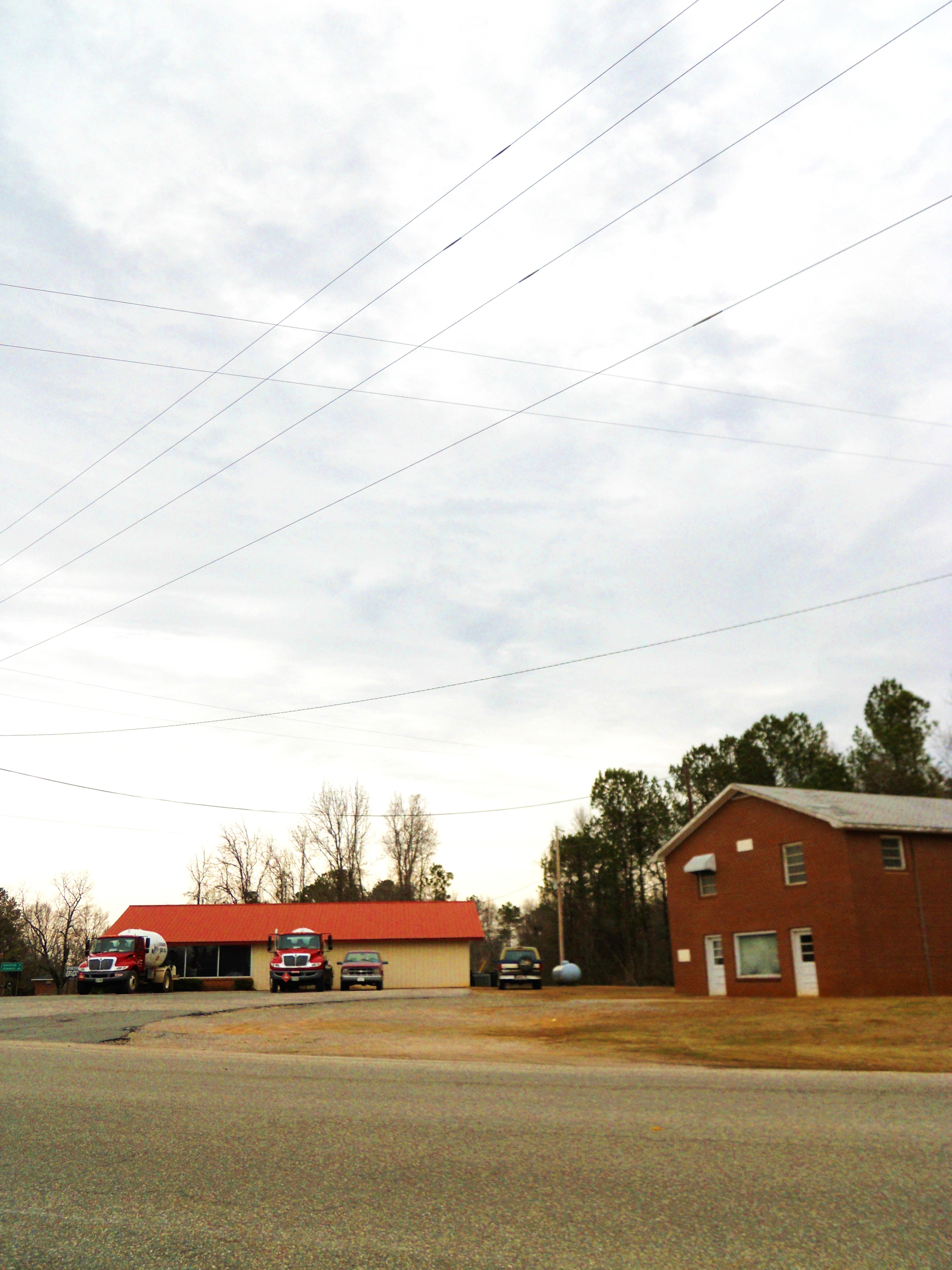
- Downtown New Site

- Location of New Site in Tallapoosa County, Alabama.
- Coordinates: 33°01′42″N 85°45′52″W
- Country: United States
- State: Alabama
- County: Tallapoosa

Area
  - Total: 9.88 sq mi (25.60 km^{2})
  - Land: 9.86 sq mi (25.55 km^{2})
  - Water: 0.015 sq mi (0.04 km^{2})
- Elevation: 830 ft (250 m)

Population (2020)
  - Total: 773
  - Density: 78.3/sq mi (30.25/km^{2})
- Time zone: UTC-6 (Central (CST))
  - Summer (DST): UTC-5 (CDT)
- FIPS code: 01-54432
- GNIS feature ID: 2406980
- Website: townofnewsite.com

New Site is a town in Tallapoosa County, Alabama, United States. It incorporated in 1965. As of the 2020 census, New Site had a population of 773. It is part of the Alexander City Micropolitan Statistical Area.

New Site is the closest municipality to the Horseshoe Bend National Military Park, which commemorates the Battle of Horseshoe Bend that hastened the end of the Creek War.

== Geography ==
According to the U.S. Census Bureau, the town has a total area of 9.8 square miles (25 km^{2}), all land.

== Demographics ==
Historical population
Census	Pop.	Note	%±
1880	72		—
1970	548		—
1980	430		−21.5%
1990	669		55.6%
2000	848		26.8%
2010	773		−8.8%
2020	773		0.0%
U.S. Decennial Census; 2013 Estimate

As of the census of 2000, there were 848 people, 339 households, and 240 families residing in the town. The population density was 86.8 inhabitants per square mile (33.5/km^{2}). There were 376 housing units at an average density of 38.5 per square mile (14.9/km^{2}). The racial makeup of the town was 89.27% White, 9.79% Black or African American, 0.59% Native American, 0.24% from other races, and 0.12% from two or more races. 0.47% of the population were Hispanic or Latino of any race.

There were 339 households, out of which 30.7% had children under the age of 18 living with them, 52.8% were married couples living together, 14.7% had a female householder with no husband present, and 29.2% were non-families. 26.0% of all households were made up of individuals, and 15.6% had someone living alone who was 65 years of age or older. The average household size was 2.50 and the average family size was 3.00.

In the town, the population was spread out, with 22.5% under the age of 18, 8.4% from 18 to 24, 30.2% from 25 to 44, 23.3% from 45 to 64, and 15.6% who were 65 years of age or older. The median age was 39 years. For every 100 females, there were 90.1 males. For every 100 females age 18 and over, there were 86.1 males.

The median income for a household in the town was $29,167, and the median income for a family was $37,396. Males had a median income of $25,977 versus $20,109 for females. The per capita income for the town was $14,113. About 13.3% of families and 17.6% of the population were below the poverty line, including 23.7% of those under age 18 and 15.9% of those age 65 or over.

== Notable person ==
- Albert Patterson, attorney who practiced in and was assassinated in Phenix City, Alabama
