= Thorsby, Alabama =

- Town
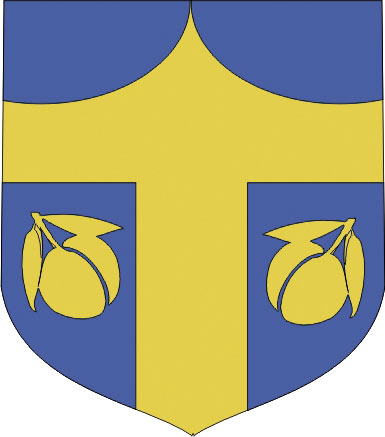
- Coat of arms
- Nicknames: Little Swede Town, The Peach Basket
- Location of Thorsby in Chilton County, Alabama.
- Coordinates: 32°55′22″N 86°44′09″W
- Country: United States
- State: Alabama
- County: Chilton
- Established: 1901

Government
  - Type: Mayor-Council

Area
  - Total: 5.84 sq mi (15.12 km^{2})
  - Land: 5.83 sq mi (15.10 km^{2})
  - Water: 0.012 sq mi (0.03 km^{2})
- Elevation: 689 ft (210 m)

Population (2020)
  - Total: 2,064
  - Density: 354.1/sq mi (136.72/km^{2})
- Time zone: UTC-6 (Central (CST))
  - Summer (DST): UTC-5 (CDT)
- ZIP code: 35171
- Area codes: 205, 659
- FIPS code: 01-76080
- GNIS feature ID: 2406731
- Website: www.townofthorsby.com

Thorsby is a town in Chilton County, Alabama, United States. As of the 2020 census, the population of the town was 2,064.

== Demographics ==
Historical population
Census	Pop.	Note	%±
1910	426		—
1920	513		20.4%
1930	771		50.3%
1940	772		0.1%
1950	828		7.3%
1960	968		16.9%
1970	944		−2.5%
1980	1,422		50.6%
1990	1,465		3.0%
2000	1,820		24.2%
2010	1,980		8.8%
2020	2,064		4.2%
U.S. Decennial Census; 2013 Estimate

=== 2020 census ===
As of the 2020 census, Thorsby had a population of 2,064. The median age was 37.7 years. 25.3% of residents were under the age of 18 and 15.6% of residents were 65 years of age or older. For every 100 females there were 94.2 males, and for every 100 females age 18 and over there were 92.9 males age 18 and over.

0.0% of residents lived in urban areas, while 100.0% lived in rural areas.

There were 755 households in Thorsby, of which 38.5% had children under the age of 18 living in them. Of all households, 54.6% were married-couple households, 14.3% were households with a male householder and no spouse or partner present, and 25.0% were households with a female householder and no spouse or partner present. About 20.6% of all households were made up of individuals and 10.5% had someone living alone who was 65 years of age or older. There were 486 families residing in the town.

There were 821 housing units, of which 8.0% were vacant. The homeowner vacancy rate was 1.7% and the rental vacancy rate was 12.6%.

Thorsby racial composition
Race	Num.	Perc.
White (non-Hispanic)	1,700	82.36%
Black or African American (non-Hispanic)	112	5.43%
Native American	1	0.05%
Asian	7	0.34%
Pacific Islander	1	0.05%
Other/Mixed	59	2.86%
Hispanic or Latino	184	8.91%

=== 2010 census ===
As of the census of 2010, there were 1,980 people, 733 households, and 573 families residing in the town. The population density was 386 inhabitants per square mile (149/km^{2}). There were 817 housing units at an average density of 158.9 per square mile (61.4/km^{2}). The racial makeup of the town was 89.7% White, 5.7% Black or African American, 0.1% Native American, 0.6% Asian, 0.1% Pacific Islander, 3.3% from other races, and 0.6% from two or more races. 5.7% of the population were Hispanic or Latino of any race.

There were 733 households, out of which 34.0% had children under the age of 18 living with them, 62.1% were married couples living together, 11.2% had a female householder with no husband present, and 21.8% were non-families. 19.2% of all households were made up of individuals, and 8.4% had someone living alone who was 65 years of age or older. The average household size was 2.70 and the average family size was 3.06.

In the town, the population was spread out, with 25.8% under the age of 18, 8.8% from 18 to 24, 27.7% from 25 to 44, 25.8% from 45 to 64, and 11.9% who were 65 years of age or older. The median age was 37 years. For every 100 females, there were 96.2 males. For every 100 females age 18 and over, there were 98.7 males.

The median income for a household in the town was $45,179, and the median income for a family was $52,813. Males had a median income of $43,235 versus $37,772 for females. The per capita income for the town was $21,269. 11.9% of the population and 9.5% of families were below the poverty line. Out of the total population, 19.6% of those under the age of 18 and 7.6% of those 65 and older were living below the poverty line.

== Geography ==
Thorsby is located north of the center of Chilton County.

According to the U.S. Census Bureau, the town has a total area of 5.1 square miles (13.3 km^{2}), of which 0.012 square miles (0.03 km^{2}), or 0.19%, is water.

=== Climate ===
Thorsby has a Humid subtropical climate, characterized by hot summers, cold winters, and abundant rainfall, as most Alabama receives over 50 inches (1,300 mm) of rain annually. The spring and summer are moderately rainy, with frequent strong to severe thunderstorms. The fall and winter months are cold and cloudy. The town is almost always under cloud cover from November to March. January sees average daily high temperatures of 53.0 °F (11.7 °C) and lows of 31.8 °F (−0.1 °C). In July the average daily high is 90.6 °F (32.6 °C) and the low is 69.7 °F (20.9 °C). The average annual temperature in Thorsby is 62 °F (17 °C). In late winter, normally from January through February, Thorsby normally acquires small amounts of snow accumulation. Annual snowfall averages only 1.9 inches (48 mm), but during the Great Blizzard of 1993, the town received over 1 foot (0.30 m) of snow, with drifts almost 3 feet (0.91 m), and on February 28 - March 1, 2009, the town accumulated almost 6 inches (150 mm) of snow. The average yearly rainfall in Thorsby is about 59 inches (1,500 mm), with March being the wettest month and October the driest.

The spring and fall months are pleasant but variable as cold fronts frequently bring strong to severe thunderstorms and occasional tornadoes to the region. The fall season features more rainfall and fewer storms, as well as lower humidity than the spring, but it is also a secondary severe weather season. Thorsby is located on the heart of a Tornado Alley known as the Dixie Alley due to the frequency of tornadoes in Central Alabama. In late summer and fall months, Thorsby experiences occasional tropical storms and hurricanes due to its proximity to the Central Gulf Coast.

Climate data for Thorsby Experiment Station, Alabama (1991–2020 normals, extremes 1957–present)
Month	Jan	Feb	Mar	Apr	May	Jun	Jul	Aug	Sep	Oct	Nov	Dec	Year
Record high °F (°C)	79 (26)	82 (28)	89 (32)	91 (33)	97 (36)	100 (38)	104 (40)	103 (39)	100 (38)	100 (38)	87 (31)	81 (27)	104 (40)
Mean daily maximum °F (°C)	55.1 (12.8)	59.4 (15.2)	67.0 (19.4)	74.4 (23.6)	81.5 (27.5)	87.2 (30.7)	89.8 (32.1)	89.6 (32.0)	85.2 (29.6)	76.2 (24.6)	65.8 (18.8)	57.4 (14.1)	74.0 (23.3)
Daily mean °F (°C)	44.0 (6.7)	47.9 (8.8)	54.7 (12.6)	61.9 (16.6)	69.7 (20.9)	76.4 (24.7)	79.3 (26.3)	78.9 (26.1)	74.1 (23.4)	63.8 (17.7)	53.4 (11.9)	46.4 (8.0)	62.5 (16.9)
Mean daily minimum °F (°C)	33.0 (0.6)	36.3 (2.4)	42.5 (5.8)	49.4 (9.7)	57.9 (14.4)	65.7 (18.7)	68.7 (20.4)	68.2 (20.1)	62.9 (17.2)	51.4 (10.8)	41.0 (5.0)	35.3 (1.8)	51.0 (10.6)
Record low °F (°C)	−4 (−20)	5 (−15)	12 (−11)	28 (−2)	39 (4)	44 (7)	53 (12)	54 (12)	38 (3)	27 (−3)	15 (−9)	0 (−18)	−4 (−20)
Average precipitation inches (mm)	5.60 (142)	5.65 (144)	5.83 (148)	4.79 (122)	4.09 (104)	4.78 (121)	5.37 (136)	4.09 (104)	3.59 (91)	2.88 (73)	4.34 (110)	5.18 (132)	56.19 (1,427)
Average precipitation days (≥ 0.01 in)	8.6	8.8	8.9	7.6	8.1	9.3	9.5	8.0	6.1	5.4	6.5	8.2	95.0
Source: NOAA

== History ==
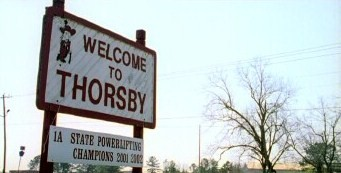
Thorsby's town sign displaying the local high school's mascot, the Rebel Man

Thorsby is a small Central Alabama town located in Chilton County. Thorsby was first settled in 1895 and incorporated in 1901 by Scandinavian immigrants who had originally settled in the midwestern United States, but who were seeking a milder climate and fertile soil for growing food. One of those earliest settlers was Theodore T. Thorson, for whom the town was eventually named (the suffix "by" meaning "settlement" in Scandinavian languages). The town grew quickly, with two hotels, a sawmill and lumber company, and two wineries being built within the first couple of years. The town of Thorsby was declared a promised land for northerners looking to relocate to a warmer climate, suitable for farming and better health. The fertile soil of the South produced grapes in large numbers, along with other fruits such as strawberries, and the peaches for which Chilton County is famous. The founders formed the Concordia Land and Improvement Association and began advertising in New England newspapers about the "utopia" they had discovered in the Southeastern United States. Many traveled by railroad to purchase a tract of land and start a better life. Thorsby became affectionately known as the little "Swede town" by locals.

Thorsby is located almost exactly between the downtown areas of Birmingham and Montgomery, with either destination being approximately 45 miles (72 km) from the center of town.

Each autumn, the town of Thorsby celebrates its heritage with the Annual Swedish Festival that includes an arts and crafts fair, a pageant, music, car and motorcycle shows and food native to the American South. The town maintains the old Norwegian Lutheran Church, now called "Helen Jenkins Chapel". It is a venue available for public use. A Scandinavian Cemetery is available for visits any time. The town operates its own police and fire departments, as well as departments of building inspection, law, parks and recreation, and the Thorsby Water Works. The Chilton County School System operates the K-12 Thorsby School in the town.

== Thorsby High School ==
Thorsby High School's official mascot, the Thorsby Rebel

Thorsby High School is a 3-A, K-12 educational institution. It has been a public school since 1957. The school originated as Thorsby Institute shortly after the town was founded in the early 1900s. Thorsby Institute was founded as a private school and was turned over to the Chilton County School District to become a part of the public school system. Thorsby Institute provided a quality education for many years to local and out-of-state students.

There is an old school house in central Thorsby, which was in use until the mid-1970s.

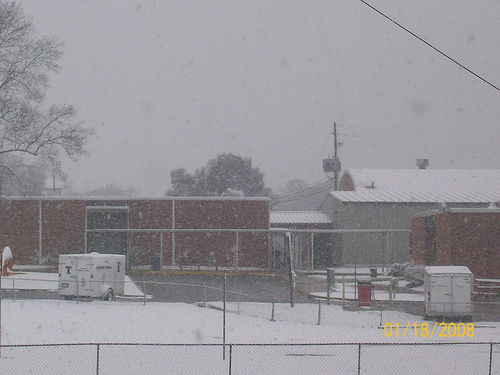
Thorsby High School, January 2008

Based on its state test results, Thorsby High School has received a Great Schools Rating of 7 out of 10. 834 students attended Thorsby High School in the 2006–2007 school year. During the 2006–07 school year there were 51 teachers on staff, giving Thorsby High School a student-teacher ratio of 16.5. There were 54 kindergartners, 66 first graders, 61 second graders, 59 third graders, 65 fourth graders, 69 fifth graders, 74 sixth graders, 74 seventh graders, 69 eighth graders, 70 freshmen, 53 sophomores, 63 juniors, and 57 seniors during that year. Currently, there are 388 (45%) of students enrolled that are eligible for discounted/free lunch. The school mascot is the Thorsby Rebel, and the colors are maroon and white.

== Notable people ==
- Jackie Burkett, former NFL center
- William Sprague (1830–1915); U.S. Senator and the 27th governor of Rhode Island; (spent ages 4–7 residing in Thorsby).
