= Holt High School (Alabama) =

Coordinates: 33.2196°N 87.4769°W

Location
- 301 44th Ct; Holt, Alabama 35404

Information
- School type: Public
- Established: c. 1910
- Superintendent: Keri Johnson
- Principal: Daniel Dickens
- Grades: 9-12
- Enrollment: 424
- Student to teacher ratio: 14.57
- Colors: White & Purple
- Mascot: Ironmen

Holt High School is a public high school in Tuscaloosa County, Alabama. More than 400 students are enrolled.

== History ==
The school's first class graduated in 1910. At the time of opening, only whites were permitted to attend.

In 1941, the school was destroyed by fire, causing $75,000 in damage. Following the fire, students were sent to a building that served as a temporary school. In early 1944, that building was also damaged by fire. A new school was built at its current location later that year.

The school admitted its first African-American students in 1965.

In 1977, Holt High School made history by becoming the first school in the United States to offer multi-service banking to its students. Services included savings accounts, checking accounts, and loans.

By 2013, the building had aged considerably, becoming the oldest building in the district. In 2016, construction on a new school started, which concluded in 2018.

== Demographics ==
The demographic breakdown by race/ethnicity of the students enrolled for the 2022–2023 school year was:

- Black – 184
- Hispanic – 147
- White – 90
- Native Hawaiian/Pacific Islander – 1
- Two or More - 2
