= Lynn, Alabama =

- Town
- Location of Lynn in Winston County, Alabama.
- Coordinates: 34°03′17″N 87°33′20″W
- Country: United States
- State: Alabama
- County: Winston

Area
  - Total: 10.66 sq mi (27.62 km^{2})
  - Land: 10.65 sq mi (27.59 km^{2})
  - Water: 0.015 sq mi (0.04 km^{2})
- Elevation: 686 ft (209 m)

Population (2020)
  - Total: 610
  - Density: 57.3/sq mi (22.11/km^{2})
- Time zone: UTC-6 (Central (CST))
  - Summer (DST): UTC-5 (CDT)
- ZIP code: 35575
- Area codes: 205, 659
- FIPS code: 01-44800
- GNIS feature ID: 2406065
- Website: https://townoflynn.org/

Lynn is a town in Winston County, Alabama, United States. It incorporated in April 1952. At the 2020 census the population was 832. Up from the 2010 census (659) up from 597 in 2000.

== Geography ==
According to the U.S. Census Bureau, the town has a total area of 6.6 square miles (17 km^{2}), all land.

== Demographics ==
Historical population
Census	Pop.	Note	%±
1960	531		—
1970	286		−46.1%
1980	554		93.7%
1990	611		10.3%
2000	597		−2.3%
2010	659		10.4%
2020	610		−7.4%
U.S. Decennial Census; 2013 Estimate

As of the census of 2000, there were 597 people, 259 households, and 184 families residing in the town. The population density was 91.2 inhabitants per square mile (35.2/km^{2}). There were 291 housing units at an average density of 44.4 per square mile (17.1/km^{2}). The racial makeup of the town was 98.32% White, 0.17% Black or African American, 0.17% Native American, 0.17% Asian, 0.17% Pacific Islander, and 1.01% from two or more races.

There were 259 households, out of which 29.7% had children under the age of 18 living with them, 60.6% were married couples living together, 8.1% had a female householder with no husband present, and 28.6% were non-families. 27.0% of all households were made up of individuals, and 12.0% had someone living alone who was 65 years of age or older. The average household size was 2.31 and the average family size was 2.75.

In the town, the population was spread out, with 22.1% under the age of 18, 5.9% from 18 to 24, 31.5% from 25 to 44, 26.6% from 45 to 64, and 13.9% who were 65 years of age or older. The median age was 39 years. For every 100 females, there were 87.7 males. For every 100 females age 18 and over, there were 81.6 males.

The median income for a household in the town was $26,125, and the median income for a family was $32,955. Males had a median income of $30,357 versus $24,375 for females. The per capita income for the town was $18,932. About 13.2% of families and 21.5% of the population were below the poverty line, including 28.5% of those under age 18 and 26.5% of those age 65 or over.

== Education ==
Lynn has an elementary school, Lynn Elementary School, and a high school, Lynn High School. The mascot for both schools is the bear and school colors are black, red and white. Lynn Elementary and Lynn High School are part of the Winston County School System.
