= Sand Rock, Alabama =

- Town
- Motto: "Built on sand solid as a rock"
- Location of Sand Rock in Cherokee County and DeKalb County, Alabama.
- Coordinates: 34°13′57″N 85°46′14″W
- Country: United States
- State: Alabama
- Counties: Cherokee, DeKalb

Area
  - Total: 5.07 sq mi (13.13 km^{2})
  - Land: 5.07 sq mi (13.13 km^{2})
  - Water: 0 sq mi (0.00 km^{2})
- Elevation: 860 ft (260 m)

Population (2020)
  - Total: 591
  - Density: 116.5/sq mi (44.99/km^{2})
- Time zone: UTC-6 (Central (CST))
  - Summer (DST): UTC-5 (CDT)
- ZIP code: 35983
- Area code: 256
- FIPS code: 01-67920
- GNIS feature ID: 2407282
- Website: www.sandrock-al.org

Sand Rock is a town in Cherokee and DeKalb counties in the U.S. state of Alabama. It incorporated in 1988. At the 2020 census, the population was 591.

== History ==
A post office called Sand Rock was established in 1855, and remained in operation until it was discontinued in 1903. Legend has it the city was named after a pioneer sat on a rock upon sandy ground.

== Geography ==
Sand Rock is located in western Cherokee County at 34°13'57.115" North, 85°46'13.516" West (34.232532, -85.770421), atop Lookout Mountain. A portion of the town extends north into DeKalb County. The town is bordered to the south by the town of Leesburg.

According to the U.S. Census Bureau, the town has a total area of 4.4 square miles (11.3 km^{2}), all land.

== Demographics ==
Historical population
Census	Pop.	Note	%±
1990	438		—
2000	509		16.2%
2010	560		10.0%
2020	591		5.5%
U.S. Decennial Census; 2013 Estimate

As of the census of 2000, there were 509 people, 195 households, and 154 families residing in the town. The population density was 112.4 inhabitants per square mile (43.4/km^{2}). There were 215 housing units at an average density of 47.5 per square mile (18.3/km^{2}). The racial makeup of the town was 99.41% White, and 0.39% Black or African American.

There were 195 households, out of which 33.8% had children under the age of 18 living with them, 68.7% were married couples living together, 7.7% had a female householder with no husband present, and 21.0% were non-families. 19.5% of all households were made up of individuals, and 9.2% had someone living alone who was 65 years of age or older. The average household size was 2.61 and the average family size was 2.96.

In the town, the population was spread out, with 25.3% under the age of 18, 7.9% from 18 to 24, 28.9% from 25 to 44, 23.6% from 45 to 64, and 14.3% who were 65 years of age or older. The median age was 37 years. For every 100 females, there were 99.6 males. For every 100 females age 18 and over, there were 97.9 males.

The median income for a household in the town was $35,179, and the median income for a family was $44,063. Males had a median income of $28,523 versus $17,375 for females. The per capita income for the town was $18,845. About 10.9% of families and 12.6% of the population were below the poverty line, including 16.5% of those under age 18 and 19.7% of those age 65 or over.

== Education ==
The first school was a one-room log cabin. Around 1895, the school was moved to a more central location and was built as a two-room school. In 1916, another room was added to accommodate more students. In 1922 a new school building was constructed. It had five rooms including a small library. Slowly the school expanded and added more grades. In 1932, Sand Rock School had its first graduating class.

Sand Rock School is part of the Cherokee County Schools. Schools in the district include Cedar Bluff School, Centre Elementary School, Gaylesville School, Sand Rock School, Centre Middle School, Cherokee County High School, Spring Garden High School and Cherokee County Career & Technology Center.
