= List of municipalities in Alabama =

Map of the United States with Alabama highlighted

Map of Alabama showing counties and cities

Alabama is a state located in the Southern United States. According to the 2020 United States Census, Alabama is the 24th most populous state with 5,024,279 inhabitants and the 28th largest by land area spanning 50,645.33 square miles (131,170.8 km^{2}) of land. Alabama is divided into 67 counties and contains 465 municipalities consisting of 174 cities and 287 towns. These cities and towns cover only 9.6% of the state's land mass but are home to 60.4% of its population.

The Code of Alabama 1975 defines the legal use of the terms "town" and "city" based on population. A municipality with a population of 2,000 or more is a city, while less than 2,000 is a town. For legislative purposes, municipalities are divided into eight classes based on the municipality's population recorded in the 1970 federal decennial census. The class of a municipality does not change if its population increases or decreases since the population figures are based on the 1970 federal census. Any municipality incorporated after June 28, 1979, is placed in a class according to the population of the municipality at the time of its incorporation. Class 1 is defined as all cities with a population of at least 300,000, as of the 1970 census. Birmingham is the state's only Class 1 municipality. Class 2 are cities between 175,000 and 299,999 inhabitants, as of the 1970 census. Mobile is the state's only Class 2 municipality. Montgomery and Huntsville are Class 3 municipalities. Class 3 cities are those with populations between 100,000 and 174,999 inhabitants, as of the 1970 census. Tuscaloosa and Gadsden are Class 4 cities with between 50,000 and 99,999 inhabitants, as of the 1970 census. Class 5 are cities with a population greater than 25,000 and less than 49,999. Class 6 are those with between 12,000 and 24,999 inhabitants, and Class 7 are cities with a population from 6,000 to 11,999 inhabitants. Class 8 includes all towns, plus all remaining cities with populations of less than 6,000.

The largest municipality by population is Huntsville with 215,006 residents while the smallest by population is Oak Hill with 14 residents. The largest municipality by land area is Huntsville, which spans 209.05 mi^{2} (541.4 km^{2}), while the smallest is McMullen at 0.11 mi^{2} (0.28 km^{2}).

== List of cities and towns ==
Largest cities and towns in Alabama by population

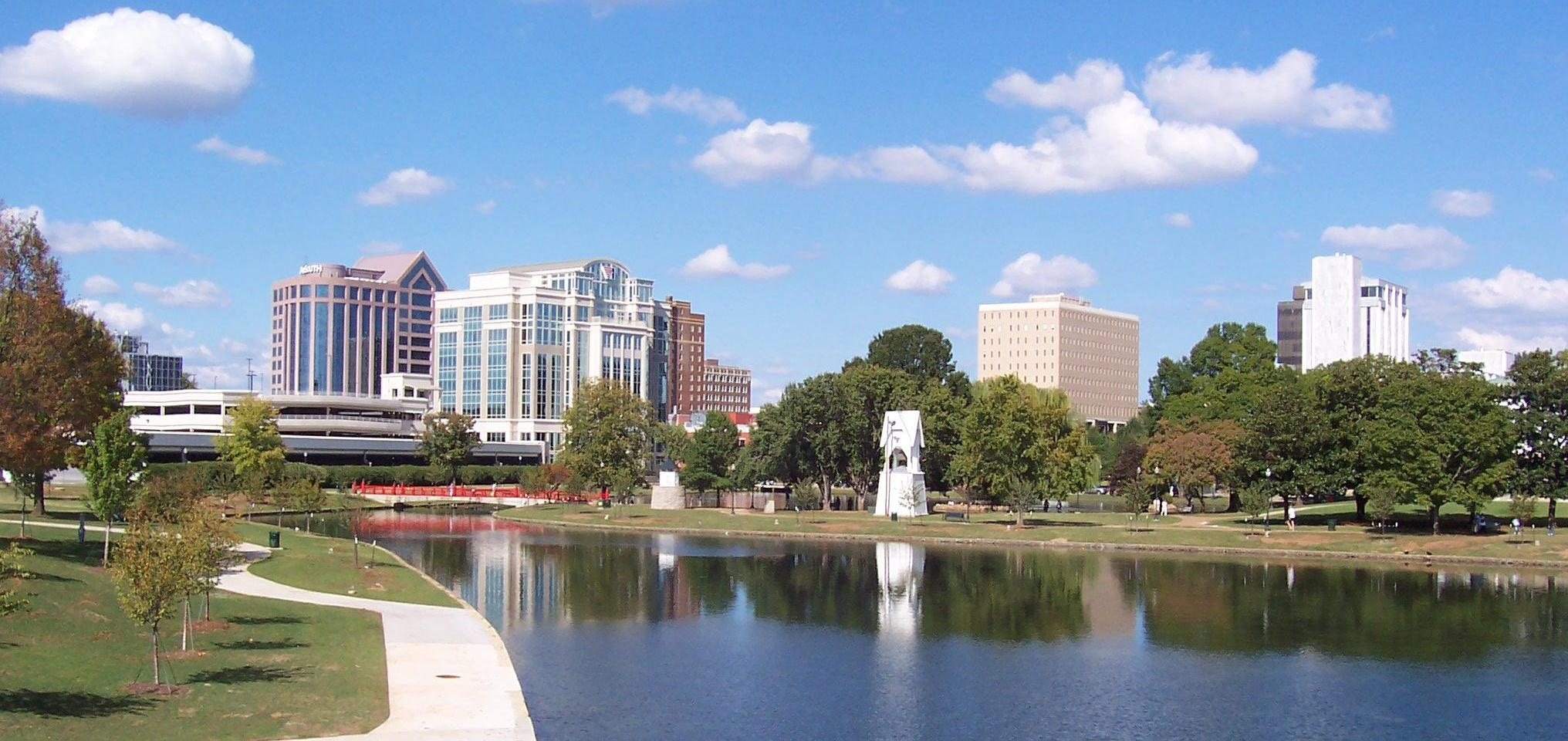
Skyline of Huntsville, Alabama's most populous municipality

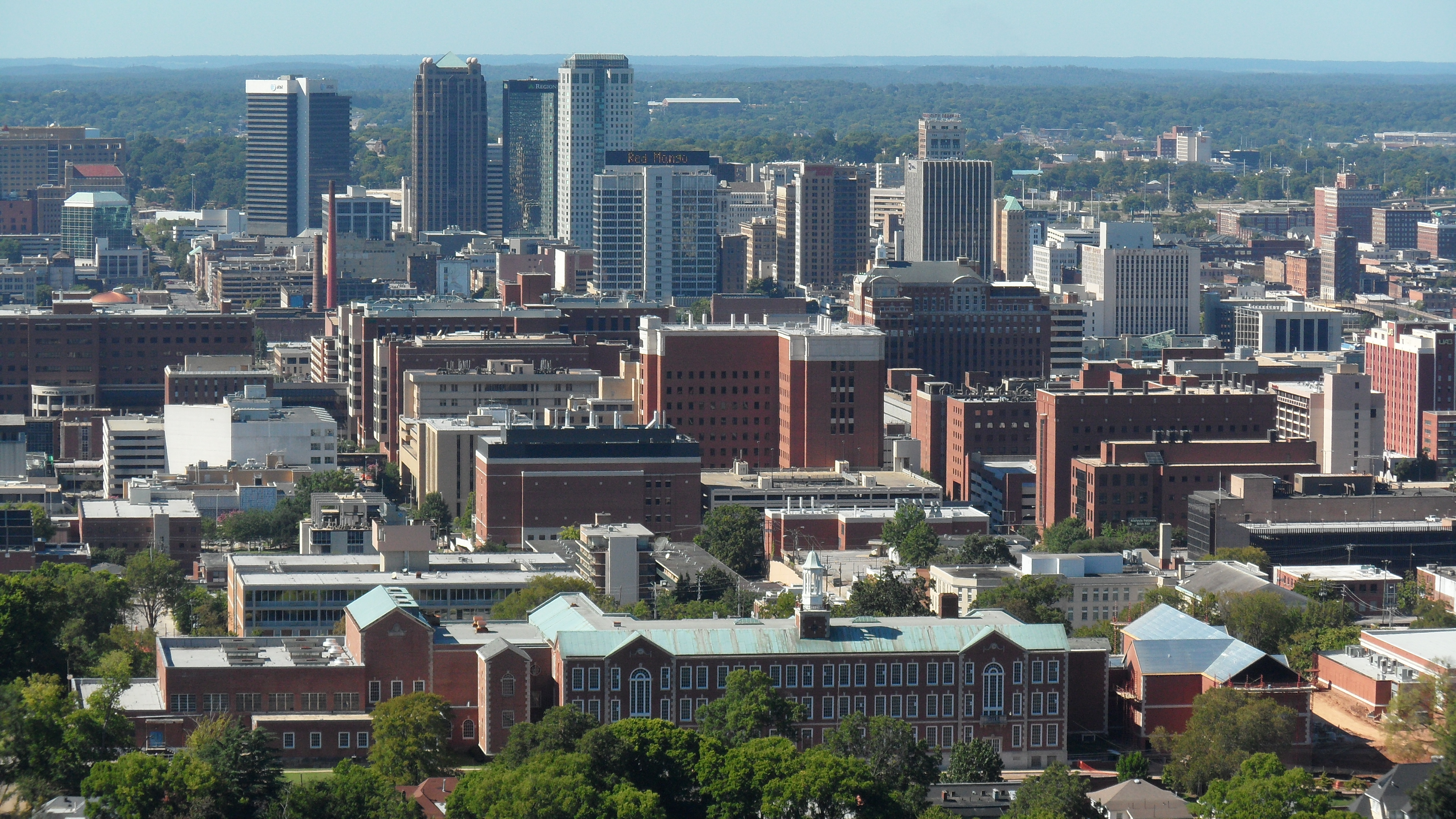
Birmingham is Alabama's second most populous municipality

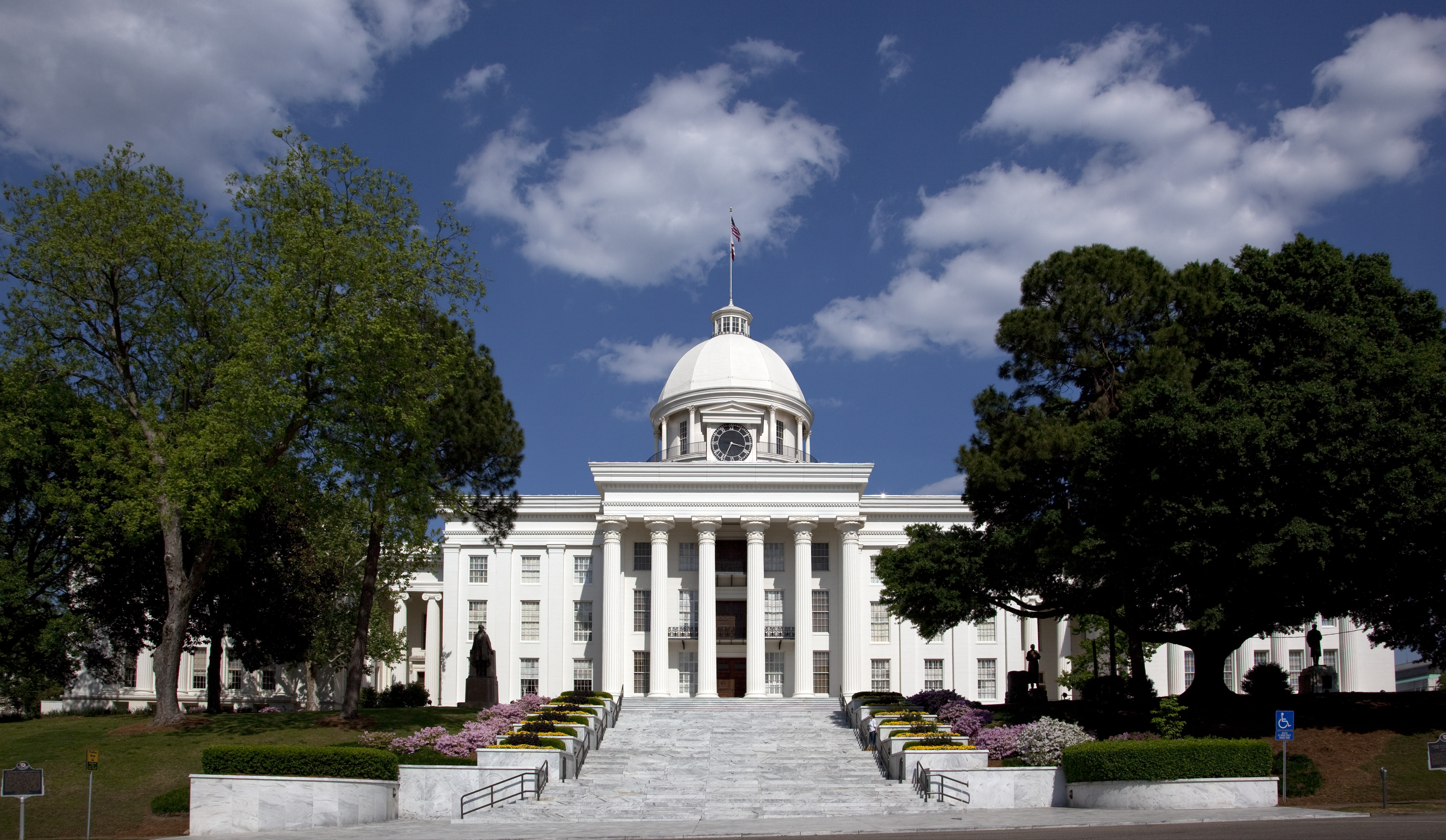
Alabama State Capitol in Montgomery, Alabama's capital city and third most populous municipality

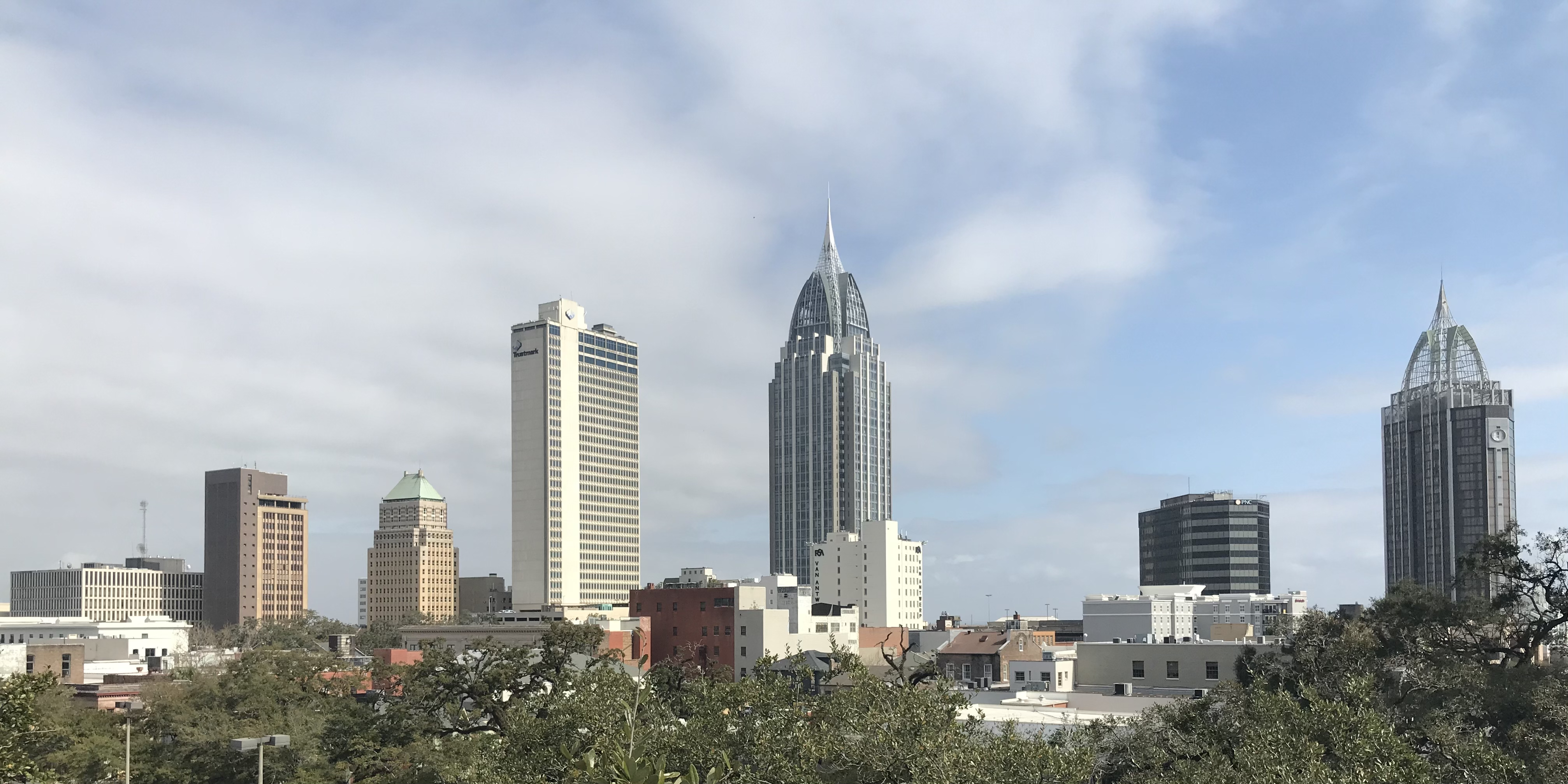
Skyline of Mobile, Alabama's fourth most populous municipality

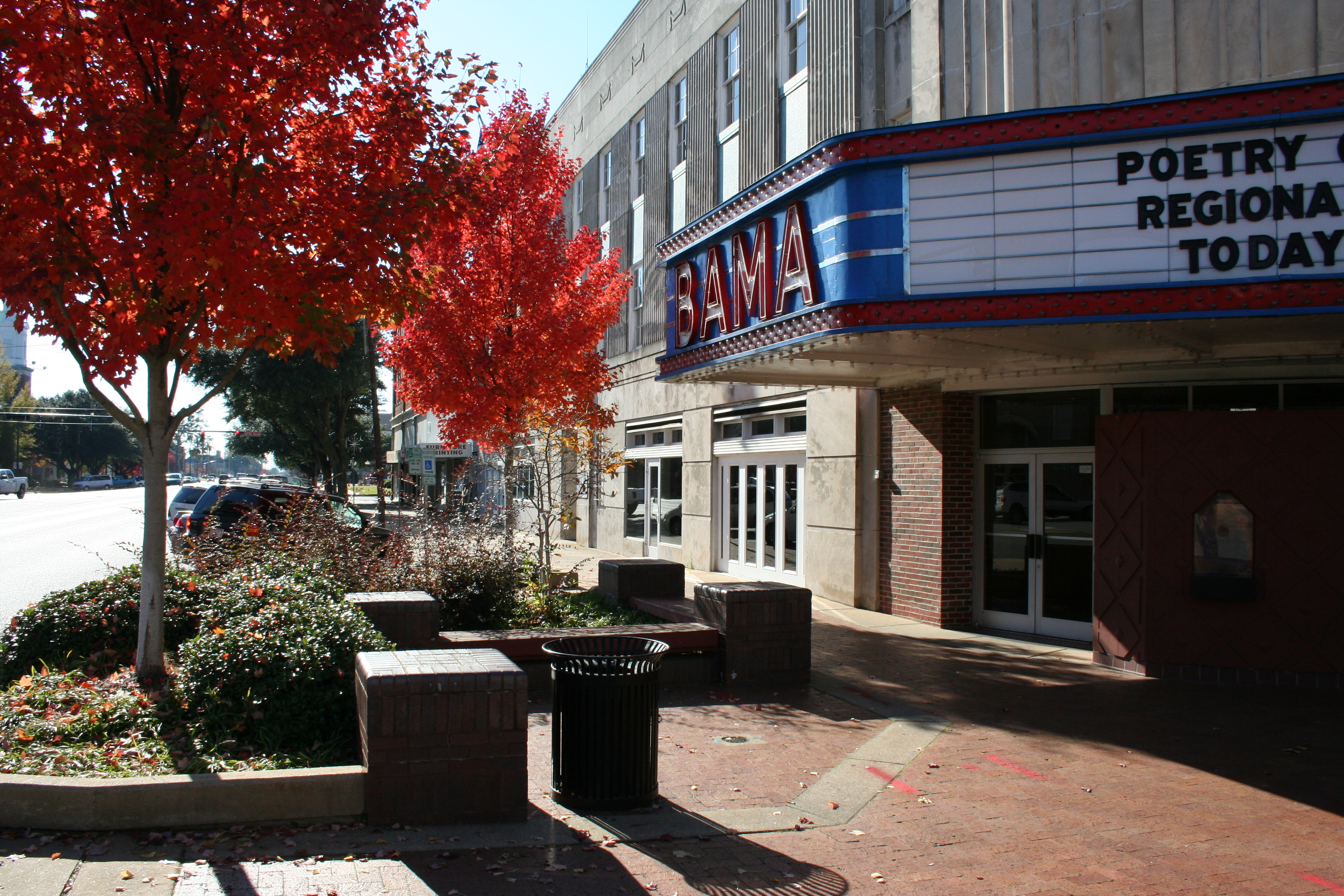
Downtown area of Tuscaloosa, Alabama's fifth most populous municipality

† County seat

‡ State capital and county seat

Municipalities in Alabama
Name	Type	County(ies) (Note: For municipalities located in more than one county, the primary county (according to U.S. Census) is listed first.)	Population (2020)	Population (2010)	Change	Land area (2020)		Population density
Name	Type	County(ies)	Population (2020)	Population (2010)	Change	sq mi	km^{2}	Population density
Abbeville†	City	Henry County	2,358	2,688	−12.3%	15.54	40.2	151.7/sq mi (58.6/km^{2})
Adamsville	City	Jefferson County	4,366	4,522	−3.4%	25.13	65.1	173.7/sq mi (67.1/km^{2})
Addison	Town	Winston County	659	758	−13.1%	3.77	9.8	174.8/sq mi (67.5/km^{2})
Akron	Town	Hale County	225	356	−36.8%	0.69	1.8	326.1/sq mi (125.9/km^{2})
Alabaster	City	Shelby County	33,284	30,352	+9.7%	25.04	64.9	1,329.2/sq mi (513.2/km^{2})
Albertville	City	Marshall County	22,386	21,160	+5.8%	26.56	68.8	842.8/sq mi (325.4/km^{2})
Alexander City	City	Tallapoosa County	14,843	14,875	−0.2%	40.84	105.8	363.4/sq mi (140.3/km^{2})
Aliceville	City	Pickens County	2,177	2,486	−12.4%	4.56	11.8	477.4/sq mi (184.3/km^{2})
Allgood	Town	Blount County	548	622	−11.9%	1.04	2.7	526.9/sq mi (203.4/km^{2})
Altoona	Town	Etowah County; Blount County	948	933	+1.6%	4.32	11.2	219.4/sq mi (84.7/km^{2})
Andalusia†	City	Covington County	8,805	9,015	−2.3%	19.66	50.9	447.9/sq mi (172.9/km^{2})
Anderson	Town	Lauderdale County	254	282	−9.9%	1.29	3.3	196.9/sq mi (76.0/km^{2})
Anniston†	City	Calhoun County	21,564	23,106	−6.7%	45.64	118.2	472.5/sq mi (182.4/km^{2})
Arab	City	Marshall County; Cullman County	8,461	8,050	+5.1%	12.98	33.6	651.8/sq mi (251.7/km^{2})
Ardmore	Town	Limestone County	1,321	1,194	+10.6%	2.04	5.3	647.5/sq mi (250.0/km^{2})
Argo	City	St. Clair County; Jefferson County	4,368	4,071	+7.3%	10.77	27.9	405.6/sq mi (156.6/km^{2})
Ariton	Town	Dale County	662	764	−13.4%	5.09	13.2	130.1/sq mi (50.2/km^{2})
Arley	Town	Winston County	330	357	−7.6%	3.76	9.7	87.8/sq mi (33.9/km^{2})
Ashford	City	Houston County	2,246	2,148	+4.6%	6.30	16.3	356.5/sq mi (137.6/km^{2})
Ashland†	City	Clay County	1,984	2,037	−2.6%	7.32	19.0	271.0/sq mi (104.6/km^{2})
Ashville†	City	St. Clair County	2,346	2,212	+6.1%	19.21	49.8	122.1/sq mi (47.2/km^{2})
Athens†	City	Limestone County	25,406	21,897	+16.0%	39.54	102.4	642.5/sq mi (248.1/km^{2})
Atmore	City	Escambia County	8,391	10,194	−17.7%	21.85	56.6	384.0/sq mi (148.3/km^{2})
Attalla	City	Etowah County	5,827	6,048	−3.7%	6.98	18.1	834.8/sq mi (322.3/km^{2})
Auburn	City	Lee County	76,143	53,380	+42.6%	58.07	150.4	1,311.2/sq mi (506.3/km^{2})
Autaugaville	Town	Autauga County	795	870	−8.6%	7.62	19.7	104.3/sq mi (40.3/km^{2})
Avon	Town	Houston County	465	543	−14.4%	2.65	6.9	175.5/sq mi (67.8/km^{2})
Babbie	Town	Covington County	625	603	+3.6%	11.47	29.7	54.5/sq mi (21.0/km^{2})
Baileyton	Town	Cullman County	649	610	+6.4%	5.26	13.6	123.4/sq mi (47.6/km^{2})
Bakerhill	Town	Barbour County	211	279	−24.4%	2.75	7.1	76.7/sq mi (29.6/km^{2})
Banks	Town	Pike County	156	179	−12.8%	1.99	5.2	78.4/sq mi (30.3/km^{2})
Bay Minette†	City	Baldwin County	8,107	8,044	+0.8%	8.57	22.2	946.0/sq mi (365.2/km^{2})
Bayou La Batre	City	Mobile County	2,204	2,558	−13.8%	7.48	19.4	294.7/sq mi (113.8/km^{2})
Bear Creek	Town	Marion County	1,047	1,070	−2.1%	13.63	35.3	76.8/sq mi (29.7/km^{2})
Beatrice	Town	Monroe County	204	301	−32.2%	1.35	3.5	151.1/sq mi (58.3/km^{2})
Beaverton	Town	Lamar County	187	201	−7.0%	4.59	11.9	40.7/sq mi (15.7/km^{2})
Belk	Town	Fayette County	186	215	−13.5%	1.39	3.6	133.8/sq mi (51.7/km^{2})
Benton	Town	Lowndes County	41	49	−16.3%	0.30	0.78	136.7/sq mi (52.8/km^{2})
Berlin (Note: Berlin incorporated in 2018 and is thus not included in the 2010 census.)	Town	Cullman County	476			0.83	2.1	573.5/sq mi (221.4/km^{2})
Berry	Town	Fayette County	1,216	1,148	+5.9%	10.77	27.9	112.9/sq mi (43.6/km^{2})
Bessemer	City	Jefferson County	26,019	27,456	−5.2%	39.85	103.2	652.9/sq mi (252.1/km^{2})
Billingsley	Town	Autauga County	125	144	−13.2%	1.31	3.4	95.4/sq mi (36.8/km^{2})
Birmingham†	City	Jefferson County; Shelby County	200,733	212,237	−5.4%	146.07	378.3	1,374.2/sq mi (530.6/km^{2})
Black	Town	Geneva County	221	207	+6.8%	3.08	8.0	71.8/sq mi (27.7/km^{2})
Blountsville	Town	Blount County	1,826	1,684	+8.4%	5.42	14.0	336.9/sq mi (130.1/km^{2})
Blue Springs	Town	Barbour County	84	96	−12.5%	2.90	7.5	29.0/sq mi (11.2/km^{2})
Boaz	City	Marshall County; Etowah County	10,107	9,551	+5.8%	14.55	37.7	694.6/sq mi (268.2/km^{2})
Boligee	Town	Greene County	301	328	−8.2%	3.95	10.2	76.2/sq mi (29.4/km^{2})
Bon Air	Town	Talladega County	172	116	+48.3%	1.33	3.4	129.3/sq mi (49.9/km^{2})
Brantley	Town	Crenshaw County	825	809	+2.0%	3.11	8.1	265.3/sq mi (102.4/km^{2})
Brent	City	Bibb County	2,972	4,947	−39.9%	8.78	22.7	338.5/sq mi (130.7/km^{2})
Brewton†	City	Escambia County	5,276	5,408	−2.4%	11.20	29.0	511.3/sq mi (197.4/km^{2})
Bridgeport	City	Jackson County	2,264	2,418	−6.4%	4.41	11.4	513.4/sq mi (198.2/km^{2})
Brighton	City	Jefferson County	2,337	2,945	−20.6%	1.42	3.7	1,645.8/sq mi (635.4/km^{2})
Brilliant	Town	Marion County	845	900	−6.1%	10.69	27.7	79.0/sq mi (30.5/km^{2})
Brookside	Town	Jefferson County	1,253	1,363	−8.1%	6.40	16.6	195.8/sq mi (75.6/km^{2})
Brookwood	City	Tuscaloosa County	2,504	1,828	+37.0%	8.36	21.7	299.5/sq mi (115.6/km^{2})
Brundidge	City	Pike County	2,073	2,076	−0.1%	9.75	25.3	212.6/sq mi (82.1/km^{2})
Butler†	Town	Choctaw County	1,871	1,894	−1.2%	5.57	14.4	335.9/sq mi (129.7/km^{2})
Calera	City	Shelby County; Chilton County	16,494	11,620	+41.9%	24.09	62.4	684.7/sq mi (264.4/km^{2})
Camden†	City	Wilcox County	1,927	2,020	−4.6%	4.18	10.8	461.0/sq mi (178.0/km^{2})
Camp Hill	Town	Tallapoosa County	1,006	1,014	−0.8%	8.99	23.3	111.9/sq mi (43.2/km^{2})
Carbon Hill	City	Walker County	1,769	2,021	−12.5%	5.50	14.2	321.6/sq mi (124.2/km^{2})
Cardiff	Town	Jefferson County	52	55	−5.5%	0.25	0.65	208.0/sq mi (80.3/km^{2})
Carolina	Town	Covington County	286	297	−3.7%	1.11	2.9	257.7/sq mi (99.5/km^{2})
Carrollton†	Town	Pickens County	1,023	1,019	+0.4%	2.06	5.3	496.6/sq mi (191.7/km^{2})
Castleberry	Town	Conecuh County	486	583	−16.6%	1.71	4.4	284.2/sq mi (109.7/km^{2})
Cedar Bluff	Town	Cherokee County	1,845	1,820	+1.4%	5.07	13.1	363.9/sq mi (140.5/km^{2})
Center Point	City	Jefferson County	16,406	16,921	−3.0%	6.12	15.9	2,680.7/sq mi (1,035.0/km^{2})
Centre†	City	Cherokee County	3,587	3,489	+2.8%	11.44	29.6	313.5/sq mi (121.1/km^{2})
Centreville†	City	Bibb County	2,800	2,778	+0.8%	9.45	24.5	296.3/sq mi (114.4/km^{2})
Chatom†	Town	Washington County	1,104	1,288	−14.3%	10.72	27.8	103.0/sq mi (39.8/km^{2})
Chelsea	City	Shelby County	14,982	10,183	+47.1%	21.35	55.3	701.7/sq mi (270.9/km^{2})
Cherokee	Town	Colbert County	970	1,048	−7.4%	2.22	5.7	436.9/sq mi (168.7/km^{2})
Cherokee Ridge (Note: Cherokee Ridge incorporated in 2021 and is thus not included in either the 2010 census nor 2020 censuses.)	Town	Marshall County						
Chickasaw	City	Mobile County	6,457	6,106	+5.7%	4.21	10.9	1,533.7/sq mi (592.2/km^{2})
Childersburg	City	Talladega County; Shelby County	4,754	5,175	−8.1%	12.35	32.0	384.9/sq mi (148.6/km^{2})
Citronelle	City	Mobile County	3,946	3,905	+1.0%	25.73	66.6	153.4/sq mi (59.2/km^{2})
Clanton†	City	Chilton County	8,768	8,619	+1.7%	21.94	56.8	399.6/sq mi (154.3/km^{2})
Clay	City	Jefferson County	10,291	9,708	+6.0%	9.93	25.7	1,036.4/sq mi (400.1/km^{2})
Clayhatchee	Town	Dale County	466	589	−20.9%	2.72	7.0	171.3/sq mi (66.1/km^{2})
Clayton†	Town	Barbour County	2,265	3,008	−24.7%	6.68	17.3	339.1/sq mi (130.9/km^{2})
Cleveland	Town	Blount County	1,245	1,303	−4.5%	7.84	20.3	158.8/sq mi (61.3/km^{2})
Clio	City	Barbour County	1,220	1,399	−12.8%	10.07	26.1	121.2/sq mi (46.8/km^{2})
Coaling	Town	Tuscaloosa County	2,035	1,657	+22.8%	5.02	13.0	405.4/sq mi (156.5/km^{2})
Coffee Springs	Town	Geneva County	206	228	−9.6%	0.78	2.0	264.1/sq mi (102.0/km^{2})
Coffeeville	Town	Clarke County	263	352	−25.3%	4.52	11.7	58.2/sq mi (22.5/km^{2})
Coker	Town	Tuscaloosa County	904	979	−7.7%	2.03	5.3	445.3/sq mi (171.9/km^{2})
Collinsville	Town	DeKalb County; Cherokee County	2,059	1,983	+3.8%	3.92	10.2	525.3/sq mi (202.8/km^{2})
Colony	Town	Cullman County	264	268	−1.5%	2.25	5.8	117.3/sq mi (45.3/km^{2})
Columbia	Town	Houston County	690	740	−6.8%	3.93	10.2	175.6/sq mi (67.8/km^{2})
Columbiana†	City	Shelby County	4,462	4,197	+6.3%	16.09	41.7	277.3/sq mi (107.1/km^{2})
Coosada	Town	Elmore County	1,217	1,224	−0.6%	7.08	18.3	171.9/sq mi (66.4/km^{2})
Cordova	City	Walker County	1,728	2,095	−17.5%	5.83	15.1	296.4/sq mi (114.4/km^{2})
Cottonwood	Town	Houston County	1,048	1,289	−18.7%	5.77	14.9	181.6/sq mi (70.1/km^{2})
County Line	Town	Blount County; Jefferson County	311	258	+20.5%	0.97	2.5	320.6/sq mi (123.8/km^{2})
Courtland	Town	Lawrence County	583	609	−4.3%	2.92	7.6	199.7/sq mi (77.1/km^{2})
Cowarts	Town	Houston County	1,930	1,871	+3.2%	7.25	18.8	266.2/sq mi (102.8/km^{2})
Creola	City	Mobile County	1,936	1,926	+0.5%	14.24	36.9	136.0/sq mi (52.5/km^{2})
Crossville	Town	DeKalb County	1,830	1,862	−1.7%	8.37	21.7	218.6/sq mi (84.4/km^{2})
Cuba	Town	Sumter County	306	346	−11.6%	4.06	10.5	75.4/sq mi (29.1/km^{2})
Cullman†	City	Cullman County	18,213	14,775	+23.3%	19.38	50.2	939.8/sq mi (362.9/km^{2})
Cusseta	Town	Chambers County	152	123	+23.6%	2.62	6.8	58.0/sq mi (22.4/km^{2})
Dadeville†	City	Tallapoosa County	3,084	3,230	−4.5%	15.94	41.3	193.5/sq mi (74.7/km^{2})
Daleville	City	Dale County	4,866	5,295	−8.1%	14.09	36.5	345.4/sq mi (133.3/km^{2})
Daphne	City	Baldwin County	27,462	21,570	+27.3%	16.24	42.1	1,691.0/sq mi (652.9/km^{2})
Dauphin Island	Town	Mobile County	1,778	1,238	+43.6%	6.35	16.4	280.0/sq mi (108.1/km^{2})
Daviston	Town	Tallapoosa County	174	214	−18.7%	9.14	23.7	19.0/sq mi (7.4/km^{2})
Dayton	Town	Marengo County	28	52	−46.2%	1.00	2.6	28.0/sq mi (10.8/km^{2})
Deatsville	Town	Elmore County	1,679	1,154	+45.5%	4.66	12.1	360.3/sq mi (139.1/km^{2})
Decatur†	City	Morgan County; Limestone County	57,938	55,683	+4.0%	53.67	139.0	1,079.5/sq mi (416.8/km^{2})
Demopolis	City	Marengo County	7,162	7,483	−4.3%	17.74	45.9	403.7/sq mi (155.9/km^{2})
Detroit	Town	Lamar County	230	237	−3.0%	1.33	3.4	172.9/sq mi (66.8/km^{2})
Dodge City	Town	Cullman County	548	593	−7.6%	3.44	8.9	159.3/sq mi (61.5/km^{2})
Dora	City	Walker County	2,297	2,025	+13.4%	7.51	19.5	305.9/sq mi (118.1/km^{2})
Dothan†	City	Houston County; Dale County; Henry County	71,072	65,496	+8.5%	89.40	231.5	795.0/sq mi (306.9/km^{2})
Double Springs†	Town	Winston County	1,119	1,083	+3.3%	4.11	10.6	272.3/sq mi (105.1/km^{2})
Douglas	Town	Marshall County	761	744	+2.3%	3.40	8.8	223.8/sq mi (86.4/km^{2})
Dozier	Town	Crenshaw County	285	329	−13.4%	2.96	7.7	96.3/sq mi (37.2/km^{2})
Dutton	Town	Jackson County	330	315	+4.8%	0.86	2.2	383.7/sq mi (148.2/km^{2})
East Brewton	City	Escambia County	2,293	2,478	−7.5%	3.41	8.8	672.4/sq mi (259.6/km^{2})
Eclectic	Town	Elmore County	1,193	1,001	+19.2%	4.21	10.9	283.4/sq mi (109.4/km^{2})
Edwardsville	Town	Cleburne County	206	202	+2.0%	16.44	42.6	12.5/sq mi (4.8/km^{2})
Elba†	City	Coffee County	3,508	3,940	−11.0%	15.34	39.7	228.7/sq mi (88.3/km^{2})
Elberta	Town	Baldwin County	1,974	1,498	+31.8%	6.76	17.5	292.0/sq mi (112.7/km^{2})
Eldridge	Town	Walker County	136	130	+4.6%	0.70	1.8	194.3/sq mi (75.0/km^{2})
Elkmont	Town	Limestone County	411	434	−5.3%	1.63	4.2	252.1/sq mi (97.4/km^{2})
Elmore	Town	Elmore County	1,280	1,262	+1.4%	3.95	10.2	324.1/sq mi (125.1/km^{2})
Emelle	Town	Sumter County	32	53	−39.6%	0.21	0.54	152.4/sq mi (58.8/km^{2})
Enterprise	City	Coffee County; Dale County	28,711	26,562	+8.1%	31.24	80.9	919.0/sq mi (354.8/km^{2})
Epes	Town	Sumter County	272	192	+41.7%	1.92	5.0	141.7/sq mi (54.7/km^{2})
Ethelsville	Town	Pickens County	49	81	−39.5%	0.57	1.5	86.0/sq mi (33.2/km^{2})
Eufaula	City	Barbour County	12,882	13,137	−1.9%	59.39	153.8	216.9/sq mi (83.7/km^{2})
Eutaw†	City	Greene County	2,937	2,934	+0.1%	11.93	30.9	246.2/sq mi (95.1/km^{2})
Eva	Town	Morgan County	589	519	+13.5%	4.07	10.5	144.7/sq mi (55.9/km^{2})
Evergreen†	City	Conecuh County	3,520	3,944	−10.8%	15.60	40.4	225.6/sq mi (87.1/km^{2})
Excel	Town	Monroe County	557	723	−23.0%	1.65	4.3	337.6/sq mi (130.3/km^{2})
Fairfield	City	Jefferson County	10,000	11,117	−10.0%	3.47	9.0	2,881.8/sq mi (1,112.7/km^{2})
Fairhope	City	Baldwin County	22,477	15,326	+46.7%	12.06	31.2	1,863.8/sq mi (719.6/km^{2})
Fairview	Town	Cullman County	543	446	+21.7%	2.71	7.0	200.4/sq mi (77.4/km^{2})
Falkville	Town	Morgan County	1,197	1,279	−6.4%	3.78	9.8	316.7/sq mi (122.3/km^{2})
Faunsdale	Town	Marengo County	90	98	−8.2%	0.28	0.73	321.4/sq mi (124.1/km^{2})
Fayette†	City	Fayette County	4,285	4,619	−7.2%	8.55	22.1	501.2/sq mi (193.5/km^{2})
Five Points	Town	Chambers County	114	141	−19.1%	1.03	2.7	110.7/sq mi (42.7/km^{2})
Flomaton	Town	Escambia County	1,466	1,440	+1.8%	5.09	13.2	288.0/sq mi (111.2/km^{2})
Florala	Town	Covington County	1,923	1,980	−2.9%	10.53	27.3	182.6/sq mi (70.5/km^{2})
Florence†	City	Lauderdale County	40,184	39,319	+2.2%	26.00	67.3	1,545.5/sq mi (596.7/km^{2})
Foley	City	Baldwin County	20,335	14,618	+39.1%	25.77	66.7	789.1/sq mi (304.7/km^{2})
Forkland	Town	Greene County	445	649	−31.4%	3.49	9.0	127.5/sq mi (49.2/km^{2})
Fort Deposit	Town	Lowndes County	1,225	1,344	−8.9%	5.66	14.7	216.4/sq mi (83.6/km^{2})
Fort Payne†	City	DeKalb County	14,877	14,012	+6.2%	55.49	143.7	268.1/sq mi (103.5/km^{2})
Franklin	Town	Macon County	590	149	+296.0%	4.47	11.6	132.0/sq mi (51.0/km^{2})
Frisco City	Town	Monroe County	1,170	1,309	−10.6%	4.03	10.4	290.3/sq mi (112.1/km^{2})
Fruithurst	Town	Cleburne County	235	284	−17.3%	1.00	2.6	235.0/sq mi (90.7/km^{2})
Fulton	Town	Clarke County	223	272	−18.0%	2.45	6.3	91.0/sq mi (35.1/km^{2})
Fultondale	City	Jefferson County	9,876	8,380	+17.9%	12.20	31.6	809.5/sq mi (312.6/km^{2})
Fyffe	Town	DeKalb County	967	1,018	−5.0%	4.41	11.4	219.3/sq mi (84.7/km^{2})
Gadsden†	City	Etowah County	33,945	36,856	−7.9%	37.16	96.2	913.5/sq mi (352.7/km^{2})
Gainesville	Town	Sumter County	172	208	−17.3%	1.72	4.5	100.0/sq mi (38.6/km^{2})
Gantt	Town	Covington County	196	222	−11.7%	0.65	1.7	301.5/sq mi (116.4/km^{2})
Garden City	Town	Cullman County; Blount County	528	492	+7.3%	3.01	7.8	175.4/sq mi (67.7/km^{2})
Gardendale	City	Jefferson County	16,044	13,893	+15.5%	22.55	58.4	711.5/sq mi (274.7/km^{2})
Gaylesville	Town	Cherokee County	170	144	+18.1%	0.34	0.88	500.0/sq mi (193.1/km^{2})
Geiger	Town	Sumter County	155	170	−8.8%	0.95	2.5	163.2/sq mi (63.0/km^{2})
Geneva†	City	Geneva County	4,245	4,452	−4.6%	15.87	41.1	267.5/sq mi (103.3/km^{2})
Georgiana	Town	Butler County	1,324	1,738	−23.8%	6.24	16.2	212.2/sq mi (81.9/km^{2})
Geraldine	Town	DeKalb County	910	896	+1.6%	3.92	10.2	232.1/sq mi (89.6/km^{2})
Gilbertown	Town	Choctaw County	739	215	+243.7%	0.78	2.0	947.4/sq mi (365.8/km^{2})
Glen Allen	Town	Fayette County; Marion County	433	510	−15.1%	6.55	17.0	66.1/sq mi (25.5/km^{2})
Glencoe	City	Etowah County; Calhoun County	5,372	5,160	+4.1%	16.93	43.8	317.3/sq mi (122.5/km^{2})
Glenwood	Town	Crenshaw County	152	187	−18.7%	0.73	1.9	208.2/sq mi (80.4/km^{2})
Goldville	Town	Tallapoosa County	52	55	−5.5%	0.99	2.6	52.5/sq mi (20.3/km^{2})
Good Hope	City	Cullman County	2,483	2,264	+9.7%	7.94	20.6	312.7/sq mi (120.7/km^{2})
Goodwater	Town	Coosa County	1,291	1,475	−12.5%	6.49	16.8	198.9/sq mi (76.8/km^{2})
Gordo	Town	Pickens County	1,628	1,750	−7.0%	3.25	8.4	500.9/sq mi (193.4/km^{2})
Gordon	Town	Houston County	294	332	−11.4%	3.20	8.3	91.9/sq mi (35.5/km^{2})
Gordonville	Town	Lowndes County	245	326	−24.8%	5.54	14.3	44.2/sq mi (17.1/km^{2})
Goshen	Town	Pike County	269	266	+1.1%	2.56	6.6	105.1/sq mi (40.6/km^{2})
Grant	Town	Marshall County	1,039	896	+16.0%	1.78	4.6	583.7/sq mi (225.4/km^{2})
Graysville	City	Jefferson County	1,950	2,165	−9.9%	16.92	43.8	115.2/sq mi (44.5/km^{2})
Greensboro†	City	Hale County	2,218	2,497	−11.2%	2.38	6.2	931.9/sq mi (359.8/km^{2})
Greenville†	City	Butler County	7,374	8,135	−9.4%	21.36	55.3	345.2/sq mi (133.3/km^{2})
Grimes	Town	Dale County	573	558	+2.7%	1.25	3.2	458.4/sq mi (177.0/km^{2})
Grove Hill†	Town	Clarke County	1,818	1,570	+15.8%	4.97	12.9	365.8/sq mi (141.2/km^{2})
Guin	City	Marion County	2,195	2,376	−7.6%	14.96	38.7	146.7/sq mi (56.7/km^{2})
Gulf Shores	City	Baldwin County	15,014	9,741	+54.1%	23.16	60.0	648.3/sq mi (250.3/km^{2})
Guntersville†	City	Marshall County	8,553	8,197	+4.3%	25.39	65.8	336.9/sq mi (130.1/km^{2})
Gurley	Town	Madison County	816	801	+1.9%	3.52	9.1	231.8/sq mi (89.5/km^{2})
Gu-Win	Town	Marion County; Fayette County	141	176	−19.9%	1.94	5.0	72.7/sq mi (28.1/km^{2})
Hackleburg	Town	Marion County	1,425	1,516	−6.0%	15.27	39.5	93.3/sq mi (36.0/km^{2})
Haleburg	Town	Henry County	112	103	+8.7%	3.84	9.9	29.2/sq mi (11.3/km^{2})
Haleyville	City	Winston County; Marion County	4,361	4,173	+4.5%	8.29	21.5	526.1/sq mi (203.1/km^{2})
Hamilton†	City	Marion County	7,042	6,885	+2.3%	38.06	98.6	185.0/sq mi (71.4/km^{2})
Hammondville	Town	DeKalb County	425	488	−12.9%	4.90	12.7	86.7/sq mi (33.5/km^{2})
Hanceville	City	Cullman County	3,217	2,982	+7.9%	4.21	10.9	764.1/sq mi (295.0/km^{2})
Harpersville	Town	Shelby County	1,614	1,637	−1.4%	20.73	53.7	77.9/sq mi (30.1/km^{2})
Hartford	City	Geneva County	2,651	2,624	+1.0%	6.24	16.2	424.8/sq mi (164.0/km^{2})
Hartselle	City	Morgan County	15,455	14,255	+8.4%	16.26	42.1	950.5/sq mi (367.0/km^{2})
Hayden	Town	Blount County	1,342	444	+202.3%	1.12	2.9	1,198.2/sq mi (462.6/km^{2})
Hayneville†	Town	Lowndes County	830	932	−10.9%	1.86	4.8	446.2/sq mi (172.3/km^{2})
Headland	City	Henry County	4,973	4,510	+10.3%	30.28	78.4	164.2/sq mi (63.4/km^{2})
Heath	Town	Covington County	236	254	−7.1%	0.89	2.3	265.2/sq mi (102.4/km^{2})
Heflin†	City	Cleburne County	3,431	3,480	−1.4%	16.05	41.6	213.8/sq mi (82.5/km^{2})
Helena	City	Shelby County; Jefferson County	20,914	16,793	+24.5%	20.35	52.7	1,027.7/sq mi (396.8/km^{2})
Henagar	City	DeKalb County	2,292	2,344	−2.2%	22.27	57.7	102.9/sq mi (39.7/km^{2})
Highland Lake	Town	Blount County	412	412	0.0%	1.63	4.2	252.8/sq mi (97.6/km^{2})
Hillsboro	Town	Lawrence County	407	552	−26.3%	1.88	4.9	216.5/sq mi (83.6/km^{2})
Hobson City	Town	Calhoun County	759	771	−1.6%	1.04	2.7	729.8/sq mi (281.8/km^{2})
Hodges	Town	Franklin County	265	288	−8.0%	4.14	10.7	64.0/sq mi (24.7/km^{2})
Hokes Bluff	City	Etowah County	4,446	4,286	+3.7%	11.94	30.9	372.4/sq mi (143.8/km^{2})
Holly Pond	Town	Cullman County	851	798	+6.6%	4.44	11.5	191.7/sq mi (74.0/km^{2})
Hollywood	Town	Jackson County	914	1,000	−8.6%	8.92	23.1	102.5/sq mi (39.6/km^{2})
Homewood	City	Jefferson County	26,414	25,167	+5.0%	8.36	21.7	3,159.6/sq mi (1,219.9/km^{2})
Hoover	City	Jefferson County; Shelby County	92,606	81,619	+13.5%	47.16	122.1	1,963.7/sq mi (758.2/km^{2})
Horn Hill	Town	Covington County	207	228	−9.2%	2.56	6.6	80.9/sq mi (31.2/km^{2})
Hueytown	City	Jefferson County	16,776	16,105	+4.2%	19.45	50.4	862.5/sq mi (333.0/km^{2})
Huntsville†	City	Madison County; Limestone County; Morgan County	215,006	180,105	+19.4%	209.05	541.4	1,028.5/sq mi (397.1/km^{2})
Hurtsboro	Town	Russell County	349	553	−36.9%	1.03	2.7	338.8/sq mi (130.8/km^{2})
Hytop	Town	Jackson County	441	354	+24.6%	2.27	5.9	194.3/sq mi (75.0/km^{2})
Ider	Town	DeKalb County	735	723	+1.7%	5.44	14.1	135.1/sq mi (52.2/km^{2})
Indian Springs Village	Town	Shelby County	2,481	2,363	+5.0%	3.80	9.8	652.9/sq mi (252.1/km^{2})
Irondale	City	Jefferson County	13,497	12,349	+9.3%	17.31	44.8	779.7/sq mi (301.1/km^{2})
Jackson	City	Clarke County	4,748	5,228	−9.2%	15.64	40.5	303.6/sq mi (117.2/km^{2})
Jackson's Gap	Town	Tallapoosa County	747	829	−9.9%	8.52	22.1	87.7/sq mi (33.9/km^{2})
Jacksonville	City	Calhoun County	14,385	12,548	+14.6%	9.84	25.5	1,461.9/sq mi (564.4/km^{2})
Jasper†	City	Walker County	14,572	13,857	+5.2%	28.46	73.7	512.0/sq mi (197.7/km^{2})
Jemison	City	Chilton County	2,642	2,585	+2.2%	11.19	29.0	236.1/sq mi (91.2/km^{2})
Kansas	Town	Walker County	180	226	−20.4%	1.02	2.6	176.5/sq mi (68.1/km^{2})
Kellyton	Town	Coosa County	129	217	−40.6%	0.96	2.5	134.4/sq mi (51.9/km^{2})
Kennedy	Town	Lamar County	435	447	−2.7%=	3.07	8.0	141.7/sq mi (54.7/km^{2})
Killen	Town	Lauderdale County	1,034	1,108	−6.7%	1.97	5.1	524.9/sq mi (202.7/km^{2})
Kimberly	City	Jefferson County	3,841	2,711	+41.7%	5.85	15.2	656.6/sq mi (253.5/km^{2})
Kinsey	Town	Houston County	2,203	2,198	+0.2%	12.10	31.3	182.1/sq mi (70.3/km^{2})
Kinston	Town	Coffee County	580	540	+7.4%	4.89	12.7	118.6/sq mi (45.8/km^{2})
LaFayette†	City	Chambers County	2,684	3,003	−10.6%	8.86	22.9	302.9/sq mi (117.0/km^{2})
Lake View	City	Tuscaloosa County	3,560	1,943	+83.2%	1.60	4.1	2,225.0/sq mi (859.1/km^{2})
Lakeview	Town	DeKalb County	161	143	+12.6%	0.63	1.6	255.6/sq mi (98.7/km^{2})
Lanett	City	Chambers County	6,970	6,468	+7.8%	6.22	16.1	1,120.6/sq mi (432.7/km^{2})
Langston	Town	Jackson County	265	270	−1.9%	4.93	12.8	53.8/sq mi (20.8/km^{2})
Leeds	City	Jefferson County; St. Clair County; Shelby County	12,324	11,773	+4.7%	22.86	59.2	539.1/sq mi (208.2/km^{2})
Leesburg	Town	Cherokee County	911	1,027	−11.3%	6.42	16.6	141.9/sq mi (54.8/km^{2})
Leighton	Town	Colbert County	665	729	−8.8%	0.99	2.6	671.7/sq mi (259.4/km^{2})
Lester	Town	Limestone County	111	111	0.0%	1.83	4.7	60.7/sq mi (23.4/km^{2})
Level Plains	Town	Dale County	1,825	2,085	−12.5%	3.06	7.9	596.4/sq mi (230.3/km^{2})
Lexington	Town	Lauderdale County	727	735	−1.1%	3.24	8.4	224.4/sq mi (86.6/km^{2})
Libertyville	Town	Covington County	108	117	−7.7%	0.52	1.3	207.7/sq mi (80.2/km^{2})
Lincoln	City	Talladega County	6,845	6,266	+9.2%	25.10	65.0	272.7/sq mi (105.3/km^{2})
Linden†	City	Marengo County	1,930	2,123	−9.1%	3.58	9.3	539.1/sq mi (208.2/km^{2})
Lineville	City	Clay County	2,489	2,395	+3.9%	8.94	23.2	278.4/sq mi (107.5/km^{2})
Lipscomb	City	Jefferson County	2,086	2,210	−5.6%	1.17	3.0	1,782.9/sq mi (688.4/km^{2})
Lisman	Town	Choctaw County	427	539	−20.8%	2.59	6.7	164.9/sq mi (63.7/km^{2})
Littleville	Town	Colbert County	1,038	1,011	+2.7%	4.97	12.9	208.9/sq mi (80.6/km^{2})
Livingston†	City	Sumter County	3,436	3,485	−1.4%	7.13	18.5	481.9/sq mi (186.1/km^{2})
Loachapoka	Town	Lee County	160	180	−11.1%	1.14	3.0)	140.4/sq mi (54.2/km^{2})
Lockhart	Town	Covington County	445	516	−13.8%	1.09	2.8	408.3/sq mi (157.6/km^{2})
Locust Fork	Town	Blount County	1,192	1,186	+0.5%	3.85	10.0	309.6/sq mi (119.5/km^{2})
Louisville	Town	Barbour County	395	519	−23.9%	2.75	7.1	143.6/sq mi (55.5/km^{2})
Lowndesboro	Town	Lowndes County	89	115	−22.6%	0.79	2.0	112.7/sq mi (43.5/km^{2})
Loxley	City	Baldwin County	3,710	1,632	+127.3%	31.85	82.5	116.5/sq mi (45.0/km^{2})
Luverne†	City	Crenshaw County	2,765	2,800	−1.2%	15.65	40.5	176.7/sq mi (68.2/km^{2})
Lynn	Town	Winston County	610	659	−7.4%	10.65	27.6	57.3/sq mi (22.1/km^{2})
Madison	City	Madison County; Limestone County	56,933	42,938	+32.6%	29.59	76.6	1,924.1/sq mi (742.9/km^{2})
Madrid	Town	Houston County	265	350	−24.3%	1.94	5.0	136.6/sq mi (52.7/km^{2})
Magnolia Springs	Town	Baldwin County	811	723	+12.2%	0.90	2.3	901.1/sq mi (347.9/km^{2})
Malvern	Town	Geneva County	1,536	1,448	+6.1%	14.02	36.3	109.6/sq mi (42.3/km^{2})
Maplesville	Town	Chilton County	637	708	−10.0%	3.27	8.5	194.8/sq mi (75.2/km^{2})
Margaret	City	St. Clair County	5,106	4,428	+15.3%	9.82	25.4	520.0/sq mi (200.8/km^{2})
Marion†	City	Perry County	3,176	3,686	−13.8%	10.57	27.4	300.5/sq mi (116.0/km^{2})
Maytown	Town	Jefferson County	316	385	−17.9%	2.68	6.9	117.9/sq mi (45.5/km^{2})
McIntosh	Town	Washington County	206	238	−13.4%	1.00	2.6	206.0/sq mi (79.5/km^{2})
McKenzie	Town	Butler County; Conecuh County	507	530	−4.3%	3.72	9.6	136.3/sq mi (52.6/km^{2})
McMullen	Town	Pickens County	32	10	+220.0%	0.11	0.28	290.9/sq mi (112.3/km^{2})
Memphis	Town	Pickens County	29	29	0.0%	0.39	1.0	74.4/sq mi (28.7/km^{2})
Mentone	Town	DeKalb County	319	360	−11.4%	4.67	12.1	68.3/sq mi (26.4/km^{2})
Midfield	City	Jefferson County	5,211	5,365	−2.9%	2.65	6.9	1,966.4/sq mi (759.2/km^{2})
Midland City	Town	Dale County	2,239	2,344	−4.5%	6.08	15.7	368.3/sq mi (142.2/km^{2})
Midway	Town	Bullock County	421	499	−15.6%	3.31	8.6	127.2/sq mi (49.1/km^{2})
Millbrook	City	Elmore County; Autauga County	16,564	14,640	+13.1%	12.81	33.2	1,293.1/sq mi (499.3/km^{2})
Millport	Town	Lamar County	1,010	1,049	−3.7%	5.49	14.2	184.0/sq mi (71.0/km^{2})
Millry	Town	Washington County	450	546	−17.6%	7.49	19.4	60.1/sq mi (23.2/km^{2})
Mobile† (Note: Mobile annexed neighboring areas on July 18, 2023 increasing the area to 180.07 square miles (466.4 km^{2}).)	City	Mobile County	187,041	195,111	−4.1%	117.90	305.4	1,586.4/sq mi (612.5/km^{2})
Monroeville†	City	Monroe County	5,951	6,519	−8.7%	13.37	34.6	445.1/sq mi (171.9/km^{2})
Montevallo	City	Shelby County	7,229	6,323	+14.3%	12.59	32.6	574.2/sq mi (221.7/km^{2})
Montgomery‡	City	Montgomery County	200,603	205,764	−2.5%	159.57	413.3	1,257.1/sq mi (485.4/km^{2})
Moody	City	St. Clair County	13,170	11,726	+12.3%	24.40	63.2	539.8/sq mi (208.4/km^{2})
Mooresville	Town	Limestone County	47	53	−11.3%	0.12	0.31	391.7/sq mi (151.2/km^{2})
Morris	Town	Jefferson County	2,259	1,859	+21.5%	3.03	7.8	745.5/sq mi (287.9/km^{2})
Mosses	Town	Lowndes County	834	1,029	−19.0%	4.74	12.3	175.9/sq mi (67.9/km^{2})
Moulton†	City	Lawrence County	3,398	3,471	−2.1%	5.99	15.5	567.3/sq mi (219.0/km^{2})
Moundville	City	Hale County; Tuscaloosa County	3,024	2,427	+24.6%	4.59	11.9	658.8/sq mi (254.4/km^{2})
Mount Vernon	Town	Mobile County	1,354	1,574	−14.0%	5.22	13.5	259.4/sq mi (100.1/km^{2})
Mountain Brook	City	Jefferson County	22,461	20,413	+10.0%	12.79	33.1	1,756.1/sq mi (678.0/km^{2})
Mulga	Town	Jefferson County	784	836	−6.2%	0.62	1.6	1,264.5/sq mi (488.2/km^{2})
Munford	Town	Talladega County	1,351	1,292	+4.6%	2.21	5.7	611.3/sq mi (236.0/km^{2})
Muscle Shoals	City	Colbert County	16,275	13,146	+23.8%	15.53	40.2	1,048.0/sq mi (404.6/km^{2})
Myrtlewood	Town	Marengo County	70	130	−46.2%	2.59	6.7	27.0/sq mi (10.4/km^{2})
Napier Field	Town	Dale County	409	354	+15.5%	0.26	0.67	1,573.1/sq mi (607.4/km^{2})
Natural Bridge	Town	Winston County	32	37	−13.5%	0.43	1.1	74.4/sq mi (28.7/km^{2})
Nauvoo	Town	Walker County; Winston County	185	221	−16.3%	0.99	2.6	186.9/sq mi (72.2/km^{2})
Nectar	Town	Blount County	379	345	+9.9%	1.81	4.7	209.4/sq mi (80.8/km^{2})
Needham	Town	Choctaw County	73	94	−22.3%	0.57	1.5	128.1/sq mi (49.4/km^{2})
New Brockton	Town	Coffee County	1,428	1,146	+24.6%	7.99	20.7	178.7/sq mi (69.0/km^{2})
New Hope	City	Madison County	2,889	2,810	+2.8%	8.66	22.4	333.6/sq mi (128.8/km^{2})
New Site	Town	Tallapoosa County	773	773	0.0%	9.87	25.6	78.3/sq mi (30.2/km^{2})
Newbern	Town	Hale County	133	186	−28.5%	1.16	3.0	114.7/sq mi (44.3/km^{2})
Newton	Town	Dale County	1,607	1,511	+6.4%	14.25	36.9	112.8/sq mi (43.5/km^{2})
Newville	Town	Henry County	544	539	+0.9%	4.02	10.4	135.3/sq mi (52.2/km^{2})
North Courtland	Town	Lawrence County	483	632	−23.6%	0.65	1.7	743.1/sq mi (286.9/km^{2})
North Johns	Town	Jefferson County	127	145	−12.4%	0.20	0.52	635.0/sq mi (245.2/km^{2})
Northport	City	Tuscaloosa County	31,125	23,330	+33.4%	16.75	43.4	1,858.2/sq mi (717.5/km^{2})
Notasulga	Town	Macon County; Lee County	914	965	−5.3%	13.81	35.8	66.2/sq mi (25.6/km^{2})
Oak Grove	Town	Talladega County	564	528	+6.8%	1.78	4.6	316.9/sq mi (122.3/km^{2})
Oak Hill	Town	Wilcox County	14	26	−46.2%	0.56	1.5	25.0/sq mi (9.7/km^{2})
Oakman	Town	Walker County	771	789	−2.3%	3.08	8.0	250.3/sq mi (96.7/km^{2})
Odenville	City	St. Clair County	4,969	3,585	+38.6%	13.56	35.1	366.4/sq mi (141.5/km^{2})
Ohatchee	Town	Calhoun County	1,157	1,170	−1.1%	5.90	15.3	196.1/sq mi (75.7/km^{2})
Oneonta†	City	Blount County	6,938	6,567	+5.6%	15.17	39.3	457.4/sq mi (176.6/km^{2})
Onycha	Town	Covington County	167	184	−9.2%	0.79	2.0	211.4/sq mi (81.6/km^{2})
Opelika†	City	Lee County	30,995	26,477	+17.1%	59.59	154.3	520.1/sq mi (200.8/km^{2})
Opp	City	Covington County	6,771	6,659	+1.7%	23.66	61.3	286.2/sq mi (110.5/km^{2})
Orange Beach	City	Baldwin County	8,095	5,441	+48.8%	14.70	38.1	550.7/sq mi (212.6/km^{2})
Orrville	Town	Dallas County	150	204	−26.5%	1.04	2.7	144.2/sq mi (55.7/km^{2})
Owens Cross Roads	City	Madison County	2,594	1,521	+70.5%	8.30	21.5	312.5/sq mi (120.7/km^{2})
Oxford	City	Calhoun County; Talladega County	22,069	21,348	+3.4%	30.67	79.4	719.6/sq mi (277.8/km^{2})
Ozark†	City	Dale County	14,368	14,907	−3.6%	34.09	88.3	421.5/sq mi (162.7/km^{2})
Paint Rock	Town	Jackson County	182	210	−13.3%	0.43	1.1	423.3/sq mi (163.4/km^{2})
Parrish	Town	Walker County	982	982	0.0%	2.09	5.4	469.9/sq mi (181.4/km^{2})
Pelham	City	Shelby County	24,318	21,352	+13.9%	39.02	101.1	623.2/sq mi (240.6/km^{2})
Pell City†	City	St. Clair County	12,939	12,695	+1.9%	24.75	64.1	522.8/sq mi (201.8/km^{2})
Pennington	Town	Choctaw County	329	221	+48.9%	1.96	5.1	167.9/sq mi (64.8/km^{2})
Perdido Beach	Town	Baldwin County	555	581	−4.5%	1.24	3.2	447.6/sq mi (172.8/km^{2})
Petrey	Town	Crenshaw County	67	58	+15.5%	0.73	1.9	91.8/sq mi (35.4/km^{2})
Phenix City†	City	Russell County; Lee County	38,816	32,822	+18.3%	27.75	71.9	1,398.8/sq mi (540.1/km^{2})
Phil Campbell	Town	Franklin County	992	1,148	−13.6%	4.07	10.5	243.7/sq mi (94.1/km^{2})
Pickensville	Town	Pickens County	557	608	−8.4%	7.73	20.0	72.1/sq mi (27.8/km^{2})
Piedmont	City	Calhoun County; Cherokee County	4,787	4,878	−1.9%	9.81	25.4	488.0/sq mi (188.4/km^{2})
Pike Road	Town	Montgomery County	9,439	5,406	+74.6%	31.64	81.9	298.3/sq mi (115.2/km^{2})
Pinckard	Town	Dale County	582	647	−10.0%	5.33	13.8	109.2/sq mi (42.2/km^{2})
Pine Apple	Town	Wilcox County	143	132	+8.3%	3.10	8.0	46.1/sq mi (17.8/km^{2})
Pine Hill	Town	Wilcox County	758	975	−22.3%	3.82	9.9	198.4/sq mi (76.6/km^{2})
Pine Level (Note: Pine Level incorporated in 2023 and is thus not included in either the 2010 nor the 2020 census.)	Town	Autauga County						
Pine Ridge	Town	DeKalb County	263	282	−6.7%	1.30	3.4	202.3/sq mi (78.1/km^{2})
Pinson	City	Jefferson County	7,215	7,163	+0.7%	10.10	26.2	714.4/sq mi (275.8/km^{2})
Pisgah	Town	Jackson County	681	722	−5.7%	4.80	12.4	141.9/sq mi (54.8/km^{2})
Pleasant Grove	City	Jefferson County	9,544	10,110	−5.6%	9.89	25.6	965.0/sq mi (372.6/km^{2})
Pleasant Groves	Town	Jackson County	426	420	+1.4%	3.65	9.5	116.7/sq mi (45.1/km^{2})
Pollard	Town	Escambia County	128	137	−6.6%	1.11	2.9	115.3/sq mi (44.5/km^{2})
Powell	Town	DeKalb County	901	955	−5.7%	4.96	12.8	181.7/sq mi (70.1/km^{2})
Prattville†	City	Autauga County; Elmore County	37,781	33,960	+11.3%	32.86	85.1	1,149.8/sq mi (443.9/km^{2})
Priceville	City	Morgan County	3,512	2,658	+32.1%	5.23	13.5	671.5/sq mi (259.3/km^{2})
Prichard	City	Mobile County	19,322	22,659	−14.7%	25.29	65.5	764.0/sq mi (295.0/km^{2})
Providence	Town	Marengo County	167	223	−25.1%	1.75	4.5	95.4/sq mi (36.8/km^{2})
Ragland	Town	St. Clair County	1,693	1,639	+3.3%	16.83	43.6	100.6/sq mi (38.8/km^{2})
Rainbow City	City	Etowah County	10,191	9,602	+6.1%	25.46	65.9	400.3/sq mi (154.5/km^{2})
Rainsville	City	DeKalb County	5,505	4,948	+11.3%	20.56	53.3	267.8/sq mi (103.4/km^{2})
Ranburne	Town	Cleburne County	422	409	+3.2%	1.59	4.1	265.4/sq mi (102.5/km^{2})
Red Bay	City	Franklin County	3,232	3,158	+2.3%	9.74	25.2	331.8/sq mi (128.1/km^{2})
Red Level	Town	Covington County	432	487	−11.3%	1.92	5.0	225.0/sq mi (86.9/km^{2})
Reece City	Town	Etowah County	615	653	−5.8%	3.56	9.2	172.8/sq mi (66.7/km^{2})
Reform	City	Pickens County	1,520	1,702	−10.7%	8.01	20.7	189.8/sq mi (73.3/km^{2})
Rehobeth	Town	Houston County	1,791	1,297	+38.1%	7.58	19.6	236.3/sq mi (91.2/km^{2})
Repton	Town	Conecuh County	235	282	−16.7%	0.96	2.5	244.8/sq mi (94.5/km^{2})
Ridgeville	Town	Etowah County	83	112	−25.9%	0.82	2.1	101.2/sq mi (39.1/km^{2})
River Falls	Town	Covington County	479	526	−8.9%	6.84	17.7	70.0/sq mi (27.0/km^{2})
Riverside	City	St. Clair County	2,227	2,208	+0.9%	8.67	22.5	256.9/sq mi (99.2/km^{2})
Riverview	Town	Escambia County	163	184	−11.4%	1.45	3.8	112.4/sq mi (43.4/km^{2})
Roanoke	City	Randolph County	5,311	6,074	−12.6%	18.73	48.5	283.6/sq mi (109.5/km^{2})
Robertsdale	City	Baldwin County	6,708	5,276	+27.1%	5.45	14.1	1,230.8/sq mi (475.2/km^{2})
Rockford†	Town	Coosa County	349	477	−26.8%	3.31	8.6	105.4/sq mi (40.7/km^{2})
Rogersville	Town	Lauderdale County	1,286	1,257	+2.3%	3.03	7.8	424.4/sq mi (163.9/km^{2})
Rosa	Town	Blount County	376	316	+19.0%	3.77	9.8	99.7/sq mi (38.5/km^{2})
Russellville†	City	Franklin County	10,855	9,830	+10.4%	13.40	34.7	810.1/sq mi (312.8/km^{2})
Rutledge	Town	Crenshaw County	351	467	−24.8%	5.86	15.2	59.9/sq mi (23.1/km^{2})
St. Florian	Town	Lauderdale County	584	413	+41.4%	3.67	9.5	159.1/sq mi (61.4/km^{2})
Samson	City	Geneva County	1,874	1,940	−3.4%	3.62	9.4	517.7/sq mi (199.9/km^{2})
Sand Rock	Town	Cherokee County; DeKalb County	591	560	+5.5%	4.36	11.3	135.6/sq mi (52.3/km^{2})
Sanford	Town	Covington County	257	241	+6.6%	4.18	10.8	61.5/sq mi (23.7/km^{2})
Saraland	City	Mobile County	16,171	13,405	+20.6%	23.18	60.0	697.6/sq mi (269.4/km^{2})
Sardis City	Town	Etowah County	1,814	1,704	+6.5%	7.85	20.3	231.1/sq mi (89.2/km^{2})
Satsuma	City	Mobile County	6,749	6,168	+9.4%	7.52	19.5	897.5/sq mi (346.5/km^{2})
Scottsboro†	City	Jackson County	15,578	14,770	+5.5%	50.65	131.2	307.6/sq mi (118.8/km^{2})
Section	Town	Jackson County	756	770	−1.8%	4.57	11.8	165.4/sq mi (63.9/km^{2})
Semmes (Note: Semmes incorporated in 2011 and is thus not included in the 2010 census.)	City	Mobile County	4941			14.59	37.8	338.7/sq mi (130.8/km^{2})
Selma†	City	Dallas County	17,971	20,756	−13.4%	13.81	35.8	1,301.3/sq mi (502.4/km^{2})
Sheffield	City	Colbert County	9,403	9,039	+4.0%	6.37	16.5	1,476.1/sq mi (569.9/km^{2})
Shiloh	Town	DeKalb County	321	274	+17.2%	1.71	4.4	187.7/sq mi (72.5/km^{2})
Shorter	Town	Macon County	385	474	−18.8%	4.54	11.8	84.8/sq mi (32.7/km^{2})
Silas	Town	Choctaw County	377	452	−16.6%	5.21	13.5	72.4/sq mi (27.9/km^{2})
Silverhill	Town	Baldwin County	768	706	+8.8%	1.20	3.1	640.0/sq mi (247.1/km^{2})
Sipsey	Town	Walker County	363	437	−16.9%	0.48	1.2	756.3/sq mi (292.0/km^{2})
Skyline	Town	Jackson County	834	851	−2.0%	3.99	10.3	209.0/sq mi (80.7/km^{2})
Slocomb	City	Geneva County	2,082	1,980	+5.2%	9.49	24.6	219.4/sq mi (84.7/km^{2})
Smiths Station	City	Lee County	5,384	4,926	+9.3%	6.59	17.1	817.0/sq mi (315.4/km^{2})
Snead	Town	Blount County	1,032	835	+23.6%	5.26	13.6	196.2/sq mi (75.8/km^{2})
Somerville	Town	Morgan County	796	724	+9.9%	2.74	7.1	290.5/sq mi (112.2/km^{2})
South Vinemont	Town	Cullman County	558	749	−25.5%	0.88	2.3	634.1/sq mi (244.8/km^{2})
Southside	City	Etowah County; Calhoun County	9,426	8,412	+12.1%	18.98	49.2	496.6/sq mi (191.7/km^{2})
Spanish Fort	City	Baldwin County	10,049	6,798	+47.8%	28.71	74.4	350.0/sq mi (135.1/km^{2})
Springville	City	St. Clair County	4,786	4,080	+17.3%	8.90	23.1	537.8/sq mi (207.6/km^{2})
Steele	Town	St. Clair County	992	1,043	−4.9%	6.71	17.4	147.8/sq mi (57.1/km^{2})
Stevenson	City	Jackson County	1,955	2,046	−4.4%	7.72	20.0	253.2/sq mi (97.8/km^{2})
Sulligent	City	Lamar County	1,879	1,927	−2.5%	7.83	20.3	240.0/sq mi (92.7/km^{2})
Sumiton	City	Walker County; Jefferson County	2,444	2,520	−3.0%	5.22	13.5	468.2/sq mi (180.8/km^{2})
Summerdale	Town	Baldwin County	1,468	862	+70.3%	9.69	25.1	151.5/sq mi (58.5/km^{2})
Susan Moore	Town	Blount County	787	763	+3.1%	5.23	13.5	150.5/sq mi (58.1/km^{2})
Sweet Water	Town	Marengo County	228	258	−11.6%	2.02	5.2	112.9/sq mi (43.6/km^{2})
Sylacauga	City	Talladega County	12,578	12,749	−1.3%	19.49	50.5	645.4/sq mi (249.2/km^{2})
Sylvan Springs	Town	Jefferson County	1,653	1,542	+7.2%	8.69	22.5	190.2/sq mi (73.4/km^{2})
Sylvania	Town	DeKalb County	1,790	1,837	−2.6%	8.47	21.9	211.3/sq mi (81.6/km^{2})
Talladega Springs	Town	Talladega County	144	166	−13.3%	1.23	3.2	117.1/sq mi (45.2/km^{2})
Talladega†	City	Talladega County	15,861	15,676	+1.2%	23.98	62.1	661.4/sq mi (255.4/km^{2})
Tallassee	City	Elmore County; Tallapoosa County	4,763	4,819	−1.2%	9.67	25.0	492.6/sq mi (190.2/km^{2})
Tarrant	City	Jefferson County	6,124	6,397	−4.3%	6.36	16.5	962.9/sq mi (371.8/km^{2})
Taylor	Town	Houston County; Geneva County	2,262	2,375	−4.8%	7.36	19.1	307.3/sq mi (118.7/km^{2})
Thomaston	Town	Marengo County	326	417	−21.8%	2.01	5.2	162.2/sq mi (62.6/km^{2})
Thomasville	City	Clarke County	3,649	4,209	−13.3%	8.73	22.6	418.0/sq mi (161.4/km^{2})
Thorsby	Town	Chilton County	2,064	1,980	+4.2%	5.13	13.3	402.3/sq mi (155.3/km^{2})
Town Creek	Town	Lawrence County	1,052	1,100	−4.4%	2.68	6.9	392.5/sq mi (151.6/km^{2})
Toxey	Town	Choctaw County	145	137	+5.8%	0.68	1.8	213.2/sq mi (82.3/km^{2})
Trafford	Town	Jefferson County	613	646	−5.1%	2.44	6.3	251.2/sq mi (97.0/km^{2})
Triana	Town	Madison County	2,890	496	+482.7%	1.25	3.2	2,312.0/sq mi (892.7/km^{2})
Trinity	Town	Morgan County	2,526	2,095	+20.6%	4.41	11.4	572.8/sq mi (221.2/km^{2})
Troy†	City	Pike County	17,727	18,033	−1.7%	27.63	71.6	641.6/sq mi (247.7/km^{2})
Trussville	City	Jefferson County; St. Clair County	26,123	19,933	+31.1%	33.03	85.5	790.9/sq mi (305.4/km^{2})
Tuscaloosa†	City	Tuscaloosa County	99,600	90,468	+10.1%	60.23	156.0	1,653.7/sq mi (638.5/km^{2})
Tuscumbia†	City	Colbert County	9,054	8,423	+7.5%	8.75	22.7	1,034.7/sq mi (399.5/km^{2})
Tuskegee†	City	Macon County	9,395	9,865	−4.8%	16.09	41.7	583.9/sq mi (225.4/km^{2})
Twin	Town	Marion County	359	399	−10.0%	3.37	8.7	106.5/sq mi (41.1/km^{2})
Union Grove	Town	Marshall County	67	77	−13.0%	0.56	1.5	119.6/sq mi (46.2/km^{2})
Union Springs†	City	Bullock County	3,358	3,980	−15.6%	6.63	17.2	506.5/sq mi (195.6/km^{2})
Union	Town	Greene County	180	237	−24.1%	0.82	2.1	219.5/sq mi (84.8/km^{2})
Uniontown	City	Perry County	2,107	1,775	+18.7%	1.33	3.4	1,584.2/sq mi (611.7/km^{2})
Valley	City	Chambers County	10,529	9,524	+10.6%	11.03	28.6	954.6/sq mi (368.6/km^{2})
Valley Grande	City	Dallas County	4,190	4,020	+4.2%	33.51	86.8	125.0/sq mi (48.3/km^{2})
Valley Head	Town	DeKalb County	577	558	+3.4%	3.47	9.0	166.3/sq mi (64.2/km^{2})
Vance	Town	Tuscaloosa County; Bibb County	2,092	1,529	+36.8%	10.18	26.4	205.5/sq mi (79.3/km^{2})
Vernon†	City	Lamar County	1,921	2,000	−3.9%	5.88	15.2	326.7/sq mi (126.1/km^{2})
Vestavia Hills	City	Jefferson County; Shelby County	39,102	34,033	+14.9%	19.41	50.3	2,014.5/sq mi (777.8/km^{2})
Vina	Town	Franklin County	325	358	−9.2%	4.80	12.4	67.7/sq mi (26.1/km^{2})
Vincent	City	Shelby County; St. Clair County; Talladega County	1,982	1,988	−0.3%	19.57	50.7	101.3/sq mi (39.1/km^{2})
Vredenburgh	Town	Monroe County	222	312	−28.8%	1.50	3.9	148.0/sq mi (57.1/km^{2})
Wadley	Town	Randolph County	659	751	−12.3%	1.46	3.8	451.4/sq mi (174.3/km^{2})
Waldo	Town	Talladega County	258	283	−8.8%	2.81	7.3	91.8/sq mi (35.4/km^{2})
Walnut Grove	Town	Etowah County	773	698	+10.7%	5.03	13.0	153.7/sq mi (59.3/km^{2})
Warrior	City	Jefferson County; Blount County	3,224	3,176	+1.5%	9.77	25.3	330.0/sq mi (127.4/km^{2})
Waterloo	Town	Lauderdale County	178	203	−12.3%	0.75	1.9	237.3/sq mi (91.6/km^{2})
Waverly	Town	Chambers County; Lee County	159	145	+9.7%	2.72	7.0	58.5/sq mi (22.6/km^{2})
Weaver	City	Calhoun County	3,339	3,038	+9.9%	3.47	9.0	962.2/sq mi (371.5/km^{2})
Webb	Town	Houston County	1,270	1,430	−11.2%	11.40	29.5	111.4/sq mi (43.0/km^{2})
Wedowee†	Town	Randolph County	737	823	−10.4%	3.49	9.0	211.2/sq mi (81.5/km^{2})
West Blocton	Town	Bibb County	1,217	1,240	−1.9%	4.57	11.8	266.3/sq mi (102.8/km^{2})
West Jefferson	Town	Jefferson County	417	338	+23.4%	0.93	2.4	448.4/sq mi (173.1/km^{2})
West Point	Town	Cullman County	584	586	−0.3%	3.42	8.9	170.8/sq mi (65.9/km^{2})
Westover	City	Shelby County	1,766	1,275	+38.5%	18.41	47.7	95.9/sq mi (37.0/km^{2})
Wetumpka†	City	Elmore County	7,220	6,528	+10.6%	10.11	26.2	714.1/sq mi (275.7/km^{2})
White Hall	Town	Lowndes County	806	858	−6.1%	15.30	39.6	52.7/sq mi (20.3/km^{2})
Wilsonville	Town	Shelby County	1,857	1,827	+1.6%	9.62	24.9	193.0/sq mi (74.5/km^{2})
Wilton	Town	Shelby County	587	687	−14.6%	0.99	2.6	592.9/sq mi (228.9/km^{2})
Winfield	City	Marion County; Fayette County	4,845	4,717	+2.7%	17.28	44.8	280.4/sq mi (108.3/km^{2})
Woodland	Town	Randolph County	221	184	+20.1%	1.56	4.0	141.7/sq mi (54.7/km^{2})
Woodstock	Town	Bibb County; Tuscaloosa County	1,472	1,428	+3.1%	7.08	18.3	207.9/sq mi (80.3/km^{2})
Woodville	Town	Jackson County	746	746	0.0%	6.62	17.1	112.7/sq mi (43.5/km^{2})
Yellow Bluff	Town	Wilcox County	208	188	+10.6%	0.46	1.2	452.2/sq mi (174.6/km^{2})
York	City	Sumter County	2,414	2,538	−4.9%	6.87	17.8	351.4/sq mi (135.7/km^{2})
Total municipalities	—	—	3,081,319	2,885,389	+6.8%	4,873.41	12,624.2	632.2/sq mi (244.1/km^{2})
Alabama	—	—	5,024,279	4,779,736	+5.1%	50,645.33	131,170.8	99.2/sq mi (38.3/km^{2})

== See also ==
- List of census-designated places in Alabama
- List of unincorporated communities in Alabama
- List of ghost towns in Alabama
- List of place names in Alabama of Native American origin
- List of settlement nicknames in Alabama
- Alabama census statistical areas
