= Mount High =

Mount High may refer to:

- Mount High, Alabama, an unincorporated community in Blount County, Alabama, United States
- Mount High (Antarctica), a mountain in Palmer Land, Antarctica
