= Warrior, Alabama =

City in Alabama, United States

Warrior
- City
- Flag Seal

- Location of Warrior in Jefferson County, Alabama.
- Coordinates: 33°48′53″N 86°48′56″W
- Country: United States
- State: Alabama
- Counties: Blount, Jefferson

Area
  - Total: 9.78 sq mi (25.32 km^{2})
  - Land: 9.78 sq mi (25.32 km^{2})
  - Water: 0 sq mi (0.00 km^{2})
- Elevation: 558 ft (170 m)

Population (2020)
  - Total: 3,224
  - Density: 329.7/sq mi (127.31/km^{2})
- Time zone: UTC-6 (Central (CST))
  - Summer (DST): UTC-5 (CDT)
- ZIP code: 35180
- Area code: 205 & 659
- FIPS code: 01-79944
- GNIS feature ID: 2405676
- Website: www.thecityofwarrior.com

Warrior is a city in Jefferson and Blount counties in the State of Alabama. At the 2020 census, the population was 3,224. It is a northern suburb of Birmingham.

== History ==
Warrior was incorporated in either 1889 or 1899, though most records cite the 1889 date. The city derives its name from the nearby Black Warrior River.

== Geography ==
Warrior is the northernmost city in Jefferson County, with outlying parts of the city in Blount County. It is traversed by I-65 and U.S. Highway 31.

Warrior is located at 33°48'48.985" North, 86°48'41.238" West (33.813607, -86.811455).

According to the U.S. Census Bureau, the city has a total area of 9.8 square miles (25.3 km^{2}), all land.

Warrior is in the Central time zone. The elevation at the center of town is 564 feet (172 m), though it ranges from over 620 feet (190 m) north of the center to less than 300 feet (91 m) along the Locust Fork of the Black Warrior River, which forms the southern boundary of the city.

== City government ==
Warrior uses the mayor/council form of government. The city council consists of the mayor and five members. The city is divided into five geographic districts with each one electing a council member to represent it.

After having served as Warrior's longest-serving mayor and the only woman to hold the position, Rena Hudson, who became Warrior's first female mayor in 1984, retired to in 2012. She died on March 15, 2017, after serving as the mayor of Warrior from 1984 to 2000 and again from 2004 to 2012.

The current mayor of Warrior is Keith Mosley.

The first mayor of Warrior was William Anderson White.

== Annual events ==
Warrior Day, a yearly town festival, is held each year in early autumn. Entertainment and food vendors set up in town in addition to a large swap meet.

== Attractions ==
Rickwood Caverns State Park is located 7 miles (11 km) north of Warrior near Interstate 65 and the community of Smoke Rise. Featuring limestone formations, blind cave fish, and an underground pool, Rickwood Caverns is a recognized member of the National Caves Association, and offers more than a mile of living geology.

== Sports ==
Warrior is home of the 1992/1993 Class 2A (AHSAA) Boys' Basketball Champions from the former Warrior High School. In 1996, the Olympic Torch was relayed through the city during the weeks leading up to the 1996 Summer Olympic Games in Atlanta.

== Demographics ==
Historical population
Census	Pop.	Note	%±
1900	1,018		—
1910	660		−35.2%
1920	568		−13.9%
1930	646		13.7%
1940	1,008		56.0%
1950	1,384		37.3%
1960	2,448		76.9%
1970	2,621		7.1%
1980	3,260		24.4%
1990	3,280		0.6%
2000	3,169		−3.4%
2010	3,176		0.2%
2020	3,224		1.5%
U.S. Decennial Census; 2013 Estimate

=== Racial and ethnic composition ===
Warrior city, Alabama – Racial and ethnic composition Note: the US Census treats Hispanic/Latino as an ethnic category. This table excludes Latinos from the racial categories and assigns them to a separate category. Hispanics/Latinos may be of any race.
Race / Ethnicity (NH = Non-Hispanic)	Pop 2000	Pop 2010	Pop 2020	% 2000	% 2010	% 2020
White alone (NH)	2,629	2,626	2,523	82.96%	82.68%	78.26%
Black or African American alone (NH)	487	449	463	15.37%	14.14%	14.36%
Native American or Alaska Native alone (NH)	13	6	10	0.41%	0.19%	0.31%
Asian alone (NH)	5	14	16	0.16%	0.44%	0.50%
Native Hawaiian or Pacific Islander alone (NH)	0	4	0	0.00%	0.13%	0.00%
Other race alone (NH)	1	0	16	0.03%	0.00%	0.50%
Mixed race or Multiracial (NH)	24	52	140	0.76%	1.64%	4.34%
Hispanic or Latino (any race)	10	25	56	0.32%	0.79%	1.74%
Total	3,169	3,176	3,224	100.00%	100.00%	100.00%

=== 2020 census ===
As of the 2020 census, Warrior had a population of 3,224. The median age was 40.4 years. 21.9% of residents were under the age of 18 and 18.6% of residents were 65 years of age or older. For every 100 females, there were 88.4 males, and for every 100 females age 18 and over, there were 83.3 males age 18 and over.

0.0% of residents lived in urban areas, while 100.0% lived in rural areas.

There were 1,353 households in Warrior, of which 30.2% had children under the age of 18 living in them. Of all households, 39.7% were married-couple households, 19.1% were households with a male householder and no spouse or partner present, and 36.0% were households with a female householder and no spouse or partner present. About 30.1% of all households were made up of individuals and 12.0% had someone living alone who was 65 years of age or older.

There were 1,472 housing units, of which 8.1% were vacant. The homeowner vacancy rate was 1.7% and the rental vacancy rate was 5.7%.

=== 2010 census ===
As of the census of 2010, there were 3,176 people, 1,336 households, and 886 families living in the city. The population density was 402.2 inhabitants per square mile (155.3/km^{2}). There were 1,453 housing units at an average density of 148.3 per square mile (57.3/km^{2}). The racial makeup of the city was 83.1% White, 14.2% Black or African American, 0.2% Native American, 0.4% Asian, 0.2% from other races, and 1.8% from two or more races. Hispanic or Latino of any race were 0.8% of the population.

There were 1,336 households, out of which 24.6% had children under the age of 18 living with them, 44.2% were married couples living together, 15.7% had a female householder with no husband present, and 33.7% were non-families. 29.3% of all households were made up of individuals, and 10.3% had someone living alone who was 65 years of age or older. The average household size was 2.37 and the average family size was 2.92.

In the city, the age distribution of the population showed 21.4% under the age of 18, 8.6% from 18 to 24, 26.0% from 25 to 44, 28.0% from 45 to 64, and 15.9% who were 65 years of age or older. The median age was 40.3 years. For every 100 females, there were 91.7 males.

The median income for a household in the city was $35,851, and the median income for a family was $44,583. Males had a median income of $43,504 versus $30,081 for females. The per capita income for the city was $25,263. About 11.4% of families and 12.5% of the population were below the poverty line, including 6.4% of those under the age of 18 and 16.2% ages 65 and older.

=== 2000 census ===
As of the census of 2000, there were 3,169 people, 1,302 households, and 898 families living in the city. The population density was 402.2 inhabitants per square mile (155.3/km^{2}). There were 1,439 housing units at an average density of 182.6 per square mile (70.5/km^{2}). The racial makeup of the city was 83.21% White, 15.40% Black or African American, 0.41% Native American, 0.16% Asian, 0.03% from other races, and 0.79% from two or more races. Hispanic or Latino of any race were 0.32% of the population.

There were 1,302 households, out of which 28.6% had children under the age of 18 living with them, 49.1% were married couples living together, 16.1% had a female householder with no husband present, and 31.0% were non-families. 28.5% of all households were made up of individuals, and 15.1% had someone living alone who was 65 years of age or older. The average household size was 2.43 and the average family size was 2.98.

In the city, the age distribution of the population showed 22.8% under the age of 18, 9.5% from 18 to 24, 26.8% from 25 to 44, 24.1% from 45 to 64, and 16.8% who were 65 years of age or older. The median age was 39 years. For every 100 females, there were 87.4 males.

The median income for a household in the city was $28,143, and the median income for a family was $35,697. Males had a median income of $32,306 versus $20,486 for females. The per capita income for the city was $14,919. About 12.1% of families and 11.0% of the population were below the poverty line, including 15.9% of those under the age of 18 and 13.3% ages 65 and older.

== Media ==
Warrior is served by Birmingham TV stations. Birmingham is part of the Birmingham/Anniston/Tuscaloosa television market, which is the nation's 39th largest. The major television affiliates are: WBRC 6 (FOX) WBIQ 10 (PBS) WVTM 13 (NBC) WTTO 21 (CW) WBMA-LD 33/40 (ABC) WIAT 42 (CBS) WPXH 44 (ION) WABM 68 (MyNetworkTV).

Local publications include The North Jefferson News (weekly) and The Birmingham News (three times a week).

== Education ==
Warrior Elementary School is located in Warrior, and the city is served by Mortimer Jordan High School and North Jefferson Middle School in nearby Kimberly.

== Notable people ==
- John Arnold Austin, recipient of the Navy Cross
- Spencer Brown, American football running back
- Charles Stewart Parnell, "the uncrowned King of Ireland" lived in Warrior for a time in 1871
- Harry Salmon, baseball pitcher in the Negro leagues
