= Little Warrior =

Little Warrior may refer to:

== Literature and arts ==
- The Little Warrior (2021 film), Russian film
- The Little Warrior, the original title of the 1920 P. G. Wodehouse novel Jill the Reckless
- Little Warrior, British documentary about Johana Gómez (boxer), Venezuela
- Little Warrior, 2011 album by Shea Rose, singer-songwriter, performing artist, and music curator based in Boston, Massachusetts
- The Little Warrior, a 1969 Hong Kong film with Lydia Shum, Hong Kong comedian, MC, actress and singer

== People ==
- Annie Little Warrior (1895–1966), Hunkpapa Lakota artist
- Iván Pozo, Spanish professional boxer, known as El Pequeño Guerrero (The Little Warrior)
- Barb Honchak, American professional female mixed martial artist, known as Little Warrior
- Willie Barrow, American civil rights activist and minister, known as Little Warrior

== Places ==
- Little Warrior, Alabama, unincorporated community in Blount County, Alabama, United States
- Little Warrior River, Blount County, Alabama, United States
