= Mount High, Alabama =

Unincorporated community in Alabama, United States

- Unincorporated community
- Location within Alabama Location within the United States
- Coordinates: 34°08′38″N 86°22′44″W
- Country: United States
- State: Alabama
- County: Blount
- Elevation: 860 ft (260 m)
- Time zone: UTC-6 (Central (CST))
  - Summer (DST): UTC-5 (CDT)
- Area codes: 205, 659
- GNIS feature ID: 151807

Mount High, also known as High Mount, High Mound, or Highmound, is an unincorporated community in Blount County, Alabama, United States, located approximately two miles west of Interstate 65 and Smoke Rise, and approximately 25 miles north of Birmingham. Mount High also is just southwest of Rickwood Caverns State Park.
