= Miles C. Allgood =

American politician

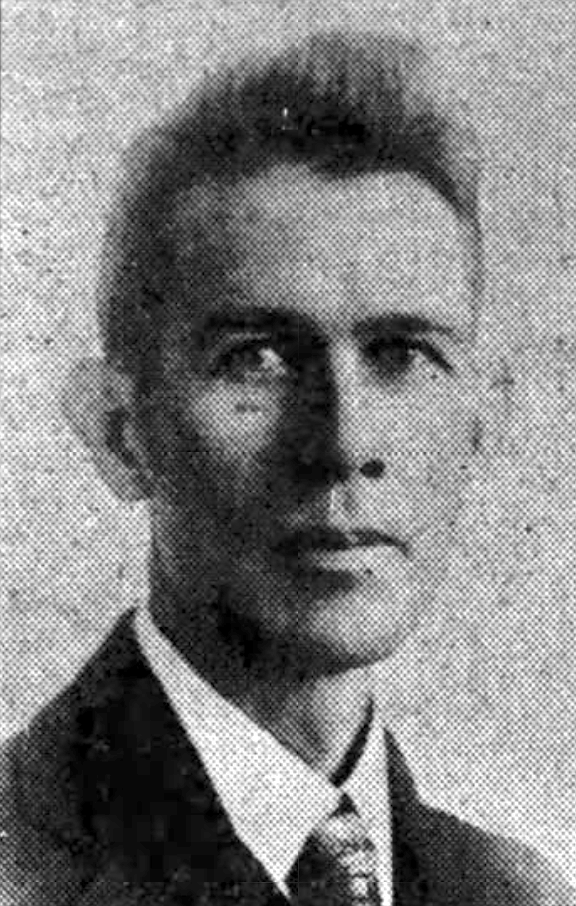

Member of the U.S. House of Representatives from Alabama
- In office March 4, 1923 – January 3, 1935
- Preceded by: Lilius B. Rainey (7th); LaFayette L. Patterson (5th)
- Succeeded by: William B. Bankhead (7th); Joe Starnes (5th)
- Constituency: 7th district (1923-33); 5th district (1933-35)

Personal details
- Born: Miles Clayton Allgood; February 22, 1878 Chepultepec (now Allgood), Alabama, U.S.
- Died: March 4, 1977 (aged 99) Fort Payne, Alabama, U.S.
- Resting place: Valley Head Cemetery, Valley Head, Alabama
- Citizenship: United States
- Party: Democratic
- Spouse: Willie Randall Fox Allgood
- Children: Miles Clayton Allgood, Jr., Mary Fox Allgood, William David Allgood
- Education: State Normal College (now the University of North Alabama)
- Profession: Teacher, politician

Miles Clayton Allgood (February 22, 1878 – March 4, 1977) was an American educator and politician who served six terms as a United States Representative from Alabama from 1923 to 1935.

== Biography ==
Born in Chepultepec (now Allgood), Blount County, Alabama, Allgood was the son of William Barnett and Mary Matilda (Ingram) Allgood. He attended the common schools of his native county and was graduated from the State Normal College at Florence, Alabama (now the University of North Alabama), in 1898. He married Willie Randall Fox on February 1, 1917; and was a cousin of Clarence William Allgood.

== Career ==
Allgood taught school in Blount County. He became the tax assessor of Blount County, Alabama from 1900 to 1909, and was a member of the State Democratic executive committee from 1908 to 1910. He served as Blount County agricultural demonstration agent from 1910 to 1913; State auditor of Alabama from 1914 to 1918; and as State commissioner of agriculture and industries from 1918 to 1922. He was elected as a delegate at large from Alabama to the Democratic National Convention at San Francisco in 1920.

=== Congress ===
Allgood was elected as a Democrat to the Sixty-eighth Congress and to the five succeeding Congresses, and served from March 4, 1923, to January 3, 1935. He was chairman of the Committee on War Claims (Seventy-second and Seventy-third Congresses).

Allgood was a proponent of establishing a minimum wage to encourage businesses to hire white workers over non-white workers who were willing to work for less, telling his fellow Congressmen he hoped a bare minimum wage law would put an end to out-of-state contractors bringing in "cheap colored labor... in competition with [local] white labor."

=== Later career ===
An unsuccessful candidate for renomination in 1934, Allgood served as a member of the Farm Security Administration from September 4, 1935, until he retired on December 1, 1943. He made an unsuccessful campaign for State treasurer in 1954 and again retired.

== Death ==
Allgood died in Fort Payne, Alabama, March 4, 1977 (age 99 years, 10 days). He is interred at Valley Head Cemetery, Valley Head, Alabama.

U.S. House of Representatives
Preceded by LaFayette L. Patterson	Member of the U.S. House of Representatives from Alabama's 5th congressional district 1923–1933	Succeeded by Joe Starnes
Preceded by Lilius Bratton Rainey	Member of the U.S. House of Representatives from Alabama's 7th congressional district 1933-1935	Succeeded by William B. Bankhead
