= Lilius B. Rainey =

American politician (1876–1959)

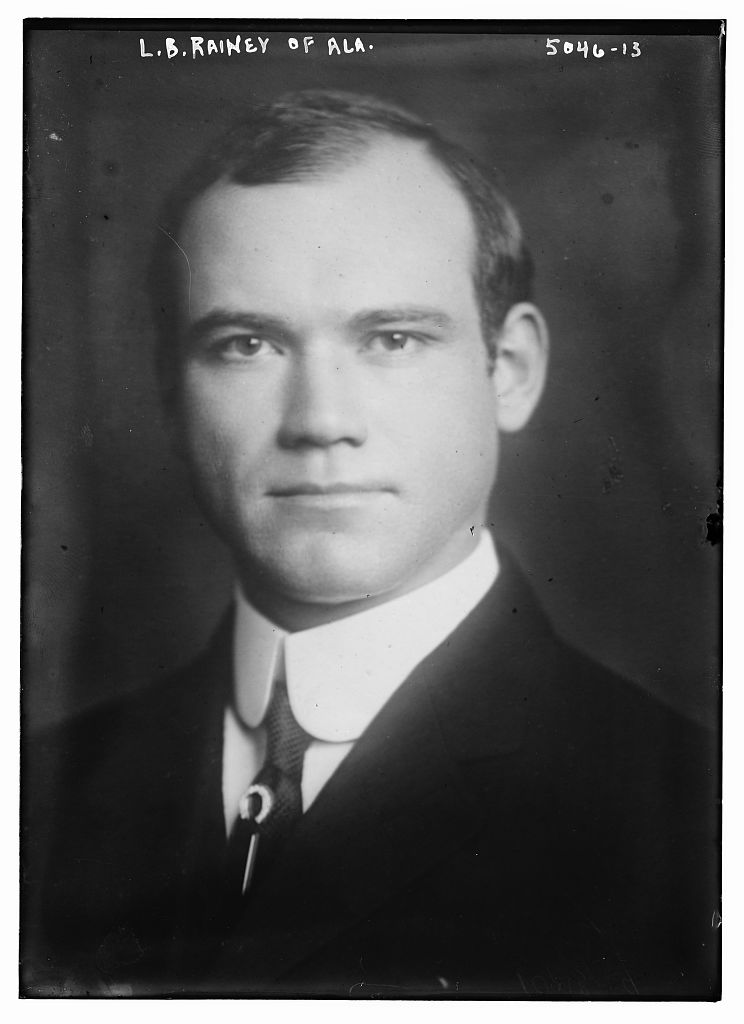
- Rainey circa 1920

Member of the U.S. House of Representatives from Alabama's 7th district
- In office September 30, 1919 – March 3, 1923
- Preceded by: John L. Burnett
- Succeeded by: Miles C. Allgood

Personal details
- Born: Lilius Bratton Rainey; July 27, 1876 Dadeville, Alabama, US
- Died: September 27, 1959 (aged 83) Gadsden, Alabama, US
- Resting place: Glenwood Cemetery in Fort Payne, Alabama
- Party: Democratic
- Spouse: Julia LaCoste Smith (m. 1911)
- Children: 4

Lilius Bratton Rainey (July 27, 1876 – September 27, 1959) was an American lawyer and politician who served two terms as a U.S. representative from Alabama from 1919 to 1923.

== Biography ==
He was born in Dadeville, Alabama on July 27, 1876.

Rainey attended the common schools and moved to Fort Payne, Alabama. He graduated from the Alabama Polytechnic Institute in Auburn, Alabama in 1899 and from the law department of the University of Alabama at Tuscaloosa in 1902. He was admitted to the bar in the latter year and commenced practice in Gadsden, Alabama.

Rainey was elected a captain in the Alabama National Guard in 1903. He was reelected and commissioned in 1906, but resigned the command in 1907. He was city solicitor of Gadsden from 1911 to 1917.

He married Julia LaCoste Smith in Rome, Georgia on July 18, 1911, and they had four children.

=== Congress ===
Rainey was elected as a Democrat to the Sixty-sixth Congress to fill the vacancy caused by the death of John L. Burnett. He was reelected to the Sixty-seventh Congress and served from September 30, 1919, to March 3, 1923. He declined to be a candidate for renomination in 1922.

He was also a trustee of the state department of archives and history, Montgomery, Alabama.

Rainey introduced the legislation to coin a commemorative half dollar celebrating the 100th anniversary of Alabama's admission to the union as the 22nd state.

=== Later career and death ===
He resumed the practice of law in Gadsden until his death.

He died in Gadsden on September 27, 1959, and he was interred in Glenwood Cemetery in Fort Payne, Alabama.

U.S. House of Representatives
Preceded by John L. Burnett	Member of the U.S. House of Representatives from Alabama's 7th congressional district September 30, 1919 – March 3, 1923	Succeeded by Miles C. Allgood
