= Highland Lake, Alabama =

- Town
- Seal

- Location of Highland Lake in Blount County, Alabama.
- Coordinates: 33°52′50″N 86°25′32″W
- Country: United States
- State: Alabama
- County: Blount

Area
  - Total: 1.99 sq mi (5.15 km^{2})
  - Land: 1.63 sq mi (4.23 km^{2})
  - Water: 0.36 sq mi (0.92 km^{2})
- Elevation: 961 ft (293 m)

Population (2020)
  - Total: 412
  - Density: 252.5/sq mi (97.49/km^{2})
- Time zone: UTC-6 (Central (CST))
  - Summer (DST): UTC-5 (CDT)
- ZIP code: 35121
- Area codes: 205, 659
- FIPS code: 01-34480
- GNIS feature ID: 2405832
- Website: www.highlandlakeal.gov

Highland Lake is a town in Blount County, Alabama, United States. At the 2020 census, the population was 412.

== Geography ==
Highland Lake is located in eastern Blount County. The town consists of homes built around Highland Lake, a reservoir on the Blackburn Fork of the Little Warrior River. The lake, at an elevation of 895 feet (273 m) above sea level, is in a valley between Blount Mountain to the southeast and Straight Mountain to the northwest. The town is 7 miles (11 km) southwest of Oneonta, the county seat, along County Road 29.

According to the U.S. Census Bureau, the town of Highland Lake has a total area of 2.0 square miles (5.2 km^{2}), of which 1.6 square miles (4.2 km^{2}) is land and 0.35 square miles (0.9 km^{2}), or 17.97%, is water.

== Demographics ==
Historical population
Census	Pop.	Note	%±
1970	108		—
1980	210		94.4%
1990	304		44.8%
2000	408		34.2%
2010	412		1.0%
2020	412		0.0%
U.S. Decennial Census; 2013 Estimate

As of the census of 2000, there were 408 people, 164 households, and 129 families residing in the town. The population density was 250.5 inhabitants per square mile (96.7/km^{2}). There were 226 housing units at an average density of 138.8 per square mile (53.6/km^{2}). The racial makeup of the town was 97.30% White, 0.25% Black or African American, 1.23% Native American, 0.74% Asian, and 0.49% from two or more races. 0.74% of the population were Hispanic or Latino of any race.

There were 164 households, out of which 29.3% had children under the age of 18 living with them, 72.0% were married couples living together, 4.3% had a female householder with no husband present, and 21.3% were non-families. 18.9% of all households were made up of individuals, and 6.7% had someone living alone who was 65 years of age or older. The average household size was 2.49 and the average family size was 2.84.

In the town, the population was spread out, with 23.3% under the age of 18, 5.4% from 18 to 24, 27.2% from 25 to 44, 29.2% from 45 to 64, and 15.0% who were 65 years of age or older. The median age was 40 years. For every 100 females, there were 96.2 males. For every 100 females age 18 and over, there were 98.1 males.

The median income for a household in the town was $43,229, and the median income for a family was $48,750. Males had a median income of $34,750 versus $28,333 for females. The per capita income for the town was $25,829. None of the families and 3.5% of the population were living below the poverty line, including no under eighteens and 5.4% of those over 64.
