= Rickwood Caverns State Park =

State park in Blount County, Alabama, United States

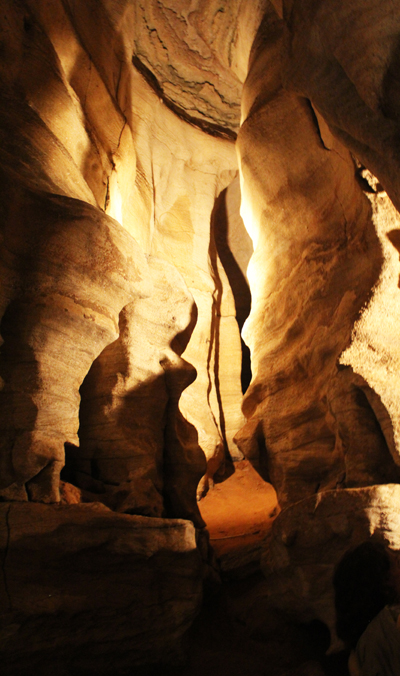

- Location within Alabama
- Location: Blount County, Alabama, United States
- Coordinates: 33°52′28″N 86°51′40″W
- Area: 380 acres (150 ha)
- Elevation: 968 ft (295 m)
- Established: 1954
- Administrator: Alabama Department of Conservation and Natural Resources
- Website: Official website

Rickwood Caverns State Park is a public recreation area and natural history preserve located 7 miles (11 km) north of Warrior, Alabama. The 380-acre (150 ha) state park offers tours of caverns with illuminated limestone formations estimated to be 260 million years old, blind cave fish, and an underground pool.

== History ==
The caverns were brought to public attention by Eddie Rickles and Sonny Arwood who combined their own names to create the name "Rickwood." Rickles had come across the caves in the early 1950s as the leader of a Boy Scout troop exploring the area. Rickwood Caverns operated as a commercial entity from 1954 to 1974, when the property was acquired by the state and reopened as a state park. The park was affected by the 2015 funding crisis that saw the closing or reassignment to local authorities of five Alabama state parks; after a six-month closure, it reopened in 2016.

== Awards ==
In September 2020, Rickwood Caverns State Park was one of eleven Alabama state parks awarded Tripadvisor’s Traveler’s Choice Award, which recognizes businesses and attractions that earn consistently high user reviews.

== Activities and amenities ==
The park surrounding the caverns features 380 acres of wilderness, an Olympic-sized swimming pool, picnic area with shelters, hiking trails, playground, campground, panning for gemstones and gift shop. Described as "mysterious and beautiful", the caverns feature guided tours of the so-called "miracle mile" of active "living" formations, 300 million year old fossils that are clearly visible in the soft limestone walls, spring-fed pools, and other curiosities.
