= Little Warrior, Alabama =

Unincorporated community in Alabama, United States

- Unincorporated community
- Location within Alabama Location within the United States
- Coordinates: 33°54′27″N 86°35′54″W
- Country: United States
- State: Alabama
- County: Blount
- Elevation: 472 ft (144 m)
- Time zone: UTC-6 (Central (CST))
  - Summer (DST): UTC-5 (CDT)
- Area codes: 205, 659
- GNIS feature ID: 156619

Little Warrior is an unincorporated community in Blount County, Alabama, United States.

== History ==
A post office called Little Warrior was established in 1852 and remained in operation until it was discontinued in 1905.
