= County Line, Alabama =

- Town
- Logo

- Location of County Line in Blount County and Jefferson County, Alabama.
- Coordinates: 33°49′15″N 86°43′10″W
- Country: United States
- State: Alabama
- Counties: Blount, Jefferson

Area
  - Total: 0.96 sq mi (2.48 km^{2})
  - Land: 0.96 sq mi (2.48 km^{2})
  - Water: 0 sq mi (0.00 km^{2})
- Elevation: 561 ft (171 m)

Population (2020)
  - Total: 311
  - Density: 325.4/sq mi (125.62/km^{2})
- Time zone: UTC-6 (Central (CST))
  - Summer (DST): UTC-5 (CDT)
- Area codes: 205 & 659
- FIPS code: 01-17968
- GNIS feature ID: 2406322
- Website: mycountyline.org

County Line is a town in Blount and Jefferson counties in the State of Alabama. At the 2020 census, the population was 311.

== Geography ==
County Line is located 1.3 miles (2.1 km) east of Trafford.

According to the United States Census Bureau, the town has a total area of 0.9 square miles (2.3 km^{2}), all land.

== Demographics ==
Historical population
Census	Pop.	Note	%±
1960	278		—
1970	199		−28.4%
1980	199		0.0%
1990	189		−5.0%
2000	257		36.0%
2010	258		0.4%
2020	311		20.5%
U.S. Decennial Census; 2013 Estimate

=== 2020 census ===
County Line town, Alabama – Racial and ethnic composition Note: the US Census treats Hispanic/Latino as an ethnic category. This table excludes Latinos from the racial categories and assigns them to a separate category. Hispanics/Latinos may be of any race.
Race / Ethnicity (NH = Non-Hispanic)	Pop 2000	Pop 2010	Pop 2020	% 2000	% 2010	% 2020
White alone (NH)	243	242	266	94.55%	93.80%	85.53%
Black or African American alone (NH)	7	3	4	2.72%	1.16%	1.29%
Native American or Alaska Native alone (NH)	0	8	2	0.00%	3.10%	0.64%
Asian alone (NH)	0	3	2	0.00%	1.16%	0.64%
Native Hawaiian or Pacific Islander alone (NH)	0	0	0	0.00%	0.00%	0.00%
Other race alone (NH)	0	0	0	0.00%	0.00%	0.00%
Mixed race or Multiracial (NH)	4	1	22	1.56%	0.39%	7.07%
Hispanic or Latino (any race)	3	1	15	1.17%	0.39%	4.82%
Total	257	258	311	100.00%	100.00%	100.00%

=== 2000 census ===
At the 2000 census, there were 257 people, 97 households, and 73 families in the town. The population density was 270.5 inhabitants per square mile (104.4/km^{2}). There were 106 housing units at an average density of 111.6 per square mile (43.1/km^{2}). The racial makeup of the town was 95.72% White, 2.72% Black or African American, and 1.56% from two or more races. 1.17% of the population were Hispanic or Latino of any race.

Of the 97 households 40.2% had children under the age of 18 living with them, 57.7% were married couples living together, 11.3% had a female householder with no husband present, and 24.7% were non-families. 23.7% of households were one person and 7.2% were one person aged 65 or older. The average household size was 2.65 and the average family size was 3.12.

The age distribution was 26.5% under the age of 18, 12.1% from 18 to 24, 31.1% from 25 to 44, 19.8% from 45 to 64, and 10.5% 65 or older. The median age was 33 years. For every 100 females, there were 114.2 males. For every 100 females age 18 and over, there were 110.0 males.

The median household income was $35,625 and the median family income was $37,500. Males had a median income of $28,500 versus $21,250 for females. The per capita income for the town was $13,621. About 13.8% of families and 17.4% of the population were below the poverty line, including 30.4% of those under the age of eighteen and 9.1% of those sixty five or over.

== Local government ==
County Line incorporated on August 27, 1957, as a town.

The town's government consists of a mayor and five city council members. As of July 2025, the mayor was Scott Mordecai.
