= Allgood, Alabama =

- Town
- Logo

- Location of Allgood in Blount County, Alabama.
- Coordinates: 33°54′23″N 86°31′04″W
- Country: United States
- State: Alabama
- County: Blount

Government
  - Type: Mayor-Council
  - Mayor: Barry Payne

Area
  - Total: 1.04 sq mi (2.69 km^{2})
  - Land: 1.04 sq mi (2.69 km^{2})
  - Water: 0 sq mi (0.00 km^{2})
- Elevation: 797 ft (243 m)

Population (2020)
  - Total: 548
  - Density: 528/sq mi (203.7/km^{2})
- Time zone: UTC-6 (Central (CST))
  - Summer (DST): UTC-5 (CDT)
- ZIP code: 35013
- Area codes: 205, 659
- FIPS code: 01-01396
- GNIS feature ID: 2405136
- Website: https://www.townofallgoodal.com/

Allgood, formerly known as Chepultepec, is a town in Blount County, Alabama, United States. At the 2020 census, the population was 548.

== History ==
One source said the town's name comes from a family of homesteaders from South Carolina who settled in the area in the early 19th century. However, another states that the original name of the village, Chepultepec, probably named for the Battle of Chapultepec in the Mexican–American War, was changed to "Allgood" in December 1915. A local lime manufacturer believed he was not getting repeat business because of the difficulty in spelling the name of the village and persuaded the local postmaster to change the name, with the postmaster giving the village his own name of Allgood. The town was formally incorporated in 1959. In 2010, it became the first locality in Alabama to achieve a Hispanic plurality.

== Geography ==
Allgood is located in south-central Blount County. It is in the Murphree Valley, with Straight Mountain to the southeast and Red Mountain and Sand Mountain to the northwest. Alabama State Route 75 passes through the town, leading northeast 3 miles (5 km) to Oneonta, the county seat, and southwest 38 miles (61 km) to Birmingham.

According to the U.S. Census Bureau, the town has a total area of 1.0 square mile (2.6 km^{2}), all land.

== Demographics ==
=== Allgood ===
Historical population
Census	Pop.	Note	%±
1960	147		—
1970	272		85.0%
1980	387		42.3%
1990	464		19.9%
2000	629		35.6%
2010	622		−1.1%
2020	548		−11.9%
U.S. Decennial Census

Allgood first appeared on the 1960 U.S. Census as an incorporated town.

=== 2020 Census data ===
Allgood racial composition
Race	Num.	Perc.
White (non-Hispanic)	233	42.52%
Black or African American (non-Hispanic)	7	1.28%
Native American	1	0.18%
Asian	2	0.36%
Pacific Islander	1	0.18%
Other/Mixed	17	3.1%
Hispanic or Latino	287	52.37%

As of the 2020 United States census, there were 548 people, 208 households, and 152 families residing in the town.

=== 2000 Census data ===
As of the census of 2000, there were 629 people, 189 households, and 140 families residing in the town. The population density was 606.6 inhabitants per square mile (234.2/km^{2}). There were 198 housing units at an average density of 190.9 per square mile (73.7/km^{2}). The racial makeup of the town was 83.94% White, 0.32% Black or African American, 0.48% Native American, 12.08% from other races, and 3.18% from two or more races. 43.40% of the population were Hispanic or Latino of any race.

There were 189 households, out of which 40.7% had children under the age of 18 living with them, 62.4% were married couples living together, 8.5% had a female householder with no husband present, and 25.9% were non-families. 18.5% of all households were made up of individuals, and 7.4% had someone living alone who was 65 years of age or older. The average household size was 3.33 and the average family size was 3.80.

In the town, the population dispersal was 30.7% under the age of 18, 14.8% from 18 to 24, 34.3% from 25 to 44, 15.4% from 45 to 64, and 4.8% who were 65 years of age or older. The median age was 28 years. For every 100 females, there were 109.0 males. For every 100 females age 18 and over, there were 116.9 males. The median income for a household in the town was $29,583, and the median income for a family was $30,750. Males had a median income of $31,058 versus $25,486 for females. The per capita income for the town was $11,729. About 23.4% of families and 27.3% of the population were below the poverty line, including 33.9% of those under age 18 and 8.7% of those age 65 or over.

=== Chepultepec/Allgood Precinct (1890–1950) ===
Historical population
Census	Pop.	Note	%±
1890	1,479		—
1900	720		−51.3%
1910	763		6.0%
1920	841		10.2%
1930	920		9.4%
1940	877		−4.7%
1950	917		4.6%
2020	548		—
U.S. Decennial Census

The precinct containing Allgood first appeared on the 1890 U.S. Census under its earlier name of Chepultepec, as the 11th precinct of Blount County. In 1950, the precinct was renamed Allgood. In 1960, the precinct was merged as part of a larger reorganization of counties into the census division of Oneonta.

== Water system controversy ==
The town received international press coverage when it posted a notice that residents who failed to "HAVE AN ALABAMA DRIVER'S LICENSE OR ALABAMA PICTURE ID CARD ON FILE AT THIS OFFICE" may lose water service. The notice is reported to be a reaction to an anti-illegal immigration bill, Alabama HB 56.

== Notable people ==
- Miles C. Allgood, U.S. Representative from Alabama's 5th congressional district from 1923 to 1935
- Albert A. Murphree, president of the University of Florida from 1909 to 1927
