= Rosa, Alabama =

- Town
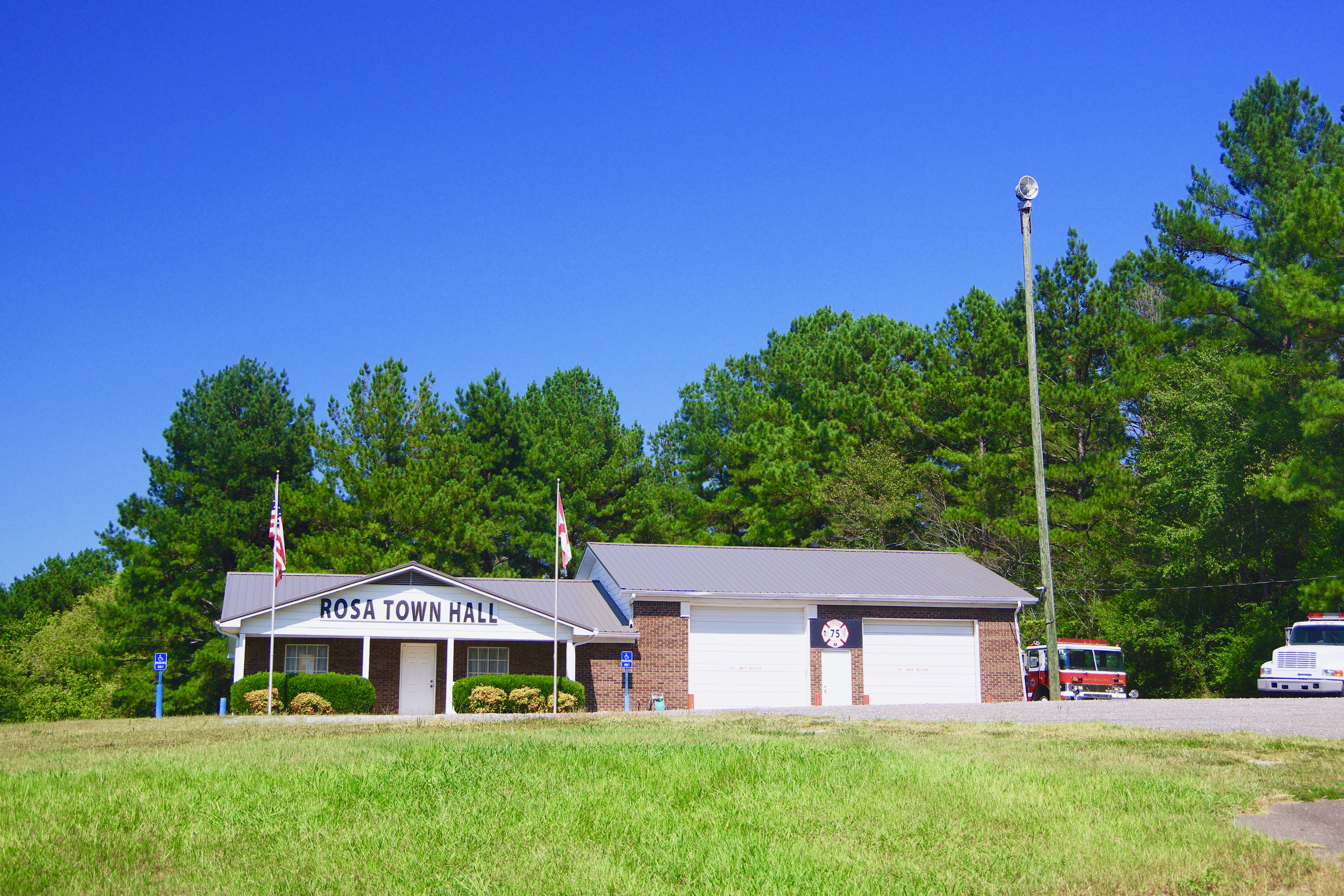
- Town Hall

- Location of Rosa in Blount County, Alabama.
- Coordinates: 33°59′43″N 86°29′53″W
- Country: United States
- State: Alabama
- County: Blount

Area
  - Total: 4.20 sq mi (10.88 km^{2})
  - Land: 4.19 sq mi (10.86 km^{2})
  - Water: 0.0077 sq mi (0.02 km^{2})
- Elevation: 637 ft (194 m)

Population (2020)
  - Total: 376
  - Density: 89.7/sq mi (34.62/km^{2})
- Time zone: UTC-6 (Central (CST))
  - Summer (DST): UTC-5 (CDT)
- ZIP code: 35121
- Area code: 205, 659
- FIPS code: 01-66408
- GNIS feature ID: 2407242

Rosa is a town in Blount County, Alabama, United States. At the 2020 census, the population was 376.

== Geography ==
Rosa is located in central Blount County. Its town limits extend southeast to border the city of Oneonta, the county seat. U.S. Route 231 passes through the center of Rosa, leading southeast 4 miles (6 km) to the center of Oneonta and 18 miles (29 km) to Interstate 59 near Ashville. US-231 leads west 3 miles (5 km) to Cleveland and then north 60 miles (97 km) to Huntsville.

According to the U.S. Census Bureau, Rosa has a total area of 3.8 square miles (9.8 km^{2}), of which 0.004 square miles (0.01 km^{2}), or 0.15%, is water.

== Demographics ==
Historical population
Census	Pop.	Note	%±
1980	204		—
1990	139		−31.9%
2000	313		125.2%
2010	316		1.0%
2020	376		19.0%
U.S. Decennial Census; 2013 Estimate

As of the census of 2000, there were 313 people, 125 households, and 93 families residing in the town. The population density was 82.9 inhabitants per square mile (32.0/km^{2}). There were 136 housing units at an average density of 36.0 per square mile (13.9/km^{2}). The racial makeup of the town was 99.68% White and 0.32% Native American. 0.64% of the population were Hispanic or Latino of any race.

There were 125 households, out of which 39.2% had children under the age of 18 living with them, 63.2% were married couples living together, 5.6% had a female householder with no husband present, and 25.6% were non-families. 24.8% of all households were made up of individuals, and 14.4% had someone living alone who was 65 years of age or older. The average household size was 2.50 and the average family size was 2.99.

In the town, the age distribution of the population shows 27.8% under the age of 18, 6.7% from 18 to 24, 28.8% from 25 to 44, 20.4% from 45 to 64, and 16.3% who were 65 years of age or older. The median age was 36 years. For every 100 females, there were 107.3 males. For every 100 females age 18 and over, there were 101.8 males.

The median income for a household in the town was $40,000, and the median income for a family was $56,563. Males had a median income of $31,250 versus $30,625 for females. The per capita income for the town was $17,042. About 6.2% of families and 7.5% of the population were below the poverty line, including 14.5% of those under age 18 and 3.4% of those age 65 or over.
