= Trafford, Alabama =

- Town
- Location of Trafford in Blount County and Jefferson County, Alabama.
- Coordinates: 33°49′19″N 86°45′12″W
- Country: United States
- State: Alabama
- Counties: Jefferson, Blount

Area
  - Total: 2.74 sq mi (7.10 km^{2})
  - Land: 2.74 sq mi (7.10 km^{2})
  - Water: 0 sq mi (0.00 km^{2})
- Elevation: 541 ft (165 m)

Population (2020)
  - Total: 613
  - Density: 223.5/sq mi (86.29/km^{2})
- Time zone: UTC-6 (Central (CST))
  - Summer (DST): UTC-5 (CDT)
- Area codes: 205 & 659
- FIPS code: 01-76680
- GNIS feature ID: 2406747
- Website: https://www.traffordal.gov/

Trafford is a town in Jefferson County, Alabama, United States. A small portion extends into Blount County. The town was incorporated in 1948. At the 2020 census, the population was 613.

== Geography ==
Trafford is located in northern Jefferson County. The Locust Fork of the Black Warrior River flows through the northwest part of town. The town of County Line borders the town to the east. Trafford is 26 miles (42 km) north of downtown Birmingham.

According to the U.S. Census Bureau, the town has a total area of 2.4 square miles (6.3 km^{2}), all land.

== Demographics ==
Historical population
Census	Pop.	Note	%±
1950	551		—
1960	529		−4.0%
1970	628		18.7%
1980	673		7.2%
1990	739		9.8%
2000	523		−29.2%
2010	646		23.5%
2020	613		−5.1%
U.S. Decennial Census; 2013 Estimate

=== 2020 census ===
Trafford town, Alabama – Racial and ethnic composition Note: the US Census treats Hispanic/Latino as an ethnic category. This table excludes Latinos from the racial categories and assigns them to a separate category. Hispanics/Latinos may be of any race.
Race / Ethnicity (NH = Non-Hispanic)	Pop 2000	Pop 2010	Pop 2020	% 2000	% 2010	% 2020
White alone (NH)	515	598	494	98.47%	92.57%	80.59%
Black or African American alone (NH)	5	38	60	0.96%	5.88%	9.79%
Native American or Alaska Native alone (NH)	0	1	1	0.00%	0.15%	0.16%
Asian alone (NH)	0	0	4	0.00%	0.00%	0.65%
Native Hawaiian or Pacific Islander alone (NH)	0	0	0	0.00%	0.00%	0.00%
Other race alone (NH)	0	0	2	0.00%	0.00%	0.33%
Mixed race or Multiracial (NH)	2	3	36	0.38%	0.46%	5.87%
Hispanic or Latino (any race)	1	6	16	0.19%	0.93%	2.61%
Total	523	646	613	100.00%	100.00%	100.00%

=== 2000 census ===
At the 2000 census there were 523 people, 220 households, and 159 families in the town. The population density was 344.5 inhabitants per square mile (133.0/km^{2}). There were 240 housing units at an average density of 158.1 per square mile (61.0/km^{2}). The racial makeup of the town was 98.47% White, 0.96% Black or African American, 0.19% from other races, 0.38% from two or more races and 0.19% of the population were Hispanic or Latino of any race. Of the 220 households 25.5% had children under the age of 18 living with them, 52.7% were married couples living together, 15.0% had a female householder with no husband present, and 27.7% were non-families. 25.5% of households were one person and 12.7% were one person aged 65 or older. The average household size was 2.38 and the average family size was 2.82.

The age distribution was 20.7% under the age of 18, 10.5% from 18 to 24, 27.2% from 25 to 44, 26.8% from 45 to 64, and 14.9% 65 or older. The median age was 40 years. For every 100 females, there were 90.2 males. For every 100 females age 18 and over, there were 86.1 males.

The median household income was $23,611 and the median family income was $32,292. Males had a median income of $29,375 versus $18,750 for females. The per capita income for the town was $11,926. About 17.0% of families and 21.3% of the population were below the poverty line, including 34.9% of those under age 18 and 22.0% of those age 65 or over.

== Government ==
As of 2023, the mayor of Trafford was Greg Rogers.
