= Blount County, Alabama =

County in Alabama, United States

- County
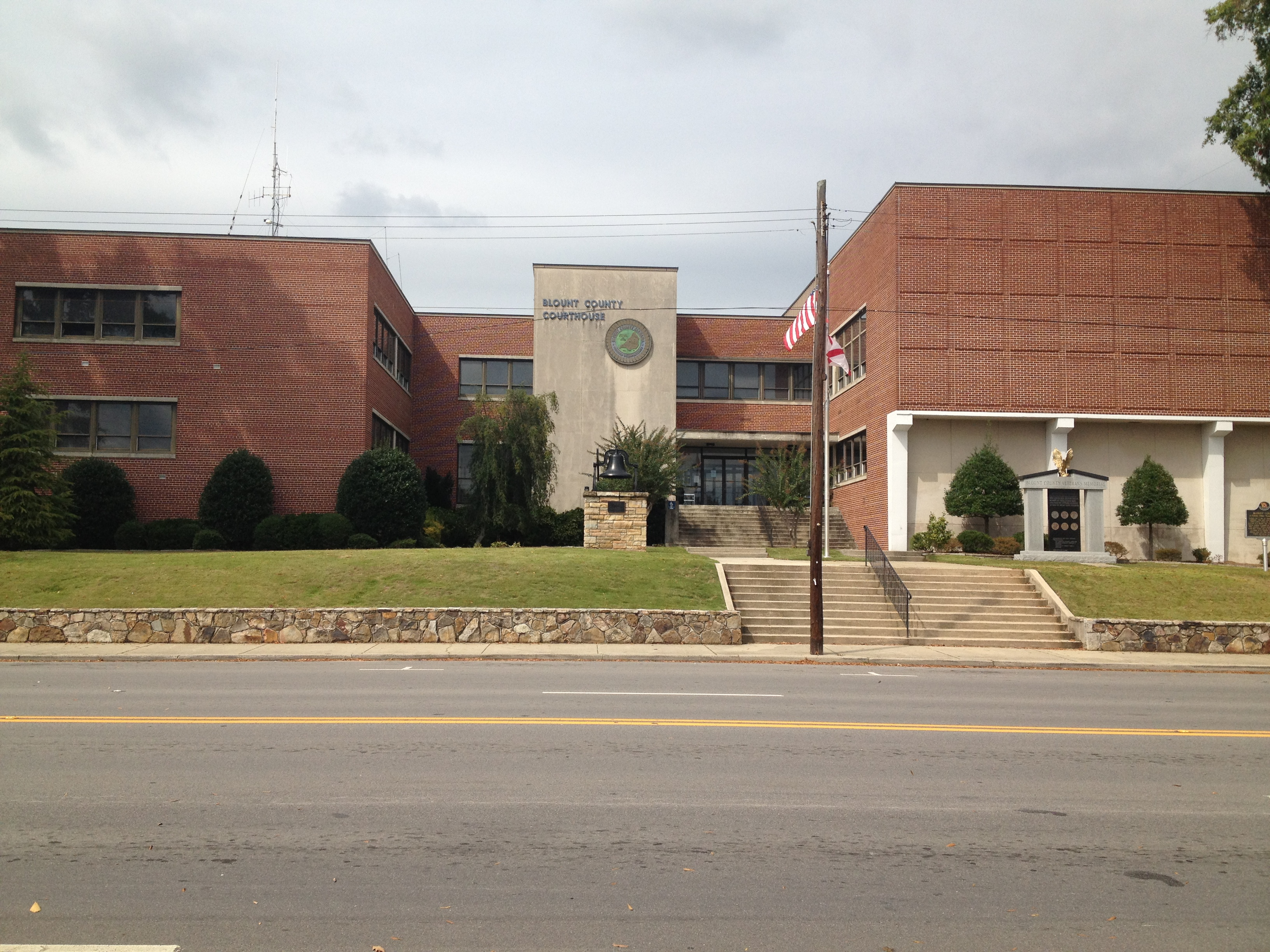
- Blount County Courthouse in Oneonta

- Seal Logo

- Location within the U.S. state of Alabama
- Coordinates: 33°58′N 86°35′W
- Country: United States
- State: Alabama
- Founded: February 6, 1818
- Named for: Willie Blount
- Seat: Oneonta
- Largest city: Oneonta

Area
  - Total: 651 sq mi (1,690 km^{2})
  - Land: 645 sq mi (1,670 km^{2})
  - Water: 5.9 sq mi (15 km^{2}) 0.9%

Population (2020)
  - Total: 59,134
  - Estimate (2025): 60,156 ▲
  - Density: 91.7/sq mi (35.4/km^{2})
- Time zone: UTC−6 (Central)
  - Summer (DST): UTC−5 (CDT)
- Congressional district: 6th
- Website: www.blountcountyal.gov
- County Number 08 on Alabama Licence Plates

Blount County is a county located in the U.S. state of Alabama. As of the 2020 census, the population was 59,134. Its county seat is Oneonta.

Blount County is a moist county. In the November 6, 2012 elections, a countywide ballot initiative to allow alcohol sales was narrowly defeated, but Blountsville, Cleveland and Oneonta have allowed for the sale of alcohol since 2013.

Blount County has been dubbed the "Covered Bridge Capital of Alabama" since it has more historic covered bridges standing within a single county than any other in the state - with earlier covered bridges known of. This county celebrates the Covered Bridge Festival every autumn in Oneonta to commemorate its three remaining covered bridges.

== History ==
Blount County was created by the Alabama Territorial Legislature on February 6, 1818, formed from land ceded to the federal government by the Creek Nation on August 9, 1814. This county was named for Governor Willie Blount of Tennessee, who provided assistance to settlers in Alabama during the Creek War. This county lies in the northeastern quadrant of the state, which is sometimes known as the mineral region of Alabama. Blount County is bordered by Cullman, Marshall, Etowah, Jefferson, Walker, and St. Clair Counties. This county is drained by the Locust and Mulberry Forks of the Black Warrior River. Blount County covers 650 square miles (1,700 km^{2}). The Warrior coal field is located in Blount County.

Caleb Fryley and John Jones established Bear Meat Cabin, an English translation of Wassausey (a Native American village), in 1816. Its post office was opened in 1821, and the settlement was incorporated as Blountsville on December 13, 1827. In 1889, an election resulted in the county seat being transferred to Oneonta, Alabama.

== Geography ==
According to the United States Census Bureau, the county has a total area of 651 square miles (1,690 km^{2}), of which 645 square miles (1,670 km^{2}) is land and 5.9 square miles (15 km^{2}) (0.9%) is water.

=== Adjacent counties ===
- Marshall County – northeast
- Etowah County – east
- St. Clair County – southeast
- Walker County – southwest
- Jefferson County – south
- Cullman County – northwest

== Transportation ==
=== Major highways ===
- Interstate 65
- U.S. Highway 31 / State Route 3 (unsigned)
- U.S. Highway 231 / State Route 53 (unsigned)
- U.S. Highway 278 / State Route 74 (unsigned)
- State Route 67
- State Route 75
- State Route 79
- State Route 132
- State Route 160

=== Rail ===
- CSX Transportation, formerly the Louisville and Nashville Railroad

== Demographics ==
Historical population
Census	Pop.	Note	%±
1820	2,415		—
1830	4,233		75.3%
1840	5,570		31.6%
1850	7,367		32.3%
1860	10,865		47.5%
1870	9,945		−8.5%
1880	15,369		54.5%
1890	21,927		42.7%
1900	23,119		5.4%
1910	21,456		−7.2%
1920	25,538		19.0%
1930	28,020		9.7%
1940	29,490		5.2%
1950	28,975		−1.7%
1960	25,449		−12.2%
1970	26,853		5.5%
1980	36,459		35.8%
1990	39,248		7.6%
2000	51,024		30.0%
2010	57,322		12.3%
2020	59,134		3.2%
2025 (est.)	60,156	▲	1.7%
U.S. Decennial Census; 1790–1960 1900–1990; 1990–2000 2010–2020

=== 2020 census ===
As of the 2020 census, the county had a population of 59,134. The median age was 41.1 years. 23.2% of residents were under the age of 18 and 18.6% of residents were 65 years of age or older. For every 100 females there were 97.5 males, and for every 100 females age 18 and over there were 95.8 males age 18 and over.

The racial makeup of the county was 85.7% White, 1.4% Black or African American, 0.6% American Indian and Alaska Native, 0.3% Asian, 0.0% Native Hawaiian and Pacific Islander, 5.8% from some other race, and 6.2% from two or more races. Hispanic or Latino residents of any race comprised 9.8% of the population.

9.5% of residents lived in urban areas, while 90.5% lived in rural areas.

There were 22,367 households in the county, of which 32.2% had children under the age of 18 living with them and 22.8% had a female householder with no spouse or partner present. About 23.8% of all households were made up of individuals and 11.5% had someone living alone who was 65 years of age or older.

There were 24,622 housing units, of which 9.2% were vacant. Among occupied housing units, 80.9% were owner-occupied and 19.1% were renter-occupied. The homeowner vacancy rate was 1.4% and the rental vacancy rate was 6.6%.

=== Racial and ethnic composition ===
Blount County, Alabama – Racial and ethnic composition Note: the US Census treats Hispanic/Latino as an ethnic category. This table excludes Latinos from the racial categories and assigns them to a separate category. Hispanics/Latinos may be of any race.
Race / Ethnicity (NH = Non-Hispanic)	Pop 2000	Pop 2010	Pop 2020	% 2000	% 2010	% 2020
White alone (NH)	46,999	50,952	49,764	92.11%	88.89%	84.15%
Black or African American alone (NH)	598	724	826	1.17%	1.26%	1.40%
Native American or Alaska Native alone (NH)	212	285	188	0.42%	0.50%	0.32%
Asian alone (NH)	70	115	174	0.14%	0.20%	0.29%
Pacific Islander alone (NH)	6	18	11	0.01%	0.03%	0.02%
Other race alone (NH)	14	35	100	0.03%	0.06%	0.17%
Mixed race or Multiracial (NH)	407	567	2,300	0.80%	0.99%	3.89%
Hispanic or Latino (any race)	2,718	4,626	5,771	5.33%	8.07%	9.76%
Total	51,024	57,322	59,134	100.00%	100.00%	100.00%

=== 2010 census ===
As of the census of 2010, there were 57,322 people, 16,175 households, and 16,175 families residing in the county. The population density was 88.79 people per square mile. There were 23,887 housing units at an average density of 37 per square mile. The racial makeup of the county was 92.6% White, 1.3% Black or African American, 0.5% Native American, 0.2% Asian, 0.1% Pacific Islander, 4.1% from other races, and 1.2% from two or more races. 8.1% of the population were Hispanic or Latino of any race.

There were 16,175 family households, of which 31.1% had children under the age of 18 living with them, 60.6% were married couples living together, 9.7% had a female householder with no husband present, and 25% were non-families. Alternative households included: 22.2% of households were made up of those living alone and 9.7% had someone living alone who was 65 years of age or older. The average household size was 2.63 and the average family size was 3.72.

Blount County's population spread was as follows: 25.40% under the age of 18, 8.40% from 18 to 24, 29.20% from 25 to 44, 24.10% from 45 to 64, and 12.90% were 65 years of age or older. The median age was 36 years. For every 100 females, there were 99.70 males. For every 100 females age 18 and over, there were 97.30 males.

The median income for a household in the county was $35,241, and the median income for a family was $41,573. Males had a median income of $31,455 versus $22,459 for females. The per capita income for the county was $16,325. About 8.60% of families and 11.70% of the population were below the poverty line, including 13.20% of those under age 18 and 17.40% of those age 65 or over.

== Education ==
Blount County contains two public school districts. There are approximately 9,200 students in public PK-12 schools in Blount County.

=== Districts ===
School districts include:

- Blount County School District
- Oneonta City School District

== Communities ==
=== Cities ===
- Oneonta (county seat)
- Warrior (mostly in Jefferson County)

=== Towns ===
- Allgood
- Altoona (partly in Etowah County)
- Blountsville
- Cleveland
- County Line (partly in Jefferson County)
- Garden City (partly in Cullman County)
- Hayden
- Highland Lake
- Locust Fork
- Nectar
- Rosa
- Snead
- Susan Moore
- Trafford (partly in Jefferson County)

=== Census-designated places ===
- Remlap
- Smoke Rise

=== Unincorporated communities ===
- Bangor
- Blount Springs
- Brooksville
- Little Warrior
- Mount High
- Sky Ball
- Summit

== Government ==
Blount County is a stronghold for Republicans. Since 2004, it has voted for the Republican presidential nominee with at least eighty percent of the vote every time. It was Hubert Humphrey's weakest county in the nation in 1968 with only 3.64 percent of the vote.

United States presidential election results for Blount County, Alabama
Year	Republican		Democratic		Third party(ies)	
Year	No.	%	No.	%	No.	%
1824	3	1.73%	167	96.53%	3	1.73%
1832	0	0.00%	443	100.00%	0	0.00%
1836	55	10.28%	480	89.72%	0	0.00%
1840	105	12.73%	720	87.27%	0	0.00%
1844	84	9.79%	774	90.21%	0	0.00%
1848	134	20.30%	526	79.70%	0	0.00%
1852	55	11.53%	422	88.47%	0	0.00%
1856	0	0.00%	770	95.42%	37	4.58%
1860	0	0.00%	488	39.01%	763	60.99%
1868	275	37.36%	461	62.64%	0	0.00%
1872	276	33.45%	549	66.55%	0	0.00%
1876	347	19.84%	1,402	80.16%	0	0.00%
1880	260	16.48%	1,318	83.52%	0	0.00%
1884	463	23.71%	1,490	76.29%	0	0.00%
1888	375	16.63%	1,873	83.06%	7	0.31%
1892	58	1.75%	1,944	58.80%	1,304	39.44%
1896	2,619	51.24%	2,422	47.39%	70	1.37%
1900	1,134	40.44%	1,484	52.92%	186	6.63%
1904	910	37.51%	1,383	57.01%	133	5.48%
1908	973	45.34%	1,133	52.80%	40	1.86%
1912	567	24.65%	1,121	48.74%	612	26.61%
1916	1,229	44.71%	1,488	54.13%	32	1.16%
1920	3,465	49.15%	3,535	50.14%	50	0.71%
1924	1,518	40.92%	2,083	56.15%	109	2.94%
1928	1,745	52.06%	1,607	47.94%	0	0.00%
1932	582	20.34%	2,232	77.99%	48	1.68%
1936	744	20.88%	2,788	78.23%	32	0.90%
1940	855	23.25%	2,784	75.71%	38	1.03%
1944	998	31.73%	2,134	67.85%	13	0.41%
1948	771	30.08%	0	0.00%	1,792	69.92%
1952	1,720	35.19%	3,161	64.67%	7	0.14%
1956	2,628	44.38%	3,208	54.17%	86	1.45%
1960	2,557	42.80%	3,404	56.98%	13	0.22%
1964	4,442	64.67%	0	0.00%	2,427	35.33%
1968	2,013	22.15%	331	3.64%	6,742	74.20%
1972	6,486	79.36%	1,582	19.36%	105	1.28%
1976	4,233	38.56%	6,645	60.53%	100	0.91%
1980	6,819	53.59%	5,656	44.45%	249	1.96%
1984	8,508	68.16%	3,738	29.95%	236	1.89%
1988	8,754	64.61%	4,485	33.10%	309	2.28%
1992	8,882	53.81%	5,433	32.92%	2,190	13.27%
1996	9,056	59.09%	5,061	33.02%	1,210	7.89%
2000	12,667	70.48%	4,977	27.69%	329	1.83%
2004	17,386	80.85%	3,938	18.31%	180	0.84%
2008	20,389	84.02%	3,522	14.51%	356	1.47%
2012	20,757	86.27%	2,970	12.34%	333	1.38%
2016	22,859	89.33%	2,156	8.43%	573	2.24%
2020	24,711	89.57%	2,640	9.57%	237	0.86%
2024	25,354	90.03%	2,576	9.15%	233	0.83%

United States Senate election results for Blount County, Alabama2
Year	Republican		Democratic		Third party(ies)	
Year	No.	%	No.	%	No.	%
2020	24,163	87.85%	3,290	11.96%	53	0.19%

United States Senate election results for Blount County, Alabama3
Year	Republican		Democratic		Third party(ies)	
Year	No.	%	No.	%	No.	%
2022	14,904	89.86%	1,130	6.81%	552	3.33%

Alabama Gubernatorial election results for Blount County
Year	Republican		Democratic		Third party(ies)	
Year	No.	%	No.	%	No.	%
2022	14,895	89.70%	930	5.60%	780	4.70%

== Places of interest ==
Blount County is home to an abundance of outdoor activities, such as Rickwood Caverns State Park and the Locust Fork of the Black Warrior River that are used by canoeists and kayakers. The county is also home to the picturesque covered bridges mentioned below: the Swann Covered Bridge, the Horton Mill Covered Bridge, and the Easley Covered Bridge. As of summer 2009, all three bridges were closed due to safety concerns at the recommendation of the Alabama Department of Transportation. Restorations were completed from 2011 through 2013 and they are once again open.

== See also ==
- List of Alabama covered bridges
- National Register of Historic Places listings in Blount County, Alabama
- Properties on the Alabama Register of Landmarks and Heritage in Blount County, Alabama
