= Smoke Rise, Alabama =

- CDP
- Location in Blount County and the state of Alabama
- Coordinates: 33°52′20″N 86°49′24″W
- Country: United States
- State: Alabama
- County: Blount

Area
  - Total: 5.81 sq mi (15.06 km^{2})
  - Land: 5.80 sq mi (15.03 km^{2})
  - Water: 0.012 sq mi (0.03 km^{2})
- Elevation: 564 ft (172 m)

Population (2020)
  - Total: 1,661
  - Density: 286/sq mi (110.5/km^{2})
- Time zone: UTC-6 (Central (CST))
  - Summer (DST): UTC-5 (CDT)
- FIPS code: 01-71201
- GNIS feature ID: 2402861

Smoke Rise is a census-designated place (CDP) in Blount County, Alabama, United States. At the 2020 census, the population was 1,661.

== History ==
Smoke Rise lies east of Interstate 65 in western Blount County, with most homes sitting atop Bryant Mountain or in the valley below. The community began in the late 1960s as a large planned residential subdivision. Smoke Rise originally was slated to include its own community school, but those plans never came to fruition; today, children there attend public schools in nearby Hayden.

Residents founded the Smoke Rise Homeowners Association in the mid-1990s, but the community remains unincorporated despite occasional discussion of an incorporation vote. Few businesses are in Smoke Rise's immediate vicinity, but many observers expect the impending construction of a new sewer system in western Blount County to fuel commercial growth.

== Geography ==
According to the U.S. Census Bureau, the CDP has a total area of 6.4 square miles (17 km^{2}), of which 6.4 square miles (17 km^{2}) is land and 0.16% is water.

== Demographics ==
Historical population
Census	Pop.	Note	%±
2000	1,750		—
2010	1,825		4.3%
2020	1,661		−9.0%
U.S. Decennial Census

=== Racial and ethnic composition ===
Smoke Rise CDP, Alabama – Racial and ethnic composition Note: the US Census treats Hispanic/Latino as an ethnic category. This table excludes Latinos from the racial categories and assigns them to a separate category. Hispanics/Latinos may be of any race.
Race / Ethnicity (NH = Non-Hispanic)	Pop 2000	Pop 2010	Pop 2020	% 2000	% 2010	% 2020
White alone (NH)	1,720	1,777	1,572	98.29%	97.37%	94.64%
Black or African American alone (NH)	0	9	4	0.00%	0.49%	0.24%
Native American or Alaska Native alone (NH)	8	9	3	0.46%	0.49%	0.18%
Asian alone (NH)	1	1	2	0.06%	0.05%	0.12%
Native Hawaiian or Pacific Islander alone (NH)	0	0	0	0.00%	0.00%	0.00%
Other race alone (NH)	0	2	2	0.00%	0.11%	0.12%
Mixed race or Multiracial (NH)	17	14	54	0.97%	0.77%	3.25%
Hispanic or Latino (any race)	4	13	24	0.23%	0.71%	1.44%
Total	1,750	1,825	1,661	100.00%	100.00%	100.00%

=== 2020 census ===
As of the 2020 census, there were 1,661 people, 622 households, and 575 families residing in the CDP.

The median age was 45.7 years. 20.7% of residents were under the age of 18 and 22.9% of residents were 65 years of age or older. For every 100 females there were 97.0 males, and for every 100 females age 18 and over there were 91.8 males age 18 and over.

Of households, 31.0% had children under the age of 18 living in them. Of all households, 69.6% were married-couple households, 10.5% were households with a male householder and no spouse or partner present, and 17.5% were households with a female householder and no spouse or partner present. About 16.2% of all households were made up of individuals and 6.8% had someone living alone who was 65 years of age or older.

There were 644 housing units, of which 3.4% were vacant. The homeowner vacancy rate was 0.0% and the rental vacancy rate was 0.0%. 0.0% of residents lived in urban areas, while 100.0% lived in rural areas.

=== 2010 census ===
As of the census of 2010, there were 1,825 people, 692 households, and 566 families residing in the CDP. The population density was 290 inhabitants per square mile (110/km^{2}). There were 715 housing units at an average density of 111.7 per square mile (43.1/km^{2}). The racial makeup of the CDP was 98.0% White, 0.5% Native American, 0.1% Asian, and 0.8% from two or more races. 0.7% of the population were Hispanic or Latino of any race.

There were 692 households, out of which 27.7% had children under the age of 18 living with them, 69.8% were married couples living together, 9.0% had a female householder with no husband present, and 18.2% were non-families. 15.3% of all households were made up of individuals, and 6.1% had someone living alone who was 65 years of age or older. The average household size was 2.64 and the average family size was 2.91.

In the CDP, the age distribution of the population shows 21.1% under the age of 18, 6.8% from 18 to 24, 23.0% from 25 to 44, 32.6% from 45 to 64, and 16.5% who were 65 years of age or older. The median age was 44.4 years. For every 100 females, there were 94.4 males. For every 100 females age 18 and over, there were 90.0 males.

The median income for a household in the CDP was $71,446, and the median income for a family was $80,333. Males had a median income of $42,969 versus $41,818 for females. The per capita income for the CDP was $27,909. About 0% of families and 0% of the population were below the poverty line, including none of those under age 18 and 0% of those age 65 or over.
