= List of school districts in Alabama =

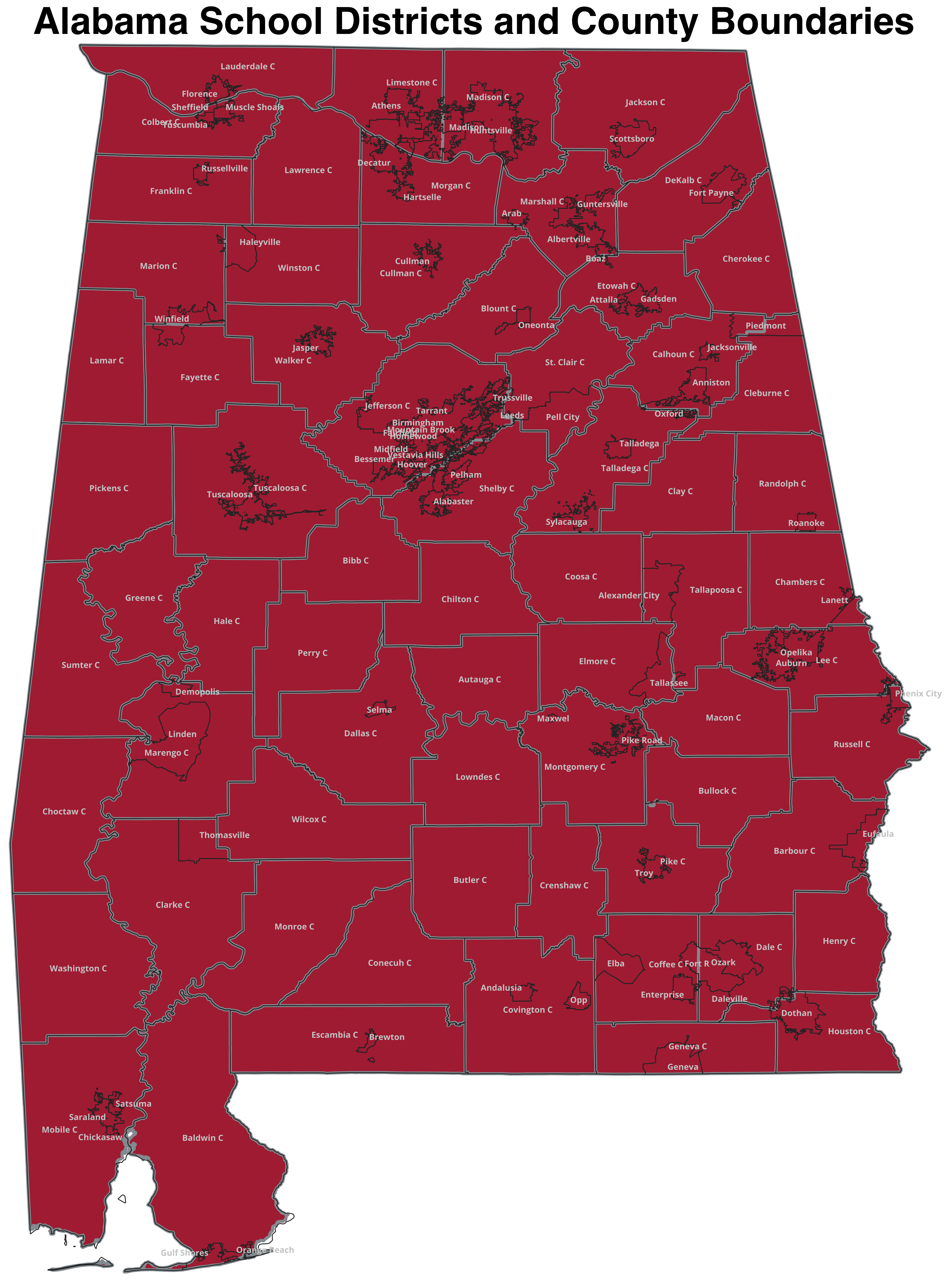
Alabama School Districts

This is a list of school districts in Alabama.

The U.S. Census Bureau considers all school districts in the state to be separate governments, and it does not classify any as being dependent on another layer of government.

School District	Location	Schools	Students	Faculty (FTE)	Ratio	Per Pupil Spending
Alabaster City	Alabaster	5	6,187	354.38	17:1	$10,334
Albertville City	Albertville	6	5,842	301.50	19:1	$8,554
Alexander City	Alexander	5	2,948	170.39	17:1	$9,772
Andalusia City	Andalusia	3	1,785	100.56	18:1	$8,851
Anniston City	Anniston	7	1,898	100.34	19:1	$11,745
Arab City	Arab	4	2,609	158.11	17:1	$9,054
Attalla City	Attalla	3	1,470	90.07	16:1	$9,915
Athens City	Athens	8	4,538	231.32	20:1	$10,312
Auburn City	Auburn	13	8,971	501.5	18:1	$9,976
Autauga County	Prattville	15	8,955	470.50	19:1	$8,139
Baldwin County	Bay Minette	43	24,869	1,895.36	13:1	$10,427
Barbour County	Clayton	3	687	41.28	17:1	$12,934
Bessemer City	Bessemer	9	3,318	181.75	18:1	$10,481
Bibb County	Centreville	9	3,117	180.75	17:1	$10,015
Birmingham City	Birmingham	51	21,957	1,208.40	18:1	$11,903
Blount County	Oneonta	17	7,756	437.29	18:1	$8,747
Boaz City	Boaz	5	2,431	135.40	18:1	$10,062
Brewton City	Brewton	3	1,192	73.50	16:1	$10,413
Bullock County	Union Springs	4	1,434	79.00	18:1	$9,772
Butler County	Greenville	7	2,959	152.50	19:1	$9,363
Calhoun County	Anniston	19	8,104	481.22	17:1	$9,699
Chambers County	Lafayette	11	3,386	202.09	17:1	$9,589
Cherokee County	Centre	8	3,833	240.40	16:1	$10,306
Chickasaw	Chickasaw	3	2,771	65.19	43:1	$8,367
Chilton County	Clanton	14	7,705	424.75	18:1	$8,621
Choctaw County	Butler	4	1,126	69.00	16:1	$12,046
Clarke County	Grove Hill	7	2,271	145.10	16:1	$10,802
Clay County	Ashland	4	1,804	111.75	16:1	$9,673
Cleburne County	Heflin	9	2,510	152.33	16:1	$9,119
Coffee County	Elba	4	2,541	138.00	18:1	$8,976
Colbert County	Tuscumbia	8	2,618	175.07	15:1	$11,379
Conecuh County	Evergreen	8	1,659	82.82	20:1	$11,080
Coosa County	Rockford	2	777	45.51	17:1	$11,696
Covington County	Andalusia	9	2,880	189.43	15:1	$9,641
Crenshaw County	Luverne	4	2,211	139.67	16:1	$9,167
Cullman City	Cullman	7	3,170	185.83	17:1	$9,899
Cullman County	Cullman	26	9,312	524.08	18:1	$9,872
Dale County	Ozark	8	3,208	185.62	17:1	$9,142
Daleville City	Daleville	3	1,138	63.00	18:1	$8,993
Dallas County	Selma	12	2,701	175.29	15:1	$11,944
Decatur City	Decatur	20	8,781	543.50	16:1	$11,509
DeKalb County	Rainsville	16	8,525	530.37	16:1	$9,479
Demopolis City	Demopolis	4	2,132	119.75	16:1	$8,992
Dothan City	Dothan	16	8,031	456.03	18:1	$10,478
Elba City	Elba	3	644	42.00	15:1	$11,251
Elmore County	Wetumpka	16	11,519	592.00	19:1	$8,221
Enterprise City	Enterprise	10	6,644	340.00	20:1	$8,737
Escambia County	Brewton	12	4,121	242.57	17:1	$10,479
Etowah County	Gadsden	24	8,504	514.03	17:1	$9,080
Eufaula City	Eufaula	6	6,428	157.35	41:1	$5,033
Fairfield City	Fairfield	6	1,552	81.31	19:1	$10,166
Fayette County	Fayette	6	2,178	130.92	17:1	$10,368
Florence City	Florence	9	4,505	273.82	16:1	$10,911
Fort Payne City	Fort Payne	4	3,482	210.75	17:1	$9,041
Franklin County	Russellville	10	3,602	232.27	16:1	$10,171
Gadsden City	Gadsden	15	4,845	318.38	15:1	$10,323
Geneva City	Geneva	3	1,261	78.00	16:1	$10,357
Geneva County	Geneva	10	2,638	163.67	16:1	$9,759
Greene County	Eutaw	5	953	66.00	14:1	$12,638
Gulf Shores City	Gulf Shores	3	2,226	124.10	18:1	$9,774
Guntersville City	Guntersville	4	1,824	109.56	17:1	$10,669
Hale County	Greensboro	7	2,390	136.50	18:1	$9,311
Haleyville City	Haleyville	4	1,627	106.35	15:1	$9,939
Hartselle City	Hartselle	6	3,546	217.33	16:1	$9,921
Henry County	Abbeville	6	2,472	151.33	16:1	$9,331
Homewood City	Homewood	5	4,200	303.90	14:1	$12,815
Hoover City	Hoover	18	13,640	979.91	14:1	$11,226
Houston County	Dothan	12	6,338	363.68	17:1	$8,630
Huntsville City	Huntsville	46	23,514	1,447.60	16:1	$9,156
Jackson County	Scottsboro	18	5,158	270.28	19:1	$10,232
Jacksonville City	Jacksonville	2	1,654	98.00	17:1	$9,298
Jasper City	Jasper	5	2,605	165.70	16:1	$9,975
Jefferson County	Birmingham	58	35,336	1,993.27	18:1	$9,619
Lamar County	Vernon	5	2,269	134.50	17:1	$8,975
Lanett City	Lanett	3	966	57.00	17:1	$9,867
Lauderdale County	Florence	10	8,038	476.27	17:1	$9,447
Lawrence County	Moulton	13	4,712	285.82	16:1	$10,273
Lee County	Opelika	14	9,310	565.73	16:1	$9,703
Leeds City	Leeds	4	2,097	105.00	20:1	$9,940
Limestone County	Athens	17	13,041	478.65	27:1	$8,299
Linden City	Linden	3	502	32.00	16:1	$11,933
Lowndes County	Hayneville	9	1,241	84.10	15:1	$14,023
Macon County	Tuskegee	7	1,871	104.24	18:1	$12,378
Madison City	Madison	11	11,804	711.04	17:1	$9,706
Madison County	Huntsville	30	19,142	1,019.87	19:1	$9,279
Marengo County	Marengo County	3	960	69.00	14:1	$12,637
Marion County	Hamilton	11	3,255	192.50	17:1	$9,612
Marshall County	Guntersville	15	5,758	298.16	19:1	$10,122
Midfield City	Midfield	4	1,022	57.00	18:1	$13,315
Mobile County	Mobile	91	52,460	2,960.79	18:1	$9,880
Monroe County	Monroeville	9	3,152	194.00	16:1	$10,114
Montgomery County	Montgomery	52	27,399	1,436.00	19:1	$9,424
Morgan County	Decatur	19	7,503	419.01	18:1	$9,898
Mountain Brook City	Mountain Brook	6	4,441	352.57	13:1	$14,307
Muscle Shoals City	Muscle Shoals	7	2,801	154.48	18:1	$10,219
Oneonta City	Oneonta	3	1,434	87.02	16:1	$9,381
Opelika City	Opelika	9	4,714	296.40	16:1	$10,693
Opp City	Opp	3	1,275	85.80	15:1	$10,201
Oxford City	Oxford	7	4,176	273.50	15:1	$10,035
Ozark City	Ozark	6	2,007	112.32	18:1	$9,721
Pelham City Schools	Pelham	4	3,402	188.17	18:1	$9,978
Pell City	Pell City	8	4,028	239.31	17:1	$8,916
Perry County	Marion	2	1,153	68.43	17:1	$12,282
Phenix City	Phenix City	12	7,265	425.08	17:1	$9,147
Pickens County	Carrollton	7	2,374	136.00	17:1	$10,379
Piedmont City	Piedmont	3	1,155	65.29	18:1	$9,559
Pike County	Troy	7	2,177	144.50	15:1	$11,533
Pike Road City	Pike Road	4	2,478	110.50	22:1	$8,258
Randolph County	Wedowee	8	2,029	130.43	16:1	$9,945
Roanoke City	Roanoke	4	1,477	86.00	17:1	$9,328
Russell County	Phenix City	8	3,519	194.00	18:1	$9,956
Russellville City	Russellville	5	2,507	144.50	17:1	$10,109
Saraland	Saraland	4	3,146	180.75	17:1	$9,566
Satsuma City	Satsuma	2	1,511	85.00	18:1	$9,220
Scottsboro City	Scottsboro	5	2,442	146.75	17:1	$10,325
Selma City	Selma	11	2,784	141.00	20:1	$10,991
Sheffield City	Sheffield	4	1,019	73.60	14:1	$12,269
Shelby County	Columbiana	31	20,438	1,227.00	17:1	$9,990
St Clair County	Ashville	20	9,407	539.19	17:1	$8,706
Sumter County	Livingston	5	1,194	74.50	16:1	$12,224
Sylacauga City	Sylacauga	4	2,091	117.50	18:1	$10,162
Talladega City	Talladega	7	1,840	106.25	17:1	$10,608
Talladega County	Talladega	18	7,034	400.80	18:1	$9,984
Tallapoosa County	Dadeville	6	2,767	158.80	17:1	$9,521
Tallassee City	Tallassee	3	1,680	98.00	17:1	$10,358
Tarrant City	Tarrant	3	1,227	75.00	16:1	$10,983
Thomasville City	Thomasville	3	1,104	65.52	17:1	$10,438
Troy City	Troy	4	1,682	103.95	16:1	$9,747
Trussville City	Trussville	5	4,816	275.39	17:1	$10,214
Tuscaloosa City	Tuscaloosa	26	10,744	664.66	16:1	$10,515
Tuscaloosa County	Tuscaloosa	35	18,766	1,069.59	18:1	$8,567
Tuscumbia City	Tuscumbia	6	1,478	91.75	16:1	$10,404
Vestavia Hills City	Vestavia Hills	9	7,087	456.00	16:1	$12,600
Walker County	Jasper	18	7,176	431.00	17:1	$9,729
Washington County	Chatom	8	2,612	156.42	17:1	$9,849
Wilcox County	Camden	6	1,400	92.00	15:1	$12,880
Winfield City	Winfield	3	1,280	78.28	16:1	$10,036
Winston County	Double Springs	10	2,272	132.90	17:1	$10,608
