= Straughn =

Straughn may refer to:

- Straughn, Alabama
  - Straughn High School
- Straughn, Indiana
- Straughn (surname)
