= Tornado outbreak of November 14–16, 2006 =

Weather event in the United States

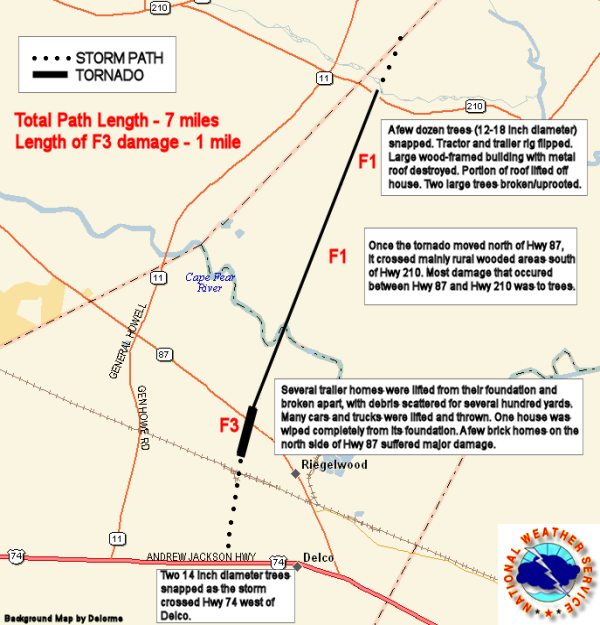
- Path of the Riegelwood Tornado.

Meteorological history
- Duration: November 14–16, 2006

Tornado outbreak
- Tornadoes: 32 confirmed
- Max. rating: F3 tornado
- Duration: 27 hours, 47 minutes

Overall effects
- Casualties: 10 fatalities (+ 3 non-tornadic), 48 injuries
- Damage: $10.5 million (NCDC figures)
- Areas affected: Southern United States, New York
- Part of the tornado outbreaks of 2006

From November 15 to 16, 2006, a major late-season tornado outbreak occurred across the Southern United States and into the Mid-Atlantic States. Ten people were killed by the many tornadoes that damaged many communities. The bulk of the tornadoes took place on November 15, but the deadliest tornado took place on the morning of November 16 in southern North Carolina. In total, 32 tornadoes were confirmed. Additionally, this was the last outbreak that used the original Fujita scale for measuring tornado intensity, as it was being superseded by the Enhanced (EF) scale in January 2007.

== Meteorological synopsis ==
A moderate risk of severe weather was issued by the Storm Prediction Center for a large section of the Southeast for the night of the November 14 into November 15. The outbreak took place along a sharp cold front that tracked across the entire region from west to east. The activity started in the overnight hours in Louisiana and Arkansas and tracked eastward, producing scattered tornadoes across the entire Gulf Coast and into the Carolinas over the next 36 hours. The most severe tornadoes took place in St. Helena Parish, Louisiana where one person was killed in a trailer, near Sumrall, Mississippi where an F3 tornado led to severe damage and numerous injuries, and in Montgomery, Alabama where an indoor roller skating park was destroyed with 30 children inside (but no serious injuries occurred there). When the line crossed into Georgia and northern Florida, it formed into a squall line. However, breaks in the squall line allowed supercells to form in the overnight hours, and early on the 16th, the deadly tornado in southern North Carolina formed at the end of the outbreak.

== Confirmed tornadoes ==
Confirmed tornadoes by Fujita rating
FU	F0	F1	F2	F3	F4	F5	Total
0	3	20	6	3	0	0	32

=== November 15 event ===
F#	Location	County/Parish	Time (UTC)	Path length	Damage
Louisiana
F2	NE of Montpelier to NW of Arcola	St. Helena, Tangipahoa	0750	5.5 miles (9 km)	1 death - At the beginning of the path, a house and a travel trailer were destroyed, fatally injuring one person in the travel trailer. The tornado continued northeast with damage primarily to trees, power lines, and house roofs. At the end of the path near Arcola, four structures sustained major damage and two homes were destroyed. 2 people were injured.
F1	N of Buras	Plaquemines	unknown	unknown	Several trailers were damaged.
F2	W of Thomas to NE of Sandy Hook, MS	Washington, Walthall (MS), Marion (MS)	unknown	unknown	Several mobile homes were damaged, and trees and power lines were blown down in Louisiana before the tornado crossed into Mississippi, where 11 structures had major damage and 5 had minor damage near Flowers. Mobile homes were destroyed and roofs were torn off of homes in that area. Numerous trees and power lines were downed further along the path before the tornado dissipated. One person was injured.
Mississippi
F3	SW of Sumrall to NW of Rawls Springs	Lamar, Forrest	0830	13 miles (21 km)	Near Sumrall, 25 homes were damaged, 16 of which suffered major damage or total destruction. A block foundation home was swept completely away, and a mini-van was thrown 150 yards into a tractor and destroyed. Many trees were snapped, denuded, and partially debarked along the path. 6 people were injured.
F3	SE of Laurel	Jones, Wayne	0931	10.5 miles (17 km)	Two metal high-tension towers were destroyed, hundreds of trees were snapped and uprooted, at least two mobile homes were destroyed, a travel trailer being used for Hurricane Katrina housing was obliterated, and several houses suffered significant structural damage. A mobile home and a large shed were completely destroyed near the end of the path as well. One person was injured.
F1	E of Laurel	Jones	0940	0.75 mile (1.2 km)	Satellite tornado to the previous tornado. Damage was limited to numerous trees that were blown down.
F1	NW of Purvis	Lamar	0950	1 mile (1.6 km)	Tornado destroyed an outbuilding and took the roof off of a large shed. Numerous pine trees were also snapped or blown down along the path.
F1	Avera to SW of Bothwell	Greene	1057	4.5 miles (7 km)	Homes sustained roof damage and a church had part of its roof torn off. Many trees were downed along the path.
F1	N of Ocean Springs	Jackson	unknown	unknown	An elementary school sustained roof damage and power lines were downed.
Arkansas
F1	Brinkley	Monroe	0950	6.5 miles (10 km)	Damage was reported to about 50 houses and businesses. Four silos and an outbuilding were destroyed, and extensive tree and power line damage occurred.
Alabama
F1	E of Jordan to S of Bigbee	Washington	1140	8 miles (12.8 km)	Numerous homes had roof damage and many trees were downed. One horse was killed and several others were injured when the tornado damaged a stable.
F1	Fleta to NW of Pintlala	Montgomery	1603	5.7 miles (9.2 km)	Numerous trees were snapped off just south of the Pintlala Elementary School, and 10 buildings north of the school were damaged.
F2	Montgomery	Montgomery	1630	6.8 miles (11 km)	Tornado struck the east side of Montgomery. Initially, the tornado snapped many trees and caused minor roof damage to numerous homes in several subdivisions. At the city post office, the main doors of building were blown in and portions of the roof were lifted off to the north. A tractor trailer in the parking lot was moved 30 yards and flipped over, and other postal vehicles and cars in the parking lot were moved or received significant damage. The nearby Fun Zone Skating Rink was completely destroyed with many children inside (though none were seriously injured). Several vehicles were crushed by debris or tossed around at that location. Some metal power poles were downed, and an apartment complex lost sections of its roof and second story before the tornado dissipated. 6 people were injured.
F1	E of Ware	Elmore	1645	1.5 miles (2.4 km)	A home sustained substantial roof damage, which was shifted 3 inches. Trees and tree limbs were snapped as well.
F1	W of Kent	Elmore	1705	5 miles (8 km)	A roof was blown off of a house and several trees were blown down along the path.
F0	W of Reeltown	Tallapoosa	1720	100 yds (90 m)	A mobile home sustained siding damage, and 3 outbuildings sustained significant damage. Several trees were blown down or snapped as well.
F2	E of Green Bay to W of Eoda	Covington	1730	15 miles (24 km)	At the beginning of the path, two large grain bins were torn from their foundations, one of which was found 150 yards from where it originated. A nearby outbuilding was picked up and smashed into a house, resulting in considerable damage to the house. Other homes further along the path sustained roof damage. Worst damage occurred near Opine, where six commercial poultry farm buildings were destroyed or heavily damaged and 130,000 chickens were killed.
F2	NW of Roeton to NW of Louisville	Coffee, Pike, Barbour	1817	17.8 miles (29 km)	Worst damage occurred in the Hamilton Crossroads area. Several homes and a fire department building sustained significant damage, and a water tower collapsed. Many trees were downed along the path.
F1	NW of Lafayette	Chambers	1829	0.75 mile (1.2 km)	Numerous large trees were knocked onto a home, several sheds were destroyed, and a large trailer was blown over.
F1	NE of Elba	Coffee	unknown	unknown	A collection tank and four roll-off containers were damaged at a county landfill, a home lost its front porch and roof, and several trailers. Numerous trees and power lines were downed. Several mobile homes and sheds were destroyed, and two people were injured.
F1	S of Newville	Henry	unknown	unknown	A yeast facility was heavily damaged and a nearby warehouse sustained lesser damage. Numerous trees were downed along the path.
F1	W of Mount Andrew	Barbour	1855	unknown	One house sustained roof and wall damage, and a tree was snapped from this brief touchdown.
F1	SE of Dyas	Baldwin	1509	1.5 miles (2.4 km)	Two sheds, a barn, a horse pen, and a screened in porch were destroyed, with debris scattered up to a half-mile away. A house sustained considerable roof damage.
F0	NE of Rabun	Baldwin	1448	1 mile (1.6 km)	Tornado blew down several trees.
Georgia
F1	Fort Benning	Chattahoochee, Muscogee	1915	1.75 miles (2.8 km)	Considerable damage occurred at the Army base. 10 World War II warehouses were heavily damaged, an 18-wheel truck was flipped over, and two vehicles were damaged from debris. Several trees and power lines were also down in the area. Six homes were also damaged in the McDonald Manor Housing Area from large downed trees and limbs. Nine minor injuries were reported in this area as a result of flying or falling debris.
North Carolina
F1	N of Cramerton	Gaston	0358	150 yds (135 m)	Tornado damaged the West Cramerton Baptist Church, removing several shingles, damaging stained glass windows, knocking off the steeple and blowing off the front door.
F0	N of Lincolnton	Lincoln	0415	unknown	Brief tornado. No further details available.
F2	E of Denver	Lincoln	0420	unknown	Substantial damage reported on the west side of Lake Norman. Hundreds of trees were downed, many blocking roads, with some down on homes.
F1	E of Statesville	Iredell	0442	6 miles (9.6 km)	1 death - Many trees were downed, some of which landed on mobile homes. One mobile home and a metal garage were completely destroyed. Another mobile home was flipped off of its foundation, and another was shifted several feet. A 62-year-old man was severely injured in one of the homes when a refrigerator fell on him. He died on December 3 due to complications from the injuries. One other person was injured.
Sources: SPC Storm Reports (Overnight), SPC Storm Reports (Daytime), Jackson office, Little Rock office, Birmingham office, Greenville-Spartanburg office, Mobile office, Peachtree City office, New Orleans office

=== November 16 event ===
F#	Location	County	Time (UTC)	Path length	Damage
New York
F1	N of Erin	Chemung	unknown	unknown	Numerous trees were blown down and a garage collapsed.
South Carolina
F1	SE of Manning	Clarendon	0619	15 miles (24 km)	Intermittent tornado downed several trees.
North Carolina
F3	Riegelwood area	Columbus, Pender	1137	7 miles (11 km)	8 deaths - Tornado first clipped the west edge of Riegelwood, where numerous mobile homes were destroyed and scattered, many vehicles were thrown and mangled, and a block foundation home was swept completely away. Several brick homes sustained major damage as well. Further along the path, the tornado snapped numerous trees, flipped a tractor-trailer, tore part of the roof from a house, and destroyed a large wood-frame building with a metal roof before dissipating. 20 people were injured.
Sources: SPC Storm Reports (Overnight), Wilmington office

== Non-tornadic events ==
Three other deaths occurred that were not related to tornadoes; one was a utility worker that was electrocuted checking downed power lines in South Carolina and two were in car crashes in North Carolina related to severe thunderstorms.

== See also ==
- List of North American tornadoes and tornado outbreaks
