= Opp Cottage =

- U.S. National Register of Historic Places
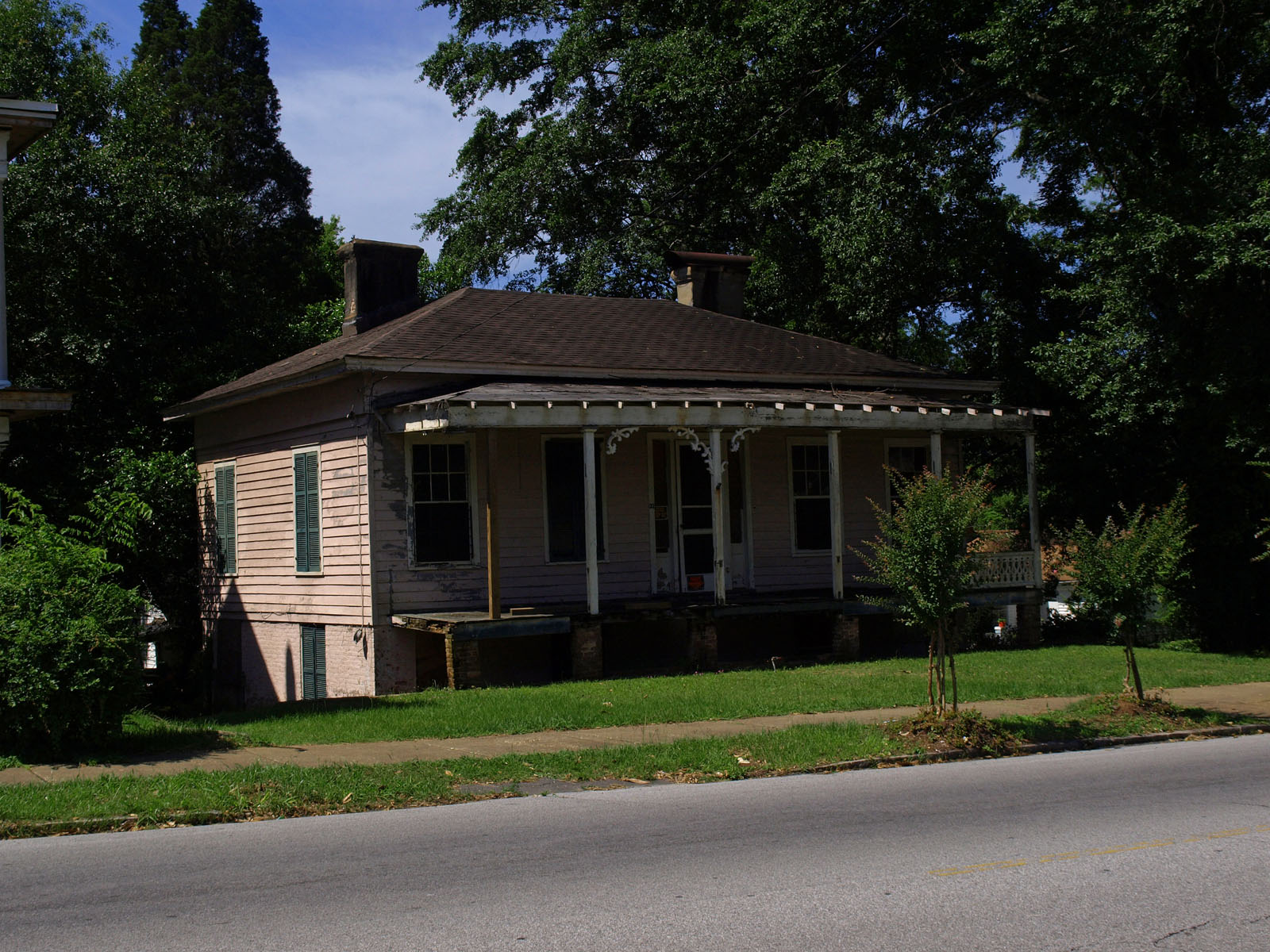
- The house in May 2009

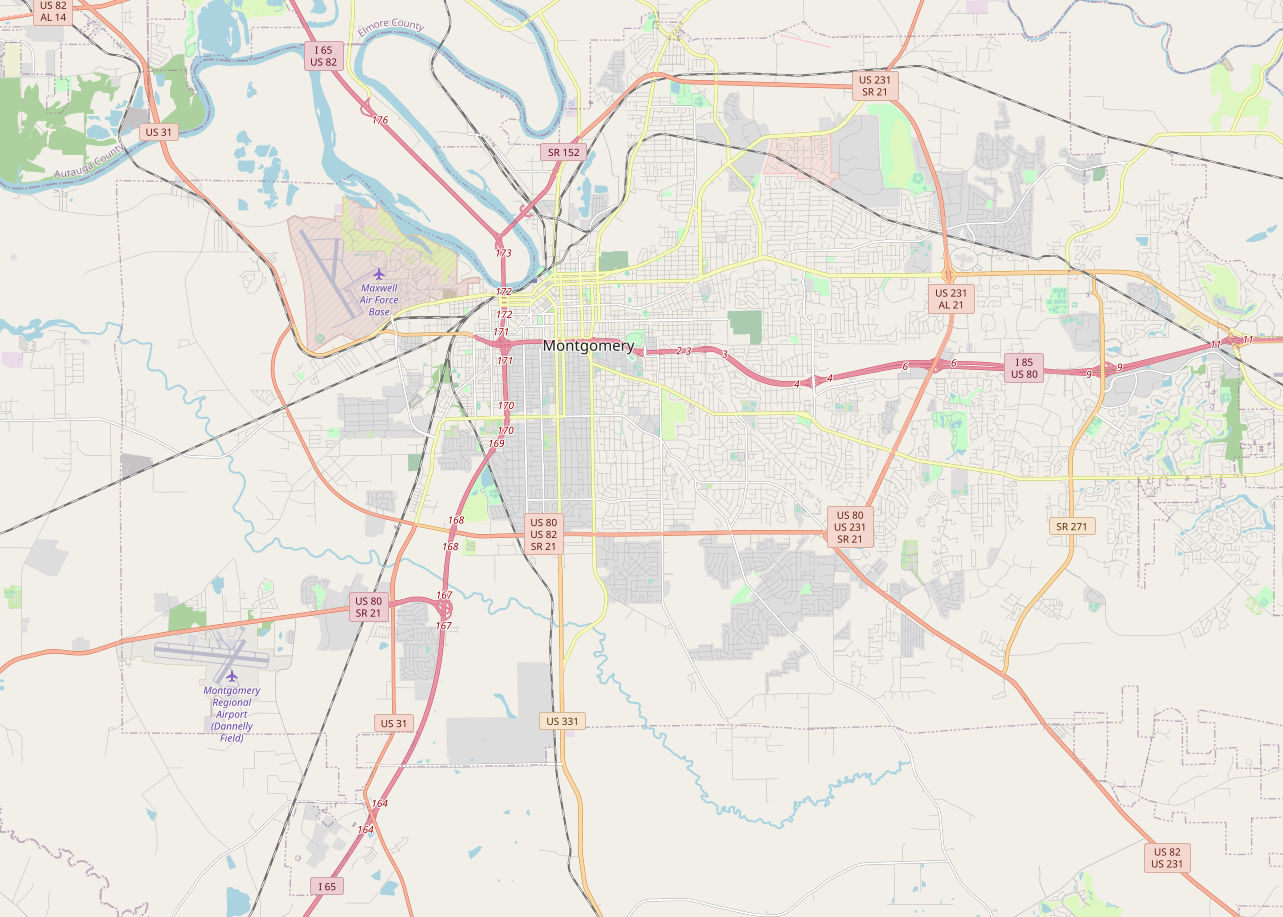
- Location within Montgomery, Alabama Location within Alabama Location within the United States
- Location: 33 W. Jefferson Davis Ave., Montgomery, Alabama
- Coordinates: 32°21′57″N 86°18′36″W
- Area: less than one acre
- Built: 1866
- Architectural style: Raised Cottage
- NRHP reference No.: 76000351
- Added to NRHP: May 4, 1976

Opp Cottage is a historic residence in Montgomery, Alabama. T. J. and Eliza Wilson began construction on the house in 1860, but it was not completed until 1866, after it was sold to Valentine Opp. Opp was an immigrant from Austria who initially settled in Lowndes County, Alabama, and came to Montgomery after the Civil War. Opp operated a successful tailoring business. Opp's son Henry became a lawyer, the county solicitor of Covington County, and mayor of Andalusia. As attorney for the Louisville and Nashville Railroad, he was instrumental in extending the railroad through the present-day town of Opp, which was named in his honor.

The house is a raised cottage, built on a sloping lot, with the lower story not visible from the street. The five-bay façade has a full-width front porch, which originally had ornate fretwork along its balustrade and column brackets. Two wide, interior chimneys punctuate the hipped roof. All windows are six-over-six double hung sashes and originally had shutters. The interior is laid out in a center-hall plan, with a parlor and smaller room on each side. A small room behind the hall contains a staircase and access to the two-story rear portico (no longer extant). Four further rooms are found on the bottom floor.

The house was listed on the National Register of Historic Places in 1976.

As of March 2025, the City of Montgomery is planning to demolish the house as part of their blight reduction program.
