= Sanford, Alabama =

- Town
- Location of Sanford in Covington County, Alabama.
- Coordinates: 31°18′02″N 86°23′51″W
- Country: United States
- State: Alabama
- County: Covington

Area
  - Total: 4.22 sq mi (10.93 km^{2})
  - Land: 4.18 sq mi (10.82 km^{2})
  - Water: 0.042 sq mi (0.11 km^{2})
- Elevation: 295 ft (90 m)

Population (2020)
  - Total: 257
  - Density: 61.5/sq mi (23.75/km^{2})
- Time zone: UTC-6 (Central (CST))
  - Summer (DST): UTC-5 (CDT)
- FIPS code: 01-68016
- GNIS feature ID: 2407286

Sanford is a town in Covington County, Alabama, United States. At the 2020 census, the population was 257. Sanford was originally incorporated in 1902 and was on the 1910 U.S. Census. It did not appear again on the census until 1960.

== Geography ==
Sanford is located near the center of Covington County between the cities of Andalusia and Opp.

According to the U.S. Census Bureau, the town has a total area of 4.2 square miles (10.9 km^{2}), of which 0.04 square miles (0.1 km^{2}), or 1.00%, is water.

== Demographics ==
Historical population
Census	Pop.	Note	%±
1910	742		—
1960	247		—
1970	256		3.6%
1980	250		−2.3%
1990	282		12.8%
2000	269		−4.6%
2010	241		−10.4%
2020	257		6.6%
U.S. Decennial Census; 2013 Estimate

As of the 2000 census, there were 269 people, 112 households, and 77 families residing in the town. The population density was 67.3 inhabitants per square mile (26.0/km^{2}). There were 135 housing units at an average density of 33.8 per square mile (13.1/km^{2}). The racial makeup of the town was 97.77% White, 0.74% Native American, and 1.49% from two or more races. 1.86% of the population were Hispanic or Latino of any race.

There were 112 households, out of which 36.6% had children under the age of 18 living with them, 58.0% were married couples living together, 5.4% had a female householder with no husband present, and 30.4% were non-families. 26.8% of all households were made up of individuals, and 12.5% had someone living alone who was 65 years of age or older. The average household size was 2.40 and the average family size was 2.95.

In the town, the population was spread out, with 24.9% under the age of 18, 8.2% from 18 to 24, 30.1% from 25 to 44, 21.6% from 45 to 64, and 15.2% who were 65 years of age or older. The median age was 39 years. For every 100 females, there were 110.2 males. For every 100 females age 18 and over, there were 106.1 males.

The median income for a household in the town was $20,139, and the median income for a family was $25,313. Males had a median income of $19,844 versus $13,333 for females. The per capita income for the town was $10,558. About 19.1% of families and 19.1% of the population were below the poverty line, including 20.8% of those under the age of eighteen and 11.6% of those 65 or over.

== Education ==
It is within the Covington County Board of Education school district.
