= Seth Hammett =

American politician (born 1946)

Seth Merrill Hammett

64th Speaker of the Alabama House of Representatives
- In office 1999 – November 3, 2010
- Preceded by: James S. Clark
- Succeeded by: Mike Hubbard

Member of the Alabama House of Representatives from the 92nd district
- In office 1979–2011
- Preceded by: Frank Jackson

Personal details
- Born: June 24, 1946 (age 80) Andalusia, Alabama, U.S.
- Party: Democratic
- Spouse: Nancy
- Children: 2
- Website: House Profile

Seth Merrill Hammett (born June 24, 1946) is an American educator, politician, and economic development professional who was a member of the Alabama House of Representatives from 1979 to 2011. A member of the Democratic Party, he served as Speaker of the Alabama House of Representatives from 2001 to 2010.

Hammett did not seek reelection in 2010. Following his retirement, Hammett was selected by Republican Governor Robert Bentley to serve as director of the Alabama Development Office, now known as the Alabama Department of Commerce. Hammett later served as Governor Bentley's chief of staff from 2014 to 2015.

As of 2018, Hammett is vice president of business development for PowerSouth Energy Cooperative and chairman of the Energy Institute of Alabama.

== Academic and business career ==
Hammett was born in Andalusia, Alabama and graduated from Straughn High School in 1964. That same year, he entered Auburn University where he obtained undergraduate and Masters of Business Administration degrees. Between earning his undergraduate and business degrees, Hammett served as a pilot in the United States Air Force. As a second lieutenant in 1969, he earned his air force pilot wings at Laredo Air Force Base, Texas. In 1971, he returned to Andalusia as an economics lecturer at Lurleen B. Wallace Community College, which had opened in 1969. He was made dean of the college's business school in 1974.

In 1973, Hammett was selected as president of the Covington County Chamber of Commerce. In 1983 he founded First National Bank of Andalusia (now Wells Fargo). He has since served in numerous business and community positions, most notably returning to Lurleen B. Wallace Community College as its president from 1991 to 2002. In 2002, Hammett was appointed vice president of business development for SouthTrust Bank. In 2004, he was appointed director of economic development for the Alabama Electric Cooperative. Since 2014, Hammett has served as vice president of business development for PowerSouth Energy Cooperative and chairman of the Energy Institute of Alabama.

== Family ==
Hammett continues to reside in Andalusia, Alabama with his wife, Nancy, where they are members of the First United Methodist Church of Andalusia. They have two children and two grandchildren. He is the second cousin of Matthew Hammett, also a member of the house for the 92nd district.

== Political career ==
Hammett was first elected to the Alabama House of Representatives in November 1978. He ran against Mike Purnell (now the mayor of Red Level, Alabama) and received 67.7% of the vote. Since 1978, Hammett has run unopposed in three of six elections and never received less than 56% of the vote.

In the 2002 election, he ran against Roger Broxton, president of the Confederate Heritage Fund and an outspoken proponent for the protection of confederate history. Hammett won with more than 70% of the vote.

Election Results
Year	Opponent	% Vote for Hammett
1978	Mike Purnell	67.7%
1982	Louie Grimes	60.4%
1986	Unopposed
1990	Unopposed
1994	B. Martin and D. Phillips	56.3%
1998	Unopposed
2002	Roger Broxton	70.3%

Hammett also led a delegation on behalf of the governor to South America to encourage trade between Alabama businesses and South American businesses. The trade mission visited Chile and Brazil and was successful in increasing port service and commercial trade between South America and Alabama and in developing educational programs linking South American universities with Alabamian universities (https://web.archive.org/web/20060316071555/http://www.ndgi.com/news/2004/20040927.shtml).

One of the dominant issues in Alabama politics in recent years is the lottery. Hammett supports the idea of a lottery for the state.

=== Honors ===
- Citizen of the Year and the Distinguished Service Award in Andalusia
- Guardian of Small Business, awarded by the National Federation of Independent Businesses
- The Legislative Leadership Award, given by the Council for Leaders in Alabama Schools
- The Meritorious Service Award, given by The Montgomery Advertiser
- The Service to Agriculture Award, given by the Alabama Farmers' Federation
- The Children's Hero Award, given by the Alabama Department of Human Resources
- The Legislator of the Year Award, given by Alabama Electric Cities
- The Legislative Award given by the Alabama Association of School Boards
- The Legislator of the Year Award, given by the Alabama Independent Insurance Agents
- Alabama Academy of Honor

=== Affiliations ===
- The board of directors of the State Legislative Leaders Foundation
- The executive committee of the National Speakers Conference
- The management committee of the Southern Legislative Conference
- The executive committee of the Southern Legislative Conference
- The executive committee of the Council of State Governments
- The executive committee of the National Conference of State Legislatures
- Chairman of the Energy Institute of Alabama

=== Positions ===
- Chairman of the 16-state Southern Legislative Conference
- President of the National Speakers Conference
- Speaker of the Alabama House of Representatives
- Founder and first president of the First National (now Wachovia) Bank of Andalusia
- President emeritus of Lurleen B. Wallace Community College
- Director of Economic Development for Alabama Electric Cooperative (Now PowerSouth Energy Cooperative)
- Vice President of Business Development for PowerSouth Energy Cooperative
