= Libertyville, Alabama =

- Town
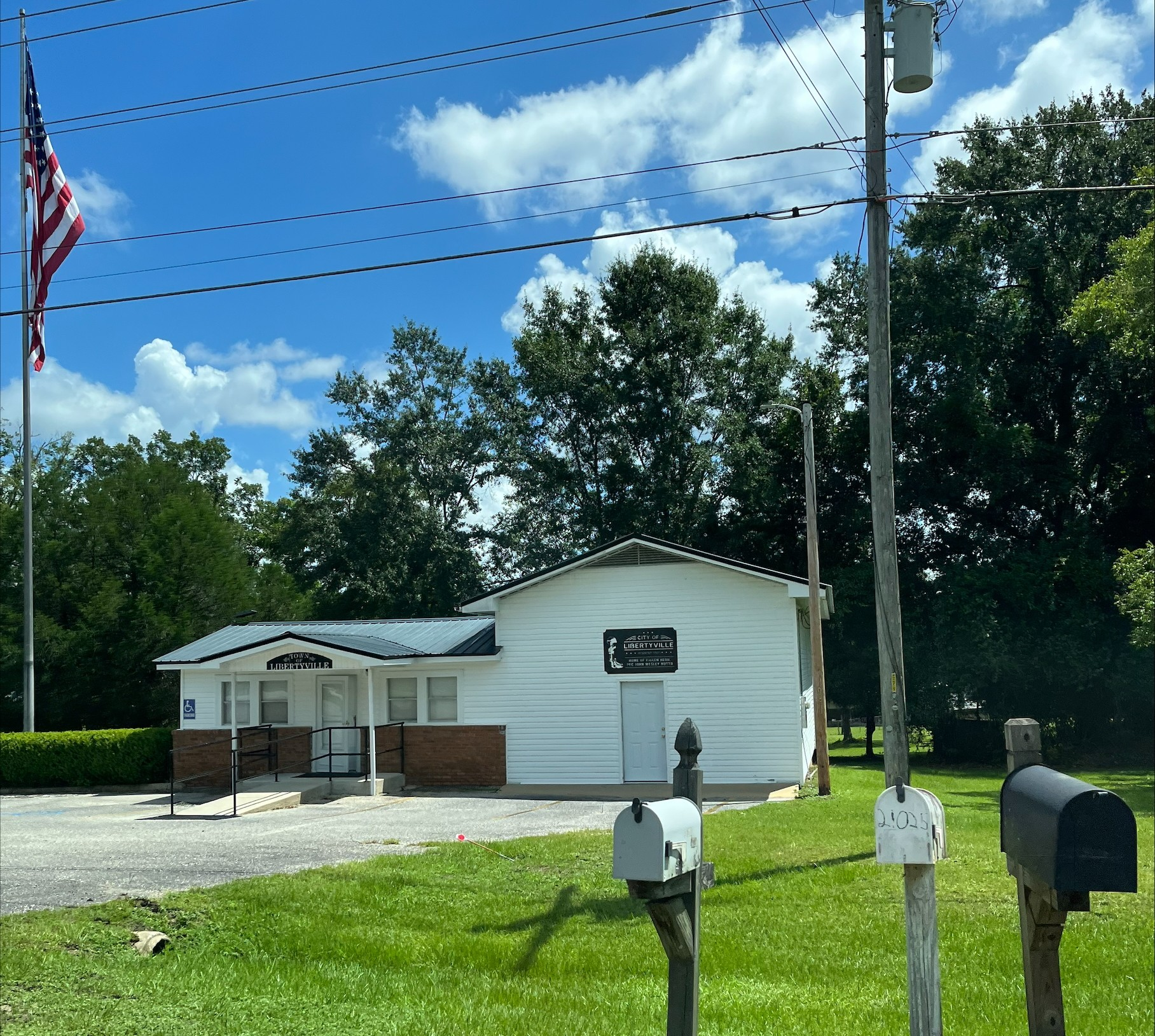
- Libertyville Town Hall

- Location of Libertyville in Covington County, Alabama.
- Coordinates: 31°14′47″N 86°27′46″W
- Country: United States
- State: Alabama
- County: Covington

Area
  - Total: 0.53 sq mi (1.36 km^{2})
  - Land: 0.52 sq mi (1.35 km^{2})
  - Water: 0.0039 sq mi (0.01 km^{2})
- Elevation: 246 ft (75 m)

Population (2020)
  - Total: 108
  - Density: 207.6/sq mi (80.15/km^{2})
- Time zone: UTC-6 (Central (CST))
  - Summer (DST): UTC-5 (CDT)
- ZIP code: 36420
- Area code: 334
- FIPS code: 01-42808
- GNIS feature ID: 2406018

Libertyville is a town in Covington County, Alabama, United States. At the 2020 census, the population was 108.

== Geography ==
According to the U.S. Census Bureau, the town has a total area of 0.53 square miles (1.36 km^{2}), of which 0.004 square miles (0.01 km^{2}), or 0.59%, is water. The town is located 5 miles (8 km) south of the center of the city of Andalusia.

== Demographics ==
Historical population
Census	Pop.	Note	%±
1970	141		—
1980	141		0.0%
1990	133		−5.7%
2000	106		−20.3%
2010	117		10.4%
2020	108		−7.7%
U.S. Decennial Census; 2013 Estimate

As of the census of 2000, there were 106 people, 48 households, and 32 families residing in the town. The population density was 202.6 inhabitants per square mile (78.2/km^{2}). There were 55 housing units at an average density of 105.1 per square mile (40.6/km^{2}). The racial makeup of the town was 91.51% White, 3.77% Asian, and 4.72% from two or more races. 0.94% of the population were Hispanic or Latino of any race.

There were 48 households, out of which 25.0% had children under the age of 18 living with them, 54.2% were married couples living together, 12.5% had a female householder with no husband present, and 33.3% were non-families. 27.1% of all households were made up of individuals, and 16.7% had someone living alone who was 65 years of age or older. The average household size was 2.21 and the average family size was 2.72.

In the town, the population was spread out, with 17.9% under the age of 18, 11.3% from 18 to 24, 27.4% from 25 to 44, 26.4% from 45 to 64, and 17.0% who were 65 years of age or older. The median age was 41 years. For every 100 females, there were 96.3 males. For every 100 females aged 18 and over, there were 81.3 males.

The median income for a household in the town was $19,750, and the median income for a family was $37,500. Males had a median income of $17,917 versus $19,250 for females. The per capita income for the town was $26,427. There were 16.7% of families and 20.7% of the population living below the poverty line, including 28.6% of under eighteens and 28.6% of those over 64.

== Education ==
It is within the Covington County Board of Education school district.
