= Loango =

Loango may refer to:

== Places ==
- Loango, Republic of Congo, a town in the Republic of the Congo
  - Loango slavery harbour is a Republic of the Congo cultural site included in World Heritage Tentative Lists in 2008
- Loango National Park, a national park in Western Gabon
- Petit Loango, a town in Gabon
- Kingdom of Loango, a pre-colonial state in what is now the Republic of the Congo
- Loango, Alabama

== Other ==
- Loango (schooner), a schooner wrecked in 1909 at St Ives, Cornwall
- Loango weaver (Ploceus subpersonatus), a species of bird
