= Harlan Elementary School =

Harlan Elementary School may refer to:

- W.S. Harlan Elementary School - Lockhart, Alabama
- David W. Harlan Elementary School - Wilmington, Delaware (Philadelphia metropolitan area) - Brandywine School District
- Harlan Elementary School - Bloomfield Township, Michigan (Detroit metropolitan area) - Birmingham Public Schools
