= Beda, Alabama =

Unincorporated community in Alabama, United States

- Unincorporated community
- Location within Alabama Location within the United States
- Coordinates: 31°03′04″N 86°34′58″W
- Country: United States
- State: Alabama
- County: Covington
- Elevation: 246 ft (75 m)
- Time zone: UTC-6 (Central (CST))
  - Summer (DST): UTC-5 (CDT)
- Area code: 334
- GNIS feature ID: 156042

Beda is an unincorporated community in Covington County, Alabama, United States. Beda is located on Alabama State Route 137, 18.2 miles (29.3 km) south-southeast of Andalusia. The community lies entirely within the Conecuh National Forest.

== History ==
A post office operated under the name Beda from 1886 to 1897.
