= Onycha, Alabama =

- Town
- Location of Onycha in Covington County, Alabama.
- Coordinates: 31°13′29″N 86°16′43″W
- Country: United States
- State: Alabama
- County: Covington

Area
  - Total: 0.80 sq mi (2.08 km^{2})
  - Land: 0.79 sq mi (2.05 km^{2})
  - Water: 0.0077 sq mi (0.02 km^{2})
- Elevation: 322 ft (98 m)

Population (2020)
  - Total: 167
  - Density: 210.9/sq mi (81.43/km^{2})
- Time zone: UTC-6 (Central (CST))
  - Summer (DST): UTC-5 (CDT)
- FIPS code: 01-57024
- GNIS feature ID: 2407049

Onycha is a town in Covington County, Alabama, United States. At the 2020 census, the population was 167.

== Geography ==
Onycha is located in eastern Covington County. According to the U.S. Census Bureau, the town has a total area of 0.81 square miles (2.1 km^{2}), of which 0.008 square miles (0.02 km^{2}), or 1.18%, is water.

== Demographics ==
Historical population
Census	Pop.	Note	%±
1970	118		—
1980	147		24.6%
1990	150		2.0%
2000	208		38.7%
2010	184		−11.5%
2020	167		−9.2%
U.S. Decennial Census; 2013 Estimate

As of the census of 2000, there were 208 people, 96 households, and 64 families residing in the town. The population density was 249.1 inhabitants per square mile (96.2/km^{2}). There were 113 housing units at an average density of 135.3 per square mile (52.2/km^{2}). The racial makeup of the town was 99.04% White and 0.96% Native American. 0.48% of the population were Hispanic or Latino of any race.

There were 96 households, out of which 19.8% had children under the age of 18 living with them, 56.3% were married couples living together, 7.3% had a female householder with no husband present, and 33.3% were non-families. 32.3% of all households were made up of individuals, and 8.3% had someone living alone who was 65 years of age or older. The average household size was 2.17 and the average family size was 2.72.

In the town, the population was spread out, with 16.8% under the age of 18, 7.7% from 18 to 24, 29.3% from 25 to 44, 29.8% from 45 to 64, and 16.3% who were 65 years of age or older. The median age was 42 years. For every 100 females, there were 103.9 males. For every 100 females age 18 and over, there were 108.4 males.

The median income for a household in the town was $17,500, and the median income for a family was $29,688. Males had a median income of $29,375 versus $12,143 for females. The per capita income for the town was $12,530. About 11.5% of families and 15.9% of the population were below the poverty line, including 18.9% of those under the age of eighteen and 8.1% of those 65 or over.

== Education ==
It is within the Covington County Board of Education school district.
