= South, Alabama =

Unincorporated community in Alabama, United States

- Unincorporated community
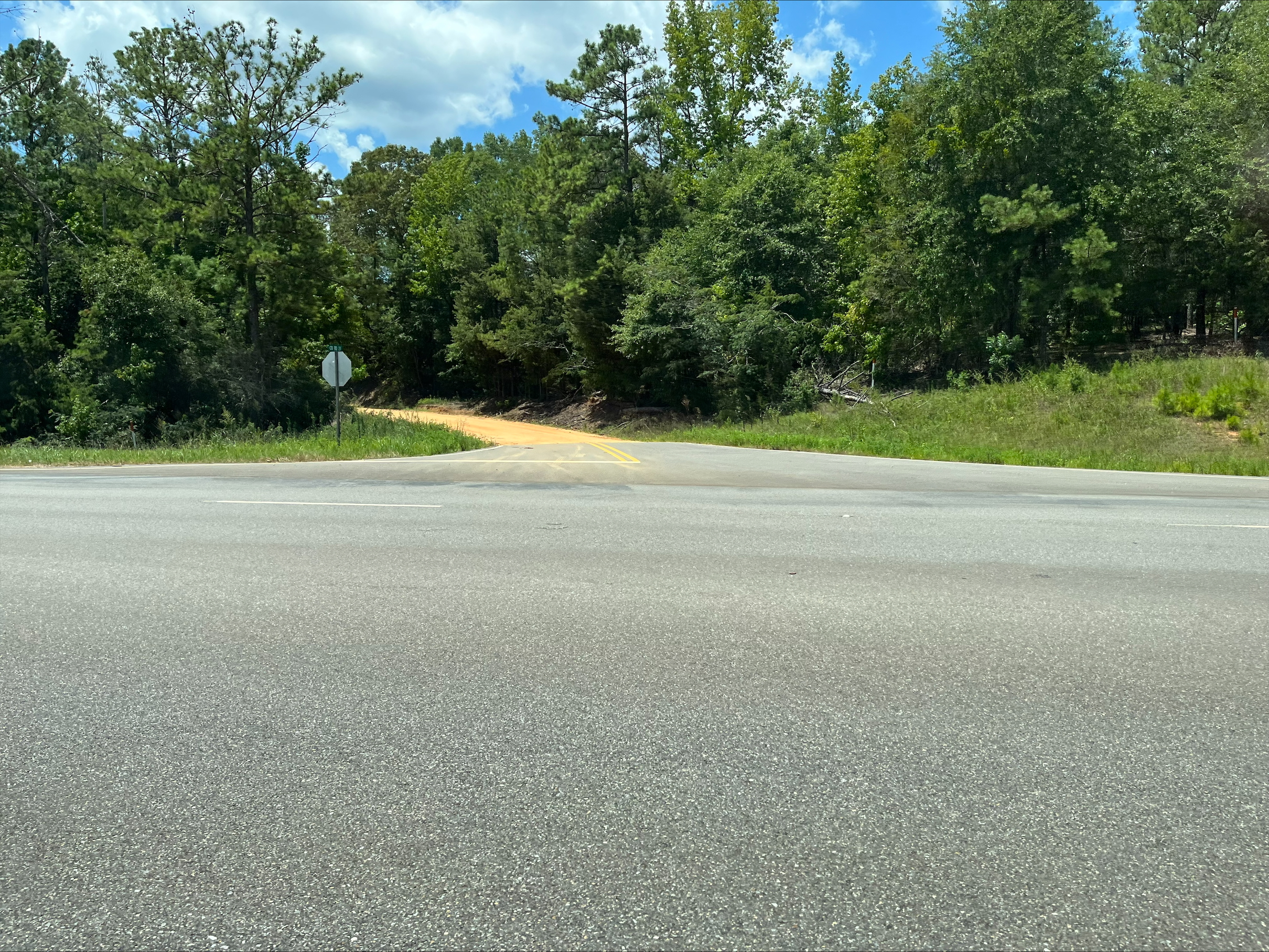
- Intersection along Alabama State Route 55 in South, Alabama

- Location within Alabama Location within the United States
- Coordinates: 31°26′40″N 86°36′47″W
- Country: United States
- State: Alabama
- County: Covington
- Elevation: 384 ft (117 m)
- Time zone: UTC-6 (Central (CST))
  - Summer (DST): UTC-5 (CDT)
- Area code: 334
- GNIS feature ID: 127111

South is an unincorporated community in Covington County, Alabama, United States. South is located on Alabama State Route 55, 2.6 miles (4.2 km) north of Red Level.

== History ==
South may be named for a family or its location in the southern part of Alabama. A post office operated under the name South from 1900 to 1910.
