= Estothel, Alabama =

Unincorporated community in Alabama, United States

- Unincorporated community
- Location within Alabama Location within the United States
- Coordinates: 31°14′41″N 86°11′54″W
- Country: United States
- State: Alabama
- County: Covington
- Elevation: 289 ft (88 m)
- Time zone: UTC-6 (Central (CST))
  - Summer (DST): UTC-5 (CDT)
- Area code: 334
- GNIS feature ID: 154452

Estothel, also known as Gatlin, is an unincorporated community in Covington County, Alabama, United States. Estothel is located on Alabama State Route 52, 2 miles (3.2 km) southeast of Opp.

== History ==
A post office operated under the name Gatlin from 1901 to 1905.
