= Wiggins, Alabama =

Unincorporated community in Alabama, United States

- Unincorporated community
- Location within Alabama Location within the United States
- Coordinates: 31°18′58″N 86°19′43″W
- Country: United States
- State: Alabama
- County: Covington
- Elevation: 315 ft (96 m)
- Time zone: UTC-6 (Central (CST))
  - Summer (DST): UTC-5 (CDT)
- Area code: 334
- GNIS feature ID: 128940

Wiggins is an unincorporated community in Covington County, Alabama, United States. The community now lies within the city limits of Babbie.

== History ==
The community was named for James Wiggins, who served as the first postmaster. A post office operated under the name Wiggins from 1880 to 1904.
