= Straughn High School =

Public high school in Alabama, United States

Location
- 29448 Straughn School Road; Andalusia, Alabama 36421; United States; 31°23′19″N 86°25′00″W

Information
- Type: Public
- Established: 1922 (104 years ago)
- School district: Covington County Schools
- CEEB code: 010100
- NCES School ID: 010093000363
- Principal: Matthew Cobb
- Faculty: 26.00 (FTE)
- Grades: 9 to 12
- Enrollment: 416 (2023–2024)
- Student to teacher ratio: 16.00
- Colors: Black, white, and gold
- Song: "Hail Straughn High" (music: "Annie Lisle")
- Fight song: "Go Tigers" (music: "Notre Dame Victory March")
- Mascot: Tiger
- Website: shs.cov.k12.al.us

Straughn High School is a public school located in the Straughn community near Andalusia in Covington County, Alabama. It is the largest 9th–12th Grade school in the Covington County Schools (CCS) system. It is classified as a 4-A school in the Alabama High School Athletic Association. A school was founded in 1886 as Haygood School which eventually included 9th grade. In 1922 a decision was made to establish Straughn High School.

No Child Left Behind Act Status: Passed Adequate Yearly Progress

== Athletics ==
- Football
- Baseball
- Softball
- Basketball
- Volleyball
- Track and Field

== Notable alumni ==
- Seth Hammett, former Speaker of the Alabama House of Representatives
- Matthew Hammett, Alabama State Representative
