= Babbie, Alabama =

- Town
- Location of Babbie in Covington County, Alabama.
- Coordinates: 31°18′08″N 86°19′23″W
- Country: United States
- State: Alabama
- County: Covington

Government
  - Type: Mayor-Council
  - Mayor: Chris Caldwell

Area
  - Total: 11.59 sq mi (30.01 km^{2})
  - Land: 11.47 sq mi (29.71 km^{2})
  - Water: 0.12 sq mi (0.30 km^{2})
- Elevation: 302 ft (92 m)

Population (2020)
  - Total: 625
  - Density: 54.5/sq mi (21.04/km^{2})
- Time zone: UTC-6 (Central (CST))
  - Summer (DST): UTC-5 (CDT)
- FIPS code: 01-03556
- GNIS feature ID: 2405195

Babbie is a town in Covington County, Alabama, United States. At the 2020 census, the population was 625. It incorporated in 1957.

== Geography ==
Babbie is located in eastern Covington County and is bordered to the east by the city of Opp.

According to the U.S. Census Bureau, the town has a total area of 11.6 square miles (30.0 km^{2}), of which 11.5 square miles (29.7 km^{2}) is land and 0.12 square miles (0.3 km^{2}), or 1.01%, is water.

== Demographics ==
Historical population
Census	Pop.	Note	%±
1960	60		—
1970	82		36.7%
1980	553		574.4%
1990	576		4.2%
2000	627		8.9%
2010	603		−3.8%
2020	625		3.6%
U.S. Decennial Census; 2013 Estimate

=== 2000 Census data ===
At the 2000 census there were 627 people, 258 households, and 192 families in the town. The population density was 54.3 inhabitants per square mile (21.0/km^{2}). There were 284 housing units at an average density of 24.6 per square mile (9.5/km^{2}). The racial makeup of the town was 98.88% White, 0.16% Black or African American, 0.32% Asian, 0.16% from other races, and 0.48% from two or more races.

Of the 258 households 29.1% had children under the age of 18 living with them, 64.0% were married couples living together, 8.9% had a female householder with no husband present, and 25.2% were non-families. 23.6% of households were one person and 7.8% were one person aged 65 or older. The average household size was 2.43 and the average family size was 2.87.

The age distribution was 22.3% under the age of 18, 7.8% from 18 to 24, 30.1% from 25 to 44, 25.5% from 45 to 64, and 14.2% 65 or older. The median age was 39 years. For every 100 females, there were 101.6 males. For every 100 females age 18 and over, there were 94.8 males.

The median household income was $26,328 and the median family income was $31,875. Males had a median income of $27,054 versus $17,000 for females. The per capita income for the town was $13,628. About 16.6% of families and 14.8% of the population were below the poverty line, including 21.6% of those under age 18 and 15.6% of those age 65 or over.

== Education ==
It is within the Covington County Board of Education school district.
