= Horn Hill, Alabama =

- Town
- Location of Horn Hill in Covington County, Alabama.
- Coordinates: 31°14′46″N 86°18′39″W
- Country: United States
- State: Alabama
- County: Covington

Area
  - Total: 2.61 sq mi (6.75 km^{2})
  - Land: 2.56 sq mi (6.62 km^{2})
  - Water: 0.054 sq mi (0.14 km^{2})
- Elevation: 262 ft (80 m)

Population (2020)
  - Total: 207
  - Density: 81.0/sq mi (31.28/km^{2})
- Time zone: UTC-6 (Central (CST))
  - Summer (DST): UTC-5 (CDT)
- FIPS code: 01-36088
- GNIS feature ID: 2405862

Horn Hill is a town in Covington County, Alabama, United States. At the 2020 census, the population was 207. It had previously been an incorporated community and was listed on the 1970 and 1980 U.S. Census, but was disincorporated in 1985. It later reincorporated on August 26, 1991.

== Geography ==
According to the U.S. Census Bureau, the town has a total area of 2.6 square miles (6.8 km^{2}), of which 2.5 square miles (6.6 km^{2}) is land and 0.04 square miles (0.1 km^{2}), or 2.01%, is water.

== Demographics ==
Historical population
Census	Pop.	Note	%±
1970	136		—
1980	186		36.8%
2000	235		—
2010	228		−3.0%
2020	207		−9.2%
U.S. Decennial Census; 2013 Estimate

As of the census of 2000, there were 235 people, 107 households, and 68 families residing in the town. The population density was 88.0 inhabitants per square mile (34.0/km^{2}). There were 126 housing units at an average density of 47.2 per square mile (18.2/km^{2}). The racial makeup of the town was 97.02% White, 1.70% Black or African American and 1.28% Native American. 0.43% of the population were Hispanic or Latino of any race.

There were 107 households, out of which 28.0% had children under the age of 18 living with them, 51.4% were married couples living together, 9.3% had a female householder with no husband present, and 36.4% were non-families. 35.5% of all households were made up of individuals, and 11.2% had someone living alone who was 65 years of age or older. The average household size was 2.20 and the average family size was 2.82.

In the town, the population was spread out, with 23.8% under the age of 18, 9.8% from 18 to 24, 28.9% from 25 to 44, 25.5% from 45 to 64, and 11.9% who were 65 years of age or older. The median age was 35 years. For every 100 females, there were 104.3 males. For every 100 females age 18 and over, there were 108.1 males.

The median income for a household in the town was $25,313, and the median income for a family was $36,667. Males had a median income of $26,964 versus $17,031 for females. The per capita income for the town was $12,898. About 21.0% of families and 22.4% of the population were below the poverty line, including 23.6% of those under the age of eighteen and 31.8% of those 65 or over.

== Education ==
It is within the Covington County Board of Education school district.
