= Rome, Alabama =

Unincorporated community in Alabama, United States

- Unincorporated community
- Location within Alabama Location within the United States
- Coordinates: 31°08′31″N 86°40′08″W
- Country: United States
- State: Alabama
- County: Covington
- Elevation: 315 ft (96 m)
- Time zone: UTC-6 (Central (CST))
  - Summer (DST): UTC-5 (CDT)
- Area code: 334
- GNIS feature ID: 160530

Rome is an unincorporated community in Covington County, Alabama, United States. Rome is located on U.S. Route 29, 14.8 miles (23.8 km) southwest of Andalusia, and is located entirely within the Conecuh National Forest.

== History ==
The community was likely named after Rome, Georgia, which was in turn named for Rome. A post office operated under the name Rome from 1871 to 1907.
