= Wing, Alabama =

Unincorporated community in Alabama, United States

- Unincorporated community
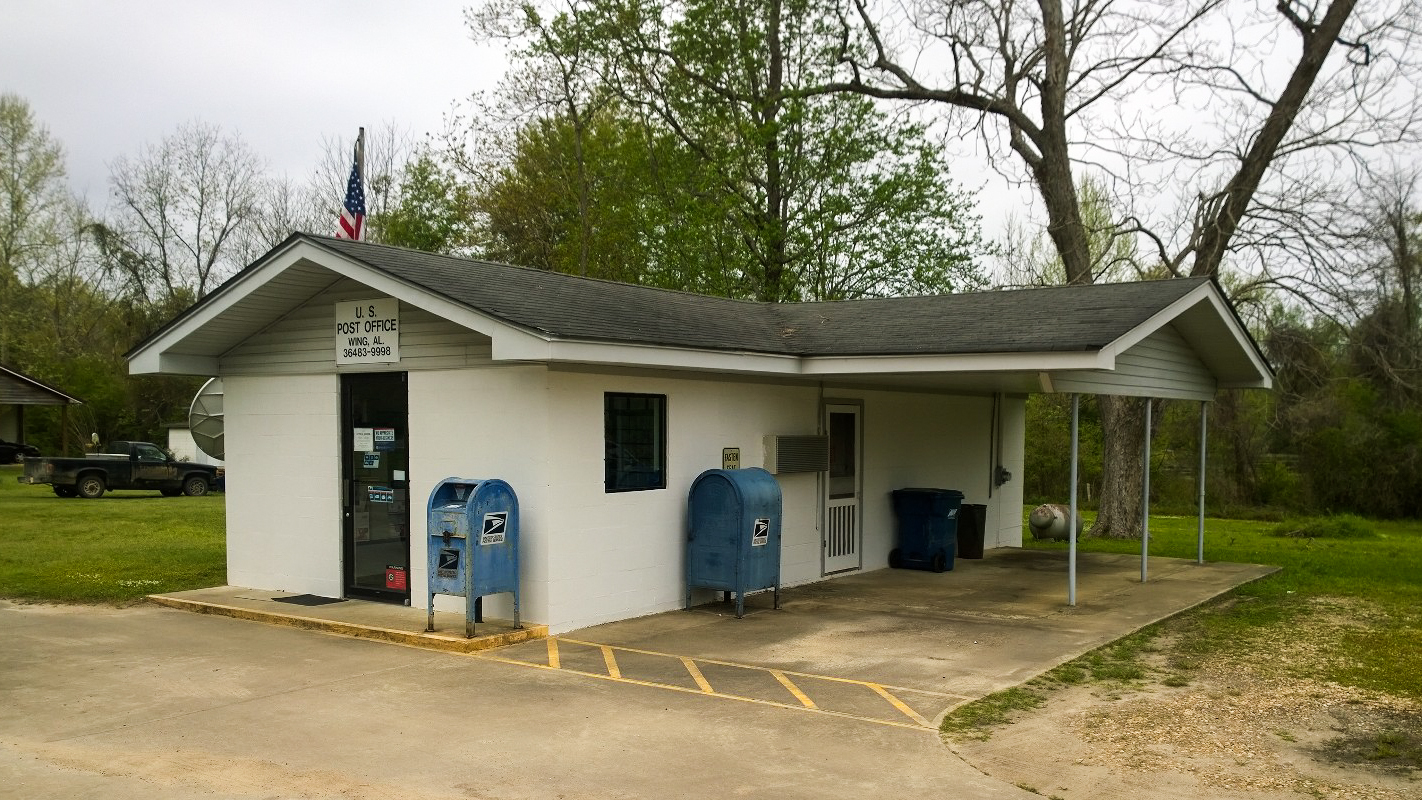
- Post office in Wing

- Location within Alabama Location within the United States
- Coordinates: 31°01′40″N 86°36′38″W
- Country: United States
- State: Alabama
- County: Covington
- Elevation: 266 ft (81 m)
- Time zone: UTC-6 (Central (CST))
  - Summer (DST): UTC-5 (CDT)
- ZIP code: 36483
- Area code: 334
- GNIS feature ID: 129115

Wing is an unincorporated community in Covington County, Alabama, United States.

== Location ==
Wing is located entirely within Conecuh National Forest on Alabama State Route 137, 20.8 miles (33.5 km) south-southwest of Andalusia. Wing has a post office with ZIP code 36483.
