= Chapel Hill, Covington County, Alabama =

Unincorporated community in Alabama, United States

Chapel Hill, Alabama
- Unincorporated community
- Location within Alabama Location within the United States
- Coordinates: 31°01′46″N 86°13′52″W
- Country: United States
- State: Alabama
- County: Covington
- Elevation: 230 ft (70 m)
- Time zone: UTC-6 (Central (CST))
  - Summer (DST): UTC-5 (CDT)
- ZIP code: 36442
- Area code: 334
- GNIS feature ID: 1730327

Chapel Hill is an unincorporated community in Covington County, Alabama, United States, located on State Route 54, northeast of Florala.
