= Charles LeMaistre =

American physician

- Born: Charles Aubrey LeMaistre; February 10, 1924; Lockhart, Alabama
- Died: January 28, 2017 (aged 92); Houston, Texas
- Education: University of Alabama (B.A.); Cornell University (M.D.)
- Known for: Chancellor of the University of Texas System (1971–1978); President of the University of Texas MD Anderson Cancer Center (1978–1996), President Emeritus, the University of Texas MD Anderson Cancer Center
- Scientific career
- Fields: Physician, medical educator and academic administrator

Charles Aubrey "Mickey" LeMaistre (February 10, 1924 – January 28, 2017) was an American physician, medical educator, and academic administrator who served as chancellor of the University of Texas System from 1971 to 1978 and as president of the University of Texas MD Anderson Cancer Center from 1978 to 1996. He also served on the board of directors of the Enron Corporation.

== Biography ==
LeMaistre was born in 1924 in Lockhart, Alabama. He received his Bachelor of Arts degree from the University of Alabama and earned his medical degree from Weill Cornell Medical College of Cornell University in 1947. He did his medical residency in New York Hospital and completed a fellowship in tuberculosis and infectious diseases at Cornell University. He began his career split between teaching at Cornell and in the U. S. Public Health Service, Epidemic Intelligence Service. In 1954, at the age of 29, LeMaistre was offered a department chairmanship at Cornell. Instead he left for Emory University, where he continued his work in infectious diseases and developed a particular interest in prevention. He helped set up a department of preventive medicine and served as its first chairman.

He left Emory in 1959 for the University of Texas Southwestern Medical School as a professor of internal medicine. He later was named associate dean and then became vice chancellor for health affairs. He was elected as chancellor of the University of Texas System in 1971. As chancellor, he directed a huge expansion of the UT System that included new medical schools in Houston and San Antonio and new universities in Dallas, Odessa and San Antonio. In 1978 he was named president of the University of Texas MD Anderson Cancer Center. During his 18-year tenure, M. D. Anderson has become a world leader in outpatient care for cancer patients and has the nation's largest ambulatory treatment and ambulatory surgery programs in cancers. He has served as national president of the American Cancer Society and as president of the Damon Runyon-Walter Winchell Cancer Fund.

LeMaistre retired in 1996, concluding a distinguished medical career after 18 years as president of the University of Texas MD Anderson Cancer Center. He was President Emeritus of the University of Texas MD Anderson Cancer Center, and had an active voluntary patient advocacy with his wife Andreae.

He received many awards, among them, distinguished alumnus awards from the University of Alabama and Cornell University, the President's Award from the American Lung Association and the Gibson D. Lewis Award for Excellence in Cancer Control. He was also chosen Outstanding Texas Leader by the 7th Annual John Ben Sheppard Public Leadership Forum. He was a member of Alabama Academy of Honor. He received numerous honorary degrees in recognition of his achievements in medicine, higher education, and public health. In 2015, LeMaistre was inducted into the Healthcare Hall of Fame.

LeMaistre died on January 28, 2017, in Houston.
