= McRae, Alabama =

Unincorporated community in Alabama, United States

- Unincorporated community
- Location within Alabama Location within the United States
- Coordinates: 31°03′32″N 86°15′41″W
- Country: United States
- State: Alabama
- County: Covington
- Elevation: 230 ft (70 m)
- Time zone: UTC-6 (Central (CST))
  - Summer (DST): UTC-5 (CDT)
- Area code: 334
- GNIS feature ID: 156688

McRae is an unincorporated community in Covington County, Alabama, United States.

== History ==
A post office operated under the name McRae from 1904 to 1912.
