= Alabama State Route 137 =

State highway in Alabama, United States

State Route 137

Route information
- Maintained by ALDOT
- Length: 13.997 mi (22.526 km)

Major junctions
- South end: SR 189 at the Florida state line near Wing
- North end: US 29 southwest of Carolina

Location
- Country: United States
- State: Alabama
- Counties: Covington

Highway system
- Alabama State Highway System; Interstate; US; State
← SR 136	→ SR 138

State Route 137 (SR 137) is a 13.997-mile (22.526 km) state highway that serves as a north–south connection between the Florida state line near Wing and Andalusia. It travels through the southwestern part of Covington County. SR 137 serves as a continuation of Florida State Road 189 (SR 189) upon crossing into Alabama at its southern terminus and ends at US 29 southwest of Carolina.

== Route description ==
SR 137 begins at the Florida state line where SR 189 transitions to SR 137 south of Wing. From this point, SR 137 follows a northerly course through the Conecuh National Forest en route to its northern terminus at US 29 (internally designated as SR 15) southwest of Carolina.

== Major intersections ==
The entire route is in Covington County.

Location	mi	km	Destinations	Notes
	0.000	0.000	SR 189 south – Fort Walton Beach	Florida state line
	13.997	22.526	US 29 (SR 15) – Brewton, Mobile, Andalusia	
1.000 mi = 1.609 km; 1.000 km = 0.621 mi
