= Carolina, Alabama =

- Town
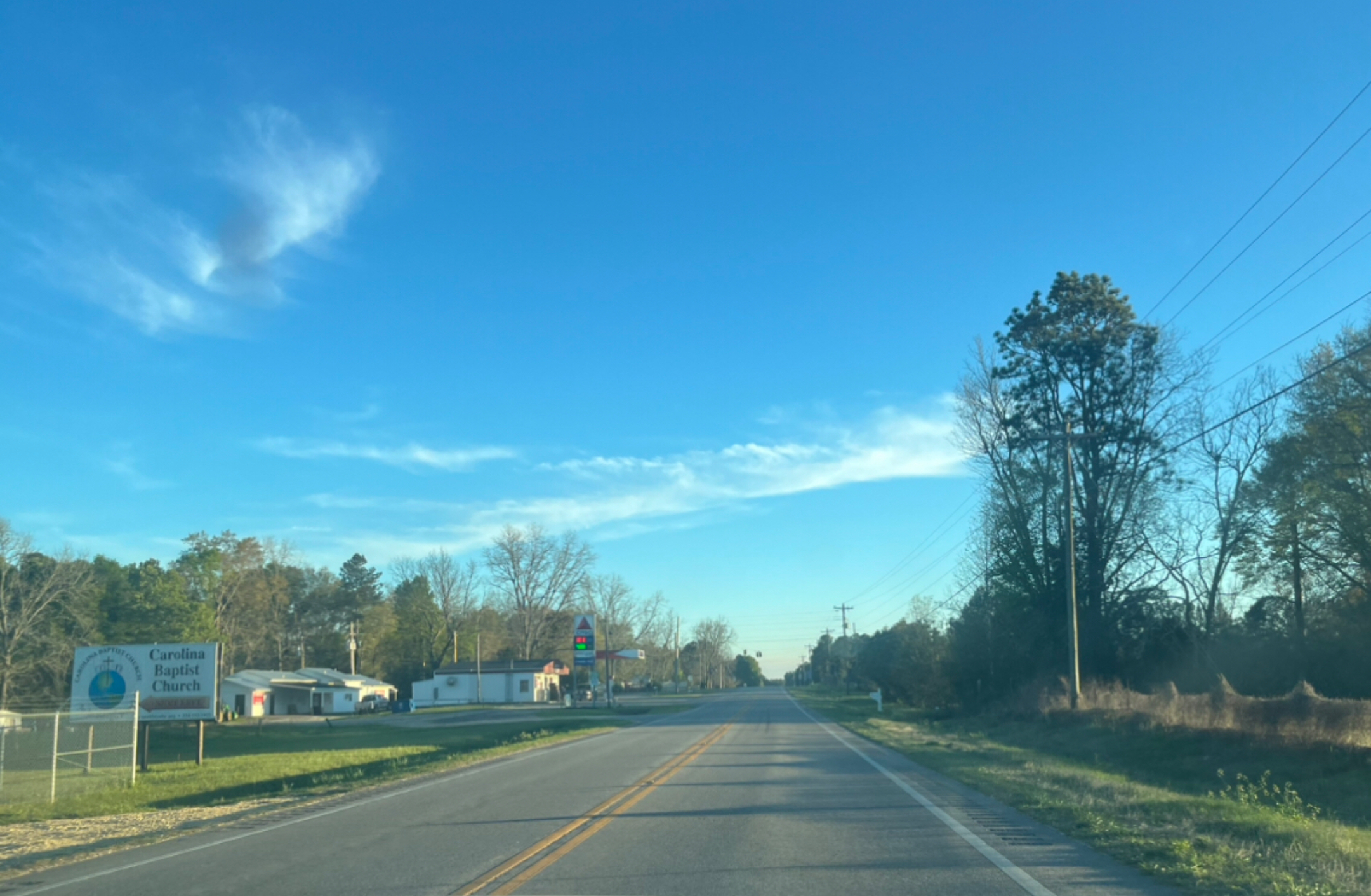
- Carolina pictured on U.S. Route 29 in 2023

- Location of Carolina in Covington County, Alabama.
- Coordinates: 31°14′01″N 86°31′22″W
- Country: United States
- State: Alabama
- County: Covington

Area
  - Total: 1.12 sq mi (2.89 km^{2})
  - Land: 1.11 sq mi (2.87 km^{2})
  - Water: 0.0077 sq mi (0.02 km^{2})
- Elevation: 289 ft (88 m)

Population (2020)
  - Total: 286
  - Density: 258/sq mi (99.6/km^{2})
- Time zone: UTC-6 (Central (CST))
  - Summer (DST): UTC-5 (CDT)
- FIPS code: 01-12160
- GNIS feature ID: 2405380

Carolina is a town in Covington County, Alabama, United States. As of the 2020 census, Carolina had a population of 286. It is located about 95 miles (153 km) south of Montgomery and about 80 miles (130 km) west of Dothan.

== Geography ==
Carolina is located west of the center of Covington County. According to the U.S. Census Bureau, the town has a total area of 1.1 square miles (2.9 km^{2}), of which 0.008 square miles (0.02 km^{2}), or 0.71%, is water.

== Demographics ==
Historical population
Census	Pop.	Note	%±
1970	192		—
1980	203		5.7%
1990	201		−1.0%
2000	248		23.4%
2010	297		19.8%
2020	286		−3.7%
U.S. Decennial Census; 2013 Estimate

As of the census of 2010, there were 297 people, 101 households, and 75 families residing in the town. The population density was 221.0 inhabitants per square mile (85.3/km^{2}). There were 118 housing units at an average density of 105.2 per square mile (40.6/km^{2}). The racial makeup of the town was 99.60% White and 0.40% Black or African American. 0.40% of the population were Hispanic or Latino of any race.

There were 101 households, out of which 31.7% had children under the age of 18 living with them, 66.3% were married couples living together, 6.9% had a female householder with no husband present, and 25.7% were non-families. 22.8% of all households were made up of individuals, and 5.9% had someone living alone who was 65 years of age or older. The average household size was 2.46 and the average family size was 2.89.

In the town, the population was spread out, with 26.6% under the age of 18, 8.5% from 18 to 24, 26.6% from 25 to 44, 21.8% from 45 to 64, and 16.5% who were 65 years of age or older. The median age was 35 years. For every 100 females, there were 98.4 males. For every 100 females age 18 and over, there were 102.2 males.

The median income for a household in the town was $33,750, and the median income for a family was $37,708. Males had a median income of $26,250 versus $16,750 for females. The per capita income for the town was $13,491. About 12.7% of families and 10.4% of the population were below the poverty line, including 15.5% of those under the age of 18 and 15.4% of those 65 or over.

== History ==
Carolina was founded by Elzy Henderson Garvin from Wagener, South Carolina. South Carolina had been hit by an especially severe drought and when missionaries from the Church of Jesus Christ of Latter-day Saints (the Mormons) arrived in the area, many members of the Garvin family converted to the Mormon faith. Elzy Garvin left South Carolina in search of better land, better climate for farming and for matters of faith. It was recorded that he once remarked, "Our family left Ireland to practice our faith, and we are not becoming something new." The area reminded him so much of his home state that he named it "Carolina".

== Education ==
It is within the Covington County Board of Education school district.
