= George LeMaistre =

American lawyer, banker and professor

George A. LeMaistre (September 8, 1911 – September 26, 1994), was a lawyer, banker, professor, and chairman of the Federal Deposit Insurance Corporation. A white Alabamian, he publicly challenged Governor-elect George C. Wallace in November 1962 on the issue of segregation.

== Background ==
He was born in Lockhart, Alabama, a Gulf Coast company town created seven years before his birth by the Jackson Lumber Company, which operated a mill there that was involved in a peonage scandal. His father, John Wesley LeMaistre, was a surveyor for the lumber company, his mother, Edith (McLeod) LeMaistre, was a former school teacher. Through investments, company stock, and John Wesley LeMaistre's rising to directorship of the First National Bank, the family had become wealthy by the time of the father's death in 1929.

== Education ==
George LeMaistre graduated from the University of Alabama School of Law in 1933.

== Career ==
In 1939, he began teaching law at the school, which he would continue until his death. He left his law practice in 1960 to become chairman and president of the City National Bank of Tuscaloosa. In 1970, he became president of the Alabama Bankers Association and vice chairman of the government relations council of the American Bankers Association.

== Politics ==
As an active Democrat, he supported the presidential candidacies of John F. Kennedy in 1960 and Robert F. Kennedy in 1968. President Richard M. Nixon, a Republican, appointed LeMaistre to the governing board of the Federal Deposit Insurance Corporation. He was elected chairman of the F.D.I.C. in June 1977, resigning in August 1978.

== Civil Rights ==
Historian Dan T. Carter has characterized LeMaistre as among the "real heroes among white businessmen" who in the early 1960s urged a defiant Alabama to accept integration and the rule of law.

In the wake of the Brown v. Board of Education decision that separate public facilities were inherently unequal and, thus, unconstitutional, LeMaistre had privately argued to fellow businessmen that the decline of Arkansas that followed resistance to the integration of Little Rock schools proved that Alabama should abandon segregation. But the 1962 riot at the University of Mississippi in Oxford, Mississippi, coupled with Gov. Wallace's pledge to stand in the schoolhouse door to stop integration convinced LeMaistre to confront the issue publicly.

Although known to be a colorless and dry public speaker, "he spoke with passion and conviction" in November 1962 before the Tuscaloosa Civitan Club to pronounce the time had come for white Alabamians to take a moral stand. Integration was not only an economic issue, he said, but a legal and moral issue. Said LeMaistre: "For too long now, rabble-rousing hate groups and loud-mouthed politicians have undertaken to state the Southern viewpoint on matters which affect our lives." Like it or not, the law professor said, the Supreme Court was the "final interpreter of the Constitution" and no state official "has the right to put himself above the law." Pausing for effect and letting his eyes pass around the room, LeMaistre added, "And that includes a governor or a governor-elect."

"There was an audible gasp of shock," wrote historian Carter, "and then an astonishing response: almost everyone in the crowded room stood and applauded."

Subsequently, LeMaistre was part of a delegation of four who met with the newly inaugurated Wallace in the governor's office. LeMaistre made the argument for the rule of law as defined by the Supreme Court, which Wallace dismissed as little more than the opinion of nine men, adding heatedly that he considered "law and order" to be a "communist term" used in the service of oppression. At this, LeMaistre "lost it," leaning within inches into the very face of Southern defiance, he screamed, "George, that's bullshit! That's bullshit!"

== Death ==
He died in Birmingham, Alabama, of complications after heart surgery.
