= Brooks, Alabama =

Unincorporated community in Alabama, United States

- Unincorporated community
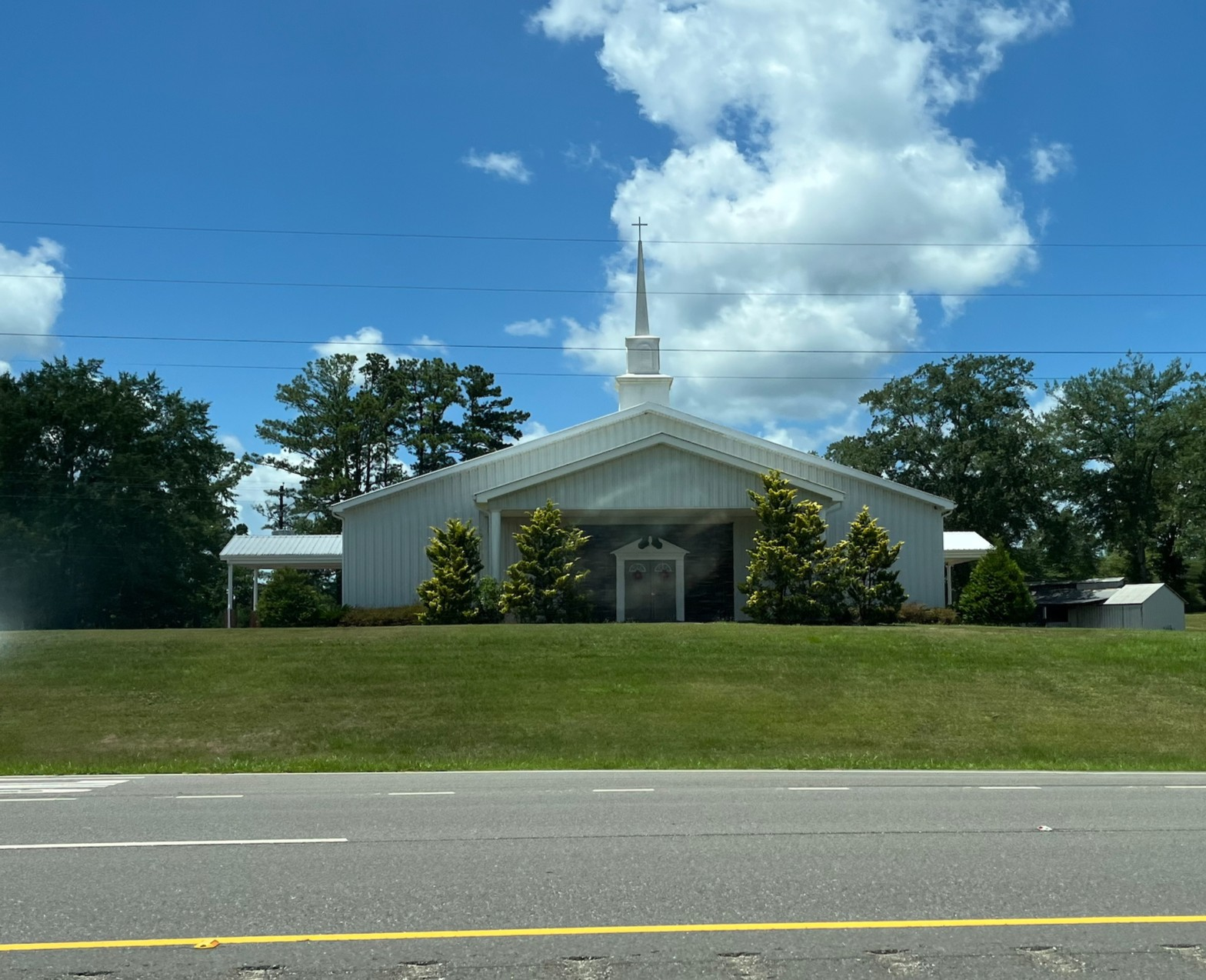
- Brooks Assembly of God

- Location within Alabama Location within the United States
- Coordinates: 31°28′55″N 86°41′06″W
- Country: United States
- State: Alabama
- County: Covington
- Elevation: 341 ft (104 m)
- Time zone: UTC-6 (Central (CST))
  - Summer (DST): UTC-5 (CDT)
- Area code: 334
- GNIS feature ID: 114960

Brooks is an unincorporated community in Covington County, Alabama, United States.

== History ==
The community was likely named for the Brooks family, who lived in the area. A post office operated under the name Brooks from 1900 to 1915.
