= Fairfield, Covington County, Alabama =

Unincorporated community in Alabama, United States

Fairfield, Alabama
- Unincorporated community
- Location within Alabama Location within the United States
- Coordinates: 31°15′07″N 86°38′44″W
- Country: United States
- State: Alabama
- County: Covington
- Elevation: 190 ft (58 m)
- Time zone: UTC-6 (Central (CST))
  - Summer (DST): UTC-5 (CDT)
- Area code: 334
- GNIS feature ID: 118112

Fairfield is an unincorporated community in Covington County, Alabama, United States.

== History ==
The community was likely named as a geographic descriptor. A post office operated under the name Fairfield from 1872 to 1903.
