= Lockhart, Alabama =

- Town
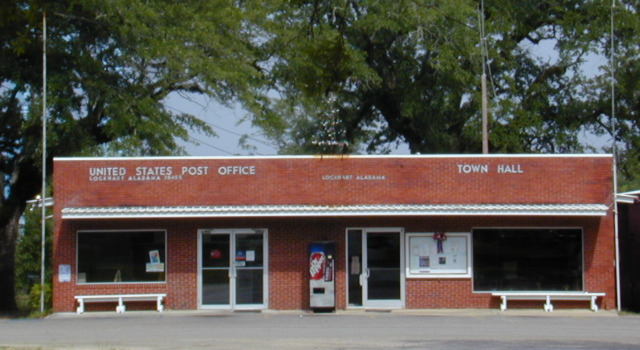
- The Lockhart post office and town hall share a building at the east end of oak-canopied Seminole Street.

- Location of Lockhart in Covington County, Alabama.
- Coordinates: 31°00′46″N 86°21′02″W
- Country: United States
- State: Alabama
- County: Covington

Area
  - Total: 1.13 sq mi (2.92 km^{2})
  - Land: 1.09 sq mi (2.82 km^{2})
  - Water: 0.039 sq mi (0.10 km^{2})
- Elevation: 308 ft (94 m)

Population (2020)
  - Total: 445
  - Density: 409/sq mi (157.9/km^{2})
- Time zone: UTC−6 (Central (CST))
  - Summer (DST): UTC−5 (CDT)
- ZIP code: 36455
- Area code: 334
- FIPS code: 01-43816
- GNIS feature ID: 2406033

Lockhart is a town in Covington County, Alabama, United States. At the 2020 census, the population was 445.

== Geography ==
Lockhart is located in southern Covington County 1 mile (2 km) north of the Florida state line. Lockhart is bordered by the town of Florala to the east.

According to the U.S. Census Bureau, the town has a total area of 1.1 square miles (2.9 km^{2}), of which 1.1 square miles (2.8 km^{2}) is land and 0.04 square miles (0.1 km^{2}), or 3.53%, is water.

== History ==
Lockhart came into being about 1904 when the Jackson Lumber Company mill was constructed there, the community being a company town. Many streets were named for Native American tribes. The mill was erected to handle the dense forests of yellow pine in what was known as the "Jackson Tract". The town was named for Standard Oil magnate and Pittsburgh, Pennsylvania financier, Charles Lockhart. In 1912, the mill employed around 1,000 workers and ran 24/7. At that time Lockhart was the largest lumber mill in the United States. Flooring for the famous Waldorf-Astoria Hotel in New York City came from Lockhart.

In 1903 the mill was the center of a peonage scandal. More than 100 immigrant laborers recruited in cities in the North were held against their will in a walled compound on the site. Company officials were sentenced to as much as 18 months in jail when convicted but were able to have their sentences reduced by political friends.

The milling facility was served by both the Central of Georgia Railroad and the Louisville and Nashville Railroad, connecting through nearby Florala, Alabama. "The mill, however, closed in 1940, and historical accounts offer two reasons. Military enlistments prior to U.S. entry in World War II caused a labor shortage, or company officials sold their holdings and the land to the residents after cutting all the timber in the area and deciding not to wait for replanted timber to mature. Jackson Lumber Company also donated much land to the state that was replanted and developed by the Civilian Conservation Corps into Geneva State Forest in neighboring Geneva County." This land had little value after it had been clear cut, the practice of the time, and being unable to sell the now-deforested acreage during the Great Depression, the company returned it to the state in the 1930s rather than pay taxes on it.

== Demographics ==
Historical population
Census	Pop.	Note	%±
1940	910		—
1950	819		−10.0%
1960	799		−2.4%
1970	698		−12.6%
1980	547		−21.6%
1990	484		−11.5%
2000	548		13.2%
2010	516		−5.8%
2020	445		−13.8%
U.S. Decennial Census; 2013 Estimate

As of the census of 2000, there were 548 people, 229 households, and 147 families residing in the town. The population density was 504.1 inhabitants per square mile (194.6/km^{2}). There were 264 housing units at an average density of 242.9 per square mile (93.8/km^{2}). The racial makeup of the town was 74.82% White, 23.91% Black or African American, 0.36% Native American, 0.36% Pacific Islander, and 0.55% from two or more races. 2.19% of the population were Hispanic or Latino of any race.

There were 229 households, out of which 30.6% had children under the age of 18 living with them, 48.5% were married couples living together, 11.8% had a female householder with no husband present, and 35.4% were non-families. 33.2% of all households were made up of individuals, and 15.7% had someone living alone who was 65 years of age or older. The average household size was 2.39 and the average family size was 3.01.

In the town, the population was 25.4% under the age of 18, 8.0% from 18 to 24, 24.8% from 25 to 44, 25.4% from 45 to 64, and 16.4% who were 65 years of age or older. The median age was 39 years. For every 100 females, there were 92.3 males. For every 100 females age 18 and over, there were 85.1 males. The median income for a household in the town was $23,281, and the median income for a family was $29,688. Males had a median income of $20,625 versus $18,750 for females. The per capita income for the town was $14,338. About 17.5% of families and 25.5% of the population were below the poverty line, including 32.4% of those under age 18 and 22.5% of those age 65 or over.

== Education ==
The city is within the Covington County Board of Education school district.

Schools in the city include:

- WS Harlan Elementary School (1903)

== Notable people ==
- Charles LeMaistre, physician and educator
- George LeMaistre, lawyer, banker and chairman of the Federal Deposit Insurance Corporation.
- William March, author of The Bad Seed and World War I novel Company K.
- Art White, former offensive lineman in the National Football League
