= Huckaville, Alabama =

Unincorporated community in Alabama, United States

- Unincorporated community
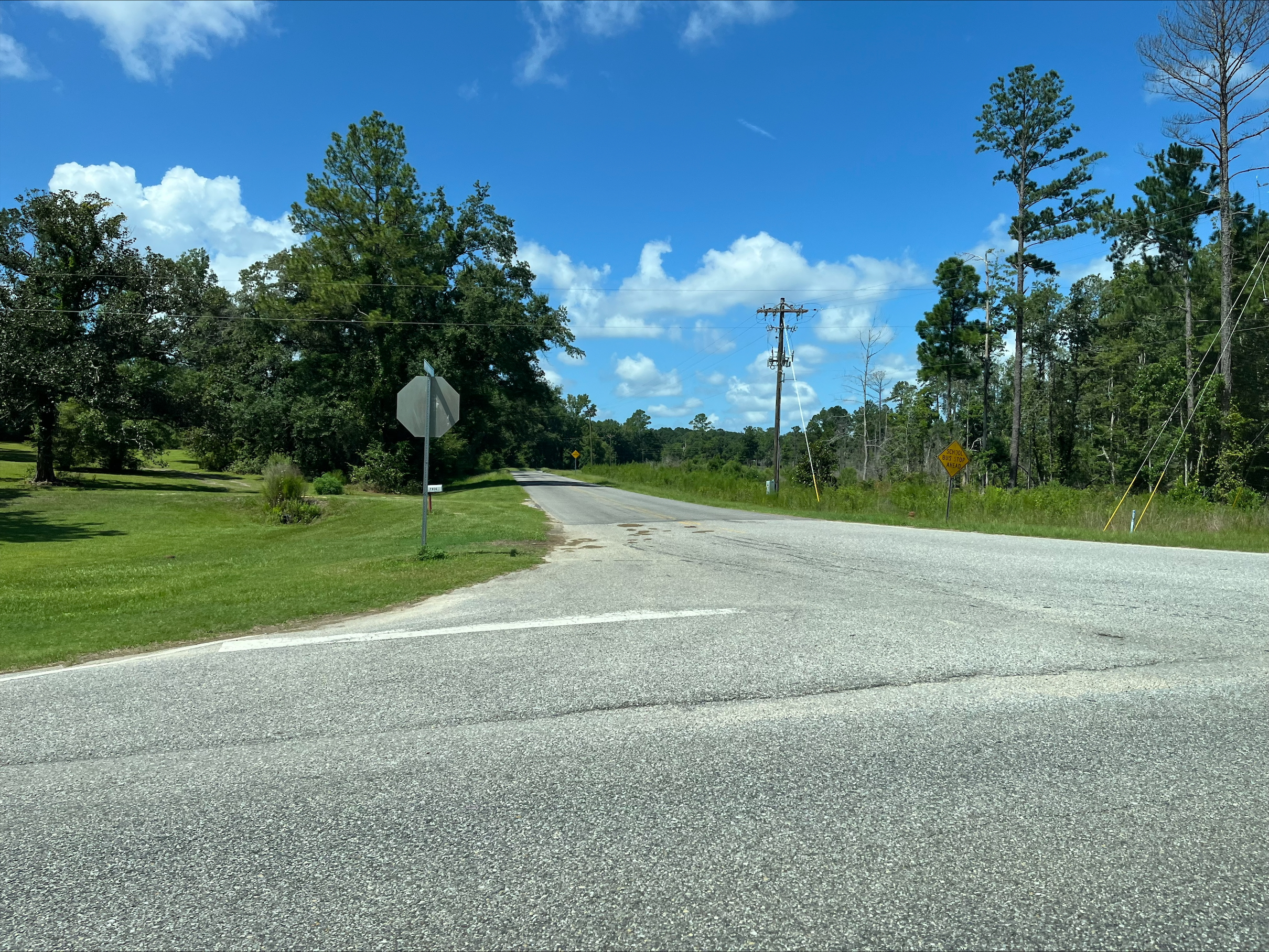
- Huckaville along Alabama State Route 55

- Location within Alabama Location within the United States
- Coordinates: 31°04′47″N 86°24′58″W
- Country: United States
- State: Alabama
- County: Covington
- Elevation: 184 ft (56 m)
- Time zone: UTC-6 (Central (CST))
  - Summer (DST): UTC-5 (CDT)
- Area code: 334
- GNIS feature ID: 156505

Huckaville, also known as Liberty Hill, is an unincorporated community in Covington County, Alabama, United States. Huckaville is located on Alabama State Route 55, 7.1 miles (11.4 km) northwest of Florala.

== History ==
A post office operated under the name Liberty Hill from 1892 to 1907.
