= Beck, Alabama =

Unincorporated community in Alabama, United States

- Unincorporated community
- Location within Alabama Location within the United States
- Coordinates: 31°15′23″N 86°35′05″W
- Country: United States
- State: Alabama
- County: Covington
- Elevation: 151 ft (46 m)
- Time zone: UTC-6 (Central (CST))
  - Summer (DST): UTC-5 (CDT)
- Area code: 334
- GNIS feature ID: 113776

Beck is an unincorporated community in Covington County, Alabama, United States.

== History ==
The community was likely named for the Beck family, who lived in the area. A post office operated under the name Beck from 1898 to 1904. Beck was once home to a general store, gristmill, and automotive garage.
