= Green Bay, Alabama =

Unincorporated community in Alabama, United States

- Unincorporated community
- Location within Alabama Location within the United States
- Coordinates: 31°10′41″N 86°17′22″W
- Country: United States
- State: Alabama
- County: Covington
- Elevation: 259 ft (79 m)
- Time zone: UTC-6 (Central (CST))
  - Summer (DST): UTC-5 (CDT)
- Area code: 334
- GNIS feature ID: 159694

Green Bay, also spelled Greenbay, is an unincorporated community in Covington County, Alabama, United States. Green Bay is located on U.S. Route 331, 7.2 miles (11.6 km) south of Opp.

== History ==
The community was likely named for the bay trees which grow in the area. A post office operated under the name Green Bay from 1879 to 1933.
