= Antioch, Covington County, Alabama =

Unincorporated community in Alabama, United States

Antioch, Alabama
- Unincorporated community
- Location within Alabama Location within the United States
- Coordinates: 31°23′09″N 86°22′59″W
- Country: United States
- State: Alabama
- County: Covington
- Elevation: 394 ft (120 m)
- Time zone: UTC-6 (Central (CST))
  - Summer (DST): UTC-5 (CDT)
- Area code: 334
- GNIS feature ID: 113099

Antioch, also known as Hilton, is an unincorporated community in Covington County, Alabama, United States.

== History ==
The community was originally called Hilton, then the name was changed to Antioch. The community was likely named after the local Antioch Church, which was in turn named for the ancient city. A post office operated under the name Hilton from 1882 to 1904.

== Demographics ==
According to the returns from 1850-2010 for Alabama, it has never reported a population figure separately on the U.S. Census.
