= Eugene Crum Foshee =

American politician

Eugene Crum Foshee, Sr. (December 13, 1937 – March 18, 2017) was an American politician.

Born in Red Level, Alabama, Foshee owned a cotton and peanut farm in Red Level. He served in the Alabama House of Representatives from 1966 to 1970 and was a Democrat. Foshee then served in the Alabama Senate and retired in 1994. After he retired, Foshee was a consultant in government relations.
