= Red Level, Alabama =

- Town
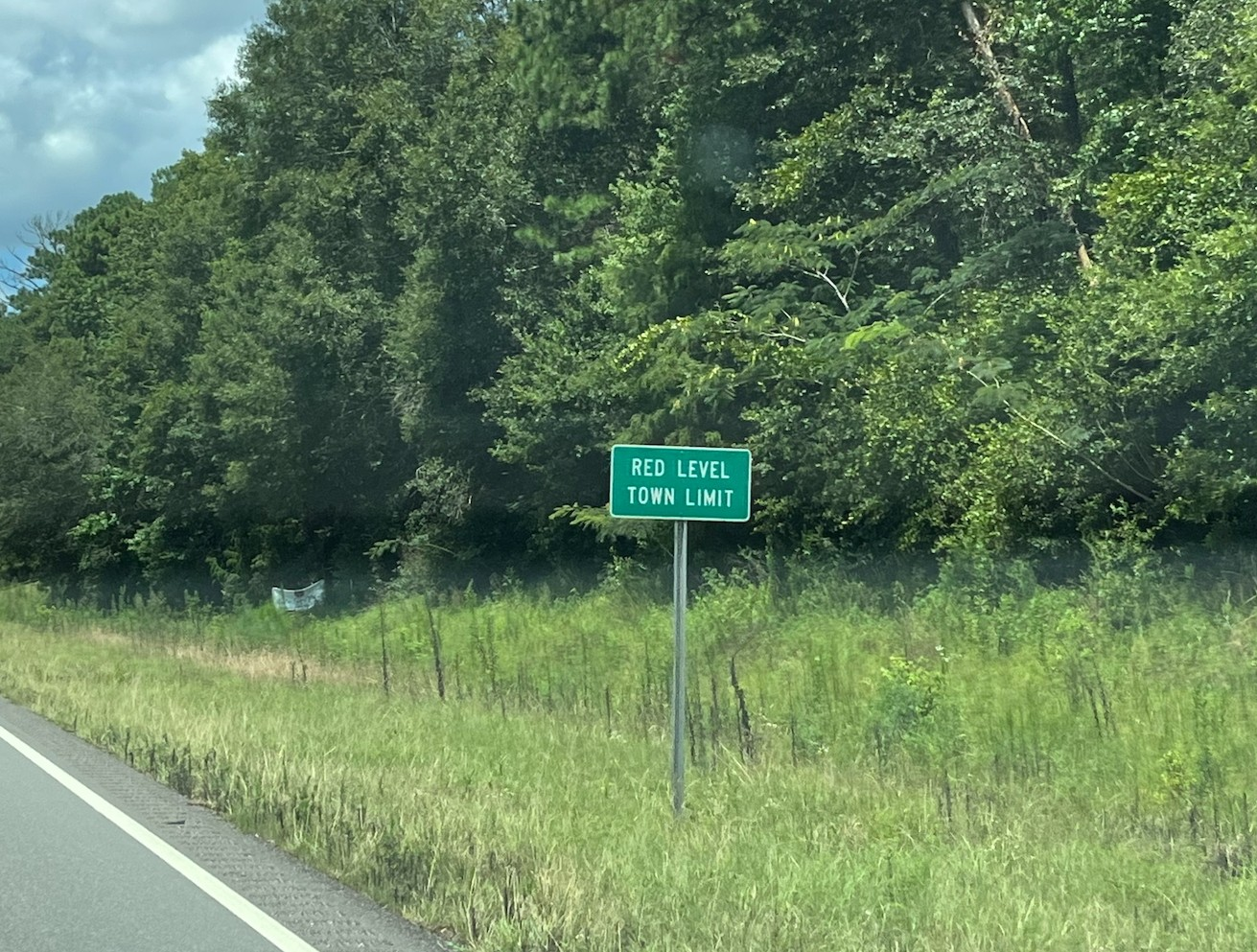
- Red Level Town Limit sign

- Location of Red Level in Covington County, Alabama.
- Coordinates: 31°24′20″N 86°36′30″W
- Country: United States
- State: Alabama
- County: Covington

Area
  - Total: 1.93 sq mi (4.99 km^{2})
  - Land: 1.92 sq mi (4.98 km^{2})
  - Water: 0.0039 sq mi (0.01 km^{2})
- Elevation: 361 ft (110 m)

Population (2020)
  - Total: 432
  - Density: 224.8/sq mi (86.79/km^{2})
- Time zone: UTC-6 (Central (CST))
  - Summer (DST): UTC-5 (CDT)
- ZIP code: 36474
- Area code: 334
- FIPS code: 01-63768
- GNIS feature ID: 2407185

Red Level is a town in Covington County, Alabama, United States. At the 2020 census, the population was 432.

== Geography ==
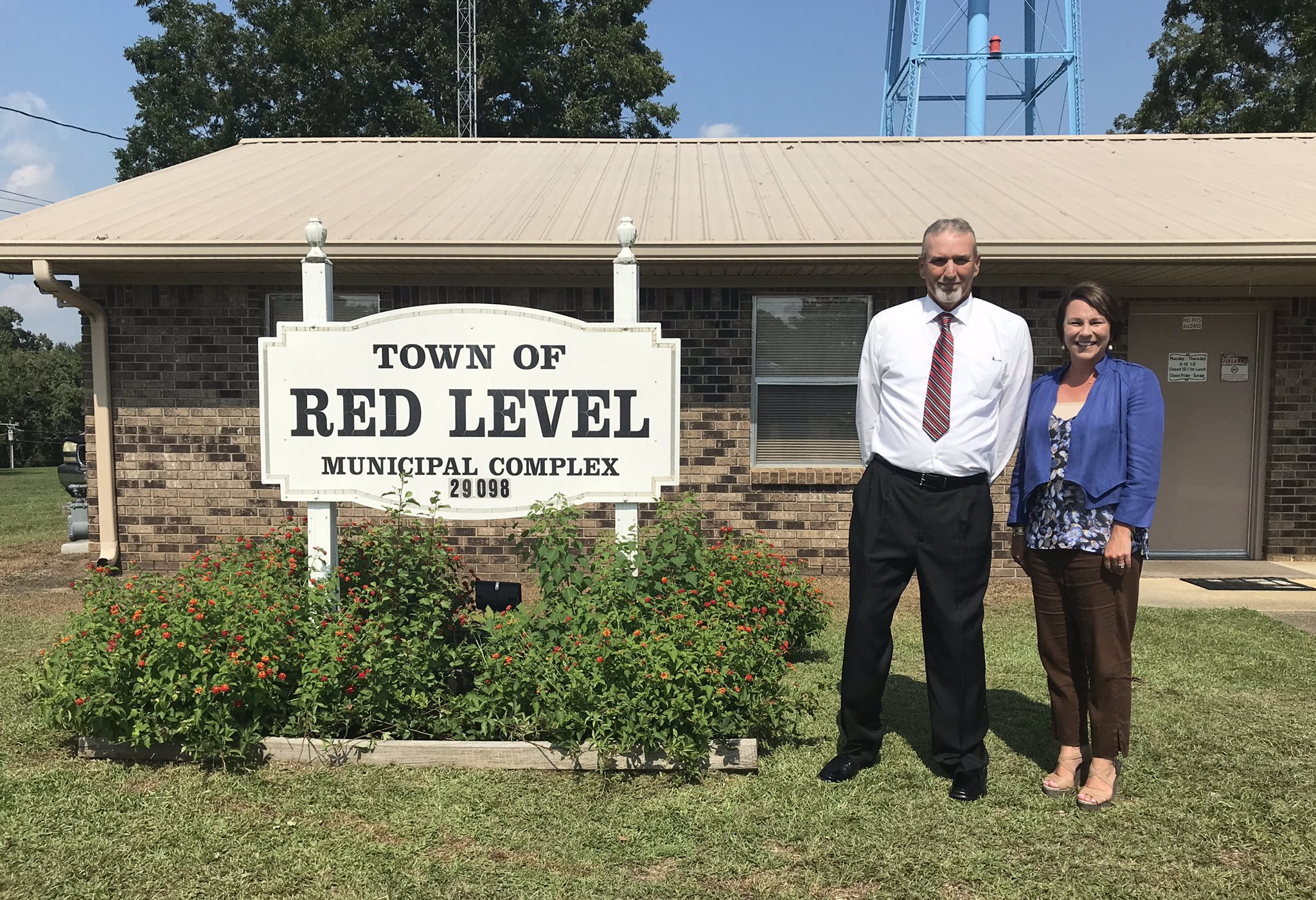
Red Level's Mayor Willie Hendrix with US Representative Martha Roby in 2019

Red Level is located in northwest Covington County. According to the U.S. Census Bureau, the town has a total area of 1.9 square miles (5.0 km^{2}), of which 0.004 square miles (0.01 km^{2}), or 0.26%, is water.

== Demographics ==
Historical population
Census	Pop.	Note	%±
1910	317		—
1920	385		21.5%
1930	445		15.6%
1940	516		16.0%
1950	656		27.1%
1960	617		−5.9%
1970	616		−0.2%
1980	504		−18.2%
1990	588		16.7%
2000	556		−5.4%
2010	487		−12.4%
2020	432		−11.3%
U.S. Decennial Census; 2013 Estimate

Red Level first appeared on the 1910 U.S. Census, having incorporated as a town in 1901. In 1960, it was erroneously reported as having 327 residents. This was due to an error which placed almost half of the residents outside the town limits, it was afterwards adjusted to 617 residents. Red Level derives its name from a store that once existed in the area named Read’s Level and predates the town by a few years. James Read, the owner of the store, always pronounced his name with a silent “a,” which prompted a misspelling of the name.

=== 2000 census ===
As of the census of 2000, there were 556 people, 213 households, and 151 families residing in the town. The population density was 296.1 inhabitants per square mile (114.3/km^{2}). There were 248 housing units at an average density of 132.1 per square mile (51.0/km^{2}). The racial makeup of the town was 88.67% White, 10.07% Black or African American, 0.18% Native American, 0.54% from other races, and 0.54% from two or more races.

There were 213 households, out of which 33.8% had children under the age of 18 living with them, 54.5% were married couples living together, 11.7% had a female householder with no husband present, and 29.1% were non-families. 28.2% of all households were made up of individuals, and 15.5% had someone living alone who was 65 years of age or older. The average household size was 2.55 and the average family size was 3.09.

In the town, the population was spread out, with 26.4% under the age of 18, 7.9% from 18 to 24, 26.3% from 25 to 44, 22.3% from 45 to 64, and 17.1% who were 65 years of age or older. The median age was 36 years. For every 100 females, there were 102.9 males. For every 100 females age 18 and over, there were 101.5 males.

The median income for a household in the town was $25,956, and the median income for a family was $36,250. Males had a median income of $25,833 versus $18,750 for females. The per capita income for the town was $14,491. About 11.0% of families and 16.5% of the population were below the poverty line, including 22.3% of those under age 18 and 20.0% of those age 65 or over.

=== 2020 census ===
Red Level racial composition
Race	Num.	Perc.
White (non-Hispanic)	382	88.43%
Black or African American (non-Hispanic)	27	6.25%
Native American	1	0.23%
Asian	1	0.23%
Other/Mixed	19	4.4%
Hispanic or Latino	2	0.46%

As of the 2020 United States census, there were 432 people, 159 households, and 107 families residing in the town.

== Education ==
It is within the Covington County Board of Education school district.

There is a PK-12 school in the community, Red Level School.

== Notable people ==
- Eugene Crum Foshee, Alabama state legislator, was born in Red Level.
- Q. V. Lowe, head baseball coach for Auburn University at Montgomery
- Luther Terry, Surgeon General of the United States
- Willie Tyler, ventriloquist and entertainer, born in Red Level
