= W.S. Harlan Elementary School =

School in Lockhart, Alabama

Coordinates: 31.0160129°N 86.3574473°W

WS Harlan Elementary School

Location
- P.O. Box 267; Lockhart, AL 36455; USA

Information
- School district: Covington County Schools
- Principal: Joy Colvin
- Enrollment: 301 as of 2017, AdvancED Executive Summary of Covington County Board of Education
- Information: 334-858-3294
- Website: School website

W.S. Harlan Elementary School is a historic American elementary school in Lockhart, Alabama, operated by Covington County Schools. It was honored by the Blue Ribbon Schools Program in 2009.

First known as Lockhart School and established for the mill town's children, the school started in 1903 in a three-room frame building with Mrs. Christine McLeod as the first teacher and an enrollment of 75 students. The building was also used for Sunday school classes.

That building was used until 1924 when a more modern school (the current grammar school building) was constructed of materials from Jackson Lumber Company and named W.S. Harlan Consolidated School in honor of the lumber mill's manager, William Stewart Harlan, who had secured its construction before his death in 1923. The junior high building was also built of Jackson Lumber Company materials and constructed in 1939 as part of the Federal Works Agency's Public Works Administration.

The grammar school building is the oldest schoolhouse in Covington County, Alabama, still functioning as an active school.

The school has served various grade levels through the years, from pre-K to eighth grade, but is currently an elementary school for students pre-K to sixth grade. The designations of the two buildings as "grammar school" and "junior high school" are in recognition of the days in which the school served students K-8. No matter the age of the students, W.S. Harlan School has educated the children of the Lockhart area since it was part of the mill-town community of 1903.

An Alabama Historical Association marker was unveiled at the school on December 11, 2017. On the same occasion the school's auditorium was designated the Joann Welch Geohagan Auditorium in honor of her 48 years of teaching at WSH.

In 2018 the Alabama Bicentennial Commission and Governor Kay Ivey recognized the school as a participating bicentennial school, and WSH became an Alabama Bicentennial PastPort site for Covington County.
