= Andalusia City Schools =

School district in Alabama, United States

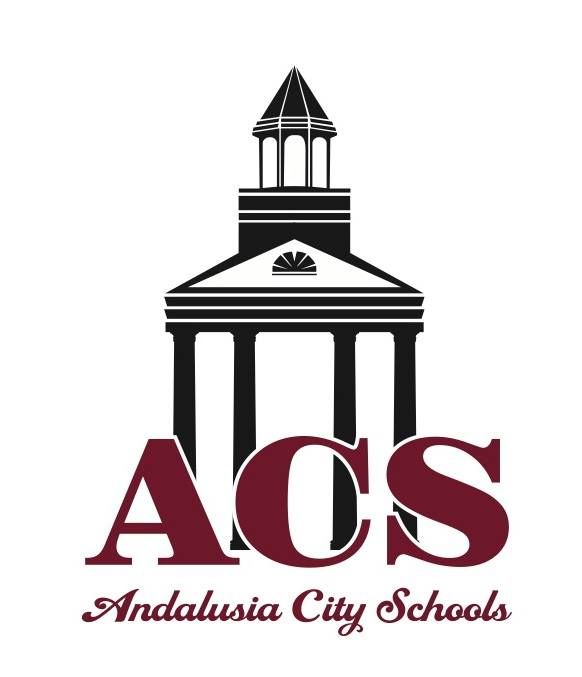

Address
- 1201 C. C. Baker Avenue Andalusia, Covington County, AL, 36421; United States

District information
- Type: Public
- Grades: PK-12
- President: Mrs. Amy Dugger
- Vice-president: Mr. Sammy Glover
- Superintendent: Dr. Daniel Shakespeare
- Schools: 3
- NCES District ID: 0100060

Students and staff
- Students: 1,785 ^{('20-'21)}
- Teachers: 100.56 ^{('20-'21)}
- Staff: 66.16 ^{('20-'21)}
- Student–teacher ratio: 17.75 ^{('20-'21)}

Other information
- Website: Official website

The Andalusia City School District or Andalusia City Schools is the school district of Andalusia, Alabama.

The district boundary is that of the city limits. Andalusia City School District serves 1,785 students and employs 101 teachers and 66 staff as of the 2020-2021 school year. The district includes one elementary school, one middle school, and one high school.

== Schools ==
The Andalusia City School District consists of three schools:

- Andalusia Elementary School (PK-6)
- Andalusia Junior High School (7-8)
- Andalusia High School (9-12)

== School Board ==
Name	Position
Mrs. Amy Dugger	President
Mr. Sammy Glover	Vice President
Mr. David Bryant	Member
Dr. David McCalman	Member
Dr. Parrish King	Member

== See also ==
Other districts in the county:

- Opp City School District
- Covington County Board of Education
