= Straughn (surname) =

Straughn is a Scottish surname. Notable people with the surname include:

- Amber Straughn (born c. 1979), American astrophysicist
- Andy Straughn (born 1959), British boxer
- Seibert Straughn (born 1967), Barbadian sprinter
- Wally Straughn (born 1957), American politician
- Yolande Straughn (born 1968), Barbadian sprinter

== See also ==
- Clifford Straughn Husbands (1926–2017), Barbadian judge and Governor-General
