= Loango, Alabama =

Unincorporated community in Alabama, United States

- Unincorporated community
- Location within Alabama Location within the United States
- Coordinates: 31°19′47″N 86°38′56″W
- Country: United States
- State: Alabama
- County: Covington
- Elevation: 315 ft (96 m)
- Time zone: UTC-6 (Central (CST))
  - Summer (DST): UTC-5 (CDT)
- Area code: 334
- GNIS feature ID: 121936

Loango is an unincorporated community in Covington County, Alabama, United States.

== History ==
A post office operated under the name Loango between 1856 and 1907. The maternal great-great-grandparents of Bill Clinton are buried in the Old Loango Cemetery.

== Name ==
The local explanation for the town name, is that it comes from a combination of the words load, and, and go. A more probable source is the Loango Coast and the port of Loango, Republic of Congo, a major source of slaves before the outlawing of the trans-Atlantic slave trade. (See: Louisiana State Penitentiary, also known as Angola.)
