= Lew Childre =

American author, musician, and CEO (b. 1945)

Doc Lew Childre
- Born: September 7, 1945 (age 80); Goldsboro, North Carolina, U.S.
- Scientific career
- Fields: Human development, psychology, psychotherapy, Stress Management

Doc Lew Childre Jr. (born September 7, 1945) (pronounced "Chill-dree") is an American author and the founder of the HeartMath Institute, a non-profit organization whose objective is to help the development of "heart-brain-coherence". He works on child development and strategies for dealing with stress.

== Biography ==
Doc Lew Childre Jr. is the son of Doc Lew Childre Sr., the Grand Ole Opry star best known for his song "Let's Go Fishing". The prefix "Doc" was inherited from his father. His mother is Eleanor B. Fields. Childre was born and grew up in Goldsboro, North Carolina, United States, attending St. Mary's Catholic School and New Hope High School. He left school in the 11th grade.

After serving in the National Guard, Childre started a recording studio in Boulder Creek, California. In his early twenties, he developed some health problems that caused him to look for alternative treatments and that is when he began researching stress. In 1991, he set up the Institute of HeartMath (now called HeartMath Institute) as a nonprofit research and education organization. The institute conducted experiments in how the right sounds can, according to HeartMath, help align a person's heart and mind energies; for example by monitoring EKG and blood pressure of subjects listening to various sounds, it would be possible to tailor sounds to invoke a specific response.

The CD, called Heart Zones, was released in July and has been climbing the Billboard charts since. It has gone from 23 to 21 this week on the Adult Alternative Chart (i.e. New Age), an indication of heavy sales. It is believed to be the first "therapeutic" tape ever to make the charts.

— Mary Evertz, The Tampa Bay Times (September 1992)

In 1992, he released his first commercial music recording called "Heart Zones". It was made with synthesizer and digital drum machine and was said to sound like "Andreas Vollenweider meets Pink Floyd meets Kenny G meets the Moody Blues". There are four short songs, each played twice, for a total of 34 minutes of music. Childre claimed it would help reduce stress and enhance intuition and creativity. The music was played in alternative radio stations in 35 of the nation's largest 100 markets, and remained on the Billboard charts for over a year. It was the first music for stress reduction ever to make the list.

In 1993, Redford Williams, director of the Behavior Medicine Research Center at Duke University, was skeptical of Childre's claims saying Childre had "no basis for drawing any of these conclusions" about stress reduction, saying "there's only one standard to judge, and that's by the presentation to the medical community of findings in research that pass a muster called peer review." Childre's claim that his music could invoke a specific response was met with skepticism by Diana Deutsch, a psychology professor at the University of California, San Diego and editor of the journal Music Perception, which publishes articles on research dealing with music psychology. Deutsch said, "If he [Childre] has got it, it's going to be an all-time first."

== Bibliography ==
- Doc Childre, Howard Martin and Donna Beech: The HeartMath Solution: The Institute of HeartMath's Revolutionary Program for Engaging the Power of the Heart's Intelligence. HarperOne, New York 2000, ISBN 9780062516060.
- Doc Childre and Deborah Rozman: Transforming Stress: The HeartMath Solution for Relieving Worry, Fatigue, and Tension. New Harbinger Publications, Oakland / California 2005, ISBN 978-1572243972.
