= Straughn, Alabama =

Unincorporated community in Alabama, United States

- Unincorporated community
- Location within Alabama Location within the United States
- Coordinates: 31°23′18″N 86°25′05″W
- Country: United States
- State: Alabama
- County: Covington
- Elevation: 374 ft (114 m)
- Time zone: UTC-6 (Central (CST))
  - Summer (DST): UTC-5 (CDT)
- Area code: 334
- GNIS feature ID: 127456

Straughn, also known as Haygood, is an unincorporated community in Covington County, Alabama, United States.

== History ==
The community was originally called Haygood, but the name was later changed to Straughn in honor of a local family who was instrumental in establishing the community's school. A post office operated under the name Haygood from 1892 to 1904.

== Education ==
It is in the Covington County Board of Education school district.

Straughn is home to Straughn Elementary School, Straughn Middle School, and Straughn High School.
