= Opine, Covington County, Alabama =

Unincorporated community in Alabama, United States

Opine, Alabama
- Unincorporated community
- Location within Alabama Location within the United States
- Coordinates: 31°19′40″N 86°17′14″W
- Country: United States
- State: Alabama
- County: Covington
- Elevation: 338 ft (103 m)
- Time zone: UTC-6 (Central (CST))
  - Summer (DST): UTC-5 (CDT)
- Area code: 334
- GNIS feature ID: 156840

Opine, also spelled O'Pine, is an unincorporated community in Covington County, Alabama, United States.

== History ==
A post office operated under the name Opine from 1880 to 1891.
