= Opp City School District =

School district in Alabama, United States

Address
- 305 East Stewart Avenue Opp, Alabama, 36467; United States

District information
- Type: Public
- Grades: PreK–12
- NCES District ID: 0102610

Students and staff
- Students: 1,275
- Teachers: 85.8
- Staff: 61.75
- Student–teacher ratio: 14.86

Other information
- Website: www.oppcityschools.com

Opp City School District is a school district in Covington County, Alabama.

The district includes the city limits of Opp.

== See also ==
Other districts in the county:

- Covington County Board of Education
- Andalusia City Schools
