= Covington County, Alabama =

County in Alabama, United States

- County
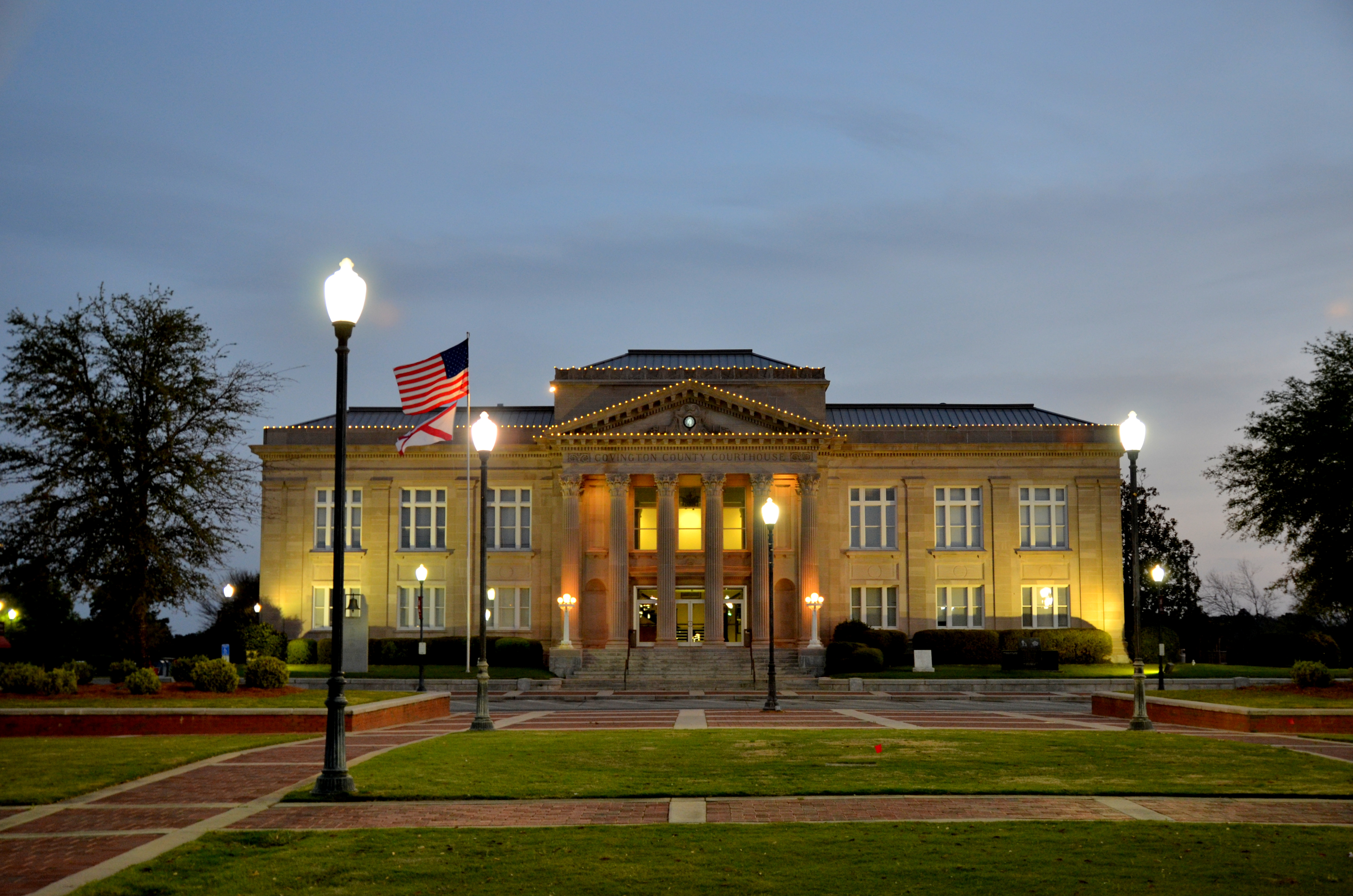
- The Covington County Courthouse in Andalusia

- Seal

- Location within the U.S. state of Alabama
- Coordinates: 31°14′31″N 86°27′09″W
- Country: United States
- State: Alabama
- Founded: December 17, 1821
- Named for: Leonard Covington
- Seat: Andalusia
- Largest city: Andalusia

Area
  - Total: 1,044 sq mi (2,700 km^{2})
  - Land: 1,030 sq mi (2,700 km^{2})
  - Water: 13 sq mi (34 km^{2}) 1.3%

Population (2020)
  - Total: 37,570
  - Estimate (2025): 37,947 ▲
  - Density: 36.5/sq mi (14.1/km^{2})
- Time zone: UTC−6 (Central)
  - Summer (DST): UTC−5 (CDT)
- Congressional district: 1st
- Website: www.covingtoncountyal.gov
- County Number 23 on Alabama Licence Plates

Covington County (briefly Jones County) is a county located in the south central portion of the U.S. state of Alabama. As of the 2020 census, the population was 37,570. Its county seat is Andalusia. Its name is in honor of Brigadier General Leonard Covington of Maryland and Mississippi, who died in the War of 1812.

== History ==
Covington County was established on December 17, 1821. The Alabama state legislature changed the name to Jones County on August 6, 1868. Two months later on October 10, 1868, the original name was restored.

The county was declared a disaster area in September 1979 due to damage from Hurricane Frederic and again in October 1995 due to Hurricane Opal.

== Geography ==
According to the United States Census Bureau, the county has a total area of 1,044 square miles (2,700 km^{2}), of which 1,030 square miles (2,700 km^{2}) is land and 13 square miles (34 km^{2}) (1.3%) is water. The county is located in the Gulf Coastal Plain region of the state. It is drained by the Conecuh and Yellow rivers.

=== Major highways ===
- U.S. Highway 29 / State Route 15 (unsigned)
- U.S. Highway 84 / State Route 12 (unsigned)
- U.S. Highway 331 / State Route 9 (unsigned)
- State Route 52
- State Route 54
- State Route 55
- State Route 100
- State Route 134
- State Route 137

=== Transit ===
- Covington Area Transit System (CATS) provides demand-response service.

=== Adjacent counties ===
- Butler County (north)
- Crenshaw County (north)
- Coffee County (east)
- Geneva County (east)
- Walton County, Florida (southeast)
- Okaloosa County, Florida (southwest)
- Escambia County (west)
- Conecuh County (west)

=== National protected area ===
- Conecuh National Forest (part)

== Demographics ==
Historical population
Census	Pop.	Note	%±
1830	1,522		—
1840	2,435		60.0%
1850	3,645		49.7%
1860	6,469		77.5%
1870	4,868		−24.7%
1880	5,639		15.8%
1890	7,536		33.6%
1900	15,346		103.6%
1910	32,124		109.3%
1920	38,103		18.6%
1930	41,356		8.5%
1940	42,417		2.6%
1950	40,373		−4.8%
1960	35,631		−11.7%
1970	34,079		−4.4%
1980	36,850		8.1%
1990	36,478		−1.0%
2000	37,631		3.2%
2010	37,765		0.4%
2020	37,570		−0.5%
2025 (est.)	37,947	▲	1.0%
U.S. Decennial Census; 1790–1960 1900–1990; 1990–2000 2010–2020

=== 2020 census ===
As of the 2020 census, the county had a population of 37,570. The median age was 44.2 years. 21.8% of residents were under the age of 18 and 21.8% of residents were 65 years of age or older. For every 100 females there were 93.6 males, and for every 100 females age 18 and over there were 89.8 males age 18 and over.

The racial makeup of the county was 82.2% White, 12.3% Black or African American, 0.4% American Indian and Alaska Native, 0.6% Asian, 0.0% Native Hawaiian and Pacific Islander, 0.7% from some other race, and 3.8% from two or more races. Hispanic or Latino residents of any race comprised 1.7% of the population.

31.2% of residents lived in urban areas, while 68.8% lived in rural areas.

There were 15,515 households in the county, of which 28.3% had children under the age of 18 living with them and 29.6% had a female householder with no spouse or partner present. About 30.7% of all households were made up of individuals and 14.8% had someone living alone who was 65 years of age or older.

There were 18,596 housing units, of which 16.6% were vacant. Among occupied housing units, 72.7% were owner-occupied and 27.3% were renter-occupied. The homeowner vacancy rate was 2.1% and the rental vacancy rate was 11.4%.

=== Racial and ethnic composition ===
Covington County, Alabama –– Racial and ethnic composition Note: the US Census treats Hispanic/Latino as an ethnic category. This table excludes Latinos from the racial categories and assigns them to a separate category. Hispanics/Latinos may be of any race.
Race / Ethnicity (NH = Non-Hispanic)	Pop 2000	Pop 2010	Pop 2020	% 2000	% 2010	% 2020
White alone (NH)	32,247	31,751	30,657	85.69%	84.08%	81.60%
Black or African American alone (NH)	4,618	4,685	4,563	12.27%	12.41%	12.15%
Native American or Alaska Native alone (NH)	180	196	140	0.48%	0.52%	0.37%
Asian alone (NH)	64	148	240	0.17%	0.39%	0.64%
Pacific Islander alone (NH)	3	1	0	0.01%	0.00%	0.00%
Other race alone (NH)	11	13	71	0.03%	0.03%	0.19%
Mixed race or Multiracial (NH)	216	488	1,245	0.57%	1.29%	3.31%
Hispanic or Latino (any race)	292	483	654	0.78%	1.28%	1.74%
Total	37,631	37,765	37,570	100.00%	100.00%	100.00%

=== 2010 census ===
As of the census of 2010, there were 37,765 people, 15,531 households, and 10,791 families living in the county. The population density was 37 people per square mile (14 people/km^{2}). There were 18,829 housing units at an average density of 18 units per square mile (6.9 units/km^{2}). The racial makeup of the county was 84.8% White, 12.5% Black or African American, 0.6% Native American, 0.4% Asian, 0.0% Pacific Islander, 0.4% from other races, and 1.4% from two or more races. 1.3% of the population were Hispanic or Latino of any race.

There were 15,531 households, out of which 26.0% had children under the age of 18 living with them, 50.2% were married couples living together, 13.1% had a female householder with no husband present, and 32.1% were non-families. 28.1% of all households were made up of individuals, and 12.6% had someone living alone who was 65 years of age or older. The average household size was 2.39 and the average family size was 2.91.

The age distribution was 22.6% under the age of 18, 7.8% from 18 to 24, 22.8% from 25 to 44, 28.4% from 45 to 64, and 18.4% who were 65 years of age or older. The median age was 42.4 years. For every 100 females there were 93.9 males. For every 100 females age 18 and over, there were 96.4 males.

The median income for a household in the county was $33,852, and the median income for a family was $43,468. Males had a median income of $32,463 versus $26,241 for females. The per capita income for the county was $19,822. About 15.7% of families and 19.0% of the population were below the poverty line, including 28.3% of those under age 18 and 12.8% of those age 65 or over.

As of 2012 the largest self-reported European ancestry group in Covington County is English with 41.2% of people in Covington County citing that they were of English descent. They were followed by people who wrote that they were of "American" ancestry, who made up 16.0% of Covington county. Irish was the third largest self-reported European ancestry with 14.5% of people in the county writing that they were of Irish descent.

=== 2000 census ===
As of the census of 2000, there were 37,631 people, 15,640 households, and 10,791 families living in the county. The population density was 36 people per square mile (14 people/km^{2}). There were 18,578 housing units at an average density of 18 units per square mile (6.9 units/km^{2}). The racial makeup of the county was 86.2% White, 12.4% Black or African American, 0.5% Native American, 0.2% Asian, <0.1% Pacific Islander, 0.2% from other races, and 0.6% from two or more races. 0.8% of the population were Hispanic or Latino of any race.

There were 15,640 households, out of which 29.5% had children under the age of 18 living with them, 54.1% were married couples living together, 11.3% had a female householder with no husband present, and 31.0% were non-families. 28.6% of all households were made up of individuals, and 14.1% had someone living alone who was 65 years of age or older. The average household size was 2.37 and the average family size was 2.90.

The age distribution was 23.5% under the age of 18, 8.1% from 18 to 24, 26.1% from 25 to 44, 24.3% from 45 to 64, and 17.9% who were 65 years of age or older. The median age was 40 years. For every 100 females there were 91.60 males. For every 100 females age 18 and over, there were 88.00 males.

The median income for a household in the county was $26,336, and the median income for a family was $33,201. Males had a median income of $27,453 versus $19,640 for females. The per capita income for the county was $15,365. About 14.1% of families and 18.4% of the population were below the poverty line, including 23.9% of those under age 18 and 19.2% of those age 65 or over.

== Government ==
Covington County is reliably Republican at the presidential level. The last Democrat to win the county in a presidential election is Jimmy Carter, who won it by a majority in 1976.

United States presidential election results for Covington County, Alabama
Year	Republican		Democratic		Third party(ies)	
Year	No.	%	No.	%	No.	%
1904	310	23.24%	907	67.99%	117	8.77%
1908	315	21.18%	1,054	70.88%	118	7.94%
1912	110	6.47%	1,251	73.54%	340	19.99%
1916	305	14.03%	1,738	79.94%	131	6.03%
1920	548	20.65%	2,039	76.83%	67	2.52%
1924	156	7.54%	1,776	85.88%	136	6.58%
1928	1,681	45.60%	2,000	54.26%	5	0.14%
1932	99	2.49%	3,855	97.15%	14	0.35%
1936	167	3.76%	4,265	95.91%	15	0.34%
1940	186	3.86%	4,635	96.08%	3	0.06%
1944	256	7.92%	2,972	91.98%	3	0.09%
1948	154	5.25%	0	0.00%	2,782	94.75%
1952	1,581	24.11%	4,956	75.57%	21	0.32%
1956	2,257	30.13%	4,887	65.25%	346	4.62%
1960	2,047	26.16%	5,744	73.42%	33	0.42%
1964	7,554	82.33%	0	0.00%	1,621	17.67%
1968	831	6.33%	791	6.03%	11,506	87.64%
1972	9,278	85.27%	1,547	14.22%	56	0.51%
1976	4,977	40.71%	7,081	57.93%	166	1.36%
1980	7,014	51.54%	6,305	46.33%	289	2.12%
1984	9,944	71.63%	3,812	27.46%	127	0.91%
1988	8,130	67.34%	3,845	31.85%	98	0.81%
1992	6,840	48.99%	5,004	35.84%	2,118	15.17%
1996	6,035	50.66%	4,543	38.13%	1,335	11.21%
2000	8,961	65.83%	4,440	32.62%	212	1.56%
2004	11,119	76.02%	3,423	23.40%	85	0.58%
2008	12,444	78.82%	3,240	20.52%	103	0.65%
2012	12,153	78.72%	3,158	20.45%	128	0.83%
2016	13,267	83.23%	2,387	14.97%	286	1.79%
2020	14,586	83.68%	2,721	15.61%	123	0.71%
2024	14,677	85.86%	2,314	13.54%	104	0.61%

United States Senate election results for Covington County, Alabama2
Year	Republican		Democratic		Third party(ies)	
Year	No.	%	No.	%	No.	%
2020	14,120	81.37%	3,214	18.52%	19	0.11%

United States Senate election results for Covington County, Alabama3
Year	Republican		Democratic		Third party(ies)	
Year	No.	%	No.	%	No.	%
2022	9,852	87.40%	1,289	11.44%	131	1.16%

Alabama Gubernatorial election results for Covington County
Year	Republican		Democratic		Third party(ies)	
Year	No.	%	No.	%	No.	%
2022	9,735	86.35%	1,193	10.58%	346	3.07%

== Communities ==
=== Cities ===
- Andalusia (county seat)
- Opp

=== Towns ===
- Babbie
- Carolina
- Florala
- Gantt
- Heath
- Horn Hill
- Libertyville
- Lockhart
- Onycha
- Red Level
- River Falls
- Sanford

=== Unincorporated communities ===
- Antioch
- Beck
- Beda
- Brooks
- Chapel Hill
- Estothel
- Fairfield
- Falco
- Green Bay
- Huckaville
- Loango
- McRae
- Opine
- Rome
- Rose Hill
- South
- Straughn
- Wiggins
- Wing

== Education ==
Three school districts cover sections of the county:

- Covington County Board of Education (all areas except those in the city limits of Andalusia and Opp)
- Andalusia City Schools
- Opp City School District

== See also ==
- National Register of Historic Places listings in Covington County, Alabama
- Properties on the Alabama Register of Landmarks and Heritage in Covington County, Alabama
- Covington County Website
