= Opp, Alabama =

City in Alabama, United States

Opp
- City
- Flag Seal

- Location of Opp in Covington County, Alabama.
- Coordinates: 31°16′50″N 86°15′17″W
- Country: United States
- State: Alabama
- County: Covington
- Established: 1880

Government
  - Mayor: Chance McCurley

Area
  - Total: 24.59 sq mi (63.69 km^{2})
  - Land: 23.66 sq mi (61.29 km^{2})
  - Water: 0.92 sq mi (2.39 km^{2})
- Elevation: 299 ft (91 m)

Population (2020)
  - Total: 6,771
  - Density: 286.1/sq mi (110.47/km^{2})
- Time zone: UTC-6 (Central (CST))
  - Summer (DST): UTC-5 (CDT)
- ZIP code: 36467
- Area code: 334
- FIPS code: 01-57120
- GNIS feature ID: 2404437
- Website: www.cityofopp.com

Opp is a city in Covington County, Alabama, United States. At the 2020 census, the population was 6,771. Opp is named after Henry Opp, a lawyer for the Louisville and Nashville Railroad.

== Geography ==
Opp is located in eastern Covington County. It is bordered by the town of Babbie to the west and the town of Horn Hill to the southwest.

U.S. Routes 84 and 331 are the main roads that pass near the city. US 84 bypasses the city to the south and east, leading northeast 16 mi (26 km) to Elba and west 16 mi (26 km) to Andalusia, the county seat of Covington County. US 331 bypasses the city to the east (with US 84), and leads north 22 mi (35 km) to Brantley and south 21 mi (34 km) to Florala, on the Florida state line. Alabama State Route 52 runs southeast 7 mi (11 km) to the town of Kinston from US 84/331.

According to the U.S. Census Bureau, the city has a total area of 24.6 square miles (63.7 km^{2}), of which 23.7 square miles (61.3 km^{2}) is land and 0.93 square miles (2.4 km^{2}), or 3.76%, is water.

== Demographics ==
Historical population
Census	Pop.	Note	%±
1910	863		—
1920	1,556		80.3%
1930	2,918		87.5%
1940	3,178		8.9%
1950	5,240		64.9%
1960	5,535		5.6%
1970	6,493		17.3%
1980	7,204		11.0%
1990	6,985		−3.0%
2000	6,607		−5.4%
2010	6,659		0.8%
2020	6,771		1.7%
U.S. Decennial Census; 2013 Estimate

=== 2020 census ===
As of the 2020 census, Opp had a population of 6,771, with 2,734 households and 1,768 families residing in the city. The median age was 43.2 years. 23.0% of residents were under the age of 18 and 22.7% of residents were 65 years of age or older. For every 100 females there were 85.6 males, and for every 100 females age 18 and over there were 79.5 males age 18 and over.

78.6% of residents lived in urban areas, while 21.4% lived in rural areas.

Of the city's households, 28.5% had children under the age of 18 living in them. 40.7% were married-couple households, 17.0% were households with a male householder and no spouse or partner present, and 35.6% were households with a female householder and no spouse or partner present. About 32.6% of all households were made up of individuals and 16.8% had someone living alone who was 65 years of age or older.

There were 3,133 housing units, of which 12.7% were vacant. The homeowner vacancy rate was 2.5% and the rental vacancy rate was 9.1%.

Opp racial composition
Race	Num.	Perc.
White (non-Hispanic)	5,091	75.19%
Black or African American (non-Hispanic)	1,211	17.89%
Native American	25	0.37%
Asian	29	0.43%
Other/Mixed	278	4.11%
Hispanic or Latino	137	2.02%

=== 2010 census ===
As of the census of 2010, there were 6,659 people and 2,655 households, and 1,823 families residing in the city. The population density was 388 people per square mile. The racial makeup of the city was 80.9% White, 16.7% Black or African American, 0.6% Native American, 0.3% Asian, and 1.2% from two or more races. 0.9% of the population were Hispanic or Latino of any race.

=== 2000 census ===
In 2000, there were 2,753 households, out of which 28.4% had children under the age of 18 living with them, 50.5% were married couples living together, 14.8% had a female householder with no husband present, and 30.8% were non-families. 28.8% of all households were made up of individuals, and 15.0% had someone living alone who was 65 years of age or older. The average household size was 2.33 and the average family size was 2.85.

In the city, the population was 23.3% under the age of 18, 7.9% from 18 to 24, 24.6% from 25 to 44, 23.6% from 45 to 64, and 20.6% who were 65 years of age or older. The median age was 41 years. For every 100 females, there were 79.8 males. For every 100 females age 18 and over, there were 76.9 males. The median income for a household in the city was $26,702, and the median income for a family was $32,436. Males had a median income of $27,821 versus $21,280 for females. The per capita income for the city was $15,281. About 14.2% of families and 18.2% of the population were below the poverty line, including 28.8% of those under age 18 and 15.8% of those age 65 or over.

== Transportation ==
Local dial-a-ride transit service is provided by Covington Area Transit Service.

== Education ==
The city limits is within the Opp City School District.

== Notable people ==
- Lew Childre, entertainer, inventor, musician and member of the Grand Ole Opry
- Mike DuBose, former Alabama Crimson Tide head football coach
- David F. Gantt, New York state legislator
- Thomas K. Hearn, 12th president, Wake Forest University
- Tim Jessie, NFL player
- James Logan, NFL player
- Alberta Martin, penultimate Confederate Widow
- Mooski, entertainer, rapper, song artist
- Lamar Rogers, NFL player
- Peggy Scott-Adams, blues and R&B singer
