= Covington County Board of Education =

School district in Alabama, United States

Covington County Schools (CCS) is a school district in Covington County, Alabama, headquartered in Andalusia.

The district's service area covers all portions of the county except for those in the city limits of Andalusia and the city limits of Opp.

== History ==
In the mid-1950s, during the Civil Rights Movement, the board of trustees denied admittance of a black child to a white school in Andalusia.

== Schools ==
K-12 schools:

- Pleasant Home School (Andalusia postal address)
- Red Level School (Red Level)

High schools:

- Florala High School (Florala)
- Straughn High School (Straughn, Andalusia postal address)

Junior high schools:

- Fleeta Jr. High School (Opp postal address)
- Straughn Middle School (Straughn, Andalusia postal address)

Elementary schools:

- Straughn Elementary School (Straughn, Andalusia postal address)
- W.S. Harlan Elementary School (Lockhart)

== See also ==
Other districts in the county:

- Andalusia City School District
- Opp City School District
