= 2004 United States presidential election in Alabama =

- November 2, 2004
- Turnout: 72.50% ▲

Nominee	George W. Bush	John Kerry
Party	Republican	Democratic
Home state	Texas	Massachusetts
Running mate	Dick Cheney	John Edwards
Electoral vote	9	0
Popular vote	1,176,394	693,933
Percentage	62.46%	36.84%

Bush
50–60%
60–70%
70–80%
80–90%
Kerry
40–50%
50–60%
60–70%
70–80%
80–90%
President before election
George W. Bush
Republican
Elected President
George W. Bush
Republican

The 2004 United States presidential election in Alabama took place on November 2, 2004. Voters chose nine representatives, or electors, to the Electoral College, who voted for president and vice president.

Alabama was won by incumbent President George W. Bush by a 25.62% margin of victory. Prior to the election, all 12 news organizations considered this was a state Bush would win, or otherwise a red state. On election day, it trended Republican sharply, by a swing margin of 10.70% from the 2000 election, the strongest such swing in the nation. Bush won with over 60% of the vote, a first since 1984, and carried most of the counties and congressional districts. Historically, Alabama is a very reliable Republican state that a Democratic presidential nominee has not won since 1976, when Southern governor of Georgia Jimmy Carter ran and swept the Deep South.

== Primaries ==
- 2004 Alabama Democratic presidential primary

== Campaign ==
=== Predictions ===
There were 12 news organizations who made state-by-state predictions of the election. Here are their last predictions before election day.

Source	Ranking
D.C. Political Report	Solid R
Associated Press	Solid R
CNN	Likely R
Cook Political Report	Solid R
Newsweek	Solid R
New York Times	Solid R
Rasmussen Reports	Likely R
Research 2000	Solid R
Washington Post	Likely R
Washington Times	Solid R
Zogby International	Likely R
Washington Dispatch	Likely R

=== Polling ===
Bush won every single pre-election poll, and won each by a double-digit margin of victory. The final three polls averaged Bush leading 58% to 38%.

=== Fundraising ===
Bush raised $3,092,923. Kerry raised $514,589.

=== Advertising and visits ===
Neither campaign advertised or visited this state during the fall campaign.

== Analysis ==
Bush easily won every poll taken in the state prior to the election. Kerry won a small section of counties in the middle of the state, including winning Alabama's 7th congressional district. In 2000, the state voted for Bush 56%–41% by fifteen points; this year it voted for him by 25 points.

With the exception of Oklahoma in 2004, the state was also Bush's best performance in the South, with not even Texas, Bush's home state, voting as red as Alabama.

In a year that saw the highest turnout rate amongst eligible voters since 1968, Alabama was the only state in the country in which Kerry received less votes than Al Gore statewide (1,669 less votes). In every other state across the country both Bush and Kerry received more votes statewide for their parties than in the previous election in 2000.

CNN exit polls showed that almost 70% of male voters voted for Bush as did 99% of registered Republicans (which made up 48% of the population). 43% of the state describe themselves as evangelical Christians, and 88% of them voted for Bush. 62% of the state approved of Bush, and 60% approved of the decision to go to war in Iraq. 82% of white men and 79% of white women voted for Bush. Finally, 70% of voters over the age of 60 voted for Bush. Alabama was racially divided: Alabama Whites voted 80%–19% for Bush while Blacks voted 91%-9% for Kerry.

As of the 2024 presidential election, Bush is the last Republican to carry Jefferson County (home of Birmingham, the state's largest city) in a presidential election. Majority-black Marengo County wouldn't vote Republican again until 2024.

== Results ==
2004 United States presidential election in Alabama
Party	Candidate	Votes	Percentage	Electoral votes
Republican	George W. Bush (incumbent)	1,176,394	62.46%	9
Democratic	John Kerry	693,933	36.84%	0
Independent	Ralph Nader	6,701	0.36%	0
Independent	Michael Badnarik	3,529	0.19%	0
Independent	Michael Peroutka	1,994	0.11%	0
Write Ins		898	0.05%	0
Totals		1,883,449	100.00%	9
Voter turnout (voting-age population)				55.5%

=== By county ===
County	George W. Bush Republican		John Kerry Democratic		Various candidates Other parties		Margin		Total
County	#	%	#	%	#	%	#	%	Total
Autauga	15,196	75.67%	4,758	23.69%	127	0.63%	10,438	51.98%	20,081
Baldwin	52,971	76.42%	15,599	22.50%	750	1.09%	37,372	53.92%	69,320
Barbour	5,899	54.74%	4,832	44.84%	46	0.43%	1,067	9.90%	10,777
Bibb	5,472	72.00%	2,089	27.49%	39	0.51%	3,383	44.51%	7,600
Blount	17,386	80.85%	3,938	18.31%	180	0.84%	13,448	62.54%	21,504
Bullock	1,494	31.67%	3,210	68.05%	13	0.28%	-1,716	-36.38%	4,717
Butler	4,979	59.16%	3,413	40.55%	24	0.29%	1,566	18.61%	8,416
Calhoun	29,814	65.89%	15,083	33.33%	352	0.78%	14,731	32.56%	45,249
Chambers	7,622	58.49%	5,347	41.03%	63	0.48%	2,275	17.46%	13,032
Cherokee	5,923	65.45%	3,040	33.59%	86	0.96%	2,883	31.86%	9,049
Chilton	12,829	76.85%	3,778	22.63%	86	0.52%	9,051	54.22%	16,693
Choctaw	3,897	53.92%	3,303	45.70%	27	0.37%	594	8.22%	7,227
Clarke	6,730	59.07%	4,627	40.61%	37	0.32%	2,103	18.46%	11,394
Clay	4,624	70.32%	1,893	28.79%	59	0.90%	2,731	41.53%	6,576
Cleburne	4,370	75.37%	1,391	23.99%	37	0.63%	2,979	51.38%	5,798
Coffee	13,019	73.90%	4,480	25.43%	117	0.66%	8,539	48.47%	17,616
Colbert	13,188	55.10%	10,598	44.28%	149	0.62%	2,590	10.82%	23,935
Conecuh	3,271	54.33%	2,719	45.16%	31	0.51%	552	9.17%	6,021
Coosa	2,905	58.09%	2,055	41.09%	41	0.82%	850	17.00%	5,001
Covington	11,119	76.02%	3,423	23.40%	85	0.58%	7,696	52.62%	14,627
Crenshaw	3,777	68.67%	1,698	30.87%	25	0.46%	2,079	37.80%	5,500
Cullman	26,818	76.21%	8,045	22.86%	328	0.93%	18,773	53.35%	35,191
Dale	13,621	74.71%	4,484	24.60%	126	0.69%	9,137	50.11%	18,231
Dallas	7,335	39.49%	11,175	60.17%	63	0.34%	-3,840	-20.68%	18,573
DeKalb	16,904	69.94%	7,092	29.34%	173	0.72%	9,812	40.60%	24,169
Elmore	22,056	76.90%	6,471	22.56%	153	0.53%	15,585	54.34%	28,680
Escambia	8,513	68.68%	3,814	30.77%	68	0.55%	4,699	37.91%	12,395
Etowah	26,999	63.26%	15,328	35.91%	353	0.83%	11,671	27.35%	42,680
Fayette	5,534	69.16%	2,408	30.09%	60	0.74%	3,126	39.07%	8,002
Franklin	7,690	62.68%	4,514	36.79%	65	0.53%	3,176	25.89%	12,269
Geneva	8,342	79.30%	2,113	20.09%	65	0.62%	6,229	59.21%	10,520
Greene	958	20.18%	3,764	79.28%	26	0.54%	-2,806	-59.10%	4,748
Hale	3,281	41.30%	4,631	58.29%	33	0.42%	-1,350	-16.99%	7,945
Henry	4,881	66.31%	2,452	33.31%	28	0.38%	2,429	33.00%	7,361
Houston	26,874	74.24%	9,144	25.26%	183	0.50%	17,730	48.98%	36,201
Jackson	11,534	56.76%	8,635	42.49%	152	0.75%	2,899	14.27%	20,321
Jefferson	158,680	54.16%	132,286	45.15%	2,001	0.68%	26,394	9.01%	292,967
Lamar	4,894	71.08%	1,956	28.41%	35	0.51%	2,938	42.67%	6,885
Lauderdale	22,161	59.72%	14,628	39.42%	318	0.86%	7,533	20.30%	37,107
Lawrence	7,730	55.21%	6,155	43.96%	116	0.82%	1,575	11.25%	14,001
Lee	27,972	62.70%	16,227	36.38%	411	0.92%	11,745	26.32%	44,610
Limestone	19,702	67.77%	9,126	31.39%	245	0.84%	10,576	36.38%	29,073
Lowndes	1,786	29.66%	4,233	70.30%	2	0.03%	-2,447	-40.64%	6,021
Macon	1,570	16.69%	7,800	82.92%	37	0.39%	-6,230	-66.23%	9,407
Madison	77,173	58.88%	52,644	40.17%	1,245	0.95%	24,529	18.71%	131,062
Marengo	5,255	50.91%	5,037	48.80%	30	0.29%	218	2.11%	10,322
Marion	8,983	69.77%	3,808	29.58%	84	0.65%	5,175	40.19%	12,875
Marshall	22,783	72.35%	8,452	26.84%	256	0.81%	14,331	45.51%	31,491
Mobile	92,014	58.69%	63,732	40.65%	1,025	0.65%	28,282	18.04%	156,771
Monroe	5,831	61.16%	3,666	38.45%	37	0.39%	2,165	22.71%	9,534
Montgomery	44,097	49.19%	45,160	50.37%	393	0.44%	-1,063	-1.18%	89,650
Morgan	32,477	69.09%	14,131	30.06%	399	0.85%	18,346	39.03%	47,007
Perry	1,738	31.47%	3,767	68.21%	18	0.33%	-2,029	-36.74%	5,523
Pickens	5,170	56.61%	3,915	42.87%	47	0.51%	1,255	13.74%	9,132
Pike	7,483	62.97%	4,334	36.47%	66	0.56%	3,149	26.50%	11,883
Randolph	6,127	68.07%	2,817	31.30%	57	0.63%	3,310	36.77%	9,001
Russell	8,337	49.60%	8,375	49.82%	97	0.57%	-38	-0.22%	16,809
Shelby	63,435	80.39%	14,850	18.82%	621	0.79%	48,585	61.57%	78,906
St. Clair	23,500	80.59%	5,456	18.71%	205	0.70%	18,044	61.88%	29,161
Sumter	1,880	29.22%	4,527	70.37%	26	0.40%	-2,647	-41.15%	6,433
Talladega	18,331	61.31%	11,374	38.04%	193	0.65%	6,957	23.27%	29,898
Tallapoosa	12,392	69.03%	5,451	30.36%	109	0.61%	6,941	38.67%	17,952
Tuscaloosa	42,877	61.40%	26,447	37.87%	506	0.73%	16,430	23.53%	69,830
Walker	19,167	67.57%	9,016	31.78%	184	0.65%	10,151	35.79%	28,367
Washington	5,060	61.36%	3,145	38.14%	42	0.51%	1,915	23.22%	8,247
Wilcox	1,834	32.28%	3,838	67.55%	10	0.18%	-2,004	-35.27%	5,682
Winston	8,130	78.00%	2,236	21.45%	57	0.55%	5,894	56.55%	10,423
Totals	1,176,394	62.46%	693,933	36.84%	13,122	0.70%	482,461	25.62%	1,883,449

==== Counties that flipped from Democratic to Republican ====
- Barbour (Largest city: Eufaula)
- Choctaw (Largest city: Butler)
- Colbert (Largest city: Muscle Shoals)
- Conecuh (Largest city: Evergreen)
- Jackson (Largest city: Scottsboro)
- Lawrence (Largest city: Moulton)
- Marengo (Largest city: Linden)

=== By congressional district ===
Bush won six of seven congressional districts, including one held by a Democrat.

District	Bush	Kerry	Representative
1st	64%	35%	Jo Bonner
2nd	67%	33%	Terry Everett
3rd	58%	41%	Mike D. Rogers
4th	71%	28%	Robert Aderholt
5th	60%	39%	Bud Cramer
6th	78%	22%	Spencer Bachus
7th	35%	64%	Artur Davis

== Electors ==
Technically the voters of Alabama cast their ballots for electors: representatives to the Electoral College. Alabama is allocated 9 electors because it has 7 congressional districts and 2 senators. All candidates who appear on the ballot or qualify to receive write-in votes must submit a list of 9 electors, who pledge to vote for their candidate and his or her running mate. Whoever wins the majority of votes in the state is awarded all 9 electoral votes. Their chosen electors then vote for president and vice president. Although electors are pledged to their candidate and running mate, they are not obligated to vote for them. An elector who votes for someone other than his or her candidate is known as a faithless elector.

The electors of each state and the District of Columbia met on December 13, 2004, to cast their votes for president and vice president. The Electoral College itself never meets as one body. Instead the electors from each state and the District of Columbia met in their respective capitols.

The following were the members of the Electoral College from the state. All were pledged to and voted for George W. Bush and Dick Cheney.

1. Beth Chapman
2. Marty Connors
3. Martha Hosey
4. Will Sellers
5. Mike Hubbard
6. Floyd Lawson
7. Elbert Peters
8. Bettye Fine Collins
9. Martha Stokes

== See also ==
- United States presidential elections in Alabama
