= Huxford, Alabama =

Unincorporated community in Alabama, United States

- Unincorporated community
- Location within Alabama Location within the United States
- Coordinates: 31°13′13″N 87°27′43″W
- Country: United States
- State: Alabama
- County: Escambia
- Elevation: 335 ft (102 m)

Population
  - Total: 197
- Time zone: UTC-6 (Central (CST))
  - Summer (DST): UTC-5 (CDT)
- ZIP code: 36543
- Area code: 251
- GNIS feature ID: 151842

Huxford is an unincorporated community in Escambia County, Alabama, United States. Huxford is located near Alabama State Route 21, 13.7 miles (22.0 km) north of Atmore. Huxford had a post office until November 5, 2011; it still has its own ZIP code, 36543. Huxford is located along the route of the Federal Road. Huxford has a population of 197 people.
