= Escambia County High School (Alabama) =

Public school in Alabama, United States

Coordinates: 31.0070°N 87.4869°W

Location
- 1215 South Presley Street; Atmore, (Escambia County), Alabama 36502; United States

Information
- Type: Public high school
- Principal: LaTonya Gill
- Staff: 22.00 (FTE)
- Enrollment: 405 (2023-2024)
- Student to teacher ratio: 18.41
- Colors: Blue and white
- Nickname: Blue Devils
- Website: echs.escambiak12.net

Escambia County High School (ECHS) is a public high school in Atmore, Alabama. It is a part of the Escambia County Public School System.

== History ==
It was the first public high school established by a county school district in Alabama with funds from the county and the state government. W.S. Neal, the superintendent of the Escambia County school system, had suggested the idea circa 1896. He later lost a subsequent election for his post, with the high school proposal being a campaign issue. William Carney funded the high school despite Neal's election loss. A building for the high school opened in 1909.

On March 2, 1925, all but seven voters voted participating in a bond election voted in favor of building a new Escambia County High for $40,000.

The current campus opened in 1960.

The Escambia County Historical Society enacted a marker at the 1909-1960 site in 2011 commemorating the school.

In 2022 Kike Pettaway became the principal.

== Notable alumni ==
- Ms Governor
- Ms Aura
- Chef Rob
- Carl Madison — American football coach
- Don McNeal — NFL player
- Ron Middleton — NFL player
- Art White — NFL player. attended Atmore High School
- Michael Williams — NFL player
- Luverne Wise — first female player to score on a men's American football team, attended Atmore High School
