= Atmore Municipal Airport =

Airport in Alabama, United States of America

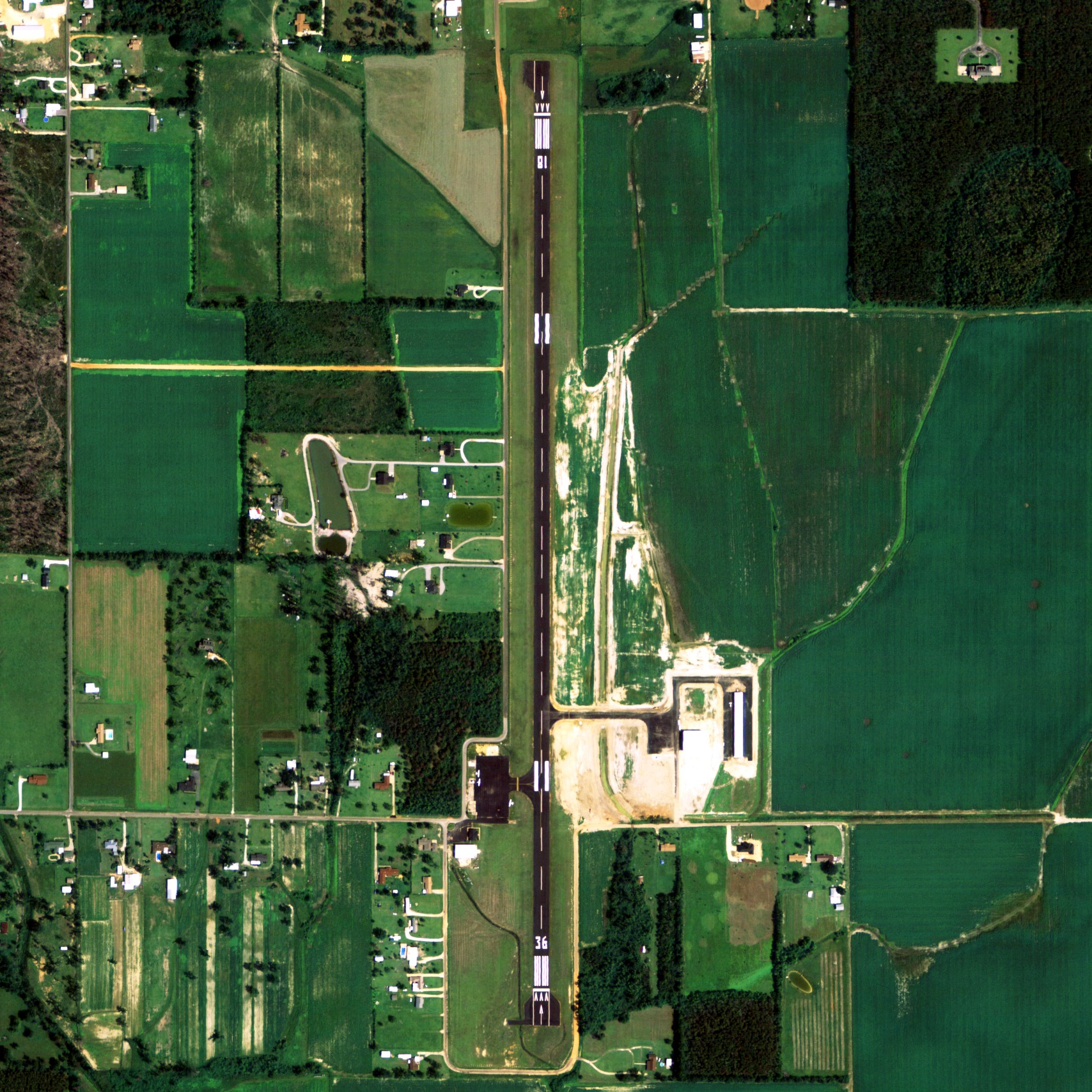
- NAIP aerial image, 30 June 2006
- IATA: none; ICAO: none; FAA LID: 0R1

Summary
- Airport type: Public
- Owner: Atmore, Alabama
- Serves: Atmore, Alabama
- Elevation AMSL: 287 ft (87 m)
- Coordinates: 31°00′58″N 087°26′48″W

Map
- Location of airport in Alabama 0R1 (the United States)

Runways
Direction	Length		Surface
Direction	ft	m	Surface
18/36	5,209	1,588	Asphalt

Statistics (2017)
- Aircraft operations: 3,870
- Based aircraft: 11
- Source: Federal Aviation Administration

Atmore Municipal Airport (FAA LID: 0R1) is a city-owned public-use airport located 3 nautical miles (6 km) east of the central business district of Atmore, a city in Escambia County, Alabama, United States. According to the FAA's National Plan of Integrated Airport Systems for 2009–2013, it is categorized as a general aviation facility.

== Facilities and aircraft ==
Atmore Municipal Airport covers an area of 43 acres (0.07 sq mi; 0.17 km^{2}) which contains one runway designated 18/36 is 5,209 x 80 feet (1,588 x 24 meters) asphalt pavement. For the 12-month period ending February 26, 2007, the airport had 3,870 general aviation aircraft operations. In 2017, the city of Atmore extended the runway length to its current length of 5,209 feet from its previous length of 4,950 feet.

== See also ==
- List of airports in Alabama
