= Freemanville, Alabama =

Unincorporated community in Alabama, United States

- Unincorporated community
- Location within Alabama Location within the United States
- Coordinates: 31°04′19″N 87°31′15″W
- Country: United States
- State: Alabama
- County: Escambia
- Elevation: 289 ft (88 m)
- Time zone: UTC-6 (Central (CST))
  - Summer (DST): UTC-5 (CDT)
- Area code: 251
- GNIS feature ID: 118629

Freemanville is an unincorporated community in Escambia County, Alabama, United States, near Atmore.

A post office operated in Freemanville from 1908 to 1955.
