= Atmore Movie Theater =

Coordinates: 31°1′24″N 87°29′38.9″W

The Strand Theater is a movie theater in Atmore, Alabama. The theater operated from 1923 until November 2013. It became a private show theater and concert hall. With the Encore attached next door, it became an event space, for activities such as bingo or the Atmore Mardi Gras Ball. The theater hosts a music studio upstairs for aspiring artists. This space also provides art classes to Rachel Patterson Elementary School due to funding cuts.

== Reconstruction ==
The Pride of Atmore community group came together to restore the theater. The theater underwent a complete interior and exterior renovation that added a new lobby, marquee, and theater area.

The building next door was home to a hardware store that stood for 122 years and was restored along with the theater. The Atmore Hardware building was renovated into a space for live music, rentals and community events. The cost of restoring both buildings came to over $5.2 million, funded by donations and grants from foundations and local businesses.
