= 1996 United States presidential election in Alabama =

- November 5, 1996
- Turnout: 62.05% ▼

Nominee	Bob Dole	Bill Clinton	Ross Perot
Party	Republican	Democratic	Independent
Alliance			Reform
Home state	Kansas	Arkansas	Texas
Running mate	Jack Kemp	Al Gore	Pat Choate
Electoral vote	9	0	0
Popular vote	769,044	662,165	92,149
Percentage	50.12%	43.16%	6.01%

Dole
40–50%
50–60%
60–70%
70–80%
Clinton
40–50%
50–60%
60–70%
70–80%
80–90%
President before election
Bill Clinton
Democratic
Elected President
Bill Clinton
Democratic

The 1996 United States presidential election in Alabama took place on November 5, 1996, as part of the 1996 United States presidential election. Voters chose nine representatives, or electors to the Electoral College, who voted for president and vice president.

Alabama was won by Senator Bob Dole (R-KS), with Dole winning 50.12% to 43.16% over President Bill Clinton (D) by a margin of 6.96%. Billionaire businessman Ross Perot (Reform-TX, although listed as an "Independent" in Alabama) finished in third, with 6.01% of the popular vote.

President Clinton became the first Democrat to carry Montgomery County since Adlai Stevenson II in 1952, as well as the first to win two terms without ever carrying the state. As of the 2024 presidential election, this is the last time a Democrat has carried any of the following counties: Butler, Chambers, Cherokee, Clarke, Coosa, Crenshaw, Etowah, Fayette, Franklin, Marion, Pickens, Walker and Washington.

No subsequent Democratic presidential nominee has been able to match Clinton's 43.16% popular vote share. As of 2024, this remains the last time that Alabama was decided by a single-digit margin.

Among white voters, 62% supported Dole, while 29% supported Clinton. 8% supported Perot.

== Results ==
1996 United States presidential election in Alabama
Party	Candidate	Running mate	Votes	Percentage	Electoral votes
Republican	Bob Dole	Jack Kemp	769,044	50.12%	9
Democratic	Bill Clinton (incumbent)	Al Gore (incumbent)	662,165	43.16%	0
Independent	Ross Perot	Patrick Choate	92,149	6.01%	0
Libertarian	Harry Browne	Jo Jorgensen	5,290	0.34%	0
U.S. Taxpayers' Party	Howard Phillips	Herbert Titus	2,365	0.15%	0
Natural Law	Dr. John Hagelin	Dr. V. Tompkins	1,697	0.11%	0
No party	Write-in		1,123	0.07%	0
No party	James Harris	Laura Garza	516	0.03%	0

=== Results by county ===
County	Bob Dole Republican		Bill Clinton Democratic		Ross Perot Independent		Various candidates Other parties		Margin		Total
County	#	%	#	%	#	%	#	%	#	%	Total
Autauga	9,509	61.66%	5,015	32.52%	813	5.27%	85	0.55%	4,494	29.14%	15,422
Baldwin	29,487	62.58%	12,776	27.11%	4,520	9.59%	336	0.71%	16,711	35.47%	47,119
Barbour	3,627	40.51%	4,787	53.47%	515	5.75%	24	0.27%	-1,160	-12.96%	8,953
Bibb	3,037	48.20%	2,775	44.04%	455	7.22%	34	0.54%	262	4.16%	6,301
Blount	9,056	59.09%	5,061	33.02%	985	6.43%	225	1.47%	3,995	26.07%	15,327
Bullock	1,154	26.32%	3,078	70.21%	111	2.53%	41	0.94%	-1,924	-43.89%	4,384
Butler	3,352	43.14%	3,828	49.27%	538	6.92%	52	0.67%	-476	-6.13%	7,770
Calhoun	18,088	49.00%	15,725	42.60%	2,613	7.08%	485	1.31%	2,363	6.40%	36,911
Chambers	4,707	42.42%	5,515	49.70%	812	7.32%	63	0.57%	-808	-7.28%	11,097
Cherokee	3,048	36.20%	4,399	52.24%	899	10.68%	75	0.89%	-1,351	-16.04%	8,421
Chilton	7,910	55.40%	5,354	37.50%	929	6.51%	85	0.60%	2,556	17.90%	14,278
Choctaw	2,623	36.78%	4,074	57.13%	413	5.79%	21	0.29%	-1,451	-20.35%	7,131
Clarke	4,785	47.29%	4,831	47.75%	478	4.72%	24	0.24%	-46	-0.46%	10,118
Clay	2,694	48.38%	2,306	41.42%	538	9.66%	30	0.54%	388	6.96%	5,568
Cleburne	2,063	48.64%	1,737	40.96%	385	9.08%	56	1.32%	326	7.68%	4,241
Coffee	7,805	55.12%	5,168	36.50%	1,042	7.36%	144	1.02%	2,637	18.62%	14,159
Colbert	8,305	40.88%	10,226	50.33%	1,696	8.35%	91	0.45%	-1,921	-9.45%	20,318
Conecuh	2,093	38.33%	2,903	53.16%	445	8.15%	20	0.37%	-810	-14.83%	5,461
Coosa	1,721	41.66%	2,121	51.34%	262	6.34%	27	0.65%	-400	-9.68%	4,131
Covington	6,035	50.66%	4,543	38.13%	1,098	9.22%	237	1.99%	1,492	12.53%	11,913
Crenshaw	1,939	43.60%	2,172	48.84%	317	7.13%	19	0.43%	-233	-5.24%	4,447
Cullman	14,308	53.88%	9,544	35.94%	2,440	9.19%	261	0.98%	4,764	17.94%	26,553
Dale	8,288	57.84%	4,732	33.02%	1,216	8.49%	94	0.66%	3,556	24.82%	14,330
Dallas	6,612	37.45%	10,507	59.52%	477	2.70%	58	0.33%	-3,895	-22.07%	17,654
DeKalb	9,823	54.14%	6,544	36.07%	1,609	8.87%	167	0.92%	3,279	18.07%	18,143
Elmore	12,937	61.76%	6,530	31.18%	1,368	6.53%	111	0.53%	6,407	30.58%	20,946
Escambia	5,214	46.96%	4,651	41.89%	867	7.81%	372	3.35%	563	5.07%	11,104
Etowah	16,835	44.82%	17,976	47.86%	2,529	6.73%	221	0.59%	-1,141	-3.04%	37,561
Fayette	3,191	44.26%	3,381	46.90%	590	8.18%	47	0.65%	-190	-2.64%	7,209
Franklin	4,449	42.44%	5,028	47.97%	966	9.22%	39	0.37%	-579	-5.53%	10,482
Geneva	4,725	52.60%	3,174	35.33%	857	9.54%	227	2.53%	1,551	17.27%	8,983
Greene	796	17.99%	3,526	79.70%	55	1.24%	47	1.06%	-2,730	-61.71%	4,424
Hale	1,893	34.59%	3,372	61.61%	190	3.47%	18	0.33%	-1,479	-27.02%	5,473
Henry	3,082	46.44%	3,019	45.49%	515	7.76%	21	0.32%	63	0.95%	6,637
Houston	17,476	62.27%	8,791	31.33%	1,653	5.89%	143	0.51%	8,685	30.94%	28,063
Jackson	5,650	36.32%	8,204	52.73%	1,573	10.11%	131	0.84%	-2,554	-16.41%	15,558
Jefferson	130,980	50.20%	120,208	46.07%	7,997	3.07%	1,721	0.66%	10,772	4.13%	260,906
Lamar	2,955	46.10%	2,843	44.35%	597	9.31%	15	0.23%	112	1.75%	6,410
Lauderdale	14,058	46.19%	13,619	44.75%	2,574	8.46%	185	0.61%	439	1.44%	30,436
Lawrence	3,893	38.38%	5,254	51.80%	964	9.50%	32	0.32%	-1,361	-13.42%	10,143
Lee	17,985	54.15%	12,919	38.90%	1,949	5.87%	361	1.09%	5,066	15.25%	33,214
Limestone	10,862	52.52%	8,045	38.90%	1,659	8.02%	116	0.56%	2,817	13.62%	20,682
Lowndes	1,369	25.16%	3,970	72.96%	72	1.32%	30	0.55%	-2,601	-47.80%	5,441
Macon	987	12.03%	7,018	85.55%	150	1.83%	48	0.59%	-6,031	-73.52%	8,203
Madison	50,390	49.96%	42,259	41.90%	7,437	7.37%	772	0.77%	8,131	8.06%	100,858
Marengo	4,013	43.18%	4,899	52.71%	337	3.63%	45	0.48%	-886	-9.53%	9,294
Marion	4,742	43.79%	5,049	46.62%	979	9.04%	60	0.55%	-307	-2.83%	10,830
Marshall	12,323	52.89%	8,722	37.43%	2,150	9.23%	105	0.45%	3,601	15.46%	23,300
Mobile	66,775	51.32%	54,749	42.08%	7,555	5.81%	1,024	0.79%	12,026	9.24%	130,103
Monroe	4,382	50.38%	3,815	43.86%	486	5.59%	15	0.17%	567	6.52%	8,698
Montgomery	37,784	47.98%	38,382	48.74%	2,036	2.59%	542	0.69%	-598	-0.76%	78,744
Morgan	21,765	54.39%	14,616	36.53%	3,348	8.37%	284	0.71%	7,149	17.86%	40,013
Perry	1,703	28.85%	4,053	68.66%	119	2.02%	28	0.47%	-2,350	-39.81%	5,903
Pickens	3,322	42.74%	4,018	51.69%	403	5.18%	30	0.39%	-696	-8.95%	7,773
Pike	5,281	51.07%	4,514	43.65%	503	4.86%	43	0.42%	767	7.42%	10,341
Randolph	3,304	47.41%	3,023	43.38%	603	8.65%	39	0.56%	281	4.03%	6,969
Russell	5,025	36.69%	7,834	57.20%	792	5.78%	44	0.32%	-2,809	-20.51%	13,695
St. Clair	12,762	62.29%	6,187	30.20%	1,417	6.92%	123	0.60%	6,575	32.09%	20,489
Shelby	37,090	73.05%	11,280	22.22%	2,035	4.01%	368	0.72%	25,810	50.83%	50,773
Sumter	1,561	24.18%	4,706	72.89%	172	2.66%	17	0.26%	-3,145	-48.71%	6,456
Talladega	10,931	47.99%	10,385	45.59%	1,335	5.86%	127	0.56%	546	2.40%	22,778
Tallapoosa	7,627	51.48%	6,071	40.98%	1,038	7.01%	79	0.53%	1,556	10.50%	14,815
Tuscaloosa	27,939	51.38%	23,067	42.42%	3,048	5.60%	328	0.60%	4,872	8.96%	54,382
Walker	9,837	39.44%	12,929	51.84%	2,012	8.07%	161	0.65%	-3,092	-12.40%	24,939
Washington	2,900	37.68%	3,935	51.12%	819	10.64%	43	0.56%	-1,035	-13.44%	7,697
Wilcox	1,454	30.00%	3,303	68.15%	71	1.46%	19	0.39%	-1,849	-38.15%	4,847
Winston	4,728	54.80%	3,120	36.17%	723	8.38%	56	0.65%	1,608	18.63%	8,627
Totals	769,044	50.12%	662,165	43.16%	92,149	6.01%	10,991	0.72%	106,879	6.96%	1,534,349

==== Counties that flipped from Democratic to Republican ====
- Lauderdale

==== Counties that flipped from Republican to Democratic ====
- Clarke
- Montgomery

==== By congressional district ====
Dole won six of the state's seven congressional districts, including one which elected a Democrat.

District	Dole	Clinton	Perot	Representative
1st	53%	40%	7%	Sonny Callahan
2nd	56%	38%	6%	Terry Everett
3rd	49%	44%	7%	Glen Browder
3rd	49%	44%	7%	Bob Riley
4th	48%	43%	9%	Tom Bevill
4th	48%	43%	9%	Robert Aderholt
5th	49%	43%	8%	Bud Cramer
6th	68%	28%	4%	Spencer Bachus
7th	26%	72%	2%	Earl Hilliard

== See also ==
- United States presidential elections in Alabama
