= Ron Middleton (American football) =

American football coach and former player (born 1965)

Miami Dolphins
- Title: Tight ends coach

Personal information
- Born: July 17, 1965 (age 61); Atmore, Alabama, U.S.
- Listed height: 6 ft 2 in (1.88 m)
- Listed weight: 262 lb (119 kg)

Career information
- Position: Tight end (No. 87, 86, 47)
- High school: Escambia County (Atmore)
- College: Auburn (1982-1985)
- NFL draft: 1986: undrafted

Career history

Playing
- Atlanta Falcons (1986–1987); Washington Redskins (1988); Tampa Bay Buccaneers (1989)*; Cleveland Browns (1989); Washington Redskins (1990–1993); Los Angeles Rams (1994); San Diego Chargers (1995)
- * Offseason or practice squad member only

Coaching
- Troy (1997–1998) Tight ends coach, offensive tackles coach & assistant special teams coach; Ole Miss (1999–2001) Tight ends coach & special teams coach; Ole Miss (2002–2003) Running backs coach & special teams coach; Tampa Bay Buccaneers (2004–2006) Tight ends coach & assistant special teams coach; Alabama (2007) Tight ends coach & special teams coach; Duke (2008–2012) Assistant head coach, tight ends coach & special teams coach; Jacksonville Jaguars (2013–2020) Tight ends coach & assistant special teams coach; New York Jets (2021–2024) Tight ends coach; Miami Dolphins (2026–present) Tight ends coach

Awards and highlights
- Super Bowl champion (XXVI)

Career NFL statistics
- Receptions: 42
- Receiving yards: 266
- Receiving touchdowns: 3
- Stats at Pro Football Reference

Ronald Allen Middleton (born July 17, 1965) is an American football coach and former tight end who is the tight ends coach for the Miami Dolphins of the National Football League (NFL). Middeton played college football for the Auburn Tigers and in the NFL from 1986 to 1995, including for the Washington Redskins (1990-1993). He has coached college teams including the Troy Trojans, Ole Miss Rebels, and the Duke Blue Devils, and in the NFL for the Tampa Bay Buccaneers, Jacksonville Jaguars, and New York Jets.

== Early life ==
Middleton was born on July 17, 1965 in Atmore, Alabama to teenage parents. He and his sister were raised by their great-grandmother. Middleton attended Escambia County High School. In 9th grade, he attempted to quit football to play trumpet in band, dreaming of becoming a rock star, but his coach convinced him to focus on football. He graduated in 1982 at age 16 and attended Auburn University, where he played tight end under Pat Dye and Wayne Bolt. The Auburn Tigers had three bowl game wins while he was part of the team. He graduated with a degree in pre-law and history.

== Playing career ==
Middleton joined the Atlanta Falcons in 1986 as an undrafted free agent. He spent two years there before joining the Cleveland Browns, where he played in an AFC Championship Game. By 1989, he had been released by the Washington Redskins four times, a club record, but successfully made the roster in 1990. Under Joe Gibbs, he started 45 of 62 games over 5 seasons, 12 of those games being during the 1991 season leading up to the Super Bowl XXVI, where Washington beat the Buffalo Bills 37–24. In 1994, he moved to the Los Angeles Rams, then played the 1995 season with the San Diego Chargers before retiring.

== Coaching career ==
After retiring from playing in 1995, Middleton enrolled in a course to prep for the LSAT but quickly decided he was more interested in being involved in football. His friends convinced him to try coaching. He joined Troy University in Troy, Alabama, as the tight ends coach in 1997 and expanded his focus to include offensive tackles. He was also assistant special teams coach. After two seasons, he joined Ole Miss as tight ends coach. By the end of his five season run, he was also running backs coach and special teams coordinator and had coached players including Jonathan Nichols. He was added to the Tampa Bay Buccaneers coaching staff in 2003 as part of the Bill Walsh Diversity Coaching Fellowship Program, then joined the team full-time in 2004 under Coach Jon Gruden. Gruden chose him to attend the NFL's Coaches Career Development Symposium in 2006.

Middleton spent the 2007 season at University of Alabama before accepting a position under David Cutcliffe at Duke University. At Duke, he coached Ross Martin, Will Monday, and Cooper Helfet. After 5 years there, Middleton accepted a tight ends and assistant special teams coach position for the Jacksonville Jaguars. During his 8-year tenure, he worked under coaches Gus Bradley and Doug Marrone and coached players such as Marcedes Lewis, James O'Shaughnessy, and Clay Harbor. Marrone and his coaching staff were let go after the 2020 season. He then joined Robert Saleh's New York Jets staff. In Week 16 of the 2021 season, Middleton served as the acting Head Coach after Saleh tested positive for COVID-19. The Jets won over the Jacksonville Jaguars 26–21 on December 26. In New York, Middleton has worked with young players including Jeremy Ruckert, Tyler Conklin, C. J. Uzomah, and Ryan Griffin.

Middleton was the head coach at the 2022 Senior Bowl for the National Team, which included players such as Jesse Luketa, Boye Mafe, Perrion Winfrey, J. T. Woods, Rachaad White, and Abram Smith, when the Jets were chosen to be one of the coaching staffs for the game. They beat opposing coach Duce Staley's team 20–10. In May 2024, Middleton and Shawn Jefferson were invited to attend the NFL's coaching accelerator program at the league's spring meetings, which allowed them to meet with team owners.

On January 29, 2025, Middleton and the Jets parted ways.

On February 13, 2026, the Miami Dolphins hired Middleton as their tight ends coach under new head coach Jeff Hafley.

== Personal life ==
Middleton is married to Kalita and has four children, Desmon, Ron, Zaria, and Mariah. In 1998, he earned a Master's degree in sports and fitness management from Troy University. He was inducted into the Atmore Area Hall of Fame in 2013.
