= 2024 United States presidential election in Alabama =

- November 5, 2024
- Turnout: 58.5% (▼4.6 pp)

Nominee	Donald Trump	Kamala Harris
Party	Republican	Democratic
Home state	Florida	California
Running mate	JD Vance	Tim Walz
Electoral vote	9	0
Popular vote	1,462,616	772,412
Percentage	64.57%	34.10%

Trump
40–50%
50–60%
60–70%
70–80%
80–90%
90–100%
Harris
40–50%
50–60%
60–70%
70–80%
80–90%
90–100%
Tie/No data
President before election
Joe Biden
Democratic
Elected President
Donald Trump
Republican

The 2024 United States presidential election in Alabama took place on Tuesday, November 5, 2024, as part of the 2024 United States elections in which all 50 states plus the District of Columbia will participate. Alabama chose electors to represent them in the Electoral College via a popular vote. The state of Alabama has nine electoral votes in the Electoral College, following reapportionment due to the 2020 United States census in which the state neither gained nor lost a seat.

Alabama voted for the Republican nominee, Donald Trump, by a comfortable margin in the election, with him winning the state by 30.47%. This was the largest Republican win in the state since 1972, against the backdrop of Richard Nixon's 49-state landslide re-election. Prior to the election, all major news organizations marked Alabama a safe red state.

Turnout noticeably fell, with Harris receiving over 70,000 fewer votes than Biden, while Trump increased his raw vote total by over 20,000. Harris had the lowest vote share of any Democratic nominee in Alabama since 1972, slightly less than Hillary Clinton’s 34.36% in 2016.

Trump's best performance was in ancestrally Republican Winston County, while Harris's strongest performance was in Macon County, a rural, sparsely populated Black Belt county. Trump only flipped Marengo County, another Black Belt county that had not voted for a Republican since George W. Bush in 2004. Democrats have not won a presidential election in Alabama since 1976.

== Primary elections ==
=== Democratic primary ===
The Alabama Democratic primary was held on Super Tuesday, March 5, 2024.

2024 Alabama Democratic primary
Candidate	Votes	%	Delegates
Joe Biden (incumbent)	168,080	89.50	52
Dean Phillips	8,442	4.50	0
Uncommitted	11,283	6.01	0
Total	187,805	100%	52

=== Republican primary ===
The Alabama Republican primary was held on Super Tuesday, March 5, 2024.

Alabama Republican primary, March 5, 2024
Candidate	Votes	Percentage	Actual delegate count		
Candidate	Votes	Percentage	Bound	Unbound	Total
Donald Trump	499,147	83.20%	50	0	50
Nikki Haley	77,989	13.00%	0	0	0
Uncommitted	9,807	1.63%	0	0	0
Ron DeSantis (withdrawn)	8,452	1.41%	0	0	0
Vivek Ramaswamy (withdrawn)	1,864	0.31%	0	0	0
Chris Christie (withdrawn)	1,442	0.24%	0	0	0
David Stuckenberg	752	0.13%	0	0	0
Ryan Binkley	509	0.08%	0	0	0
Total:	599,962	100.00%	50	0	50

== General election ==
On April 9, 2024, Alabama Secretary of State Wes Allen informed the Democratic National Committee that state law would not permit certification in time to include President Biden on the November ballot, as the 2024 Democratic National Convention (DNC) was to take place days after the state deadline of August 15. The following month, legislation was approved extending the deadline to August 23, one day after the conclusion of the DNC, allowing Biden to appear on the ballot. In early August, after Vice President Kamala Harris replaced Biden in the race, Democrats held a virtual convention to nominate Harris, a process then formalized at the DNC convention. The day after the convention's conclusion, the Alabama Democratic Party filed paperwork to ensure Harris's inclusion on the Alabama ballot in November.

=== Voting laws ===
A study by the Center for Election Innovation & Research in July 2024 found that Alabama is one of only three remaining states (along with Mississippi and New Hampshire) to offer no early in-person voting option for the 2024 general election. The state also requires an eligible reason to vote by mail.

In August 2024, Alabama Secretary of State Wes Allen announced a process for purging 3,251 registered Alabama voters and referred them to the state attorney general’s office for criminal prosecution. In September 2024, the Department of Justice sued Alabama for violating the National Voter Registration Act. In October 2024, district judge Anna Manasco ruled in favor of the Department of Justice, ordering the state to restore the voter registrations. Alabama secretary of state’s chief of staff Clay Helms testified that 2,000 of the purged voters were legally registered citizens.

=== Predictions ===
Source	Ranking	As of
Cook Political Report	Solid R	December 19, 2023
Inside Elections	Solid R	April 26, 2023
Sabato's Crystal Ball	Safe R	June 29, 2023
Decision Desk HQ/The Hill	Safe R	December 14, 2023
CNalysis	Solid R	December 30, 2023
CNN	Solid R	January 14, 2024
The Economist	Safe R	June 12, 2024
538	Solid R	June 11, 2024
RCP	Solid R	June 26, 2024
NBC News	Safe R	October 6, 2024

=== Polling ===
Hypothetical polling with Donald Trump and Joe Biden

Donald Trump vs. Joe Biden

Poll source	Date(s) administered	Sample size (Note: Key: A – all adults RV – registered voters LV – likely voters V – unclear)	Margin of error	Donald Trump Republican	Joe Biden Democratic	Other / Undecided
	July 21, 2024	Joe Biden withdraws from the race.				
John Zogby Strategies (Note: Poll conducted for Kennedy's campaign)	April 13–21, 2024	513 (LV)	–	60%	32%	8%
Mainstreet Research/Florida Atlantic University	February 29 – March 3, 2024	191 (RV)	–	56%	37%	7% (Note: "Another candidate" with 5%)
Mainstreet Research/Florida Atlantic University	February 29 – March 3, 2024	179 (LV)	–	57%	38%	5% (Note: "Another candidate" with 4%)
WPA Intelligence (R)	August 23–24 & 26, 2023	500 (RV)	± 4.4%	57%	32%	12%

Hypothetical polling with other candidates

Donald Trump vs. Robert F. Kennedy Jr.

Poll source	Date(s) administered	Sample size	Margin of error	Donald Trump Republican	Robert Kennedy Jr. Independent	Other / Undecided
John Zogby Strategies	April 13–21, 2024	513 (LV)	–	56%	31%	13%

Robert F. Kennedy Jr. vs. Joe Biden

Poll source	Date(s) administered	Sample size	Margin of error	Robert Kennedy Jr. Independent	Joe Biden Democratic	Other / Undecided
John Zogby Strategies	April 13–21, 2024	513 (LV)	–	56%	30%	14%

=== Early voting ===
A study by the Center for Election Innovation & Research in July 2024 found that Alabama is one of only three remaining states (along with Mississippi and New Hampshire) to offer no early in-person voting option for the 2024 general election. The state also requires an eligible reason to vote by mail.

=== Results ===
State House district results: Trump 50–60% 60–70% 70–80% 80–90% 90–100% / Harris 40–50% 50–60% 60–70% 70–80% 80–90% Tie 40–50%

2024 United States presidential election in Alabama
Party	Candidate	Votes	%	±%
Republican	Donald Trump; JD Vance	1,462,616	64.57%	+2.54%
Democratic	Kamala Harris; Tim Walz	772,412	34.10%	−2.47%
Independent	Robert F. Kennedy Jr. (withdrawn); Nicole Shanahan (withdrawn)	12,075	0.53%	N/A
Independent (Note: Oliver and ter Maat were nominated by the Libertarian Party of Alabama but placed on the ballot as independents because the party did not have ballot access.)	Chase Oliver; Mike ter Maat	4,930	0.22%	−0.86%
Green	Jill Stein; Samson Kpadenou (Note: Replacement for Butch Ware, Stein's vice presidential nominee.)	4,319	0.19%	N/A
Write-in		8,738	0.39%	+0.08%
Total votes		2,265,090	100.00%	N/A

==== By county ====
County	Donald Trump Republican		Kamala Harris Democratic		Various candidates Other parties		Margin		Total
County	#	%	#	%	#	%	#	%	Total
Autauga	20,484	72.43%	7,439	26.30%	358	1.27%	13,045	46.13%	28,281
Baldwin	95,798	78.36%	24,934	20.40%	1,517	1.24%	70,864	57.97%	122,249
Barbour	5,606	56.88%	4,158	42.19%	91	0.92%	1,448	14.69%	9,855
Bibb	7,572	81.80%	1,619	17.49%	66	0.71%	5,953	64.31%	9,257
Blount	25,354	90.03%	2,576	9.15%	233	0.83%	22,778	80.88%	28,163
Bullock	1,101	26.78%	2,983	72.56%	27	0.66%	-1,882	-45.78%	4,111
Butler	5,172	60.99%	3,251	38.34%	57	0.67%	1,921	22.65%	8,480
Calhoun	34,912	71.76%	13,194	27.12%	547	1.12%	21,718	44.64%	48,653
Chambers	8,711	61.15%	5,405	37.94%	129	0.91%	3,306	23.21%	14,245
Cherokee	11,358	87.33%	1,553	11.94%	95	0.73%	9,805	75.39%	13,006
Chilton	16,920	85.61%	2,698	13.65%	145	0.73%	14,222	71.96%	19,763
Choctaw	4,103	61.64%	2,515	37.79%	38	0.57%	1,588	23.86%	6,656
Clarke	6,965	58.25%	4,927	41.20%	66	0.55%	2,038	17.04%	11,958
Clay	5,734	84.73%	993	14.67%	40	0.59%	4,741	70.06%	6,767
Cleburne	6,988	91.33%	605	7.91%	58	0.76%	6,383	83.43%	7,651
Coffee	17,495	78.39%	4,601	20.61%	223	1.00%	12,894	57.77%	22,319
Colbert	19,714	72.58%	7,137	26.28%	309	1.14%	12,577	46.31%	27,160
Conecuh	3,423	56.57%	2,580	42.64%	48	0.79%	843	13.93%	6,051
Coosa	3,758	71.34%	1,478	28.06%	32	0.61%	2,280	43.28%	5,268
Covington	14,677	85.86%	2,314	13.54%	104	0.61%	12,363	72.32%	17,095
Crenshaw	5,000	77.09%	1,457	22.46%	29	0.45%	3,543	54.63%	6,486
Cullman	38,704	89.70%	4,039	9.36%	403	0.93%	34,665	80.34%	43,146
Dale	14,476	75.64%	4,484	23.43%	179	0.94%	9,992	52.21%	19,139
Dallas	5,190	33.38%	10,236	65.84%	121	0.78%	-5,046	-32.46%	15,547
DeKalb	25,633	86.42%	3,758	12.67%	269	0.91%	21,875	73.75%	29,660
Elmore	31,374	75.37%	9,774	23.48%	476	1.14%	21,600	51.89%	41,624
Escambia	10,884	72.77%	3,964	26.50%	109	0.73%	6,920	46.27%	14,957
Etowah	35,653	77.28%	10,027	21.73%	457	0.99%	25,626	55.54%	46,137
Fayette	7,158	85.53%	1,142	13.65%	69	0.82%	6,016	71.88%	8,369
Franklin	10,417	86.11%	1,568	12.96%	112	0.93%	8,849	73.15%	12,097
Geneva	10,929	88.13%	1,391	11.22%	81	0.65%	9,538	76.91%	12,401
Greene	885	21.91%	3,133	77.57%	21	0.52%	-2,248	-55.66%	4,039
Hale	3,369	46.12%	3,868	52.95%	68	0.93%	-499	-6.83%	7,305
Henry	6,989	74.99%	2,263	24.28%	68	0.73%	4,726	50.71%	9,320
Houston	32,469	73.21%	11,352	25.60%	528	1.19%	21,117	47.62%	44,349
Jackson	20,073	85.21%	3,276	13.91%	207	0.88%	16,797	71.31%	23,556
Jefferson	131,123	43.90%	162,112	54.27%	5,469	1.83%	-30,989	-10.37%	298,704
Lamar	6,033	87.56%	806	11.70%	51	0.74%	5,227	75.86%	6,890
Lauderdale	32,708	74.95%	10,326	23.66%	603	1.38%	22,382	51.29%	43,637
Lawrence	13,024	80.78%	2,983	18.50%	115	0.71%	10,041	62.28%	16,122
Lee	46,020	62.93%	25,798	35.28%	1,309	1.79%	20,222	27.65%	73,127
Limestone	37,887	71.04%	14,581	27.34%	864	1.62%	23,306	43.70%	53,332
Lowndes	1,758	31.09%	3,867	68.38%	30	0.53%	-2,109	-37.29%	5,655
Macon	1,682	21.47%	6,084	77.66%	68	0.87%	-4,402	-56.19%	7,834
Madison	105,430	53.35%	87,824	44.44%	4,363	2.21%	17,606	8.91%	197,617
Marengo	4,995	51.59%	4,631	47.83%	56	0.58%	364	3.76%	9,682
Marion	12,245	90.42%	1,197	8.84%	101	0.75%	11,048	81.58%	13,543
Marshall	34,434	85.26%	5,553	13.75%	401	0.99%	28,881	71.51%	40,388
Mobile	100,759	57.52%	72,055	41.14%	2,350	1.34%	28,704	16.39%	175,164
Monroe	6,007	61.20%	3,740	38.10%	68	0.69%	2,267	23.10%	9,815
Montgomery	30,477	33.94%	57,946	64.53%	1,375	1.53%	-27,469	-30.59%	89,798
Morgan	40,449	75.54%	12,392	23.14%	702	1.31%	28,057	52.40%	53,543
Perry	1,269	28.42%	3,174	71.09%	22	0.49%	-1,905	-42.67%	4,465
Pickens	5,465	61.32%	3,388	38.02%	59	0.66%	2,077	23.31%	8,912
Pike	8,224	62.14%	4,899	37.02%	111	0.84%	3,325	25.12%	13,234
Randolph	9,102	82.07%	1,920	17.31%	69	0.62%	7,182	64.76%	11,091
Russell	10,078	48.64%	10,422	50.30%	218	1.05%	-344	-1.66%	20,718
Shelby	79,666	69.46%	33,087	28.85%	1,945	1.70%	46,579	40.61%	114,698
St. Clair	35,501	81.56%	7,640	17.55%	385	0.88%	27,861	64.01%	43,526
Sumter	1,542	29.06%	3,725	70.19%	40	0.75%	-2,183	-41.13%	5,307
Talladega	22,100	66.47%	10,898	32.78%	252	0.76%	11,202	33.69%	33,250
Tallapoosa	14,884	74.33%	4,975	24.85%	164	0.82%	9,909	49.49%	20,023
Tuscaloosa	50,724	59.50%	33,399	39.17%	1,133	1.33%	17,325	20.32%	85,256
Walker	25,464	85.49%	4,102	13.77%	220	0.74%	21,362	71.72%	29,786
Washington	6,534	77.41%	1,863	22.07%	44	0.52%	4,671	55.34%	8,441
Wilcox	1,793	34.07%	3,449	65.53%	21	0.40%	-1,656	-31.46%	5,263
Winston	10,191	91.41%	884	7.93%	74	0.66%	9,307	83.48%	11,149
Totals	1,462,616	64.57%	772,412	34.10%	30,062	1.33%	690,204	30.47%	2,265,090

==== County that flipped from Democratic to Republican ====
- Marengo (largest city: Demopolis)

==== By congressional district ====
Trump won five of seven congressional districts.

District	Trump	Harris	Representative
1st	76.96%	21.97%	Jerry Carl (118th Congress)
1st	76.96%	21.97%	Barry Moore (119th Congress)
2nd	45.32%	53.39%	Barry Moore (118th Congress)
2nd	45.32%	53.39%	Shomari Figures (119th Congress)
3rd	72.21%	26.19%	Mike Rogers
4th	82.65%	16.34%	Robert Aderholt
5th	63.59%	34.61%	Dale Strong
6th	68.64%	29.70%	Gary Palmer
7th	37.37%	61.34%	Terri Sewell

== Analysis ==
A Deep Southern state in the Bible Belt, Alabama is one of the most socially conservative states in the nation and is considered to be deeply red, not having voted for a Democratic presidential candidate since it supported Jimmy Carter of neighboring Georgia in 1976. Since then, the state has been competitive at this level in three elections: 1980 (when Carter narrowly lost Alabama while decisively losing re-election nationwide); 1992, and 1996 (when Southerner Bill Clinton lost the state by just under 7 points in both of his victories). In addition, Republicans hold supermajorities in both chambers of the state legislature, and the only Democrat to win a statewide election in Alabama since 2008 is former U.S. Senator Doug Jones, who narrowly won a 2017 special election but was commandingly defeated in 2020.

Donald Trump was able to increase his support and gain ground in every county. He narrowly flipped majority-Black Marengo County into the Republican column for the first time in a presidential race since George W. Bush did so by a similar margin in 2004. Kamala Harris only narrowly held onto Huntsville's urban core by 3.4%, a decline from Biden's 6% margin four years earlier. Though she kept her margin of defeat in the encompassing Madison County within the single digits, it was still a slight drop from Biden's.

== See also ==
- United States presidential elections in Alabama
- 2024 United States presidential election
- 2024 Democratic Party presidential primaries
- 2024 Republican Party presidential primaries
- 2024 United States elections

== Notes ==
Partisan clients
