= Northeast Mississippi Community College =

Public college in Booneville, Mississippi, US

Coordinates: 34°40′3″N 88°33′45″W

- Former names: Northeast Mississippi Junior College (1948-1987)
- Motto: Big Decision...Smart Choice
- Type: Public community college
- Established: 1948
- Academic affiliations: Space-grant
- President: Ricky G. Ford
- Students: 3,600+ (2010)
- Location: Booneville, Mississippi, United States
- Campus: Urban, Commuter
- Colors: Black, Gold
- Nickname: Tigers
- Website: www.nemcc.edu

Northeast Mississippi Community College (NEMCC) is a public community college in Booneville, Mississippi.

== History ==
The college was founded in 1948 as Northeast Mississippi Junior College, and became known primarily as an agricultural school and junior college. The land that the college sits on was sold to the state by Dr. W. H. Sutherland, with the express desire that a college be built in Booneville. The agricultural high school status was dropped a year later. The name of the school changed again to its current form in 1987. It has extension centers located in New Albany, Ripley and Corinth. Northeast Mississippi Community College's service area is made up of five counties: Alcorn, Prentiss, Tippah, Tishomingo, and Union.

== Governance ==
Northeast Mississippi Community is governed locally by a board of trustees which is made up of fifteen members–six members from Prentiss County and two each from Alcorn, Tippah, Tishomingo, and Union counties with one member elected at-large by the Board itself. The member-at-large position is rotated among those four counties.

One representative from each county is the County Superintendent of Education unless, he/she chooses not to serve. All members of the Board except the Superintendents and the member-at-large are appointed for five-year terms by their respective county’s board of supervisors. Terms are staggered to prevent the retirement of more than one member per county in any one year.

== Academics ==
Northeast is a comprehensive community college with transfer, career, and technical courses in day, evening, weekend, and on-line formats. The college supports students with a full array of financial aid, counseling, placement, and housing services. Mississippi State University and the University of Mississippi offer upper-division classes on the Booneville campus. Classes may also be taken at both the Corinth and New Albany sites.

Northeast is accredited by the Southern Association of Colleges and Schools-Commission on Colleges to award the Associate of Arts and Associate of Applied Science degrees along with professional career certificates. Many of the programs offered by the College are individually accredited by agencies with specific program expertise.

== Dormitories ==
Students staying in residence are housed in one of five dorms located around campus. With the exception of Mississippi Hall, these buildings are named in honor of former prominent leaders of the college.

- Mississippi Hall - This three-story facility was completed in 1990. Expansion and renovation in 2003 brings total capacity to 222 female students.
- Murphy Hall - This three-story facility provides accommodations for 168 female students. It is named in honor of a former member of the board of trustees, Nelwyn M. Murphy.
- White Hall - This three-story facility provides accommodations for 204 male students and is named in honor of the late Harold T. White, President of the College from 1965-1987.
- Wood Hall - This three-story facility provides 28 units for men and 30 units for women for a total of 116 students. It is named in honor of a former member of the board of trustees, Hoyt B. Wood.
- Yarber Hall - This three-story facility provides 58 units designed to house 116 male students. The residence hall is named in honor of a former member of the board of trustees, Bob Yarber.

== Notable alumni ==
- Mario Addison, NFL player
- Deion Belue, former CFL player
- Chris Bradwell (born 1983), former CFL player
- Shaq Buchanan (born 1997), basketball player in the Israeli Basketball Premier League
- Lester Carpenter, member of the Mississippi House of Representatives representing the First District of Mississippi.
- Travis Childers, former representative of Mississippi's First Congressional District.
- Robert Cobb, former NFL player
- Trey Johnson, NBA D-League player with the Los Angeles Lakers.
- Dontae' Jones, former NBA forward.
- Stephanie McAfee, author of Diary of a Mad Fat Girl, a New York Times e-book fiction bestseller.
- Billy McCoy, speaker of the Mississippi House of Representatives.
- Daniel Ross, NFL player
- Adrian Smith, 1966 NBA All-Star Game MVP.
- Michael Williams, former NFL player
- Jerome Woods, former NFL defensive back and Pro Bowl player.
- Qyntel Woods, former NBA shooting guard/forward currently playing for AZS Koszalin in Poland.
- Sam Williams, NFL player
