= Escambia County, Alabama =

County in Alabama, United States

- County
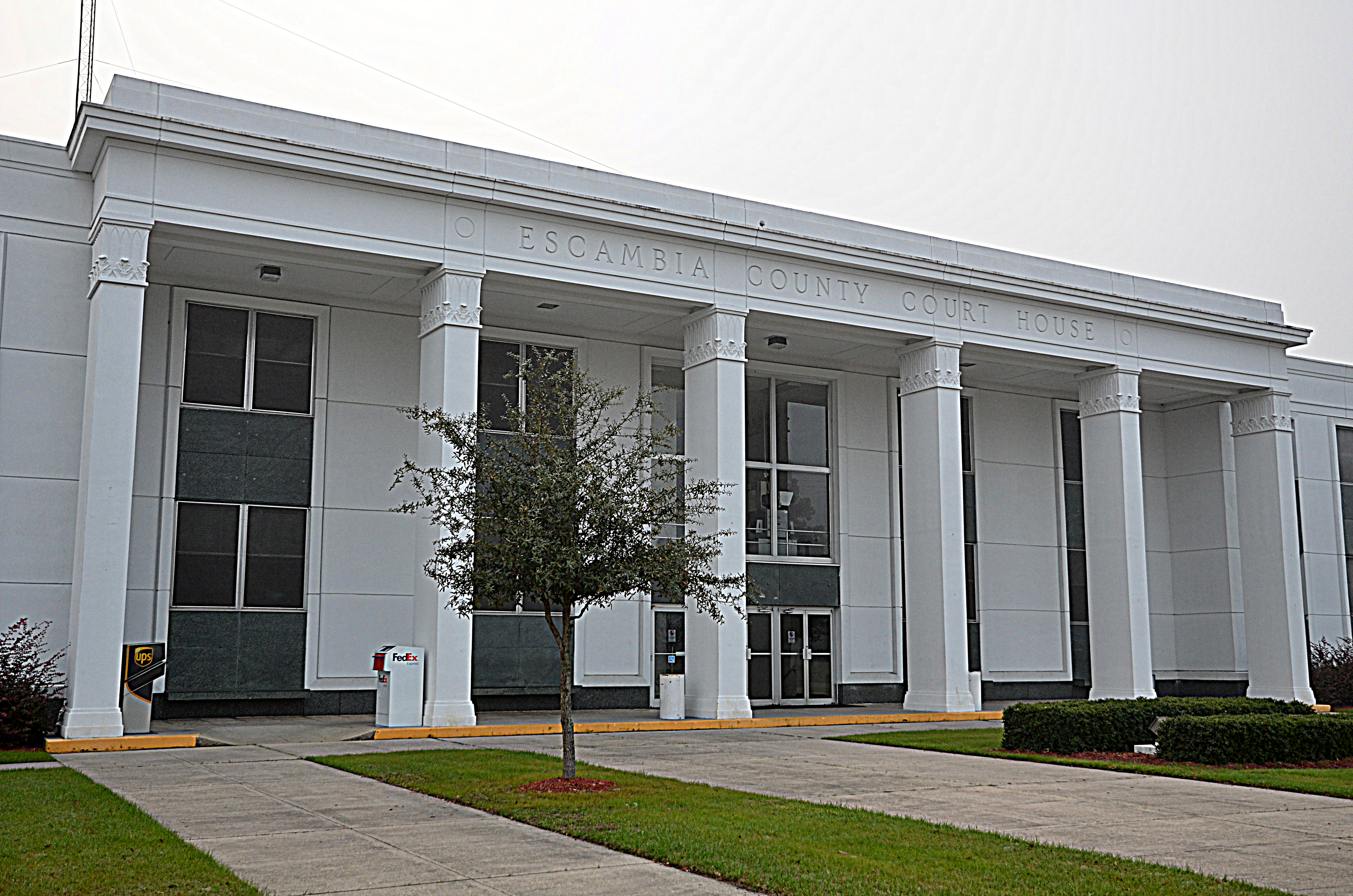
- Escambia County, Alabama Courthouse

- Seal

- Location within the U.S. state of Alabama
- Coordinates: 31°07′36″N 87°09′44″W
- Country: United States
- State: Alabama
- Founded: December 10, 1868
- Seat: Brewton
- Largest city: Atmore

Area
  - Total: 953 sq mi (2,470 km^{2})
  - Land: 945 sq mi (2,450 km^{2})
  - Water: 8.1 sq mi (21 km^{2}) 0.8%

Population (2020)
  - Total: 36,757
  - Estimate (2025): 36,665 ▼
  - Density: 38.9/sq mi (15.0/km^{2})
- Time zone: UTC−6 (Central)
  - Summer (DST): UTC−5 (CDT)
- Congressional district: 1st
- Website: www.escambiacountyal.gov
- County Number 30 on Alabama license plates

Escambia County is a county located in the south central portion of the U.S. state of Alabama. As of the 2020 census, the population was 36,757. Its county seat is Brewton.

Escambia County is coextensive with the Atmore, AL Micropolitan Statistical Area; which is itself a constituent part of the larger Pensacola-Ferry Pass, FL-AL Combined Statistical Area.

The county is the base of the state's only federally recognized Native American tribe, the Poarch Band of Creek Indians. They have developed gaming casinos and a hotel on their reservation here, but also a much larger business extending to locations in other states and the Caribbean.

== Etymology ==
The name "Escambia" may have been derived from the Creek name Shambia, meaning "clearwater", or the Choctaw word for "cane-brake" or "reed-brake".

== History ==
Historic American Indian tribes in the area included the Muskogean-speaking Creek, Choctaw, and Alabama, who had inhabited the lands for centuries and had many settlements. The former two tribes were among those in the Southeast whom the European-American settlers called the Five Civilized Tribes, as they adopted some European-American cultural ways. Many of their members had close working relationships with traders and settlers moving into the area in the early 19th century. Following the 1814 Treaty of Fort Jackson, several Creek families, including the Colberts, Gibsons, Manacs and Weatherfords, secured small reservations from federal government in the vicinity of present-day Poarch. Members of these families had remained friendly towards the United States during the Creek wars of 1813 and 1814. In 1836, the federal government permitted several additional Creek families to secured reservations.

Escambia County was organized and established after the American Civil War, on December 10, 1868, during the Reconstruction era. The state legislature created it from parts of Baldwin and Conecuh counties, to the west and north, respectively. The area was part of the coastal plain. It was largely agricultural into the 20th century.

The county is subject to heavy winds and rains due to seasonal hurricanes. In September 1979, the county was declared a disaster area due to damage from Hurricane Frederic. It was declared a disaster area again in September 2004 due to damage from Hurricane Ivan.

In the 20th century, the Poarch Band of Creek Indians organized to gain recognition as a tribe, and established a government under a written constitution. The federal government recognized the Boarch Band on August 11, 1984. It had control of some lands that were taken into trust on their behalf by the federal government as part of the federal recognition process. It is the only federally recognized tribe in the state. Since the late 20th century, they have developed three gaming resorts to generate revenues for tribal health and welfare.

In addition, Alabama has recognized nine tribes, generally descendants of Choctaw, Creek, and Cherokee Native Americans who had historically lived here.

== Geography ==
According to the United States Census Bureau, the county has a total area of 953 square miles (2,470 km^{2}), of which 945 square miles (2,450 km^{2}) is land and 8.1 square miles (21 km^{2}) (0.8%) is water.

=== Major highways ===
- Interstate 65
- U.S. Highway 29 / State Route 15 (unsigned)
- U.S. Highway 31 / State Route 3 (unsigned)
- State Route 21
- State Route 41
- State Route 113

=== Adjacent counties ===
- Conecuh County (north)
- Covington County (east)
- Okaloosa County, Florida (southeast)
- Santa Rosa County, Florida (south)
- Escambia County, Florida (southwest)
- Baldwin County (west)
- Monroe County (northwest)

Escambia County in Alabama and Escambia County in Florida are two of 22 counties or parishes in the United States with the same name to border each other across state lines.

=== National protected area ===
- Conecuh National Forest (part)

== Demographics ==
Historical population
Census	Pop.	Note	%±
1870	4,041		—
1880	5,719		41.5%
1890	8,666		51.5%
1900	11,320		30.6%
1910	18,889		66.9%
1920	22,464		18.9%
1930	27,963		24.5%
1940	30,671		9.7%
1950	31,443		2.5%
1960	33,511		6.6%
1970	34,912		4.2%
1980	38,440		10.1%
1990	35,518		−7.6%
2000	38,440		8.2%
2010	38,319		−0.3%
2020	36,757		−4.1%
2025 (est.)	36,665	▼	−0.3%
U.S. Decennial Census; 1790–1960 1900–1990; 1990–2000 2010–2020

=== 2020 census ===
As of the 2020 census, the county had a population of 36,757. The median age was 41.8 years. 22.3% of residents were under the age of 18 and 19.4% of residents were 65 years of age or older. For every 100 females there were 98.7 males, and for every 100 females age 18 and over there were 98.0 males age 18 and over.

The racial makeup of the county was 60.4% White, 29.9% Black or African American, 4.2% American Indian and Alaska Native, 0.3% Asian, 0.1% Native Hawaiian and Pacific Islander, 0.8% from some other race, and 4.4% from two or more races. Hispanic or Latino residents of any race comprised 2.0% of the population.

34.7% of residents lived in urban areas, while 65.3% lived in rural areas.

There were 14,499 households in the county, of which 30.3% had children under the age of 18 living with them and 34.5% had a female householder with no spouse or partner present. About 31.6% of all households were made up of individuals and 14.8% had someone living alone who was 65 years of age or older.

There were 16,684 housing units, of which 13.1% were vacant. Among occupied housing units, 69.7% were owner-occupied and 30.3% were renter-occupied. The homeowner vacancy rate was 1.9% and the rental vacancy rate was 7.4%.

=== Racial and ethnic composition ===
Escambia County, Alabama – Racial and ethnic composition Note: the US Census treats Hispanic/Latino as an ethnic category. This table excludes Latinos from the racial categories and assigns them to a separate category. Hispanics/Latinos may be of any race.
Race / Ethnicity (NH = Non-Hispanic)	Pop 2000	Pop 2010	Pop 2020	% 2000	% 2010	% 2020
White alone (NH)	24,575	23,508	22,004	63.93%	61.35%	59.86%
Black or African American alone (NH)	11,799	12,162	10,922	30.69%	31.74%	29.71%
Native American or Alaska Native alone (NH)	1,153	1,274	1,488	3.00%	3.32%	4.05%
Asian alone (NH)	93	86	108	0.24%	0.22%	0.29%
Pacific Islander alone (NH)	10	12	22	0.03%	0.03%	0.06%
Other race alone (NH)	25	20	49	0.07%	0.05%	0.13%
Mixed race or Multiracial (NH)	406	539	1,413	1.06%	1.41%	3.84%
Hispanic or Latino (any race)	379	718	751	0.99%	1.87%	2.04%
Total	38,440	38,319	36,757	100.00%	100.00%	100.00%

=== 2010 census ===
According to the 2010 United States census:

- 62.1% White
- 31.9% Black
- 4.4% Native American
- 0.2% Asian
- 0.0% Native Hawaiian or Pacific Islander
- 1.5% Two or more races
- 1.9% Hispanic or Latino (of any race)

As of 2012 the largest self-reported ancestry groups in Escambia County were:

- 30.5% English
- 12.1% "American"
- 9.9% Irish

=== 2000 census ===
As of the census of 2000, there were 38,440 people, 14,297 households, and 10,093 families residing in the county. The population density was 41 people per square mile (16 people/km^{2}). There were 16,544 housing units at an average density of 18 units per square mile (6.9 units/km^{2}). The racial makeup of the county was 64.40% White, 30.79% Black or African American, 3.01% Native American, 0.24% Asian, 0.03% Pacific Islander, 0.40% from other races, and 1.13% from two or more races. 0.99% of the population were Hispanic or Latino of any race.

There were 14,297 households, out of which 32.00% had children under the age of 18 living with them, 51.70% were married couples living together, 15.10% had a female householder with no husband present, and 29.40% were non-families. 26.40% of all households were made up of individuals, and 11.40% had someone living alone who was 65 years of age or older. The average household size was 2.48 and the average family size was 2.99.

In the county, the population was spread out, with 24.10% under the age of 18, 9.70% from 18 to 24, 28.90% from 25 to 44, 23.70% from 45 to 64, and 13.60% who were 65 years of age or older. The median age was 37 years. For every 100 females there were 102.70 males. For every 100 females age 18 and over, there were 102.70 males.

The median income for a household in the county was $28,319, and the median income for a family was $36,086. Males had a median income of $30,632 versus $18,091 for females. The per capita income for the county was $14,396. About 15.20% of families and 20.90% of the population were below the poverty line, including 24.70% of those under age 18 and 17.80% of those age 65 or over.

== Government and infrastructure ==
The Holman Correctional Facility of the Alabama Department of Corrections (ADOC) is in Atmore, 9 miles (14 km) north of the Atmore city center. Holman has a male death row and the State of Alabama execution chamber. In addition the ADOC Fountain Correctional Facility is also in Atmore, about 7 miles (11 km) north of the Atmore city center. The city of Atmore annexed both prisons in 2008.

Escambia County is reliably Republican at the presidential level. The last Democrat to win the county in a presidential election is Jimmy Carter, who won it by a majority in 1976.

United States presidential election results for Escambia County, Alabama
Year	Republican		Democratic		Third party(ies)	
Year	No.	%	No.	%	No.	%
1872	216	26.50%	599	73.50%	0	0.00%
1876	198	20.16%	784	79.84%	0	0.00%
1880	285	25.47%	812	72.56%	22	1.97%
1884	367	34.46%	682	64.04%	16	1.50%
1888	484	40.78%	694	58.47%	9	0.76%
1892	21	1.17%	1,110	62.05%	658	36.78%
1896	482	32.18%	914	61.01%	102	6.81%
1900	436	40.22%	609	56.18%	39	3.60%
1904	83	11.54%	627	87.20%	9	1.25%
1908	113	14.27%	641	80.93%	38	4.80%
1912	52	5.37%	829	85.64%	87	8.99%
1916	108	9.88%	982	89.84%	3	0.27%
1920	178	10.87%	1,455	88.88%	4	0.24%
1924	152	10.70%	1,217	85.70%	51	3.59%
1928	1,754	61.94%	1,077	38.03%	1	0.04%
1932	157	7.19%	2,024	92.67%	3	0.14%
1936	103	3.82%	2,585	95.81%	10	0.37%
1940	137	4.70%	2,772	95.03%	8	0.27%
1944	266	11.30%	2,077	88.20%	12	0.51%
1948	188	9.99%	0	0.00%	1,694	90.01%
1952	1,187	25.90%	3,385	73.86%	11	0.24%
1956	1,529	28.85%	3,437	64.86%	333	6.28%
1960	1,810	30.65%	3,990	67.57%	105	1.78%
1964	5,623	74.47%	0	0.00%	1,928	25.53%
1968	680	6.32%	1,492	13.86%	8,593	79.82%
1972	7,883	82.19%	1,598	16.66%	110	1.15%
1976	4,934	44.22%	5,957	53.39%	266	2.38%
1980	6,513	54.04%	5,148	42.71%	392	3.25%
1984	8,694	68.33%	3,853	30.28%	177	1.39%
1988	6,807	62.14%	4,020	36.70%	127	1.16%
1992	5,955	46.44%	4,809	37.50%	2,060	16.06%
1996	5,214	46.96%	4,651	41.89%	1,239	11.16%
2000	6,975	59.82%	4,523	38.79%	162	1.39%
2004	8,513	68.68%	3,814	30.77%	68	0.55%
2008	9,375	63.89%	5,188	35.36%	111	0.76%
2012	9,287	62.35%	5,489	36.85%	118	0.79%
2016	9,935	66.92%	4,605	31.02%	305	2.05%
2020	10,869	68.32%	4,918	30.91%	123	0.77%
2024	10,884	72.77%	3,964	26.50%	109	0.73%

United States Senate election results for Escambia County, Alabama2
Year	Republican		Democratic		Third party(ies)	
Year	No.	%	No.	%	No.	%
2020	10,417	65.80%	5,400	34.11%	14	0.09%

United States Senate election results for Escambia County, Alabama3
Year	Republican		Democratic		Third party(ies)	
Year	No.	%	No.	%	No.	%
2022	7,284	75.47%	2,247	23.28%	121	1.25%

Alabama Gubernatorial election results for Escambia County
Year	Republican		Democratic		Third party(ies)	
Year	No.	%	No.	%	No.	%
2022	7,286	75.25%	2,167	22.38%	229	2.37%

== Communities ==
=== Cities ===
- Atmore
- Brewton (county seat)
- East Brewton

=== Towns ===
- Flomaton
- Pollard
- Riverview

=== Unincorporated communities ===
- Canoe
- Dixonville
- Foshee
- Freemanville
- Huxford
- McCullough
- Nokomis
- Spring Hill
- Wahl

=== Former town ===
- Alco

=== Indian reservation ===
- Poarch Creek Indian Reservation

== Education ==
The two school districts are Brewton City Schools (City of Brewton) and Escambia County School System (all other locations).

== Historic sites ==
Escambia County has three sites listed on the National Register of Historic Places, the Atmore Commercial Historic District the Brewton Historic Commercial District, and the Commercial Hotel-Hart Hotel.

== Notable residents ==
- Esther Blake (1897–1979), the first woman in the United States Air Force.

== See also ==
- National Register of Historic Places listings in Escambia County, Alabama
- Properties on the Alabama Register of Landmarks and Heritage in Escambia County, Alabama
