= McCullough, Alabama =

Unincorporated community in Alabama, United States

- Unincorporated community
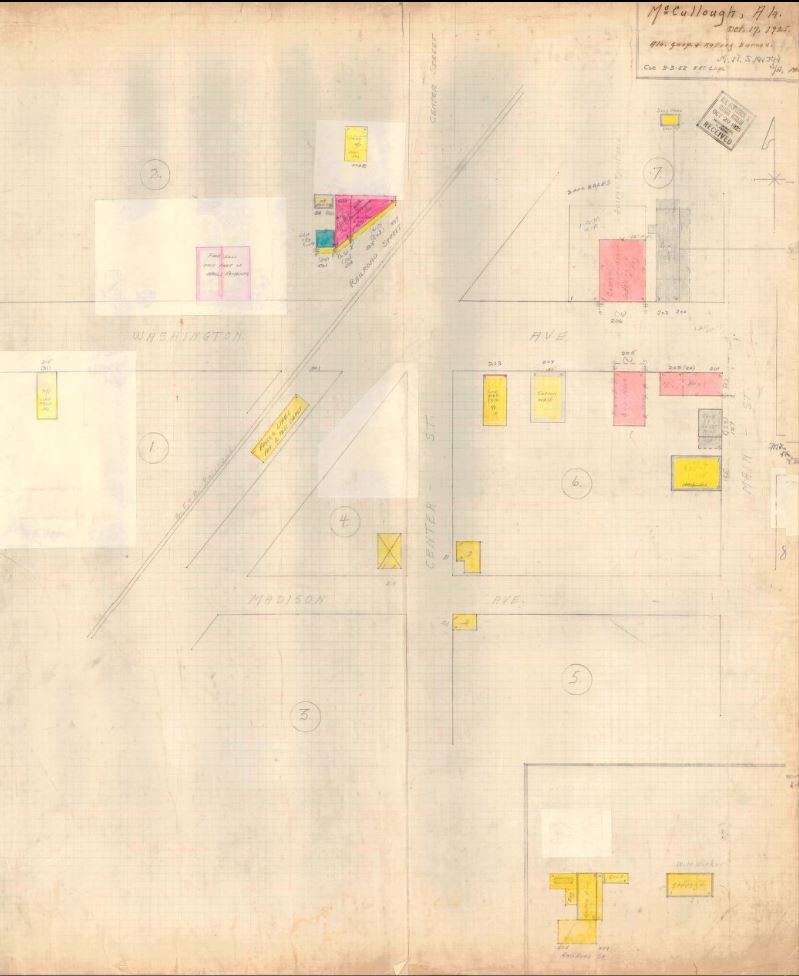
- 1925 fire insurance map of McCullough

- Location within Alabama Location within the United States
- Coordinates: 31°10′01″N 87°31′35″W
- Country: United States
- State: Alabama
- County: Escambia
- Elevation: 299 ft (91 m)
- Time zone: UTC-6 (Central (CST))
  - Summer (DST): UTC-5 (CDT)
- Area code: 251
- GNIS feature ID: 122509

McCullough is an unincorporated community in Escambia County, Alabama, United States.

== History ==
McCullough was named for Warren Hill McCullough, who settled in the area in the 1890s. McCullough was on the Muscle Shoals, Birmingham & Pensacola Railway. At one time, McCullough was home to a cotton gin, several saw mills, a school, drug store, and multiple general stores.

A post office operated under the name McCullough from 1914 to 1989.
