= Carl Madison =

American football player and coach (1931–2024)

Carl Madison (1931 – March 3, 2024) was an American football coach. He spent over 45 years coaching high school football at numerous schools in Florida and Alabama, compiling a 326–129–7 record which makes him number two on Florida’s all-time coaching victories list (behind Corky Rogers).

== Life and career ==
Born in Uriah, Alabama, Madison attended Escambia County High School, graduating in 1949. He enrolled at Texas Tech University on an athletic scholarship, but left after his freshman year to join the United States Army. He returned to Texas Tech in 1952, starting four games in the 1952 college football season before an injury cut short his career. He transferred to Troy State Teachers College (now Troy University), where he graduated in 1955.

Upon graduation, he took on his first coaching job at Carrabelle High School. He spent the next couple of years at a number of schools, including Milton High School, where he won his first state championship.

Madison coached J. M. Tate High School in Gonzalez, Florida, to a state championship in 1980, and took Pensacola's Pine Forest High School to two state championships in 1987 and 1988. The 1988 Eagle team was named as mythical national champions by USA Today, and Madison earned the title of the High School Coach of the Year.

Coach Madison left the Pensacola area for a brief return to coaching in south Georgia at Westover High School in 1989-90 to help turn around a struggling program. He returned to Milton High School as the head coach for several years in the late 1990s. (Need to firm up these years. I know he was there in 1994-1999. I believe he coached Long enough to retire from FL, then returned to AL to complete a retirement in AL too.)

Madison's last stint as a head coach was when he returned to the sidelines in 2002 and took over the Jackson Academy Program in Jackson, Alabama. JA was coming off a 0–10 season, and in Madison's first year with the program he led them to a 10–3 record which included a state title. In 2003, Madison again led JA to a state title and a 12–0 record. Madison coached one more season with JA before retiring after the 2004 season. Madison briefly came out of retirement in 2009 to assist his former school, Tate High School, as an offensive consultant at the age of 77.

The Tate High School football field was renamed as “Carl Madison Field” in his honor in 2021 and officially dedicated in 2022.

Madison died on March 3, 2024, at the age of 93.
