= Ed Morris (1920s pitcher) =

American baseball player (1899–1932)

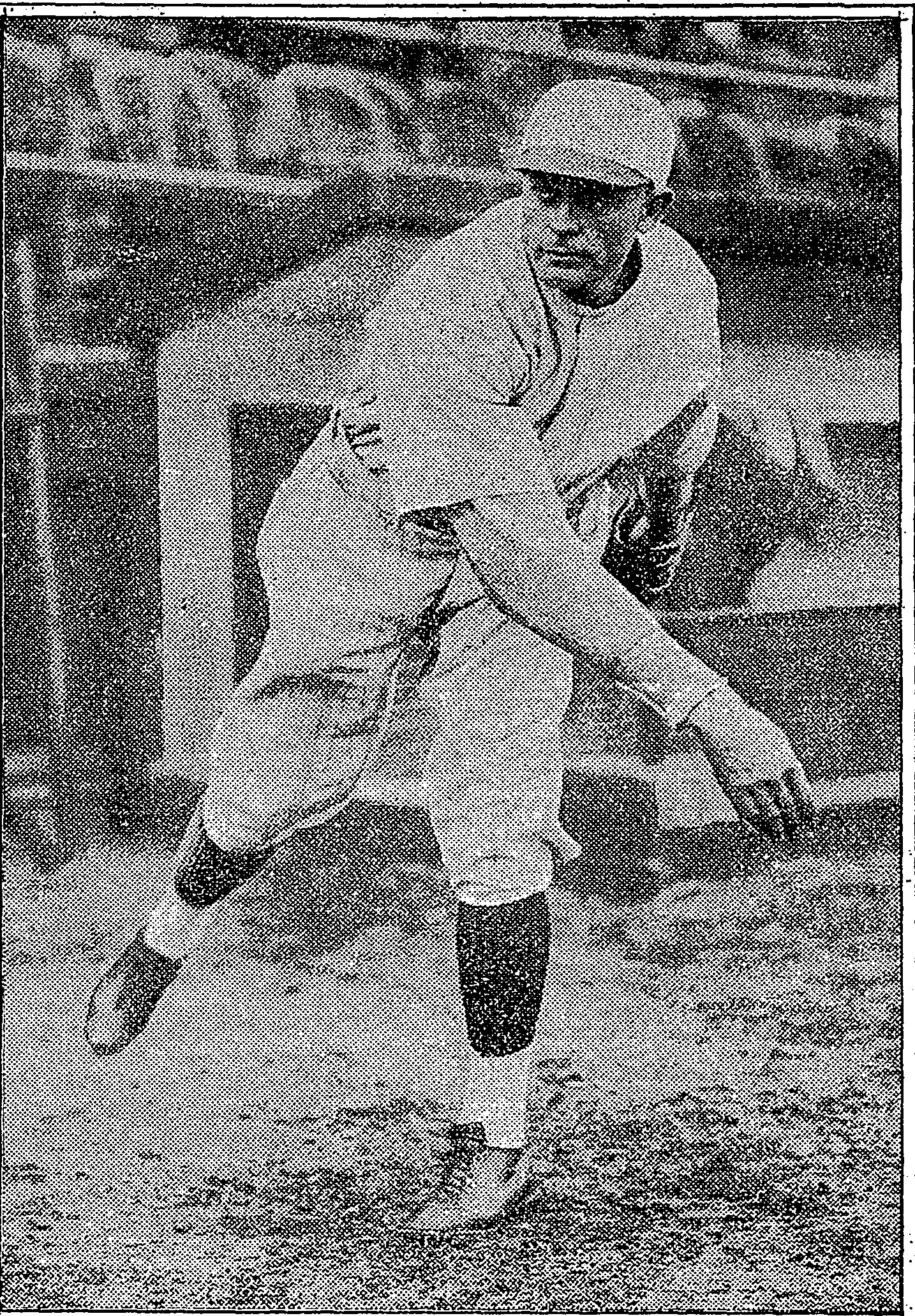
- Pitcher
- Born: December 7, 1899; Foshee, Alabama, U.S.
- Died: March 2, 1932 (aged 32); Century, Florida, U.S.
- Batted: Right Threw: Right

MLB debut
- August 5, 1922, for the Chicago Cubs

Last MLB appearance
- September 21, 1931, for the Boston Red Sox

MLB statistics
- Win–loss record: 42–45
- Earned run average: 4.19
- Strikeouts: 256
- Stats at Baseball Reference

Teams
- Chicago Cubs (1922); Boston Red Sox (1928–1931)

Walter Edward "Big Ed" Morris (December 7, 1899 – March 3, 1932) was an American professional baseball player who died after being stabbed in an altercation at a party. He was a starting pitcher in Major League who played in five seasons from 1922 to 1931. Listed at 6 ft 2 in (1.88 m), 185 lb., he batted and threw right-handed.

== Early career ==
A native of Foshee, Alabama, Morris entered the majors in August 1922 with the Chicago Cubs, appearing for them in 12 innings of relief and did not have a decision. While pitching in the minors for Montgomery, he threw a no-hitter against Hershey. Morris returned to the major leagues in 1928, this time with the Boston Red Sox.

== Later career ==
In 1928, Morris posted a 19–15 record with a 3.53 ERA and 104 strikeouts in 257 2/3 innings for the last-place Red Sox, being considered in the American League MVP vote. In 1929, he went 14-14 with a 4.45 ERA. After that, he went 4-9 in 1930 and 5-7 in 1931.

In a five-year career, Morris posted a 42–45 record with 256 strikeouts and a 4.19 ERA in 140 appearances, including 78 starts, 43 complete games, two shutouts, six saves, and 674.0 innings of work.

== Death ==
Prior to spring training before the 1932 season, some friends of Morris threw a going-away party for him at a cabin on the Escambia River. The party got out of hand, and Morris got into an altercation with another man. Another attendee, Joe White, tried to break up the fight, but Morris began assaulting him. During their fight, White stabbed Morris in the chest with a knife. Morris was taken to a hospital in Century, Florida, where he died three days later. White was charged second-degree murder, but was convicted of the lesser charge of manslaughter. He was sentenced to three years in prison, but was granted a new trial in 1933 and did not serve any time.

== See also ==
- List of baseball players who died during their careers
