= Foshee, Alabama =

Unincorporated community in Alabama, United States

- Unincorporated community
- Location within Alabama Location within the United States
- Coordinates: 31°07′01″N 87°13′35″W
- Country: United States
- State: Alabama
- County: Escambia
- Elevation: 118 ft (36 m)
- Time zone: UTC-6 (Central (CST))
  - Summer (DST): UTC-5 (CDT)
- Area code: 251
- GNIS feature ID: 156369

Foshee is an unincorporated community in Escambia County, Alabama, United States between Brewton and Pollard on U.S. Route 29. Foshee was founded as a sawmill town and named after Stewart J. Foshee, who owned several sawmills in Escambia County. Russell A. Alger and Martin Sullivan founded the Alger-Sullivan Lumber Company in the late 1890s and began logging around Foshee. They used lumber from the mill to build a new sawmill in Florida, which eventually grew into the town of Century. A post office was operated in Foshee from 1914 to 1924.

== Notable person ==
- Ed Morris, a Major League Baseball pitcher from 1922 to 1931.
