= Spring Hill, Escambia County, Alabama =

Unincorporated community in Alabama, United States

Spring Hill, Alabama
- Unincorporated community
- Location within Alabama Location within the United States
- Coordinates: 31°06′29″N 87°02′07″W
- Country: United States
- State: Alabama
- County: Escambia
- Elevation: 197 ft (60 m)
- Time zone: UTC-6 (Central (CST))
  - Summer (DST): UTC-5 (CDT)
- Area code: 251
- GNIS feature ID: 127235

Spring Hill is an unincorporated community in Escambia County, Alabama, United States. Spring Hill is located on County Route 22, 2.2 miles (3.5 km) east of Brewton.
