= Wahl, Alabama =

Unincorporated community in Alabama, United States

- Unincorporated community
- Location within Alabama Location within the United States
- Coordinates: 31°00′19″N 87°13′17″W
- Country: United States
- State: Alabama
- County: Escambia
- Elevation: 92 ft (28 m)
- Time zone: UTC-6 (Central (CST))
  - Summer (DST): UTC-5 (CDT)
- Area code: 251
- GNIS feature ID: 157206

Wahl is an unincorporated community in Escambia County, Alabama, United States.
