= Michael Williams (running back) =

American football player (born 1961)

No. 32, 42
- Position: Running back

Personal information
- Born: July 16, 1961 (age 65); Atmore, Alabama, U.S.
- Listed height: 6 ft 2 in (1.88 m)
- Listed weight: 220 lb (100 kg)

Career information
- High school: Escambia County (Atmore)
- College: Northeast Mississippi (1979–1980); Mississippi College (1981–1982)
- NFL draft: 1983: 4th round, 89th overall pick

Career history
- Philadelphia Eagles (1983–1984); Atlanta Falcons (1986)*; Atlanta Falcons (1987)
- * Offseason or practice squad member only

Career NFL statistics
- Rushing yards: 517
- Rushing average: 3.4
- Receptions: 33
- Receiving yards: 259
- Stats at Pro Football Reference

Michael Williams (born July 16, 1961) is an American former professional football player who was a running back for three seasons in the National Football League (NFL) with the Philadelphia Eagles and Atlanta Falcons. He was selected by the Eagles in the fourth round of the 1983 NFL draft. He first enrolled at Northeast Mississippi Community College before transferring to play college football for the Mississippi College Choctaws.

== Early life and college ==
Michael Williams was born on July 16, 1961, in Atmore, Alabama. He attended Escambia County High School in Atmore, Alabama.

Williams was a member of the college football team at Northeast Mississippi Community College from 1979 to 1980. He then transferred to Mississippi College and was a member of the Mississippi College Choctaws from 1981 to 1982.

== Professional career ==
Williams was selected by the Philadelphia Eagles in the fourth round, with the 89th overall pick, of the 1983 NFL draft. He officially signed with the team on May 26, 1983. He played in 15 games, starting nine, for the Eagles during his rookie year in 1983, rushing 103 times for 385 yards while also catching 17 passes for 142 yards. Williams appeared in all 16 games, starting one, during the 1984 season, recording 33 carries for 83 yards and seven receptions for 47 yards. He was released by the Eagles on August 20, 1985.

Williams signed with the Atlanta Falcons on April 3, 1986, before being released later that year. On September 23, 1987, he was re-signed by the Falcons during the 1987 NFL players strike. He played in three games, starting one, for the Falcons that season, rushing 14 times for 49 yards and catching nine passes for 70 yards. He was released on October 19, 1987, after the strike ended.
