= 1976 United States presidential election in Alabama =

- November 2, 1976

All 9 Alabama electoral votes to the Electoral College

Nominee	Jimmy Carter	Gerald Ford
Party	Democratic	Republican
Home state	Georgia	Michigan
Running mate	Walter Mondale	Bob Dole
Electoral vote	9	0
Popular vote	659,170	504,070
Percentage	55.73%	42.61%
County results
Carter
40–50%
50–60%
60–70%
70–80%
80–90%
Ford
50–60%
President before election
Gerald Ford
Republican
Elected President
Jimmy Carter
Democratic

The 1976 United States presidential election in Alabama took place on November 2, 1976, as part of the 1976 presidential election. Voters chose nine representatives, or electors, to the Electoral College, who voted for president and vice president.

Alabama voted for the Democratic nominee, former Governor Jimmy Carter, over the Republican nominee, President Gerald Ford. Carter won Alabama by a margin of 13.12%. As of the 2024 presidential election, this is the last time Alabama has voted Democratic in a presidential election, as well as the last time a Democrat carried any of the following counties: Madison, Tuscaloosa, Calhoun, St. Clair, Elmore, DeKalb, Blount, Autauga, Dale, Coffee, Chilton, Escambia, Covington, Pike, Geneva, Winston, Monroe, and Cleburne.

Among white voters, 50% supported Ford while 48% supported Carter.

== Results ==
1976 United States presidential election in Alabama
Party	Candidate	Votes	Percentage	Electoral votes
Democratic	Jimmy Carter	659,170	55.73%	9
Republican	Gerald Ford (inc.)	504,070	42.61%	0
AL Conservative	Lester Maddox	9,198	0.78%	0
Prohibition	Benjamin Bubar	6,669	0.56%	0
Independent	Gus Hall	1,954	0.17%	0
Libertarian	Roger MacBride	1,481	0.13%	0
Write-in	Various candidates	139 (Note: Although McCarthy and Anderson were separated from other write-in candidates, none of the write-in votes were separated by county; they were given only as a state-wide total.)	0.01%	0
Write-in	Eugene McCarthy	99	0.01%	0
Write-in	Thomas J. Anderson	70	0.01%	0

=== Result by county ===
County	Jimmy Carter Democratic		Gerald Ford Republican		Lester Maddox Alabama Conservative		Benjamin Bubar Prohibition		Various candidates Other parties		Margin		Total votes cast
County	#	%	#	%	#	%	#	%	#	%	#	%	Total votes cast
Autauga	4,640	49.69%	4,512	48.32%	87	0.93%	69	0.74%	30	0.32%	128	1.37%	9,338
Baldwin	9,191	40.02%	13,256	57.72%	184	0.80%	288	1.25%	48	0.21%	-4,065	-17.70%	22,967
Barbour	4,730	54.43%	3,758	43.25%	85	0.98%	98	1.13%	19	0.22%	972	11.18%	8,690
Bibb	2,850	63.70%	1,591	35.56%	33	0.74%	0	0.00%	0	0.00%	1,259	28.14%	4,474
Blount	6,645	60.53%	4,233	38.56%	62	0.56%	30	0.27%	8	0.07%	2,412	21.97%	10,978
Bullock	3,536	69.44%	1,482	29.10%	30	0.59%	36	0.71%	8	0.16%	2,054	40.34%	5,092
Butler	4,271	59.25%	2,909	40.36%	18	0.25%	2	0.03%	8	0.11%	1,362	18.89%	7,208
Calhoun	20,466	62.59%	11,763	35.97%	281	0.86%	27	0.08%	163	0.50%	8,703	26.62%	32,700
Chambers	6,164	52.03%	5,488	46.32%	108	0.91%	65	0.55%	23	0.19%	676	5.71%	11,848
Cherokee	4,668	74.62%	1,492	23.85%	47	0.75%	36	0.58%	13	0.21%	3,176	50.77%	6,256
Chilton	5,550	53.44%	4,725	45.50%	53	0.51%	7	0.07%	50	0.48%	825	7.94%	10,385
Choctaw	3,911	56.10%	3,033	43.50%	24	0.34%	3	0.04%	1	0.01%	878	12.60%	6,972
Clarke	4,737	52.60%	4,126	45.81%	71	0.79%	58	0.64%	14	0.16%	611	6.79%	9,006
Clay	2,946	60.64%	1,883	38.76%	17	0.35%	9	0.18%	20	0.41%	1,063	21.88%	4,858
Cleburne	2,490	62.55%	1,436	36.07%	39	0.97%	16	0.40%	39	0.97%	1,054	26.48%	3,981
Coffee	7,844	62.00%	4,683	37.02%	64	0.51%	42	0.33%	18	0.14%	3,161	24.98%	12,651
Colbert	11,996	71.23%	4,471	26.55%	167	0.99%	174	1.03%	34	0.20%	7,525	44.68%	16,842
Conecuh	3,086	61.97%	1,812	36.39%	32	0.64%	13	0.26%	37	0.74%	1,274	25.58%	4,980
Coosa	2,533	67.26%	1,196	31.76%	18	0.48%	14	0.37%	5	0.13%	1,337	35.50%	3,766
Covington	7,081	57.93%	4,977	40.71%	73	0.60%	9	0.07%	84	0.69%	2,104	17.22%	12,224
Crenshaw	3,372	64.03%	1,801	34.20%	69	1.31%	5	0.09%	19	0.36%	1,571	29.83%	5,266
Cullman	12,961	64.63%	6,899	34.40%	109	0.54%	26	0.13%	60	0.30%	6,062	30.23%	20,055
Dale	6,346	55.03%	4,996	43.33%	103	0.89%	69	0.60%	17	0.15%	1,350	11.70%	11,531
Dallas	8,866	54.19%	7,144	43.66%	161	0.98%	159	0.97%	31	0.19%	1,722	10.53%	16,361
DeKalb	9,759	59.37%	6,597	40.14%	30	0.18%	41	0.25%	10	0.06%	3,162	19.23%	16,437
Elmore	6,646	49.20%	6,551	48.50%	157	1.16%	121	0.90%	33	0.24%	95	0.70%	13,508
Escambia	5,957	53.39%	4,934	44.22%	58	0.52%	17	0.15%	191	1.71%	1,023	9.17%	11,157
Etowah	25,020	69.99%	10,333	28.90%	209	0.58%	47	0.13%	141	0.39%	14,687	41.09%	35,750
Fayette	4,076	64.83%	2,165	34.44%	20	0.32%	13	0.21%	13	0.21%	1,911	30.39%	6,287
Franklin	6,279	64.59%	3,345	34.41%	36	0.37%	51	0.52%	10	0.10%	2,934	30.18%	9,721
Geneva	5,983	68.46%	2,663	30.47%	51	0.58%	4	0.05%	38	0.43%	3,320	37.99%	8,739
Greene	2,900	75.96%	903	23.65%	7	0.18%	3	0.08%	5	0.13%	1,997	52.31%	3,818
Hale	3,236	59.99%	2,034	37.71%	61	1.13%	44	0.82%	19	0.35%	1,202	22.28%	5,394
Henry	3,144	60.07%	2,052	39.21%	26	0.50%	7	0.13%	5	0.10%	1,092	20.86%	5,234
Houston	8,787	44.52%	10,672	54.07%	136	0.69%	24	0.12%	119	0.60%	-1,885	-9.55%	19,738
Jackson	10,989	71.71%	3,913	25.53%	290	1.89%	111	0.72%	22	0.14%	7,076	46.18%	15,325
Jefferson	99,531	45.85%	113,590	52.32%	1,754	0.81%	1,854	0.85%	361	0.17%	-14,059	-6.47%	217,090
Lamar	3,860	67.44%	1,739	30.38%	107	1.87%	9	0.16%	9	0.16%	2,121	37.06%	5,724
Lauderdale	15,549	67.06%	7,226	31.17%	188	0.81%	182	0.78%	40	0.17%	8,323	35.89%	23,185
Lawrence	6,810	82.21%	1,415	17.08%	31	0.37%	4	0.05%	24	0.29%	5,395	65.13%	8,284
Lee	8,427	44.98%	9,884	52.75%	131	0.70%	216	1.15%	79	0.42%	-1,457	-7.77%	18,737
Limestone	8,803	73.36%	2,997	24.98%	88	0.73%	87	0.73%	25	0.21%	5,806	48.38%	12,000
Lowndes	3,732	68.33%	1,621	29.68%	52	0.95%	36	0.66%	21	0.38%	2,111	38.65%	5,462
Macon	5,915	79.41%	1,387	18.62%	76	1.02%	39	0.52%	32	0.43%	4,528	60.79%	7,449
Madison	35,497	61.96%	20,959	36.59%	311	0.54%	312	0.54%	208	0.36%	14,538	25.37%	57,287
Marengo	4,731	54.04%	3,841	43.87%	62	0.71%	95	1.09%	26	0.30%	890	10.17%	8,755
Marion	6,244	67.12%	3,036	32.63%	8	0.09%	11	0.12%	4	0.04%	3,208	34.49%	9,303
Marshall	13,696	68.14%	6,006	29.88%	140	0.70%	216	1.07%	42	0.21%	7,690	38.26%	20,100
Mobile	50,264	47.47%	53,835	50.85%	1,097	1.04%	125	0.12%	555	0.52%	-3,571	-3.38%	105,876
Monroe	3,669	50.52%	3,476	47.86%	43	0.59%	8	0.11%	67	0.92%	193	2.66%	7,263
Montgomery	24,641	45.02%	29,360	53.64%	337	0.62%	294	0.54%	101	0.18%	-4,719	-8.62%	54,733
Morgan	16,547	63.68%	9,058	34.86%	146	0.56%	186	0.72%	49	0.19%	7,489	28.82%	25,986
Perry	4,486	67.13%	2,164	32.38%	18	0.27%	7	0.10%	8	0.12%	2,322	34.75%	6,683
Pickens	3,776	55.64%	2,969	43.75%	21	0.31%	7	0.10%	13	0.19%	807	11.89%	6,786
Pike	5,387	54.47%	4,363	44.12%	64	0.65%	54	0.55%	21	0.21%	1,024	10.35%	9,889
Randolph	3,539	58.55%	2,286	37.82%	91	1.51%	119	1.97%	9	0.15%	1,253	20.73%	6,044
Russell	8,077	64.14%	4,150	32.96%	193	1.53%	133	1.06%	39	0.31%	3,927	31.18%	12,592
Shelby	7,197	43.28%	9,035	54.33%	124	0.75%	235	1.41%	24	0.14%	-1,838	-11.05%	16,629
St. Clair	5,653	52.01%	4,877	44.87%	113	1.04%	202	1.86%	38	0.35%	776	7.14%	10,869
Sumter	3,457	60.77%	2,191	38.51%	34	0.60%	1	0.02%	6	0.11%	1,266	22.26%	5,689
Talladega	10,577	60.07%	6,425	36.49%	380	2.16%	46	0.26%	180	1.02%	4,152	23.58%	17,608
Tallapoosa	7,614	57.84%	5,237	39.79%	176	1.34%	113	0.86%	23	0.17%	2,377	18.05%	13,163
Tuscaloosa	20,275	54.79%	16,021	43.29%	317	0.86%	293	0.79%	100	0.27%	4,254	11.50%	37,006
Walker	16,232	68.46%	7,389	31.16%	51	0.22%	23	0.10%	15	0.06%	8,843	37.30%	23,710
Washington	3,471	61.22%	2,171	38.29%	11	0.19%	5	0.09%	12	0.21%	1,300	22.93%	5,670
Wilcox	3,723	66.90%	1,824	32.78%	14	0.25%	2	0.04%	2	0.04%	1,899	34.12%	5,565
Winston	4,134	52.54%	3,710	47.15%	4	0.05%	17	0.22%	3	0.04%	424	5.39%	7,868
Totals	659,170	55.73%	504,070	42.61%	9,198	0.78%	6,669	0.56%	3,743	0.32%	155,100	13.12%	1,182,850

==== Counties that flipped from Republican to Democratic ====
- Autauga
- Barbour
- Bibb
- Blount
- Butler
- Calhoun
- Chambers
- Cherokee
- Chilton
- Choctaw
- Clarke
- Clay
- Cleburne
- Coffee
- Colbert
- Conecuh
- Coosa
- Covington
- Crenshaw
- Cullman
- Dale
- Dallas
- DeKalb
- Elmore
- Escambia
- Etowah
- Fayette
- Franklin
- Geneva
- Hale
- Henry
- Jackson
- Lauderdale
- Lawrence
- Limestone
- Madison
- Marengo
- Marion
- Marshall
- Monroe
- Morgan
- Perry
- Pickens
- Pike
- Randolph
- Russell
- St. Clair
- Talladega
- Tallapoosa
- Tuscaloosa
- Walker
- Washington
- Winston

=== By congressional district ===
Carter won 5 of the state's 7 congressional districts, including one that elected a Republican.

District	Carter	Ford	Representative
1st	49.2%	50.8%	Jack Edwards
2nd	53.9%	46.1%	Bill Dickinson
3rd	59.5%	40.5%	Bill Nichols
4th	65.3%	34.7%	Tom Bevill
5th	68%	32%	Robert E. Jones Jr.
5th	68%	32%	Ronnie Flippo
6th	43.8%	56.2%	John H. Buchanan Jr.
7th	56.6%	43.4%	Walter Flowers

== See also ==
- United States presidential elections in Alabama

== Works cited ==
- Black, Earl; Black, Merle (1992). The Vital South: How Presidents Are Elected. Harvard University Press. ISBN 0674941306.
