= 2004 Alabama Democratic presidential primary =

- June 1, 2004

54 Democratic National Convention delegates (47 pledged, 7 unpledged) The number of pledged delegates received is determined by the popular vote
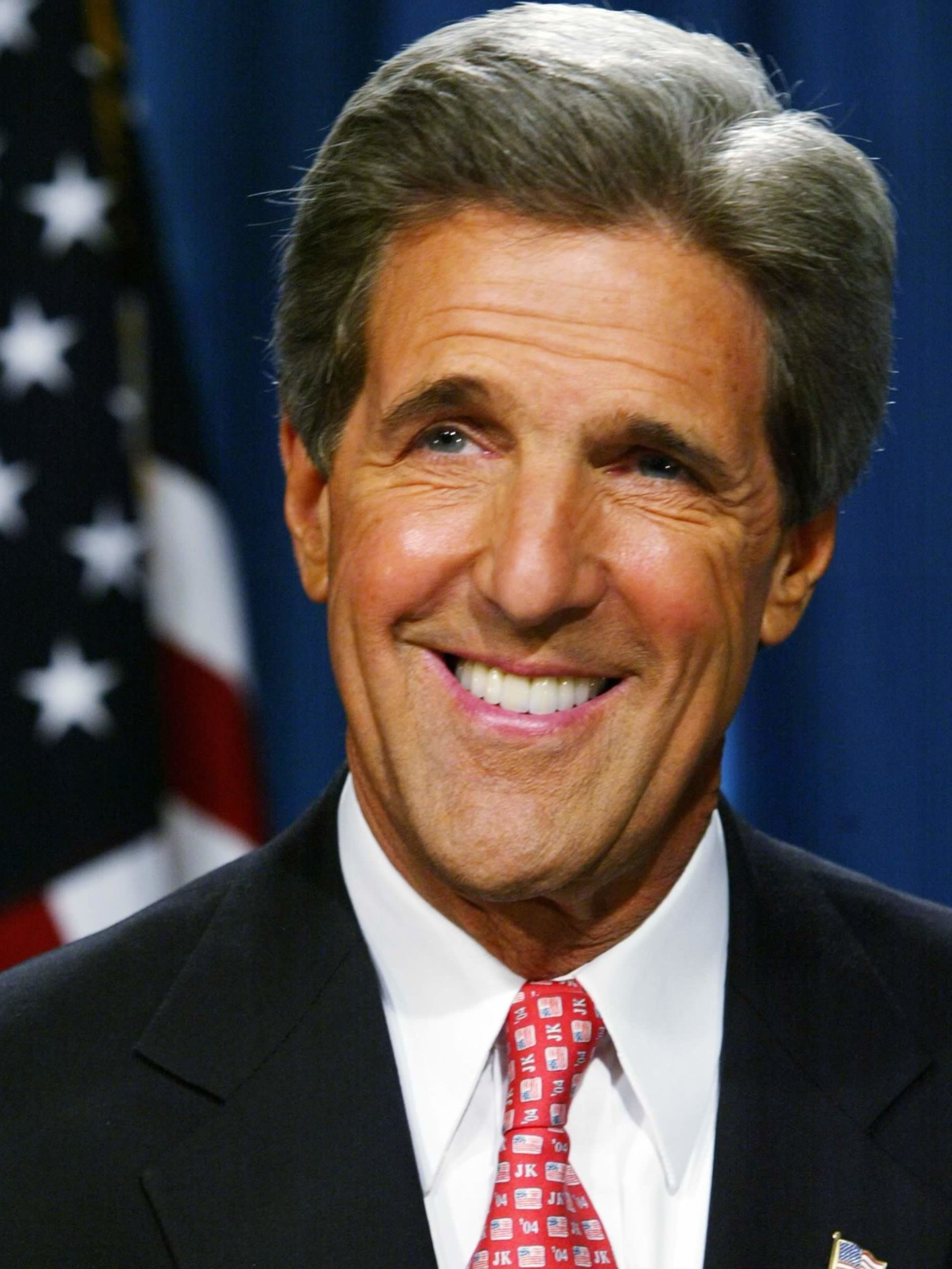

Candidate	John Kerry	Uncommitted
Home state	Massachusetts	–
Delegate count	47	7
Popular vote	164,021	38,223
Percentage	75.04%	17.49%
- Primary results by county Kerry: 50–60% 60–70% 70–80% 80–90% 90–100%

In the United States, the 2004 Alabama Democratic presidential primary (held June 1) was one of the last remaining tests of some of the leading contenders for the Democratic Party's nomination as its candidate for the 2004 presidential election.

== Analysis ==
By this primary, John Kerry already secured the nomination. He easily won with 75% of the vote, including every county and congressional district. The largest turnout by far came from Jefferson County, Alabama, where Kerry won with almost 92%. Also at roll call at the convention, Carol Moseley-Braun received 7 delegate votes despite not being on the ballot in the Alabama state primary.

== Results ==
United States presidential primary election in Alabama, 2004
Party	Candidate	Votes	Percentage	Delegates
Democratic	John Kerry	164,021	75.04%	47
Democratic	Uncommitted	38,223	17.49%	7
Democratic	Dennis Kucinich	9,076	4.15%	0
Democratic	Lyndon LaRouche	7,254	3.32%	0
Totals		218,574	100.00%	54
