= Fountain Correctional Facility =

Prison in Alabama, United States

Coordinates: 31°9′25″N 87°27′56″W

- Interactive map of Fountain Correctional Facility
- Location: Atmore, Alabama
- Status: open
- Security class: medium
- Capacity: 1255
- Opened: 1928
- Managed by: Alabama Department of Corrections

Fountain Correctional Facility is an Alabama Department of Corrections prison located in Atmore, Alabama. The 8,200-acre (3,300 ha) facility is located along Alabama Highway 21, about 7 miles (11 km) north of the Atmore city center.

The prison may hold up to 855 medium-custody male prisoners. The prison has agricultural operations, cattle operations, and vegetable gardens. Fountain and Coastal Alabama Community College (formerly Jefferson Davis Community College) offer vocational programs to the prisoners. The annual budget is $8,132,000.

J. O. Davis Correctional Facility, an extension of Fountain, is a 400-prisoner unit. The unit was named after a previous Fountain warden.

== History ==
In 1928 the Moffett Prison Farm opened. It later received the name "Atmore Prison Farm." The facility burned down in 1949. In 1955 it was rebuilt and named for a prison guard who was killed at work. Davis opened in 1973. In periods of the 1970s the Fountain facility, built for 632 prisoners, instead housed over 1,000. In 1975 John Boone, the director of the National Campaign Against Prisons and a former prison commissioner in Massachusetts, said that Fountain and the Draper Correctional Facility had situations where "at any time the prisoners want to, they could take complete charge by force." On Friday, August 29, 1975, two U.S. district court federal judges, William Brevard Hand and Frank M. Johnson Jr., prohibited Alabama authorities from sending any more prisoners to Fountain, Draper, Holman Correctional Facility, and the Medical and Diagnostic Center, due to overcrowding; the four prisons, designed to hold 2,212 prisoners, were holding about 3,800.

In 1993, prisoners who did not want to work in the fields were shackled during work times. The prisoners filed lawsuits against this process.

A fire damaged the Davis facility on March 30, 1995. By October 8, 1995, the Davis facility had been refurbished.

The city of Atmore annexed the land in the prison in 2008. The Alabama DOC asked for the city to annex the land.
