= Atmore Commercial Historic District =

Historic district in Alabama, United States

- Atmore Historic Commercial District
- U.S. National Register of Historic Places
- U.S. Historic district
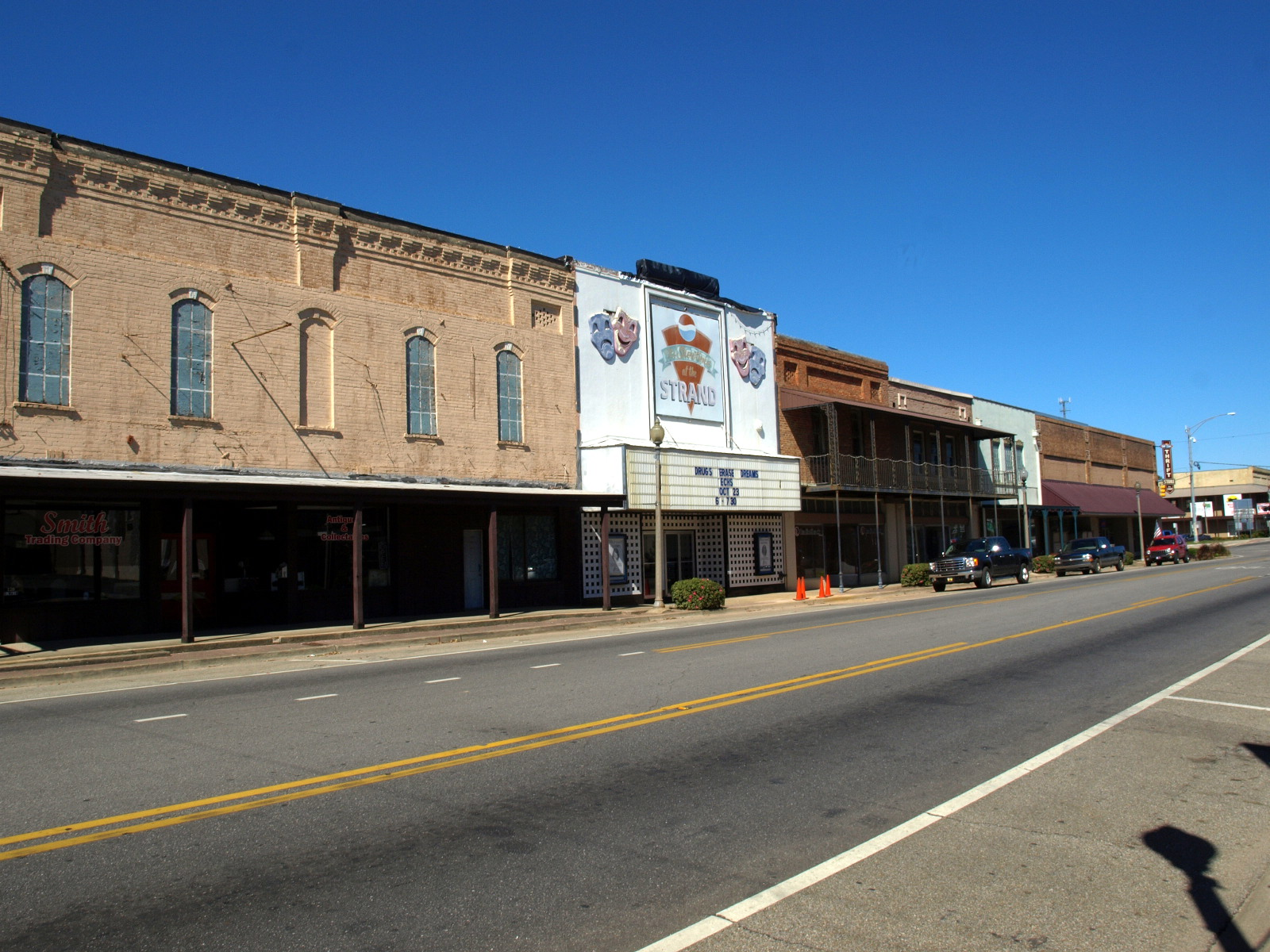

- Location within Alabama Location within the United States
- Location: Carney, Main, Trammell, Roberts, Presley, E. Church & Ridgeley Sts., Pensacola, Nashville & Louisville Aves., Atmore, Alabama
- Coordinates: 31.0240°N 87.4938°W
- Area: 13 acres (5.3 ha)
- NRHP reference No.: 100004641
- Added to NRHP: June 18, 2021

The Atmore Historic Commercial District is a 13-acre (5.3 ha) historic district in Atmore, Alabama, United States. It includes parts or all of Carney, Main, Trammell, Roberts, Presley, East Church and Ridgeley Streets, Pensacola, Nashville and Louisville Avenues.

In 2019 the state of Alabama recognized an Atmore Commercial Historic District, and the district was nominated to the National Register of Historic Places.

The district then included 72 contributing buildings and 25 non-contributing ones. "According to the city’s application written by McNair Historic Preservation Inc., the city, divided by an active east to west railroad track, holds many historic buildings of the 20th century, and many are still being used today for commercial purposes. According to the latest survey in 2002, the whole city can boast approximately 580 structures that are 50 years old or more."

It was added to the National Register of Historic Places in 2021.

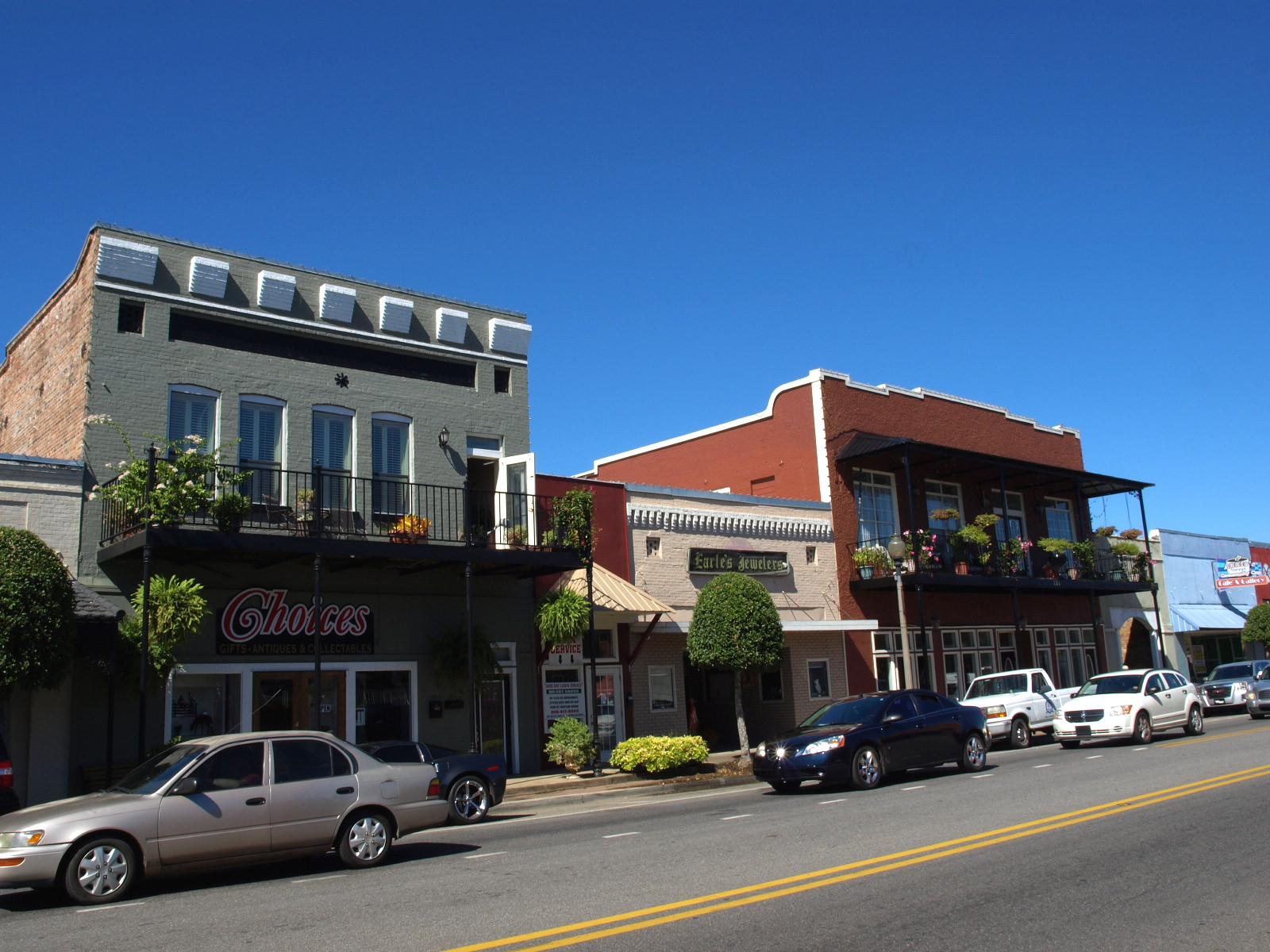
Main St.
