= Atmore, Alabama =

City in Alabama, United States

- City
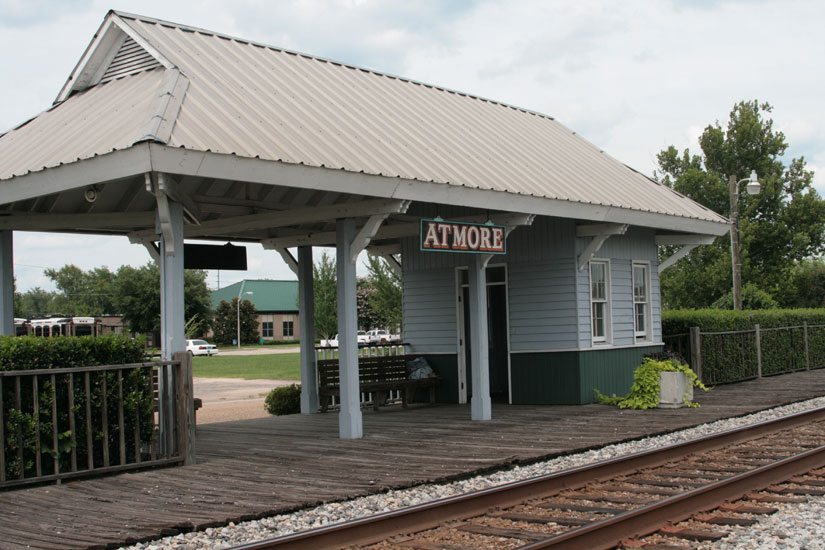
- Former Atmore Amtrak station

- Flag Seal

- Location of Atmore in Escambia County, Alabama
- Coordinates: 31°04′25″N 87°29′20″W
- Country: United States
- State: Alabama
- County: Escambia
- Incorporated: May 9, 1907

Area
  - City: 21.937 sq mi (56.816 km^{2})
  - Land: 21.862 sq mi (56.622 km^{2})
  - Water: 0.075 sq mi (0.194 km^{2})
- Elevation: 279 ft (85 m)

Population (2020)
  - City: 8,391
  - Estimate (2022): 8,330
  - Density: 381/sq mi (147.1/km^{2})
  - Urban: 6,390
  - Metro: 36,666
- Time zone: UTC−6 (Central (CST))
  - Summer (DST): UTC−5 (CDT)
- ZIP Codes: 36502, 36504
- Area code: 251
- FIPS code: 01-03004
- GNIS feature ID: 2403129
- Sales tax: 10.0%
- Website: welcometoatmore.com

Atmore is a city in Escambia County, Alabama, United States. The population was 8,391 at the 2020 census. It was incorporated on May 9, 1907.

The Atmore Commercial Historic District is listed on the National Register of Historic Places.

The Poarch Band of Creek Indians is headquartered in Atmore.

== History ==
Atmore was first recorded as a stop called Williams Station on the Mobile and Great Northern Railroad. The town was originally to be named "Carney", in honor of a citizen who owned a sawmill in the town. Mr. Carney's brother had already established a town nearby with the same name, and Mr. Carney was allowed to name the town after his close friend C.P. Atmore, General Passenger Agent of the Louisville and Nashville Railroad. Mr. Atmore never visited the town.

In 2008 the city of Atmore annexed Alabama Department of Corrections prison property, including Holman Correctional Facility and Fountain Correctional Facility. The Alabama DOC asked for the city to annex the land.

== Geography ==
The southern border of Atmore is the Florida state line. A new section of the city was incorporated 6 miles (10 km) to the north. Mobile is 51 miles (82 km) to the southwest, and Pensacola, Florida, is 49 miles (79 km) south.

According to the United States Census Bureau, Atmore has a total area of 21.937 square miles (56.816 km^{2}), of which 21.862 square miles (56.622 km^{2}) is land and 0.029 square miles (0.075 km^{2}) is water.

=== Climate ===
Climate is characterized by mild to high temperatures and evenly distributed precipitation throughout the year. The Köppen Climate Classification sub-type for this climate is "Cfa" (Humid Subtropical Climate).

Climate data for Atmore, Alabama, 1991–2020 normals, extremes 1940–present
Month	Jan	Feb	Mar	Apr	May	Jun	Jul	Aug	Sep	Oct	Nov	Dec	Year
Record high °F (°C)	84 (29)	86 (30)	90 (32)	95 (35)	101 (38)	104 (40)	105 (41)	104 (40)	102 (39)	99 (37)	90 (32)	85 (29)	105 (41)
Mean maximum °F (°C)	75.3 (24.1)	77.4 (25.2)	83.5 (28.6)	86.8 (30.4)	92.7 (33.7)	96.2 (35.7)	97.3 (36.3)	97.0 (36.1)	94.2 (34.6)	89.1 (31.7)	81.9 (27.7)	77.2 (25.1)	98.3 (36.8)
Mean daily maximum °F (°C)	60.6 (15.9)	65.1 (18.4)	72.2 (22.3)	78.7 (25.9)	86.2 (30.1)	90.9 (32.7)	92.4 (33.6)	92.1 (33.4)	88.5 (31.4)	80.3 (26.8)	70.2 (21.2)	63.0 (17.2)	78.4 (25.7)
Daily mean °F (°C)	49.8 (9.9)	53.8 (12.1)	60.4 (15.8)	66.8 (19.3)	74.8 (23.8)	80.8 (27.1)	82.7 (28.2)	82.3 (27.9)	78.3 (25.7)	68.7 (20.4)	58.4 (14.7)	52.3 (11.3)	67.4 (19.7)
Mean daily minimum °F (°C)	39.1 (3.9)	42.5 (5.8)	48.6 (9.2)	54.9 (12.7)	63.5 (17.5)	70.7 (21.5)	73.0 (22.8)	72.5 (22.5)	68.1 (20.1)	57.1 (13.9)	46.7 (8.2)	41.6 (5.3)	56.5 (13.6)
Mean minimum °F (°C)	21.4 (−5.9)	25.7 (−3.5)	30.5 (−0.8)	39.0 (3.9)	49.1 (9.5)	61.6 (16.4)	67.2 (19.6)	65.4 (18.6)	55.5 (13.1)	40.1 (4.5)	29.8 (−1.2)	26.0 (−3.3)	19.9 (−6.7)
Record low °F (°C)	1 (−17)	10 (−12)	21 (−6)	29 (−2)	41 (5)	49 (9)	55 (13)	56 (13)	42 (6)	30 (−1)	17 (−8)	6 (−14)	1 (−17)
Average precipitation inches (mm)	5.97 (152)	4.82 (122)	5.41 (137)	4.84 (123)	5.09 (129)	6.00 (152)	6.94 (176)	5.56 (141)	5.43 (138)	3.60 (91)	4.60 (117)	5.38 (137)	63.64 (1,615)
Average snowfall inches (cm)	0.0 (0.0)	0.0 (0.0)	0.1 (0.25)	0.0 (0.0)	0.0 (0.0)	0.0 (0.0)	0.0 (0.0)	0.0 (0.0)	0.0 (0.0)	0.0 (0.0)	0.0 (0.0)	0.0 (0.0)	0.1 (0.25)
Average precipitation days (≥ 0.01 in)	10.4	8.6	8.8	7.6	8.7	11.6	13.5	12.1	8.5	5.8	7.3	9.6	112.5
Average snowy days (≥ 0.1 in)	0.0	0.0	0.0	0.0	0.0	0.0	0.0	0.0	0.0	0.0	0.0	0.0	0.0
Source 1: NOAA
Source 2: National Weather Service

== Demographics ==
Historical population
Census	Pop.	Note	%±
1910	1,060		—
1920	1,775		67.5%
1930	3,035		71.0%
1940	3,200		5.4%
1950	5,720		78.8%
1960	8,173		42.9%
1970	8,293		1.5%
1980	8,789		6.0%
1990	8,046		−8.5%
2000	7,676		−4.6%
2010	10,194		32.8%
2020	8,391		−17.7%
2022 (est.)	8,330	▼	−0.7%
U.S. Decennial Census; 2020 Census

Atmore first appeared on the 1910 U.S. Census as an incorporated town. By 1930, it became the largest city in Escambia County, though lost the title to former holder Brewton in 1940. It became the largest city again in 1950 and has held the distinction to date (2010). In 2010, the city became majority Black for the first time.

=== Racial and ethnic composition ===
Atmore city, Alabama – Racial and ethnic composition Note: the US Census treats Hispanic/Latino as an ethnic category. This table excludes Latinos from the racial categories and assigns them to a separate category. Hispanics/Latinos may be of any race.
Race / Ethnicity (NH = Non-Hispanic)	Pop 1980	Pop 1990	Pop 2000	Pop 2010	Pop 2020	% 1980	% 1990	% 2000	% 2010	% 2020
White alone (NH)	4,680	4,480	3,780	4,007	3,177	53.25%	55.68%	49.24%	39.31%	37.86%
Black or African American alone (NH)	3,786	3,262	3,541	5,646	4,551	43.08%	40.54%	46.13%	55.39%	54.24%
Native American or Alaska Native alone (NH)	258	274	185	182	183	2.94%	3.41%	2.41%	1.79%	2.18%
Asian alone (NH)	0	11	36	26	32	0.00%	0.14%	0.47%	0.26%	0.38%
Native Hawaiian or Pacific Islander alone (NH)	x	x	4	6	5	x	x	0.05%	0.06%	0.06%
Other race alone (NH)	0	0	6	6	10	0.00%	0.00%	0.08%	0.06%	0.12%
Mixed race or Multiracial (NH)	x	x	68	136	280	x	x	0.89%	1.33%	3.34%
Hispanic or Latino (any race)	65	19	56	185	153	0.74%	0.24%	0.73%	1.81%	1.82%
Total	8,789	8,046	7,676	10,194	8,391	100.00%	100.00%	100.00%	100.00%	100.00%

=== 2020 census ===
As of the 2020 census, Atmore had a population of 8,391. The median age was 40.6 years. 19.4% of residents were under the age of 18 and 17.1% of residents were 65 years of age or older. For every 100 females there were 121.3 males, and for every 100 females age 18 and over there were 128.0 males age 18 and over.

71.9% of residents lived in urban areas, while 28.1% lived in rural areas.

There were 2,908 households in Atmore, of which 29.5% had children under the age of 18 living in them. Of all households, 30.9% were married-couple households, 19.1% were households with a male householder and no spouse or partner present, and 44.9% were households with a female householder and no spouse or partner present. About 36.4% of all households were made up of individuals and 15.4% had someone living alone who was 65 years of age or older.

There were 3,348 housing units, of which 13.1% were vacant. The homeowner vacancy rate was 3.0% and the rental vacancy rate was 6.4%.

=== 2010 census ===
As of the 2010 census, there were 10194 people, the population density was 1,228 inhabitants per square mile (474/km^{2}). There were 3,480 housing units at an average density of 419.3 per square mile (161.9/km^{2}). The racial makeup of the city was 55.4% Black or African American, 39.3% White, 1.8% Native American, 0.3% Asian, 0.1% Pacific Islander, 0.1% from other races, and 1.3% from two or more races. 1.8% of the population were Hispanic or Latino of any race.

There were 3,002 households, out of which 26.1% had children under the age of 18 living with them, 34.9% were married couples living together, 23.1% had a female householder with no husband present, and 37.1% were non-families. 33.4% of all households were made up of individuals, and 14.4% had someone living alone who was 65 years of age or older. The average household size was 2.43 and the average family size was 3.09.

In the city, the population was spread out, with 18.6% under the age of 18, 9.1% from 18 to 24, 34.5% from 25 to 44, 24.9% from 45 to 64, and 12.9% who were 65 years of age or older. The median age was 37.4 years. For every 100 females, there were 155.5 males. For every 100 females age 18 and over, there were 207.4 males.

=== Atmore Census Division (1960–2020) ===
Historical population
Census	Pop.	Note	%±
1960	12,373		—
1970	12,221		−1.2%
1980	13,672		11.9%
1990	12,645		−7.5%
2000	12,980		2.6%
2010	12,372		−4.7%
2020	8,391		−32.2%
U.S. Decennial Census; 2020 Census

Atmore was created a census division in 1960 following the general reorganization of county precincts. Prior to 1960, Atmore was within the former Escambia County 7th precinct of Canoe.

== Economy ==
For most of the 20th century, the Atmore area was primarily a farming, timber, and light industry community. Major commercial industries have been Masland Carpets, Alto, and a local lumber company. For many years, the Vanity Fair lingerie company operated a manufacturing sewing plant in Atmore, offering employment to local citizens and surrounding communities.

The Poarch Band of Creek Indians has increased its relative economic contributions through the operation of Wind Creek Casino and Hotel near Atmore.

Holman Correctional Facility is located north of the central city, and features a male death row and execution chamber. Fountain Correctional Facility is 10 miles (16 km) north of the Atmore city center.

== Arts and culture ==
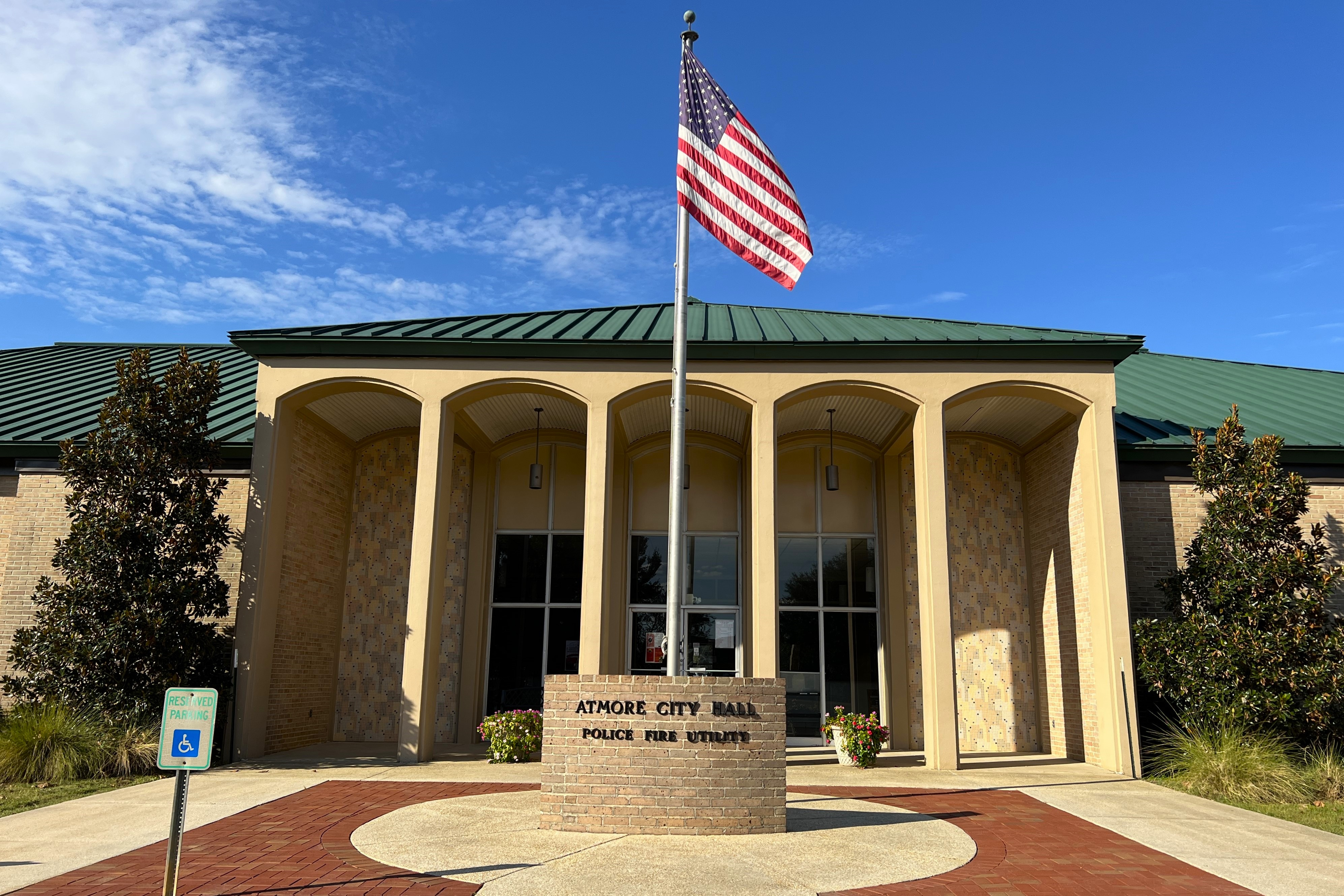
Atmore City Hall

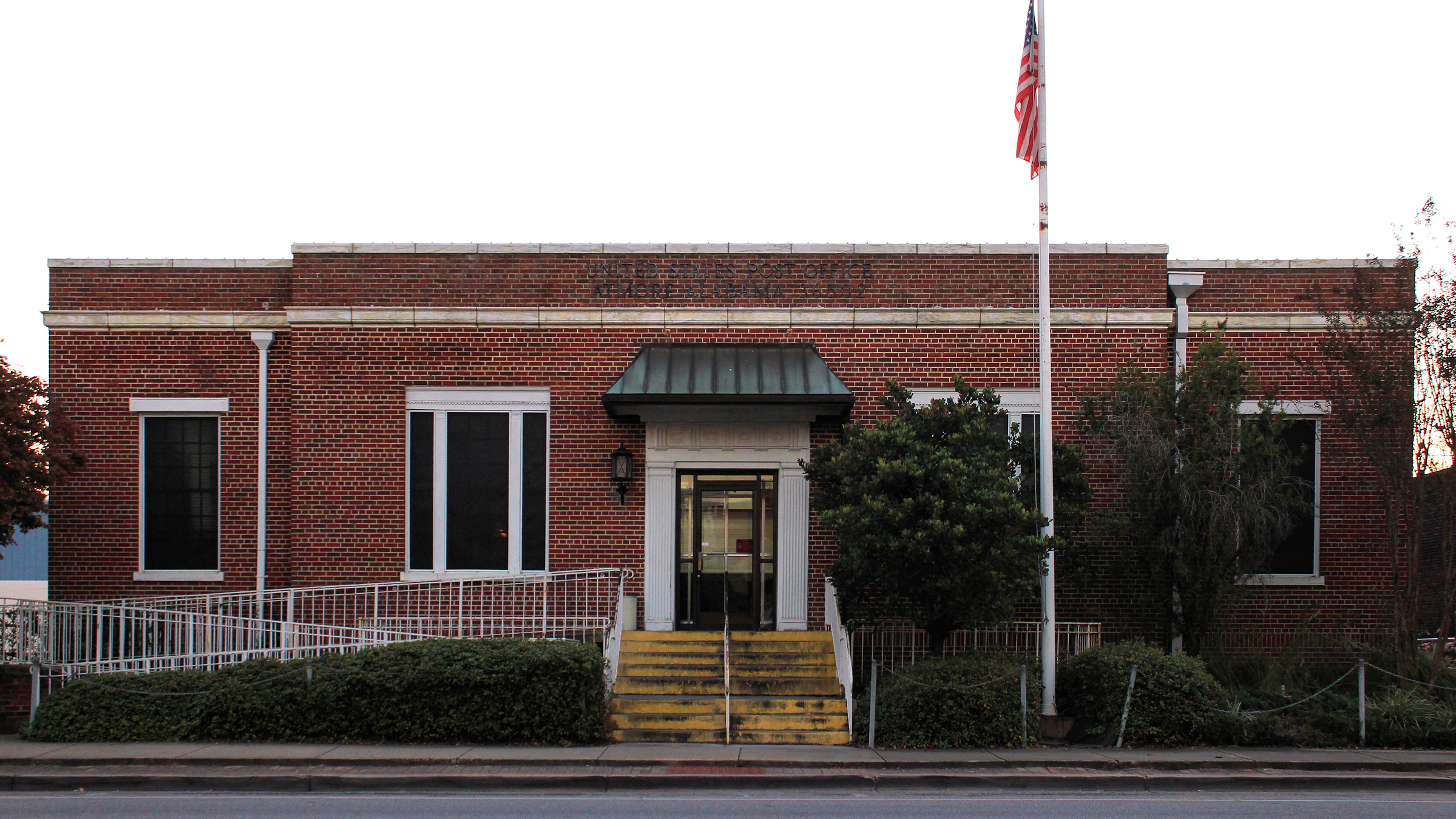
Atmore Post Office

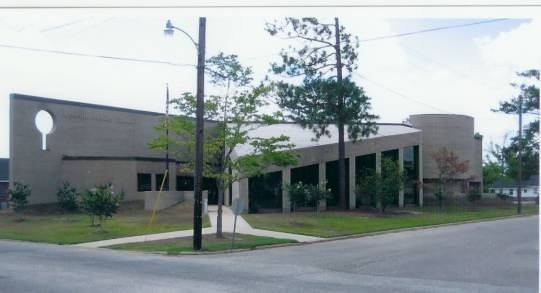
Atmore Public Library

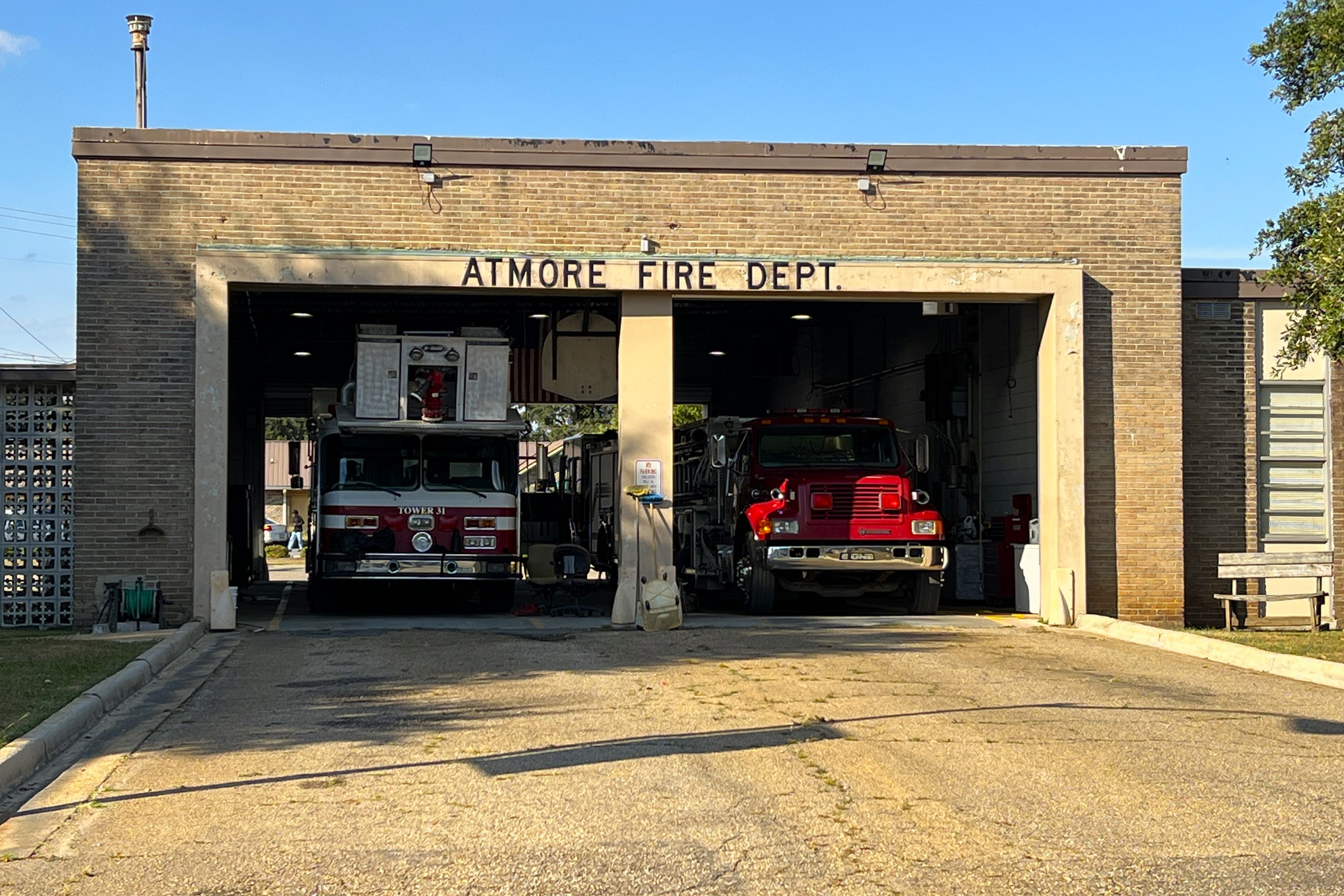
Atmore Fire Department

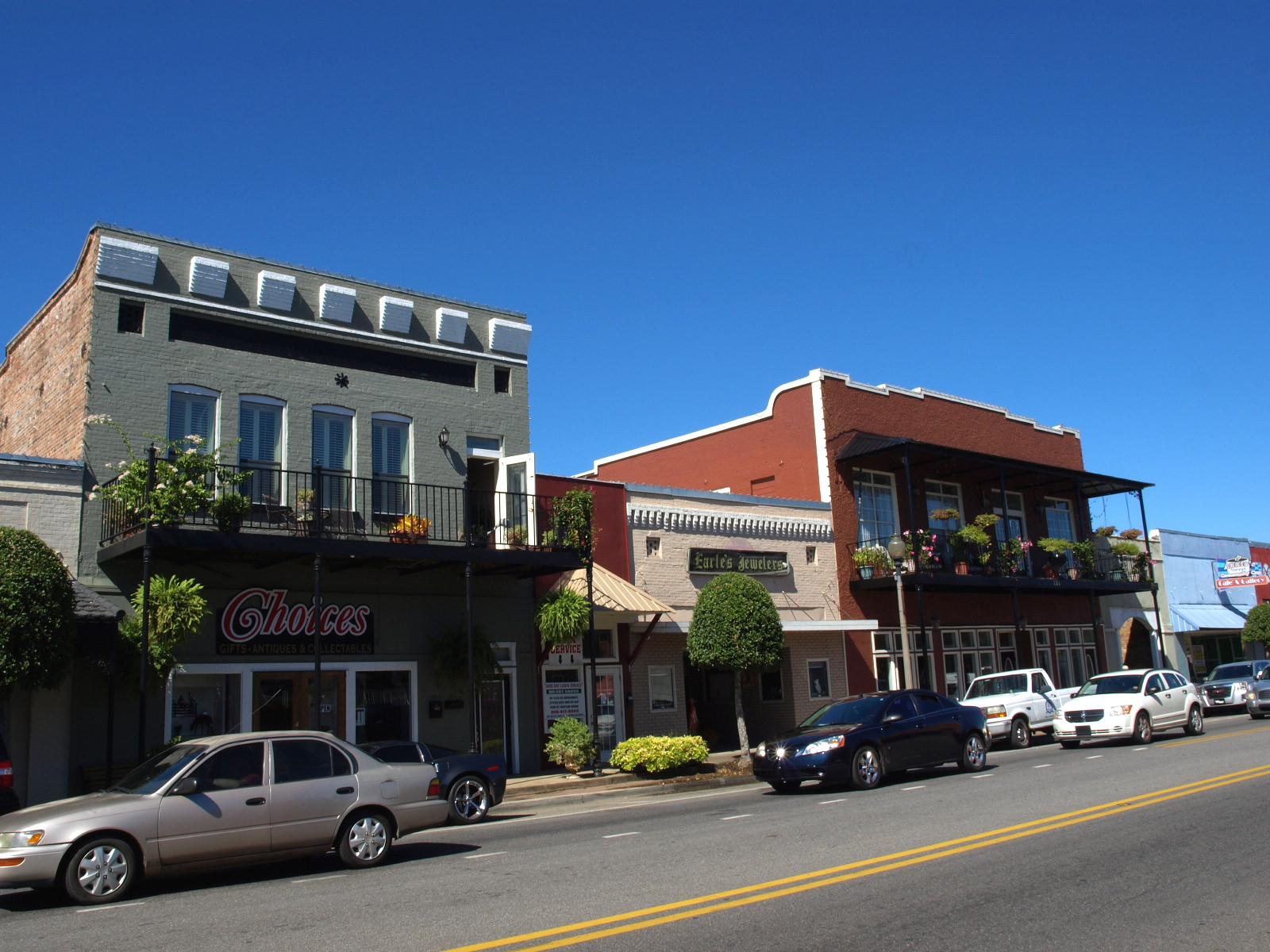
Main Street

Local events include:

- Mayfest, a May event featuring sports, arts and crafts, food, and entertainment.
- A Taste of the South, an annual event featuring entertainment and local food.
- Williams Station Day, a celebration of Atmore's history beginning in 1866 as Williams Station. The event includes an arts and crafts, fiddlers, entertainment, a model train show, and a sugar cane mill.
- Poarch Creek Indian Pow-wow, an annual Thanksgiving event featuring turkey, roasted corn, and a dance competition.

== Parks and recreation ==
Atmore has recreational and sports facilities, including Atmore Heritage Park.

== Government ==
Atmore is governed by a mayor and members of a city council elected from five districts within the city.

== Education ==
Escambia County Public School System is the public school district of Atmore. Schools in Atmore include: Rachel Patterson Elementary School, Escambia County Middle School (the largest school in the system), and Escambia County High School (the first public county high school in the state of Alabama).

Private schools include Atmore Christian School, and Reid State.

Prior to 1970, African-American children attended black schools such as the Escambia County Training School in Atmore.

An adjunct campus of Coastal Alabama Community College Brewton is located here, offering associate degrees and technical school training.

== Infrastructure ==
=== Transportation ===
US Highway 31 and Alabama Highway 21 pass through the city.

Atmore Municipal Airport features a 4,952 ft (1,509 m) runway.

The town is serviced by two freight railroads, the Alabama and Gulf Coast Railway and CSX. Historically, Atmore had a Frisco Railway station, served by a section of the railroad's Sunnyland passenger train. A Louisville and Nashville station was a stop for the Azalean (Cincinnati-New Orleans), the Piedmont Limited (New York-New Orleans) and local Montgomery-New Orleans trains. The Frisco service ended in 1955, and the Louisville and Nashville in 1971. Atmore station was later served by Amtrak's Gulf Breeze train (Birmingham-Montgomery-Mobile) until that service ended in 1995.It was served by the Sunset Limited until 2005 when Katrina cut the tracks.

Escambia County Alabama Transit System provides dial-a-ride bus service throughout the city and county.

=== Health care ===
Atmore Community Hospital, an affiliate of Infirmary Health Systems of Mobile, offers full acute care in a two-story facility.

== Notable people ==
- Paul Birch, actor and the original "Marlboro Man", born in Atmore
- Bobby Brantley, 13th lieutenant governor of Florida
- Marva Collins, American educator
- Paul Crawford, jazz musician and music historian
- Glenn L. Emmons, commissioner of the Bureau of Indian Affairs from 1953 to 1961
- Evander Holyfield, world heavyweight boxing champion
- William C. Maxwell, namesake of Maxwell Air Force Base
- Don McNeal, star defensive back for Alabama and the Miami Dolphins
- Ron Middleton, former NFL tight end
- Woodrow McClain Parker, Professor Emeritus, mental health counselor, and author
- Art White, professional wrestler and football player
- Michael Williams, NFL player
