= List of places in Alabama: S–Z =

This list of current cities, towns, unincorporated communities, counties, and other recognized places in the U.S. state of Alabama also includes information on the number of counties in which the place lies, the name of its principal county, and its lower and upper ZIP Code bounds, if applicable.

== See also ==
- Alabama
- List of cities in Alabama
- List of counties in Alabama

== S ==
Name of place	Number of counties	Principal county	Lower zip code	Upper zip code
Saco	1	Pike County	36081	
Safford	1	Dallas County	36773	
Saginaw	1	Shelby County	35137	
Sahama Village	1	Tuscaloosa County	35404	
Saint Bernard	1	Cullman County	35138	
Saint Clair	1	Lowndes County	36774	
Saint Clair Springs	1	St. Clair County	35146	
Saint Clair Store	1	Madison County		
St. Elmo	1	Mobile County	36568	
Saint Florian	1	Lauderdale County	35633	
Saint Ives	1	Talladega County		
Saints Crossroads	1	Franklin County	35653	
Saint Stephens	1	Washington County	36569	
Saks	1	Calhoun County	36203	
Salco	1	Mobile County		
Salem	1	Dallas County	36767	
Salem	1	Fayette County		
Salem	1	Lee County	36874	
Salem	1	Limestone County	35620	
Salitpa	1	Clarke County	36570	
Salt Well	1	Marengo County		
Samantha	1	Tuscaloosa County	35482	
Samford University	1	Jefferson County	35229	
Samoset	1	Walker County		
Samson	1	Geneva County	36477	
Samuels Chapel	1	Etowah County	35952	
Sanders Hill	1	Pike County		
Sandfield	1	Pike County	36081	
Sandfort	1	Russell County	36875	
Sand Mountain	1	Bibb County		
Sand Rock	2	Cherokee County	35983	
Sand Rock	2	DeKalb County	35983	
Sandtown	1	Tuscaloosa County		
Sandusky	1	Jefferson County	35214	
Sandy Creek	1	Chambers County	36850	
Sandy Point	1	Barbour County		
Sandy Ridge	1	Lowndes County	36047	
Sandy Springs	1	Cherokee County		
Sanford	1	Covington County	36420	
Sanford Springs	1	Cherokee County		
Sanie	1	St. Clair County	35120	
San Souci Beach	1	Mobile County	36509	
Santuck	1	Elmore County	36092	
Sapps	1	Pickens County	35447	
Saragossa	1	Walker County	35578	
Saraland	1	Mobile County	36571	
Saratoga	1	Marshall County	35950	
Sardine	1	Escambia County	36441	
Sardis	1	Bullock County	35089	
Sardis	1	Crenshaw County		
Sardis	1	Dallas County	36775	
Sardis	1	Walker County		
Sardis City	3	DeKalb County	35957	
Sardis City	3	Etowah County	35957	
Sardis City	3	Marshall County	35957	
Sardis Springs	1	Limestone County	35611	
Sargon	1	Jefferson County		
Satsuma	1	Mobile County	36572	
Saucer	1	Butler County	36030	
Savannah Ford	1	Lauderdale County		
Saville	1	Crenshaw County	36041	
Sawyerville	1	Hale County	36776	
Sayre	1	Jefferson County	35139	
Sayre Mines	1	Jefferson County		
Sayreton	1	Jefferson County	35207	
Scant City	1	Marshall County	35016	
Scarce Grease	1	Limestone County	35647	
Scenic Heights	1	Etowah County	35901	
Schenks	1	Calhoun County	36279	
Schley	1	Coosa County		
Schmits Mill	1	Talladega County	35096	
Schuster	1	Wilcox County		
Scotland	1	Monroe County	36471	
Scotrock	1	Shelby County		
Scott City	1	Jefferson County	35094	
Scott Ford	1	Franklin County		
Scottland	1	Bullock County		
Scottrock	1	Shelby County		
Scottsboro	1	Jackson County	35768	
Scottsboro Crossroads	1	Henry County		
Scott Station	1	Perry County		
Scrange	1	Baldwin County	36552	
Scranton	1	Geneva County		
Scratch Ankle	1	Monroe County		
Scratch Hill	1	Sumter County		
Screamer	1	Henry County		
Scrougeout	1	Etowah County		
Scyrene	1	Clarke County	36436	
Seaboard	1	Washington County	36529	
Seacliff	1	Baldwin County	36532	
Seale	1	Russell County	36875	
Sealy Springs	1	Houston County	36320	
Searcy	1	Butler County		
Searight	1	Crenshaw County	36028	
Searles	1	Tuscaloosa County	35468	
Section	1	Jackson County	35771	
Seddon	1	St. Clair County		
Sedgefield	1	Bullock County		
Sedgefield	1	Dallas County		
Segco	1	Walker County	35580	
Segers	1	Limestone	35756	
Self Creek	1	Jefferson County		
Selfville	1	Blount County	35172	
Sellers	1	Montgomery County	36046	
Sellersville	1	Geneva County	36318	
Selma	1	Dallas County	36701	
Selmont	1	Dallas County	36701	
Selmont-West Selmont	1	Dallas County		
Seloca	1	Jefferson County		
Seman	1	Elmore County	36014	
Seminole	1	Baldwin County	36574	
Semmes	1	Mobile County	36575	
Serange	1	Baldwin County		
Service	1	Choctaw County	36919	
Sessions	1	Tallapoosa County		
Seven Hills	1	Mobile County	36601	
Seven Hundred Thirty Mile Spur	1	Calhoun County		
Seven Pines	1	Franklin County		
Sewell	1	Randolph County		
Seymour	1	Bibb County		
Shacklesville	1	Butler County	36033	
Shades Cliff	1	Jefferson County		
Shades Crest Estates	1	Jefferson County	35216	
Shady Brook	1	Jefferson County	35023	
Shady Grove	1	Clay County	35072	
Shady Grove	1	Coffee County	36323	
Shady Grove	1	Franklin County	35581	
Shady Grove	1	Jefferson County	35005	
Shady Grove	1	Pike County	36036	
Shady Grove	1	Washington County		
Shady Lane	1	Madison County		
Shadywood	1	Jefferson County		
Shanghai	1	Limestone County		
Shannon	1	Jefferson County	35142	
Sharps Mill	1	Lauderdale County		
Sharps Spur	1	Macon County		
Shaw	1	Pickens County		
Shawmut	1	Chambers County	36854	
Shawnee	1	Wilcox County	36726	
Sheffield	1	Colbert County	35660	
Shelby	1	Shelby County	35143	
Shelby Shores	1	Shelby County		
Shelby Springs	1	Shelby County		
Shell	1	Butler County		
Shellhorn	1	Pike County	36001	
Shepherd Hill	1	Montgomery County		
Sheppard	1	Wilcox County		
Sherman	1	Jefferson County		
Sherman Heights	1	Calhoun County	36203	
Sherman Heights	1	Jefferson County		
Sherwood Forest	1	Lauderdale County	35633	
Sherwood Park	1	Madison County		
Shiloh	1	Chambers County		
Shiloh	1	DeKalb County	35967	
Shiloh	1	Marengo County	36754	
Shiloh	1	Pike County	36005	
Shinebone	1	Clay County	36266	
Shingle	1	Franklin County	35581	
Shirley	1	Tuscaloosa County		
Shirleys Crossroads	1	Crenshaw County		
Shoals Acres	1	Lauderdale County	35645	
Shopton	1	Bullock County	36029	
Short Creek	1	Jefferson County	35118	
Shorter	1	Macon County	36075	
Shorters	1	Macon County		
Shorterville	1	Henry County	36373	
Shortleaf	1	Marengo County	36732	
Shottsville	1	Marion County	35570	
Shotwell	1	Lee County		
Shrader	1	Jackson County		
Shreve	1	Conecuh County	36456	
Sibert	1	Etowah County		
Sibert	1	Mobile County		
Sico	1	Talladega County	35150	
Siddonsville	1	Marengo County	36738	
Sidney	1	Marshall County		
Sidney	1	Mobile County	36522	
Sigma	1	Houston County	36303	
Sigsbee	1	DeKalb County		
Sikes	1	Chambers County		
Sikesville	1	Clay County	36276	
Silas	1	Choctaw County	36919	
Siloam	1	Sumter County	36907	
Siluria	1	Shelby County	35144	
Silver Creek	1	Mobile County		
Silver Cross	1	Washington County	36538	
Silverhill	1	Baldwin County	36576	
Silver Run	1	Talladega County	36268	
Simcoe	1	Cullman County	35055	
Simmons Crossroads	1	Tallapoosa County		
Simmsville	1	Shelby County	35043	
Simpson	1	Tallapoosa County		
Sims Chapel	1	Washington County	36533	
Simsville	1	Bullock County	36089	
Sipsey	1	Fayette County		
Sipsey	1	Walker County	35584	
Sixmile	1	Bibb County	35035	
Six Mile	1	Morgan County		
Six Way	1	Morgan County		
Skaggs Corner	1	DeKalb County	35978	
Skeggs Crossroads	1	Clay County	35072	
Skinem	1	Madison County	35750	
Skinnerton	1	Conecuh County	36401	
Skipperville	1	Dale County	36374	
Skirum	1	DeKalb County	35963	
Sky Ball	1	Blount County		
Skyhaven Estates	1	Etowah County		
Skyline	1	Jackson County	35768	
Skyline Acres	1	Madison County		
Skyline Estates	1	Jefferson County	35216	
Sky Ranch	1	Jefferson County	35216	
Skyview	1	Jefferson County	35023	
Slackland	1	Cherokee County	35901	
Slater	1	Choctaw County		
Slaughters	1	Tallapoosa County		
Sledge	1	Sumter County		
Slick Ford	1	Winston County		
Slickrock Ford	1	Franklin County		
Sliocco Springs	1	Talladega County		
Sloan	1	Blount County		
Slocomb	1	Geneva County	36375	
Sloss	1	Walker County		
Smithfield	1	Jefferson County		
Smith Hill	1	Bibb County	35184	
Smith Institute	1	Etowah County	35957	
Smithport	1	Mobile County		
Smiths	1	Lee County	36877	
Smiths Ford	1	Bibb County		
Smiths Mill	1	Talladega County		
Smithson	1	Jefferson County	35023	
Smithsonia	1	Lauderdale County	35633	
Smiths Station	1	Lee County	36877	
Smithtown	1	Mobile County		
Smoke Rise	1	Blount County		
Smuteye	1	Bullock County	36061	
Smyer	1	Clarke County	36727	
Smyrna	1	Houston County	36303	
Snead	1	Blount County	35952	
Snead Crossroads	1	Blount County		
Snells Crossroads	1	Dale County		
Snoddy	1	Greene County	35462	
Snowdoun	1	Montgomery County	36105	
Snow Hill	1	Dale County		
Snow Hill	1	Wilcox County	36778	
Snowtown	1	Jefferson County	35062	
Socapatoy	1	Coosa County	35089	
Social Town	1	Crenshaw County		
Society Hill	1	Macon County	36801	
Soleo	1	Coosa County	35072	
Somerville	1	Morgan County	35670	
Sonoma	1	Etowah County		
South	1	Covington County	36474	
South	1	Montgomery County	36116	
South Ardmore	1	Limestone County		
South Calera	1	Shelby County	35040	
Southern Junction	1	Houston County		
South Gadsden	1	Etowah County		
South Guntersville	1	Marshall County	35976	
South Haleyville	1	Marion County	35565	
South Highlands	1	Jefferson County	35205	
South Hill	1	DeKalb County		
South Holt	1	Tuscaloosa County	35404	
South Lowell	1	Walker County	35501	
Southmont	1	Montgomery County		
South Orchards	1	Mobile County		
South Sheffield	1	Colbert County	35674	
Southside	2	Calhoun County	35901	
Southside	2	Etowah County	35901	
Southtown	1	Marshall County	35976	
South Vinemont	1	Cullman County	35179	
Southwood	1	Jefferson County	35229	
Souwilpa	1	Choctaw County	36919	
Spain Ford	1	Winston County		
Spanish Fort	1	Baldwin County	36527	
Sparks Gap	1	Jefferson County		
Sparta	1	Conecuh County		
Spaulding	1	Jefferson County		
Speake	1	Lawrence County	35619	
Spears	1	Geneva County		
Speed	1	Coosa County	36026	
Speeds Water Mill	1	Pickens County	35466	
Speigener	1	Elmore County	36022	
Speigner	1	Elmore County		
Spencer Store	1	Limestone County		
Spocari	1	Marengo County		
Sprague	1	Montgomery County	36069	
Springbrook	1	Tuscaloosa County	35404	
Springdale	1	Jefferson County		
Springdale	1	Jefferson County	35217	
Springfield	1	Clarke County	36784	
Springfield	1	Lauderdale County	35652	
Springfield	1	Randolph County	36274	
Spring Garden	1	Cherokee County	36275	
Spring Hill	1	Barbour County	36018	
Spring Hill	1	Butler County		
Spring Hill	1	Choctaw County		
Springhill	1	Clay County		
Spring Hill	1	Cullman County		
Spring Hill	1	Escambia County		
Spring Hill	1	Mobile County	36608	
Spring Hill	1	Pike County	36081	
Spring Hill	1	Walker County	35549	
Spring Lake Estates	1	Jefferson County		
Springs Junction	1	Shelby County		
Spring Valley	1	Colbert County	35674	
Spring Valley	1	Montgomery County		
Spring Villa	1	Lee County		
Springville	1	St. Clair County	35146	
Springville Lake Estates	1	St. Clair County	35146	
Sprott	1	Perry County	36779	
Spruce Pine	1	Franklin County	35585	
Stafford	1	Pickens County		
Stamp	1	DeKalb County		
Standard	1	Sumter County		
Standard	1	Walker County	35580	
Standing Rock	1	Chambers County	36855	
Stanley	1	Covington County	36420	
Stanley Crossroads	1	Escambia County		
Stansel	1	Pickens County	35481	
Stanton	1	Chilton County	36790	
Stapler Ford	1	Marshall County		
Stapleton	1	Baldwin County	36578	
Star Hill	1	Barbour County		
Starlington	1	Butler County		
Star Muskogee Creek	3	Barbour County		
Star Muskogee Creek	3	Crenshaw County		
Star Muskogee Creek	3	Pike County		
Staryeacre Ford	1	Jefferson County		
State Line	1	Houston County	36320	
Statesville	1	Autauga County	36701	
Stedman	1	Covington County		
Steele	1	St. Clair County	35987	
Steele Crossing	1	Madison County	37328	
Steelwood	1	Baldwin County	36551	
Steenson Hollow	1	Colbert County	35661	
Steiner	1	Montgomery County		
Stemley	1	Talladega County		
Stems	1	Shelby County		
Steppville	1	Cullman County	35077	
Sterrett	1	Shelby County	35147	
Stevenson	1	Jackson County	35772	
Stewards Store	1	Limestone County		
Stewart	1	Hale County	35441	
Stewarts	1	St. Clair County		
Stewarts Crossroads	1	St. Clair County		
Stewartville	1	Coosa County	35150	
Stills Cross Road	1	Bullock County	36081	
Stills Crossroads	1	Pike County		
Stinson	1	Marion County		
Stinson Hollow	1	Colbert County		
Stockdale	1	Talladega County	36268	
Stockton	1	Baldwin County	36579	
Stokeley	1	Covington County	36420	
Stokes	1	Tuscaloosa County	35456	
Stokley	1	Marengo County		
Stonewall	1	Dallas County		
Stonewall	1	Lee County		
Stoney Point	1	Autauga County	36022	
Stotesville	1	Bibb County	35184	
Stough	1	Fayette County	35555	
Straight Mountain	1	Blount County	35121	
Strata	1	Montgomery County	36072	
Straughn	1	Covington County	36420	
Straven	1	Shelby County		
Strawberry	1	Blount County	35016	
Strickland Crossroads	1	Coosa County		
Stringer	1	Morgan County		
Stroud	1	Chambers County	36855	
Stroups Crossroads	1	Morgan County	35619	
Studdards Crossroads	1	Fayette County	35549	
Sturdivant	1	Tallapoosa County		
Sturkie	1	Chambers County	36862	
Stylon	1	Lauderdale County		
Sublett Mill	1	Madison County		
Sueann	1	Jefferson County		
Sugar Creek	1	Blount County		
Suggsville	1	Clarke County	36482	
Sulligent	1	Lamar County	35586	
Sullivan Crossroads	1	Lauderdale County		
Sulphur Spring	1	Talladega County		
Sulphur Springs	1	Blount County	35079	
Sulphur Springs	1	Calhoun County		
Sulphur Springs	1	Cullman County		
Sulphur Springs	1	DeKalb County	30738	
Sulphur Springs	1	Jackson County		
Sulphur Springs	1	Madison County	35761	
Sumiton	2	Jefferson County	35148	
Sumiton	2	Walker County	35148	
Summer Bluff	1	Jackson County		
Summerdale	1	Baldwin County	36580	
Summerfield	1	Dallas County	36701	
Summerville	1	Mobile County		
Summit	1	Blount County	35031	
Summit	1	Washington County		
Summit Farm	1	Jefferson County		
Sumter	1	Jefferson County		
Sumterville	1	Sumter County	35460	
Sunflower	1	Washington County	36581	
Sunlight	1	Walker County		
Sunny Cove	1	Mobile County		
Sunny Home	1	Marion County		
Sunny South	1	Wilcox County	36769	
Sunset Acres	1	Marshall County		
Sunset Cove	1	Madison County		
Sunset Mill Village	1	Dallas County	36701	
Sun Valley	1	Jefferson County	35215	
Superior	1	Shelby County		
Surginer	1	Marengo County	36754	
Susan Moore	1	Blount County	35952	
Suspension	1	Bullock County		
Suttell Ford	1	DeKalb County		
Suttle	1	Perry County	36701	
Swagg	1	Randolph County		
Swaim	1	Jackson County	35764	
Swancott	1	Limestone County	35758	
Swearengin	1	Marshall County	35768	
Sweet Water	1	Marengo County	36782	
Swift Ford	1	Madison County		
Swink	1	Dallas County		
Sycamore	1	Talladega County	35149	
Sylacauga	1	Talladega County	35150	
Sylvan	1	Tuscaloosa County		
Sylvan Grove	1	Dale County		
Sylvania	1	DeKalb County	35988	
Sylvan Springs	1	Jefferson County	35118	

== T ==
Name of place	Number of counties	Principal county	Lower zip code	Upper zip code
Tabernacleb	1	Coffee County	36351	
Tabernacle	1	Houston County	36303	
Tabor	1	Etowah County	35901	
Tacoa	1	Shelby County		
Tacon	1	Mobile County		
Taff	1	Cherokee County	35973	
Taits Gap	1	Blount County	35121	
Talladega	1	Talladega County	35160	
Talladega Springs	1	Talladega County	35150	
Tallahatta Springs	1	Clarke County	36784	
Tallapoosa City	1	Tallapoosa County	36078	
Tallassee	2	Elmore County	36078	
Tallassee	2	Tallapoosa County	36078	
Tallaweka	1	Elmore County	36078	
Talley	1	Henry County		
Talucah	1	Morgan County	35775	
Tanner	1	Limestone County	35671	
Tanner Crossroads	1	Limestone County	35671	
Tanner Heights	1	Morgan County	35640	
Tanner Williams	1	Mobile County	36587	
Tanyard	1	Bullock County	36061	
Tanyard	1	St. Clair County	35182	
Tarentum	1	Pike County	36010	
Tarpley	1	Jefferson County	35211	
Tarrant	1	Jefferson County	35217	
Tarrant City	1	Jefferson County	35217	
Tarrant Heights	1	Jefferson County	35217	
Tarsus	1	Calhoun County		
Tasso	1	Dallas County	36767	
Tattlersville	1	Clarke County	36524	
Tayloe	1	Perry County		
Taylor	2	Houston County	36301	
Taylor	2	Geneva County	36301	
Taylor	1	Montgomery County		
Taylor Ford	1	DeKalb County		
Taylors Crossroads	1	Randolph County	36274	
Taylorsville	1	Madison County		
Taylorville	1	Tuscaloosa County	35404	
Teals Crossroads	1	Barbour County	36311	
Teasleys Mill	1	Montgomery County	36052	
Tecumseh	1	Cherokee County	30138	
Tecumseh Furnace	1	Cherokee County		
Teddy	1	Escambia County	36426	
Tenant	1	Randolph County	36274	
Ten Broeck	1	DeKalb County	35971	
Tennala	1	Cherokee County	35960	
Tennant	1	Randolph County		
Tennessee Farms	1	Jefferson County	35022	
Tennille	1	Pike County	36010	
Tensaw	1	Baldwin County	36579	
Terese	1	Barbour County	36027	
Terminal Junction	1	Mobile County		
Terry Crossroads	1	Houston County		
Terry Heights	1	Lawrence County		
Terry Heights	1	Madison County		
Terrytown	1	Lawrence County		
Texas	1	Marion County		
Texasville	1	Barbour County	36016	
Thach	1	Limestone County	35620	
Thach	1	Walker County	35501	
Thaddeus	1	Tallapoosa County	36866	
Thames	1	Montgomery County		
Tharin	1	Montgomery County		
Tharptown	1	Franklin County	35653	
Theba	1	Crenshaw County		
The Bottle	1	Lee County		
The Cedars	1	Lauderdale County	35633	
The Highlands	1	Etowah County	35901	
The Highlands	1	Madison County		
Theodore	1	Mobile County	36582	
The Ridge	1	Monroe County	36460	
Thermal	1	Jefferson County		
Thomas	1	Jefferson County		
Thomas Acres	1	Jefferson County	35023	
Thomas Crossroad	1	Pike County		
Thomas Hill	1	Talladega County	35150	
Thomas Junction	1	Jefferson County		
Thomaston	1	Marengo County	36783	
Thomasville	1	Clarke County	36784	
Thompson	1	Bullock County	36089	
Thorin	1	Montgomery County		
Thornhill	1	Greene County		
Thorn Hill	1	Marion County	35565	
Thornton	1	Lauderdale County		
Thornton	1	Tallapoosa County	36853	
Thornton Springs	1	Choctaw County		
Thorntontown	1	Lauderdale County	35652	
Thorsby	1	Chilton County	35171	
Thrasher Crossroads	1	Cullman County		
Three Forks	1	Madison County		
Three Forks	1	Tuscaloosa County		
Three Notch	1	Bullock County	36053	
Three Notches	1	Mobile County	36619	
Threet	1	Lauderdale County	35617	
Thurston	1	Geneva County	36340	
Tibbie	1	Washington County	36583	
Tiger Mines	1	Walker County		
Tilden	1	Dallas County	36761	
Till	1	Butler County	36033	
Tiller Crossroads	1	Chambers County	36850	
Tillery Crossroads	1	Lee County	36872	
Tillmans Corner	1	Mobile County	36619	
Tinela	1	Monroe County	36481	
Tishabee	1	Greene County		
Titus	1	Elmore County	36080	
Toadvine	1	Jefferson County	35023	
Toddtown	1	Clarke County	36451	
Tohopeka	1	Tallapoosa County		
Toinette	1	Washington County		
Tompkinsville	1	Choctaw County	36916	
Toney	1	Madison County	35773	
Toonersville	1	Lauderdale County	35652	
Topton	1	Washington County		
Toulminville	1	Mobile County		
Town Creek	1	Lawrence County	35672	
Townley	1	Walker County	35587	
Townsend Crossroads	1	DeKalb County		
Toxey	1	Choctaw County	36921	
Trace Ford	1	Lawrence County		
Trade	1	Cullman County	35053	
Trafford	1	Jefferson County	35172	
Trammel Crossroads	1	Chambers County		
Trammells	1	Talladega County		
Travelers Rest	1	Coosa County		
Travilla	1	Tuscaloosa County		
Travis Bridge	1	Conecuh County	36401	
Tredegar	1	Calhoun County	36265	
Trenton	1	Jackson County	35774	
Triana	1	Madison County	35758	
Trickem	1	Cleburne County		
Trickem	1	Lowndes County		
Trimble	1	Cullman County	35055	
Trinity	1	Calhoun County		
Trinity	1	Morgan County	35673	
Trio	1	Bibb County		
Trotwood Park	1	Jefferson County		
Troy	1	Pike County	36081	
Truett	1	Tallapoosa County		
Trussville	2	Jefferson County	35173	
Trussville	2	St. Clair County	35173	
Tuckabatchie	1	Elmore County	36078	
Tuckahoe Heights	1	Etowah County		
Tucker	1	Marion County		
Tucker Crossroads	1	Cherokee County	35959	
Tuckersburg	1	Chambers County		
Tullis	1	Barbour County		
Tulse	1	Shelby County		
Tumbleton	1	Henry County	36345	
Tumlin Gap	1	Etowah County		
Tunnel Springs	1	Monroe County	36471	
Tupelo	1	Jackson County	35768	
Turkestan	1	Monroe County	36753	
Turkey Branch	1	Baldwin County	36555	
Turkey Town	1	Etowah County	35901	
Turnbough Town	1	St. Clair County		
Turnbull	1	Monroe County		
Turner	1	Shelby County		
Turner	1	Talladega County		
Turner Crossroads	1	Coffee County	36351	
Turney Crossroads	1	Morgan County		
Tuscaloosa	1	Tuscaloosa County	35401	87
Tuscaloosa Municipal Airport	1	Tuscaloosa County	35404	
Tuscumbia	1	Colbert County	35674	
Tuskegee	1	Macon County	36083	
Tuskegee Institute	1	Macon County	36088	
Tuskegee Institute National Historic Site	1	Macon County	36088	
Twilley Town	1	Walker County		
Twin	1	Marion County	35563	
Twinsprings	1	Barbour County	36027	
Tyler	1	Dallas County	36785	
Tyler Crossroads	1	Barbour County	36048	
Tyler Ford	1	Coosa County		
Tyson	1	Lowndes County	36043	
Tysonville	1	Macon County	36075	

== U ==
Name of place	Number of counties	Principal county	Lower zip code	Upper zip code
Uchee	1	Russell County	36860	
Uhland	1	Russell County		
Underwood	1	Lauderdale County	35633	
Underwood	1	Shelby County	35115	
Underwood Crossroads	1	Colbert County	35646	
Underwood-Petersville	1	Lauderdale County		
Uniform	1	Washington County		
Union	1	Clay County		
Union	1	Etowah County	35957	
Union	1	Greene County	35462	
Union	1	Henry County	36310	
Union	1	Morgan County	35670	
Union	1	Tallapoosa County	36853	
Union Academy	1	Coffee County	36330	
Union Chapel	1	Walker County		
Union Church	1	Mobile County		
Union Grove	1	Chilton County	35085	
Union Grove	1	Cullman County	35083	
Union Grove	1	Jefferson County		
Union Grove	1	Madison County		
Union Grove	1	Marshall County	35175	
Union Hill	1	Chambers County		
Union Hill	1	Cleburne County	36264	
Union Hill	1	Cullman County		
Union Hill	1	Limestone County	35610	
Union Hill	1	Morgan County	35622	
Union Springs	1	Bullock County	36089	
Uniontown	1	Perry County	36786	
Unity	1	Coosa County	35183	
Unity	1	Tuscaloosa County	35404	
Universal Heights	1	Tuscaloosa County	35404	
University	1	Tuscaloosa County	35486	
University of Montevallo	1	Shelby County	35115	
University of South Alabama	1	Mobile County	36688	
Upper Coalburg	1	Jefferson County	35068	
Upper Green Hill	1	Lauderdale County		
Upshaw	1	Winston County	35540	
Upton	1	Etowah County		
Uptown	1	Jefferson County	35023	
Uriah	1	Monroe County	36480	

== V ==
Name of place	Number of counties	Principal county	Lower zip code	Upper zip code
Vaiden	1	Perry County		
Valdosta	1	Colbert County	35674	
Valhalla	1	Jefferson County		
Valhermoso Springs	1	Morgan County	35775	
Vallegrande	1	Dallas County	36701	
Valley	1	Chambers County	36854	
Valley Creek	1	Jefferson County	35023	
Valley Creek Junction	1	Dallas County		
Valley Grande	1	Dallas County		
Valley Head	1	DeKalb County	35989	
Valley of Shiloh	1	Covington County		
Valley View	1	Morgan County		
Vance	2	Tuscaloosa County	35490	
Vance	2	Bibb County	35490	
Vanderbilt	1	Jefferson County		
Vandiver	1	Shelby County	35176	
Vangale	1	Marengo County	36782	
Vanlandingham Mill	1	Geneva County		
Varnons	1	Shelby County		
Vashti	1	Clarke County		
Vaughn	1	Baldwin County	36579	
Vaughn Corners	1	Madison County		
Verbena	1	Chilton County	36091	
Verlie	1	Shelby County		
Vernledge	1	Crenshaw County	36049	
Vernon	1	Lamar County	35592	
Vernontown	1	Bibb County	35184	
Vertagreen	1	Colbert County		
Vestavia Hills	2	Jefferson County	35216	
Vestavia Hills	2	Shelby County	35216	
Vesthaven	1	Jefferson County	35216	
Veterans Administration Facility	1	Macon County	36083	
Veterans Hospital	1	Tuscaloosa County	35404	
Veto	1	Limestone County	35620	
Vick	1	Bibb County		
Victoria	1	Coffee County	36346	
Vida	1	Autauga County	36067	
Vida Junction	1	Autauga County		
Vidette	1	Crenshaw County	36049	
Vienna	1	Pickens County		
Viewpoint	1	DeKalb County	35963	
Vigo	1	Calhoun County	36272	
Village Creek	1	Jefferson County		
Village Number 1	1	Colbert County		
Village Springs	2	Blount County	35126	
Village Springs	2	Jefferson County	35126	
Villula	1	Russell County	36871	
Vilula	1	Perry County		
Vina	1	Franklin County	35593	
Vincent	3	St. Clair County	35178	
Vincent	3	Shelby County	35178	
Vincent	3	Talladega County	35178	
Vinegar Bend	1	Washington County	36584	
Vine Hill	1	Autauga County	36758	
Vineland	1	Marengo County	36784	
Vineland Park	1	Jefferson County	35023	
Vinemont	1	Cullman County	35179	
Vines Mill	1	Jefferson County		
Vinesville	1	Jefferson County		
Vinnette	1	Calhoun County	36201	
Virginia	1	Jefferson County	35023	
Virginia Shores	1	Colbert County	35661	
Vocation	1	Monroe County	36502	
Volanta	1	Baldwin County	36532	
Vredenburgh	1	Monroe County	36481	
Vulcan	1	Jefferson County		
Vulcan City	1	Jefferson County		

== W ==
Name of place	Number of counties	Principal county	Lower zip code	Upper zip code
Waco	1	Franklin County	35653	
Wacoochee Valley	1	Lee County		
Wadley	1	Randolph County	36276	
Wadsworth	1	Autauga County	36022	
Wadsworth	1	Autauga County		
Wagar	1	Washington County	36585	
Wagarville	1	Washington County	36585	
Wahl	1	Escambia County		
Wahouma	1	Jefferson County		
Wainwright	1	Monroe County		
Walco	1	Talladega County	35150	
Wald	1	Butler County		
Walden Quarters	1	Greene County		
Waldo	1	Talladega County	35160	
Walker Chapel	1	Jefferson County	35068	
Walker Mill Ford	1	Jackson County		
Walkers Corner	1	Cullman County	35055	
Walker Springs	1	Clarke County	36586	
Walkerton	1	St. Clair County	35125	
Wallace	1	Escambia County	36426	
Walley	1	Washington County	35179	
Wallsboro	1	Elmore County	36092	
Wallsburg	1	Elmore County	36092	
Wallstown	1	Blount County		
Wall Street	1	Limestone County	35758	
Walnut Grove	1	Etowah County	35990	
Walnut Grove	1	Jefferson County	35228	
Walnut Hill	1	Tallapoosa County	36853	
Walnut Park	1	Etowah County		
Walter	1	Cullman County	35077	
Wannville	1	Jackson County	35752	
Ward	1	Sumter County	36922	
Wards Mill	1	Chambers County		
Ware	1	Elmore County	36078	
Ware	1	Jefferson County		
Warley	1	Mobile County		
Warrenton	1	Marshall County	35976	
Warrior	1	Jefferson County	35180	
Warriorstand	1	Macon County	36089	
Warsaw	1	Sumter County	35477	
Washington	1	Autauga County		
Washington Heights	1	Jefferson County		
Waterford	1	Dale County	36352	
Waterloo	1	Lauderdale County	35677	
Waterloo Springs	1	Cherokee County		
Water Valley	1	Choctaw County	36908	
Watkins	1	Shelby County		
Watson	1	Cherokee County	35973	
Watson	1	Jefferson County	35181	
Watsonville	1	Wilcox County	36753	
Watts Crossroads	1	Clay County		
Watts Mill	1	Clay County	36266	
Wattsville	1	St. Clair County	35182	
Waugh	1	Montgomery County	36109	
Waverly	2	Chambers County	36879	
Waverly	2	Lee County	36879	
Wawbeek	1	Escambia County	36502	
Wayne	1	Marengo County	36782	
Weatherly Heights	1	Madison County		
Weathers	1	Clay County		
Weaver	1	Calhoun County	36277	
Webb	1	Houston County	36376	
Webb Addition	1	Jackson County	35768	
Webster Chapel	1	Calhoun County	35901	
Wedgeworth	1	Hale County		
Wedgworth	1	Hale County	36776	
Wedowee	1	Randolph County	36278	
Weed Crossroad	1	Crenshaw County	36009	
Weeden Heights	1	Lauderdale County	35633	
Weeks	1	Geneva County	36453	
Weems	1	Jefferson County		
Wegra	1	Walker County	35129	
Wehadkee	1	Randolph County	36274	
Welch	1	Chambers County		
Welka	1	Escambia County		
Weller	1	Jefferson County		
Wellington	1	Calhoun County	36279	
Wells Ford	1	Jackson County		
Welona	1	Coosa County		
Welti	1	Cullman County	35055	
Wende	1	Russell County	36860	
Wenonah	1	Jefferson County	35211	
Weogufka	1	Coosa County	35183	
Weoka	1	Elmore County	36092	
Weoka Mills	1	Elmore County		
Wesoda	1	Cullman County		
Wessington	1	Chilton County	35040	
West	1	Madison County	35805	
West Alexandria	1	Calhoun County	36250	
West Anniston	1	Calhoun County	36203	
West Bend	1	Clarke County	36524	
West Birmingham	1	Jefferson County		
West Blocton	1	Bibb County	35184	
West Boylston	1	Montgomery County		
Westbrook	1	Dallas County		
West Butler	1	Choctaw County		
West Corona	1	Walker County		
West Decatur	1	Morgan County	35601	
West End	1	Calhoun County	36203	
West End	1	Jefferson County	35211	
West End	1	Montgomery County		
West End Anniston	1	Calhoun County	36203	
West End-Cobb Town	1	Calhoun County		
West Ensley	1	Jefferson County	35224	
Western Hills	1	Mobile County	36608	
Western Hills Estates	1	Madison County		
Western Railway Junction	1	Dallas County		
West Fairfield	1	Jefferson County	35228	
Westfield	1	Jefferson County		
West Greene	1	Greene County	35491	
West Highlands	1	Jefferson County	35023	
West Huntsville	1	Madison County		
West Jefferson	1	Jefferson County	35130	
West Lake Highlands	1	Jefferson County	35023	
Westlawn	1	Madison County		
West Monroeville	1	Monroe County	36460	
Westmoreland	1	Limestone County		
Weston	1	Marion County	35570	
Westover	1	Shelby County	35185	
West Point	1	Cullman County	35179	
West Point	1	Morgan County		
West Pratt	1	Walker County	35062	
West Sayre	1	Jefferson County	35062	
West Selmont	1	Dallas County	36701	
West Side	1	Jefferson County	35023	
West Side	1	Montgomery County	36108	
West Wellington	1	Calhoun County	36279	
Westwood	1	Jefferson County	35214	
Wetumpka	1	Elmore County	36092	
Whatley	1	Clarke County	36482	
Whatley Cross Road	1	Lee County		
Wheat	1	Cullman County	35053	
Wheeler	1	Lawrence County	35618	
Wheeler Dam Village	1	Lawrence County		
Wheelerville	1	Mobile County		
Wheeling Crossroad	1	Jefferson County		
Whistler	1	Mobile County	36612	
White City	1	Autauga County	36056	
White City	1	Cullman County	35077	
White Crossroads	1	Randolph County		
White Hall	1	Lowndes County	36040	
Whitehead	1	Lauderdale County	35652	
Whitehouse	1	Marion County	35565	
Whitehouse Forks	1	Baldwin County	36507	
White House Springs	1	Colbert County		
White Oak	1	Barbour County		
Whiteoak	1	Colbert County	35646	
White Oak	1	Franklin County		
White Oak	1	Henry County	36310	
White Oak	1	Marshall County	35950	
White Plains	1	Calhoun County	36203	
White Plains	1	Chambers County	36862	
Whites Bluff	1	Dallas County	36767	
Whitesboro	1	Etowah County	35957	
Whitesburg	1	Madison County	35802	
Whitesburg Estates	1	Madison County		
Whites Chapel	1	St. Clair County	35173	
Whites Gap	1	Calhoun County	36265	
Whiteside	1	Limestone County		
Whitesides Mill	1	Calhoun County		
White Signboard Crossroad	1	Randolph County	36274	
Whitesville	1	Marshall County	35957	
Whitewater	1	Autauga County		
Whitfield	1	Sumter County	36925	
Whitney	1	St. Clair County	35991	
Whitney Junction	1	St. Clair County		
Whiton	1	DeKalb County	35962	
Whitsitt	1	Hale County		
Whitson	1	Tuscaloosa County	35404	
Who'd A Thought It	1	Jefferson County		
Whorton	1	Cherokee County	35960	
Wicksburg	1	Houston County	36352	
Wiggins	1	Covington County	36420	
Wigginsville	1	Limestone County	35611	
Wiginton	1	Marion County	35564	
Wilburn	1	Cullman County	35033	
Wilcox	1	Conecuh County		
Wildwood	1	Randolph County		
Wiley	1	Montgomery County		
Wiley	1	Tuscaloosa County		
Wilhites	1	Morgan County		
Wilkes	1	Jefferson County	35228	
Wilkinstown	1	Coffee County	36081	
Williams	1	Etowah County		
Williams	1	Houston County		
Williams	1	Sumter County		
Williamstown	1	Walker County		
Willowbrook	1	Madison County	35802	
Willowbrook Estates	1	Madison County		
Willow Springs	1	Elmore County	36092	
Wills Crossroads	1	Henry County	36310	
Wills Valley	1	DeKalb County		
Wilmer	1	Mobile County	36587	
Wilson Bend	1	Winston County		
Wilson Dam	2	Colbert County	35661	
Wilson Dam	2	Lauderdale County	35661	
Wilsonia	1	Etowah County		
Wilson Lake Shores	1	Colbert County	35661	
Wilson Quarters	1	Houston County		
Wilsonville	1	Shelby County	35186	
Wilton	1	Shelby County	35187	
Wimberly	1	Choctaw County	36921	
Winburn	1	Shelby County		
Windham Springs	1	Tuscaloosa County	35546	
Windsor Highlands	1	Jefferson County	35229	
Winetka	1	Jefferson County		
Winfield	2	Fayette County	35594	
Winfield	2	Marion County	35594	
Wing	1	Covington County	36483	
Wingard	1	Pike County	36001	
Wininger	1	Jackson County		
Winn	1	Clarke County	36545	
Winn Crossroads	1	Morgan County		
Winninger	1	Jackson County	35776	
Winslow	1	Autauga County	36003	
Winterboro	1	Talladega County	35014	
Winton	1	Morgan County	35670	
Wolf Creek	1	St. Clair County	35125	
Wolf Springs	1	Lawrence County	35672	
Wolftown	1	Morgan County		
Womack Hill	1	Choctaw County	36908	
Woodaire Estates	1	Jefferson County	35215	
Woodbluff	1	Clarke County	36727	
Woodcrest	1	Jefferson County		
Wooddale	1	Shelby County	35244	
Woodfin Mill	1	Limestone County		
Woodford	1	Sumter County	35450	
Woodland	1	Lauderdale County		
Woodland	1	Macon County	36866	
Woodland	1	Randolph County	36280	
Woodland Mills	1	Morgan County		
Woodlawn	1	Jefferson County	35212	
Woodlawn Heights	1	Franklin County	35653	
Woodlawn Heights	1	Jefferson County		
Woodlawn Junction	1	Jefferson County		
Woodley Park	1	Montgomery County		
Woodmeadow	1	Jefferson County	35216	
Woodmont	1	Jefferson County	35023	
Woods Bluff	1	Clarke County		
Woodstock	1	Bibb County	35188	
Woodville	1	Jackson County	35776	
Woodward	1	Jefferson County	35023	
Woodward Junction	1	Jefferson County		
Woodward Red Ore	1	Jefferson County		
Woolfolk	1	Talladega County	36268	
Wren	1	Lawrence County	35650	
Wright	1	Lauderdale County	35677	
Wright Crossroads	1	Lee County		
Wyatt	1	Walker County	35130	
Wylam	1	Jefferson County	35224	
Wylaunee	1	Barbour County		
Wynnville	1	Blount County	35952	

== Y ==
Name of place	Number of counties	Principal county	Lower zip code	Upper zip code
Yampertown	1	Marion County		
Yantley	1	Choctaw County	36912	
Yarbo	1	Washington County	36558	
Yarbrough	1	Lee County		
Yelling Settlement	1	Baldwin County	36526	
Yellow Bluff	1	Wilcox County	36769	
Yellow Creek Falls	1	Cherokee County	35959	
Yellowleaf	1	Shelby County	35186	
Yellow Pine	1	Washington County	36539	
Yerkwood	1	Walker County		
Yolande	1	Tuscaloosa County		
York	1	Sumter County	36925	
Yorks Mill	1	DeKalb County		
Youngblood	1	Pike County	36081	
Youngs Chapel	1	Etowah County	35901	
Youngtown	1	Lawrence County		
Yucca	1	Jackson County		
Yupon	1	Baldwin County	36555	
