= Columbia, Alabama =

- Town
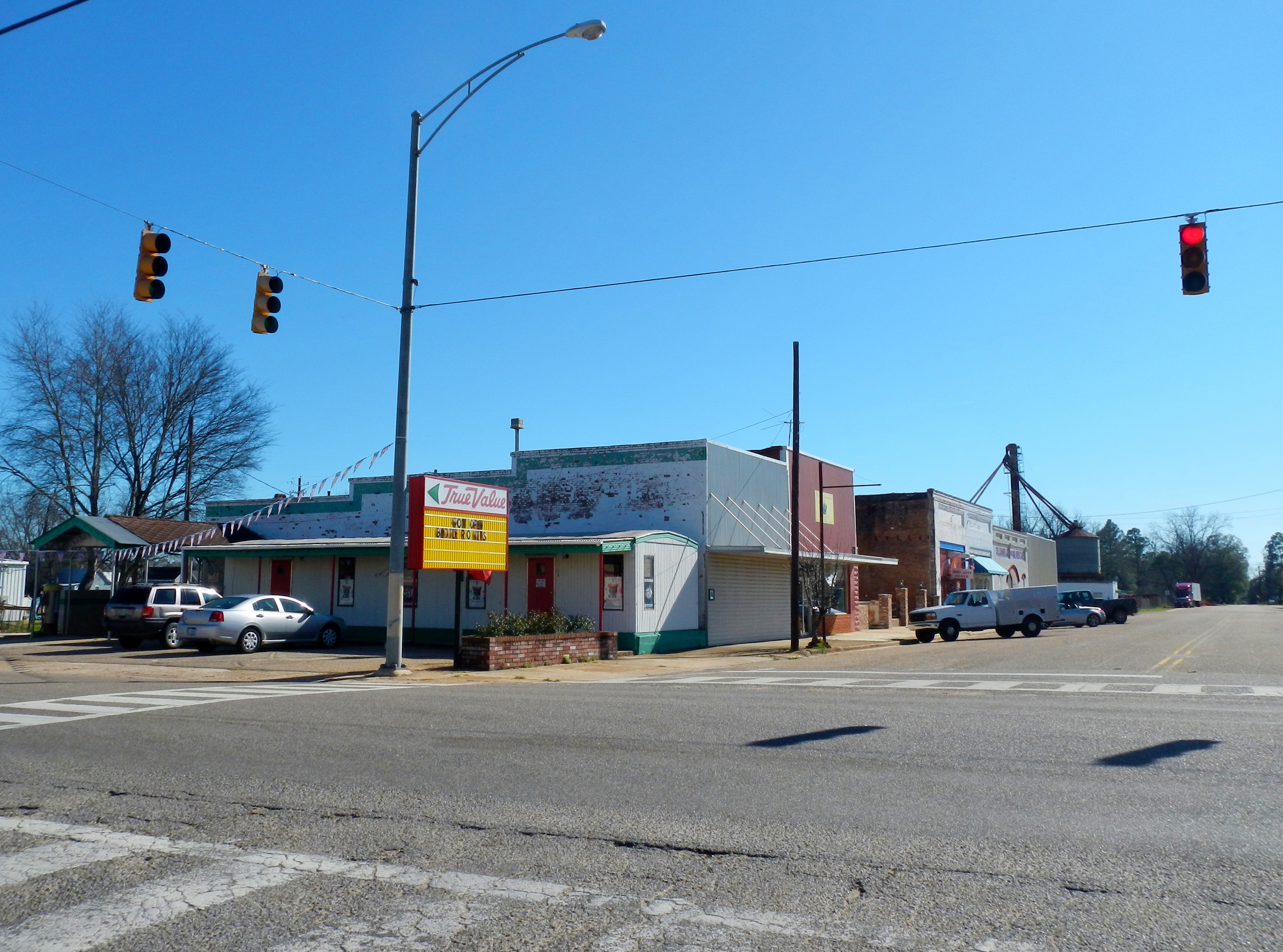
- Columbia, Alabama in 2012

- Location of Columbia in Houston County, Alabama.
- Coordinates: 31°17′32″N 85°6′43″W
- Country: United States
- State: Alabama
- County: Houston

Area
  - Total: 4.00 sq mi (10.35 km^{2})
  - Land: 3.93 sq mi (10.18 km^{2})
  - Water: 0.066 sq mi (0.17 km^{2})
- Elevation: 223 ft (68 m)

Population (2020)
  - Total: 690
  - Density: 175.5/sq mi (67.77/km^{2})
- Time zone: UTC-6 (Central (CST))
  - Summer (DST): UTC-5 (CDT)
- ZIP code: 36319
- Area code: 334
- FIPS code: 01-16744
- GNIS feature ID: 0116457

Columbia is a rural town in Houston County, Alabama, United States. It is part of the Dothan, Alabama Metropolitan Statistical Area. As of the 2020 census, Columbia had a population of 690.

== History ==
Founded in 1820, Columbia served as a major trading center for communities throughout the Wiregrass Region of Alabama between 1822 and 1833, which coincided as its time as Henry County seat. Henry County which then comprised portions of present-day Covington, Dale, Barbour, Coffee, Crenshaw, Bullock, Geneva, and Houston counties. It lost the county seat status to Abbeville in 1833.

Bordering the State of Georgia and the Chattahoochee River, Columbia was a major port-of-call for steamboats and was known to many as "Old Columbia". The town was incorporated on April 29, 1880 and was the center of education, culture, commerce, and trade. Columbia was the largest town in the area during the 19th century and remains one of the area's oldest continuously operating municipalities.

Columbia received its first cotton textile mill in 1891 and its first electric plant in 1892. A branch of the Henry County Courthouse was located here from 1889 until Columbia became part of Houston County in 1903. Columbia got electric street lights in 1900 and its first electric utility company in 1914.

At the turn of the 20th century, Columbia was bypassed by the Alabama Midland Railway in favor of Dothan. As the railroads continued to take freight trade away from the riverboats. Columbia's position as a principal trade center began to decline; however, Columbia sustained itself as a thriving farming community through the mid-20th century.

=== Old Columbia Jail ===
Erected sometime in the early 1860s, the Old Columbia Jail is today one of the last wooden jails still standing in Alabama. Originally, there were two cells, each measuring 10x15 feet. Interior walls are studded every two inches with iron spikes to prevent prisoners from being able to escape. The Columbia Women's Club and the Columbia Bicentennial Committee have completely renovated the building for use as a museum to preserve some of the articles of historical interest to Columbia citizens.

=== Purcell-Killingsworth House ===
The Purcell-Killingsworth House, also known as "Traveler's Rest", was completed in 1890 by William Henry Purcell (1845–1910), a prominent Columbia business man and politician. Purcell had many business interests including a steamboat landing on the Chattahoochee River. This was the boyhood home of Bishop Clare Purcell (1884–1964) who, in 1955, was elected President of the United Methodist Council of Bishops, the highest place of recognition ever achieved by a native-born Alabama Methodist minister. In 1946, the Purcell Family sold the two acre homestead to Mr. & Mrs. Henry Killingsworth who have meticulously restored this imposing Victorian mansion. It was placed on the National Register of Historic Places on December 16, 1982.

== Geography ==
Columbia is located in the northeastern corner of Houston County on the Georgia-Alabama state line along Alabama State Routes 52 and 95. AL-52 is the main east–west route through the town, leading east 1 mi (1.6 km) to the Georgia state line, and west 10 mi (16 km) to Webb. AL-95 begins in the town and leads north 23 mi (37 km) to Abbeville. Alabama State Route 134 also begins in the town, leading west 17 mi (27 km) to Headland.

According to the U.S. Census Bureau, the town has a total area of 4.0 square miles (10 km^{2}), of which 3.9 square miles (10 km^{2}) is land and 0.1 square miles (0.26 km^{2}) (1.75%) is water.

== Demographics ==
Historical population
Census	Pop.	Note	%±
1880	290		—
1890	960		231.0%
1900	1,132		17.9%
1910	1,122		−0.9%
1920	860		−23.4%
1930	926		7.7%
1940	829		−10.5%
1950	849		2.4%
1960	783		−7.8%
1970	891		13.8%
1980	881		−1.1%
1990	922		4.7%
2000	804		−12.8%
2010	740		−8.0%
2020	690		−6.8%
U.S. Decennial Census; 2013 Estimate

=== 2020 census ===
Columbia racial composition
Race	Num.	Perc.
White (non-Hispanic)	529	76.67%
Black or African American (non-Hispanic)	117	16.96%
Asian	1	0.14%
Other/Mixed	40	5.8%
Hispanic or Latino	3	0.43%

As of the 2020 United States census, there were 690 people, 343 households, and 192 families residing in the town.

=== 2000 census ===
As of the census of 2000, there were 804 people, 344 households, and 226 families residing in the town. The population density was 204.8 inhabitants per square mile (79.1/km^{2}). There were 462 housing units at an average density of 117.7 per square mile (45.4/km^{2}). The racial makeup of the town was 74.38% White, 24.50% Black or African American, 0.62% Native American, 0.12% from other races, and 0.37% from two or more races. 0.50% of the population were Hispanic or Latino of any race.

There were 344 households, out of which 27.9% had children under the age of 18 living with them, 49.4% were married couples living together, 12.2% had a female householder with no husband present, and 34.3% were non-families. 33.7% of all households were made up of individuals, and 18.9% had someone living alone who was 65 years of age or older. The average household size was 2.34 and the average family size was 2.98.

In the town, the population was spread out, with 25.7% under the age of 18, 6.5% from 18 to 24, 24.0% from 25 to 44, 22.1% from 45 to 64, and 21.6% who were 65 years of age or older. The median age was 41 years. For every 100 females, there were 87.9 males. For every 100 females age 18 and over, there were 84.3 males.

The median income for a household in the town was $27,500, and the median income for a family was $36,339. Males had a median income of $29,821 versus $18,393 for females. The per capita income for the town was $15,248. About 12.3% of families and 18.0% of the population were below the poverty line, including 24.0% of those under age 18 and 18.6% of those age 65 or over.

== Notable people ==
- Dave Edwards, former Auburn University and Dallas Cowboys player
- Monte Irvin, born in Columbia, member of the Baseball Hall of Fame
- B'Ho Kirkland, born in Columbia, played for the Alabama Crimson Tide and the Brooklyn Dodgers (NFL).
- Clare Purcell, Bishop of the Methodist Episcopal Church, South and the Methodist Church.

== Gallery ==
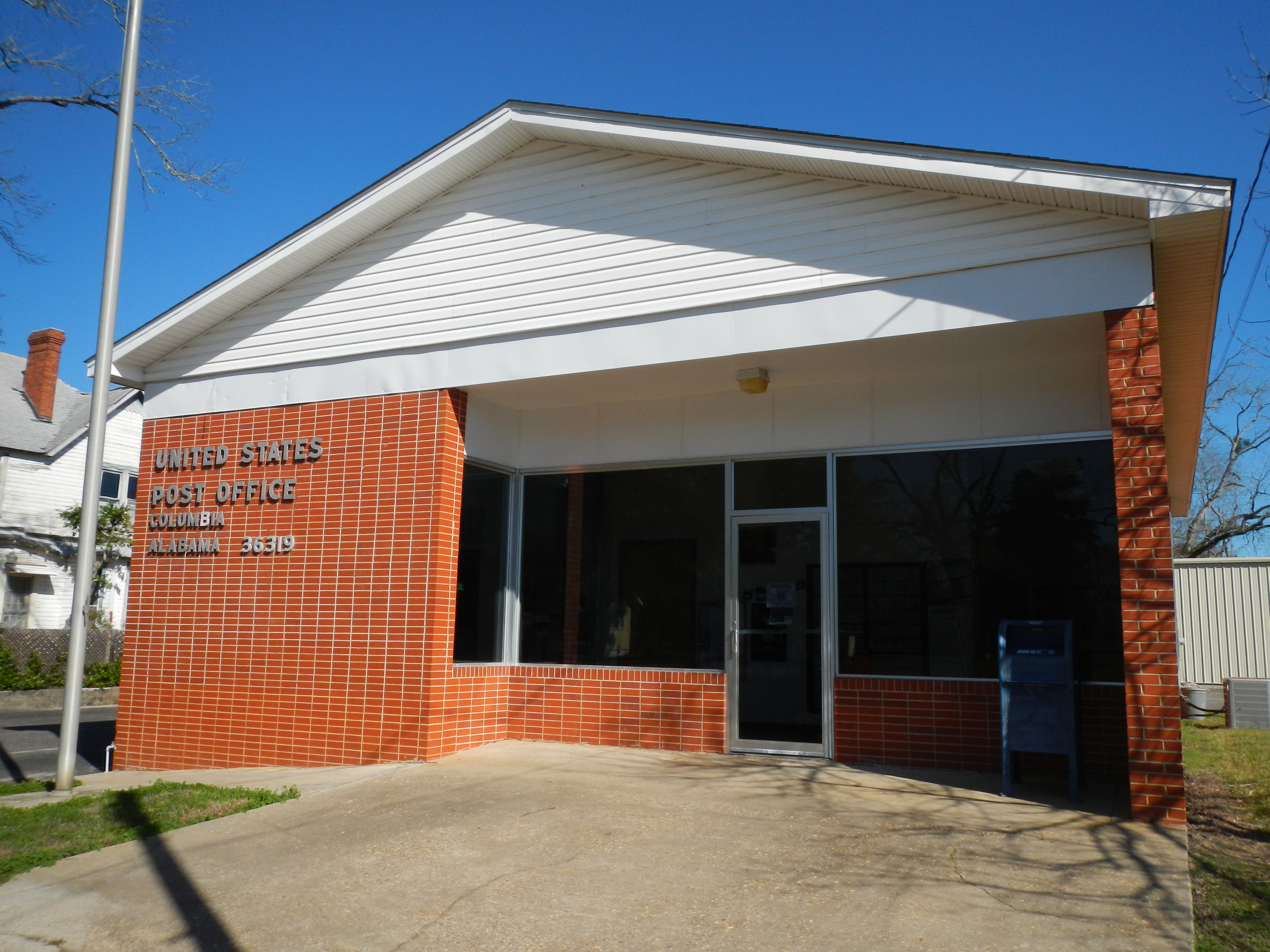
Columbia Post Office (ZIP code: 36319)

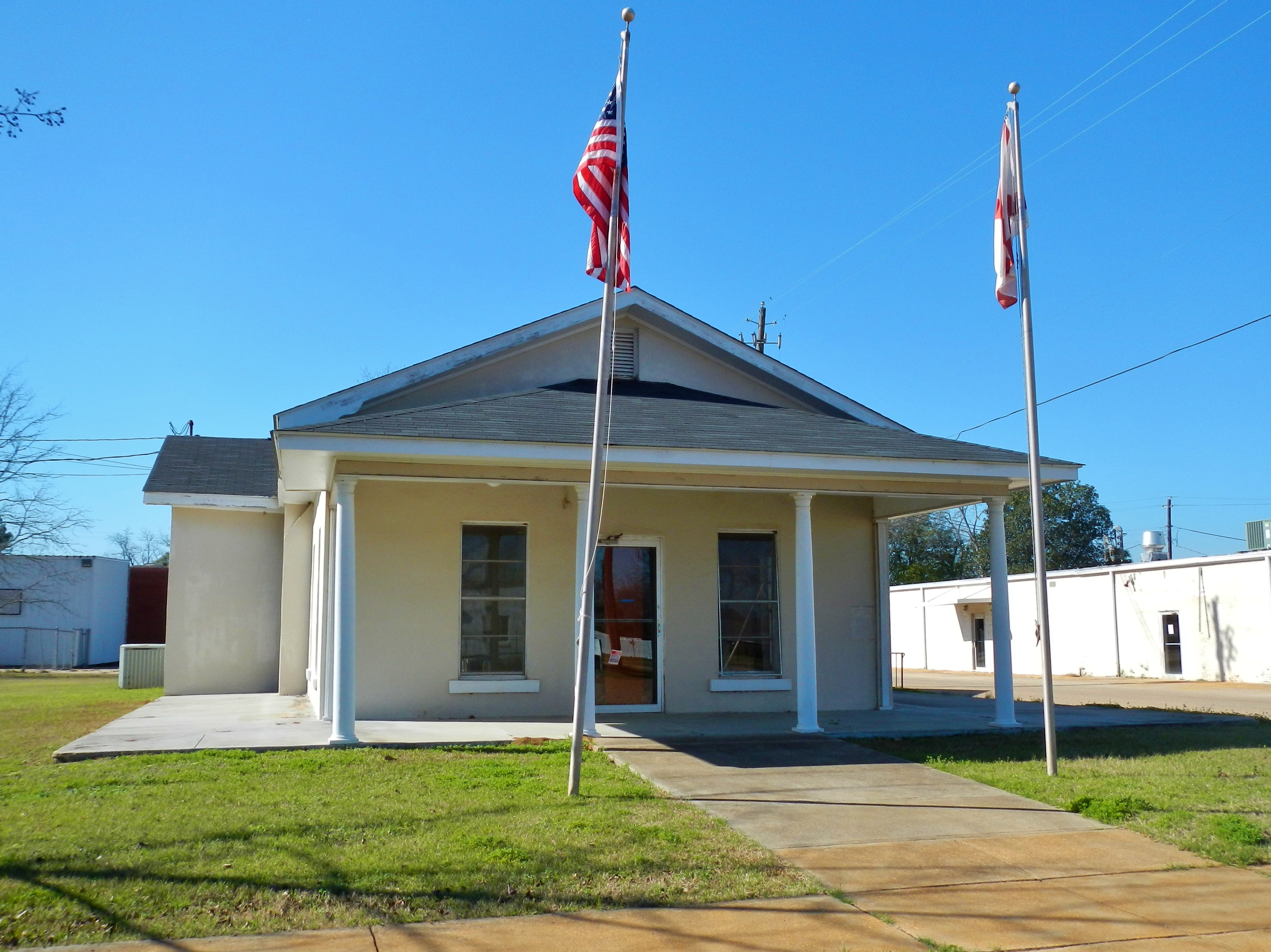
Rossie Purcell Public Library

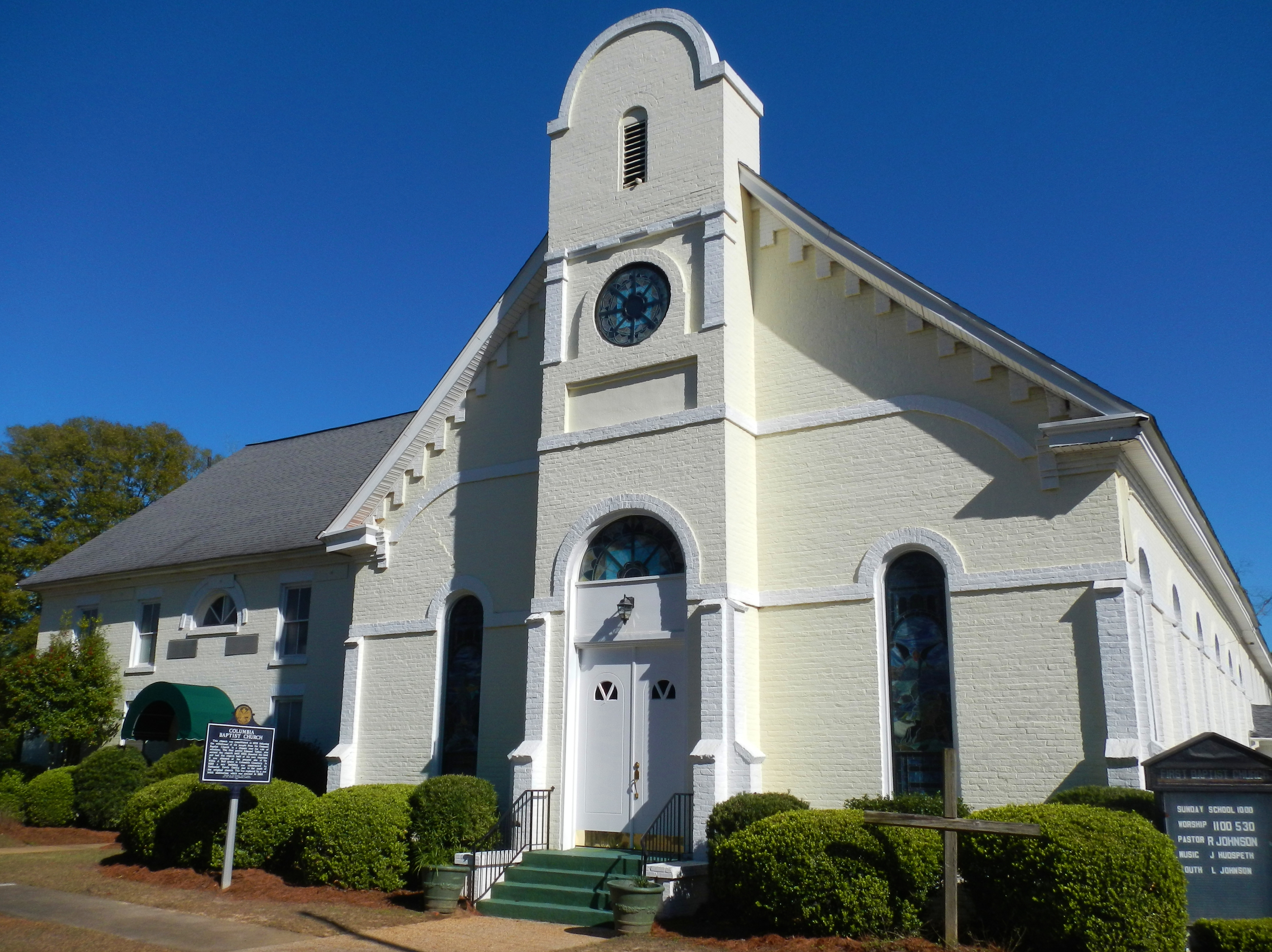
Columbia First Baptist Church

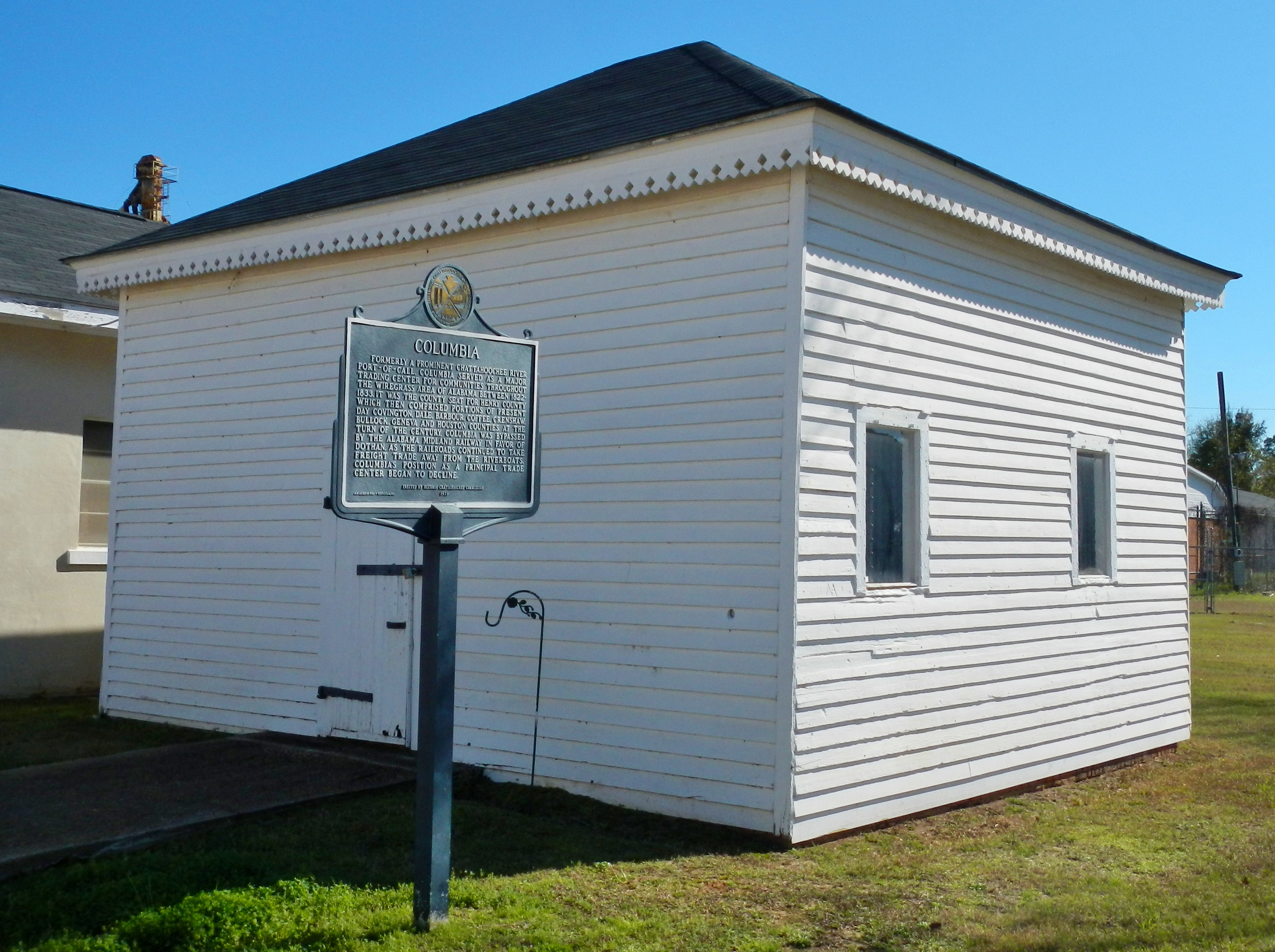
The Old Columbia Jail

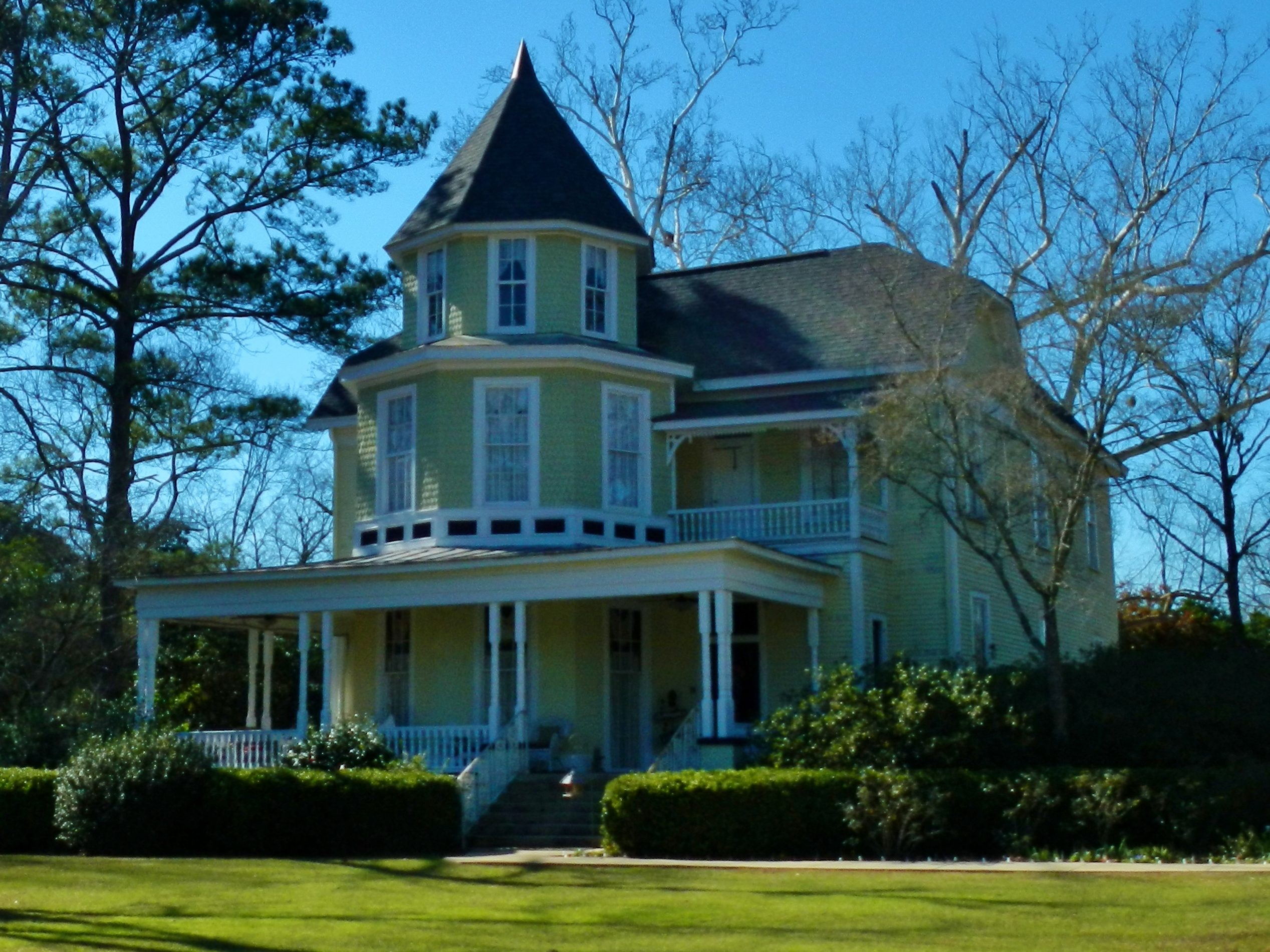
The Purcell-Killingsworth House

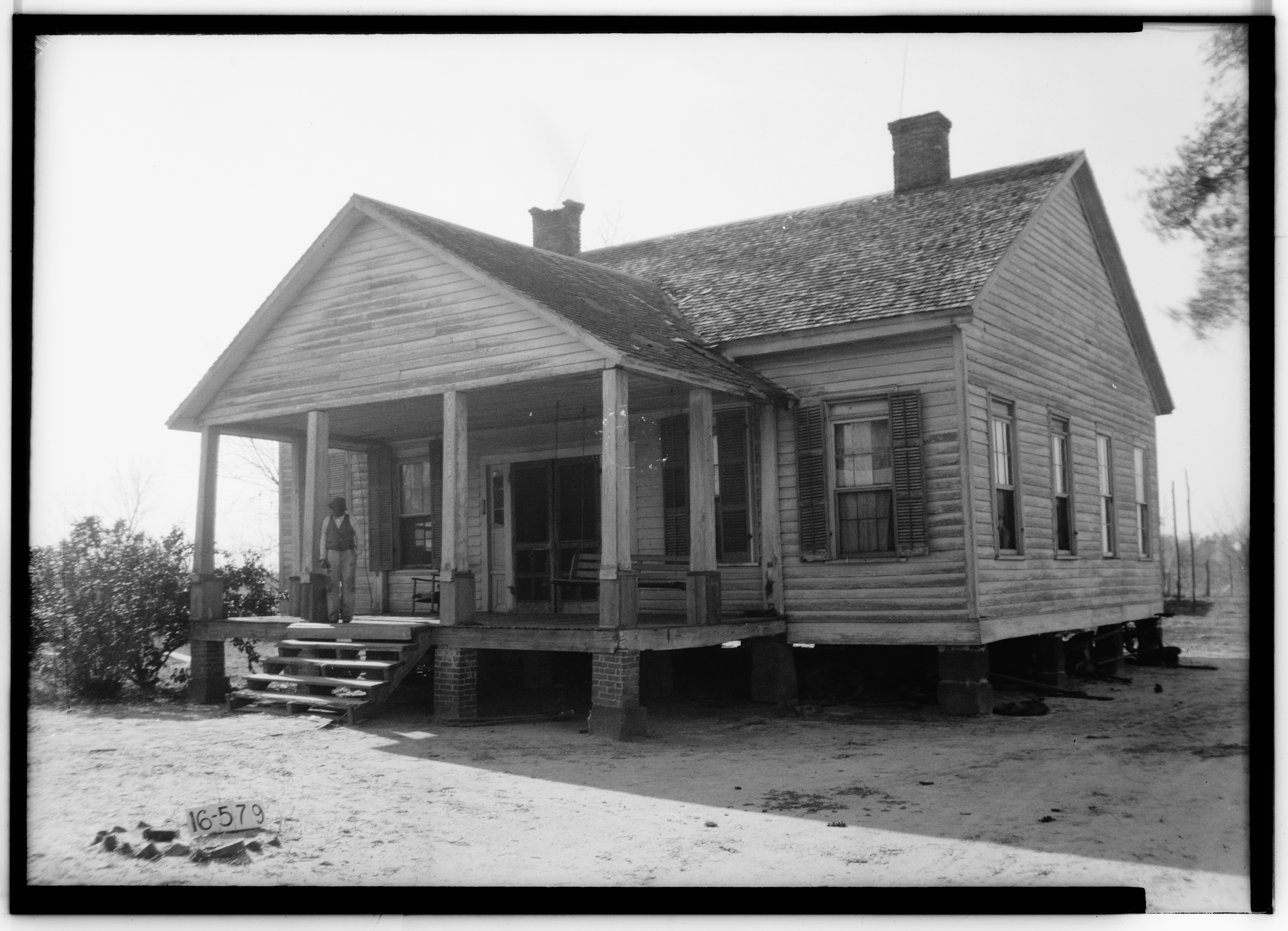
S. M. Dunwoody House. Taken as part of the Historic American Buildings Survey (HABS)

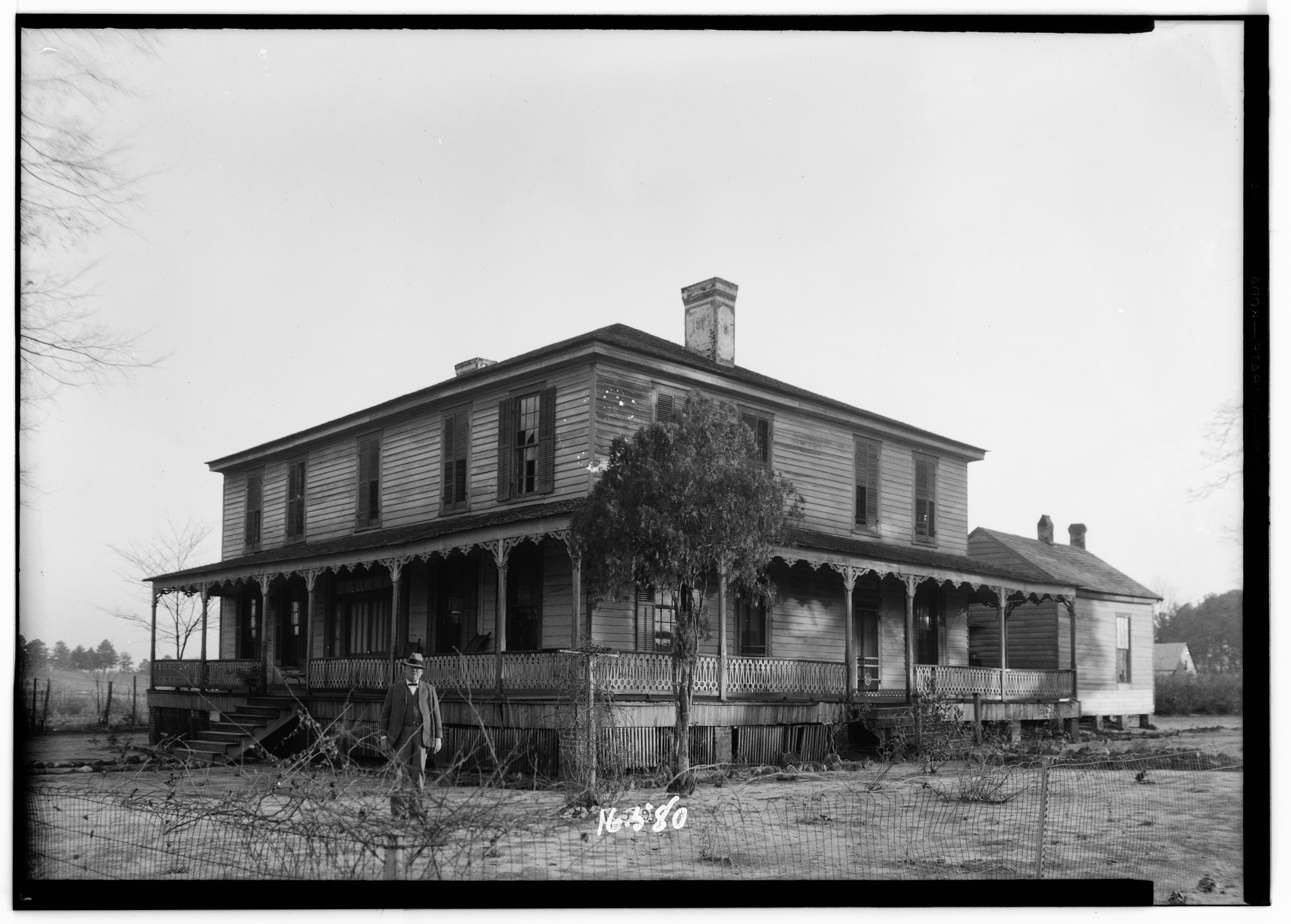
Tom Bowden House. Taken as part of the HABS

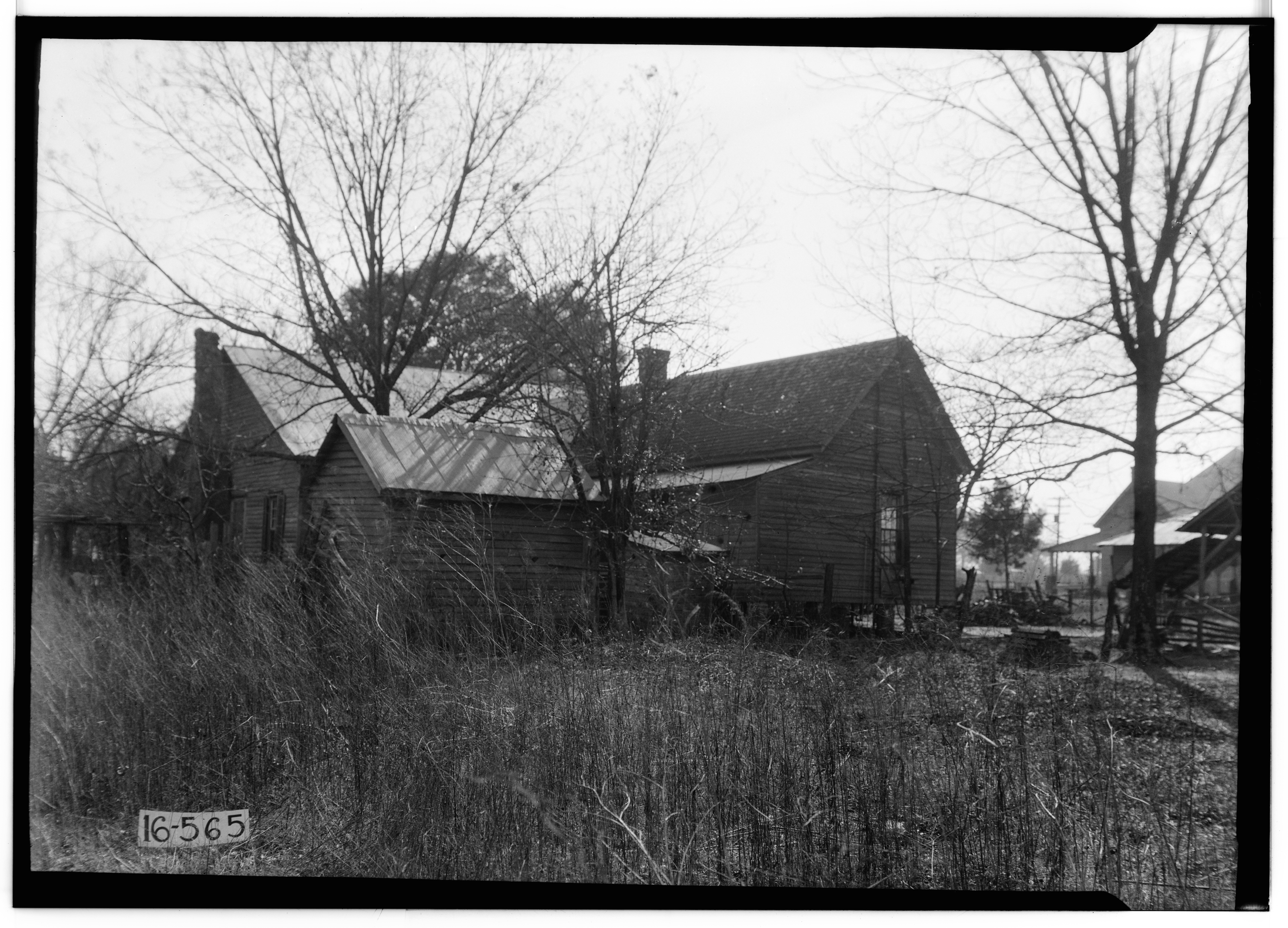
J. B. Taylor House. Taken as part of the HABS

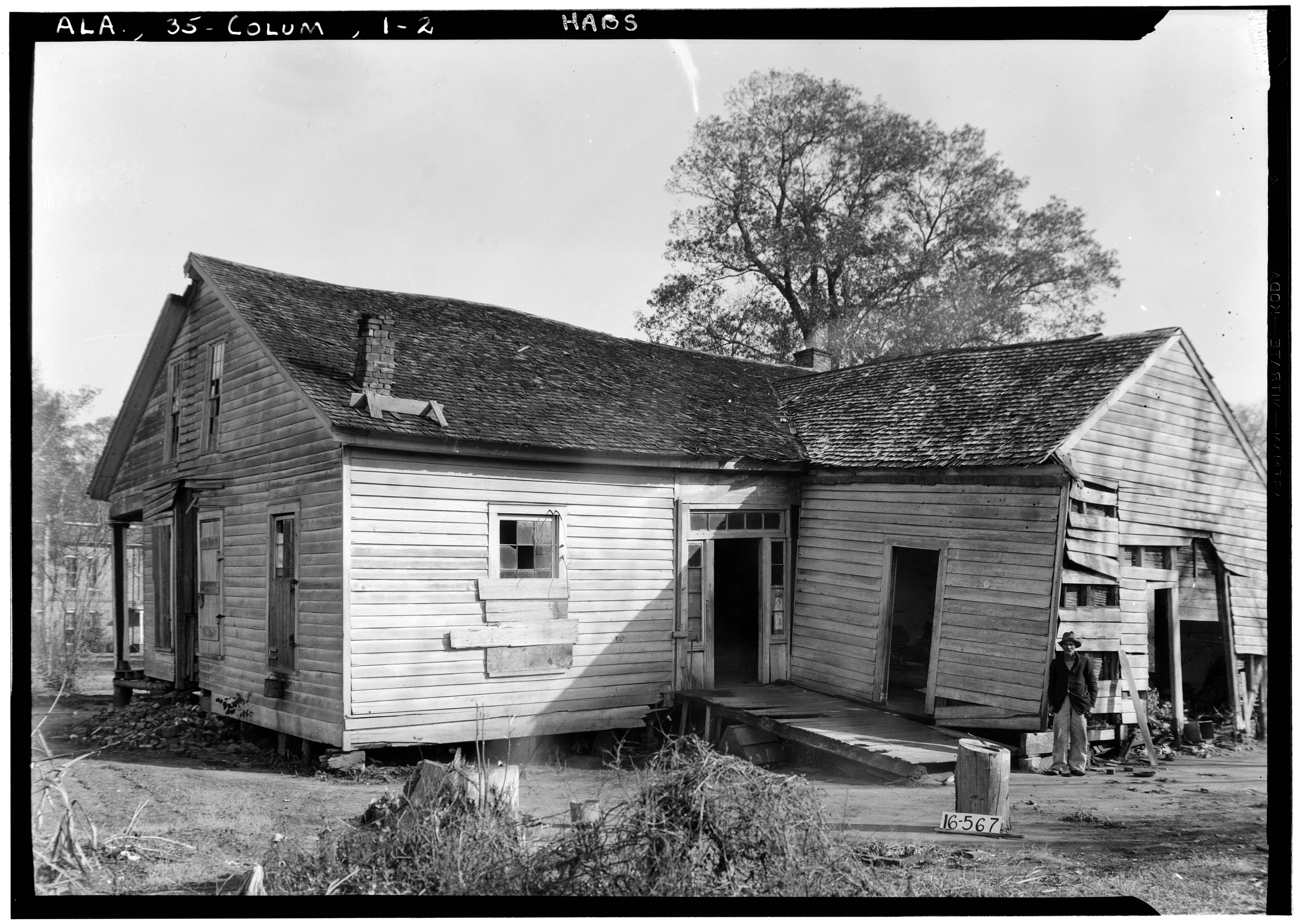
Teague-Regell House. Taken as part of the HABS
