= Perry Matthews =

American politician

Perry Matthews was a teacher and state legislator in Alabama. He represented Bullock County, Alabama in the Alabama House of Representatives from 1872 to 1876.

He was a native of Georgia born in 1849 or 1850.

He signed on to a Memorial by Republican members of the legislature describing election issues and partisan actions by Democrats. He is listed on a historical marker commemorating the service of African American state legislators in Alabama.

== See also ==
- African American officeholders from the end of the Civil War until before 1900
