= South Alabama =

U.S. state geographic region

Coordinates: 31.78°N 86.79°W

South Alabama and Lower Alabama are overlapping, poorly defined terms for various parts of southern Alabama. Although it is not a strictly defined geographic region, it generally includes all Alabama counties south of the Black Belt. In that view, South Alabama consists of just the two counties that border the Gulf of Mexico and Mobile Bay: Baldwin County and Mobile County. That area is characterized by extensive wetlands, but also by long, sandy beaches which are very conducive to tourism. Many deluxe golf courses have been developed in the area in recent decades.

Because Mobile and Baldwin Counties tend to use "South Alabama" with such exclusivity, other parts of southern Alabama, particularly the Florida-border counties from Escambia County over to Houston County often humorously prefer to be called Lower Alabama if a regional name must be given. Traditionally the south central and southeastern parts of the state have less in common with the Mobile area than they have in common with southwest Georgia and the Black Belt region. Alternative names include South Central Alabama, Southeast Alabama, and the Wiregrass.

Because there is no formally defined border, there are three overlapping areas generally referred to as Lower Alabama:

- In the vicinity of Mobile, Alabama, the argument is that it refers only to the southernmost parts of Alabama. This usage insists that it is properly applied only to the two counties which border the Gulf of Mexico and Mobile Bay: Baldwin County and Mobile County. This area is characterized by extensive wetlands, but also by long, sandy beaches which are very conducive to tourism. Many deluxe golf courses have been developed in the area in recent decades. However, this region more commonly takes South Alabama as a better-known name for the region. This is reflected in the name of the University of South Alabama located in Mobile.
- It includes the area all the way up from Troy to all the way south to Mobile.
- Because Mobile and Baldwin Counties tend to use South Alabama with exclusivity, a second use of "Lower Alabama" is to refer to the other parts of southern Alabama, including the Florida-border counties from Escambia County east to Houston County. Traditionally, the south central and southeastern parts of the state are representative of an older era in Alabama. Hence, Lower Alabama, suggests that this region is less wealthy than other parts of the state. It includes the cities of Dothan, Luverne, Troy, Abbeville, Eufaula, and Cowarts. These sections of the state are where jokes are often heard with punch lines of "Yep, I'm from L.A. too: Lower Alabama" (this can be heard in the 1971 James Brown single "Escape-ism.") Further evidence of this region's claim was the "University of Lower Alabama" as one of the considered name changes by Troy State University before it became Troy University.
- Some people in North Alabama refer to Lower Alabama as anywhere below the Cherokee Nation line in Marshall County or any other Upper Alabama county whose water drains to the Tennessee River instead of through the Alabama River watershed.
