= Scottland =

Scottland may refer to:

- Scottland, Alabama, in Bullock County, Alabama, United States
- Scottland, Illinois, an unincorporated community in Edgar County, Illinois, United States
- Scottland F.C., a Zimbabwean football club
- Beethaeven Scottland, (1975–2001), American professional boxer

== See also ==
- Scotland
- Scotland (disambiguation)
