= High Ridge, Alabama =

Unincorporated community in Alabama, United States

- Unincorporated community
- Location within Alabama Location within the United States
- Coordinates: 32°03′46″N 85°53′42″W
- Country: United States
- State: Alabama
- County: Bullock
- Elevation: 640 ft (200 m)
- Time zone: UTC-6 (Central (CST))
  - Summer (DST): UTC-5 (CDT)
- Area code: 334
- GNIS feature ID: 155098

High Ridge is an unincorporated community in Bullock County, Alabama, United States. The community was most likely named for the surrounding geography.

A post office operated under the name High Ridge from 1892 to 1907.

The Berry House, located in High Ridge, was photographed during the Historic American Buildings Survey.

The High Ridge cuesta is named for the community.
