= Fitzpatrick, Alabama =

- Census-designated place and Unincorporated community
- Location of Fitzpatrick in Bullock County, Alabama.
- Coordinates: 32°12′35″N 85°52′29″W
- Country: United States
- State: Alabama
- County: Bullock

Area
  - Total: 4.20 sq mi (10.87 km^{2})
  - Land: 4.16 sq mi (10.78 km^{2})
  - Water: 0.035 sq mi (0.09 km^{2})
- Elevation: 302 ft (92 m)

Population (2020)
  - Total: 79
  - Density: 19.0/sq mi (7.33/km^{2})
- Time zone: UTC-6 (Central (CST))
  - Summer (DST): UTC-5 (CDT)
- ZIP code: 36029
- Area code: 334
- FIPS code: 01-26152
- GNIS feature ID: 2628590

Fitzpatrick is an unincorporated community and census-designated place in Bullock County, Alabama, United States. It first appeared as a CDP in the 2010 census. As of the 2020 census, Fitzpatrick had a population of 79. The community is served by Alabama State Route 110.

== Demographics ==
Historical population
Census	Pop.	Note	%±
1890	357		—
1900	447		25.2%
1910	398		−11.0%
1920	339		−14.8%
2010	83		—
2020	79		−4.8%
U.S. Decennial Census

Fitzpatrick was first listed as a census designated place in the 2010 U.S. census.

Fitzpatrick CDP, Alabama – Racial and ethnic composition Note: the US Census treats Hispanic/Latino as an ethnic category. This table excludes Latinos from the racial categories and assigns them to a separate category. Hispanics/Latinos may be of any race.
Race / Ethnicity (NH = Non-Hispanic)	Pop 2010	Pop 2020	% 2010	% 2020
White alone (NH)	63	59	75.90%	74.68%
Black or African American alone (NH)	18	15	21.69%	18.99%
Native American or Alaska Native alone (NH)	0	0	0.00%	0.00%
Asian alone (NH)	0	0	0.00%	0.00%
Native Hawaiian or Pacific Islander alone (NH)	0	1	0.00%	1.27%
Other race alone (NH)	0	2	0.00%	2.53%
Mixed race or Multiracial (NH)	0	0	0.00%	0.00%
Hispanic or Latino (any race)	2	2	2.41%	2.53%
Total	83	79	100.00%	100.00%
