= Screamer, Alabama =

Unincorporated community in Alabama, United States

- Unincorporated community
- Location within Alabama Location within the United States
- Coordinates: 31°43′33″N 85°10′32″W
- Country: United States
- State: Alabama
- County: Henry
- Elevation: 335 ft (102 m)
- Time zone: UTC-6 (Central (CST))
  - Summer (DST): UTC-5 (CDT)
- Area code: 334
- GNIS feature ID: 1729818

Screamer is an unincorporated community in Henry County, Alabama, United States. Screamer is located on Alabama State Route 95, 12.4 miles (20.0 km) north-northeast of Abbeville. The original line established between the Creek Indians and the United States in the Treaty of Fort Jackson ran through Screamer. The Treaty of Cusseta ceded the boundary line north, allowing Henry County to gain land.
