= Avon, Alabama =

- Town
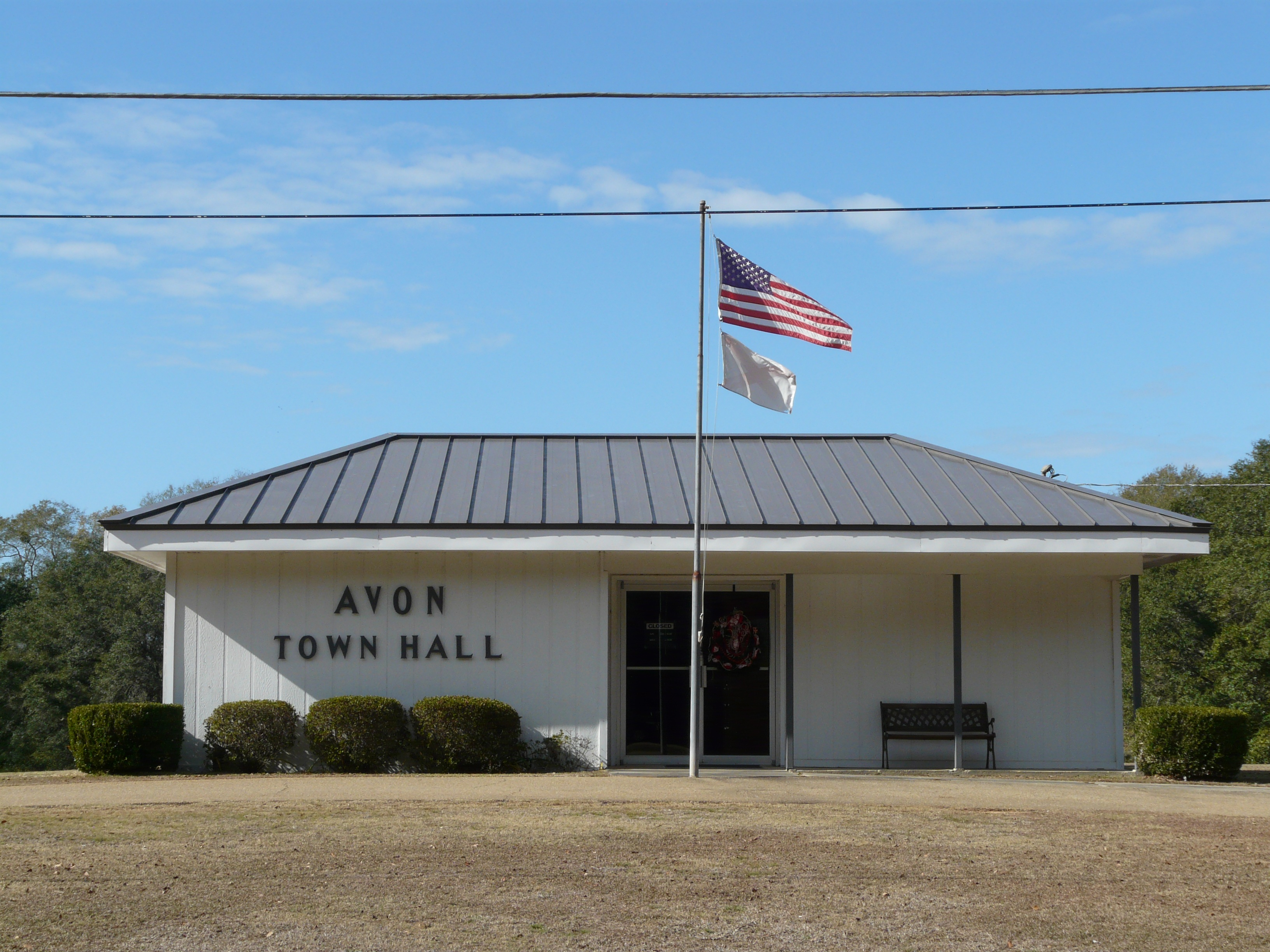
- Town hall

- Location of Avon in Houston County, Alabama.
- Coordinates: 31°10′47″N 85°16′44″W
- Country: United States
- State: Alabama
- County: Houston

Government
  - Type: Mayor-Council
  - Mayor: Evan Gardner

Area
  - Total: 2.37 sq mi (6.14 km^{2})
  - Land: 2.36 sq mi (6.12 km^{2})
  - Water: 0.0077 sq mi (0.02 km^{2})
- Elevation: 269 ft (82 m)

Population (2020)
  - Total: 465
  - Density: 196.8/sq mi (75.97/km^{2})
- Time zone: UTC-6 (Central (CST))
  - Summer (DST): UTC-5 (CDT)
- ZIP Code: 36312
- Area code: 334
- FIPS code: 01-03364
- GNIS feature ID: 2405191

Avon is a town in Houston County, Alabama, United States. It incorporated in January 1957. It is part of the Dothan, Alabama Metropolitan Statistical Area. As of the 2020 census, Avon had a population of 465.

== Geography ==
Avon is located near the geographic center of Houston County. It is bordered to the northwest by Cowarts, and the town limits of Ashford are 0.3 miles (0.48 km) to the east. U.S. Route 84 passes through Avon, leading west 7 miles (11 km) to the center of Dothan and southeast 14 miles (23 km) to the Georgia state line at the Chattahoochee River. Bainbridge, Georgia, is 48 miles (77 km) southeast of Avon.

According to the U.S. Census Bureau, the town has a total area of 2.7 square miles (6.9 km^{2}), of which 0.02 square miles (0.05 km^{2}), or 0.78%, are water.

== Demographics ==
Historical population
Census	Pop.	Note	%±
1960	132		—
1970	374		183.3%
1980	433		15.8%
1990	462		6.7%
2000	466		0.9%
2010	543		16.5%
2020	465		−14.4%
U.S. Decennial Census

=== 2000 Census data ===
As of the census of 2000, there were 466 people, 185 households, and 138 families residing in the town. The population density was 176.9 inhabitants per square mile (68.3/km^{2}). There were 202 housing units at an average density of 76.7 per square mile (29.6/km^{2}). The racial makeup of the town was 94.42% White, 4.29% Black or African American, 0.21% Native American, and 1.07% from two or more races. 0.43% of the population were Hispanic or Latino of any race.

There were 185 households, out of which 36.8% had children under the age of 18 living with them, 61.1% were married couples living together, 9.2% had a female householder with no husband present, and 24.9% were non-families. 21.1% of all households were made up of individuals, and 8.6% had someone living alone who was 65 years of age or older. The average household size was 2.52 and the average family size was 2.88.

In the town, the population was spread out, with 23.4% under the age of 18, 10.1% from 18 to 24, 32.2% from 25 to 44, 21.7% from 45 to 64, and 12.7% who were 65 years of age or older. The median age was 38 years. For every 100 females, there were 98.3 males. For every 100 females age 18 and over, there were 96.2 males.

The median income for a household in the town was $37,679, and the median income for a family was $42,273. Males had a median income of $28,438 versus $18,068 for females. The per capita income for the town was $18,152. About 9.2% of families and 12.4% of the population were below the poverty line, including 18.9% of those under age 18 and 4.3% of those age 65 or over.

=== 2020 Census data ===
Avon racial composition
Race	Num.	Perc.
White (non-Hispanic)	409	87.96%
Black or African American (non-Hispanic)	27	5.81%
Native American	3	0.65%
Asian	2	0.43%
Other/Mixed	14	3.01%
Hispanic or Latino	10	2.15%

As of the 2020 United States census, there were 465 people, 200 households, and 161 families residing in the town.
