= Franklin Field (Alabama) =

- IATA: none; ICAO: none; FAA LID: 07A

Summary
- Airport type: Public
- Owner: Bullock County
- Serves: Bullock County, Alabama
- Location: Union Springs, Alabama
- Elevation AMSL: 300 ft (91 m)
- Coordinates: 32°10′01″N 085°48′35″W
- Interactive map of Franklin Field

Runways
Direction	Length		Surface
Direction	ft	m	Surface
14/32	3,660	1,116	Asphalt

Statistics (2010)
- Aircraft operations: 6,545
- Source: Federal Aviation Administration

Franklin Field (FAA LID: 07A) is a county-owned public-use airport in Bullock County, Alabama, United States. It is located five nautical miles (5.8 mi; 9.3 km) west of the central business district of Union Springs, Alabama. It is included in the FAA's National Plan of Integrated Airport Systems for 2011–2015, which categorized it as a general aviation facility.

== Facilities and aircraft ==
Franklin Field covers an area of 50 acres (20 ha) at an elevation of 300 feet (91 m) above mean sea level. It has one runway designated 14/32 with an asphalt surface measuring 5,000 by 80 feet (1,524 by 24 m). For the 12-month period ending November 19, 2010, the airport had 6,545 general aviation aircraft operations, an average of 17 per day.

== See also ==
- List of airports in Alabama
