= White Oak, Alabama =

Unincorporated community in Alabama, US

- Unincorporated community
- Location within Alabama Location within the United States
- Coordinates: 31°46′07″N 85°09′09″W
- Country: United States
- State: Alabama
- County: Henry
- Elevation: 269 ft (82 m)
- Time zone: UTC-6 (Central (CST))
  - Summer (DST): UTC-5 (CDT)
- Area code: 334
- GNIS feature ID: 128879

White Oak is an unincorporated community in Henry County, Alabama, United States. White Oak is located on Alabama State Route 95, 15.8 miles (25.4 km) north-northeast of Abbeville.
