= Taylorville, Alabama =

- Unincorporated community
- Location within Alabama Location within the United States
- Coordinates: 33°08′36″N 87°32′50″W
- Country: United States
- State: Alabama
- County: Tuscaloosa
- Elevation: 272 ft (83 m)
- Time zone: UTC-6 (Central (CST))
  - Summer (DST): UTC-5 (CDT)
- Area codes: 205, 659
- GNIS feature ID: 153664

Taylorville is an unincorporated community in Tuscaloosa County, Alabama, United States. Taylorville was once the home of the Columbian Institute, a preparatory school. The school was founded by Edward Tarrant, who while serving as superintendent of the Tuscaloosa County schools, joined Lumsden's Alabama Battery during the American Civil War. During his time of service, he fought at Fort Gaines, Ship Island, the Siege of Corinth, and Battle of Shiloh. After the war, the name of the school was changed to the Pelham Institute, in honor of John Pelham.
