= Clare Purcell =

American Methodist bishop

Clare Purcell (17 November 1884 – 8 February 1964) was an American bishop of the Methodist Episcopal Church, South and the Methodist Church, elected in 1938.

== Birth and family ==
Clare was born 17 November 1884, the youngest of six children of William Henry and Mary Ellen (Callen) Purcell of Roanoke, Alabama. Clare's family was of a very old connection in North Carolina, described in the Lumber River Scots. His mother was descended from Skelton Smith, a 15-year-old soldier of the Revolutionary War. His father was in the 13th North Carolina Regiment of the Confederate States Army and served in battle. Clare married Ida West (whom he met in college) 28 December 1910 and they had three children: John Robert (b. 02 Jul 1915), William Wood Rowe (b. 19 Dec 1911) and Ida Claire (b. 05 Jan 1921).

== Education ==
Clare was educated at Roanoke Normal College, graduating in 1903. After working for the Georgia Railroad in Roanoke and Birmingham, Alabama, and Columbus, Georgia, in 1906 he enrolled at Emory University. He was a member of Phi Delta Theta while at Emory. However, health problems prevented him from completing his degree.

In 1907 Rev. Purcell enrolled in the Bachelor of Divinity program at Vanderbilt University. He earned his B.D. degree in 1916. He also earned an A.B. degree from Birmingham College the same year.

== Ordained ministry ==
Rev. Purcell was granted a Local Preacher's License in 1906 by the Lafayette District Conference of the M.E. Church, South. In November of that year he was admitted on trial to the North Alabama Annual Conference, serving a one-year appointment on the Wedowee Circuit. He was ordained deacon in 1911 and elder in 1913. Between 1911 and 1918 Rev. Purcell served the following appointments: Madison Circuit, the Owenton Church (later renamed McCoy Memorial) in Birmingham, and First Methodist Church of Sylacauga.

In 1918 Rev. Purcell entered service as a chaplain in the 131st Infantry of the U.S. Army during World War I. He spent the winter of 1918 in Luxembourg. Upon his return from military service, Rev. Purcell was appointed to the First Methodist Church of Hartselle. In 1920 he was appointed to Talladega, and in 1924 to Tuscaloosa. In 1927 Rev. Purcell as appointed presiding elder of the Jasper District. In 1931 he became the pastor of the First Methodist Church of Gadsden, where he remained until 1938.

Rev. Purcell also served the greater Church as a member of the Commission on Methodist Unification (1934–38).

== Episcopal ministry ==
The Rev. Clare Purcell was elected to the episcopacy 3 May 1938, by the General Conference of the M.E. Church, South, following a well-received speech in which he argued in favor of union with the Methodist Episcopal Church and the Methodist Protestant Church. Bishop Purcell was assigned to the Charlotte Episcopal Area (1938–48), and to the Birmingham Episcopal Area from 1948 until his retirement in 1956. He served as president of the Council of Bishops of The Methodist Church, 1955-56.

In retirement, Bishop Purcell remained in Birmingham, where he served as president of the board of directors of Carraway Methodist Hospital. Bishop Purcell died 8 February 1964.

== See also ==
- List of bishops of the United Methodist Church
