= Tabernacle, Alabama =

Unincorporated community in Alabama, United States

- Unincorporated community
- Location within Alabama Location within the United States
- Coordinates: 31°27′05″N 85°52′17″W
- Country: United States
- State: Alabama
- County: Coffee
- Elevation: 436 ft (133 m)
- Time zone: UTC-6 (Central (CST))
  - Summer (DST): UTC-5 (CDT)
- Area code: 334
- GNIS feature ID: 127619

Tabernacle, also spelled Tabanacle, is an unincorporated community in Coffee County, Alabama, United States. Tabernacle is located along Alabama State Route 51, 5.7 miles (9.2 km) north-northwest of New Brockton.

== History ==
A post office operated under the name Tabernacle from 1890 to 1904.
