= Cowarts, Alabama =

- Town
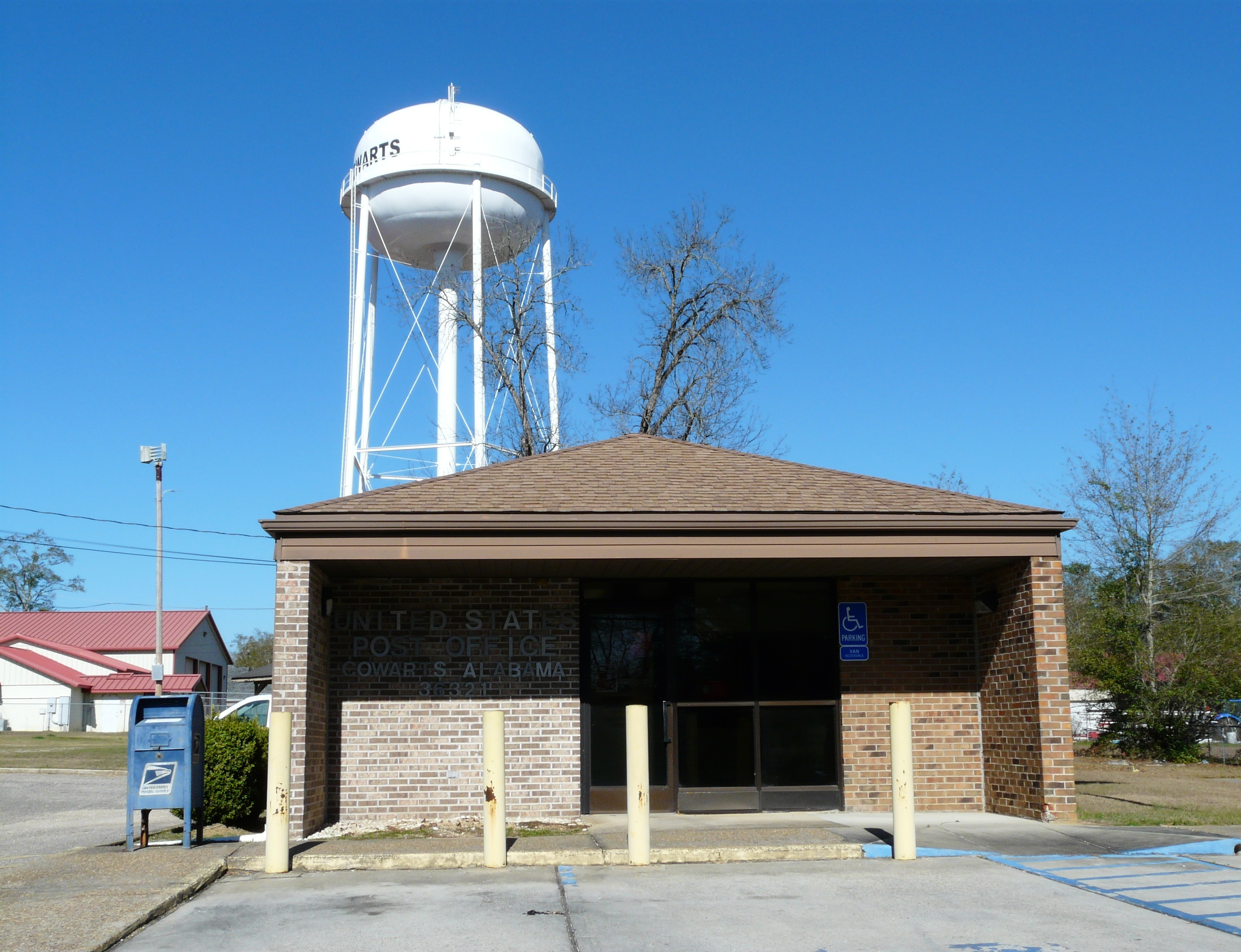
- Post Office

- Logo

- Location of Cowarts in Houston County, Alabama.
- Coordinates: 31°12′12″N 85°18′21″W
- Country: United States
- State: Alabama
- County: Houston

Area
  - Total: 7.72 sq mi (19.99 km^{2})
  - Land: 7.65 sq mi (19.82 km^{2})
  - Water: 0.066 sq mi (0.17 km^{2})
- Elevation: 341 ft (104 m)

Population (2020)
  - Total: 1,930
  - Density: 252.2/sq mi (97.36/km^{2})
- Time zone: UTC-6 (Central (CST))
  - Summer (DST): UTC-5 (CDT)
- ZIP code: 36321
- Area code: 334
- FIPS code: 01-18088
- GNIS feature ID: 2406329
- Website: www.cowartsal.com

Cowarts /ˈkaʊ.ərts/ is a town in Houston County, Alabama, United States. The town incorporated in August 1961. It is part of the Dothan, Alabama Metropolitan Statistical Area. As of the 2020 census, Cowarts had a population of 1,930.

== Geography ==
Cowarts is located in north-central Houston County and is bordered to the north and west by the city of Dothan and to the southeast by the town of Avon. A small part of the northern border of Cowarts is with the town of Webb.

U.S. Route 84 passes through the southern part of the town, leading west 6 miles (10 km) to the center of Dothan and southeast 48 miles (77 km) to Bainbridge, Georgia.

According to the U.S. Census Bureau, Cowarts has a total area of 7.3 square miles (18.9 km^{2}), of which 7.3 square miles (18.8 km^{2}) are land and 0.04 square miles (0.1 km^{2}), or 0.58%, are water.

== Demographics ==
Historical population
Census	Pop.	Note	%±
1970	350		—
1980	418		19.4%
1990	1,400		234.9%
2000	1,546		10.4%
2010	1,871		21.0%
2020	1,930		3.2%
U.S. Decennial Census; 2013 Estimate

=== Racial and ethnic composition ===
Cowarts town, Alabama – Racial and ethnic composition Note: the US Census treats Hispanic/Latino as an ethnic category. This table excludes Latinos from the racial categories and assigns them to a separate category. Hispanics/Latinos may be of any race. Race and ethnicity was not surveyed for populations under 2,500 in the 1980 census and under 1,000 in 1990 census.
Race / Ethnicity (NH = Non-Hispanic)	Pop 1990	Pop 2000	Pop 2010	Pop 2020	% 1990	% 2000	% 2010	% 2020
White alone (NH)	1,264	1,311	1,503	1,496	90.29%	84.80%	80.33%	77.51%
Black or African American alone (NH)	116	191	271	271	8.29%	12.35%	14.48%	14.04%
Native American or Alaska Native alone (NH)	12	10	8	11	0.86%	0.65%	0.43%	0.57%
Asian alone (NH)	4	6	2	1	0.29%	0.39%	0.11%	0.05%
Native Hawaiian or Pacific Islander alone (NH)	x	0	0	0	x	0.00%	0.00%	0.00%
Other race alone (NH)	0	0	7	7	0.00%	0.00%	0.37%	0.36%
Mixed race or Multiracial (NH)	x	20	49	94	x	1.29%	2.62%	4.87%
Hispanic or Latino (any race)	4	8	31	50	0.29%	0.52%	1.66%	2.59%
Total	1,400	1,546	1,871	1,930	100.00%	100.00%	100.00%	100.00%

=== 2020 census ===
As of the 2020 census, Cowarts had a population of 1,930. The median age was 39.2 years. 23.3% of residents were under the age of 18 and 18.6% were age 65 or older. For every 100 females, there were 96.3 males, and for every 100 females age 18 and over, there were 89.7 males.

0.3% of residents lived in urban areas, while 99.7% lived in rural areas.

There were 749 households in the town, including 568 families. Of all households, 31.9% had children under the age of 18 living in them, 50.6% were married-couple households, 17.6% had a male householder with no spouse or partner present, and 26.3% had a female householder with no spouse or partner present. About 23.6% of households were made up of individuals, and 11.7% had someone living alone who was age 65 or older.

There were 827 housing units, of which 9.4% were vacant. The homeowner vacancy rate was 0.3% and the rental vacancy rate was 13.2%.

=== 2010 census ===
At the 2010 census there were 1,871 people, 734 households, and 557 families in the town. The population density was 259.9 inhabitants per square mile (100.3/km^{2}). There were 814 housing units at an average density of 113.1 per square mile (43.7/km^{2}). The racial makeup of the town was 80.8% White, 14.6% Black or African American, 0.7% Native American, 0.1% Asian, 0.6% from other races, and 3.2% from two or more races. 1.7% of the population were Hispanic or Latino of any race. Of the 734 households 29.4% had children under the age of 18 living with them, 57.2% were married couples living together, 13.6% had a female householder with no husband present, and 24.1% were non-families. 21.1% of households were one person and 8.2% were one person aged 65 or older. The average household size was 2.55 and the average family size was 2.92.

The age distribution was 24.3% under the age of 18, 6.5% from 18 to 24, 25.9% from 25 to 44, 29.2% from 45 to 64, and 14.2% 65 or older. The median age was 40.1 years. For every 100 females, there were 94.7 males. For every 100 females age 18 and over, there were 97.4 males.

The median household income was $36,014 and the median family income was $47,625. Males had a median income of $42,016 versus $29,450 for females. The per capita income for the town was $19,808. About 10.4% of families and 14.6% of the population were below the poverty line, including 22.8% of those under age 18 and 17.3% of those age 65 or over.

=== 2000 census ===
At the 2000 census there were 1,546 people, 603 households, and 469 families in the town. The population density was 213.6 inhabitants per square mile (82.5/km^{2}). There were 684 housing units at an average density of 94.5 per square mile (36.5/km^{2}). The racial makeup of the town was 84.93% White, 12.35% Black or African American, 0.65% Native American, 0.39% Asian, 0.39% from other races, and 1.29% from two or more races. 0.52% of the population were Hispanic or Latino of any race. Of the 603 households 32.3% had children under the age of 18 living with them, 58.9% were married couples living together, 15.8% had a female householder with no husband present, and 22.1% were non-families. 18.6% of households were one person and 6.8% were one person aged 65 or older. The average household size was 2.56 and the average family size was 2.90.

The age distribution was 24.7% under the age of 18, 8.8% from 18 to 24, 28.1% from 25 to 44, 27.5% from 45 to 64, and 10.9% 65 or older. The median age was 36 years. For every 100 females, there were 92.3 males. For every 100 females age 18 and over, there were 89.6 males.

The median household income was $36,688 and the median family income was $41,198. Males had a median income of $28,281 versus $19,464 for females. The per capita income for the town was $17,793. About 10.3% of families and 13.1% of the population were below the poverty line, including 16.7% of those under age 18 and 18.0% of those age 65 or over.
