= Webb, Alabama =

- Town
- Location of Webb in Houston County, Alabama.
- Coordinates: 31°14′47″N 85°17′28″W
- Country: United States
- State: Alabama
- County: Houston

Area
  - Total: 11.26 sq mi (29.16 km^{2})
  - Land: 11.26 sq mi (29.16 km^{2})
  - Water: 0 sq mi (0.00 km^{2})
- Elevation: 292 ft (89 m)

Population (2020)
  - Total: 1,270
  - Density: 112.8/sq mi (43.55/km^{2})
- Time zone: UTC-6 (Central (CST))
  - Summer (DST): UTC-5 (CDT)
- ZIP code: 36376
- Area code: 334
- FIPS code: 01-80376
- GNIS feature ID: 2406847
- Website: www.webbalabama.com

Webb is a town in Houston County, Alabama, United States. It is named for plantation owner B. F. Webb, who settled in the area around 1890. The town was incorporated in 1903. It is part of the Dothan, Alabama Metropolitan Statistical Area. As of the 2020 census, Webb had a population of 1,270.

== Geography ==
Webb is located in northern Houston County. It is bordered to the northwest by the town of Kinsey, to the west by the city of Dothan, and at its southern tip by the town of Cowarts.

Alabama State Route 52 passes through Webb, leading west 7 miles (11 km) into Dothan and east 10 miles (16 km) to Columbia at the Georgia border.

According to the U.S. Census Bureau, the town of Webb has a total area of 11.4 square miles (29.5 km^{2}), all land.

== Demographics ==
Historical population
Census	Pop.	Note	%±
1910	256		—
1920	415		62.1%
1930	400		−3.6%
1940	379		−5.2%
1950	344		−9.2%
1960	331		−3.8%
1970	354		6.9%
1980	448		26.6%
1990	1,039		131.9%
2000	1,298		24.9%
2010	1,430		10.2%
2020	1,270		−11.2%
U.S. Decennial Census; 2013 Estimate

=== 2020 census ===
As of the 2020 census, Webb had a population of 1,270. The median age was 43.4 years. 19.4% of residents were under the age of 18 and 19.2% of residents were 65 years of age or older. For every 100 females there were 99.7 males, and for every 100 females age 18 and over there were 94.5 males age 18 and over.

0.0% of residents lived in urban areas, while 100.0% lived in rural areas.

There were 527 households in Webb, including 330 families. Of all households, 31.3% had children under the age of 18 living in them, 46.5% were married-couple households, 19.0% were households with a male householder and no spouse or partner present, and 27.3% were households with a female householder and no spouse or partner present. About 27.0% of all households were made up of individuals and 10.8% had someone living alone who was 65 years of age or older.

There were 592 housing units, of which 11.0% were vacant. The homeowner vacancy rate was 2.3% and the rental vacancy rate was 3.8%.

Webb racial composition
Race	Num.	Perc.
White (non-Hispanic)	923	72.68%
Black or African American (non-Hispanic)	217	17.09%
Native American	3	0.24%
Asian	3	0.24%
Pacific Islander	3	0.24%
Other/Mixed	66	5.2%
Hispanic or Latino	55	4.33%

=== 2010 census ===
At the 2010 census there were 1,430 people, 544 households, and 391 families in the town. The population density was 122.2 inhabitants per square mile (47.2/km^{2}). There were 616 housing units at an average density of 52.6 per square mile (20.3/km^{2}). The racial makeup of the town was 74.8% White, 18.7% Black or African American, 0.7% Native American, and 1.5% from two or more races. 6.2% of the population were Hispanic or Latino of any race. Of the 544 households 28.5% had children under the age of 18 living with them, 52.0% were married couples living together, 14.5% had a female householder with no husband present, and 28.1% were non-families. 22.1% of households were one person and 7.9% were one person aged 65 or older. The average household size was 2.60 and the average family size was 3.05.

The age distribution was 24.0% under the age of 18, 8.0% from 18 to 24, 27.6% from 25 to 44, 26.9% from 45 to 64, and 13.6% 65 or older. The median age was 39.1 years. For every 100 females, there were 98.6 males. For every 100 females age 18 and over, there were 98.4 males.

The median household income was $34,650 and the median family income was $38,352. Males had a median income of $32,847 versus $18,938 for females. The per capita income for the town was $15,124. About 13.2% of families and 15.4% of the population were below the poverty line, including 20.2% of those under age 18 and 13.7% of those age 65 or over.

=== 2000 census ===
At the 2000 census there were 1,298 people, 491 households, and 375 families in the town. The population density was 110.6 inhabitants per square mile (42.7/km^{2}). There were 523 housing units at an average density of 44.6 per square mile (17.2/km^{2}). The racial makeup of the town was 79.20% White, 19.65% Black or African American, 0.31% Native American, and 0.85% from two or more races. 1.00% of the population were Hispanic or Latino of any race. Of the 491 households 38.1% had children under the age of 18 living with them, 61.9% were married couples living together, 11.4% had a female householder with no husband present, and 23.6% were non-families. 22.6% of households were one person and 8.6% were one person aged 65 or older. The average household size was 2.63 and the average family size was 3.06.

The age distribution was 28.1% under the age of 18, 8.1% from 18 to 24, 29.7% from 25 to 44, 23.7% from 45 to 64, and 10.5% 65 or older. The median age was 35 years. For every 100 females, there were 92.3 males. For every 100 females age 18 and over, there were 88.9 males.

The median household income was $31,364 and the median family income was $36,667. Males had a median income of $32,656 versus $19,479 for females. The per capita income for the town was $15,150. About 13.7% of families and 17.0% of the population were below the poverty line, including 22.4% of those under age 18 and 16.9% of those age 65 or over.
