= Sandtown, Alabama =

- Unincorporated community
- Location within Alabama Location within the United States
- Coordinates: 33°35′24″N 87°29′31″W
- Country: United States
- State: Alabama
- County: Tuscaloosa
- Elevation: 663 ft (202 m)
- Time zone: UTC-6 (Central (CST))
  - Summer (DST): UTC-5 (CDT)
- Area codes: 205, 659
- GNIS feature ID: 157013

Sandtown is an unincorporated community in Tuscaloosa County, Alabama, United States.
