= Underwood-Petersville, Alabama =

- Census-designated place (CDP)
- Location of Underwood-Petersville in Lauderdale County, Alabama.
- Coordinates: 34°52′19″N 87°41′53″W
- Country: United States
- State: Alabama
- County: Lauderdale

Area
  - Total: 5.81 sq mi (15.06 km^{2})
  - Land: 5.80 sq mi (15.01 km^{2})
  - Water: 0.019 sq mi (0.05 km^{2})
- Elevation: 627 ft (191 m)

Population (2020)
  - Total: 3,051
  - Density: 526.4/sq mi (203.25/km^{2})
- Time zone: UTC-6 (Central (CST))
  - Summer (DST): UTC-5 (CDT)
- FIPS code: 01-77580
- GNIS feature ID: 2402943

Underwood-Petersville is a census-designated place (CDP) in Lauderdale County, Alabama United States. It is part of the Florence - Muscle Shoals Metropolitan Statistical Area known as "The Shoals". As of the 2020 census, Underwood-Petersville had a population of 3,051.

== Geography ==
According to the U.S. Census Bureau, the CDP has a total area of 5.9 square miles (15 km^{2}), all land.

== Demographics ==
Historical population
Census	Pop.	Note	%±
1980	3,836		—
1990	3,092		−19.4%
2000	3,137		1.5%
2010	3,247		3.5%
2020	3,051		−6.0%
U.S. Decennial Census

=== Racial and ethnic composition ===
Underwood-Petersville CDP, Alabama – Racial and ethnic composition Note: the US Census treats Hispanic/Latino as an ethnic category. This table excludes Latinos from the racial categories and assigns them to a separate category. Hispanics/Latinos may be of any race.
Race / Ethnicity (NH = Non-Hispanic)	Pop 2000	Pop 2010	Pop 2020	% 2000	% 2010	% 2020
White alone (NH)	2,957	2,955	2,598	94.26%	91.01%	85.15%
Black or African American alone (NH)	129	197	221	4.11%	6.07%	7.24%
Native American or Alaska Native alone (NH)	6	8	8	0.19%	0.25%	0.26%
Asian alone (NH)	11	20	26	0.35%	0.62%	0.85%
Native Hawaiian or Pacific Islander alone (NH)	0	0	0	0.00%	0.00%	0.00%
Other race alone (NH)	2	1	14	0.06%	0.03%	0.46%
Mixed race or Multiracial (NH)	15	35	101	0.48%	1.08%	3.31%
Hispanic or Latino (any race)	17	31	83	0.54%	0.95%	2.72%
Total	3,137	3,247	3,051	100.00%	100.00%	100.00%

=== 2020 census ===
As of the 2020 census, Underwood-Petersville had a population of 3,051. The median age was 42.5 years. 21.2% of residents were under the age of 18 and 20.1% of residents were 65 years of age or older. For every 100 females, there were 95.8 males, and for every 100 females age 18 and over, there were 94.6 males age 18 and over.

74.7% of residents lived in urban areas, while 25.3% lived in rural areas.

There were 1,307 households in Underwood-Petersville, of which 26.2% had children under the age of 18 living in them. Of all households, 46.3% were married-couple households, 18.3% were households with a male householder and no spouse or partner present, and 30.3% were households with a female householder and no spouse or partner present. About 29.3% of all households were made up of individuals, and 13.9% had someone living alone who was 65 years of age or older.

There were 1,415 housing units, of which 7.6% were vacant. The homeowner vacancy rate was 1.9% and the rental vacancy rate was 5.5%.

=== 2010 census ===
As of the census of 2010, there were 3,247 people, 1,382 households, and 939 families residing in the CDP. The population density was 550 inhabitants per square mile (210/km^{2}). There were 1,506 housing units at an average density of 255.3 per square mile (98.6/km^{2}). The racial makeup of the CDP was 91.3% White, 6.2% Black or African American, 0.2% Native American, 0.6% Asian, 0.4% from other races, and 0.57% from two or more races. 1.0% of the population were Hispanic or Latino of any race.

There were 1,382 households, out of which 26.2% had children under the age of 18 living with them, 49.4% were married couples living together, 14.5% had a female householder with no husband present, and 32.1% were non-families. 28.4% of all households were made up of individuals, and 10.0% had someone living alone who was 65 years of age or older. The average household size was 2.34 and the average family size was 2.86.

In the CDP, the population was spread out, with 22.0% under the age of 18, 9.0% from 18 to 24, 25.1% from 25 to 44, 27.3% from 45 to 64, and 16.7% who were 65 years of age or older. The median age was 40.7 years. For every 100 females, there were 90.9 males. For every 100 females age 18 and over, there were 91.9 males.

The median income for a household in the CDP was $39,774, and the median income for a family was $47,356. Males had a median income of $46,950 versus $29,167 for females. The per capita income for the CDP was $21,534. About 9.4% of families and 11.2% of the population were below the poverty line, including 10.6% of those under age 18 and 1.2% of those age 65 or over.

=== 2000 census ===
As of the census of 2000, there were 3,137 people, 1,295 households, and 953 families residing in the CDP. The population density was 520.5 inhabitants per square mile (201.0/km^{2}). There were 1,378 housing units at an average density of 228.6 per square mile (88.3/km^{2}). The racial makeup of the CDP was 94.68% White, 4.11% Black or African American, 0.19% Native American, 0.35% Asian, 0.10% from other races, and 0.57% from two or more races. 0.54% of the population were Hispanic or Latino of any race.

There were 1,295 households, out of which 30.2% had children under the age of 18 living with them, 60.1% were married couples living together, 9.7% had a female householder with no husband present, and 26.4% were non-families. 23.2% of all households were made up of individuals, and 9.3% had someone living alone who was 65 years of age or older. The average household size was 2.42 and the average family size was 2.84.

In the CDP, the population was spread out, with 22.4% under the age of 18, 8.0% from 18 to 24, 28.2% from 25 to 44, 25.7% from 45 to 64, and 15.7% who were 65 years of age or older. The median age was 40 years. For every 100 females, there were 98.4 males. For every 100 females age 18 and over, there were 95.6 males.

The median income for a household in the CDP was $37,159, and the median income for a family was $45,212. Males had a median income of $35,301 versus $21,129 for females. The per capita income for the CDP was $17,461. About 8.4% of families and 12.2% of the population were below the poverty line, including 19.8% of those under age 18 and 9.4% of those age 65 or over.
