= Suspension, Alabama =

- Ghost town
- Location within Alabama
- Coordinates: 32°11′48″N 85°35′17″W
- Country: United States
- State: Alabama
- County: Bullock
- Elevation: 417 ft (127 m)
- Time zone: UTC-6 (Central (CST))
  - Summer (DST): UTC-5 (CDT)
- GNIS feature ID: 157130

Suspension is a ghost town in Bullock County, Alabama, United States.

== History ==
The settlement began as an ancient Muscogee village called "Chananagi".

The name "Suspension" derives from the temporary suspension of railroad construction at the settlement. The Mobile and Girard Railroad incorporated in 1849 and began laying a track southwest from Phenix City, Alabama. By 1852–53, the grading of the railroad bed had been completed to Union Springs, located 9 mi (14 km) southwest of the settlement, however, by 1858 the laying of track had only been completed to a location known as "Stewarts Mill" because extensive excavations were required to complete the track from Stewarts Mill to Union Springs. Because the track laying was temporarily suspended at Stewarts Mill, the location became known as "Suspension". The track was finally completed to Union Springs in 1859–60.

Bullock County Road 40 crosses the now-abandoned railway at Suspension, though nothing remains of the settlement.
