= Alabama State Route 95 =

State highway in Alabama, United States

State Route 95

Route information
- Maintained by ALDOT
- Length: 41.700 mi (67.110 km)

Major junctions
- South end: SR 52 near Columbia
- SR 10 in Abbeville
- North end: US 431 in Eufaula

Location
- Country: United States
- State: Alabama
- Counties: Houston, Henry, Barbour

Highway system
- Alabama State Highway System; Interstate; US; State
| ← SR 94 | → SR 96 |

State Route 95 (SR 95) is a 41.700-mile-long (67.110 km) state highway that extends from SR 52 near Columbia in Houston County to U.S. Route 431 (US 431) in southern Eufaula in Barbour County.

County Route 95 (CR 95), which was part of SR 95 until it was swapped for the new SR 605 in 2012, continues south from SR 52 to the Florida state line.

== Route description ==
SR 95 begins at an intersection with SR 52 in Columbia and proceeds north as Main Street. South of Columbia, the route is designated as County Road 95 that goes south through Gordon and then reaching the Florida state line and continuing as County Road 164, which leads to County Road 271 and Sneads. It intersects SR 134's eastern terminus as it exits town. It runs parallel with the Chattahoochee River (Alabama-Georgia State Line) as it proceeds north. It then passes through Haleburg and then enters Abbeville. The stretch from County highway 30 north of Columbia to Abbeville is designated as the George H. Grimsley Highway. In Abbeville, SR 95 intersects SR 10, running near SR 27. It then crosses over Vann Mill Creek and then Little Abbie Creek, running by Mathison Lake. Then, the route passes through White Oak and crosses over the White Oak Creek before reaching its northern terminus at US 431/SR 1 south of Eufaula.

== Major intersections ==
| County | Location | mi | km | Destinations | Notes |
|---|---|---|---|---|---|
| Houston | | 0.000 | 0.000 | SR 52 west – Dothan | South end of SR 52 concurrency |
| Houston | Columbia | 1.330 | 2.140 | SR 52 east (Church Street) – Blakely | North end of SR 52 concurrency |
| Houston | Columbia | 2.358 | 3.795 | SR 134 west – Headland | |
| Henry | Abbeville | 23.604 | 37.987 | SR 10 (East Washington Street) | |
| Barbour | Eufaula | 41.700 | 67.110 | US 431 (SR 1) – Abbeville, Eufaula | Northern terminus |
1.000 mi = 1.609 km; 1.000 km = 0.621 mi: Concurrency terminus
