= Thompson, Alabama =

Unincorporated community in Alabama, United States

- Unincorporated community
- Location within Alabama Location within the United States
- Coordinates: 32°11′07″N 85°49′05″W
- Country: United States
- State: Alabama
- County: Bullock
- Elevation: 282 ft (86 m)
- Time zone: UTC-6 (Central (CST))
  - Summer (DST): UTC-5 (CDT)
- Area code: 334
- GNIS feature ID: 127884

Thompson, also known as Thompson Station, is an unincorporated community in Bullock County, Alabama, United States.

== History ==
Thompson was incorporated on September 8, 1883, and its charter was repealed in July 1919. A post office was operated in Thompson from 1878 to 1954.

== Demographics ==
Historical population
Census	Pop.	Note	%±
1900	145		—
1910	263		81.4%
1920	206		−21.7%
U.S. Decennial Census
