= Scottland, Alabama =

Unincorporated community in Alabama, United States

Scotland, Alabama
- Unincorporated community
- Location within Alabama Location within the United States
- Coordinates: 32°01′36″N 85°42′23″W
- Country: United States
- State: Alabama
- County: Bullock
- Elevation: 551 ft (168 m)
- Time zone: UTC-6 (Central (CST))
  - Summer (DST): UTC-5 (CDT)
- Area code: 334
- GNIS feature ID: 157027

Scottland is an unincorporated community in Bullock County, Alabama, United States.

During the 18th century, many settlers from other locales in the southern states were attracted to it as such reminiscent of their ancestral homelands in Scotland, and named it for those.
