= Bullock County, Alabama =

County in Alabama, United States

- County
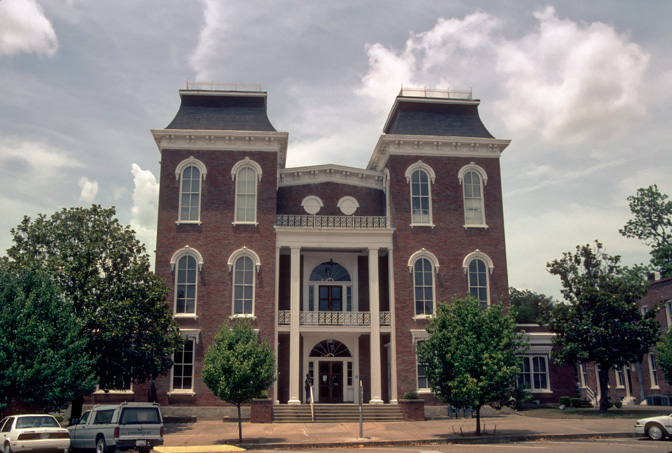
- Bullock County courthouse in Union Springs

- Flag Seal

- Location within the U.S. state of Alabama
- Coordinates: 32°05′52″N 85°43′02″W
- Country: United States
- State: Alabama
- Founded: December 5, 1866
- Named for: Edward Bullock
- Seat: Union Springs
- Largest city: Union Springs

Area
  - Total: 625 sq mi (1,620 km^{2})
  - Land: 623 sq mi (1,610 km^{2})
  - Water: 2.3 sq mi (6.0 km^{2}) 0.4%

Population (2020)
  - Total: 10,357
  - Estimate (2025): 9,780 ▼
  - Density: 16.6/sq mi (6.42/km^{2})
- Time zone: UTC−6 (Central)
  - Summer (DST): UTC−5 (CDT)
- Congressional district: 2nd
- Website: bullockcountyalrev.com
- County Number 09 on Alabama Licence Plates

Bullock County is a county of the U.S. state of Alabama. As of the 2020 census, the population was 10,357. Union Springs was chosen as the county seat in 1867, and presently is the county's only incorporated city. The county was named for Confederate Army Colonel Edward C. Bullock who was a state senator and outspoken secessionist who died during the American Civil War.

A National Center for Education Statistics report released in January 2009 showed that Bullock County had the highest illiteracy rate in Alabama at 34 percent.

== History ==
Bullock County was established by act of the state legislature dated December 5, 1866, with areas partitioned from Macon, Pike, Montgomery, and Barbour counties. The boundaries were changed in February 1867.

Prior to the arrival of white settlers, the future Bullock County was inhabited by Creek Indians. The Treaty of Fort Jackson (1814) ceded much of Alabama and Georgia to the US government, and the Creeks were removed completely after 1830. From 1818 through the 1830s, white settlers poured into the area, turning the rich soil into cotton-producing plantations and the area into one of the state's richest.

Bullock County was devastated by the Civil War. Its once-enslaved population (about seventy percent of the total population) had sustained its output, but their emancipation caused a sharp decline in the economy. In the aftermath, Bullock County elected two former slaves to the state legislature, but with end of Reconstruction, the black population were severely restricted and kept down.

By 1877 the boll weevil had migrated into Bullock County cotton fields from Mexico, and the area's economy was further depressed. A significant portion of the once-cotton-producing area was converted to a site of the Amateur Field Trial competition for bird dogs and a game preserve.

== Geography ==
Prior to white settlement, the future Bullock County terrain was completely wooded. It still bears a significant coverage of trees, with the remainder having been cleared for agricultural or urban usage. A range of hills, called Chunnenugga Ridge, bisects the county running east to west. It forms the watershed for the Tallapoosa River on the north, and streams on the south that flow to the Gulf of Mexico, including the Conecuh River, which flows through the extreme west end of Florida to reach the Gulf. The highest point on this ridge (approximately 670 feet/200 meters ASL) lies about 3 miles (4.8 km) west of Sehoy Lake.

According to the United States Census Bureau, the county has a total area of 625 square miles (1,620 km^{2}), of which 623 square miles (1,610 km^{2}) is land and 2.3 square miles (6.0 km^{2}) (0.4%) is water.

=== Adjacent counties ===
- Macon County - north
- Russell County - northeast
- Barbour County - southeast
- Pike County - southwest
- Montgomery County - west

=== Major highways ===
- U.S. Highway 29 / State Route 15 (unsigned)
- U.S. Highway 82 / State Route 6 (unsigned)
- State Route 51
- State Route 110
- State Route 197
- State Route 223
- State Route 239

=== Airport ===
- Franklin Field - county-owned public-use airport, 5.2 miles (8.4 km) WNW from Union Springs.

== Communities ==
=== City ===
- Union Springs (county seat)

=== Town ===
- Midway

=== Census-designated place ===
- Fitzpatrick

=== Unincorporated communities ===
- Aberfoil
- Blues Old Stand
- Corinth
- High Ridge
- Inverness
- Perote
- Scottland
- Smuteye
- Thompson

=== Ghost town ===
- Suspension

== Demographics ==
Historical population
Census	Pop.	Note	%±
1870	24,474		—
1880	29,066		18.8%
1890	27,063		−6.9%
1900	31,944		18.0%
1910	30,196		−5.5%
1920	25,333		−16.1%
1930	20,016		−21.0%
1940	19,810		−1.0%
1950	16,054		−19.0%
1960	13,462		−16.1%
1970	11,824		−12.2%
1980	10,596		−10.4%
1990	11,042		4.2%
2000	11,714		6.1%
2010	10,914		−6.8%
2020	10,357		−5.1%
2025 (est.)	9,780	▼	−5.6%
U.S. Decennial Census; 1790–1960 1900–1990; 1990–2000 2010–2020

=== Racial and ethnic composition ===
Bullock County, Alabama – Racial and ethnic composition Note: the US Census treats Hispanic/Latino as an ethnic category. This table excludes Latinos from the racial categories and assigns them to a separate category. Hispanics/Latinos may be of any race.
Race / Ethnicity (NH = Non-Hispanic)	Pop 1980	Pop 1990	Pop 2000	Pop 2010	Pop 2020	% 1980	% 1990	% 2000	% 2010	% 2020
White alone (NH)	3,403	3,011	2,764	2,392	2,281	32.12%	27.27%	23.60%	21.92%	22.02%
Black or African American alone (NH)	7,026	7,948	8,486	7,637	7,388	66.31%	71.98%	72.44%	69.97%	71.33%
Native American or Alaska Native alone (NH)	1	8	37	20	1	0.01%	0.07%	0.32%	0.18%	0.01%
Asian alone (NH)	4	10	21	20	9	0.04%	0.09%	0.18%	0.18%	0.09%
Native Hawaiian or Pacific Islander alone (NH)	x	x	1	4	7	x	x	0.01%	0.04%	0.07%
Other race alone (NH)	2	0	6	5	31	0.02%	0.00%	0.05%	0.05%	0.30%
Mixed race or Multiracial (NH)	x	x	77	59	137	x	x	0.66%	0.54%	1.32%
Hispanic or Latino (any race)	160	65	322	777	503	1.51%	0.59%	2.75%	7.12%	4.86%
Total	10,596	11,042	11,714	10,914	10,357	100.00%	100.00%	100.00%	100.00%	100.00%

=== 2020 census ===
As of the 2020 census, the county had a population of 10,357. The median age was 42.0 years. 19.3% of residents were under the age of 18 and 17.9% of residents were 65 years of age or older. For every 100 females there were 119.0 males, and for every 100 females age 18 and over there were 123.0 males age 18 and over.

The racial makeup of the county was 22.4% White, 71.4% Black or African American, 0.7% American Indian and Alaska Native, 0.1% Asian, 0.1% Native Hawaiian and Pacific Islander, 2.9% from some other race, and 2.4% from two or more races. Hispanic or Latino residents of any race comprised 4.9% of the population.

0.0% of residents lived in urban areas, while 100.0% lived in rural areas.

There were 3,928 households in the county, of which 27.8% had children under the age of 18 living with them and 45.9% had a female householder with no spouse or partner present. About 39.6% of all households were made up of individuals and 16.7% had someone living alone who was 65 years of age or older.

There were 4,516 housing units, of which 13.0% were vacant. Among occupied housing units, 67.2% were owner-occupied and 32.8% were renter-occupied. The homeowner vacancy rate was 0.9% and the rental vacancy rate was 5.0%.

=== 2010 census ===
As of the 2010 United States census, there were 10,914 people in the county. 70.2% were Black or African American, 23.0% White, 0.4% Pacific Islander, 0.2% Native American, 0.2% Asian, 5.2% of some other race and 0.8% of two or more races. 7.1% were Hispanic or Latino (of any race).

=== 2000 census ===
As of the 2000 United States census, there were 11,714 people, 3,986 households, and 2,730 families in the county. The population density was 19 people per square mile (7.3 people/km^{2}). There were 4,727 housing units at an average density of 8 units per square mile (3.1 units/km^{2}). The racial makeup of the county was 73.11% Black or African American, 25.25% White, 0.38% Native American, 0.18% Asian, 0.02% Pacific Islander, 0.37% from other races, and 0.70% from two or more races. 2.75% of the population were Hispanic or Latino of any race.

There were 3,986 households, out of which 33.50% had children under the age of 18 living with them, 35.50% were married couples living together, 28.20% had a female householder with no husband present, and 31.50% were non-families. 28.90% of all households were made up of individuals, and 12.30% had someone living alone who was 65 years of age or older. The average household size was 2.56 and the average family size was 3.13.

The county population contained 26.10% under the age of 18, 10.30% from 18 to 24, 29.30% from 25 to 44, 21.20% from 45 to 64, and 13.20% who were 65 years of age or older. The median age was 35 years. For every 100 females there were 110.20 males. For every 100 females age 18 and over, there were 113.40 males.

The median income for a household in the county was $20,605, and the median income for a family was $23,990. Males had a median income of $22,560 versus $19,069 for females. The per capita income for the county was $10,163. About 29.80% of families and 33.50% of the population were below the poverty line, including 44.70% of those under age 18 and 29.10% of those age 65 or over.

== Education ==
Bullock County contains one public school district. There are approximately 1,400 students in public PK-12 schools in Bullock County.

=== Districts ===
School districts include:

- Bullock County School District

== Government and infrastructure ==
Bullock County is powerfully Democratic. It was one of only six Wallace counties (Note: The others were the fellow Alabama counties of Lowndes and Wilcox with similarly delayed black registration after 1965; and the white majority, historically secessionist Middle Tennessee trio of Houston County, Perry County, and Stewart County.) to vote for George McGovern against Richard Nixon's 3,000-plus-county landslide of 1972 and it was only one of nine counties to back Goldwater and McGovern, all of which are located in the Deep South. (Note: The other counties to vote for both Goldwater and McGovern were the nearby "Black Belt" counties of Greene, Lowndes, Sumter, and Wilcox in Alabama, the majority-black Mississippi counties of Claiborne, Holmes, and Jefferson, and West Feliciana Parish, Louisiana)

United States presidential election results for Bullock County, Alabama
Year	Republican		Democratic		Third party(ies)	
Year	No.	%	No.	%	No.	%
1868	2,103	56.28%	1,634	43.72%	0	0.00%
1872	3,101	71.68%	1,225	28.32%	0	0.00%
1876	959	37.97%	1,567	62.03%	0	0.00%
1880	656	84.10%	124	15.90%	0	0.00%
1884	296	33.67%	580	65.98%	3	0.34%
1888	465	39.37%	716	60.63%	0	0.00%
1892	75	2.20%	1,844	54.20%	1,483	43.59%
1896	749	27.11%	1,867	67.57%	147	5.32%
1900	269	14.42%	1,586	84.99%	11	0.59%
1904	0	0.00%	726	99.73%	2	0.27%
1908	10	1.26%	782	98.74%	0	0.00%
1912	4	0.54%	736	99.19%	2	0.27%
1916	4	0.53%	743	99.20%	2	0.27%
1920	2	0.23%	877	99.66%	1	0.11%
1924	8	1.04%	763	98.83%	1	0.13%
1928	249	26.27%	699	73.73%	0	0.00%
1932	12	1.18%	1,004	98.72%	1	0.10%
1936	5	0.42%	1,188	99.50%	1	0.08%
1940	18	1.36%	1,301	98.64%	0	0.00%
1944	24	2.22%	1,056	97.78%	0	0.00%
1948	10	1.24%	0	0.00%	799	98.76%
1952	442	32.50%	918	67.50%	0	0.00%
1956	304	24.28%	812	64.86%	136	10.86%
1960	412	35.09%	757	64.48%	5	0.43%
1964	1,516	57.64%	0	0.00%	1,114	42.36%
1968	190	4.37%	1,964	45.18%	2,193	50.45%
1972	2,178	47.44%	2,321	50.56%	92	2.00%
1976	1,482	29.10%	3,536	69.44%	74	1.45%
1980	1,446	25.65%	3,960	70.25%	231	4.10%
1984	1,697	32.02%	3,537	66.75%	65	1.23%
1988	1,421	31.00%	3,122	68.11%	41	0.89%
1992	1,253	26.02%	3,259	67.67%	304	6.31%
1996	1,154	26.32%	3,078	70.21%	152	3.47%
2000	1,433	29.22%	3,395	69.23%	76	1.55%
2004	1,494	31.67%	3,210	68.05%	13	0.28%
2008	1,391	25.69%	4,011	74.07%	13	0.24%
2012	1,251	23.51%	4,061	76.31%	10	0.19%
2016	1,140	24.20%	3,530	74.95%	40	0.85%
2020	1,146	24.84%	3,446	74.70%	21	0.46%
2024	1,101	26.78%	2,983	72.56%	27	0.66%

United States Senate election results for Bullock County, Alabama2
Year	Republican		Democratic		Third party(ies)	
Year	No.	%	No.	%	No.	%
2020	1,108	24.09%	3,490	75.87%	2	0.04%

United States Senate election results for Bullock County, Alabama3
Year	Republican		Democratic		Third party(ies)	
Year	No.	%	No.	%	No.	%
2022	785	29.69%	1,827	69.10%	32	1.21%

Alabama Gubernatorial election results for Bullock County
Year	Republican		Democratic		Third party(ies)	
Year	No.	%	No.	%	No.	%
2022	802	30.23%	1,806	68.07%	45	1.70%

Alabama Department of Corrections operates the Bullock Correctional Facility in an unincorporated area in the county.

== Climate ==
Bullock County

Climate chart (precipitation, max. and min. temperature)
J	F	M	A	M	J	J	A	S	O	N	D
116 12 3	242 14 4	158 21 8	156 23 12	101 26 16	121 26 19	204 27 21	127 26 20	92 25 18	45 22 12	55 18 7	183 13 5
- █ Average max. and min. temperatures in °C
- █ Precipitation totals in mm
Imperial conversion
J	F	M	A	M	J	J	A	S	O	N	D
4.6 54 37	9.5 57 39	6.2 70 46	6.1 73 54	4 79 61	4.8 79 66	8 81 70	5 79 68	3.6 77 64	1.8 72 54	2.2 64 45	7.2 55 41
- █ Average max. and min. temperatures in °F
- █ Precipitation totals in inches

== See also ==
- National Register of Historic Places listings in Bullock County, Alabama
- Properties on the Alabama Register of Landmarks and Heritage in Bullock County, Alabama
