= List of tornadoes in the outbreak of April 14–16, 2011 =

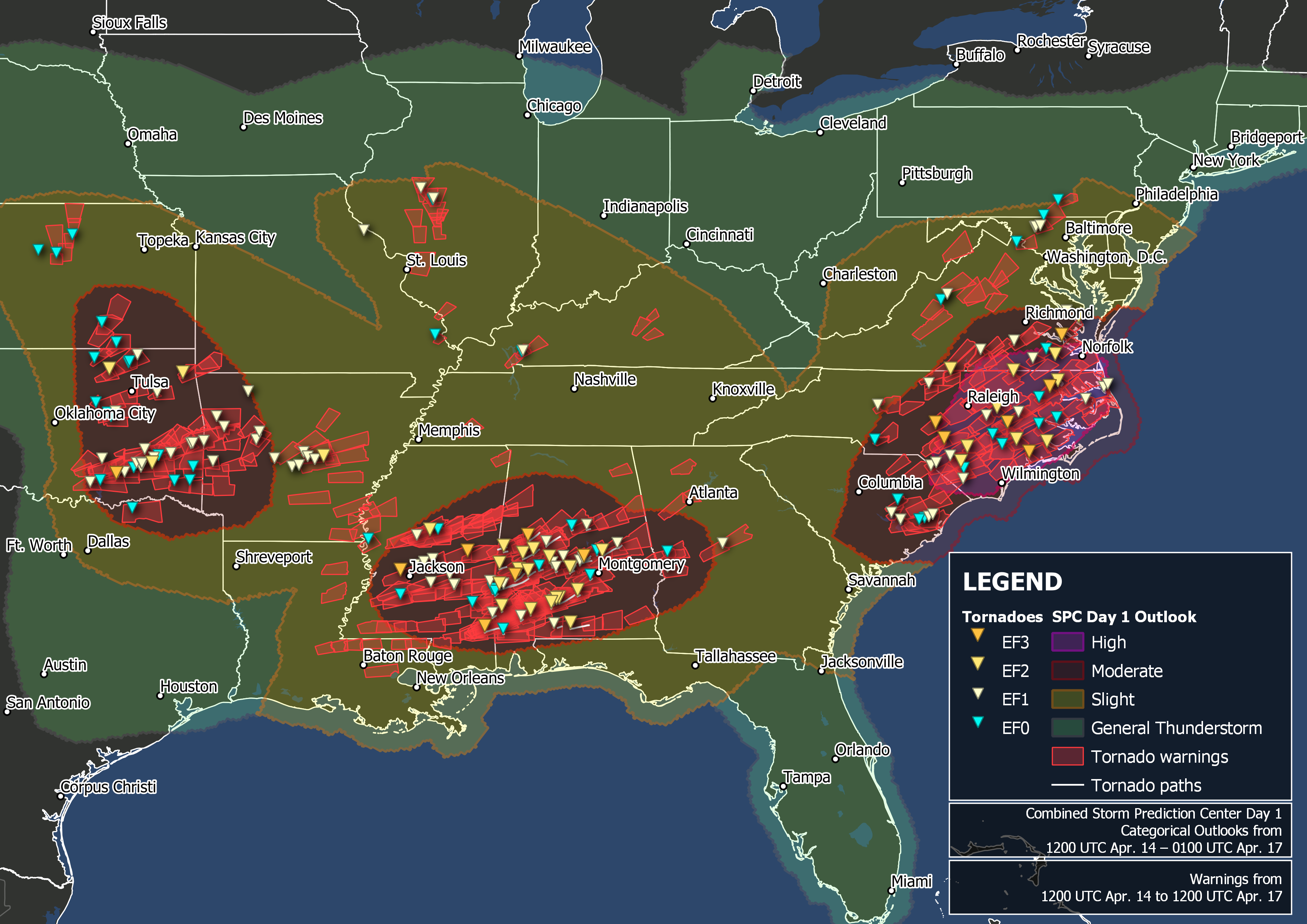
Map of confirmed tornadoes and tornado warnings from April 14–16 during the outbreak

This is a list of tornadoes confirmed that occurred during the tornado outbreak of April 14–16, 2011.

== Confirmed tornadoes ==
Daily statistics
| Date | Total | EF0 | EF1 | EF2 | EF3 | EF4 | EF5 | Deaths | Injuries |
|---|---|---|---|---|---|---|---|---|---|
| April 14 | 46 | 20 | 22 | 3 | 1 | 0 | 0 | 2 | 48 |
| April 15 | 75 | 16 | 34 | 19 | 6 | 0 | 0 | 10 | 60 |
| April 16 | 58 | 16 | 25 | 11 | 6 | 0 | 0 | 26 | 480 |
| Total | 179 | 52 | 81 | 33 | 13 | 0 | 0 | 38 | 588 |

=== April 14 event ===
Confirmed tornadoes by Enhanced Fujita rating
| EFU | EF0 | EF1 | EF2 | EF3 | EF4 | EF5 | Total |
|---|---|---|---|---|---|---|---|
| 0 | 20 | 22 | 3 | 1 | 0 | 0 | 46 |

List of confirmed tornadoes – Thursday, April 14, 2011 (Note: All dates are based on the local time zone where the tornado touched down; however, all times are in Coordinated Universal Time and dates are split at midnight CDT for consistency.)
| EF# | Location | County / Parish | State | Start Coord. | Time (UTC) | Path length | Max width | Damage (Note: All damage totals are in 2011 USD unless otherwise stated.) |
|---|---|---|---|---|---|---|---|---|
| EF0 | ENE of Burbank | Osage | OK | 36.7033°N 96.7060°W | 21:12–21:13 | 0.4 mi (640 m) | 40 yd (37 m) | $0 |
| EF0 | Damage limited to a few trees. | | | | | | | |
| EF0 | NW of Stroud | Lincoln | OK | 35.7767°N 96.6737°W | 21:42 | 0.3 mi (480 m) | 40 yd (37 m) | $0 |
| EF0 | Brief tornado over an open field with no damage. | | | | | | | |
| EF0 | S of Tescott | Saline | KS | 38.9278°N 97.8638°W | 21:45–21:50 | 1.65 mi (2.66 km) | 60 yd (55 m) | $45,000 |
| EF0 | A shed was blown 25 feet (7.6 m) to the northeast and destroyed, and a home sustained roof and soffit damage. | | | | | | | |
| EF2 | N of Hominy | Osage | OK | 36.4523°N 96.3937°W | 22:00–22:03 | 1 mi (1.6 km) | 275 yd (251 m) | $25,000 |
| EF2 | A home and an oil pump repair company housed in a metal building were badly damaged. Trees and power poles were snapped as well. The tornado was witnessed by storm chasers. | | | | | | | |
| EF0 | NE of Cambridge (1st tornado) | Cowley | KS | 37.4400°N 96.5500°W | 22:02–22:06 | 2.17 mi (3.49 km) | 125 yd (114 m) | $0 |
| EF0 | Tornado remained over open country and caused no damage. | | | | | | | |
| EF0 | NE of Elgin | Chautauqua | KS | 37.0200°N 96.2500°W | 22:16–22:18 | 0.5 mi (0.80 km) | 60 yd (55 m) | $0 |
| EF0 | Brief touchdown over open field with no damage. | | | | | | | |
| EF0 | SE of New Cambria | Saline | KS | 38.8700°N 97.4900°W | 22:23–22:25 | 0.43 mi (690 m) | 60 yd (55 m) | $0 |
| EF0 | Brief rope tornado with no damage. | | | | | | | |
| EF1 | SSW of Stonewall | Pontotoc | OK | 34.6166°N 96.5468°W | 22:24–22:25 | 1 mi (1.6 km) | 50 yd (46 m) | $8,000 |
| EF1 | Numerous trees were snapped, one of which damaged a car. | | | | | | | |
| EF0 | SSW of Welty | Okfuskee | OK | 35.5665°N 96.4272°W | 22:38 | 0.2 mi (320 m) | 50 yd (46 m) | $0 |
| EF0 | Brief tornado touchdown with no damage. | | | | | | | |
| EF0 | W of Ochelata | Washington | OK | 36.6000°N 95.9980°W | 22:39 | 0.1 mi (160 m) | 50 yd (46 m) | $0 |
| EF0 | Brief tornado touchdown with no damage witnessed by KOTV storm chasers. | | | | | | | |
| EF0 | N of Ochelata | Washington | OK | 36.6290°N 95.9800°W | 22:44 | 0.1 mi (160 m) | 50 yd (46 m) | $0 |
| EF0 | Emergency management spotters observed a brief tornado with no damage. | | | | | | | |
| EF1 | NNW of Madill to SSW of Milburn | Marshall, Johnston | OK | 34.1301°N 96.7901°W | 23:03–23:25 | 14 mi (23 km) | 300 yd (270 m) | Unknown |
| EF1 | Several structures sustained damage in Marshall County before the tornado entered Johnston County and crossed Lake Texoma in the Tishomingo National Wildlife Refuge before lifting. Many trees and power poles were downed along the path. | | | | | | | |
| EF1 | WSW of Okfuskee to SW of Beggs | Okfuskee, Okmulgee | OK | 35.5880°N 96.2670°W | 23:05–23:26 | 11.4 mi (18.3 km) | 100 yd (91 m) | $0 |
| EF1 | Many large trees were either snapped or uprooted as the tornado remained over mostly open land. | | | | | | | |
| EF1 | ESE of Dewey | Washington, Nowata | OK | 36.7645°N 95.8126°W | 23:11–23:14 | 1.6 mi (2.6 km) | 200 yd (180 m) | $20,000 |
| EF1 | Several houses were damaged, a fifth wheel was overturned, and numerous trees were downed. | | | | | | | |
| EF0 | NE of Cambridge (2nd tornado) | Cowley | KS | 37.4400°N 96.5500°W | 23:11–23:12 | 0.24 mi (390 m) | 50 yd (46 m) | $0 |
| EF0 | Brief touchdown in a remote area with no damage. | | | | | | | |
| EF0 | SW of Broughton | Clay | KS | 39.2500°N 97.1600°W | 23:12 | 0.1 mi (160 m) | 25 yd (23 m) | $0 |
| EF0 | Brief rope tornado with no damage. | | | | | | | |
| EF0 | SSW of Milburn | Johnston | OK | 34.1731°N 96.5835°W | 23:25 | 0.2 mi (320 m) | 100 yd (91 m) | $0 |
| EF0 | Brief tornado touchdown occurred just to the south of the 23:03 UTC Madill EF1 tornado. No damage was observed. | | | | | | | |
| EF0 | NE of Castle | Okfuskee | OK | 35.4854°N 96.3612°W | 23:33 | 0.1 mi (160 m) | 50 yd (46 m) | $0 |
| EF0 | Brief tornado touchdown with no damage observed by KOCO storm chasers. | | | | | | | |
| EF1 | S of Bache | Pittsburg | OK | 34.8108°N 95.6640°W | 00:14–00:25 | 5.5 mi (8.9 km) | 300 yd (270 m) | $0 |
| EF1 | Large trees were either snapped or uprooted to the west of Haileyville. | | | | | | | |
| EF3 | WSW of Tushka to Atoka to E of Stringtown | Atoka | OK | 34.2923°N 96.2509°W | 00:20–00:50 | 17 mi (27 km) | 1,320 yd (1,210 m) | Unknown |
| EF3 | 2 deaths – A large multiple-vortex tornado, which at times appeared to be a double tornado, either heavily damaged or destroyed more than 150 homes and businesses in Tushka and Atoka and caused minor damage to many more. A large industrial warehouse was destroyed, vehicles were tossed and flipped, and a school in Tushka was destroyed. One home was shifted 6 to 8 feet (1.8 to 2.4 m) off its foundation. Many trees were downed along the path. The two fatalities occurred in a mobile home west of Tushka; 40 additional people were injured. | | | | | | | |
| EF1 | N of Tushka | Atoka | OK | 34.3366°N 96.2186°W | 00:21–00:28 | 4 mi (6.4 km) | 100 yd (91 m) | $10,000 |
| EF1 | A satellite tornado to the north of the Atoka EF3 caused tree damage. | | | | | | | |
| EF2 | SSE of Eucha | Delaware | OK | 36.3735°N 94.8743°W | 00:47–00:48 | 0.5 mi (0.80 km) | 100 yd (91 m) | $100,000 |
| EF2 | A mobile home was destroyed and several others were heavily damaged. Trees were either snapped or uprooted, and power lines were knocked down. Three people were injured in the destroyed mobile home. | | | | | | | |
| EF0 | S of Redden | Atoka, Pushmataha | OK | 34.4298°N 95.8903°W | 01:04–01:11 | 7 mi (11 km) | 125 yd (114 m) | $0 |
| EF0 | A cone tornado observed by storm chasers remained over open country, causing no damage. | | | | | | | |
| EF0 | S of Daisy | Pushmataha | OK | 34.4402°N 95.7424°W | 01:12 | 0.1 mi (160 m) | 50 yd (46 m) | $0 |
| EF0 | A brief tornado confirmed by storm spotter along the Indian Nation Turnpike with no damage. | | | | | | | |
| EF1 | N of Jumbo | Pushmataha | OK | 34.4419°N 95.7417°W | 01:12–01:15 | 3 mi (4.8 km) | 400 yd (370 m) | $10,000 |
| EF1 | Trees and power poles were downed. | | | | | | | |
| EF1 | NW of Wagoner | Wagoner | OK | 35.9862°N 95.4067°W | 01:18–01:22 | 1.8 mi (2.9 km) | 290 yd (270 m) | $40,000 |
| EF1 | A house was damaged, several outbuildings were destroyed, and a number of trees were uprooted. | | | | | | | |
| EF1 | W of Talihina | Latimer, Le Flore | OK | 34.7298°N 95.1245°W | 01:28–01:37 | 4.6 mi (7.4 km) | 600 yd (550 m) | $25,000 |
| EF1 | A tied-down mobile home and a house were damaged, a barn was severely damaged, and numerous trees were either snapped or uprooted. | | | | | | | |
| EF2 | SW of Clayton | Pushmataha | OK | 34.5092°N 95.5091°W | 01:35–01:47 | 7 mi (11 km) | 1,000 yd (910 m) | $0 |
| EF2 | Many large trees were downed as the large tornado moved through the Stanley community; damage was consistent with a low-end EF2 tornado. | | | | | | | |
| EF1 | SE of Atoka | Atoka | OK | 34.3391°N 96.0804°W | 01:36–01:39 | 2 mi (3.2 km) | 400 yd (370 m) | $20,000 |
| EF1 | Tornado touched down shortly after the earlier Atoka/Tushka EF3 wedge, just to the south of that path. Numerous trees and power lines were downed. | | | | | | | |
| EF1 | WSW of Daisy | Atoka | OK | 34.5254°N 95.8314°W | 01:46–01:51 | 4 mi (6.4 km) | 500 yd (460 m) | $30,000 |
| EF1 | A barn was destroyed, and numerous large trees were either snapped or uprooted. | | | | | | | |
| EF1 | NW of Clayton | Pushmataha | OK | 34.6365°N 95.4727°W | 01:50–01:51 | 1 mi (1.6 km) | 75 yd (69 m) | $0 |
| EF1 | Several trees were blown down on the south side of Sardis Lake. | | | | | | | |
| EF1 | S of Daisy to SE of Weathers | Atoka, Pushmataha, Pittsburg | OK | 34.5284°N 95.7400°W | 01:58–02:16 | 14.3 mi (23.0 km) | 1,100 yd (1,000 m) | $50,000 |
| EF1 | Large wedge tornado caused roof damaged to at least two homes and major structural damage to a barn. Many large trees were snapped or uprooted along the path. | | | | | | | |
| EF1 | SE of Daisy | Atoka | OK | 34.5134°N 95.7228°W | 01:59–02:00 | 0.5 mi (0.80 km) | 125 yd (114 m) | $10,000 |
| EF1 | Satellite tornado to the 0158 UTC Daisy tornado snapped or uprooted numerous trees. | | | | | | | |
| EF0 | W of Yanush | Latimer | OK | 34.6850°N 95.3778°W | 02:08–02:22 | 6 mi (9.7 km) | 125 yd (114 m) | $0 |
| EF0 | Tornado developed over Sardis Lake and moved northeast. Trees were uprooted, and large branches were snapped off. | | | | | | | |
| EF1 | SSE of Wister to S of Poteau | Le Flore | OK | 34.9285°N 94.7080°W | 02:23–02:37 | 7 mi (11 km) | 440 yd (400 m) | $40,000 |
| EF1 | A mobile home was rolled, a site-built house sustained roof damage, and numerous large trees were snapped or uprooted. Three people were injured in the mobile home. | | | | | | | |
| EF1 | W of Howe | Le Flore | OK | 34.9399°N 94.6715°W | 02:35–02:37 | 1.5 mi (2.4 km) | 300 yd (270 m) | $10,000 |
| EF1 | An anticyclonic tornado damaged a barn and either snapped or uprooted trees. This tornado occurred simultaneously and just to the south of the 0223 UTC Wister tornado. | | | | | | | |
| EF1 | SW of Hartford | Sebastian | AR | 34.9800°N 94.4419°W | 03:10–03:11 | 0.5 mi (0.80 km) | 150 yd (140 m) | $100,000 |
| EF1 | A large barn was destroyed, and trees were uprooted. | | | | | | | |
| EF0 | S of Smithville | McCurtain | OK | 34.4545°N 94.6623°W | 03:33–03:36 | 1.7 mi (2.7 km) | 75 yd (69 m) | $500 |
| EF0 | A home sustained minor roof damage, and several trees and power lines were downed. | | | | | | | |
| EF1 | NW of Dyer | Crawford | AR | 35.4893°N 94.1774°W | 03:35–03:44 | 3 mi (4.8 km) | 250 yd (230 m) | $15,000 |
| EF1 | Two houses sustained roof damage, a barn suffered structural damage, and large trees were either uprooted or snapped. | | | | | | | |
| EF0 | N of Honey Grove | Fannin | TX | 33.5969°N 95.9213°W | 03:46–03:50 | 1.53 mi (2.46 km) | 100 yd (91 m) | $35,000 |
| EF0 | Several structures and trees were damaged. | | | | | | | |
| EF0 | SE of Ringold | McCurtain | OK | 34.1600°N 95.0500°W | 04:02–04:05 | 4.57 mi (7.35 km) | 75 yd (69 m) | $10,000 |
| EF0 | A house sustained minor roof damage, a barn was destroyed, and numerous trees were either snapped or uprooted. | | | | | | | |
| EF1 | SW of Mena | Polk | AR | 34.5614°N 94.2533°W | 04:07–04:08 | 0.53 mi (0.85 km) | 75 yd (69 m) | $350,000 |
| EF1 | A Frito-Lay distribution warehouse was destroyed, a barn was damaged, and numerous trees were downed, one of which fell on a house. | | | | | | | |
| EF1 | SE of Charleston to SE of Branch | Franklin | AR | 35.2759°N 94.0217°W | 04:08–04:16 | 4.8 mi (7.7 km) | 350 yd (320 m) | $30,000 |
| EF1 | A mobile home was rolled over, two homes sustained roof damage, and two chicken houses were heavily damaged. A number of trees were either snapped or uprooted. Two people were injured in the mobile home. | | | | | | | |
| EF1 | SE of Danville | Yell | AR | 35.0095°N 93.3579°W | 04:12–04:13 | 0.78 mi (1.26 km) | 25 yd (23 m) | $25,000 |
| EF1 | A barn was destroyed, farm equipment was damaged, and trees were downed. | | | | | | | |
| EF1 | NW of Chickalah | Yell | AR | 35.1720°N 93.2940°W | 04:35–04:38 | 2.1 mi (3.4 km) | 75 yd (69 m) | $75,000 |
| EF1 | A mobile home was destroyed, and numerous trees were blown over. | | | | | | | |
| EF0 | SW of Hochatown | McCurtain | OK | 34.1700°N 94.7320°W | 04:37–04:38 | 1.23 mi (1.98 km) | 75 yd (69 m) | $0 |
| EF0 | Numerous trees were snapped or uprooted at Beavers Bend State Park. | | | | | | | |

=== April 15 event ===
Confirmed tornadoes by Enhanced Fujita rating
| EFU | EF0 | EF1 | EF2 | EF3 | EF4 | EF5 | Total |
|---|---|---|---|---|---|---|---|
| 0 | 16 | 34 | 19 | 6 | 0 | 0 | 75 |

List of confirmed tornadoes – Friday, April 15, 2011
| EF# | Location | County / Parish | State | Start Coord. | Time (UTC) | Path length | Max width | Damage |
|---|---|---|---|---|---|---|---|---|
| EF1 | ESE of Loy | Madison | AR | 36.0066°N 93.5247°W | 05:10–05:11 | 0.5 mi (0.80 km) | 100 yd (91 m) | $15,000 |
| EF1 | A house was damaged, and trees were uprooted. | | | | | | | |
| EF1 | N of Fountain Lake | Garland, Saline | AR | 34.6206°N 92.9800°W | 06:13–06:25 | 7.31 mi (11.76 km) | 250 yd (230 m) | $240,000 |
| EF1 | Tornado moved through the eastern part of Hot Springs Village, blowing down hundreds of trees, some of which landed on houses. A couple of barns and sheds had roof damage, and one house had its porch and part of its roof blown off. | | | | | | | |
| EF1 | E of Traskwood | Saline | AR | 34.4510°N 92.6176°W | 06:38–06:41 | 2.95 mi (4.75 km) | 250 yd (230 m) | $40,000 |
| EF1 | Several houses sustained mainly roof damage, a barn was destroyed (the barn's roof was thrown over 100 yards (91 m)), and numerous large trees were either snapped or uprooted. | | | | | | | |
| EF1 | SW of Sardis to SSE of Wrightsville | Saline, Pulaski | AR | 34.4806°N 92.4726°W | 06:47–07:05 | 16.85 mi (27.12 km) | 350 yd (320 m) | $775,000 |
| EF1 | A house on U.S. Highway 167 sustained roof and chimney damage; this same house had been damaged by a tornado 30 years prior as well. A mobile home had its roof and porch blown off, a country club building also had its roof blown off (causing significant water damage in the aftermath), a few other homes had shingles blown off, and many trees and power lines were downed, with several trees falling on houses. | | | | | | | |
| EF1 | Little Rock | Pulaski | AR | 34.7501°N 92.3773°W | 06:57–07:01 | 3.94 mi (6.34 km) | 475 yd (434 m) | $38,500,000 |
| EF1 | 2 deaths – Tornado was entirely within the city limits of Little Rock, west of downtown. Two homes were destroyed, 36 suffered major damage, 49 sustained minor damage, and 37 others were affected in a slight way. Some of the damage was due to the tornado, such as shingle loss, but the damage was primarily caused by falling trees, which fell onto homes and vehicles and blocked streets. The two deaths occurred from a tree falling into a home. A shed and a natural gas line were pulled up by the roots of two large trees that were blown down. Two other people were injured. | | | | | | | |
| EF1 | SW of Sweet Home to E of College Station | Pulaski | AR | 34.6586°N 92.2941°W | 07:01–07:11 | 6.57 mi (10.57 km) | 200 yd (180 m) | $2,000,000 |
| EF1 | Two industrial buildings sustained heavy roof and wall damage at the Port of Little Rock, and many trees and power lines were downed. | | | | | | | |
| EF1 | S of Scott | Pulaski, Lonoke | AR | 34.5988°N 92.1469°W | 07:09–07:16 | 6.79 mi (10.93 km) | 200 yd (180 m) | $455,000 |
| EF1 | Tornado touched down near an Arkansas River levee and moved northeast, tracking through Land's End Plantation, where a semi trailer was overturned, a cotton gin was destroyed, and a 150 year-old pecan orchard was severely damaged. Past the plantation, a mobile home was destroyed, a second mobile home was knocked off its foundation, a large propane tank was ripped from its foundation, allowing the propane to escape, outbuildings were damaged, and many large trees were blown down. One person was badly injured in the destroyed mobile home. | | | | | | | |
| EF2 | S of Lonoke | Lonoke | AR | 34.6494°N 91.9650°W | 07:17–07:26 | 6.98 mi (11.23 km) | 200 yd (180 m) | $20,050,000 |
| EF2 | Trees, power lines, and power poles were blown down, and 51 large steel transmission towers owned by Entergy were destroyed. Several of these towers and cables fell on and blocked roads, and one tower fell into a pond on a fish farm. | | | | | | | |
| EF0 | NNE of Mayersville | Issaquena | MS | 32.9579°N 91.0402°W | 11:26–11:27 | 1.71 mi (2.75 km) | 75 yd (69 m) | $5,000 |
| EF0 | A house and a mobile home sustained roof damage, trees were downed, and large tree limbs were snapped off. | | | | | | | |
| EF0 | SW of Whistler | Wayne | MS | 31.6500°N 88.8900°W | 15:11–15:12 | 0.01 mi (16 m) | 50 yd (46 m) | $0 |
| EF0 | Brief tornado confirmed by the local EMA with no damage. | | | | | | | |
| EF3 | SW of Clinton to Northern Jackson | Hinds | MS | 32.2908°N 90.3754°W | 15:51–16:17 | 16.53 mi (26.60 km) | 528 yd (483 m) | $8,000,000 |
| EF3 | Severe damage in the area of Clinton and western Jackson, with many houses and businesses being damaged or destroyed and thousands of trees being either snapped or uprooted. Malaco Records, one of the top Blues/Gospel/Soul labels in the country, was destroyed by the tornado. Vehicles were picked up, tossed, flipped, and smashed as well, and numerous power lines and poles were downed. The EF3 rating was warranted due to the degree of home destruction near U.S. Highway 80 in Clinton. Ten people were injured. | | | | | | | |
| EF1 | NW of Carlton | Clarke | AL | 31.3645°N 87.8856°W | 16:20–16:27 | 3.28 mi (5.28 km) | 500 yd (460 m) | $3,102,000 |
| EF1 | Hundreds of trees were blown down on the Fred T. Stimpson State Game Preserve, several power poles were snapped, and a storage shed was destroyed. | | | | | | | |
| EF1 | E of Ridgeland | Madison, Rankin | MS | 32.4159°N 90.0773°W | 16:22–16:35 | 7.41 mi (11.93 km) | 200 yd (180 m) | $6,000 |
| EF1 | Tornado developed as a waterspout over Ross Barnett Reservoir. Coming ashore on the east side of the lake, it knocked down several trees, with some falling on trailers in a hunting camp. It may have been stronger over water, but the damage survey could not confirm stronger intensity. | | | | | | | |
| EF0 | W of Melvin | Choctaw | AL | 31.9270°N 88.4690°W | 16:24–16:25 | 0.12 mi (0.19 km) | 50 yd (46 m) | $60,000 |
| EF0 | A brief tornado near the Hunt Oil Refinery produced minor damage to outbuildings and snapped trees. | | | | | | | |
| EF0 | E of Evansboro to NW of Toxey | Choctaw | AL | 31.8810°N 88.4200°W | 16:26–16:36 | 4.65 mi (7.48 km) | 100 yd (91 m) | $40,000 |
| EF0 | Two mobile homes were damaged. | | | | | | | |
| EF1 | State Line, MS to SW of Laton Hill, AL | Greene (MS), Wayne (MS), Washington (AL) | MS, AL | 31.4290°N 88.4730°W | 16:41–16:50 | 5.14 mi (8.27 km) | 200 yd (180 m) | $312,000 |
| EF1 | A home had a collapsed chimney and garage damage, a manufactured home was destroyed, and several other homes and buildings, including an abandoned church, sustained minor roof and structural damage. Many trees were twisted, snapped, or uprooted. | | | | | | | |
| EF1 | Sand Hill to Eureka | Rankin | MS | 32.4800°N 89.8900°W | 16:43–16:53 | 7.59 mi (12.21 km) | 200 yd (180 m) | $400,000 |
| EF1 | A tornado touched down near Pisgah and moved northeast, lifting at the Scott County line. A mobile home was damaged, a site-built home sustained roof damage, two outbuildings were heavily damaged, and two semi trailers were overturned. Numerous trees were either snapped or uprooted. | | | | | | | |
| EF1 | SSW of Butler to Nanafalia | Choctaw, Marengo | AL | 32.0297°N 88.2463°W | 16:48–17:21 | 16.71 mi (26.89 km) | 200 yd (180 m) | $40,000 |
| EF1 | Numerous trees were blown down, one of which destroyed a manufactured home and briefly trapped three people. | | | | | | | |
| EF1 | SSE of Ludlow to NW of Lena | Scott, Leake | MS | 32.5400°N 89.7100°W | 16:58–17:07 | 6.95 mi (11.18 km) | 200 yd (180 m) | $875,000 |
| EF1 | A barn was destroyed, a mobile home and several sheds were heavily damaged, and numerous trees were downed, with at least two falling on homes and causing roof damage. | | | | | | | |
| EF2 | NNE of Yarbo | Washington | AL | 31.5510°N 88.2820°W | 17:04–17:06 | 0.9 mi (1.4 km) | 150 yd (140 m) | $50,000 |
| EF2 | A wood frame house was lifted off its concrete masonry foundation and rolled about 100 yards (91 m) as it disintegrated. Numerous trees were snapped and twisted as well. One person was seriously injured inside the home. | | | | | | | |
| EF3 | SW of Philadelphia, MS to De Kalb, MS to ENE of Geiger, AL | Neshoba (MS), Kemper (MS), Sumter (AL) | MS, AL | 32.6882°N 88.9872°W | 17:53–19:05 | 48.52 mi (78.09 km) | 1,760 yd (1,610 m) | $19,920,000 |
| EF3 | See section on this tornado – Five people were injured. | | | | | | | |
| EF1 | ENE of Bowling Green | Pike | MO | 39.3361°N 91.1328°W | 18:35–18:40 | 3.01 mi (4.84 km) | 50 yd (46 m) | Unknown |
| EF1 | A double-wide mobile home lost two outside walls, with debris scattered several yards downstream, and a swing set was thrown into a tree. Two large doors on a machine shed were bowed outward, and a nearby SUV was tossed into a pond. A second machine shed was completely destroyed, with steel from the shed being wrapped around nearby trees, and some flatbed trailers sustained minor damage. Numerous trees were downed along the intermittent path. | | | | | | | |
| EF0 | SSE of Hazlehurst | Copiah | MS | 31.8108°N 90.3761°W | 18:39–18:41 | 1.03 mi (1.66 km) | 200 yd (180 m) | $2,000 |
| EF0 | Trees were uprooted or tree limbs were snapped. | | | | | | | |
| EF1 | ESE of Puckett | Rankin, Smith | MS | 32.0589°N 89.7478°W | 18:47–18:52 | 3.75 mi (6.04 km) | 100 yd (91 m) | $18,000 |
| EF1 | A barn had part of its roof blown off, and many trees were snapped or uprooted. | | | | | | | |
| EF1 | SE of Lexington | Holmes | MS | 33.0327°N 90.0380°W | 18:54–19:01 | 6.12 mi (9.85 km) | 150 yd (140 m) | $510,000 |
| EF1 | Many trees were snapped or uprooted along the path. | | | | | | | |
| EF2 | NE of Durant | Attala | MS | 33.1261°N 89.7665°W | 19:19–19:25 | 3.7 mi (6.0 km) | 200 yd (180 m) | $35,000 |
| EF2 | Strong tornado struck the Possumneck community, where a mobile home was obliterated and scattered over 150 yards (140 m) away. Numerous trees were downed. Two people were seriously injured, having been thrown around 75 yards (69 m) from the mobile home. This tornado occurred within the damage path of the long-track EF4 from a year earlier on April 24. | | | | | | | |
| EF1 | NE of Pineville | Smith, Scott, Newton | MS | 32.2200°N 89.3600°W | 19:23–19:34 | 6.87 mi (11.06 km) | 150 yd (140 m) | $84,000 |
| EF1 | A barn sustained minor damage and many trees were snapped or uprooted. | | | | | | | |
| EF0 | ENE of Hesterville | Attala | MS | 33.1600°N 89.6000°W | 19:33–19:38 | 4.48 mi (7.21 km) | 75 yd (69 m) | $1,000 |
| EF0 | A few trees were uprooted. | | | | | | | |
| EF2 | WSW of Gainesville | Sumter | AL | 32.7890°N 88.2410°W | 20:03–20:10 | 4.5 mi (7.2 km) | 200 yd (180 m) | $2,070,000 |
| EF2 | Several homes were damaged, including one that sustained major roof damage, and dozens of trees were snapped or uprooted. | | | | | | | |
| EF1 | NE of Bay Springs (1st tornado) | Jasper | MS | 32.0140°N 89.2538°W | 20:04–20:06 | 1.23 mi (1.98 km) | 440 yd (400 m) | $25,000 |
| EF1 | Trees were knocked down along the path. First of two tornadoes in the area. A home had a tree fall with the first tornado and another with the second tornado two hours later. | | | | | | | |
| EF1 | S of Beatrice | Monroe | AL | 31.6869°N 87.2163°W | 20:06–20:08 | 0.76 mi (1.22 km) | 100 yd (91 m) | $0 |
| EF1 | Numerous trees were snapped or uprooted. | | | | | | | |
| EF3 | ENE of Knoxville to Tuscaloosa | Greene, Tuscaloosa | AL | 33.0120°N 87.7390°W | 20:14–20:45 | 18.73 mi (30.14 km) | 500 yd (460 m) | $7,143,800 |
| EF3 | A low-end EF3 tornado initially touched down just inside Greene County, snapping or uprooting dozens of trees before crossing into Tuscaloosa County. Hundreds more trees were downed and a radio transmission tower was destroyed before the tornado came into range of the ABC 33/40 tower camera in the southern part of town, near the track of the December 2000 tornado. Numerous homes and businesses sustained structural damage in the area of McFarland Mall before the tornado crossed Interstate 20/59 and dissipated to the east of University Mall. This tornado path was just a couple miles south of a much more destructive tornado that struck on April 27. | | | | | | | |
| EF2 | NW of Greensboro | Hale | AL | 32.7285°N 87.6276°W | 20:33–20:37 | 2.2 mi (3.5 km) | 700 yd (640 m) | $374,000 |
| EF2 | Several homes and businesses sustained roof damage and a church sustained significant damage to the windows and one wall. One person remained trapped in an overturned mobile home for several hours but was uninjured. Hundreds of trees were snapped or uprooted, and power lines were downed. | | | | | | | |
| EF2 | E of Cuba to E of York | Sumter | AL | 32.4359°N 88.3288°W | 20:53–21:07 | 8.92 mi (14.36 km) | 200 yd (180 m) | $3,910,000 |
| EF2 | Two homes were damaged, two outbuildings were destroyed, several large trees were also snapped. | | | | | | | |
| EF1 | WSW of Brent to E of West Blocton | Bibb | AL | 32.9040°N 87.3625°W | 21:00–21:34 | 21.77 mi (35.04 km) | 1,760 yd (1,610 m) | $200,000 |
| EF1 | Several houses and mobile homes were damaged, and hundreds of trees were knocked down by a large wedge tornado. | | | | | | | |
| EF1 | ENE of Quitman, MS to NNE of Jachin, AL | Clarke (MS), Choctaw (AL) | MS, AL | 32.0836°N 88.5246°W | 21:08–21:52 | 24.49 mi (39.41 km) | 470 yd (430 m) | $450,000 |
| EF1 | Rain wrapped tornado caused roof damage to a house, heavily damaged two outbuildings, and destroyed a deer stand in Clarke County, and a home in Lisman, Alabama, sustained major structural damage. Many trees and several power lines were downed along the path. | | | | | | | |
| EF2 | ESE of Tishabee to NNE of Forkland | Sumter, Greene | AL | 32.6143°N 87.9539°W | 21:35–21:52 | 8.73 mi (14.05 km) | 325 yd (297 m) | Unknown |
| EF2 | This strong tornado began southwest of a bend in the Tombigbee River in Sumter County, producing EF1 tree damage as it crossed into Greene County. A site-built home lost much of its roof and an attached carport, while a shed was destroyed. A manufactured home nearby was destroyed, with its frame thrown over 100 yd (91 m) and wrapped around a tree. A vacant block church building was leveled, and another manufactured home was flipped, injuring one of its two occupants. The tornado widened to its peak width near a railroad, with debris from damaged structures carried long distances. Additional damage occurred at two churches before the tornado approached US 43, where tree damage continued. Significant tree damage continued north-northeastward until the tornado dissipated. This tornado was officially confirmed in June 2025 based on satellite analysis, a local newspaper article, and social media pictures and videos, as well as a ground survey that retraced the path and interviewed residents who had been directly affected. | | | | | | | |
| EF2 | N of Demopolis to NE of Greensboro | Greene, Hale | AL | 32.6426°N 87.8456°W | 21:44–22:22 | 24.1 mi (38.8 km) | 880 yd (800 m) | $4,351,000 |
| EF2 | Three mobile homes were heavily damaged and tens of thousands of trees were snapped or uprooted along the path. | | | | | | | |
| EF0 | Chaffee | Scott | MO | 37.1800°N 89.6600°W | 21:47 | Unknown | Unknown | Unknown |
| EF0 | A double-wide mobile home was damaged and a shed was destroyed. | | | | | | | |
| EF1 | NE of Bay Springs (2nd tornado) | Jasper | MS | 32.0100°N 89.2693°W | 21:59–22:02 | 1.63 mi (2.62 km) | 880 yd (800 m) | $60,000 |
| EF1 | The roof was blown off a barn and trees were blown down, one of which fell on a house. Second of two tornadoes in the area with overlapping damage. | | | | | | | |
| EF0 | Alabaster | Shelby | AL | 33.2380°N 86.8363°W | 21:59–22:02 | 1.37 mi (2.20 km) | 50 yd (46 m) | $15,250 |
| EF0 | A few trees and tree limbs were downed, with some landing on houses causing minor damage. A church sustained minor roof damage. | | | | | | | |
| EF3 | SW of Myrtlewood to NNW of Linden | Marengo | AL | 32.1899°N 88.0057°W | 22:04–22:28 | 15.33 mi (24.67 km) | 800 yd (730 m) | $3,990,000 |
| EF3 | 1 death – Several dozen home and mobile homes were heavily damaged or destroyed in Myrtlewood, resulting in the fatality. More homes and mobile homes were destroyed in Hilltop, and four people were injured in the area, including two who were injured as the roof and several walls were removed from a two-story home. Many trees were downed along the path. | | | | | | | |
| EF2 | SW of Tunnel Springs | Monroe | AL | 31.6240°N 87.2580°W | 22:11–22:13 | 0.86 mi (1.38 km) | 150 yd (140 m) | $200,000 |
| EF2 | A church was heavily damaged, with complete roof loss and exterior wall damage, and several trees were snapped. | | | | | | | |
| EF2 | NW of Linden | Marengo | AL | 32.3089°N 87.9304°W | 22:19–22:30 | 5.4 mi (8.7 km) | 575 yd (526 m) | $1,020,000 |
| EF2 | The tornado moved through Pin Hook, where several homes sustained significant damage. One home lost its entire roof and had serious exterior wall damage. Many trees were downed along the path. | | | | | | | |
| EF2 | W of Midway to NE of Forest Home | Monroe, Butler | AL | 31.7200°N 87.0950°W | 22:29–23:07 | 22.27 mi (35.84 km) | 300 yd (270 m) | $390,000 |
| EF2 | A church was destroyed, several site-built homes sustained roof damage, and the roof was blown completely off a mobile home. Many trees were downed along the path, with at least one falling on a home. | | | | | | | |
| EF1 | SW of Easton | Mason | IL | 40.2132°N 89.9536°W | 22:30–22:38 | 3.08 mi (4.96 km) | 100 yd (91 m) | $300,000 |
| EF1 | Two houses and several sheds were damaged, an irrigation unit was knocked over, and numerous trees were knocked down. One person was injured by flying glass. | | | | | | | |
| EF2 | ESE of Linden to NE of Dayton | Marengo | AL | 32.2884°N 87.7380°W | 22:35–22:53 | 10.87 mi (17.49 km) | 600 yd (550 m) | $1,830,000 |
| EF2 | Several houses sustained significant roof damage, and hundreds of trees were snapped or uprooted. | | | | | | | |
| EF1 | N of Wilsonville | Shelby | AL | 33.2477°N 86.5256°W | 22:44–22:49 | 4.38 mi (7.05 km) | 100 yd (91 m) | $28,500 |
| EF1 | A home sustained roof damage, a horse trailer was thrown at least 100 yards (91 m), and numerous trees were snapped or uprooted. | | | | | | | |
| EF0 | SE of Uniontown | Perry | AL | 32.4055°N 87.5098°W | 23:00–23:05 | 4.65 mi (7.48 km) | 150 yd (140 m) | $23,000 |
| EF0 | Two outbuildings were heavily damaged, and many trees were snapped or uprooted. | | | | | | | |
| EF2 | SW of Butler to SE of Linden | Choctaw, Marengo | AL | 32.0080°N 88.3310°W | 23:12–00:09 | 38.81 mi (62.46 km) | 800 yd (730 m) | $8,780,000 |
| EF2 | This long-tracked high-end EF2 tornado followed a similar but much longer path than the 16:48 UTC tornado that moved through the same area earlier in the day. Numerous houses sustained roof and structural damage, and mobile homes were heavily damaged or destroyed, including as the tornado moved through Nanafalia. There was extensive tree damage along the path, and several trees fell on homes. | | | | | | | |
| EF0 | NNE of Athens (1st tornado) | Menard | IL | 39.9704°N 89.7098°W | 23:22–23:25 | 1.24 mi (2.00 km) | 50 yd (46 m) | $10,000 |
| EF0 | One house sustained minor window, siding, and gutter damage. | | | | | | | |
| EF1 | NNE of Athens (2nd tornado) | Menard | IL | 39.9988°N 89.6946°W | 23:25–23:31 | 1.72 mi (2.77 km) | 150 yd (140 m) | $450,000 |
| EF1 | A house sustained roof damage, a small garage was destroyed, and several vehicles were damaged. Two trees were knocked down onto a second house, causing severe damage to the roof and interior walls. A semi-trailer was tipped over, and several more trees were downed as well. | | | | | | | |
| EF2 | N of Hamburg | Perry | AL | 32.5666°N 87.2943°W | 23:25–23:27 | 0.8 mi (1.3 km) | 500 yd (460 m) | $38,000 |
| EF2 | A barn sustained roof damage, and many trees were snapped or uprooted. | | | | | | | |
| EF0 | SSE of Hamilton | Harris | GA | 32.6954°N 84.8575°W | 23:50–23:51 | 0.43 mi (690 m) | 50 yd (46 m) | $5,000 |
| EF0 | Brief tornado destroyed a gazebo and a storage shed and snapped about ten trees. | | | | | | | |
| EF1 | NNW of Valley Grande | Dallas | AL | 32.6004°N 87.0091°W | 00:05–00:07 | 0.1 mi (160 m) | 75 yd (69 m) | $20,500 |
| EF1 | A mobile home sustained significant damage, and several trees were downed. | | | | | | | |
| EF0 | SW of Hope Hull | Lowndes | AL | 32.2140°N 86.4519°W | 00:23–00:27 | 2.73 mi (4.39 km) | 75 yd (69 m) | $21,000 |
| EF0 | A few houses sustained minor roof damage, and numerous trees were snapped or uprooted. | | | | | | | |
| EF3 | WSW of Leakesville, MS to W of Deer Park, AL | Greene (MS), Washington (AL) | MS, AL | 31.1311°N 88.6325°W | 00:45–01:15 | 18.3 mi (29.5 km) | 500 yd (460 m) | $13,100,000 |
| EF3 | 4 deaths – Numerous houses, mobile homes and businesses were destroyed, both in Leakesville and in the Deer Park community in Alabama. In Leakesville, 14 businesses were destroyed and 98 houses were damaged: 47 had minor damage, 28 had major damage, and 23 were completely destroyed. Extensive tree damage was noted along the path. One death was in a mobile home in Mississippi, and three were in another mobile home in Alabama; 28 others were injured. | | | | | | | |
| EF1 | N of Marion Junction | Dallas | AL | 32.4700°N 87.2346°W | 00:48–00:50 | 0.18 mi (290 m) | 100 yd (91 m) | $25,000 |
| EF1 | A metal warehouse sustained extensive damage. | | | | | | | |
| EF1 | N of Beloit | Dallas | AL | 32.3776°N 87.1618°W | 01:04–01:07 | 1.64 mi (2.64 km) | 250 yd (230 m) | $70,000 |
| EF1 | A large cattle feeder was destroyed, and hundreds of trees were snapped or uprooted. | | | | | | | |
| EF0 | SW of Cadiz | Trigg | KY | 36.8300°N 87.8700°W | 01:12–01:13 | 0.3 mi (480 m) | 50 yd (46 m) | $8,000 |
| EF0 | Brief tornado snapped or uprooted a few trees. | | | | | | | |
| EF1 | Cadiz | Trigg | KY | 36.8516°N 87.8430°W | 01:14–01:18 | 2.5 mi (4.0 km) | 125 yd (114 m) | $30,000 |
| EF1 | Two houses sustained minor shingle damage. Several trees were snapped or uprooted, one of which pulled an electrical line out of its box. | | | | | | | |
| EF1 | SE of Independence to SE of Billingsley | Autauga | AL | 32.5095°N 86.6680°W | 01:48–01:59 | 7.88 mi (12.68 km) | 200 yd (180 m) | $440,000 |
| EF1 | A mobile home sustained significant damage, the steeple was removed from a church, and numerous trees were snapped or uprooted. | | | | | | | |
| EF1 | SE of Billingsley to E of Marbury | Autauga | AL | 32.5639°N 86.6064°W | 01:56–02:16 | 13.42 mi (21.60 km) | 200 yd (180 m) | $458,000 |
| EF1 | Several structures sustained minor damage, and numerous trees were snapped or uprooted. | | | | | | | |
| EF0 | N of Pine Level | Autauga | AL | 32.5639°N 86.6064°W | 02:06–02:12 | 4.43 mi (7.13 km) | 50 yd (46 m) | $39,800 |
| EF0 | Numerous trees were snapped or uprooted. | | | | | | | |
| EF2 | NNE of Gainestown | Clarke | AL | 31.4800°N 87.6840°W | 02:20–02:22 | 0.35 mi (560 m) | 200 yd (180 m) | $145,000 |
| EF2 | A large section of the roof was removed from a wood-frame home, a single-wide mobile home was pushed off of its foundation, and the roof was lifted off of a double-wide mobile home. Another single-wide mobile home was rolled 60 yards (55 m) and disintegrated as it hit a large tree. The mobile home's mangled undercarriage was left about 600 yards (550 m) to the left of the tornado path. Several trees were downed. | | | | | | | |
| EF2 | NNE of Tyler to NW of Autaugaville | Dallas, Autauga | AL | 32.3526°N 86.8712°W | 02:25–02:40 | 13.17 mi (21.20 km) | 800 yd (730 m) | $354,000 |
| EF2 | Hundreds of trees were snapped or uprooted, and several houses were damaged. | | | | | | | |
| EF0 | NE of Titus | Elmore | AL | 32.7216°N 86.3133°W | 02:27–02:29 | 0.35 mi (560 m) | 50 yd (46 m) | $12,900 |
| EF0 | Four barns were damaged, outbuildings sustained roof damage, and a carport was damaged, along with the cars parked under it. A few tree limbs were snapped as well. | | | | | | | |
| EF1 | NE of Tyler | Autauga | AL | 32.3824°N 86.8297°W | 02:29–02:33 | 3.01 mi (4.84 km) | 800 yd (730 m) | $39,800 |
| EF1 | Hundreds of trees were snapped or uprooted. This tornado happened in close proximity to the Dallas–Autauga EF2 tornado. | | | | | | | |
| EF0 | Citronelle | Mobile | AL | 31.0960°N 88.2530°W | 03:05–03:09 | 1.24 mi (2.00 km) | 80 yd (73 m) | $30,000 |
| EF0 | Mobile homes and wood-frame homes sustained mostly minor roof damage, and an apartment complex lost a whole section of roofing. Several trees were twisted along the path. | | | | | | | |
| EF2 | W of Midway | Monroe | AL | 31.7080°N 87.1520°W | 03:26–03:31 | 3.23 mi (5.20 km) | 400 yd (370 m) | $400,000 |
| EF2 | A church and three houses were severely damaged. One home had two exterior walls collapsed, another home lost much of its roof, and the church sustained significant roof damage and the loss of its steeple. | | | | | | | |
| EF3 | W of Pine Level to W of Deatsville | Autauga | AL | 32.5803°N 86.5818°W | 03:47–04:01 | 9.29 mi (14.95 km) | 400 yd (370 m) | $1,240,000 |
| EF3 | 3 deaths – Severe damage occurred; at least 50 homes and one business were either significantly damaged or destroyed. Hundreds of trees were snapped or uprooted. A manufactured home was destroyed, resulting in the three fatalities and four serious injuries. This was the third tornado to affect the same general area along the I-65 corridor during the evening hours. | | | | | | | |
| EF2 | NW of Greenville | Butler | AL | 31.8770°N 86.7120°W | 04:15–04:20 | 3.32 mi (5.34 km) | 400 yd (370 m) | $150,000 |
| EF2 | A church and two houses were heavily damaged. A golf course and an RV park were impacted. Hundreds of trees were uprooted or snapped, including numerous pines. | | | | | | | |
| EF2 | SW of Equality to SSE of Alexander City | Elmore, Coosa, Tallapoosa | AL | 32.6937°N 86.2032°W | 04:17–04:43 | 20.75 mi (33.39 km) | 1,320 yd (1,210 m) | $1,354,100 |
| EF2 | One home sustained significant damage near Equality, several outbuildings sustained roof damage, and many trees were snapped or uprooted by a large wedge tornado. Two people were injured in Coosa County. | | | | | | | |
| EF1 | NNW of Brewton | Escambia | AL | 31.2096°N 87.2019°W | 04:38–04:53 | 10.23 mi (16.46 km) | 150 yd (140 m) | $100,000 |
| EF1 | A round top (quonset type) metal building and a small outbuilding were destroyed, a home sustained shingle damage, and numerous trees were downed. | | | | | | | |
| EF1 | NW of Jackson's Gap | Tallapoosa | AL | 32.8692°N 85.8926°W | 04:43–04:52 | 6.64 mi (10.69 km) | 200 yd (180 m) | $45,800 |
| EF1 | Many trees were downed, damaging three houses. | | | | | | | |

=== April 16 event ===
Confirmed tornadoes by Enhanced Fujita rating
| EFU | EF0 | EF1 | EF2 | EF3 | EF4 | EF5 | Total |
|---|---|---|---|---|---|---|---|
| 0 | 16 | 25 | 11 | 6 | 0 | 0 | 58 |

List of confirmed tornadoes – Saturday, April 16, 2011
| EF# | Location | County / Parish | State | Start Coord. | Time (UTC) | Path length | Max width | Damage |
|---|---|---|---|---|---|---|---|---|
| EF2 | NE of Brewton to S of Andalusia | Escambia, Conecuh, Covington | AL | 31.2030°N 86.8600°W | 05:08–05:42 | 22.95 mi (36.93 km) | 300 yd (270 m) | $4,715,000 |
| EF2 | Tornado began near Damascus and moved northeast. Several houses and mobile homes were either heavily damaged or destroyed; outbuildings and other structures were damaged as well. One mobile home was rolled onto its roof, trapping the occupants inside for several minutes; several minor injuries were reported. The Kiwanis building in Andalusia sustained roof damage. Hundreds of trees were downed along the path. | | | | | | | |
| EF1 | Fort Benning | Chattahoochee | GA | 32.3749°N 84.8532°W | 08:50–08:51 | 0.26 mi (420 m) | 50 yd (46 m) | $250,000 |
| EF1 | A quarter of the roof and a portion of an exterior wall were removed from a dormitory at Fort Benning. More than a dozen vehicles were tossed and flipped, and approximately 30 trees were downed along the path. | | | | | | | |
| EF1 | NW of Macon | Bibb | GA | 32.8628°N 83.7160°W | 10:02–10:06 | 3.46 mi (5.57 km) | 500 yd (460 m) | $2,000,000 |
| EF1 | Four houses were destroyed and about 25 others were damaged, some heavily. Two storage buildings were destroyed, a motel and a commercial building sustained roof damage, and hundreds of trees were knocked down. | | | | | | | |
| EF1 | N of Salisbury | Rowan, Davie | NC | 35.7290°N 80.5080°W | 16:41–16:46 | 4.05 mi (6.52 km) | 100 yd (91 m) | Unknown |
| EF1 | Intermittent tornado touchdown with damage to trees and houses. One mobile home lost much of its roof, a second mobile home was severely damaged when two trees fell on it, two outbuildings lost their roofs, and a carport was destroyed. Several site-built homes sustained varying degrees of roof damage, and one house was severely damaged by falling trees. Numerous trees were downed along the path. The tornado moved near U.S. Route 601 and dissipated southeast of Cooleemee in a remote area. | | | | | | | |
| EF0 | N of Monroe | Union | NC | 35.0100°N 80.5700°W | 16:59–17:03 | 2.99 mi (4.81 km) | 50 yd (46 m) | Unknown |
| EF0 | Intermittent path was embedded in a larger area of strong downburst damage. Part of the metal roof was removed from a building, several homes sustained minor structural damage, and several outbuildings were damaged, some heavily. The roof of one outbuilding was tossed about 100 yards (91 m), and the plastic roof covering of an outdoor garden center was blown away. Numerous trees were snapped or uprooted. | | | | | | | |
| EF0 | Vesuvius | Rockbridge | VA | 37.9010°N 79.2020°W | 18:03–18:04 | 1.31 mi (2.11 km) | 100 yd (91 m) | $6,000 |
| EF0 | A garage, a house, and a barn were damaged, other houses has siding removed, and several trees were snapped or uprooted, one of which fell on a metal carport. | | | | | | | |
| EF1 | NNE of Glen Raven to NE of Union Ridge | Alamance, Caswell | NC | 36.1733°N 79.4516°W | 18:06–18:19 | 10.72 mi (17.25 km) | 300 yd (270 m) | $980,000 |
| EF1 | Six homes were destroyed and around 30 more were damaged, some heavily, including loss of roofs, chimneys, and walls. A truck was destroyed by falling trees, a shed was destroyed, and 18 barns, two sheds, and a garage were damaged. The tornado began east of the Altamahaw area, west of Lake Cammack, before moving through the Union Ridge area. Many trees were downed along the path. | | | | | | | |
| EF1 | Stuarts Draft | Augusta | VA | 38.0182°N 79.0703°W | 18:20–18:23 | 3.81 mi (6.13 km) | 200 yd (180 m) | $2,200,000 |
| EF1 | 37 structures were damaged: 12 houses, 3 businesses, 5 barns, 15 sheds, and 2 mobile structures. Several of the 15 sheds/outbuildings were destroyed. Numerous trees and power lines were downed, with one tree falling on a home. | | | | | | | |
| EF2 | NNW of Roxboro, NC to Staunton River State Park | Person (NC), Halifax (VA) | NC, VA | 36.4501°N 79.0020°W | 18:40–19:10 | 26.24 mi (42.23 km) | 300 yd (270 m) | $1,100,000 |
| EF2 | Two houses and four mobile homes were destroyed, and 21 homes and another mobile home were damaged, some heavily. Two schools were damaged, one of which lost its roof, and numerous outbuildings and sheds were destroyed. Many trees were downed, including 60 to 100 acres (240,000 to 400,000 m^{2}) of trees destroyed within Staunton River State Park. Six people were injured. | | | | | | | |
| EF3 | SW of Sanford to Raleigh to NE of Rolesville | Moore, Lee, Chatham, Wake, Franklin | NC | 35.3378°N 79.3130°W | 18:53–20:15 | 66.8 mi (107.5 km) | 500 yd (460 m) | $172,075,000 |
| EF3 | 6 deaths – See section on this tornado – 103 people were injured | | | | | | | |
| EF1 | Little Rock | Dillon | SC | 34.4754°N 79.4086°W | 19:25–19:26 | 1.51 mi (2.43 km) | 440 yd (400 m) | $180,000 |
| EF1 | Numerous trees were snapped or uprooted, some falling on houses and causing significant damage. Three people were injured. | | | | | | | |
| EF0 | S of Gable to SE of Turbeville | Clarendon | SC | 33.7717°N 80.0963°W | 19:27–19:40 | 9.63 mi (15.50 km) | 40 yd (37 m) | $12,000 |
| EF0 | Intermittent tornado downed several trees. | | | | | | | |
| EF1 | NE of Chase City to NE of Victoria | Lunenburg | VA | 36.8706°N 78.3820°W | 19:30–20:00 | 16.95 mi (27.28 km) | 300 yd (270 m) | $100,000 |
| EF1 | A few homes sustained minor damage, several sheds and outbuildings were damaged, and many trees were downed. | | | | | | | |
| EF1 | Rowland | Robeson | NC | 34.5314°N 79.3002°W | 19:33–19:35 | 0.69 mi (1.11 km) | 50 yd (46 m) | $1,500,000 |
| EF1 | About 50 houses were damaged, some by fallen trees, and an elementary school sustained significant damage. A few outbuildings were destroyed, and a detached garage was pushed several feet off its foundation. Several trees were downed. | | | | | | | |
| EF3 | NE of Raeford to Dunn to Smithfield | Hoke, Cumberland, Harnett, Johnston | NC | 35.0164°N 79.1338°W | 19:33–20:45 | 58.5 mi (94.1 km) | 800 yd (730 m) | $141,100,000 |
| EF3 | 2 deaths – See section on this tornado – 176 people were injured | | | | | | | |
| EF1 | Barker Ten Mile | Robeson | NC | 34.6777°N 79.0098°W | 19:47–19:49 | 1.48 mi (2.38 km) | 352 yd (322 m) | $3,000,000 |
| EF1 | Many trees, some up to two feet in diameter, were snapped or uprooted, including along Interstate 95. Over 100 homes were damaged by falling trees, some severely. Several headstones were turned over in a cemetery, several ornamental trees, up to eight inches in diameter, were snapped, a half dozen power poles were leaned over, and a flag pole was bent down. | | | | | | | |
| EF1 | SSE of Manning | Clarendon | SC | 33.4979°N 80.2256°W | 20:13–20:21 | 8.86 mi (14.26 km) | 50 yd (46 m) | $14,000 |
| EF1 | Several trees were snapped or uprooted along and east of Lake Marion. | | | | | | | |
| EF2 | NNE of White Oak to Roseboro to WSW of Faison | Bladen, Cumberland, Sampson | NC | 34.8417°N 78.6563°W | 20:25–21:00 | 29.88 mi (48.09 km) | 800 yd (730 m) | $11,250,000 |
| EF2 | 3 deaths – See section on this tornado 13 people in total were injured. | | | | | | | |
| EF1 | NW of Dinwiddie | Dinwiddie | VA | 37.0571°N 77.6902°W | 20:37–20:47 | 7.01 mi (11.28 km) | 400 yd (370 m) | $1,500,000 |
| EF1 | Several houses and outbuildings sustained minor to moderate damage, and hundreds of trees and numerous power lines were downed. Five people were injured. | | | | | | | |
| EF1 | Pine Level to Kenly | Johnston | NC | 35.5104°N 78.2618°W | 20:50–21:00 | 8.59 mi (13.82 km) | 100 yd (91 m) | Unknown |
| EF1 | This tornado touched down as the Fayetteville EF3 tornado dissipated. It moved northeast through Micro to Kenly, crossing Interstate 95. Several houses and businesses were damaged, and trees and power lines were knocked down. | | | | | | | |
| EF2 | Bladenboro to Elizabethtown | Bladen | NC | 34.5398°N 78.7875°W | 20:58–21:18 | 13.13 mi (21.13 km) | 440 yd (400 m) | $3,100,000 |
| EF2 | 1 death – See section on this tornado. | | | | | | | |
| EF1 | St. Stephen | Berkeley | SC | 33.3548°N 80.0368°W | 21:03–21:14 | 7.92 mi (12.75 km) | 120 yd (110 m) | Unknown |
| EF1 | The tornado started as a waterspout over Lake Moultrie and tracked eastward. It destroyed a barn, lifted the roof off a church, destroyed a mobile home, shifted two other mobile homes off their foundations, tore half the roof off a house, tore shingles and siding off of a dozen homes/mobile homes, and damaged or destroyed sections of several fences. It also knocked down hundreds of trees and several power poles. | | | | | | | |
| EF0 | Faison | Duplin | NC | 35.1238°N 78.1340°W | 21:12–21:14 | 0.21 mi (340 m) | 30 yd (27 m) | $0 |
| EF0 | Brief tornado downed a few trees. | | | | | | | |
| EF2 | NW of Lucama to Wilson | Wilson | NC | 35.6580°N 78.0410°W | 21:12–21:20 | 8.97 mi (14.44 km) | 200 yd (180 m) | $3,000,000 |
| EF2 | Over 175 houses were impacted/damaged, 40 of which were destroyed, and trees were snapped as the storm tracked northeast into Wilson. Numerous businesses were also damaged, including a car dealership which was nearly destroyed (dozens of vehicles were heavily damaged or destroyed). Several air conditioning units were blown off the top of several businesses. A family medical supply building and an apartment building both received minor roof and window damage. Ten people were injured. | | | | | | | |
| EF2 | Roanoke Rapids | Halifax, Northampton | NC | 36.4152°N 77.7031°W | 21:20–21:28 | 6.41 mi (10.32 km) | 300 yd (270 m) | $1,220,000 |
| EF2 | This tornado was produced by the supercell which produced the Sanford–Raleigh EF3 tornado. Over 90 structures were damaged, mainly houses and businesses, about 15 of which were destroyed. An industrial building and a Sonic Drive-In restaurant were heavily damaged. Numerous trees were downed as well. | | | | | | | |
| EF0 | E of Goldsboro | Wayne | NC | 35.3636°N 77.8427°W | 21:32–21:35 | 2.76 mi (4.44 km) | 400 yd (370 m) | $5,000 |
| EF0 | Several homes sustained minor siding and shingle damage, a farm building was heavily damaged, and several trees were downed before the tornado dissipated near the Greene County line. A second tornado developed just to the south in Lenoir County, before moving into Greene County and intensifying to EF3. | | | | | | | |
| EF0 | SW of Clarkton | Columbus | NC | 34.4216°N 78.7303°W | 21:33–21:34 | 0.22 mi (350 m) | 25 yd (23 m) | $0 |
| EF0 | Brief tornado spotted by storm chasers in an open field with no damage. | | | | | | | |
| EF3 | E of Goldsboro to SW of Farmville | Lenoir, Greene | NC | 35.3441°N 77.8233°W | 21:35–21:54 | 17.66 mi (28.42 km) | 400 yd (370 m) | $30,004,000 |
| EF3 | This tornado began near the Wayne–Lenoir county line and moved northeast through the Snow Hill area, intensifying to high-end EF3. Between 40 and 50 houses were destroyed, a few of which were nearly flattened, along with several businesses. Greene County Middle School sustained severe damage and the gym at the high school was destroyed. Numerous vehicles, sheds, and outbuildings were destroyed, large metal power poles were bent over or pulled out of the ground, and many trees were downed. 30 people were injured, a few seriously. | | | | | | | |
| EF0 | SW of Andrews | Georgetown | SC | 33.3577°N 79.6514°W | 21:41–21:42 | 0.17 mi (270 m) | 30 yd (27 m) | $28,000 |
| EF0 | A house sustained minor siding and flashing damage, and about a dozen trees were snapped or uprooted. | | | | | | | |
| EF0 | SSE of Andrews | Georgetown | SC | 33.3915°N 79.5410°W | 21:45–21:47 | 0.63 mi (1.01 km) | 30 yd (27 m) | $40,000 |
| EF0 | The tornado caused damage to the roof of a double-wide and damaged the skirting and a swing set of a second. It also tossed two aluminum boats across the yard and downed about 20 trees. | | | | | | | |
| EF1 | S of Drewryville | Southampton | VA | 36.6938°N 77.3024°W | 21:50–21:53 | 1.86 mi (2.99 km) | 300 yd (270 m) | $30,000 |
| EF1 | A house sustained roof damage, a shed was heavily damaged, and several trees were downed. | | | | | | | |
| EF1 | ESE of Andrews | Georgetown | SC | 33.4164°N 79.4516°W | 21:53–21:55 | 0.45 mi (720 m) | 60 yd (55 m) | $100,000 |
| EF1 | Brief tornado snapped about 400 trees, dozens of which blocked a road. | | | | | | | |
| EF1 | E of Andrews | Georgetown | SC | 33.4631°N 79.3701°W | 21:59–22:01 | 0.5 mi (0.80 km) | 60 yd (55 m) | $60,000 |
| EF1 | Two sheds were heavily damaged (one was rolled and the other lost its roof) and a pickup truck was rolled. About 50 trees were snapped or uprooted as well. | | | | | | | |
| EF1 | Farmville | Pitt | NC | 35.5820°N 77.5974°W | 21:59–22:04 | 3.29 mi (5.29 km) | 75 yd (69 m) | $1,000,000 |
| EF1 | Numerous houses sustained significant damage, including loss of roofs. Trees and power lines were downed as well. Five people sustained minor injuries. Initially considered an extension of the Snow Hill EF3 tornado, it was later confirmed as a separate tornado. | | | | | | | |
| EF1 | SSW of Whiteville | Columbus | NC | 34.1989°N 78.7435°W | 22:05–22:07 | 1.1 mi (1.8 km) | 50 yd (46 m) | $35,000 |
| EF1 | Four houses were damaged, two by falling trees, and many trees were snapped or uprooted. | | | | | | | |
| EF0 | SSW of Wakefield | Southampton | VA | 36.8863°N 77.0256°W | 22:20–22:25 | 1.75 mi (2.82 km) | 50 yd (46 m) | $2,000 |
| EF0 | Several trees were downed, and a fence was damaged. | | | | | | | |
| EF1 | NW of Urbanna | Middlesex | VA | 37.6743°N 76.6037°W | 22:30–22:35 | 1.06 mi (1.71 km) | 400 yd (370 m) | $100,000 |
| EF1 | A house and a grain silo were heavily damaged and numerous trees were downed by a multiple-vortex tornado. | | | | | | | |
| EF0 | SSE of Kenansville | Duplin | NC | 34.9171°N 77.9365°W | 22:35–22:39 | 0.64 mi (1,030 m) | 150 yd (140 m) | $0 |
| EF0 | A few trees were downed. | | | | | | | |
| EF3 | E of Surry to Clopton to W of Foster | Surry, James City, York, Gloucester, Mathews | VA | 37.1532°N 76.7040°W | 22:45–23:20 | 26.47 mi (42.60 km) | 800 yd (730 m) | $8,020,000 |
| EF3 | 2 deaths – The tornado began near the Surry Nuclear Power Plant, downing trees and causing damage to buildings and vehicles at the plant. It crossed the James River, damaging a few homes and outbuildings and knocking down more trees as it moved through James City and York counties (mainly affecting Naval Weapons Station Yorktown). After crossing the York River, it entered the Clopton area just south of Gloucester, where 15 homes were destroyed, 29 sustained major damage, and over more 100 houses and other structures were affected. A middle school was destroyed, several school buses were overturned, and numerous trees and power lines were downed. The two fatalities occurred in a mobile home, and at least 24 other people were injured. | | | | | | | |
| EF3 | Askewville to ESE of Harrellsville | Bertie, Hertford | NC | 36.0870°N 76.9502°W | 22:55–23:10 | 17.88 mi (28.78 km) | 1,300 yd (1,200 m) | $4,450,000 |
| EF3 | 12 deaths – See section on this tornado – 58 people were injured | | | | | | | |
| EF2 | NW of Colerain to S of Sunbury | Bertie, Hertford, Gates | NC | 36.2102°N 76.7827°W | 23:05–23:25 | 17.51 mi (28.18 km) | 500 yd (460 m) | $1,880,000 |
| EF2 | This tornado tracked parallel to and simultaneously with the Askewville EF3 tornado. Numerous homes and other buildings were damaged, including poultry houses. Pieces of farm equipment were also damaged, a mobile home has its roof blown off, and many trees were downed. Eight people were injured. | | | | | | | |
| EF2 | Hargetts Crossroads | Jones | NC | 34.9960°N 77.6400°W | 23:07–23:13 | 2.41 mi (3.88 km) | 200 yd (180 m) | $100,000 |
| EF2 | The tornado primarily remained in rural countryside, but one house was severely damaged. | | | | | | | |
| EF0 | NE of Robersonville | Martin | NC | 35.8893°N 77.1744°W | 23:09–23:11 | 0.11 mi (180 m) | 75 yd (69 m) | $10,000 |
| EF0 | Brief tornado tore the roof off a double-wide mobile home, tossing it around 20 yards (18 m). | | | | | | | |
| EF2 | SW of Windsor to N of Smithfield | Isle of Wight | VA | 36.7529°N 76.8396°W | 23:10–23:40 | 22.61 mi (36.39 km) | 400 yd (370 m) | $300,000 |
| EF2 | About 25 houses were damaged, some heavily, and farm equipment was thrown around and damaged. Many trees and several power lines were downed along the path. | | | | | | | |
| EF0 | Leesburg | Loudoun | VA | 39.0979°N 77.6376°W | 23:12–23:16 | 4.08 mi (6.57 km) | 50 yd (46 m) | $4,000 |
| EF0 | Shingles were removed from a house, a road sign was pulled from the ground, and trees were snapped or uprooted. | | | | | | | |
| EF2 | Deltaville | Middlesex | VA | 37.5331°N 76.3528°W | 23:25–23:35 | 2.8 mi (4.5 km) | 400 yd (370 m) | $6,000,000 |
| EF2 | The tornado formed over the Piankatank River and moved through Deltaville. Thirty-five homes were either destroyed or sustained major damage, and 25 more homes sustained minor damage. Numerous trees were downed. The tornado dissipated after moving over the mouth of the Rappahannock River. | | | | | | | |
| EF1 | WNW of Mt. Airy | Frederick | MD | 39.4050°N 77.2613°W | 23:37–23:38 | 1.17 mi (1.88 km) | 50 yd (46 m) | $50,000 |
| EF1 | A detached garage was collapsed, several barns were damaged or destroyed, and shingles and siding were removed from a house. Numerous trees were snapped or uprooted. | | | | | | | |
| EF1 | NW of Mt. Airy | Frederick | MD | 39.4144°N 77.2398°W | 23:38–23:46 | 4.36 mi (7.02 km) | 50 yd (46 m) | $50,000 |
| EF1 | This tornado formed as the previous tornado dissipated nearby. Roofing panels were removed from a detached garage, a few trees were snapped, and pieces of large tree limbs and plywood were impaled in adjacent roofs. | | | | | | | |
| EF0 | NNW of Vanceboro | Craven | NC | 35.3396°N 77.1788°W | 23:40–23:42 | 0.14 mi (230 m) | 30 yd (27 m) | Unknown |
| EF0 | Brief tornado bent and twisted a metal sign. | | | | | | | |
| EF1 | ESE of Unionville | Frederick, Carroll | MD | 39.4358°N 77.1476°W | 23:47–23:51 | 3.5 mi (5.6 km) | 50 yd (46 m) | $30,000 |
| EF1 | Siding was removed from a house, a power pole was snapped, and several trees were snapped or uprooted. | | | | | | | |
| EF0 | NW of Manchester | Carroll | MD | 39.6483°N 77.0785°W | 23:51–00:05 | 1.95 mi (3.14 km) | 75 yd (69 m) | $20,000 |
| EF0 | Two barns sustained roof damage near Deep Run, and numerous trees were snapped or uprooted, one of which fell on a house. | | | | | | | |
| EF0 | Bath | Beaufort | NC | 35.4700°N 76.8100°W | 00:08–00:11 | 0.6 mi (970 m) | 30 yd (27 m) | $4,000 |
| EF0 | Several houses sustained minor roof damage and a few trees and tree limbs were downed as a waterspout came ashore. | | | | | | | |
| EF3 | Jacksonville | Onslow | NC | 34.7335°N 77.3765°W | 00:11–00:20 | 3.76 mi (6.05 km) | 450 yd (410 m) | $9,400,000 |
| EF3 | This tornado touched down on Camp Lejeune and moved to the east side of Jacksonville. WNCT coverage reported that severe damage occurred in the area. At least 30 houses in the Tarawa Terrace area were damaged, five of which were completely destroyed. Dozens of other houses were damaged or destroyed further to the northeast. Several vehicles were picked up and thrown. At least 30 people were injured. | | | | | | | |
| EF0 | W of York | York | PA | 39.9677°N 76.7795°W | 00:20–00:21 | 0.49 mi (790 m) | 200 yd (180 m) | $20,000 |
| EF0 | Brief tornado removed a canopy from a gas station, damaged another business and snapped a few trees. Brief tornado in a populated area caused mostly minor damage to power lines, several outbuildings, and several homes. A canopy was removed from a gas station, two billboards were damaged, and a significant portion of a roof was removed off a business and blown across a road. A large 40x40 foot skylight was lifted and blown across the roof of the West Manchester Mall. Numerous trees were downed along the path. Two people were injured. | | | | | | | |
| EF2 | SW of Arapahoe | Craven, Pamlico | NC | 34.9500°N 77.0100°W | 00:43–00:54 | 4.19 mi (6.74 km) | 200 yd (180 m) | $4,000,000 |
| EF2 | Numerous houses were severely damaged or destroyed in the Riverdale area, including loss of roofs or parts of second stories, and several others sustained minor damage. Numerous trees were downed. The tornado crossed the Neuse River and rapidly dissipated in Pamlico County, dropping debris from Riverdale, including a large sign. Seven people were injured. | | | | | | | |
| EF1 | SSE of Columbia to Alligator | Tyrrell | NC | 35.8500°N 76.2100°W | 01:01–01:12 | 7.42 mi (11.94 km) | 550 yd (500 m) | $400,000 |
| EF1 | A church lost most of its roof and had a wall collapsed, a mobile home was heavily damaged, and several trees were downed. | | | | | | | |
| EF1 | Harbinger | Currituck | NC | 36.0968°N 75.8325°W | 01:30–01:35 | 2.02 mi (3.25 km) | 200 yd (180 m) | $40,000 |
| EF1 | A tornado began as a waterspout on Albemarle Sound and moved inland, crossing U.S. Route 158 into Currituck Sound. A few houses and businesses were damaged, and vehicles and boats were thrown. Numerous trees were downed as well. | | | | | | | |
| EF1 | Duck | Dare | NC | 36.1590°N 75.7524°W | 01:35–01:37 | 0.67 mi (1.08 km) | 250 yd (230 m) | $767,000 |
| EF1 | About 75 houses and businesses were damaged in the community, a few of which were heavily damaged primarily due to fallen trees, before the tornado entered the Atlantic Ocean. | | | | | | | |

== See also ==
- Enhanced Fujita scale
- List of United States tornadoes in April 2011
- List of tornadoes in the 2011 Super Outbreak
