= Hurricane Edith (1971) =

Category 4 Atlantic hurricane

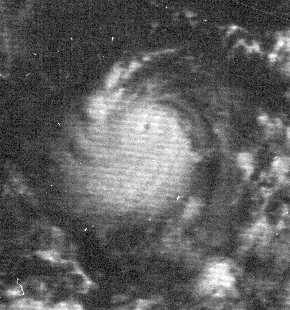
- Satellite image of Edith on September 9, 1971

Meteorological history
- Formed: September 5, 1971
- Dissipated: September 18, 1971

Category 4 major hurricane
- 1-minute sustained (SSHWS/NWS)
- Highest winds: 150 mph (240 km/h)
- Lowest pressure: 943 mbar (hPa); 27.85 inHg

Overall effects
- Fatalities: 37 direct
- Damage: $25.4 million (1971 USD)
- Areas affected: Lesser Antilles, Northern Venezuela, Nicaragua, Honduras, Belize, Yucatán, Northeastern Mexico, Texas, Louisiana, Mississippi, Alabama, Florida, Georgia, Tennessee, North Carolina
- IBTrACS
- Part of the 1971 Atlantic hurricane season

Hurricane Edith was the strongest hurricane to form during the 1971 season, becoming a Category 4 hurricane on the Saffir-Simpson scale. Edith developed from a tropical wave on September 5 and quickly strengthened into a hurricane in the Caribbean Sea. Edith rapidly intensified on September 9 as it approached Central America, and it made landfall on Cape Gracias a Dios as a Category 4 hurricane, with sustained winds of 150 mph (240 km/h). It quickly lost strength over Central America, and after briefly entering the Gulf of Honduras, Edith struck Belize as a strong storm. (Note: At the time and until 1973, known as British Honduras) It crossed the Yucatán Peninsula and moved across the Gulf of Mexico, approaching but remaining just offshore Tamaulipas. A trough turned the storm to the northeast, and Edith restrengthened into a hurricane, making its final landfall on Louisiana with winds of 90 mph (145 km/h) on September 16. Edith steadily weakened over land and dissipated over Georgia on September 18.

The hurricane killed two people when it passed near Aruba. Striking northeastern Central America as a Category 4 hurricane, Edith destroyed hundreds of homes and killed at least 35 people. In Texas, high tides caused coastal flooding but little damage. Edith caused moderate to heavy damage in portions of Louisiana due to flooding and a tornado outbreak from the storm. One tornado, rated F3 on the Fujita Scale, damaged several homes and injured multiple people in Baton Rouge. The tornado outbreak extended eastward into Florida, of which a few destroyed entire buildings. Damage in the United States totaled $25 million (1971 USD). (Note: All currency totals are in United States dollars (USD) and unadjusted for inflation.)

== Meteorological history ==
Map plotting the storm's track and intensity, according to the Saffir–Simpson scale Map key Saffir–Simpson scale Tropical depression (≤38 mph, ≤62 km/h) Tropical storm (39–73 mph, 63–118 km/h) Category 1 (74–95 mph, 119–153 km/h) Category 2 (96–110 mph, 154–177 km/h) Category 3 (111–129 mph, 178–208 km/h) Category 4 (130–156 mph, 209–251 km/h) Category 5 (≥157 mph, ≥252 km/h) Unknown Storm type Tropical cyclone Subtropical cyclone Extratropical cyclone, remnant low, tropical disturbance, or monsoon depression

A tropical wave moved off the coast of Africa near Dakar on August 31. It moved westward into the Intertropical Convergence Zone, and organized into a tropical disturbance on September 2 with a small, circular area of convection. The system moved to the west, and on September 3, the convection diminished after moving west of 40° W. By the next day, the tropical disturbance was barely discernible from the clouds of the Intertropical Convergence Zone. The wave gradually became detached from the ITCZ, and based on a reconnaissance flight that confirmed the existence of a low-level circulation, it is estimated the system developed into a tropical depression on September 5 while located 255 miles (410 km) east of Grenada.

The depression moved quickly westward, passing through the southern Lesser Antilles early on September 6. The southern portion of the circulation passed over northeastern Venezuela, though after entering the Caribbean Sea, another reconnaissance flight was unable to confirm the existence of a low-level circulation. Shortly thereafter, while moving into an area of light wind shear, it was able to organize and strengthen further, and on September 7, the depression strengthened into Tropical Storm Edith near the island of Curaçao. While initially, a cold-core upper-level low persisted about 750 miles (1,210 km) northwest of the storm, Edith moved west-northwestward due to the influence of a narrow and persistent ridge of high pressure, which extended from the southwestern Atlantic Ocean to the Gulf of Mexico. As the storm continued into open waters of the Caribbean, the upper-level low gradually weakened and was replaced with an anticyclone. This allowed the storm to strengthen further, and on September 8, Edith became a hurricane in the south-central Caribbean Sea.

On September 9, the storm rapidly intensified, and within 24 hours, Edith strengthened from a minimal hurricane to a powerful 150 mph (240 km/h) Category 4 hurricane just off the coast of Nicaragua. The cause for the explosive deepening is unknown, though it is speculated that the transformation in the upper troposphere from an upper-level low to an anticyclone led to a release of baroclinic energy. Reconnaissance aircraft crews in the peak of the storm reported extreme turbulence, causing concern for the safety of the crews. At its peak intensity, the very well-defined "pinhole" eye was only 5 miles (8.0 km) in diameter. Late on September 9, Hurricane Edith made landfall on northeastern Nicaragua at Cabo Gracias a Dios.

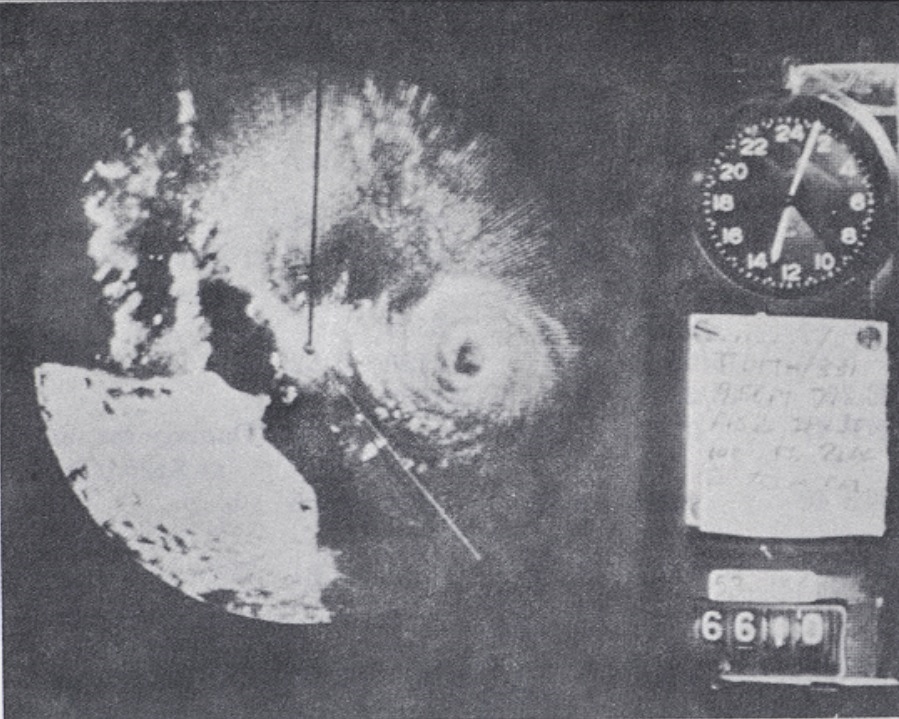
Radar image of Edith at peak intensity

Hurricane Edith rapidly weakened over the mountainous terrain of northeastern Central America, and 18 hours after it made landfall, it emerged into the Gulf of Honduras as a minimal hurricane. It continued to weaken as it moved northwestward, and made landfall near Belize City with winds of 70 mph (110 km/h). Edith weakened further while crossing the Yucatán Peninsula, and emerged into the Gulf of Mexico near Campeche, Mexico late on September 11 as a minimal tropical storm. Edith initially failed to re-intensify as it moved northwestward, despite low amounts of wind shear and warm waters. This was because an anticyclone over the Gulf was closely connected with Hurricane Fern, which developed and moved over the northwestern portion of the Gulf of Mexico. The anticyclone resulted in an easterly upper-level flow across Edith, creating conditions not conducive for intensification. As Fern moved inland over Texas, the flow became more favorable around Edith, and 36 hours after entering the Gulf of Mexico, the storm began to reintensify slightly.

Edith continued moving to the west-northwest, heading towards the coast of Mexico, but early on September 14, the storm stalled while located just off the coast of Tamaulipas. A mid-latitude trough of low pressure approached the storm, and caused Edith to turn to slowly drift towards the northeast. Located only miles from the Mexican coast, Edith again failed to strengthen until September 15, when it accelerated northeastward and regained hurricane status. The hurricane turned to the east-northeast as it approached the coast of Louisiana, and made landfall on September 16 in a sparsely populated area 30 miles (48 km) east of Cameron with winds of 90 mph (140 km/h), a Category 1 hurricane. Edith rapidly weakened over land, degenerating into a tropical storm over Louisiana, and into a tropical depression over Mississippi. It continued to the east-northeast, and dissipated over northwestern Georgia on September 18.

== Preparations ==
Fourteen hours prior to Edith making landfall in Central America, the National Hurricane Center warned citizens about the extreme danger of the approaching hurricane, and asked them to prepare for hurricane conditions. In Belize, officials ordered the mandatory evacuation of low-lying areas, resulting in hundreds of residents leaving to the United States through the international airport. Officials sent police troops to maintain order and prevent looting.

While the storm was located in the Gulf of Mexico, the National Hurricane Center issued a Hurricane Warning from Cameron to Morgan City, Louisiana eighteen hours before the hurricane made landfall. Edith later struck land in the middle portion of the warning area. Several oil facilities in the gulf were closed or placed on automatic controls. Drilling rigs as far east as the coastal waters off of Mississippi were prepared to evacuate in the event Edith moved further east than anticipated. Additionally, thousands evacuated coastal areas of Louisiana prior to the arrival of the hurricane. Several shelters opened in coastal cities, and many people prepared for the hurricane by purchasing emergency supplies. Officials closed schools throughout much of southern Louisiana.

== Impact ==
=== Caribbean and Mexico ===
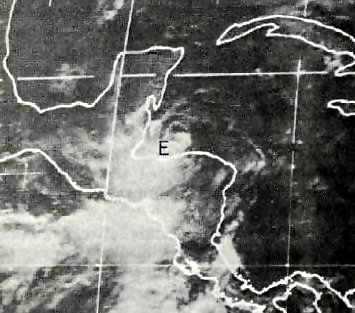
Edith entering the Gulf of Honduras

While passing through the southern Lesser Antilles, the tropical depression produced heavy rainfall and winds of around 35 mph (56 km/h). Edith produced tropical storm force winds in Aruba, and gusts reached 60 mph (97 km/h). Two fishermen were reported lost at sea and presumed dead as a result of Edith.

Edith produced strong winds across northeastern Nicaragua and eastern Honduras, with Puerto Lempira reporting an unofficial sustained wind of 140 mph (230 km/h). Press reports indicated every house in the Cape Gracias area was destroyed or heavily damaged, leaving 7,000 people homeless. The meteorological service in British Honduras stated there were 100 fatalities near Cape Gracias, though a later report indicated 35 people died in Nicaragua. There, damage was estimated at over $380,000. Three United States Air Force aircraft delivered food, medical supplies, and fuel to the hurricane victims of Nicaragua. In Honduras, the hurricane produced 15 feet (4.6 m) tides and strong winds, while strong waves destroyed 40 fishing boats as well. The hurricane reportedly destroyed entire villages in the country.

Offshore islands in Belize reported winds of up to 60 mph (97 km/h). Edith produced flooding in a few towns in the southern portion of the country, with some buildings damaged. Heavy damage was reported near Monkey River Town.

After moving into the Gulf of Mexico, Edith produced above normal tides along Mexico's gulf coast, reaching 0.92 ft (28 cm) in Tuxpan, Veracruz. The storm also dropped rainfall in parts of the country.

=== United States ===
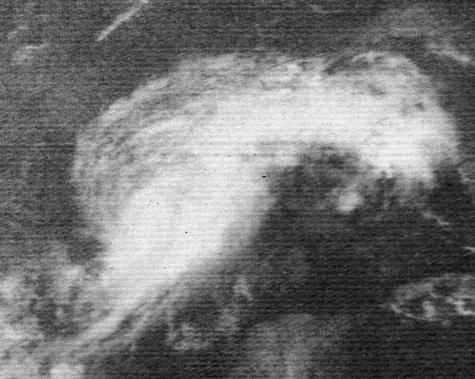
Edith approaching Texas on September 15

Throughout the United States, Hurricane Edith left about $25 million in damage. Most of the damage total was related to agriculture in southwest Louisiana. However, Edith also produced a damaging outbreak of 16 tornadoes across Louisiana, Mississippi, Alabama, and Florida. Most of these tornadoes formed along a strong rainband ahead of the storm, combined with the intrusion of dry air into the hurricane's circulation. In Louisiana, there were seven tornadoes. The first, rated F1 on the Fujita scale, touched down northeast of Loreauville in Iberia Parish and crossed into neighboring St. Martin Parish. The twister destroyed a farm and damaged several mobile homes, injuring six people. An F3 tornado struck eastern Baton Rouge and intermittently remained on the ground for 7.3 mi (11.7 km). The tornado damaged hundreds of homes, including 15 that were destroyed, while also damaging a shopping center, a church, and a high school. Damage was estimated at $2.5 million, and three people were injured. An F1 touched down briefly in rural Iberville Parish, which knocked down a few trees. An F2 tornado briefly hit the city of Franklin, damaging several homes. A brief F0 tornado touched down near Venice. An F2 tornado in Amite City damaged a restaurant and a power pole. An F1 tornado touched down near Robert in Tangipahoa Parish, destroying three homes and a barn. In neighboring Mississippi, a brief tornado downed trees and power lines in Attala County. In Walthall County, a tornado destroyed the roof of a home, and in Harrison County, another tornado destroyed the roof of a twister. There were five tornadoes in Alabama related to Edith, including two each in Washington and Baldwin counties. An F2 twister near Yarbo damaged several homes and knocked down trees. An F1 tornado hit Tibbie, destroying a few small buildings. Near Perdido, an F1 tornado destroyed two mobile homes and a few barns, while also damaging another ten homes. An F2 tornado struck Fairhope and destroyed two homes. At Danleys Crossroads, an F3 tornado destroyed a home and a vehicle. There was also a tornado that touched down near Pensacola, Florida, destroying the roof of a house and flipping a mobile home, causing one injury.

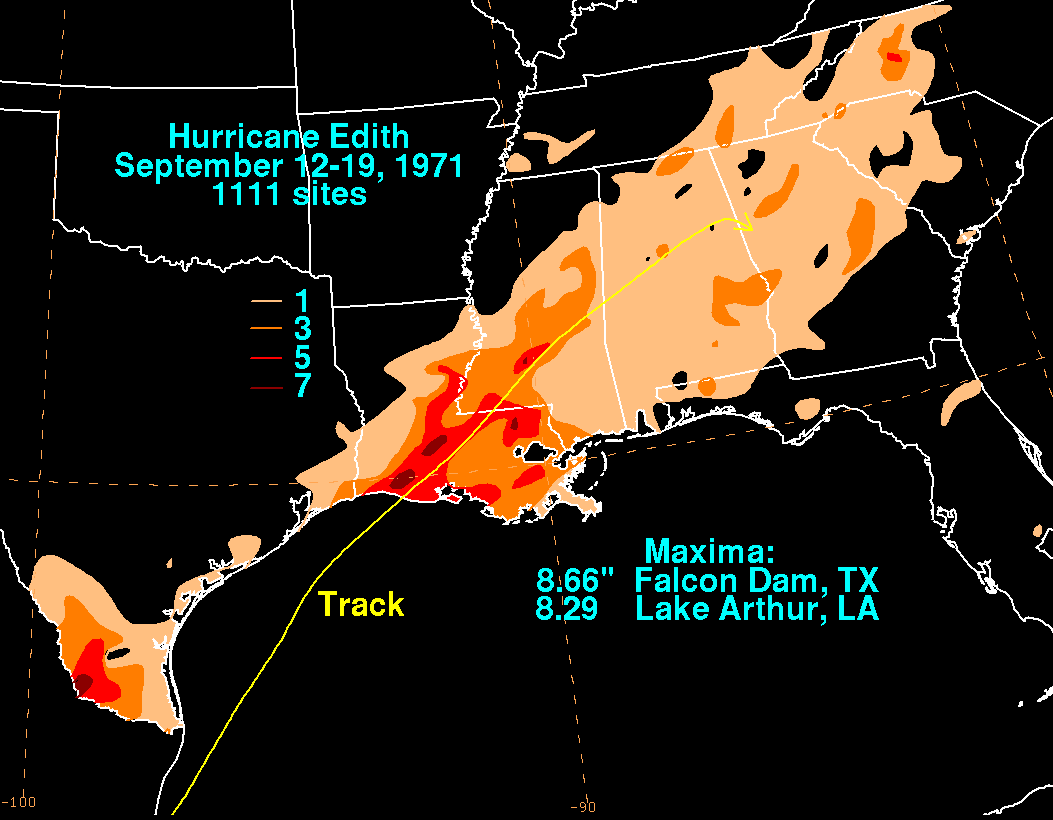
Rainfall from Edith across the United States

Hurricane Edith affected Texas a few days after Hurricane Fern affected much of the state. The highest precipitation related to Edith in Texas was 8.66 in (220 mm), recorded at Falcon Dam, while wind gusts reached 53 mph (85 km/h) in Galveston. While moving past the state, Edith produced above normal tides, with a 6 feet (1.8 m) storm surge covering portions of Highway 87 between High Island and Sabine Pass. The hurricane produced hailstorms across Swisher, Hale, and Lynn counties, causing $12.4 million in crop damage. In Lynn County, hailstones reached 3 in (76 mm) in diameter, becoming the worst hailstorm in the county's history. About 55,000 acres (220 km^{2}) of cotton fields were damaged, along with another 5,000 acres (20 km^{2}) of sorghum. The passage of Hurricane Edith also resulted in downed trees and power lines. Near Port Arthur, flying debris and broken glass injured three people, while downed power lines sparked several house fires.

Off the coast of Louisiana, the hurricane wrecked three boats, but all the occupants were safely rescued. While making landfall in Louisiana, Edith produced wind gusts of 96 mph (154 km/h) at Cameron, along with sustained winds of 69 mph (111 km/h). Edith also produced high tides in the state, with waters reaching 9.7 feet (3.0 m) above normal at Cypremort Point. The high tides sank a few boats, and left behind a layer of mud and silt along coastal and marshy areas. Rainfall in the state reached 8.29 in (211 mm) at Lake Arthur. Flooding occurred throughout southern Louisiana, in some cases due to both rainfall and the storm surge. The hurricane caused extensive crop damage southwestern Louisiana, mostly to sugar cane, cotton, and sorghum. Elsewhere in the state, the hurricane knocked down or damaged trees, power lines, and billboards. In Mississippi, wind gusts peaked at 70 mph (110 km/h) in Hattiesburg. The winds caused power outages and broken windows, injuring one person due to broken glass. Rainfall in the state peaked at 7.05 inches (179 mm) in Rockport. The rains caused flash flooding, which closed roads and damaged bridges. The hurricane also damaged crops in the state, although to a less extent than Louisiana. In Alabama, the storm produced light rains and winds, while tides reached 2.7 feet (0.82 m) above normal in Mobile. In Florida, Edith produced slightly above-normal tides and light rain. In Georgia, heavy rainfall caused flooding along streams in the northern portion of the state, closing a few roads. Rainfall from Edith extended across the southeastern United States, reaching 6.17 in (157 mm) along the Catawba River in North Carolina.

About a month after Edith struck the United States, President Richard Nixon declared portions of Louisiana as a disaster area, which allocated relief funds to aid the affected citizens.

== See also ==
- Other storms of the same name
- List of Category 4 Atlantic hurricanes
- List of Honduras hurricanes
- List of Louisiana hurricanes
