= Yarbo =

Yarbo may refer to:

- Yarbo, Alabama, United States
- Yarbo, Saskatchewan, Canada

== See also ==
- Hank Yarbo, a fictional character in the Canadian television sitcom Corner Gas
