= Frankville, Alabama =

- Unincorporated community
- Location within Alabama Location within the United States
- Coordinates: 31°38′48″N 88°08′51″W
- Country: United States
- State: Alabama
- County: Washington
- Elevation: 151 ft (46 m)
- Time zone: UTC-6 (Central (CST))
  - Summer (DST): UTC-5 (CDT)
- ZIP code: 36538
- Area code: 251
- GNIS feature ID: 157957

Frankville is an unincorporated community in Washington County, Alabama, United States, located on County Route 31, 9.8 miles (15.8 km) east of Millry. Frankville has a post office with ZIP code 36538.

Since 1926 it is the home to the annual Frankville Old Time Fiddlers Convention, held in the former local school building.
