= Tescott, Kansas =

City in Ottawa County, Kansas

- City
- Location within Ottawa County and Kansas

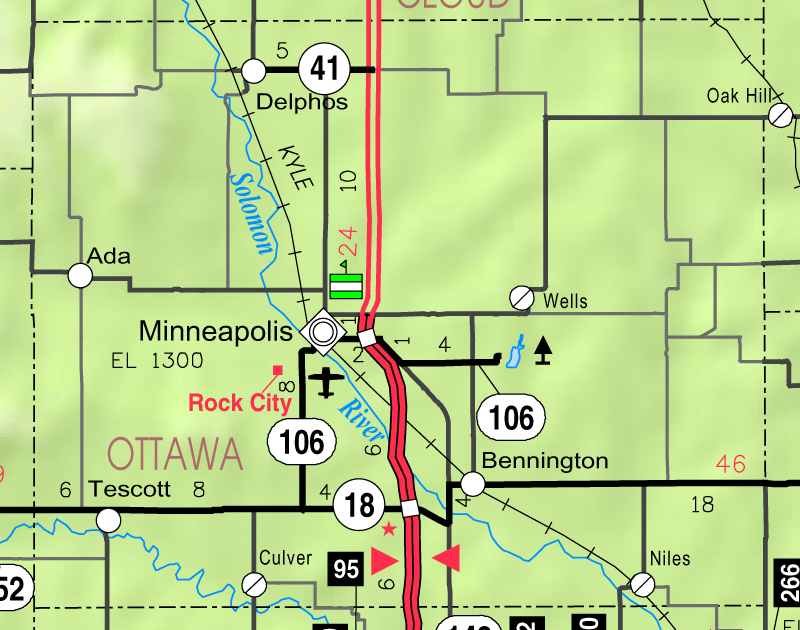
- KDOT map of Ottawa County (legend)
- Coordinates: 39°0′43″N 97°52′41″W
- Country: United States
- State: Kansas
- County: Ottawa
- Founded: 1860s
- Platted: 1866
- Incorporated: 1905
- Named for: T.E. Scott

Area
  - Total: 0.39 sq mi (1.00 km^{2})
  - Land: 0.39 sq mi (1.00 km^{2})
  - Water: 0 sq mi (0.00 km^{2})
- Elevation: 1,293 ft (394 m)

Population (2020)
  - Total: 265
  - Density: 686/sq mi (265/km^{2})
- Time zone: UTC-6 (CST)
  - Summer (DST): UTC-5 (CDT)
- ZIP Code: 67484
- Area code: 785
- FIPS code: 20-70250
- GNIS ID: 2396044
- Website: cityoftescott.com

Tescott is a city in Ottawa County, Kansas, United States. As of the 2020 census, the population of the city was 265. It is located northwest of Salina at the intersection of 30th Road and K-18 highway, next to an abandoned railroad.

== History ==
Tescott was laid out in 1866. The city was named for T. E. Scott, an early settler.

On May 1, 2018, an EF3 wedge tornado struck the area near the city, damaging one house. Nobody was killed or injured.

== Geography ==
According to the United States Census Bureau, the city has a total area of 0.36 square miles (0.93 km^{2}), all land.

=== Climate ===
The climate in this area is characterized by hot, humid summers and generally mild to cool winters. According to the Köppen Climate Classification system, Tescott has a humid subtropical climate, abbreviated "Cfa" on climate maps.

== Demographics ==
Historical population
Census	Pop.	Note	%±
1910	421		—
1920	377		−10.5%
1930	382		1.3%
1940	402		5.2%
1950	412		2.5%
1960	396		−3.9%
1970	393		−0.8%
1980	331		−15.8%
1990	317		−4.2%
2000	339		6.9%
2010	319		−5.9%
2020	265		−16.9%
U.S. Decennial Census

Tescott is part of the Salina Micropolitan Statistical Area.

=== 2010 census ===
As of the census of 2010, there were 319 people, 129 households, and 86 families residing in the city. The population density was 886.1 inhabitants per square mile (342.1/km^{2}). There were 155 housing units at an average density of 430.6 per square mile (166.3/km^{2}). The racial makeup of the city was 96.9% White, 0.3% Native American, 1.6% from other races, and 1.3% from two or more races. Hispanic or Latino of any race were 1.6% of the population.

There were 129 households, of which 33.3% had children under the age of 18 living with them, 50.4% were married couples living together, 9.3% had a female householder with no husband present, 7.0% had a male householder with no wife present, and 33.3% were non-families. 29.5% of all households were made up of individuals, and 13.2% had someone living alone who was 65 years of age or older. The average household size was 2.47 and the average family size was 3.03.

The median age in the city was 40.4 years. 30.7% of residents were under the age of 18; 3.6% were between the ages of 18 and 24; 22% were from 25 to 44; 30.4% were from 45 to 64; and 13.5% were 65 years of age or older. The gender makeup of the city was 50.5% male and 49.5% female.

=== 2000 census ===
As of the census of 2000, there were 339 people, 133 households, and 88 families residing in the city. The population density was 998.5 inhabitants per square mile (385.5/km^{2}). There were 151 housing units at an average density of 444.8 per square mile (171.7/km^{2}). The racial makeup of the city was 97.35% White, 0.88% African American, 1.47% Native American, and 0.29% from two or more races.

There were 133 households, out of which 36.1% had children under the age of 18 living with them, 54.1% were married couples living together, 10.5% had a female householder with no husband present, and 33.1% were non-families. 30.1% of all households were made up of individuals, and 15.8% had someone living alone who was 65 years of age or older. The average household size was 2.55 and the average family size was 3.18.

In the city, the population was spread out, with 32.2% under the age of 18, 5.6% from 18 to 24, 29.2% from 25 to 44, 19.2% from 45 to 64, and 13.9% who were 65 years of age or older. The median age was 35 years. For every 100 females, there were 100.6 males. For every 100 females age 18 and over, there were 94.9 males.

As of 2000 the median income for a household in the city was $37,813, and the median income for a family was $44,375. Males had a median income of $31,250 versus $15,938 for females. The per capita income for the city was $16,839. About 11.0% of families and 17.8% of the population were below the poverty line, including 26.2% of those under age 18 and 13.1% of those age 65 or over.

== Education ==
The community is served by Twin Valley USD 240 public school district. The district has two high schools; Bennington High School and Tescott High School.

The Tescott Trojans won the Kansas State High School boys class BB basketball championship in 1957.

== See also ==
- List of Grand Army of the Republic posts in Kansas
- List of tornadoes in the tornado outbreak of April 14–16, 2011
