= Sunflower, Alabama =

- Unincorporated community
- Location within Alabama Location within the United States
- Coordinates: 31°22′57″N 88°00′30″W
- Country: United States
- State: Alabama
- County: Washington
- Elevation: 23 ft (7.0 m)
- Time zone: UTC-6 (Central (CST))
  - Summer (DST): UTC-5 (CDT)
- ZIP code: 36581
- Area code: 251
- GNIS feature ID: 153611

Sunflower is an unincorporated community in Washington County, Alabama, United States, located 8.1 miles (13.0 km) north of McIntosh. Sunflower has a post office with ZIP code 36581.
