= Malcolm, Alabama =

- Census-designated place
- Location of Malcolm in Washington County, Alabama.
- Coordinates: 31°11′36″N 87°59′50″W
- Country: United States
- State: Alabama
- County: Washington

Area
  - Total: 2.39 sq mi (6.19 km^{2})
  - Land: 2.37 sq mi (6.13 km^{2})
  - Water: 0.027 sq mi (0.07 km^{2})
- Elevation: 52 ft (16 m)

Population (2020)
  - Total: 136
  - Density: 57/sq mi (22.2/km^{2})
- Time zone: UTC-6 (Central (CST))
  - Summer (DST): UTC-5 (CDT)
- Area code: 251
- GNIS feature ID: 2628597

Malcolm is a census-designated place and unincorporated community in Washington County, Alabama, United States. As of the 2020 census, Malcolm had a population of 136.

== Demographics ==
Historical population
Census	Pop.	Note	%±
2010	187		—
2020	136		−27.3%
U.S. Decennial Census

Malcolm was first listed as a census designated place in the 2010 U.S. census.

Malcolm CDP, Alabama – Racial and ethnic composition Note: the US Census treats Hispanic/Latino as an ethnic category. This table excludes Latinos from the racial categories and assigns them to a separate category. Hispanics/Latinos may be of any race.
Race / Ethnicity (NH = Non-Hispanic)	Pop 2010	Pop 2020	% 2010	% 2020
White alone (NH)	75	56	40.11%	41.18%
Black or African American alone (NH)	107	63	57.22%	46.32%
Native American or Alaska Native alone (NH)	1	7	0.53%	5.15%
Asian alone (NH)	1	0	0.53%	0.00%
Native Hawaiian or Pacific Islander alone (NH)	0	0	0.00%	0.00%
Other race alone (NH)	0	1	0.00%	0.74%
Mixed race or Multiracial (NH)	3	5	1.60%	3.68%
Hispanic or Latino (any race)	0	4	0.00%	2.94%
Total	187	136	100.00%	100.00%
