= Sims Chapel, Alabama =

- Census-designated place
- Location of Sims Chapel in Washington County, Alabama.
- Coordinates: 31°14′12″N 88°08′35″W
- Country: United States
- State: Alabama
- County: Washington

Area
  - Total: 5.73 sq mi (14.85 km^{2})
  - Land: 5.70 sq mi (14.77 km^{2})
  - Water: 0.031 sq mi (0.08 km^{2})
- Elevation: 112 ft (34 m)

Population (2020)
  - Total: 145
  - Density: 25.4/sq mi (9.82/km^{2})
- Time zone: UTC-6 (Central (CST))
  - Summer (DST): UTC-5 (CDT)
- Area code: 251
- GNIS feature ID: 2632284

Sims Chapel (also Darrah, Grandfield) is a census-designated place and unincorporated community in Washington County, Alabama, United States. As of the 2020 census, Sims Chapel had a population of 145.

== Demographics ==
Historical population
Census	Pop.	Note	%±
2010	153		—
2020	145		−5.2%
U.S. Decennial Census

Sims Chapel was first listed as a census designated place in the 2010 U.S. census.

Sims Chapel CDP, Alabama – Racial and ethnic composition Note: the US Census treats Hispanic/Latino as an ethnic category. This table excludes Latinos from the racial categories and assigns them to a separate category. Hispanics/Latinos may be of any race.
Race / Ethnicity (NH = Non-Hispanic)	Pop 2010	Pop 2020	% 2010	% 2020
White alone (NH)	109	99	71.24%	68.28%
Black or African American alone (NH)	0	1	0.00%	0.69%
Native American or Alaska Native alone (NH)	38	30	24.84%	20.69%
Asian alone (NH)	1	0	0.65%	0.00%
Native Hawaiian or Pacific Islander alone (NH)	0	0	0.00%	0.00%
Other race alone (NH)	0	1	0.00%	0.69%
Mixed race or Multiracial (NH)	2	7	1.31%	4.83%
Hispanic or Latino (any race)	3	7	1.96%	4.83%
Total	153	145	100.00%	100.00%
