= Hobson, Washington County, Alabama =

Hobson, Alabama
- Census-designated place
- Location within Alabama
- Coordinates: 31°29′01″N 88°09′05″W
- Country: United States
- State: Alabama
- County: Washington

Area
  - Total: 2.97 sq mi (7.70 km^{2})
  - Land: 2.95 sq mi (7.63 km^{2})
  - Water: 0.031 sq mi (0.08 km^{2})
- Elevation: 118 ft (36 m)

Population (2020)population_density_km2 = 13.11
  - Total: 100
  - Density: 33.97/sq mi (13.12/km^{2})
- Time zone: UTC-6 (Central (CST))
  - Summer (DST): UTC-5 (CDT)
- Area code: 251
- GNIS feature ID: 2628594

Hobson is a census-designated place and unincorporated community in Washington County, Alabama, United States. Its population was 126 as of the 2010 census.

== Demographics ==
Historical population
Census	Pop.	Note	%±
2010	126		—
2020	100		−20.6%
U.S. Decennial Census

Hobson was first listed as a census designated place in the 2010 U.S. census.

=== 2020 census ===
Hobson CDP, Alabama – Racial and ethnic composition Note: the US Census treats Hispanic/Latino as an ethnic category. This table excludes Latinos from the racial categories and assigns them to a separate category. Hispanics/Latinos may be of any race.
Race / Ethnicity (NH = Non-Hispanic)	Pop 2010	Pop 2020	% 2010	% 2020
White alone (NH)	125	100	99.21%	100.00%
Black or African American alone (NH)	0	0	0.00%	0.00%
Native American or Alaska Native alone (NH)	0	0	0.00%	0.00%
Asian alone (NH)	0	0	0.00%	0.00%
Native Hawaiian or Pacific Islander alone (NH)	0	0	0.00%	0.00%
Other race alone (NH)	0	0	0.00%	0.00%
Mixed race or Multiracial (NH)	1	0	0.79%	0.00%
Hispanic or Latino (any race)	0	0	0.00%	0.00%
Total	126	100	100.00%	100.00%
