= Fairford, Alabama =

- Census-designated place
- Location of Fairford in Washington County, Alabama.
- Coordinates: 31°10′41″N 88°04′22″W
- Country: United States
- State: Alabama
- County: Washington

Area
  - Total: 3.07 sq mi (7.95 km^{2})
  - Land: 3.07 sq mi (7.95 km^{2})
  - Water: 0 sq mi (0.00 km^{2})
- Elevation: 151 ft (46 m)

Population (2020)
  - Total: 161
  - Density: 52.4/sq mi (20.24/km^{2})
- Time zone: UTC-6 (Central (CST))
  - Summer (DST): UTC-5 (CDT)
- Area code: 251
- GNIS feature ID: 2628589

Fairford is a census-designated place and unincorporated community in Washington County, Alabama, United States. As of the 2020 census, Fairford had a population of 161.

== Demographics ==
Historical population
Census	Pop.	Note	%±
2010	186		—
2020	161		−13.4%
U.S. Decennial Census

Fairford was first listed as a census designated place in the 2010 U.S. census.

Fairford CDP, Alabama – Racial and ethnic composition Note: the US Census treats Hispanic/Latino as an ethnic category. This table excludes Latinos from the racial categories and assigns them to a separate category. Hispanics/Latinos may be of any race.
Race / Ethnicity (NH = Non-Hispanic)	Pop 2010	Pop 2020	% 2010	% 2020
White alone (NH)	114	84	61.29%	52.17%
Black or African American alone (NH)	33	12	17.74%	7.45%
Native American or Alaska Native alone (NH)	37	46	19.89%	28.57%
Asian alone (NH)	0	0	0.00%	0.00%
Native Hawaiian or Pacific Islander alone (NH)	0	0	0.00%	0.00%
Other race alone (NH)	0	0	0.00%	0.00%
Mixed race or Multiracial (NH)	2	12	1.08%	7.45%
Hispanic or Latino (any race)	0	7	0.00%	4.35%
Total	186	161	100.00%	100.00%
