= Escatawpa, Alabama =

- Unincorporated community
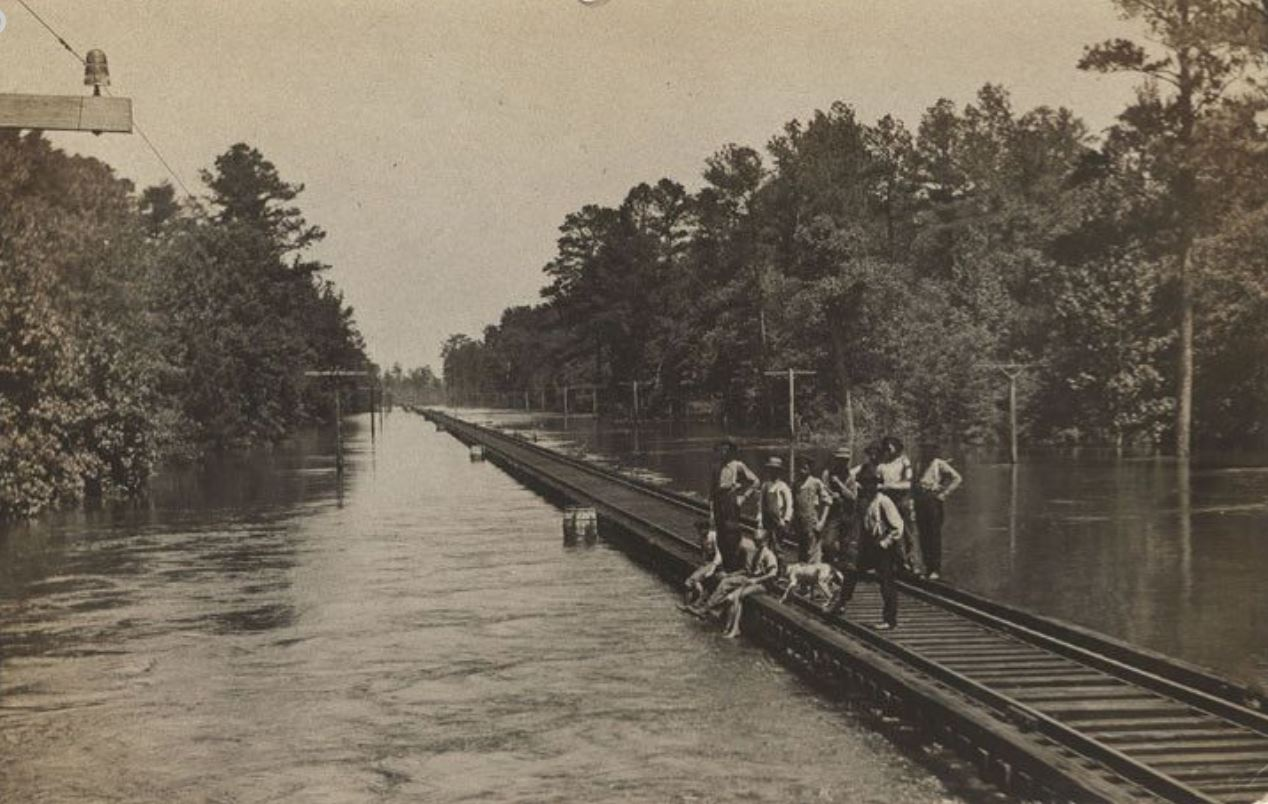
- Flooded railroad bridge on May 7, 1909 in Escatawpa

- Location of Escatawpa in Alabama
- Coordinates: 31°17′23″N 88°23′14″W
- Country: United States
- State: Alabama
- County: Washington
- Elevation: 171 ft (52 m)
- Time zone: UTC-6 (Central (CST))
  - Summer (DST): UTC-5 (CDT)
- GNIS feature ID: 118025

Escatawpa is an unincorporated community in Washington County, Alabama, United States.

== History ==
The community was named after the Escatawpa River. In the Choctaw language, the word "escatawpa" signified a creek where cane was cut, with uski meaning "cane", a meaning "there", and tapa meaning "cut". Escatawpa was located on the Mobile and Ohio Railroad. A post office operated under the name Escatawpa from 1858 to 1953.

In 1909, a traveler from Urbana, Illinois wrote the Champaign-Urbana Courier advising citizens of Urbana to move to the region. He described the area as "a great fruit and vegetable country" and that "fine yellow pine trees are plentiful and cypress trees abound".
