= Yellow Pine, Alabama =

- Unincorporated community
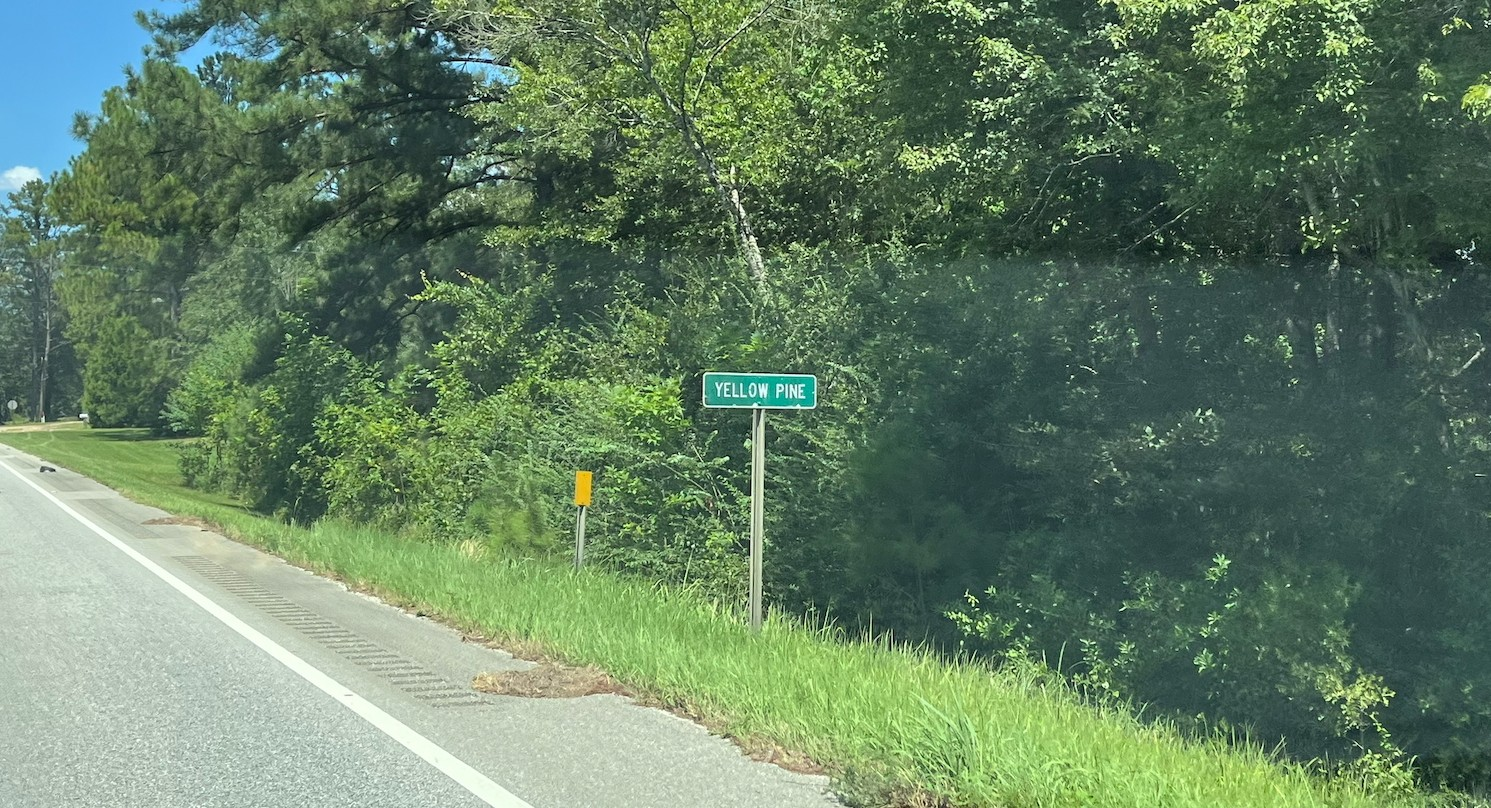
- Sign for Yellow Pine

- Location within Alabama Location within the United States
- Coordinates: 31°24′21″N 88°25′47″W
- Country: United States
- State: Alabama
- County: Washington
- Elevation: 239 ft (73 m)
- Time zone: UTC-6 (Central (CST))
  - Summer (DST): UTC-5 (CDT)
- Area code: 251
- GNIS feature ID: 155314

Yellow Pine is an unincorporated community in Washington County, Alabama, United States. It is the westernmost settlement in the state of Alabama. The elevation is 239 feet.

A post office operated under the name Yellow Pine from 1888 to 1983.

The E. W. Gates Lumber Company operated a sawmill in Yellow Pine. The company also constructed a railroad, the Washington & Choctaw Railroad, to transport lumber.
