= Tibbie, Alabama =

- Census-designated place
- Location of Tibbie in Washington County, Alabama.
- Coordinates: 31°21′44″N 88°14′55″W
- Country: United States
- State: Alabama
- County: Washington

Area
  - Total: 1.76 sq mi (4.57 km^{2})
  - Land: 1.75 sq mi (4.53 km^{2})
  - Water: 0.015 sq mi (0.04 km^{2})
- Elevation: 226 ft (69 m)

Population (2020)
  - Total: 55
  - Density: 31.4/sq mi (12.14/km^{2})
- Time zone: UTC-6 (Central (CST))
  - Summer (DST): UTC-5 (CDT)
- Area code: 251
- GNIS feature ID: 2628606

Tibbie is a census-designated place and unincorporated community in Washington County, Alabama, United States. As of the 2020 census, Tibbie had a population of 55.

The Red Alabama Blackmouth Cur is thought to have originated in the area around Tibbie in the 1940s.

== History ==
The name Tibbie comes from a shortened form of the Choctaw word "oakibbeha". Oakibbeha means "blocks of ice therein," with okti meaning "ice" and the plural form abeha meaning "to be in".

A post office first began operations under the name Tibbie in 1910.

== Demographics ==
Historical population
Census	Pop.	Note	%±
2010	41		—
2020	55		34.1%
U.S. Decennial Census

Tibbie was first listed as a census designated place in the 2010 U.S. census.

Tibbie CDP, Alabama – Racial and ethnic composition Note: the US Census treats Hispanic/Latino as an ethnic category. This table excludes Latinos from the racial categories and assigns them to a separate category. Hispanics/Latinos may be of any race.
Race / ethnicity (NH = Non-Hispanic)	Pop 2010	Pop 2020	% 2010	% 2020
White alone (NH)	36	47	87.80%	85.45%
Black or African American alone (NH)	0	0	0.00%	0.00%
Native American or Alaska Native alone (NH)	3	1	7.32%	1.82%
Asian alone (NH)	0	0	0.00%	0.00%
Native Hawaiian or Pacific Islander alone (NH)	0	0	0.00%	0.00%
Other race alone (NH)	0	0	0.00%	0.00%
Mixed race or Multiracial (NH)	0	4	0.00%	7.27%
Hispanic or Latino (any race)	2	3	4.88%	5.45%
Total	41	55	100.00%	100.00%
