= Laton Hill, Alabama =

- Unincorporated community
- Location within Alabama Location within the United States
- Coordinates: 31°29′21″N 88°22′05″W
- Country: United States
- State: Alabama
- County: Washington
- Elevation: 259 ft (79 m)
- Time zone: UTC-6 (Central (CST))
  - Summer (DST): UTC-5 (CDT)
- Area code: 251
- GNIS feature ID: 138939

Laton Hill is an unincorporated community in Washington County, Alabama, United States, located on Alabama State Route 56, 6.0 miles (9.7 km) west of Chatom.
