= Millry, Alabama =

- Town
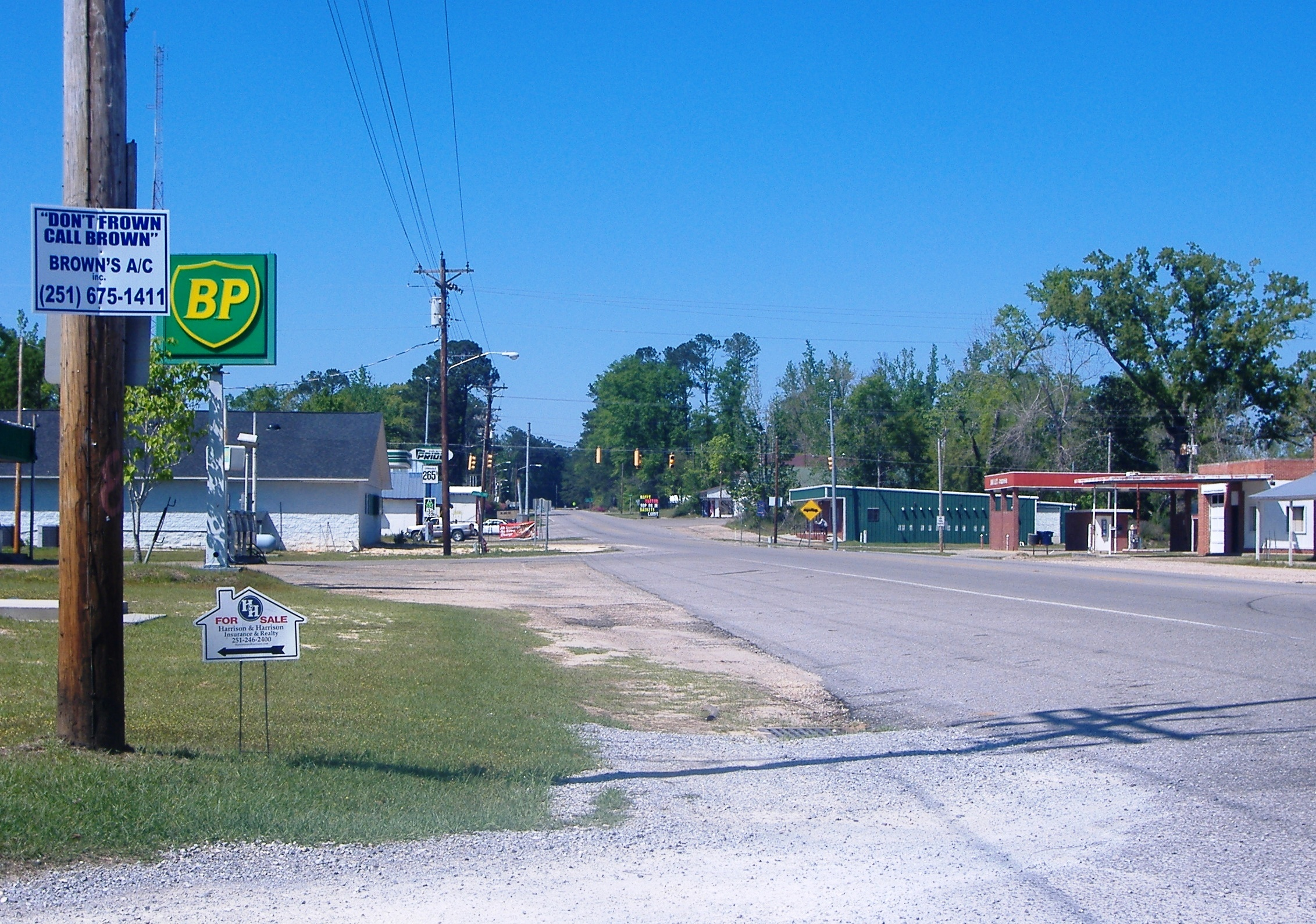
- Street scene in Millry

- Location of Millry in Washington County, Alabama
- Coordinates: 31°37′16″N 88°19′04″W
- Country: United States
- State: Alabama
- County: Washington

Area
  - Total: 7.51 sq mi (19.46 km^{2})
  - Land: 7.49 sq mi (19.40 km^{2})
  - Water: 0.023 sq mi (0.06 km^{2})
- Elevation: 121 ft (37 m)

Population (2020)
  - Total: 450
  - Density: 60/sq mi (23.2/km^{2})
- Time zone: UTC-6 (Central (CST))
  - Summer (DST): UTC-5 (CDT)
- ZIP code: 36558
- Area code: 251
- FIPS code: 01-48832
- GNIS feature ID: 2406165
- Website: millryalabama.com

Millry is a town in Washington County, Alabama, United States. According to the 1950 U.S. Census records, it incorporated in 1947. As of the 2020 census, Millry had a population of 450.

== Geography ==
According to the U.S. Census Bureau, the town has a total area of 7.8 square miles (20 km^{2}), of which 7.7 square miles (20 km^{2}) is land and 0.04 square miles (0.10 km^{2}) (0.39%) is water.

== Demographics ==
Historical population
Census	Pop.	Note	%±
1950	607		—
1960	645		6.3%
1970	911		41.2%
1980	956		4.9%
1990	781		−18.3%
2000	615		−21.3%
2010	546		−11.2%
2020	450		−17.6%
U.S. Decennial Census; 2013 Estimate

As of the census of 2000, there were 615 people, 262 households, and 175 families residing in the town. The population density was 79.7 inhabitants per square mile (30.8/km^{2}). There were 301 housing units at an average density of 39.0 per square mile (15.1/km^{2}). The racial makeup of the town was 63.41% White, 35.45% Black or African American, 0.81% Native American, and 0.33% from two or more races. 0.65% of the population were Hispanic or Latino of any race.

There were 262 households, out of which 27.1% had children under the age of 18 living with them, 51.1% were married couples living together, 13.4% had a female householder with no husband present, and 33.2% were non-families. 30.9% of all households were made up of individuals, and 15.6% had someone living alone who was 65 years of age or older. The average household size was 2.35 and the average family size was 2.93.

In the town, the population was spread out, with 22.6% under the age of 18, 9.3% from 18 to 24, 23.1% from 25 to 44, 28.0% from 45 to 64, and 17.1% who were 65 years of age or older. The median age was 42 years. For every 100 females, there were 89.2 males. For every 100 females age 18 and over, there were 83.1 males.

The median income for a household in the town was $24,886, and the median income for a family was $32,500. Males had a median income of $36,667 versus $17,917 for females. The per capita income for the town was $14,782. About 17.7% of families and 21.2% of the population were below the poverty line, including 21.1% of those under age 18 and 29.2% of those age 65 or over.
