= Deer Park, Alabama =

- Census-designated place
- Location of Deer Park in Washington County, Alabama.
- Coordinates: 31°13′11″N 88°19′21″W
- Country: United States
- State: Alabama
- County: Washington

Area
  - Total: 3.19 sq mi (8.26 km^{2})
  - Land: 3.12 sq mi (8.09 km^{2})
  - Water: 0.062 sq mi (0.16 km^{2})
- Elevation: 135 ft (41 m)

Population (2020)
  - Total: 141
  - Density: 45.1/sq mi (17.42/km^{2})
- Time zone: UTC-6 (Central (CST))
  - Summer (DST): UTC-5 (CDT)
- ZIP code: 36529
- Area code: 251
- GNIS feature ID: 2628587

Deer Park is an unincorporated community and census-designated place in Washington County, Alabama, United States. As of the 2020 census, Deer Park had a population of 141. Although a ghost town by 1966, Deer Park is 17.5 miles (28.2 km) south-southwest of Chatom. Deer Park has a post office with ZIP code 36529.

== History ==
By 1854, the Mobile and Ohio Railroad had laid track and built a train station at Deer Park.

== Demographics ==
Historical population
Census	Pop.	Note	%±
2010	188		—
2020	141		−25.0%
U.S. Decennial Census

Deer park was first listed as a census designated place in the 2010 U.S. census.

Deer Park CDP, Alabama – Racial and ethnic composition Note: the US Census treats Hispanic/Latino as an ethnic category. This table excludes Latinos from the racial categories and assigns them to a separate category. Hispanics/Latinos may be of any race.
Race / Ethnicity (NH = Non-Hispanic)	Pop 2010	Pop 2020	% 2010	% 2020
White alone (NH)	60	50	31.91%	35.46%
Black or African American alone (NH)	125	79	66.49%	56.03%
Native American or Alaska Native alone (NH)	0	6	0.00%	4.26%
Asian alone (NH)	0	1	0.00%	0.71%
Native Hawaiian or Pacific Islander alone (NH)	0	0	0.00%	0.00%
Other race alone (NH)	0	0	0.00%	0.00%
Mixed race or Multiracial (NH)	0	5	0.00%	3.55%
Hispanic or Latino (any race)	3	0	1.60%	0.00%
Total	188	141	100.00%	100.00%

== Notable people ==
- Jeff Kelly - former National Football League quarterback
- Beverly Jo Scott - singer-songwriter, was born in Deer Park in 1959
