= Tyler, Alabama =

- Unincorporated community
- Location in Alabama Tyler (the United States)
- Coordinates: 32°20′21″N 86°52′47″W
- Country: United States
- State: Alabama
- County: Dallas
- Elevation: 203 ft (62 m)
- Time zone: UTC-6 (Central (CST))
  - Summer (DST): UTC-5 (CDT)
- ZIP code: 36785
- Area code: 334
- GNIS feature ID: 128235

Tyler is an unincorporated community in Dallas County, Alabama. Tyler, Alabama was featured in Verse 34 of the Whitman, Alabama project.
