= Washington County, Alabama =

County in Alabama, United States

- County
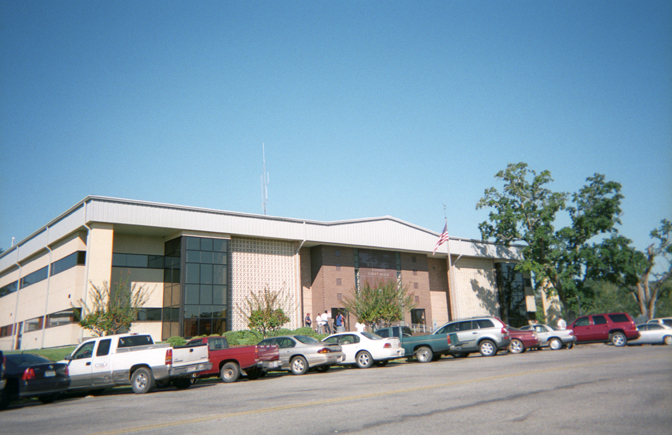
- The Washington County Courthouse in September 2007

- Flag

- Location within the U.S. state of Alabama
- Coordinates: 31°24′33″N 88°12′41″W
- Country: United States
- State: Alabama
- Founded: June 4, 1801
- Named for: George Washington
- Seat: Chatom
- Largest town: Chatom

Area
  - Total: 1,089 sq mi (2,820 km^{2})
  - Land: 1,080 sq mi (2,800 km^{2})
  - Water: 8.4 sq mi (22 km^{2}) 0.8%

Population (2020)
  - Total: 15,388
  - Estimate (2025): 14,822 ▼
  - Density: 14.2/sq mi (5.50/km^{2})
- Time zone: UTC−6 (Central)
  - Summer (DST): UTC−5 (CDT)
- Congressional district: 2nd
- Website: https://wcalabama.com/
- County Number 65 on Alabama Licence Plates

Washington County is a county located in the southwestern part of the U.S. state of Alabama. As of the 2020 census, the population was 15,388. The county seat is Chatom. The county was named in honor of George Washington, the first President of the United States. In September 2018 The United States Office of Management and Budget (OMB) added Washington County to the Mobile, Alabama Metropolitan Statistical Area but was removed in July 2023.

The MOWA Band of Choctaw Indians is the first state-recognized tribe in Alabama. It is based in Washington County, with some members also in Mobile County, Alabama. A total of nine tribes have received state recognition since 1979.

== History ==
The area of today's Washington County was long inhabited by various indigenous people. In historic times, European traders encountered first Choctaw, whose territory extended through most of present-day Mississippi, and later Creek Indians, who had moved southwest from Georgia ahead of early European settlers who were encroaching on their land. Smaller numbers of free Black settlers had begun to arrive by 1800.

Washington County was organized on June 4, 1800, from the Tombigbee District of the Mississippi Territory by proclamation of territorial governor Winthrop Sargent. It was the first county organized in what would later become Alabama, as settlers moved westward after the American Revolutionary War. Washington County is the site of St. Stephens, the first territorial capital of Alabama. In 1807 former U.S. Vice President Aaron Burr was arrested at Wakefield in Washington County, during his flight from being prosecuted for alleged treason (of which he was eventually found innocent).

In the 1830s, the U.S. government removed most of the Choctaw and Creek to Indian Territory (now Oklahoma) west of the Mississippi River. Some members of these tribes stayed behind on their traditional lands in southwest Alabama. They were nominally considered state (and U.S.) citizens, but suffered severe racial discrimination.

In the 19th century, the county was largely developed for cotton plantations, with labor supplied by thousands of enslaved African Americans. Many had been transported by slave traders to the Deep South in a forced migration in the early part of the century, as the land was being developed.

During the American Civil War, more than three quarters of the adult white men in the county were serving in the Confederate Army by 1863. In that year, a group of children petitioned the Confederate government to avoid drafting more white men, so they might serve as a home guard militia. The petition claimed the militia was needed to guard against a potential slave uprising, since there were numerous cotton plantations with large numbers of enslaved African Americans. No such uprising occurred.

While the county continued to rely on agriculture into the 20th century, the infestation of the boll weevil destroyed many cotton crops. Mechanization and industrial-scale agriculture reduced the need for labor. Thousands of African Americans left the South in the Great Migration to Northern and Midwestern industrial cities, where they could get better jobs and escape the legal segregation and violence of the South. In the early 20th century industrialists began to harvest and process the pine and other timber in this area of the state.

While the timber industry continued to be important to the economy, the county has gradually developed other businesses and industries, particularly petrochemical. Due to damage from Hurricane Frederic in 1979, the county was declared a disaster area that September.

== Geography ==
According to the United States Census Bureau, the county has a total area of 1,089 square miles (2,820 km^{2}), of which 1,080 square miles (2,800 km^{2}) is land and 8.4 square miles (22 km^{2}) (0.8%) is water. This makes Washington County larger than the state of Rhode Island in terms of land area (but not total area). The county is located approximately 60 miles north of the Gulf of Mexico, and exceeds 682,000 acres of land. About 88 percent of the land area is covered by forest and pine plantations.

The Tombigbee River borders Washington County to the east. From the southern point of the river, the boundary runs diagonally south-west, bisecting the community of Calvert. From there, the southern boundary runs west, roughly following the 31°08' N parallel, toward the Mississippi state line, descending due south into Mobile County and forming part of a rectangle that connects with the state line. The western boundary is defined by the Alabama-Mississippi state line (approximately 88°27' W). The northern boundary runs west from the state line along the 31°41' N parallel until reaching the Tombigbee River.

=== Adjacent counties ===
- Choctaw County (north)
- Clarke County (east)
- Baldwin County (southeast)
- Mobile County (south)
- Greene County, Mississippi (southwest)
- Wayne County, Mississippi (northwest)

== Transportation ==
=== Major highways ===
- U.S. Highway 43 / State Route 13 (unsigned)
- U.S. Highway 45
- State Route 17
- State Route 56
- State Route 57 (unsigned)

=== Railroad ===
The Norfolk Southern Railroad runs north out of the Port of Mobile and along the eastern corridor of Washington County, providing transport of raw materials to several chemical and electrical plants situated along the Tombigbee River.

== Demographics ==
Historical population
Census	Pop.	Note	%±
1800	1,250		—
1810	2,920		133.6%
1820	4,118		41.0%
1830	3,474		−15.6%
1840	5,300		52.6%
1850	2,713		−48.8%
1860	4,669		72.1%
1870	3,912		−16.2%
1880	4,538		16.0%
1890	7,935		74.9%
1900	11,134		40.3%
1910	14,454		29.8%
1920	14,279		−1.2%
1930	16,365		14.6%
1940	16,188		−1.1%
1950	15,612		−3.6%
1960	15,372		−1.5%
1970	16,241		5.7%
1980	16,821		3.6%
1990	16,694		−0.8%
2000	18,097		8.4%
2010	17,581		−2.9%
2020	15,388		−12.5%
2025 (est.)	14,822	▼	−3.7%
U.S. Decennial Census; 1790–1960 1900–1990; 1990–2000 2010–2020

=== 2020 Census ===
Washington County, Alabama – Racial and ethnic composition Note: the US Census treats Hispanic/Latino as an ethnic category. This table excludes Latinos from the racial categories and assigns them to a separate category. Hispanics/Latinos may be of any race.
Race / Ethnicity (NH = Non-Hispanic)	Pop 2000	Pop 2010	Pop 2020	% 2000	% 2010	% 2020
White alone (NH)	11,673	11,455	10,267	64.50%	65.16%	66.72%
Black or African American alone (NH)	4,818	4,360	3,318	26.62%	24.80%	21.56%
Native American or Alaska Native alone (NH)	1,282	1,394	1,102	7.08%	7.93%	7.16%
Asian alone (NH)	10	18	14	0.06%	0.10%	0.09%
Pacific Islander alone (NH)	5	9	2	0.03%	0.05%	0.01%
Other race alone (NH)	1	8	23	0.01%	0.05%	0.15%
Mixed race or Multiracial (NH)	148	186	524	0.82%	1.06%	3.41%
Hispanic or Latino (any race)	160	151	138	0.88%	0.86%	0.90%
Total	18,097	17,581	15,388	100.00%	100.00%	100.00%

As of the 2020 United States census, the county had a population of 15,388. The median age was 44.4 years. 21.5% of residents were under the age of 18 and 21.1% of residents were 65 years of age or older. For every 100 females there were 96.5 males, and for every 100 females age 18 and over there were 94.0 males age 18 and over.

The racial makeup of the county was 67.0% White, 21.6% Black or African American, 7.2% American Indian and Alaska Native, 0.1% Asian, 0.0% Native Hawaiian and Pacific Islander, 0.4% from some other race, and 3.7% from two or more races. Hispanic or Latino residents of any race comprised 0.9% of the population.

0.0% of residents lived in urban areas, while 100.0% lived in rural areas.

There were 6,321 households in the county, of which 29.3% had children under the age of 18 living with them and 28.0% had a female householder with no spouse or partner present. About 29.9% of all households were made up of individuals and 14.4% had someone living alone who was 65 years of age or older.

There were 7,712 housing units, of which 18.0% were vacant. Among occupied housing units, 82.9% were owner-occupied and 17.1% were renter-occupied. The homeowner vacancy rate was 1.3% and the rental vacancy rate was 9.4%.

=== 2010 ===
According to the 2010 United States census, the racial makeup of the county is as follows:

- 65.5% White(non-Hispanic)
- 24.9% Black
- 8.0% Native American
- 0.1% Asian
- 0.0% Native Hawaiian or Pacific Islander
- 1.2% Two or more races
- 0.9% Hispanic or Latino (of any race)

=== 2000 ===
As of the census of 2000, there were 18,097 people, 6,705 households, and 5,042 families residing in the county. The population density was 17 people per square mile (6.6 people/km^{2}). There were 8,123 housing units at an average density of 8 units per square mile (3.1 units/km^{2}). The racial makeup of the county was 64.98% White(non-Hispanic), 26.89% Black or African American, 7.12% Native American, 0.06% Asian, 0.03% Pacific Islander, 0.05% from other races, and 0.87% from two or more races. 1.1% of the population were Hispanic or Latino of any race.

There were 6,705 households, out of which 37.90% had children under the age of 18 living with them, 59.10% were married couples living together, 12.50% had a female householder with no husband present, and 24.80% were non-families. 22.80% of all households were made up of individuals, and 10.10% had someone living alone who was 65 years of age or older. The average household size was 2.69 and the average family size was 3.17.

In the county, the population was spread out, with 28.70% under the age of 18, 8.60% from 18 to 24, 27.40% from 25 to 44, 22.90% from 45 to 64, and 12.40% who were 65 years of age or older. The median age was 35 years. For every 100 females there were 96.10 males. For every 100 females age 18 and over, there were 91.10 males.

The median income for a household in the county was $30,815, and the median income for a family was $37,881. Males had a median income of $35,237 versus $18,337 for females. The per capita income for the county was $14,081. About 14.80% of families and 18.50% of the population were below the poverty line, including 21.50% of those under age 18 and 22.70% of those age 65 or over.

=== Population decline ===
Like many rural Alabama counties, Washington County has had rural flight since 2000, as younger people have moved to cities for work opportunities. Factors contributing to this phenomenon include depressed economic opportunity within the county and the ongoing urbanization of the United States. Urbanization, especially urban areas adjacent to a rural area, draws young people out of rural areas, offering more and better public services as well as access to better-paying, white-collar jobs.

== Education ==
The Washington County School system operates public schools in the county. Its high schools include:

- Fruitdale High School
- Leroy High School
- McIntosh High School
- Millry High School
- Washington County High School

== Politics ==
Like much of the Deep South, prior to the Civil Rights Movement of the 1960s, only white Washington County voters enjoyed the franchise, and they had long supported the Democratic Party in national, state and local elections. Most blacks had been disenfranchised since the turn of the century, as were many poor whites.

After Congress passed civil rights legislation under the leadership of President Lyndon Johnson, in addition to legislation to support his Great Society policies, the county's conservative white electorate began to support Republican candidates in presidential elections. With revival of their constitutional rights in voting, African Americans tended to align with the national Democratic Party.

Following the presidency of Ronald Reagan and the rise of the Moral Majority of the 1980s, conservative white Washington County voters have increasingly elected Republicans in national elections, and they have essentially realigned with that party. Bill Clinton, a nominee from Arkansas, was the last Democratic presidential nominee to win Washington County, doing so in his successful 1996 reelection campaign. By contrast, the minority of African American and Native American voters continue to support Democratic candidates.

United States presidential election results for Washington County, Alabama
Year	Republican		Democratic		Third party(ies)	
Year	No.	%	No.	%	No.	%
1904	54	10.57%	443	86.69%	14	2.74%
1908	40	7.52%	464	87.22%	28	5.26%
1912	14	3.12%	405	90.20%	30	6.68%
1916	32	5.95%	500	92.94%	6	1.12%
1920	85	12.82%	575	86.73%	3	0.45%
1924	55	8.11%	610	89.97%	13	1.92%
1928	515	41.73%	718	58.18%	1	0.08%
1932	81	5.83%	1,307	94.10%	1	0.07%
1936	72	3.95%	1,736	95.28%	14	0.77%
1940	80	4.04%	1,892	95.65%	6	0.30%
1944	115	7.33%	1,447	92.28%	6	0.38%
1948	31	2.31%	0	0.00%	1,313	97.69%
1952	623	23.90%	1,977	75.83%	7	0.27%
1956	777	30.25%	1,705	66.37%	87	3.39%
1960	792	28.53%	1,929	69.49%	55	1.98%
1964	2,803	70.18%	0	0.00%	1,191	29.82%
1968	200	3.52%	902	15.87%	4,581	80.61%
1972	3,282	74.73%	1,096	24.95%	14	0.32%
1976	2,171	38.29%	3,471	61.22%	28	0.49%
1980	3,045	45.96%	3,520	53.13%	60	0.91%
1984	4,434	58.78%	3,081	40.85%	28	0.37%
1988	3,741	52.23%	3,402	47.49%	20	0.28%
1992	3,270	40.06%	4,046	49.57%	846	10.37%
1996	2,900	37.68%	3,935	51.12%	862	11.20%
2000	4,117	54.20%	3,386	44.58%	93	1.22%
2004	5,060	61.36%	3,145	38.14%	42	0.51%
2008	5,654	64.43%	3,067	34.95%	54	0.62%
2012	5,761	65.56%	2,976	33.87%	50	0.57%
2016	6,042	70.81%	2,374	27.82%	117	1.37%
2020	6,564	73.95%	2,258	25.44%	54	0.61%
2024	6,534	77.41%	1,863	22.07%	44	0.52%

United States Senate election results for Washington County, Alabama2
Year	Republican		Democratic		Third party(ies)	
Year	No.	%	No.	%	No.	%
2020	6,162	69.98%	2,635	29.92%	9	0.10%

United States Senate election results for Washington County, Alabama3
Year	Republican		Democratic		Third party(ies)	
Year	No.	%	No.	%	No.	%
2022	4,557	77.53%	1,267	21.55%	54	0.92%

Alabama Gubernatorial election results for Washington County
Year	Republican		Democratic		Third party(ies)	
Year	No.	%	No.	%	No.	%
2022	4,584	77.31%	1,206	20.34%	139	2.34%

While Democrats, until 2015, continued to represent the county in both houses of the state legislature, voters have not supported a Democratic candidate for governor since 2002. That year the state's last Democratic governor, Don Siegelman, lost reelection to Republican Bob Riley.

As of 2021, Brett Easterbrook (R-Fruitdale) has represented Washington County in the Alabama House of Representatives (District 65) since 2018. Greg Albritton (R-Excel) has represented Senate District 22, the bulk of the county (along with parts of seven other counties, stretching into south Baldwin County and as far north as Choctaw County, and from the Mississippi border on the west to as far east as the Escambia-Covington County border and Conecuh-Butler county border) in the Alabama Senate since 2015. An eastern sliver of the county along the Tombigbee falls in District 23, represented by Hank Sanders.

The county lies within Alabama's 1st congressional district, which has been represented by Republican Jerry Carl since January 2021.

== Communities ==
=== Towns ===
- Chatom (county seat)
- McIntosh
- Millry

=== Census-designated places ===
- Calvert (partly in Mobile County)
- Cullomburg (partly in Choctaw County)
- Deer Park
- Fairford
- Fruitdale
- Hobson
- Leroy
- Malcolm
- St. Stephens
- Sims Chapel
- Tibbie
- Vinegar Bend

=== Unincorporated communities ===
- Cortelyou
- Escatawpa
- Frankville
- Laton Hill
- Sunflower
- Wagarville
- Yellow Pine
- Yarbo

=== Ghost town ===
- Wakefield

== Places of interest ==
Washington County has three sites listed on the National Register of Historic Places:

- Andrews Chapel in McIntosh
- Old Washington County Courthouse
- Old St. Stephens Site in St. Stephens.

The Washington County Museum is located in the courthouse in Chatom.

== Notable people ==
- Wilmer Mizell (1930–1999) was born in Vinegar Bend. He was a left-handed pitcher in major league baseball. After his sports career, he was elected to three terms as a Republican congressman. He represented North Carolina's 5th congressional district from 1969 to 1975, after white conservatives began electing Republican candidates.
- Beverly Jo Scott, singer-songwriter who lives and works in Belgium, was born in Deer Park in 1959.
- Shawna Thompson, a singer and part of the country music duo Thompson Square, is from Chatom.
- Sammie Coates, former professional football player

== See also ==
- National Register of Historic Places listings in Washington County, Alabama
- Properties on the Alabama Register of Landmarks and Heritage in Washington County, Alabama
