= Yarbo, Alabama =

- Unincorporated community
- Location of Yarbo in Alabama
- Coordinates: 31°32′38″N 88°16′40″W
- Country: United States
- State: Alabama
- County: Washington
- Elevation: 180 ft (55 m)
- Time zone: UTC-6 (Central (CST))
  - Summer (DST): UTC-5 (CDT)
- GNIS feature ID: 129271

Yarbo (known as Yarboro) is an unincorporated community in Washington County, Alabama, United States.

== History ==
Yarbo is a shortened form of Yarborough and is named for the first postmaster, Robert E. Yarborough. A post office operated under the name Yarbo from 1917 to 1954. In 1918, the Ingram-Day Lumber Company, based in Lyman, Mississippi, purchased the Yarborough Lumber Company's plant in Yarbo. The plant was able to produce up to 40,000 feet of lumber per day. Dry kilns were eventually installed at the plant in Yarbo.
