= Alabama State Route 605 =

State highway in Alabama, United States

State Route 605

Route information
- Maintained by ALDOT
- Length: 23.420 mi (37.691 km)
- Existed: December 2012–present

Major junctions
- South end: US 231 south of Madrid
- SR 109 in Rehobeth; SR 52 in Taylor; US 84 in Dothan
- North end: US 231 in Midland City

Location
- Country: United States
- State: Alabama
- Counties: Houston, Dale

Highway system
- Alabama State Highway System; Interstate; US; State
← I-565	→ I-685

State Route 605 (SR 605) is a 23.420-mile-long (37.691 km) state highway in Houston and Dale counties in the southeastern part of the U.S. state of Alabama. The southern terminus of the highway is at an intersection with U.S. Route 231 (US 231) south of Madrid. The northern terminus of the route is at another intersection with US 231 in Midland City.

== Route description ==
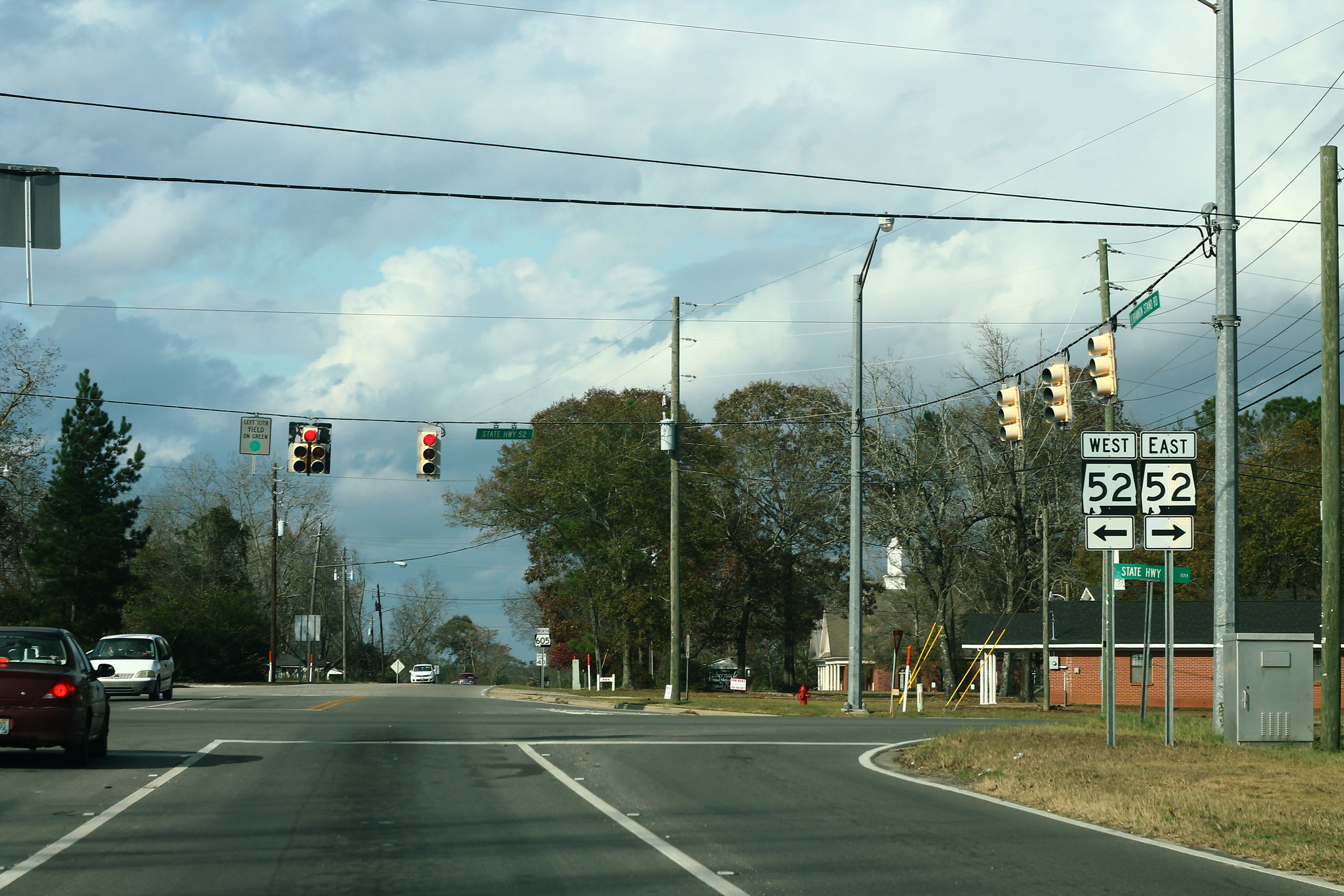
SR 605 at SR 52 in Taylor

SR 605 begins at an intersection with US 231 (South Oates Street; unsigned SR 1) south of Madrid. It travels to the north-northwest and enters Madrid. The highway cuts through the southwestern corner of the town. It curves to the northwest and leaves the city limits of Madrid. In Garretts Crossroads, it curves to the north-northeast and travels through Big Creek. After a crossing of Big Creek, it curves to the north-northwest and enters Rehobeth for a very brief distance. It leaves the city limits of Rehobeth and then re-enters the town. After another short distance out of the city limits, the highway intersects SR 109 on the southern edge of the town. SR 605 curves back to the north-northwest and crosses over Harkin Branch. It travels just to the west of Rehobeth Middle School and then leaves Rehobeth for the final time. Right after leaving Rehobeth, it enters Taylor. It travels just to the southwest of Lochenglen Lake. It curves to the north and passes the city hall of Taylor. After it intersects SR 52 (Hartford Highway), it leaves Taylor. After traveling through Peterman, it travels through Jones Crossroads and then enters the western reaches of Dothan. The highway curves to the north-northeast and crosses over Beaver Creek. It begins to curve to the north-northwest and intersects US 84 (West Main Street). It then crosses over the Little Choctawhatchee River. It leaves the city limits of Dothan and heads to the north-northeast. After a curve back to the northwest, it enters Dale County. The highway intersects the western terminus of County Route 10 (CR 10, Mance Newton Road) just before crossing over Harrison Mill Creek. The highway then intersects the eastern terminus of CR 554 (Hawkins Hill Road). Almost immediately, SR 605 enters Midland City. There, it reaches its northern terminus, a second intersection with US 231. Here, the roadway continues as CR 59.

== History ==
SR 605 was created in December 2012 through a road swap between Houston County and the Alabama Department of Transportation (ALDOT). As part of the swap, a portion of SR 95 in eastern Houston County became a county road.

== Major intersections ==
County	Location	mi	km	Destinations	Notes
Houston		0.000	0.000	US 231 (South Oates Street / SR 1) – Panama City, Dothan	Southern terminus
Houston	Rehobeth	7.843	12.622	SR 109 – Graceville, Chipley, Panama City Beach	
Houston	Taylor	14.052	22.615	SR 52 (Hartford Highway) – Hartford, Dothan	
Houston	Dothan	18.418	29.641	US 84 (West Main Street / SR 12) – Enterprise	
Dale	Midland City	23.420	37.691	US 231 (SR 53) / CR 59 north – Dothan, Troy	Northern terminus of SR 605; southern terminus of CR 59
1.000 mi = 1.609 km; 1.000 km = 0.621 mi
