= Alabama State Route 109 =

State highway in Alabama, United States

State Route 109

Route information
- Maintained by ALDOT
- Length: 9.907 mi (15.944 km)
- Existed: 1946–present

Major junctions
- South end: SR 77 at the Florida state line near Graceville, FL
- North end: US 231 north of Madrid

Location
- Country: United States
- State: Alabama

Highway system
- Alabama State Highway System; Interstate; US; State
← SR 108	→ SR 110

State Route 109 (SR 109) is a 9.907-mile-long (15.944 km) state highway in Houston County, in the southeastern part of the U.S. state of Alabama. The route begins at the Florida state line, where it continues south as State Road 77 (SR 77) toward Graceville, and travels north to U.S. Route 231 (US 231) north of Madrid. The highway is maintained by the Alabama Department of Transportation and serves as a connector between Graceville and the Dothan area, intersecting State Route 605 (SR 605) in Rehobeth.

== Route description ==
SR 109 is a two-lane highway that runs entirely through eastern Houston County. The route begins at the Florida state line, where the roadway continues south as State Road 77 (SR 77) toward Graceville. From the state line, SR 109 travels north through a rural area of the county, providing a connection between communities in southeastern Alabama and the Graceville area. The highway passes through the community of Rehobeth, where it intersects State Route 605 (SR 605). Continuing north, SR 109 reaches its northern terminus at U.S. Route 231 (US 231), which also carries State Route 1 (SR 1), north of Madrid.

== Major intersections ==
The entire route is in Houston County.

Location	mi	km	Destinations	Notes
	0.000	0.000	SR 77 south to I-10 – Graceville, Chipley, Panama City Beach	Southern terminus; Florida state line
Rehobeth	7.400	11.909	SR 605	
	9.907	15.944	US 231 (SR 1) – Dothan, Madrid	Northern terminus
1.000 mi = 1.609 km; 1.000 km = 0.621 mi
