= Peterman =

Peterman may refer to:

== People ==
- J. Peterman (disambiguation)
- Jocelyn Peterman, Canadian curler
- John Peterman, American businessman
- Harold Peterman, American politician
- Melissa Peterman, American actress
- Mykyta Peterman, Ukrainian football player
- Nathan Peterman, American football player

== Places ==
- Peterman, Alabama (disambiguation), several places
  - Peterman, Houston County, Alabama
  - Peterman, Monroe County, Alabama

== Other uses ==
- A slang term for a Safecracker

== See also ==
- Petermann (disambiguation)
