= 1956 United States presidential election in Alabama =

- November 6, 1956

Nominee	Adlai Stevenson	Dwight D. Eisenhower
Party	Democratic	Republican
Home state	Illinois	Pennsylvania (Note: Although he was born in Texas and grew up in Kansas before his military career, at the time of the 1952 election Eisenhower was president of Columbia University and was, officially, a resident of New York. During his first term as president, he moved his private residence to Gettysburg, Pennsylvania, and officially changed his residency to Pennsylvania.)
Running mate	Estes Kefauver	Richard Nixon
Electoral vote	10 (Note: A faithless elector cast their vote for Alabama judge Walter Burgwyn Jones and former Georgia governor Herman Talmadge as vice president.)	0
Popular vote	280,844	195,694
Percentage	56.52%	39.39%
County results
Stevenson
40–50%
50–60%
60–70%
70–80%
80–90%
Eisenhower
40–50%
50–60%
60–70%
President before election
Dwight D. Eisenhower
Republican
Elected President
Dwight D. Eisenhower
Republican

The 1956 United States presidential election in Alabama took place on November 6, 1956, as part of the 1956 United States presidential election. Alabama voters chose eleven representatives, or electors, to the Electoral College, who voted for president and vice president. In Alabama, voters voted for electors individually instead of as a slate, as in the other states.

Since the 1890s, Alabama had been effectively a one-party state ruled by the Democratic Party. Disenfranchisement of almost all African-Americans and a large proportion of poor whites via poll taxes, literacy tests and informal harassment had essentially eliminated opposition parties outside of Unionist Winston County and presidential campaigns in a few nearby northern hill counties. The only competitive statewide elections during this period were thus Democratic Party primaries — limited to white voters until the landmark court case of Smith v. Allwright, following which Alabama introduced the Boswell Amendment — ruled unconstitutional in Davis v. Schnell in 1949, although substantial increases in black voter registration would not occur until after the late 1960s Voting Rights Act.

Unlike other Deep South states, the state GOP would after disenfranchisement rapidly and permanently turn “lily-white”, with the last black delegates at any Republican National Convention serving in 1920. Nevertheless, Republicans only briefly gained from their hard lily-white policy by exceeding forty percent in three 1920 House of Representatives races, and in the 1928 presidential election when Senator James Thomas Heflin embarked on a nationwide speaking tour, partially funded by the Ku Klux Klan, against Roman Catholic Democratic nominee Al Smith, so that Republican Herbert Hoover lost by only seven thousand votes.

Following Smith, Alabama's loyalty to the national Democratic Party would be broken when Harry S. Truman, seeking a strategy to win the Cold War against the radically egalitarian rhetoric of Communism, launched the first Civil Rights bill since Reconstruction. Southern Democrats became enraged and for the 1948 presidential election, Alabama's Democratic presidential elector primary chose electors who were pledged to not vote for incumbent President Truman. Truman was entirely excluded from the Alabama ballot, and Alabama's electoral votes went to Strom Thurmond — labelled as the “Democratic” nominee — by a margin only slightly smaller than Franklin D. Roosevelt’s four victories. Despite this, in 1950 loyalists regained control of the ruling party and few would support Republican nominee Dwight D. Eisenhower in the 1952 presidential election.

In the four ensuing years, Alabama’s ruling elite was jolted by the Supreme Court’s Brown v. Board of Education ruling, which ruled unconstitutional the de jure segregated school system in the South. The state attempted to use the doctrine of “interposition” to place its sovereignty above the Court and maintain de jure segregation, although incumbent Governor Jim Folsom viewed the idea as futile despite signing the statutes. The state would also be affected by the Montgomery bus boycott, and as a result an independent elector slate, not pledged to any candidate, would be nominated.

== Predictions ==
Source	Ranking	As of
The Philadelphia Inquirer	Safe D	October 26, 1956
The Sunday Star	Safe D	October 28, 1956
The Birmingham News	Likely D	November 4, 1956
Chattanooga Daily Times	Likely D	November 4, 1956

== Results ==
General election results
Party	Pledged to	Elector	Votes
Democratic Party	Adlai Stevenson II	Jasse Brown	280,844
Democratic Party	Adlai Stevenson II	J. E. Brantley	280,549
Democratic Party	Adlai Stevenson II	H. Tom Cochran	280,366
Democratic Party	Adlai Stevenson II	William M. Kelly Jr.	280,159
Democratic Party	Adlai Stevenson II	Lawrence E. McNeil	279,999
Democratic Party	Adlai Stevenson II	Ben F. Ray	279,878
Democratic Party	Adlai Stevenson II	Wilma K. Butts	279,811
Democratic Party	Adlai Stevenson II	Henry H. Sweet	279,774
Democratic Party	Adlai Stevenson II	Wesley Winchell Acee Jr.	279,542
Democratic Party	Adlai Stevenson II (Note: Faithless elector W. F. Turner voted for Walter Burgwyn Jones and Herman Talmadge.)	W. F. Turner	279,484
Democratic Party	Adlai Stevenson II	H. Floyd Sherrod	279,398
Republican Party	Dwight D. Eisenhower (incumbent)	William H. Albritton	195,694
Republican Party	Dwight D. Eisenhower (incumbent)	Herman E. Dean Jr.	195,200
Republican Party	Dwight D. Eisenhower (incumbent)	Charles H. Chapman Jr.	195,175
Republican Party	Dwight D. Eisenhower (incumbent)	Robert M. Guthrie	195,012
Republican Party	Dwight D. Eisenhower (incumbent)	Neil Morgan	194,991
Republican Party	Dwight D. Eisenhower (incumbent)	W. M. Russell	194,898
Republican Party	Dwight D. Eisenhower (incumbent)	George Stiefelmeyer	194,708
Republican Party	Dwight D. Eisenhower (incumbent)	I. L. Smith Jr.	194,699
Republican Party	Dwight D. Eisenhower (incumbent)	R. S. Cartledge	194,687
Republican Party	Dwight D. Eisenhower (incumbent)	Thomas G. McNaron	194,629
Republican Party	Dwight D. Eisenhower (incumbent)	George Witcher	194,014
Independent	Unpledged	Thomas Bellsnyder Jr.	20,323
Independent	Unpledged	Russell Carter	20,279
Independent	Unpledged	Tom C. King	20,271
Independent	Unpledged	M. L. Griffin	20,210
Independent	Unpledged	Jack S. Riley	20,149
Independent	Unpledged	Edwin T. Parker	20,112
Independent	Unpledged	J. S. Payne	20,111
Independent	Unpledged	John Frederick Duggar, III	20,082
Independent	Unpledged	Joseph S. Mead	20,081
Independent	Unpledged	John C. Eagerton, III	20,027
Independent	Unpledged	Llewellyn Duggar	19,971
Write-in		Ace Carter	8
Write-in		Jim Sherrill	2
Total votes			496,871

=== Results by county ===
County	Adlai Stevenson Democratic		Dwight D. Eisenhower Republican		Unpledged electors Independent		Margin		Total votes cast
County	#	%	#	%	#	%	#	%	Total votes cast
Autauga	1,161	50.77%	857	37.47%	269	11.76%	304	13.30%	2,287
Baldwin	3,878	46.08%	4,293	51.02%	244	2.90%	-415	-4.94%	8,415
Barbour	2,530	73.35%	777	22.53%	142	4.12%	1,753	50.82%	3,449
Bibb	1,471	56.97%	1,004	38.88%	107	4.14%	467	18.09%	2,582
Blount	3,208	54.17%	2,628	44.38%	86	1.45%	580	9.79%	5,922
Bullock	812	64.86%	304	24.28%	136	10.86%	508	40.58%	1,252
Butler	1,958	55.42%	1,324	37.48%	251	7.10%	634	17.94%	3,533
Calhoun	9,069	65.24%	4,473	32.18%	358	2.58%	4,596	33.06%	13,900
Chambers	5,165	76.67%	1,448	21.49%	124	1.84%	3,717	55.18%	6,737
Cherokee	2,661	75.75%	845	24.05%	7	0.20%	1,816	51.70%	3,513
Chilton	1,891	36.73%	3,139	60.98%	118	2.29%	-1,248	-24.25%	5,148
Choctaw	1,250	70.26%	457	25.69%	72	4.05%	793	44.57%	1,779
Clarke	1,962	57.91%	1,246	36.78%	180	5.31%	716	21.13%	3,388
Clay	1,677	50.47%	1,597	48.06%	49	1.47%	80	2.41%	3,323
Cleburne	1,407	56.96%	1,056	42.75%	7	0.28%	351	14.21%	2,470
Coffee	4,163	79.02%	973	18.47%	132	2.51%	3,190	60.55%	5,268
Colbert	7,007	78.40%	1,819	20.35%	111	1.24%	5,188	58.05%	8,937
Conecuh	1,687	61.26%	885	32.14%	182	6.61%	802	29.12%	2,754
Coosa	1,411	56.01%	1,070	42.48%	38	1.51%	341	13.53%	2,519
Covington	4,887	65.25%	2,257	30.13%	346	4.62%	2,630	35.12%	7,490
Crenshaw	2,252	75.70%	567	19.06%	156	5.24%	1,685	56.64%	2,975
Cullman	5,510	55.49%	4,381	44.12%	38	0.38%	1,129	11.37%	9,929
Dale	2,318	62.45%	1,284	34.59%	110	2.96%	1,034	27.86%	3,712
Dallas	2,121	39.59%	2,324	43.37%	913	17.04%	-203	-3.78%	5,358
DeKalb	5,768	50.30%	5,684	49.56%	16	0.14%	84	0.74%	11,468
Elmore	3,353	62.16%	1,619	30.01%	422	7.82%	1,734	32.15%	5,394
Escambia	3,437	64.86%	1,529	28.85%	333	6.28%	1,908	36.01%	5,299
Etowah	12,374	62.22%	7,198	36.20%	314	1.58%	5,176	26.02%	19,886
Fayette	1,956	49.80%	1,948	49.59%	24	0.61%	8	0.21%	3,928
Franklin	3,354	49.55%	3,399	50.21%	16	0.24%	-45	-0.66%	6,769
Geneva	2,841	68.99%	1,179	28.63%	98	2.38%	1,662	40.36%	4,118
Greene	691	66.19%	309	29.60%	44	4.21%	382	36.59%	1,044
Hale	1,314	68.54%	504	26.29%	99	5.16%	810	42.25%	1,917
Henry	2,127	78.40%	429	15.81%	157	5.79%	1,698	62.59%	2,713
Houston	3,630	53.06%	2,632	38.47%	579	8.46%	998	14.59%	6,841
Jackson	4,758	71.58%	1,868	28.10%	21	0.32%	2,890	43.48%	6,647
Jefferson	38,604	44.11%	43,695	49.93%	5,214	5.96%	-5,091	-5.82%	87,513
Lamar	2,501	73.58%	867	25.51%	31	0.91%	1,634	48.07%	3,399
Lauderdale	9,150	78.26%	2,458	21.02%	84	0.72%	6,692	57.24%	11,692
Lawrence	2,961	70.75%	1,197	28.60%	27	0.65%	1,764	42.15%	4,185
Lee	3,302	65.37%	1,586	31.40%	163	3.23%	1,716	33.97%	5,051
Limestone	4,145	87.26%	589	12.40%	16	0.34%	3,556	74.86%	4,750
Lowndes	623	52.27%	326	27.35%	243	20.39%	297	24.92%	1,192
Macon	1,024	46.69%	1,067	48.65%	102	4.65%	-43	-1.96%	2,193
Madison	9,054	74.52%	2,993	24.63%	103	0.85%	6,061	49.89%	12,150
Marengo	1,858	60.88%	1,009	33.06%	185	6.06%	849	27.82%	3,052
Marion	2,849	52.67%	2,536	46.88%	24	0.44%	313	5.79%	5,409
Marshall	6,329	66.66%	3,071	32.34%	95	1.00%	3,258	34.32%	9,495
Mobile	17,163	43.41%	20,639	52.21%	1,732	4.38%	-3,476	-8.80%	39,534
Monroe	2,069	69.95%	759	25.66%	130	4.39%	1,310	44.29%	2,958
Montgomery	6,890	36.57%	8,727	46.32%	3,224	17.11%	-1,837	-9.75%	18,841
Morgan	7,671	70.56%	2,974	27.35%	227	2.09%	4,697	43.21%	10,872
Perry	974	53.75%	613	33.83%	225	12.42%	361	19.92%	1,812
Pickens	1,660	58.78%	993	35.16%	171	6.06%	667	23.62%	2,824
Pike	2,631	68.53%	997	25.97%	211	5.50%	1,634	42.56%	3,839
Randolph	3,151	66.18%	1,584	33.27%	26	0.55%	1,567	32.91%	4,761
Russell	3,060	68.32%	1,265	28.24%	154	3.44%	1,795	40.08%	4,479
Shelby	2,502	44.83%	2,901	51.98%	178	3.19%	-399	-7.15%	5,581
St. Clair	2,420	48.64%	2,441	49.07%	114	2.29%	-21	-0.43%	4,975
Sumter	981	58.71%	578	34.59%	112	6.70%	403	24.12%	1,671
Talladega	5,243	54.63%	4,197	43.73%	157	1.64%	1,046	10.90%	9,597
Tallapoosa	5,070	72.00%	1,879	26.68%	93	1.32%	3,191	45.32%	7,042
Tuscaloosa	8,186	59.33%	4,994	36.19%	618	4.48%	3,192	23.14%	13,798
Walker	7,661	59.30%	5,179	40.09%	79	0.61%	2,482	19.21%	12,919
Washington	1,705	66.37%	777	30.25%	87	3.39%	928	36.12%	2,569
Wilcox	778	52.78%	499	33.85%	197	13.36%	279	18.93%	1,474
Winston	1,570	34.35%	2,998	65.60%	2	0.04%	-1,428	-31.25%	4,570
Totals	280,844	56.52%	195,694	39.39%	20,323	4.09%	85,150	17.13%	496,871

==== Counties that flipped from Democratic to Republican ====
- Baldwin
- Franklin
- Jefferson
- Macon
- Mobile
- Montgomery
- St. Clair
- Shelby

== Analysis ==
As expected by the polls, Alabama voted for the Democratic nominees Adlai Stevenson II and running mate Tennessee Senator Estes Kefauver, with 56.52 percent of the popular vote against Republican nominees incumbent President Dwight D. Eisenhower and Vice President Richard Nixon, with 39.39 percent. Eisenhower's performance was nonetheless the second-best by a Republican in Alabama since 1884, when many blacks were still enfranchised, while Stevenson declined by eight percent compared to his 1952 performance. Eisenhower's main gains were in upper- and middle-class urban areas, where wealthier whites aligned strongly with GOP economic policies. The unpledged slate had little support and consequently did not make the impact it did in South Carolina, Mississippi or Louisiana, cracking twenty percent only in Lowndes County.

Stevenson received ten of Alabama's eleven electoral votes; the eleventh was cast by a faithless elector for Walter B. Jones.

As of the 2024 presidential election, this is the last election in which Macon County voted for a Republican nominee, and the only election since 1872 the majority-black county has voted Republican. (Note: This county also voted Republican in the Reconstruction Era elections of 1868 and 1872.) It is also the last time Houston County voted for a Democratic nominee, and the last time that the state has supported a losing Democratic nominee or that a Republican won two terms without ever carrying the state.

== See also ==
- United States presidential elections in Alabama
