= Peterman, Alabama =

Peterman, Alabama may refer to:

- Peterman, Houston County, Alabama, an unincorporated community
- Peterman, Monroe County, Alabama, a census-designated place
