= Petermann =

Petermann may refer to:

== Places ==
=== Antarctica ===
- Petermann Island
- Petermann Ranges (Antarctica)

=== Australia ===
- Petermann, Northern Territory, a locality
- Petermann Orogeny, a geological feature
- Petermann Ranges (Australia)

=== Greenland ===
- Petermann Glacier
- Petermann Peak
- Petermann Fjord

=== Elsewhere ===
- Petermann (crater), a feature on the Moon
- Kapp Petermann, a headland on the island of Spitsbergen

== People ==
- André Petermann (1922–2011), Swiss physicist
- Andreas Petermann (born 1957), German cyclist
- August Heinrich Petermann (1822–1878), German cartographer
- Daniel Petermann (born 1995), Canadian football player
- Davide Petermann (born 1994), Italian football player
- Erna Petermann (1912–?), Nazi concentration camp overseer
- Felix Petermann (born 1984), German ice hockey player
- Julius Heinrich Petermann (1801–1876), German Orientalist
- Lena Petermann (born 1994), German football player
- Mary Locke Petermann (1908–1975), American biochemist
- Philip Petermann (born 1991), Austrian football player
- Viktor Petermann (1916–2001), German air force pilot
- Xavier Petermann, Canadian actor

== See also ==
- Peterman (disambiguation)
- Peter Mann (disambiguation)
