= Ardilla, Alabama =

Unincorporated community in Alabama, United States

- Unincorporated community
- Location within Alabama Location within the United States
- Coordinates: 31°10′32″N 85°21′37″W-->
- Country: United States
- State: Alabama
- County: Houston
- Elevation: 253 ft (77 m)
- Time zone: UTC-6 (Central (CST))
  - Summer (DST): UTC-5 (CDT)
- Area code: 334
- GNIS feature ID: 113202

Ardilla is an unincorporated community in Houston County, Alabama, United States. Ardilla is located along Alabama State Route 53, 1 mile southeast of Ross Clark Circle in Dothan.

== History ==
Ardilla was named in honor of the wife of the community's first postmaster, Henry Wood. A post office operated under the name Ardilla from 1898 to 1918.

The Ardilla soil series is named for the community.

== Demographics ==
According to the returns from 1850-2010 for Alabama, it has never reported a population figure separately on the U.S. Census.
