= Grangeburg, Alabama =

Unincorporated community in Alabama, United States

- Unincorporated community
- Location within Alabama Location within the United States
- Coordinates: 31°00′29″N 85°12′42″W
- Country: United States
- State: Alabama
- County: Houston
- Elevation: 190 ft (58 m)
- Time zone: UTC-6 (Central (CST))
  - Summer (DST): UTC-5 (CDT)
- Area code: 334
- GNIS feature ID: 119230

Grangeburg, also known as Granger or Grangerburg, is an unincorporated community in Houston County, Alabama, United States. Grangeburg is located along Alabama State Route 53, 6.2 miles (10.0 km) east-southeast of Cottonwood.

== History ==
Grangeburg was originally called Granger in honor of John Granger. The name was later changed to Grangeburg. A post office operated under the name Granger from 1882 to 1908, and under the name Grangeburg from 1917 to 1925.
