= Crosby, Alabama =

Unincorporated community in Alabama, United States

- Unincorporated community
- Location within Alabama Location within the United States
- Coordinates: 31°02′20″N 85°05′11″W
- Country: United States
- State: Alabama
- County: Houston
- Elevation: 141 ft (43 m)
- Time zone: UTC-6 (Central (CST))
  - Summer (DST): UTC-5 (CDT)
- Area code: 334
- GNIS feature ID: 156230

Crosby is an unincorporated community in Houston County, Alabama, United States.

== History ==
Crosby was most likely named for John Crosby, who served as the first postmaster. A post office operated under the name Crosby from 1886 to 1934.
