= Dothan metropolitan area, Alabama =

Dothan metropolitan area
- Metropolitan Statistical Area
- Dothan, AL Metropolitan Statistical Area
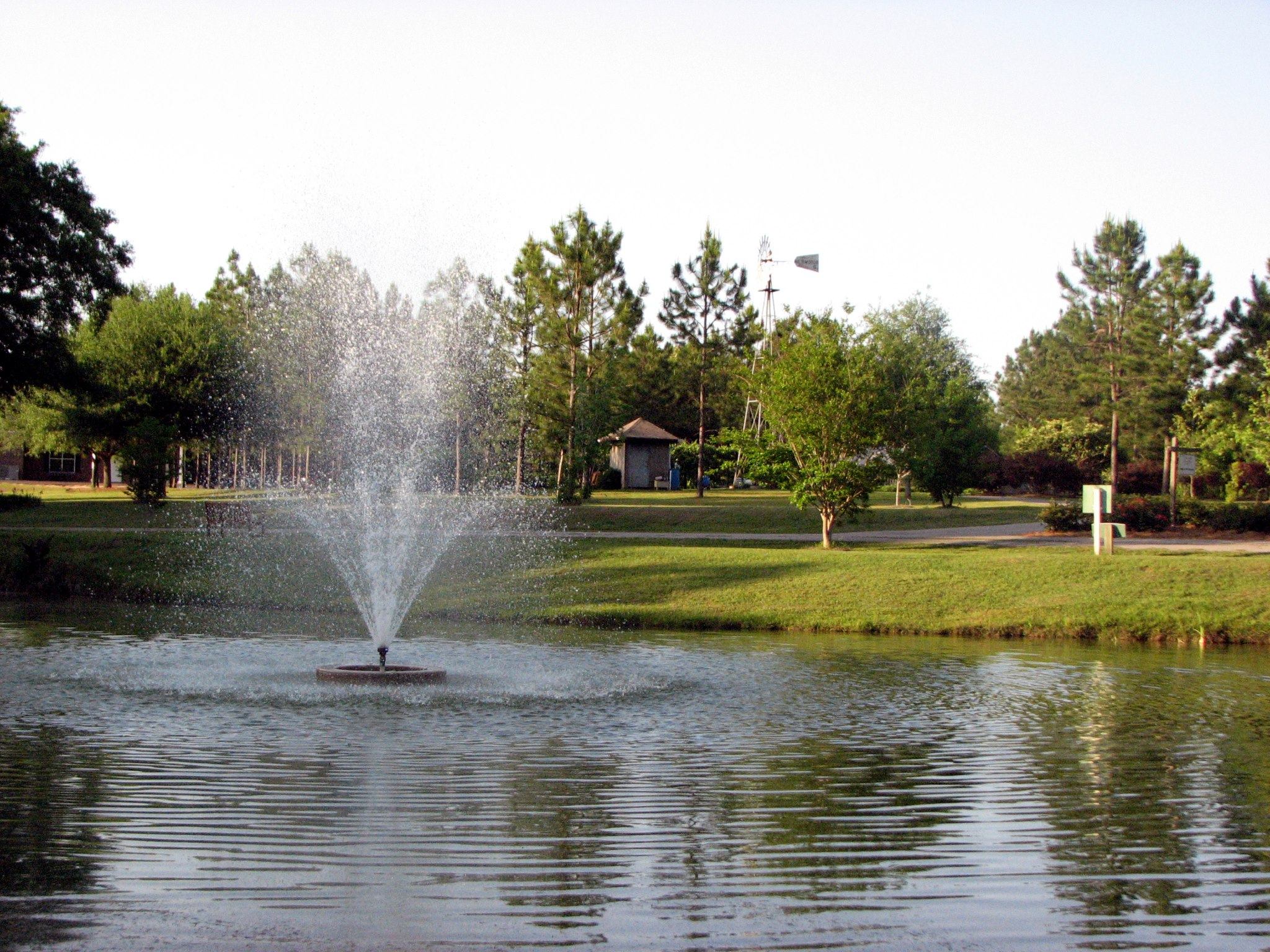
- Dothan Area Botanical Gardens
Interactive Map of Dothan–Enterprise–Ozark, AL CSA
City of Dothan
Dothan, AL MSA
City of Enterprise
Enterprise, AL µSA
City of Ozark
Ozark, AL µSA
- Country: United States
- State: Alabama
- Principal city: Dothan
- Other cities: - Enterprise; - Ozark
- Time zone: UTC-6 (CST)
  - Summer (DST): UTC-5 (CDT)

The Dothan Metropolitan Statistical Area, as defined by the United States Census Bureau, is an area consisting of Geneva, Henry, and Houston counties in southeastern Alabama, anchored by the city of Dothan, county seat of Houston County. As of the 2010 census, the MSA had a population of 145,639.

== Counties ==
- Geneva
- Henry
- Houston

== Communities ==
=== Places with more than 50,000 inhabitants ===
- Dothan (Principal city; partial)

=== Places with 2,000 to 10,000 inhabitants ===
- Abbeville
- Geneva
- Hartford
- Headland
- Samson
- Slocomb

=== Places with 1,000 to 2,000 inhabitants ===
- Ashford
- Cottonwood
- Cowarts
- Kinsey
- Malvern
- Taylor
- Webb

=== Places with fewer than 1,000 inhabitants ===
- Avon
- Black
- Coffee Springs
- Columbia
- Eunola
- Gordon
- Haleburg
- Madrid
- Newville
- Rehobeth

== Combined Statistical Area ==
The Dothan Metropolitan Statistical Area is a significant part of the Dothan-Enterprise-Ozark Combined Statistical Area, which is composed of the Dothan metropolitan area, the Enterprise micropolitan area, and the Ozark micropolitan area. As of the 2010 census, the CSA had a population of 245,838.

== See also ==
- Alabama census statistical areas
