= Black, Alabama =

- Town
- Location of Black in Geneva County, Alabama.
- Coordinates: 31°00′36″N 85°44′39″W
- Country: United States
- State: Alabama
- County: Geneva

Government
  - Mayor: Lisa Brown

Area
  - Total: 4.06 sq mi (10.52 km^{2})
  - Land: 4.05 sq mi (10.50 km^{2})
  - Water: 0.0077 sq mi (0.02 km^{2})
- Elevation: 233 ft (71 m)

Population (2020)
  - Total: 221
  - Density: 54.5/sq mi (21.05/km^{2})
- Time zone: UTC-6 (Central (CST))
  - Summer (DST): UTC-5 (CDT)
- ZIP code: 36314
- Area code: 334
- FIPS code: 01-07120
- GNIS feature ID: 2405270

Black is a town in Geneva County, Alabama, United States. Incorporated in 1905, it is part of the Dothan, Alabama Metropolitan Statistical Area. At the 2020 census, the population was 221, an increase over the figure of 207 tabulated in 2010. The town was named after George W. Black, who was an early settler within the area around the town.

== Geography ==
According to the U.S. Census Bureau, the town has a total area of 3.1 square miles (8.0 km^{2}), all land.

== Demographics ==
Historical population
Census	Pop.	Note	%±
1910	485		—
1920	614		26.6%
1930	335		−45.4%
1940	348		3.9%
1950	239		−31.3%
1960	133		−44.4%
1970	171		28.6%
1980	156		−8.8%
1990	174		11.5%
2000	202		16.1%
2010	207		2.5%
2020	221		6.8%
U.S. Decennial Census; 2013 Estimate

As of the census of 2000, there were 202 people, 85 households, and 57 families residing in the town. The population density was 65.6 inhabitants per square mile (25.3/km^{2}). There were 102 housing units at an average density of 33.1 per square mile (12.8/km^{2}). The racial makeup of the town was 94.06% Caucasian, 5.45% African American, and 0.50% Native American.

There were 85 households, out of which 29.4% had children under the age of 18 living with them, 52.9% were married couples living together, 9.4% had a female householder with no husband present, and 31.8% were non-families. 28.2% of all households were made up of individuals, and 16.5% had someone living alone who was 65 years of age or older. The average household size was 2.38 and the average family size was 2.93.

In the town, the population was spread out, with 23.8% under the age of 18, 11.4% from 18 to 24, 24.8% from 25 to 44, 22.3% from 45 to 64, and 17.8% who were 65 years of age or older. The median age was 39 years. For every 100 females, there were 72.6 males. For every 100 females age 18 and over, there were 79.1 males.

The median income for a household in the town was $31,250, and the median income for a family was $36,250. Males had a median income of $27,857 versus $15,924 for females. The per capita income for the town was $12,628. About 13.2% of families and 19.2% of the population were below the poverty line, including 32.4% of those under the age of eighteen and 8.0% of those 65 or over.
