= J. Peterman =

J. Peterman may refer to:

- John Peterman, operator of the J. Peterman Company
- The J. Peterman Company, an apparel company
- Jacopo Peterman, a fictional version of John Peterman, portrayed by John O'Hurley on the television sitcom Seinfeld

== See also ==
- Peterman (disambiguation)
