= Kinsey, Alabama =

Town in the United States

- Town
- Location of Kinsey in Houston County, Alabama.
- Coordinates: 31°17′33″N 85°20′07″W
- Country: United States
- State: Alabama
- County: Houston

Area
  - Total: 12.12 sq mi (31.40 km^{2})
  - Land: 12.11 sq mi (31.37 km^{2})
  - Water: 0.012 sq mi (0.03 km^{2})
- Elevation: 341 ft (104 m)

Population (2020)
  - Total: 2,203
  - Density: 181.9/sq mi (70.23/km^{2})
- Time zone: UTC-6 (Central (CST))
  - Summer (DST): UTC-5 (CDT)
- ZIP code: 36303
- Area code: 334
- FIPS code: 01-40072
- GNIS feature ID: 2405953
- Website: kinseyalabama.com

Kinsey is a town in Houston County, Alabama, United States. It was initially located and incorporated in Henry County in February 1893. In 1903, it was redrawn into newly created Houston County and was later reincorporated in August 1957. It is part of the Dothan, Alabama Metropolitan Statistical Area. As of the 2020 census, Kinsey had a population of 2,203.

== History ==
Kinsey was named for an early postmaster, Eliza Kinsey.

== Geography ==
Kinsey is located in northern Houston County. It is bordered to the south and west by the city of Dothan, to the southeast by the town of Webb, and to the north by the city of Headland in Henry County.

U.S. Route 431 passes through the western part of Kinsey, leading north 21 miles (34 km) to Abbeville and southwest 7 miles (11 km) to Dothan.

According to the U.S. Census Bureau, Kinsey has a total area of 12.1 square miles (31.3 km^{2}), all land.

== Demographics ==
Historical population
Census	Pop.	Note	%±
1900	342		—
1910	340		−0.6%
1960	283		—
1970	219		−22.6%
1980	1,239		465.8%
1990	1,679		35.5%
2000	1,796		7.0%
2010	2,198		22.4%
2020	2,203		0.2%
U.S. Decennial Census; 2013 Estimate

=== 2020 census ===
As of the 2020 census, Kinsey had a population of 2,203. The median age was 35.4 years. 27.6% of residents were under the age of 18 and 12.8% were 65 years of age or older. For every 100 females, there were 89.1 males, and for every 100 females age 18 and over, there were 83.2 males.

0.0% of residents lived in urban areas, while 100.0% lived in rural areas.

There were 842 households, including 519 family households. Of all households, 38.1% had children under the age of 18 living in them, 44.5% were married-couple households, 18.5% were households with a male householder and no spouse or partner present, and 31.0% were households with a female householder and no spouse or partner present. About 24.3% of all households were made up of individuals, and 8.9% had someone living alone who was 65 years of age or older.

There were 941 housing units, of which 10.5% were vacant. The homeowner vacancy rate was 0.9% and the rental vacancy rate was 13.7%.

Kinsey racial composition
Race	Num.	Perc.
White (non-Hispanic)	988	44.85%
Black or African American (non-Hispanic)	1,024	46.48%
Native American	2	0.09%
Asian	8	0.36%
Other/Mixed	72	3.27%
Hispanic or Latino	109	4.95%

=== 2010 census ===
At the 2010 census there were 2,198 people in 810 households, including 598 families, in the town. The population density was 181.7 inhabitants per square mile (70.2/km^{2}). There were 899 housing units at an average density of 74.3 per square mile (28.7/km^{2}). The racial makeup of the town was 49.9% White, 46.0% Black or African American, 0.1% Asian, 0.0% Pacific Islander, 2.1% from other races, and 1.5% from two or more races. 4.0% of the population were Hispanic or Latino of any race. Of the 810 households 37.5% had children under the age of 18 living with them, 46.8% were married couples living together, 21.7% had a female householder with no husband present, and 26.2% were non-families. 22.8% of households were one person and 6.0% were one person aged 65 or older. The average household size was 2.71 and the average family size was 3.18.

The age distribution was 30.2% under the age of 18, 9.1% from 18 to 24, 28.5% from 25 to 44, 22.6% from 45 to 64, and 9.7% 65 or older. The median age was 32.4 years. For every 100 females, there were 95.0 males. For every 100 females age 18 and over, there were 89.4 males.

The median household income was $33,516 and the median family income was $34,643. Males had a median income of $29,429 versus $22,339 for females. The per capita income for the town was $17,145. About 20.3% of families and 23.3% of the population were below the poverty line, including 40.2% of those under age 18 and 10.7% of those age 65 or over.

=== 2000 census ===
At the 2000 census there were 1,796 people in 687 households, including 509 families, in the town. The population density was 148.4 inhabitants per square mile (57.3/km^{2}). There were 768 housing units at an average density of 63.5 per square mile (24.5/km^{2}). The racial makeup of the town was 58.07% White, 40.48% Black or African American, 0.33% Asian, 0.06% Pacific Islander, 0.56% from other races, and 0.50% from two or more races. 1.22% of the population were Hispanic or Latino of any race. Of the 687 households 42.6% had children under the age of 18 living with them, 50.8% were married couples living together, 19.4% had a female householder with no husband present, and 25.8% were non-families. 22.9% of households were one person and 7.4% were one person aged 65 or older. The average household size was 2.61 and the average family size was 3.07.

The age distribution was 32.2% under the age of 18, 8.6% from 18 to 24, 32.3% from 25 to 44, 18.0% from 45 to 64, and 8.8% 65 or older. The median age was 31 years. For every 100 females, there were 86.9 males. For every 100 females age 18 and over, there were 83.3 males.

The median household income was $27,578 and the median family income was $33,950. Males had a median income of $25,669 versus $20,227 for females. The per capita income for the town was $14,196. About 20.3% of families and 21.3% of the population were below the poverty line, including 29.0% of those under age 18 and 17.8% of those age 65 or over.
