= 1956 United States presidential election =

Re-election of Dwight D. Eisenhower

- November 6, 1956

531 members of the Electoral College 266 electoral votes needed to win
- Turnout: 60.2% (▼3.1 pp)

Nominee	Dwight D. Eisenhower	Adlai Stevenson II
Party	Republican	Democratic
Home state	Pennsylvania (Note: Although he grew up in Kansas before his military career, at the time of the 1952 election Eisenhower was president of Columbia University and was, officially, a resident of New York. During his first term as president, he moved his private residence to Gettysburg, Pennsylvania, and officially changed his residency to Pennsylvania.)	Illinois
Running mate	Richard Nixon	Estes Kefauver
Electoral vote	457	73 (Note: In state-by-state tallies, Stevenson earned 74 pledged electors, but he lost one vote in Alabama to W. F. Turner, who voted for Jones & Talmadge, despite Stevenson carrying the state.)
States carried	41	7
Popular vote	35,579,180	26,028,028
Percentage	57.4%	42.0%
- Presidential election results map. Red denotes states won by Eisenhower/Nixon, blue denotes those won by Stevenson/Kefauver, and orange indicates an Alabama faithless elector who cast an electoral vote for Jones/Talmadge. Numbers indicate the number of electoral votes allotted to each state.
President before election
Dwight D. Eisenhower
Republican
Elected President
Dwight D. Eisenhower
Republican

A presidential election was held in the United States on November 6, 1956. Incumbent Republican President Dwight D. Eisenhower and his running mate, incumbent Vice President Richard Nixon, were re-elected to a second term in a landslide victory, defeating Democrat Adlai Stevenson II, former Illinois governor and Senator Estes Kefauver, in a rematch of 1952.

Eisenhower, who first became famous for his military leadership in World War II, remained widely popular. A heart attack in 1955 provoked speculation that he would not seek a second term, but his health recovered and he faced no opposition at the 1956 Republican National Convention. Stevenson remained popular with a core of liberal Democrats, but held no office and had no real base. He defeated New York Governor W. Averell Harriman and several other candidates on the first presidential ballot of the 1956 Democratic National Convention. Stevenson called for a significant increase in government spending on social programs and a decrease in military spending.

With the end of the Korean War and a strong economy, Eisenhower was the heavy favorite to win re-election. Supporters of the president focused on his "personal qualities ... his sincerity, his integrity and sense of duty, his virtue as a family man, his religious devotion, and his sheer likeableness", rather than on his leadership record. The weeks before the election saw two major international crises in the Middle East and Eastern Europe, and Eisenhower's handling of the crises boosted his popularity.

Eisenhower slightly improved on his 1952 majorities in both the popular and electoral vote. He increased his 1952 gains among Democrats, especially Northern and Midwestern white ethnic groups and city-dwelling and suburban White Southerners. Surprisingly, Eisenhower narrowly lost Missouri, a bellwether state for most of the 20th century, and which had voted for him in 1952; at the same time he carried Kentucky, Louisiana, and West Virginia, which had voted against him in the previous election. Eisenhower was the first Republican presidential candidate to win Louisiana, or any Deep South state for that matter, since 1876.

This was the sixth and most recent rematch of an American presidential election, and the second time (after 1900) that the incumbent won a rematch. This was the last election before term limits established by the Twenty-second Amendment to the United States Constitution, which first applied to Eisenhower, became effective. This was the last presidential election before the admissions of Alaska and Hawaii in 1959, as well as the final presidential election in which the major party candidates were not both born in the 20th century. Eisenhower's victory was the first for an incumbent Republican president since 1924, and he became the first Republican to serve two full terms since Ulysses S. Grant in 1869–1877. (Note: Theodore Roosevelt and Calvin Coolidge were elected for their second term in 1904 and 1924, respectively, but for their first full term since their first term were partial. William McKinley was elected for a second full term in 1900 but was assassinated six months into it.) In contrast, Stevenson became the last major party presidential candidate to be unsuccessful in more than one election.

== Republican Party ==
Republican Party (United States) 1956 Republican Party ticket
Dwight D. Eisenhower	Richard Nixon
for President	for Vice President
34th President of the United States (1953–1961)	36th Vice President of the United States (1953–1961)
Campaign

=== Republican candidates ===
President of the United States
Dwight D. Eisenhower
from Pennsylvania
(1953–1961)

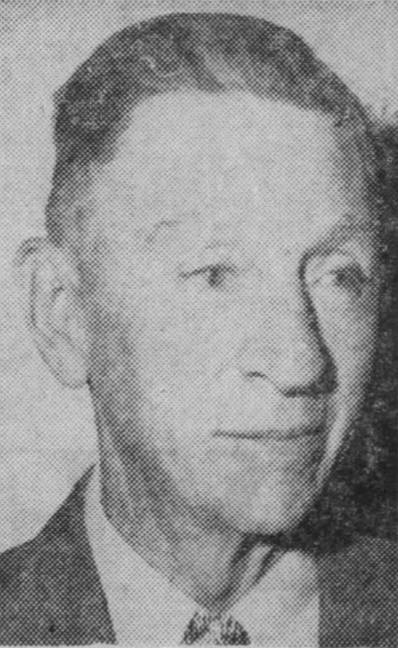
Montana Secretary of State
S. C. Arnold
from Montana
(1955–1957)

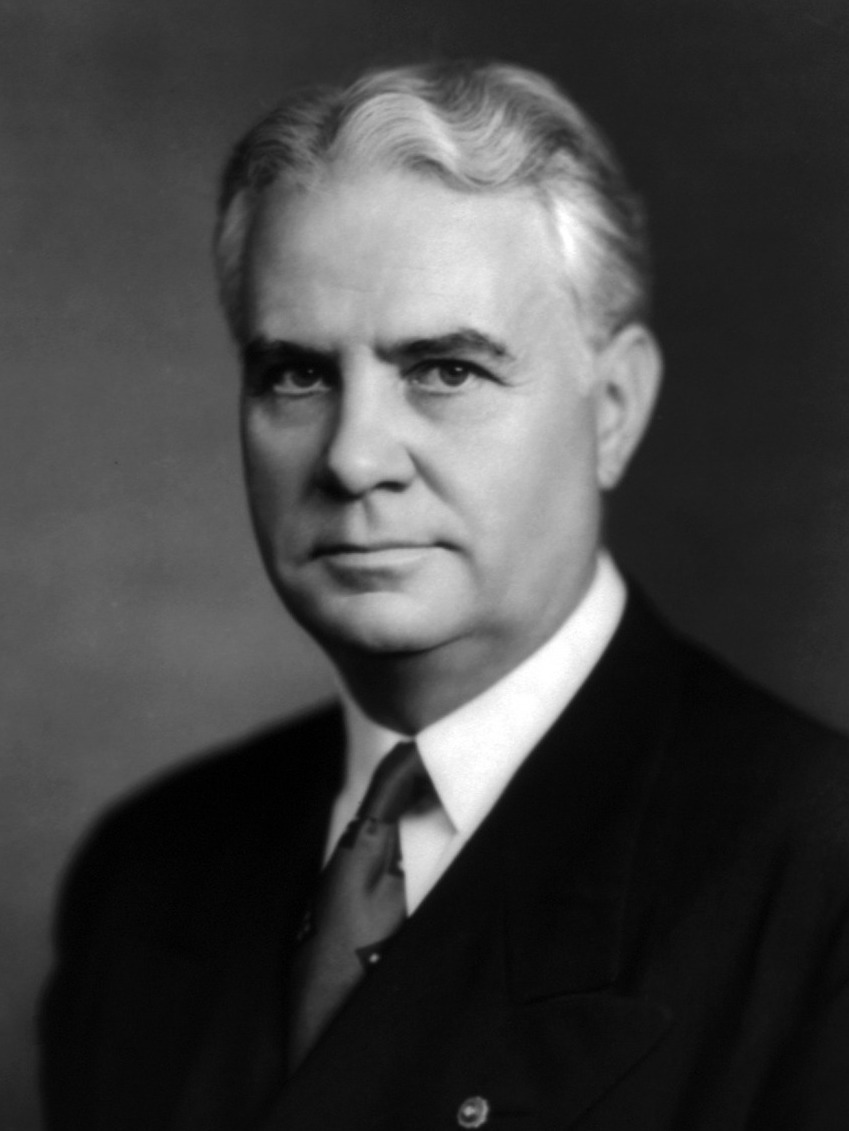
Senator
John W. Bricker
from Ohio
(1947–1959)

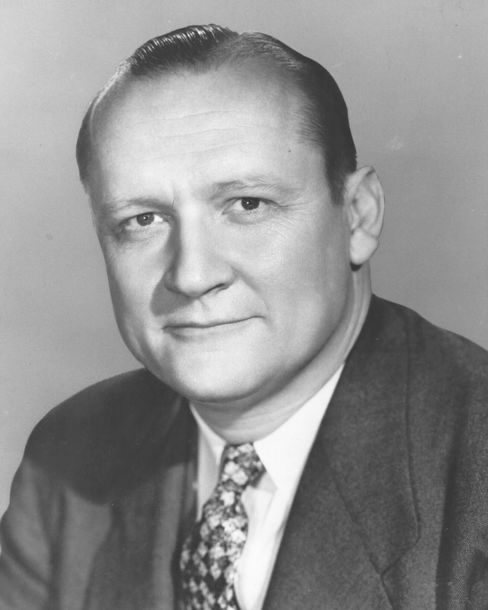
Senator
William Knowland
from California
(1945–1959)

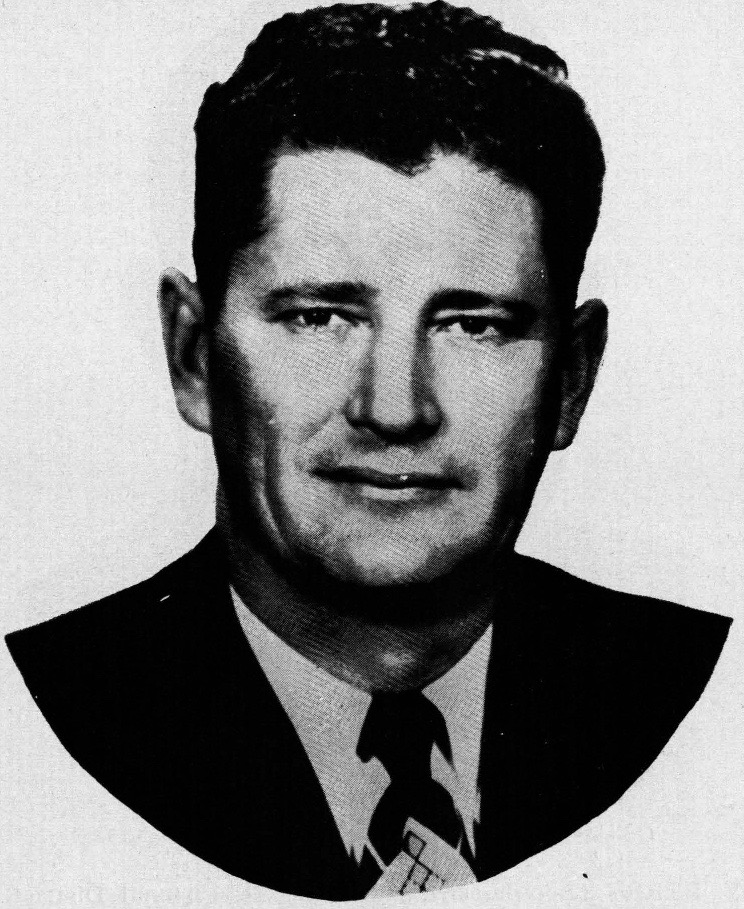
Governor
Joe Foss
from South Dakota
(1955–1959)

Early in 1956, there was speculation that President Eisenhower would not run for a second term because of concerns about his health. In 1955, Eisenhower had suffered a serious heart attack. However, he soon recovered and decided to run for a second term. (In June 1956 he also underwent surgery for ileitis.) Given Eisenhower's enormous popularity, he was renominated with no opposition at the 1956 Republican National Convention in San Francisco.

According to Steven Ambrose, Nixon was anguished that Eisenhower never liked him and had repeatedly delayed saying Nixon should be renominated for vice president. Ambrose also stated that Eisenhower favored Robert B. Anderson, a former Democrat who had served as United States Secretary of the Navy and United States Deputy Secretary of Defense, but Anderson declined to be considered. With Eisenhower worried about his health, he decided that Nixon had his shortcomings, but was better prepared to assume the presidency than any possible alternative. In Ambrose's view, "In itself, that was the highest possible tribute he could pay Nixon." Harold Stassen was the only Republican to publicly oppose Nixon's re-nomination for vice president, and Nixon remained highly popular among the Republican rank-and-file voters. Nixon had worked hard to reshape the vice presidency. It became his platform to campaign for Republican state and local candidates across the country, and these candidates came to his defense. In the spring of 1956, Eisenhower publicly announced that Nixon would again be his running mate, and Stassen was forced to second Nixon's nomination at the Republican Convention. Unlike 1952, conservative Republicans (who had supported Robert A. Taft against Eisenhower in 1952) did not attempt to shape the platform. At the convention, Nebraska delegate Terry McGovern Carpenter voted for a fictitious "Joe Smith" for vice president to prevent a unanimous vote.

== Democratic Party ==
Democratic Party (United States) 1956 Democratic Party ticket
Adlai Stevenson	Estes Kefauver
for President	for Vice President
31st Governor of Illinois (1949–1953)	U.S. Senator from Tennessee (1949–1963)
Campaign

=== Democratic candidates ===
Former Governor
Adlai Stevenson II
from Illinois
(1949–1953)

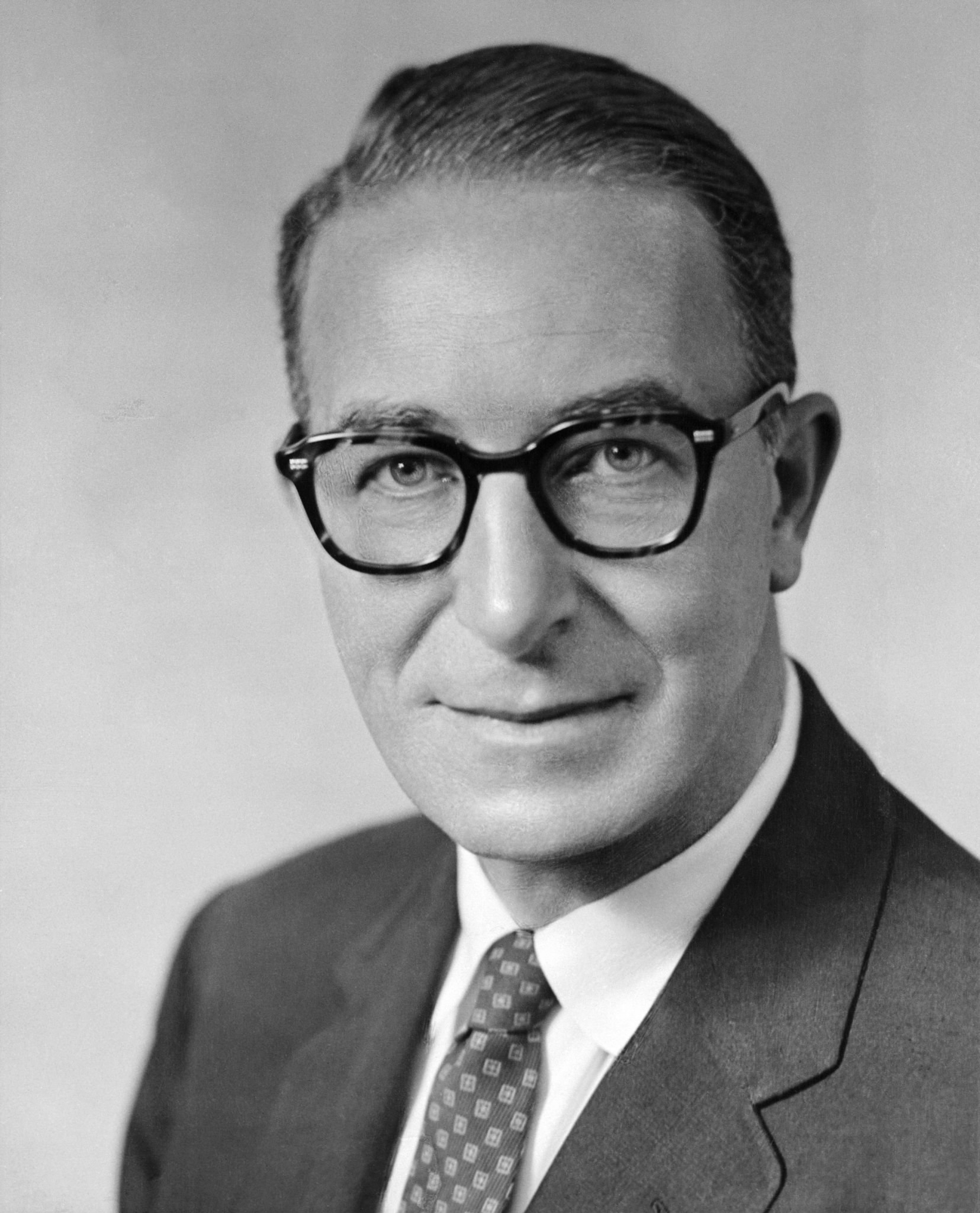
Senator
Estes Kefauver
from Tennessee
(1949–1963)

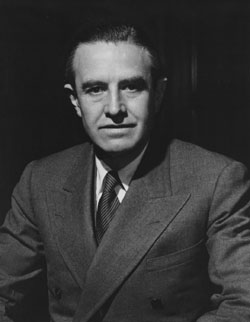
Governor
W. Averell Harriman
from New York
(1955–1958)

=== Primaries ===
Results of the 1956 Democratic presidential primaries.

Adlai Stevenson, the Democratic Party's 1952 nominee, fought a tight primary battle with populist Tennessee Senator Estes Kefauver for the 1956 nomination. Kefauver won the New Hampshire primary unopposed (though Stevenson won 15% on write-ins). After Kefauver upset Stevenson in the Minnesota primary, Stevenson, realizing that he was in trouble, agreed to debate Kefauver in Florida. Stevenson and Kefauver held the first televised presidential debate on May 21, 1956, before the Florida primary. Stevenson carried Florida by a 52–48% margin. By the time of the California primary in June 1956, Kefauver's campaign had run low on money and could not compete for publicity and advertising with the well-funded Stevenson. Stevenson won the California primary by a 63–37% margin, and Kefauver soon withdrew from the race.

==== Popular vote results ====
- Adlai Stevenson - 3,051,347 (52.3%)
- Estes Kefauver - 2,278,636 (39.1%)
- Frank Lausche - 276,923 (4.7%)
- Unpledged - 171,198 (2.9%)
- John William McCormack - 26,128 (0.4%)
- Others - 28,360 (0.6%)

=== Democratic National Convention ===
At the 1956 Democratic National Convention in Chicago, New York Governor W. Averell Harriman, who was backed by former President Harry S. Truman, challenged Stevenson for the nomination. However, Stevenson's delegate lead was much too large for Harriman to overcome, and Stevenson won on the first ballot.

The roll call, as reported in Richard C. Bain and Judith H. Parris, Convention Decisions and Voting Records, pp. 294–298:

Presidential balloting, DNC 1956
Contender	Vote
Adlai Stevenson	905.5
W. Averell Harriman	210
Lyndon B. Johnson	80
Stuart Symington	45.5
Happy Chandler	36.5
James C. Davis	33
John S. Battle	32.5
George Bell Timmerman Jr.	23.5
Frank Lausche	5.5

=== Vice-presidential nomination ===
Candidate	Current position
Estes Kefauver	U.S. Senator from Tennessee
John F. Kennedy	U.S. Senator from Massachusetts
Albert Gore Sr.	U.S. Senator from Tennessee
Robert F. Wagner Jr.	Mayor of New York City
Hubert Humphrey	U.S. Senator from Minnesota

The highlight of the 1956 Democratic Convention came when Stevenson, to create excitement for the ticket, made the surprise announcement that the convention's delegates would choose his running mate. This set off a desperate scramble among several candidates to win the nomination. Potential vice presidential candidates had only one hectic day to campaign among the delegates before the voting began. The two leading contenders were Senator Kefauver, who retained the support of his primary delegates, and Senator John F. Kennedy from Massachusetts, who was not well known at the time. Although Stevenson privately preferred Senator Kennedy to be his running mate, he did not attempt to influence the balloting for Kennedy in any way. Kennedy surprised the experts by surging into the lead on the second ballot; at one point, he was only 15 votes shy of winning. However, a number of states then left their "favorite son" candidates and switched to Kefauver, giving him the victory. Kennedy then gave a gracious concession speech. The defeat was a boost for Kennedy's long-term presidential chances: as a serious contender, he gained favorable national publicity, yet by losing to Kefauver he avoided blame for Stevenson's loss to Eisenhower in November. The vote totals in the vice presidential balloting are recorded in the following table, which also comes from Bain & Parris.

Vice Presidential balloting, DNC 1956
Ballot	1	2 before shifts	2 after shifts
Estes Kefauver	466.5	551.5	755.5
John F. Kennedy	294.5	618	589
Albert Gore Sr.	178	110.5	13.5
Robert F. Wagner Jr.	162.5	9.5	6
Hubert Humphrey	134	74.5	2
Luther H. Hodges	40	0.5	0
P.T. Maner	33	0	0
LeRoy Collins	29	0	0
Clinton Presba Anderson	16	0	0
Frank G. Clement	14	0	0
Pat Brown	1	0	0
Lyndon B. Johnson	1	0	0
Stuart Symington	1	0	0

== General election ==
=== Polling ===
Poll source	Date(s) administered	Dwight Eisenhower (R)	Adlai Stevenson (D)	Other	Undecided	Margin
Election Results	November 6, 1956	57.37%	41.97%	0.66%	-	15.40
Gallup	Oct. 30-Nov. 2, 1956	57%	39%	1%	3%	18
Roper	October 28, 1956 (Note: The publication date is used, as the dates of the survey were not given in the source)	52%	43%	-	5%	9
Gallup	October 7-12, 1956	51%	41%	-	8%	10
Gallup	September 20-25, 1956	52%	40%	-	8%	12
Roper	September 16, 1956	48%	41%	-	11%	7
Gallup	September 9-14, 1956	52%	41%	-	7%	11
Gallup	August 23-28, 1956	52%	41%	-	7%	11
August 20–23: Republican National Convention
August 13–17: Democratic National Convention
Gallup	July 12-17, 1956	61%	37%	-	2%	24
Gallup	April 19-24, 1956	62%	36%	-	3%	26
Gallup	Mar. 29-Apr. 3, 1956	61%	37%	-	2%	24
Gallup	March 8-13, 1956	61%	37%	-	2%	24
Gallup	February 16-21, 1956	63%	33%	-	4%	30
Gallup	January 6-11, 1956	56%	40%	-	4%	16
Gallup	November 17-22, 1955	58%	39%	-	3%	19
Gallup	August 25-30, 1955	59%	37%	-	4%	22
Gallup	May 12-17, 1955	55%	39%	-	6%	16
Gallup	January 20-25, 1955	57%	40%	-	3%	17
Gallup	September 5-10, 1954	53%	47%	-	(Note: Only Eisenhower and Stevenson voters were accounted in the source, not Undecided.)	6
Gallup	March 19-24, 1954	45%	37%	-	18%	8

=== Campaign ===
Stevenson campaigned hard against Eisenhower, with television ads for the first time being the dominant medium for both sides. Eisenhower's 1952 election victory had been due in large part to winning the female vote; hence, during this campaign there was a plethora of "housewife"-focused ads. Some commentators at the time also argued that television's new prominence was a major factor in Eisenhower's decision to run for a second term at the age of 66, considering his weak health after the heart attack in 1955. Television allowed Eisenhower to reach people across the country without enduring the strain of repeated coast-to-coast travel, making a national campaign more feasible.

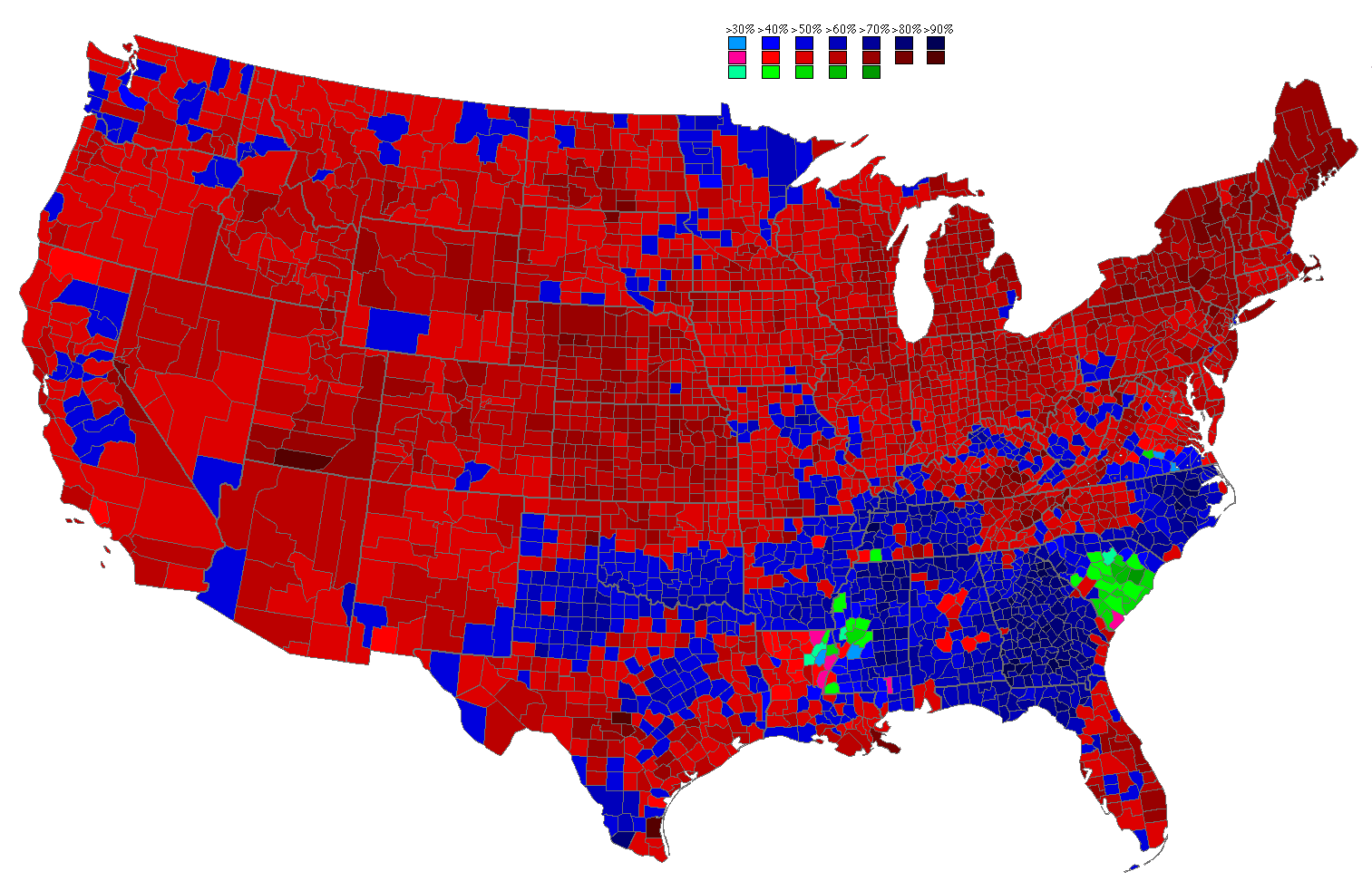
Results by county explicitly indicating the percentage for the winning candidate. Shades of red are for Eisenhower (Republican), shades of blue are for Stevenson (Democratic), and shades of green are for Unpledged Electors/Andrews (Independent/States' Rights).

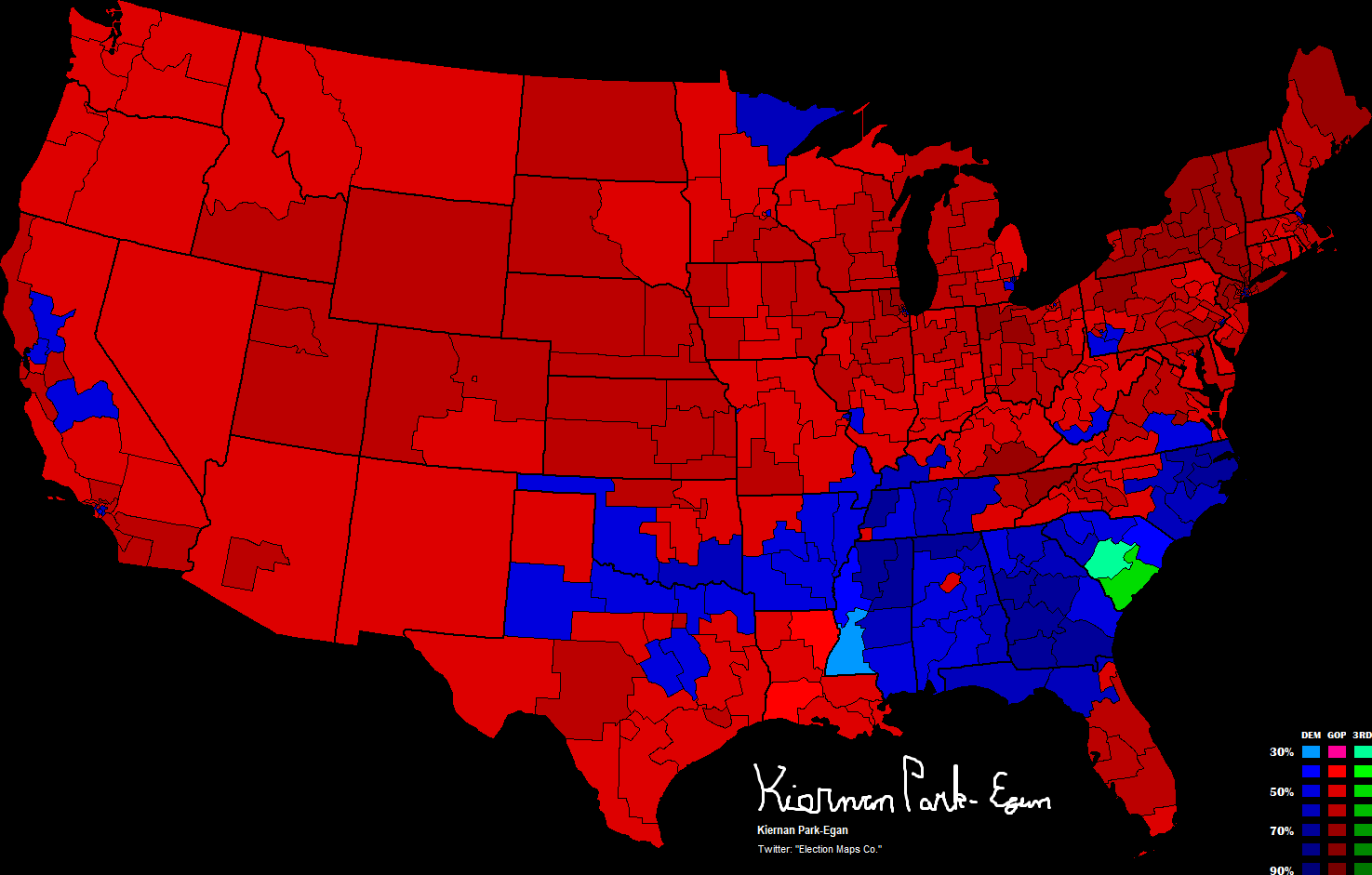
Results by congressional districts explicitly indicating the percentage for the winning candidate. Shades of red are for Eisenhower (Republican), shades of blue are for Stevenson (Democratic), and shades of green are for Unpledged Electors/Andrews (Independent/States' Rights).

Stevenson proposed significant increases in government spending for social programs and treaties with the Soviet Union to lower military spending and end nuclear testing on both sides. He also proposed to end the military draft and switch to an "all-volunteer" military. Eisenhower publicly opposed these ideas, even though in private he was working on a proposal to ban atmospheric nuclear testing. Eisenhower had retained the enormous personal and political popularity he had earned during World War II, and he maintained a comfortable lead in the polls throughout the campaign.

Eisenhower was also helped by his handling of two developing foreign-policy crises that occurred in the weeks before the election. In the Soviet-occupied People's Republic of Hungary, many citizens had risen in revolt in the Revolution of 1956 against Soviet domination, but the Soviets responded by invading the country on October 26. Three days later, a combined force of Israeli, British, and French troops invaded Egypt to topple Gamal Abdel Nasser and seize the recently nationalized Suez Canal. The resolution of the latter crisis rapidly moved to the United Nations, and the Hungarian revolt was brutally crushed within a few days by re-deployed Soviet troops. Eisenhower condemned both actions, but was unable to help Hungary; he did, however, forcefully pressure the western forces to withdraw from Egypt.

While these two events led many Americans to rally in support of the president and swelled his expected margin of victory, the campaign was seen differently by some foreign governments. The Eisenhower administration had also supported the Brown v. Board of Education ruling in 1954; this ruling by the U.S. Supreme Court ended legal segregation in public schools. Meanwhile, Stevenson voiced disapproval about federal court intervention in segregation, saying about Brown that "we don't need reforms or groping experiments." This was an about-face from the national Democratic party platform's endorsement of civil rights in the 1948 campaign. Although Eisenhower "avoid[ed] a clear stand on the Brown decision" during the campaign, in the contest with Stevenson, he won the support of nearly 40% of black voters; he was the last Republican presidential candidate to receive such a level of support from black voters.

=== Results ===
Eisenhower led all opinion polls by large margins throughout the campaign. On Election Day Eisenhower took over 57% of the popular vote and won 41 of the 48 states. Stevenson won only six Southern states and the border state of Missouri, becoming the first losing candidate since William Jennings Bryan in 1900 to carry Missouri. Eisenhower carried Louisiana, making him the first Republican presidential candidate to carry the state, or any state in the Deep South for that matter, since Rutherford Hayes had done so in 1876 during Reconstruction. Eisenhower also became the first Republican to win two presidential terms since William McKinley in 1900.

Eisenhower, who had won in twenty-one of the thirty-nine cities with a population above 250,000 in the 1952 election, won in twenty-eight of those cities in the 1956 election. He had won six of the eight largest cities in the Southern United States in the 1952 election and won seven of them with Atlanta being the only one to remain Democratic.

Of the 3,101 counties/independent cities making returns, Eisenhower won the most popular votes in 2,143 (69.11%) while Stevenson carried 924 (29.80%). Unpledged Electors prevailed in 32 counties (1.03%) while Andrews carried two counties (0.06%).

This election was the last in which Massachusetts voted Republican until 1980 and the last in which Connecticut, Maryland, Michigan, Minnesota, New York, Pennsylvania, Rhode Island, Texas, and West Virginia did so until 1972. Conversely this was the last election in which Mississippi voted Democratic until 1976, and is also the last election until 1976 when Alabama gave a majority of its electoral votes to the Democratic candidate. As of 2023, this remains the last time that Missouri, Arkansas, Mississippi, Alabama, South Carolina, and North Carolina would back a losing Democratic presidential candidate. This was the last election in which Massachusetts and Minnesota simultaneously voted Republican.

In 9 Southern states, a slate of third party options emerged as a protest to the civil rights movement. This was a continuation of the former Dixiecrat party from 1948. The states of Tennessee, Arkansas, Texas, and Virginia went a step farther, nominating Thomas Andrews for president, meanwhile in Kentucky they nominated senator Harry Byrd for president. The remaining states of Mississippi, South Carolina, Alabama, and Louisiana, left their electors as "Unpledged".

Electoral results
Presidential candidate	Party	Home state	Popular vote		Electoral vote	Running mate		
Presidential candidate	Party	Home state	Count	Percentage	Electoral vote	Vice-presidential candidate	Home state	Electoral vote
Dwight D. Eisenhower (incumbent)	Republican	Pennsylvania	35,579,180	57.37%	457	Richard Nixon (incumbent)	California	457
Adlai Stevenson II	Democratic	Illinois	26,028,028	41.97%	73	Estes Kefauver	Tennessee	73
Walter Burgwyn Jones	Democratic	Alabama	—^{(a)}	—^{(a)}	1	Herman Talmadge	Georgia	1
(Unpledged electors)	(n/a)	(n/a)	196,318	0.32%	0	(n/a)	(n/a)	0
T. Coleman Andrews	States' Rights	Virginia	108,956	0.18%	0	Thomas H. Werdel	California	0
Eric Hass	Socialist Labor	New York	44,450	0.07%	0	Georgia Cozzini	Wisconsin	0
Enoch A. Holtwick	Prohibition	Illinois	41,937	0.07%	0	Edwin M. Cooper	California	0
Farrell Dobbs	Socialist Workers	New York	7,797	0.01%	0	Myra Tanner Weiss	California	0
Harry F. Byrd	States' Rights	Virginia	2,657	<0.01%	0	William E. Jenner	Indiana	0
Darlington Hoopes	Socialist	Pennsylvania	2,128	<0.01%	0	Samuel H. Friedman	New York	0
Henry B. Krajewski	American Third	New Jersey	1,829	<0.01%	0	Anna Yezo	New Jersey	0
Gerald L. K. Smith	Christian Nationalist	Michigan	8	<0.01%	0	Charles Robertson	Michigan	0
Other			8,691	0.01%	—	Other		—
Total			62,021,979	100%	531			531
Needed to win					266			266

Source (Popular Vote): Leip, David. "1956 Presidential Election Results". Dave Leip's Atlas of U.S. Presidential Elections.Source (Electoral Vote): "Electoral College Box Scores 1789–1996". National Archives and Records Administration.

Popular vote
Eisenhower	57.37%
Stevenson	41.97%
Unpledged	0.32%
Others	0.34%

Electoral vote
Eisenhower	86.06%
Stevenson	13.75%
Jones	0.19%

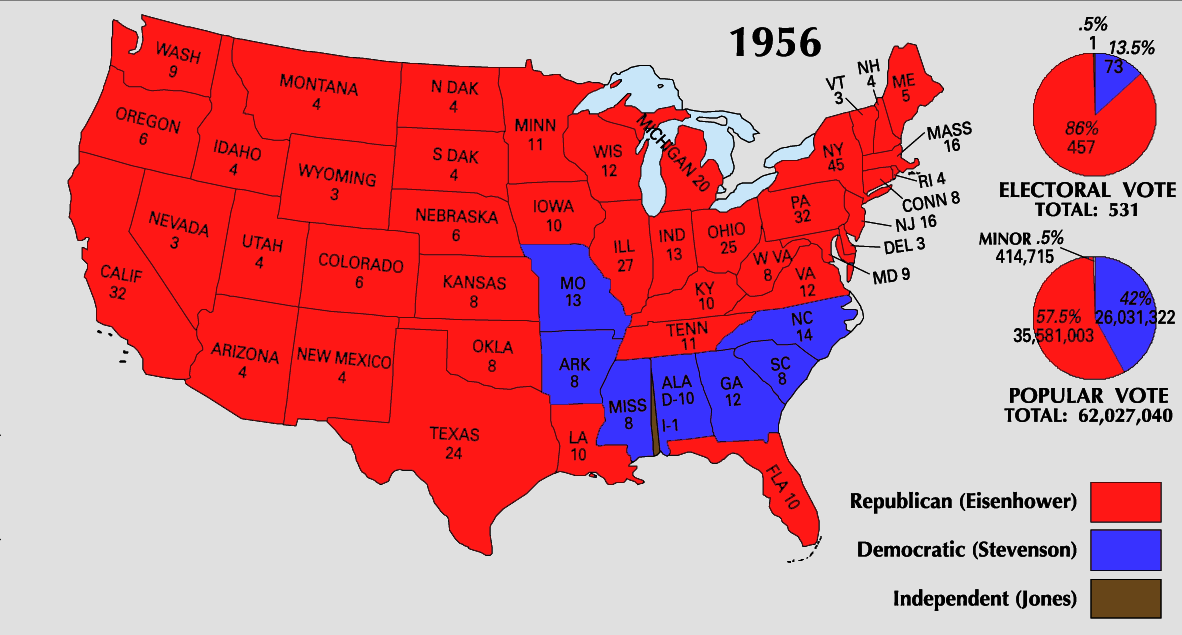

Results by county, shaded according to winning candidate's percentage of the vote

Results by districts, shaded according to winning candidate's percentage of the vote

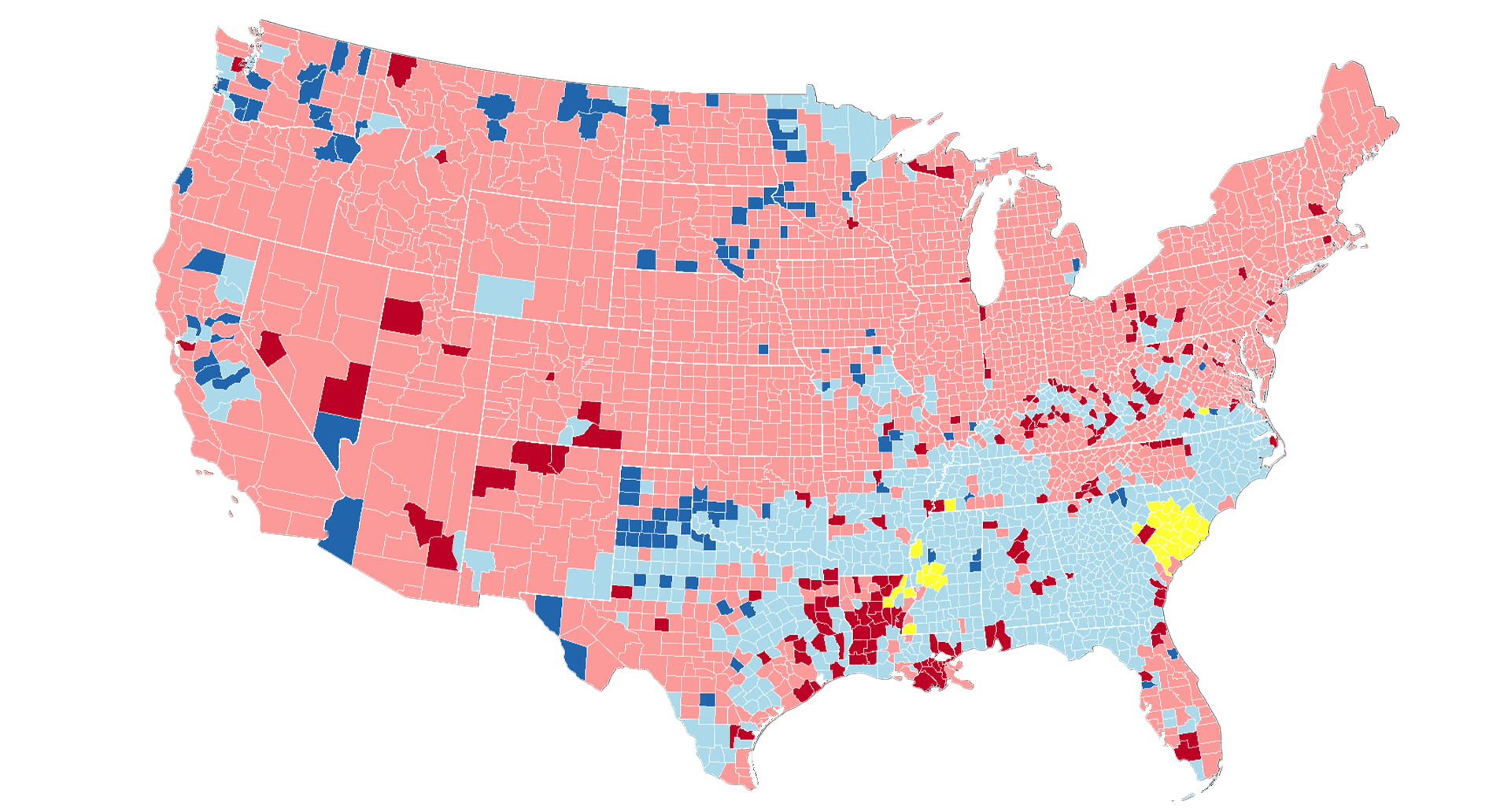
Light red indicates GOP hold, dark red indicates GOP flip, dark blue indicates Dem flip, while yellow indicates Unpledged electors.

=== Results by state ===
States/districts won by Stevenson/Kefauver
States/districts won by Eisenhower/Nixon

		Dwight D. Eisenhower Republican			Adlai Stevenson Democratic			T. Coleman Andrews/Unpledged Electors (Note: Was allied with a slate of unpledged electors in Louisiana, Mississippi and South Carolina) States' Rights			Eric Hass Socialist Labor			Margin		State Total	
State	electoral votes	#	%	electoral votes	#	%	electoral votes	#	%	electoral votes	#	%	electoral votes	#	%	#	
Alabama	11	195,694	39.39	-	280,844	56.52	10	20,323	4.09	-	-	-	-	-85,150	-17.13	496,871	AL
Arizona	4	176,990	60.99	4	112,880	38.90	-	303	0.10	-	-	-	-	64,110	22.09	290,173	AZ
Arkansas	8	186,287	45.82	-	213,277	52.46	8	7,008	1.72	-	-	-	-	-26,990	-6.64	406,572	AR
California	32	3,027,668	55.39	32	2,420,135	44.27	-	6,087	0.11	-	300	0.01	-	607,533	11.11	5,466,355	CA
Colorado	6	394,479	59.49	6	263,997	39.81	-	759	0.11	-	3,308	0.50	-	130,482	19.68	663,074	CO
Connecticut	8	711,837	63.72	8	405,079	36.26	-	-	-	-	-	-	-	306,758	27.46	1,117,121	CT
Delaware	3	98,057	55.09	3	79,421	44.62	-	-	-	-	110	0.06	-	18,636	10.47	177,988	DE
Florida	10	643,849	57.27	10	480,371	42.73	-	-	-	-	-	-	-	163,478	14.54	1,124,220	FL
Georgia	12	216,652	32.65	-	441,094	66.48	12	-	-	-	-	-	-	-224,442	-33.83	663,480	GA
Idaho	4	166,979	61.17	4	105,868	38.78	-	-	-	-	-	-	-	61,111	22.39	272,989	ID
Illinois	27	2,623,327	59.52	27	1,775,682	40.29	-	-	-	-	8,342	0.19	-	847,645	19.23	4,407,407	IL
Indiana	13	1,182,811	59.90	13	783,908	39.70	-	-	-	-	1,334	0.07	-	398,903	20.20	1,974,607	IN
Iowa	10	729,187	59.06	10	501,858	40.65	-	3,202	0.26	-	125	0.01	-	227,329	18.41	1,234,564	IA
Kansas	8	566,878	65.44	8	296,317	34.21	-	-	-	-	-	-	-	270,561	31.23	866,243	KS
Kentucky	10	572,192	54.30	10	476,453	45.21	-	-	-	-	358	0.03	-	95,739	9.09	1,053,805	KY
Louisiana	10	329,047	53.28	10	243,977	39.51	-	44,520	7.21	-	-	-	-	85,070	13.78	617,544	LA
Maine	5	249,238	70.87	5	102,468	29.13	-	-	-	-	-	-	-	146,770	41.73	351,706	ME
Maryland	9	559,738	60.04	9	372,613	39.96	-	-	-	-	-	-	-	187,125	20.07	932,351	MD
Massachusetts	16	1,393,197	59.32	16	948,190	40.37	-	-	-	-	5,573	0.24	-	445,007	18.95	2,348,506	MA
Michigan	20	1,713,647	55.63	20	1,359,898	44.15	-	-	-	-	-	-	-	353,749	11.48	3,080,468	MI
Minnesota	11	719,302	53.68	11	617,525	46.08	-	-	-	-	2,080	0.16	-	101,777	7.60	1,340,005	MN
Mississippi	8	60,685	24.46	-	144,498	58.23	8	42,966	17.31	-	-	-	-	-83,813	-33.78	248,149	MS
Missouri	13	914,289	49.89	-	918,273	50.11	13	-	-	-	-	-	-	-3,984	-0.22	1,832,562	MO
Montana	4	154,933	57.13	4	116,238	42.87	-	-	-	-	-	-	-	38,695	14.27	271,171	MT
Nebraska	6	378,108	65.51	6	199,029	34.49	-	-	-	-	-	-	-	179,079	31.03	577,137	NE
Nevada	3	56,049	57.97	3	40,640	42.03	-	-	-	-	-	-	-	15,409	15.94	96,689	NV
New Hampshire	4	176,519	66.11	4	90,364	33.84	-	111	0.04	-	-	-	-	86,155	32.27	266,994	NH
New Jersey	16	1,606,942	64.68	16	850,337	34.23	-	5,317	0.21	-	6,736	0.27	-	756,605	30.46	2,484,312	NJ
New Mexico	4	146,788	57.81	4	106,098	41.78	-	364	0.14	-	69	0.03	-	40,690	16.02	253,926	NM
New York	45	4,340,340	61.19	45	2,750,769	38.78	-	-	-	-	-	-	-	1,589,571	22.41	7,093,336	NY
North Carolina	14	575,062	49.34	-	590,530	50.66	14	-	-	-	-	-	-	-15,468	-1.33	1,165,592	NC
North Dakota	4	156,766	61.72	4	96,742	38.09	-	483	0.19	-	-	-	-	60,024	23.63	253,991	ND
Ohio	25	2,262,610	61.11	25	1,439,655	38.89	-	-	-	-	-	-	-	822,955	22.23	3,702,265	OH
Oklahoma	8	473,769	55.13	8	385,581	44.87	-	-	-	-	-	-	-	88,188	10.26	859,350	OK
Oregon	6	406,393	55.25	6	329,204	44.75	-	-	-	-	-	-	-	77,189	10.49	735,597	OR
Pennsylvania	32	2,585,252	56.49	32	1,981,769	43.30	-	-	-	-	7,447	0.16	-	603,483	13.19	4,576,503	PA
Rhode Island	4	225,819	58.26	4	161,790	41.74	-	-	-	-	-	-	-	64,029	16.52	387,611	RI
South Carolina	8	75,700	25.18	-	136,372	45.37	8	88,511	29.45	-	-	-	-	-47,863	-15.92	300,583	SC
South Dakota	4	171,569	58.39	4	122,288	41.61	-	-	-	-	-	-	-	49,281	16.77	293,857	SD
Tennessee	11	462,288	49.21	11	456,507	48.60	-	19,820	2.11	-	-	-	-	5,781	0.62	939,404	TN
Texas	24	1,080,619	55.26	24	859,958	43.98	-	14,591	0.75	-	-	-	-	220,661	11.28	1,955,545	TX
Utah	4	215,631	64.56	4	118,364	35.44	-	-	-	-	-	-	-	97,267	29.12	333,995	UT
Vermont	3	110,390	72.16	3	42,549	27.81	-	-	-	-	-	-	-	67,841	44.35	152,978	VT
Virginia	12	386,459	55.37	12	267,760	38.36	-	42,964	6.16	-	351	0.05	-	118,699	17.01	697,978	VA
Washington	9	620,430	53.91	9	523,002	45.44	-	-	-	-	7,457	0.65	-	97,428	8.47	1,150,889	WA
West Virginia	8	449,297	54.08	8	381,534	45.92	-	-	-	-	-	-	-	67,763	8.16	830,831	WV
Wisconsin	12	954,844	61.58	12	586,768	37.84	-	6,918	0.45	-	710	0.05	-	368,076	23.74	1,550,558	WI
Wyoming	3	74,573	60.08	3	49,554	39.92	-	-	-	-	-	-	-	25,019	20.16	124,127	WY
TOTALS:	531	35,579,180	57.37	457	26,028,028	41.97	73	301,417	0.49	-	44,300	0.07	-	9,551,152	15.40	62,021,979	US

==== States that flipped from Republican to Democratic ====
- Missouri

==== States that flipped from Democratic to Republican ====
- Kentucky
- Louisiana
- West Virginia

=== Close states ===
Margin of victory less than 1% (24 electoral votes):

1. Missouri, 0.22% (3,984 votes)
2. Tennessee, 0.62% (5,781 votes)

Margin of victory less than 5% (14 electoral votes):

1. North Carolina, 1.33% (15,468 votes)

Margin of victory over 5%, but under 10% (46 electoral votes)

1. Arkansas, 6.64% (26,990 votes)
2. Minnesota, 7.60% (101,777 votes)
3. West Virginia, 8.16% (67,763 votes)
4. Washington, 8.47% (97,428 votes)
5. Kentucky, 9.09% (95,739 votes)

Tipping point state:

1. Florida, 14.54% (163,478 votes)

^{(a)} Alabama faithless elector W. F. Turner, who was pledged to Adlai Stevenson and Estes Kefauver, instead cast his votes for Walter Burgwyn Jones, who was a circuit court judge in Turner's home town, and Herman Talmadge, governor of the neighboring state of Georgia. Because of the admission of Alaska and Hawaii as states in 1959, the 1956 presidential election was the last in which there were 531 electoral votes.

==== Statistics ====
Counties with Highest Percent of Vote (Republican)

1. Gillespie County, Texas 92.61%
2. Kenedy County, Texas 92.59%
3. Kane County, Utah 90.20%
4. Jackson County, Kentucky 88.35%
5. Johnson County, Tennessee 87.44%

Counties with Highest Percent of Vote (Democratic)

1. Baker County, Georgia 96.07%
2. Greene County, North Carolina 93.67%
3. Berrien County, Georgia 93.56%
4. Atkinson County, Georgia 93.37%
5. Madison County, Georgia 93.24%

Counties with Highest Percent of Vote (Other)

1. Williamsburg County, South Carolina 73.00%
2. Clarendon County, South Carolina 66.88%
3. Sumter County, South Carolina 62.00%
4. Bamberg County, South Carolina 59.66%
5. Calhoun County, South Carolina 58.73%

== See also ==
- 1956 United States gubernatorial elections
- 1956 United States House of Representatives elections
- 1956 United States Senate elections
- History of the United States (1945–1964)
- Second inauguration of Dwight D. Eisenhower
