= Love Hill, Alabama =

Unincorporated community in Alabama, United States

- Unincorporated community
- Location within Alabama Location within the United States
- Coordinates: 31°06′58″N 85°16′26″W
- Country: United States
- State: Alabama
- County: Houston
- Elevation: 243 ft (74 m)
- Time zone: UTC-6 (Central (CST))
  - Summer (DST): UTC-5 (CDT)
- Area code: 334
- GNIS feature ID: 122057

Love Hill is an unincorporated community in Houston County, Alabama, United States.
