= Taylor, Alabama =

- Town
- Flag Seal

- Location of Taylor in Geneva County and Houston County, Alabama.
- Coordinates: 31°09′57″N 85°28′11″W
- Country: United States
- State: Alabama
- Counties: Houston, Geneva

Area
  - Total: 7.31 sq mi (18.94 km^{2})
  - Land: 7.23 sq mi (18.73 km^{2})
  - Water: 0.081 sq mi (0.21 km^{2})
- Elevation: 335 ft (102 m)

Population (2020)
  - Total: 2,262
  - Density: 312.8/sq mi (120.76/km^{2})
- Time zone: UTC-6 (Central (CST))
  - Summer (DST): UTC-5 (CDT)
- ZIP codes: 36301, 36305
- Area code: 334
- FIPS code: 01-75096
- GNIS feature ID: 2406717
- Website: www.cityoftaylor.org

Taylor is a town in Geneva and Houston counties in the U.S. state of Alabama. Taylor was first settled in the 1870s, named after an early family that helped secure the first post office. It was not incorporated until almost a century later in June 1967. It is part of the Dothan, Alabama Metropolitan Statistical Area. As of the 2020 census, Taylor had a population of 2,262.

== Geography ==
Taylor is located in western Houston County. A rural portion of the town extends west into Geneva County. Taylor is bordered to the northeast by Dothan, to the southeast by Rehobeth, and to the southwest by Malvern. Alabama State Route 52 (Hartford Highway) passes through the northern part of Taylor, leading northeast 6 miles (10 km) to the center of Dothan and southwest 9 miles (14 km) to Slocomb.

According to the U.S. Census Bureau, Taylor has a total area of 7.5 square miles (19.4 km^{2}), of which 7.4 square miles (19.1 km^{2}) is land and 0.1 square miles (0.2 km^{2}), or 1.09%, is water.

== Demographics ==
Historical population
Census	Pop.	Note	%±
1970	174		—
1980	1,003		476.4%
1990	1,352		34.8%
2000	1,898		40.4%
2010	2,375		25.1%
2020	2,262		−4.8%
U.S. Decennial Census; 2013 Estimate

=== 2020 census ===
As of the 2020 census, Taylor had a population of 2,262. The median age was 35.3 years. 27.7% of residents were under the age of 18 and 11.8% of residents were 65 years of age or older. For every 100 females there were 93.3 males, and for every 100 females age 18 and over there were 89.0 males age 18 and over.

60.1% of residents lived in urban areas, while 39.9% lived in rural areas.

There were 812 households in Taylor, of which 40.4% had children under the age of 18 living in them. Of all households, 53.0% were married-couple households, 12.6% were households with a male householder and no spouse or partner present, and 26.8% were households with a female householder and no spouse or partner present. About 19.6% of all households were made up of individuals and 7.6% had someone living alone who was 65 years of age or older. There were 534 families residing in the town.

There were 926 housing units, of which 12.3% were vacant. The homeowner vacancy rate was 0.9% and the rental vacancy rate was 15.7%.

Taylor racial composition
Race	Num.	Perc.
White (non-Hispanic)	1,843	81.48%
Black or African American (non-Hispanic)	204	9.02%
Native American	9	0.4%
Asian	7	0.31%
Pacific Islander	2	0.09%
Other/Mixed	94	4.16%
Hispanic or Latino	103	4.55%

=== 2010 census ===
At the 2010 census there were 2,375 people, 835 households, and 639 families living in the town. The population density was 329.9 inhabitants per square mile (127.4/km^{2}). There were 966 housing units at an average density of 134.2 per square mile (51.8/km^{2}). The racial makeup of the town was 87.5% White, 7.2% Black or African American, 0.8% Native American, 0.1% Asian, 2.4% from other races, and 2.1% from two or more races. 5.2% of the population were Hispanic or Latino of any race. Of the 835 households 43.0% had children under the age of 18 living with them, 53.8% were married couples living together, 18.2% had a female householder with no husband present, and 23.5% were non-families. 19.3% of households were one person and 6.1% were one person aged 65 or older. The average household size was 2.84 and the average family size was 3.22.

The age distribution was 31.6% under the age of 18, 8.2% from 18 to 24, 30.4% from 25 to 44, 22.1% from 45 to 64, and 7.8% 65 or older. The median age was 31.5 years. For every 100 females, there were 96.3 males. For every 100 females age 18 and over, there were 89.5 males.

The median household income was $43,603 and the median family income was $49,500. Males had a median income of $31,795 versus $29,276 for females. The per capita income for the town was $16,833. About 16.9% of families and 21.0% of the population were below the poverty line, including 32.3% of those under age 18 and 10.5% of those age 65 or over.

=== 2000 census ===
At the 2000 census there were 1,898 people, 699 households, and 552 families living in the town. The population density was 267.4 inhabitants per square mile (103.2/km^{2}). There were 751 housing units at an average density of 105.8 per square mile (40.8/km^{2}). The racial makeup of the town was 93.05% White, 3.79% Black or African American, 0.79% Native American, 0.26% Asian, 0.74% from other races, and 1.37% from two or more races. 1.11% of the population were Hispanic or Latino of any race. Of the 699 households 47.2% had children under the age of 18 living with them, 61.9% were married couples living together, 12.3% had a female householder with no husband present, and 21.0% were non-families. 18.3% of households were one person and 4.6% were one person aged 65 or older. The average household size was 2.72 and the average family size was 3.09.

The age distribution was 31.7% under the age of 18, 7.6% from 18 to 24, 35.6% from 25 to 44, 17.9% from 45 to 64, and 7.2% 65 or older. The median age was 31 years. For every 100 females, there were 97.5 males. For every 100 females age 18 and over, there were 94.0 males.

The median household income was $40,664 and the median family income was $44,181. Males had a median income of $32,401 versus $22,321 for females. The per capita income for the town was $16,327. About 8.7% of families and 9.9% of the population were below the poverty line, including 12.8% of those under age 18 and 10.6% of those age 65 or over.
