= Houston County, Alabama =

County in Alabama, United States

- County
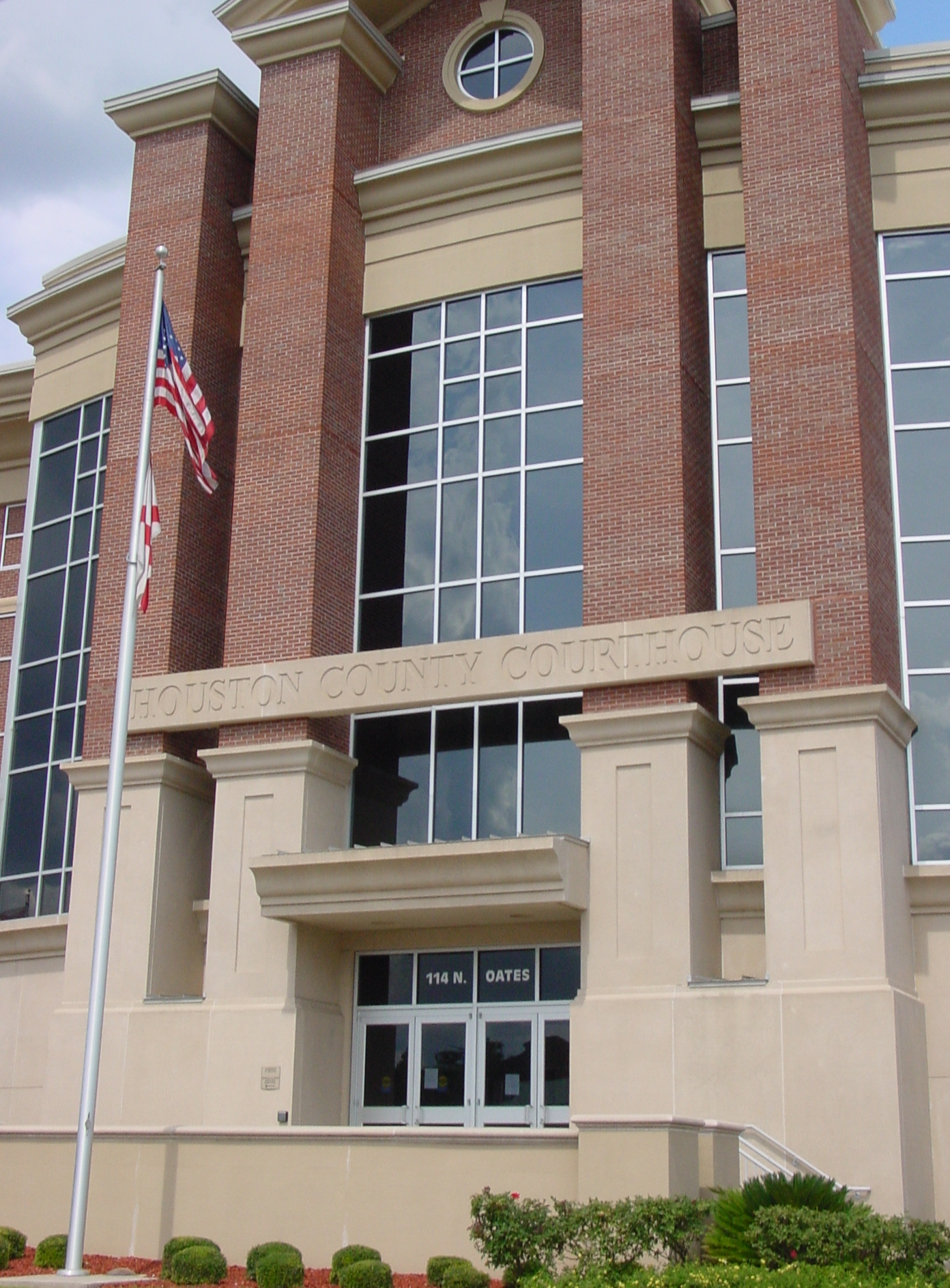
- Houston County Courthouse in Dothan

- Seal

- Location within the U.S. state of Alabama
- Coordinates: 31°09′08″N 85°17′36″W
- Country: United States
- State: Alabama
- Founded: February 9, 1903
- Named for: George S. Houston
- Seat: Dothan
- Largest city: Dothan

Area
  - Total: 582 sq mi (1,510 km^{2})
  - Land: 580 sq mi (1,500 km^{2})
  - Water: 1.8 sq mi (4.7 km^{2}) 0.3%

Population (2020)
  - Total: 107,202
  - Estimate (2025): 110,318 ▲
  - Density: 180/sq mi (71/km^{2})
- Time zone: UTC−6 (Central)
  - Summer (DST): UTC−5 (CDT)
- Congressional district: 1st
- Website: houstoncountyal.gov
- County Number 38 on Alabama Licence Plates

Houston County is a county located in the southeastern corner of the U.S. state of Alabama. As of the 2020 census the population was 107,202. Its county seat is Dothan, which is located on the border and partially in adjacent Henry County.

Houston County is part of the Dothan, Alabama metropolitan area.

== History ==
Houston County was established on February 9, 1903, from parts of Dale, Geneva, and Henry counties. It was named after George Smith Houston, the 24th Governor of Alabama. This area of the state was historically developed for the pine timber and turpentine industries, as well as cotton plantations. The latter, especially, depended on enslaved African Americans for labor.

Because of this history, African Americans predominated in the population until after the early 20th century, when many migrated to northern and midwestern cities for better economic opportunities and to escape Jim Crow discrimination. They were essentially disenfranchised after the turn of the 20th century because of constitutional amendments and other laws that made voter registration nearly impossible. Many poor whites were disenfranchised at the same time.

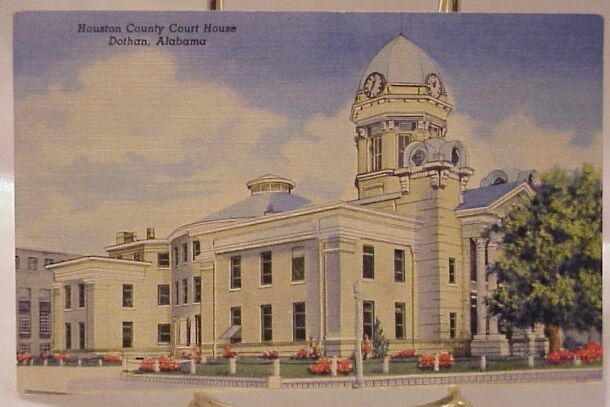
Original Courthouse

== Geography ==
According to the United States Census Bureau, the county has a total area of 582 square miles (1,510 km^{2}), of which 580 square miles (1,500 km^{2}) is land and 1.8 square miles (4.7 km^{2}) (0.3%) is water. The county is located in the Wiregrass region of southeast Alabama. It is the only Alabama county is the borders both Georgia and Florida

=== Major highways ===
- US 84 / SR 12 (unsigned)
- US 231
- US 431
- SR 1 (unsigned)
- SR 52
- SR 53
- SR 92
- SR 95
- SR 103
- SR 123
- SR 134
- SR 210
- SR 605

=== Adjacent counties ===
- Henry County (north)
- Early County, Georgia (east)
- Seminole County, Georgia (southeast)
- Jackson County, Florida (south)
- Geneva County (west)
- Dale County (northwest)

== Demographics ==
Historical population
Census	Pop.	Note	%±
1910	32,414		—
1920	37,334		15.2%
1930	45,935		23.0%
1940	45,665		−0.6%
1950	46,522		1.9%
1960	50,718		9.0%
1970	56,574		11.5%
1980	74,632		31.9%
1990	81,331		9.0%
2000	88,787		9.2%
2010	101,547		14.4%
2020	107,202		5.6%
2025 (est.)	110,318	▲	2.9%
U.S. Decennial Census; 1790–1960 1900–1990; 1990–2000 2010–2020

=== 2020 census ===
As of the 2020 census, the county had a population of 107,202. The median age was 40.8 years. 22.9% of residents were under the age of 18 and 18.9% of residents were 65 years of age or older. For every 100 females there were 91.2 males, and for every 100 females age 18 and over there were 86.7 males age 18 and over.

The racial makeup of the county was 64.6% White, 26.5% Black or African American, 0.5% American Indian and Alaska Native, 1.2% Asian, 0.1% Native Hawaiian and Pacific Islander, 2.0% from some other race, and 5.2% from two or more races. Hispanic or Latino residents of any race comprised 4.2% of the population.

65.7% of residents lived in urban areas, while 34.3% lived in rural areas.

There were 44,368 households in the county, of which 29.6% had children under the age of 18 living with them and 32.8% had a female householder with no spouse or partner present. About 30.2% of all households were made up of individuals and 13.4% had someone living alone who was 65 years of age or older.

There were 49,282 housing units, of which 10.0% were vacant. Among occupied housing units, 62.7% were owner-occupied and 37.3% were renter-occupied. The homeowner vacancy rate was 1.9% and the rental vacancy rate was 8.3%.

=== Racial and ethnic composition ===
Houston County, Alabama – Racial and ethnic composition Note: the US Census treats Hispanic/Latino as an ethnic category. This table excludes Latinos from the racial categories and assigns them to a separate category. Hispanics/Latinos may be of any race.
Race / Ethnicity (NH = Non-Hispanic)	Pop 2000	Pop 2010	Pop 2020	% 2000	% 2010	% 2020
White alone (NH)	64,312	69,731	68,251	72.43%	68.67%	63.67%
Black or African American alone (NH)	21,703	26,038	28,232	24.44%	25.64%	26.34%
Native American or Alaska Native alone (NH)	318	393	321	0.36%	0.39%	0.30%
Asian alone (NH)	548	806	1,260	0.62%	0.79%	1.18%
Pacific Islander alone (NH)	13	43	59	0.01%	0.04%	0.06%
Other race alone (NH)	55	96	354	0.06%	0.09%	0.33%
Mixed race or Multiracial (NH)	716	1,445	4,244	0.81%	1.42%	3.96%
Hispanic or Latino (any race)	1,122	2,995	4,481	1.26%	2.95%	4.18%
Total	88,787	101,547	107,202	100.00%	100.00%	100.00%

=== 2010 census ===
As of the census of 2010, there were 101,547 people, 40,969 households, and 28,041 families living in the county. The population density was 175 people per square mile (68 people/km^{2}). There were 45,319 housing units at an average density of 77.9 units per square mile (30.1 units/km^{2}). The racial makeup of the county was 70.0% White, 25.8% Black or African American, 0.4% Native American, 0.8% Asian, 0.0% Pacific Islander, 1.2% from other races, and 1.7% from two or more races. 2.9% of the population were Hispanic or Latino of any race.

There were 40,969 households, out of which 29.2% had children under the age of 18 living with them, 47.9% were married couples living together, 16.2% had a female householder with no husband present, and 31.6% were non-families. 27.2% of all households were made up of individuals, and 9.7% had someone living alone who was 65 years of age or older. The average household size was 2.44 and the average family size was 2.96.

In the county, the population was spread out, with 24.5% under the age of 18, 8.3% from 18 to 24, 25.7% from 25 to 44, 27.0% from 45 to 64, and 14.5% who were 65 years of age or older. The median age was 38.5 years. For every 100 females, there were 92.3 males. For every 100 females age 18 and over, there were 92.5 males.

The median income for a household in the county was $41,022, and the median income for a family was $51,741. Males had a median income of $41,021 versus $28,240 for females. The per capita income for the county was $22,725. About 12.7% of families and 16.8% of the population were below the poverty line, including 25.8% of those under age 18 and 11.5% of those age 65 or over.

=== 2000 census ===
As of the census of 2000, there were 88,787 people, 35,834 households, and 25,119 families living in the county. The population density was 153 people per square mile (59 people/km^{2}). There were 39,571 housing units at an average density of 68 units per square mile (26 units/km^{2}). The racial makeup of the county was 73.08% White, 24.60% Black or African American, 0.37% Native American, 0.62% Asian, 0.02% Pacific Islander, 0.39% from other races, and 0.92% from two or more races. 1.26% of the population were Hispanic or Latino of any race.

There were 35,834 households, out of which 33.00% had children under the age of 18 living with them, 52.50% were married couples living together, 14.10% had a female householder with no husband present, and 29.90% were non-families. 26.40% of all households were made up of individuals, and 10.10% had someone living alone who was 65 years of age or older. The average household size was 2.45 and the average family size was 2.95.

In the county, the population was spread out, with 25.90% under the age of 18, 8.20% from 18 to 24, 28.70% from 25 to 44, 23.50% from 45 to 64, and 13.70% who were 65 years of age or older. The median age was 37 years. For every 100 females, there were 95.0 males. For every 100 females age 18 and over, there were 86.20 males.

The median income for a household in the county was $34,431, and the median income for a family was $42,437. Males had a median income of $32,092 versus $21,409 for females. The per capita income for the county was $18,759. About 11.80% of families and 15.00% of the population were below the poverty line, including 21.10% of those under age 18 and 16.30% of those age 65 or over.

== Government ==
As of 2025, the County Chairman is Brandon Shoupe, while Peter Covert is the Chief Administrative Officer. The County Commission is:

- District 1, Curtis Harvey
- District 2, Tracy Adams
- District 3, Rickey Herring
- District 4, James Ivey

Donald Valenza serves as Sheriff, Probate Judge is Patrick Davenport, Revenue Commissioner is Starla Moss, and Coroner is Robert Byrd. The county engineer is Barkley Kirkland. The District Attorney serves as prosecutor for cases in both Houston and Henry Counties.

Houston County is located in Alabama's 1st congressional district; its current Representative (as of 2025) is Barry Moore (R).

Houston County is reliably Republican at the presidential level. The last Democrat to win the county in a presidential election was Adlai Stevenson, who won it by a majority in 1956.

United States presidential election results for Houston County, Alabama
Year	Republican		Democratic		Third party(ies)	
Year	No.	%	No.	%	No.	%
1904	384	22.30%	1,248	72.47%	90	5.23%
1908	423	29.03%	965	66.23%	69	4.74%
1912	82	4.96%	1,160	70.18%	411	24.86%
1916	466	21.22%	1,670	76.05%	60	2.73%
1920	571	21.50%	2,045	77.00%	40	1.51%
1924	242	11.72%	1,731	83.87%	91	4.41%
1928	1,963	46.12%	2,290	53.81%	3	0.07%
1932	157	3.89%	3,863	95.83%	11	0.27%
1936	230	6.08%	3,538	93.52%	15	0.40%
1940	483	10.88%	3,941	88.78%	15	0.34%
1944	282	7.73%	3,349	91.80%	17	0.47%
1948	426	13.46%	0	0.00%	2,739	86.54%
1952	2,517	39.55%	3,779	59.38%	68	1.07%
1956	2,632	38.47%	3,630	53.06%	579	8.46%
1960	4,055	50.58%	3,897	48.61%	65	0.81%
1964	10,353	87.93%	0	0.00%	1,421	12.07%
1968	974	5.89%	1,488	9.00%	14,074	85.11%
1972	12,622	83.46%	2,358	15.59%	144	0.95%
1976	10,672	54.07%	8,787	44.52%	279	1.41%
1980	14,884	64.05%	7,848	33.77%	506	2.18%
1984	20,854	75.82%	6,488	23.59%	163	0.59%
1988	19,989	73.87%	7,001	25.87%	71	0.26%
1992	17,360	58.33%	8,857	29.76%	3,543	11.91%
1996	17,476	62.27%	8,791	31.33%	1,796	6.40%
2000	22,150	69.10%	9,412	29.36%	495	1.54%
2004	26,874	74.24%	9,144	25.26%	183	0.51%
2008	29,254	70.09%	12,225	29.29%	256	0.61%
2012	29,270	69.72%	12,367	29.46%	347	0.83%
2016	30,728	72.07%	10,664	25.01%	1,247	2.92%
2020	32,618	70.64%	12,917	27.98%	638	1.38%
2024	32,469	73.21%	11,352	25.60%	528	1.19%

United States Senate election results for Houston County, Alabama2
Year	Republican		Democratic		Third party(ies)	
Year	No.	%	No.	%	No.	%
2020	31,462	68.35%	14,494	31.49%	77	0.17%

United States Senate election results for Houston County, Alabama3
Year	Republican		Democratic		Third party(ies)	
Year	No.	%	No.	%	No.	%
2022	21,246	76.96%	5,854	21.20%	508	1.84%

Alabama Gubernatorial election results for Houston County
Year	Republican		Democratic		Third party(ies)	
Year	No.	%	No.	%	No.	%
2022	21,139	76.52%	5,634	20.39%	852	3.08%

== Communities ==
=== City ===
- Dothan (county seat; partly in Dale County and Henry County)

=== Towns ===
- Ashford
- Avon
- Columbia
- Cottonwood
- Cowarts
- Gordon
- Kinsey
- Madrid
- Rehobeth
- Taylor (partly in Geneva County)
- Webb

=== Unincorporated communities ===
- Ardilla
- Big Creek
- Crosby
- Grangeburg
- Love Hill
- Lucy
- Pansey
- Peterman
- Pleasant Plains
- Wicksburg

== Education ==
There are two school districts including parts of the county: Dothan City School District and Houston County Schools.

== See also ==
- National Register of Historic Places listings in Houston County, Alabama
- Properties on the Alabama Register of Landmarks and Heritage in Houston County, Alabama
