= W. F. Turner =

American politician (1891–1958)

William F. Turner (1891 – January 3, 1958) was a Montgomery accountant and a United States Democratic elector from Alabama during the 1956 United States presidential election.

== 1956 presidential election ==
He is remembered as a faithless elector.

Although he pledged to vote for the Democratic ticket of Presidential nominee Adlai Stevenson and his running-mate Estes Kefauver, he cast his presidential vote on December 17, 1956, for a circuit court judge from his hometown, Walter Burgwyn Jones, who was totally unknown outside his area: he was allowed to do so thanks to a 1949 Supreme Court of Alabama ruling stating electors were free agents.

While Turner voted for well-known United States Senator Herman Talmadge from Georgia for Vice President, this was only after being informed his first choice, John Malcolm Patterson, would be impossible due to the requirement that any presidential ticket be taken from two different states.

When fellow elector Tom Cochrane confronted him about "[his] obligation", Turner replied "I have fulfilled my obligations to the people of Alabama. I'm talking about the white people", a comment which suggested that he opposed Stevenson and Kefauver, who were liberal on civil rights (unlike Jones and Senator Talmadge, known for their pro-segregationist stance).

== Death ==
Turner died on January 3, 1958, in Montgomery, aged 66.
