= Walter Burgwyn Jones =

American judge and politician

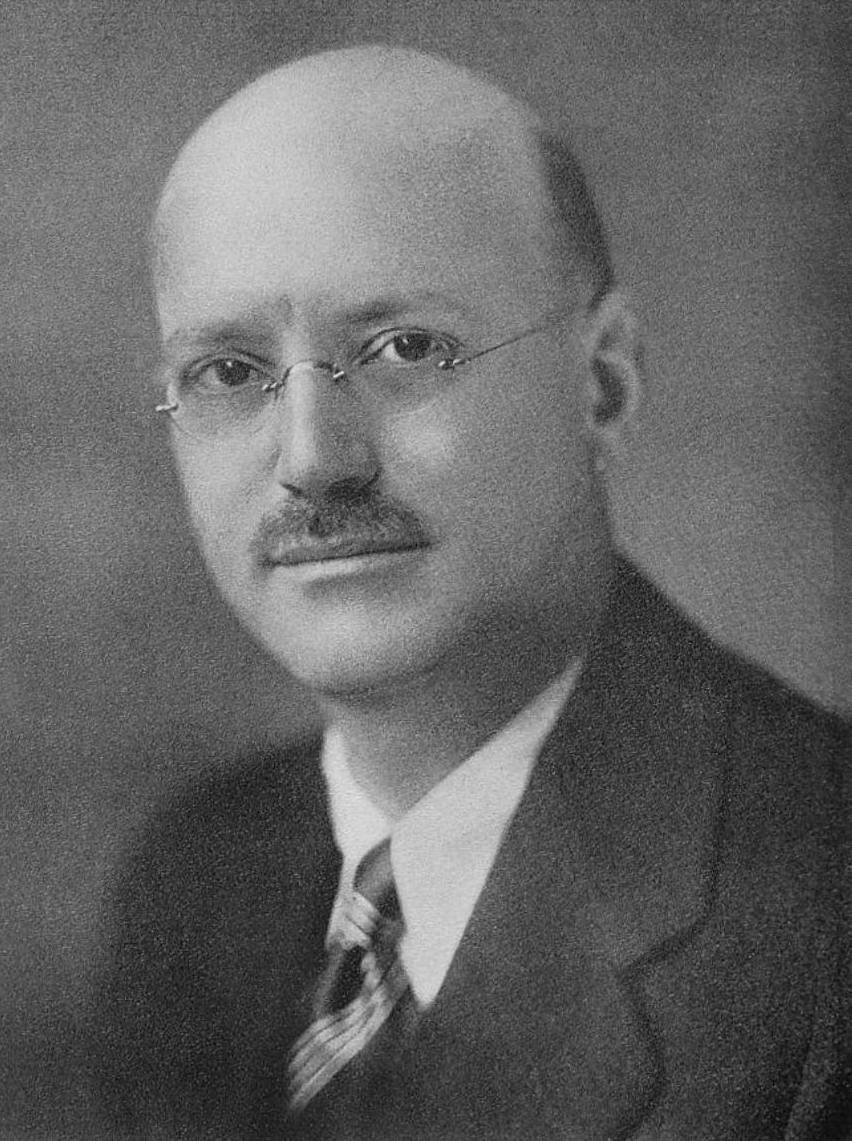
- Jones in 1929

Member of the Alabama House of Representatives
- In office 1919–1920

Personal details
- Born: October 16, 1888 Montgomery, Alabama, US
- Died: August 1, 1963 (aged 74) Montgomery, Alabama, US
- Party: Democratic
- Occupation: Judge, politician, writer

Walter Burgwyn Jones (October 16, 1888 – August 1, 1963) was an Alabama circuit court judge, state legislator, attorney, and writer from Montgomery, Montgomery County. As a judge and avowed white supremacist, he played key roles in several notable civil rights cases attempting to stymie the advancement of civil rights in Alabama. An active community member, he served on numerous boards and held active leadership roles in many community organizations. In 1928, he founded the Jones School of Law at Faulkner University, named for his father, former Alabama governor Thomas Goode Jones.

== Political career ==
Jones served in the Alabama House of Representatives, as a Democrat, from 1919 to 1920. He was then a circuit court judge until 1935. Jones was a presiding judge from 1935 to 1963.

In 1956, Jones granted an injunction against the operation of the National Association for the Advancement of Colored People within the state of Alabama. The injunction had been prepared secretly by state Attorney General John Malcolm Patterson and was granted by Jones "in a stunning abuse of judicial power ... without so much as a public hearing." The injunction also demanded the NAACP hand over the names and addresses of every Alabama member of the organization.

While presiding over a trial that would later be appealed to the Supreme Court of the United States as New York Times Co. v. Sullivan in 1960, Jones ruled that the presence of an Alabama lawyer representing The New York Times contributed to the existence of a substantial business interest in the state of Alabama. This ruling ensured that the lawsuit would play out in his own courtroom. In so doing, he overruled his own book, Alabama Pleading and Practice. Jones was an avowed white-supremacist. While presiding in Sullivan, Jones began by lecturing against "racial agitators" and in praise of "white man's justice".

== Personal life ==
Walter Burgwyn Jones was also a writer. His father was Thomas G. Jones, the Governor of Alabama. Jones was born in Montgomery, Alabama; he went to Alabama Polytechnic Institute in 1906 and 1907. Jones then received his law degree in 1909 from the University of Alabama School of Law.

He died at his home in Montgomery on August 1, 1963.

== United States presidential election of 1956 ==
Electoral College 1956 map

In the 1956 Presidential election, faithless elector W. F. Turner cast his vote for Jones, who was a circuit court judge in Turner's home town, for President of the United States and Herman E. Talmadge for Vice President, instead of voting for Adlai Stevenson and Estes Kefauver.

== Published works ==
- Alabama practices and forms 1947
- Jones' equity pleading and practices 1954
- Confederate war poems 1959
- Alabama pleading and practice at law 1960
- Citizenship and voting in Alabama 1947
- Alabama secedes from the Union 1900
- Alabama jury instructions 1953
- John Burgwin, Carolinian, John Jones, Virginian, Their Ancestors and Descedents 1913
