= Peter Mann =

Peter Mann may refer to:

- Peter Mann (footballer) (born 1970), Australian rules footballer
- Peter Mann (bishop) (1924–1999), Anglican bishop
- Peter H. Mann (1926–2008), English sociologist
