= Big Creek, Alabama =

Unincorporated community in Alabama, United States

- Unincorporated community
- Location within Alabama Location within the United States
- Coordinates: 31°04′07″N 85°26′02″W
- Country: United States
- State: Alabama
- County: Houston
- Elevation: 200 ft (61 m)
- Time zone: UTC-6 (Central (CST))
  - Summer (DST): UTC-5 (CDT)
- Area code: 334
- GNIS feature ID: 114256

Big Creek is an unincorporated community in Houston County, Alabama, United States.

== History ==
A post office operated under the name Big Creek from 1850 to 1906.
