= Madrid, Alabama =

- Town
- Location of Madrid in Houston County, Alabama.
- Coordinates: 31°02′08″N 85°23′57″W
- Country: United States
- State: Alabama
- County: Houston

Area
  - Total: 1.75 sq mi (4.52 km^{2})
  - Land: 1.75 sq mi (4.52 km^{2})
  - Water: 0 sq mi (0.00 km^{2})
- Elevation: 180 ft (55 m)

Population (2020)
  - Total: 265
  - Density: 151.7/sq mi (58.57/km^{2})
- Time zone: UTC-6 (Central (CST))
  - Summer (DST): UTC-5 (CDT)
- ZIP code: 36320
- Area code: 334
- FIPS code: 01-45904
- GNIS feature ID: 2406075

Madrid (/ˈmædrɪd/ MAD-rid) is a town in Houston County, Alabama, United States. It is part of the Dothan, Alabama Metropolitan Statistical Area. As of the 2020 census, Madrid had a population of 265.

== History ==
In 1905, A. B. Steele began to build the Bay Line Railroad from Panama City, Florida to Dothan, Alabama. The Geneva Lumber Company also surveyed a country road from Cottonwood, Alabama to intersect the railroad.

In 1905, Ed Watford, a resident of Houston County, bought 180 acres at the intersection, intending for it to become a town.

At the same time, land speculator J. B. Dell and his partner W. C. Fenn, prominent people in Houston County, bought 80 acres east of Watford's property. They were able to record the acreage at the courthouse as the town of "Madrid" before Watford could. Consequently, Watford's property became known as "Watford's Addition". Madrid was named after Madrid, Spain, but Dell decided to pronounce it differently with emphasis on the "Mad".

Watford, Dell, and Fenn all had their acres surveyed and then divided into lots. However, Dell and Fenn threw a big celebration for their public action, throwing a barbecue and hiring a brass brand. This enticed many buyers to come. Watford was successful in selling his 40 acres, and Dell and Fenn were able to sell most of their 80 acres.

After the auction, Madrid started to become a prosperous town. A ready market existed in the town for timber, turpentine, and cotton. Many buildings, including stores and churches, began to be built in the town. Madrid also had a cotton oil mill and gin.

In 1912, Mayor Ed Watford founded the Bank of Madrid. The bank survived for 12 years before being closed in 1924.

After a prosperous beginning, Madrid's population began to precipitously decline when the boll weevil started attacking cotton crops and timber supplies were exhausted.

== Geography ==
Madrid is located in southwestern Houston County. U.S. Route 231 passes through the west side of the town, leading north 13 miles (21 km) to Dothan and south 18 miles (29 km) to Cottondale, Florida.

According to the U.S. Census Bureau, the town has a total area of 1.9 square miles (5.0 km^{2}), all land.

== Demographics ==
Historical population
Census	Pop.	Note	%±
1930	279		—
1940	229		−17.9%
1950	312		36.2%
1960	245		−21.5%
1970	238		−2.9%
1980	172		−27.7%
1990	211		22.7%
2000	303		43.6%
2010	350		15.5%
2020	265		−24.3%
U.S. Decennial Census; 2013 Estimate

=== 2020 census ===
Madrid racial composition
Race	Num.	Perc.
White (non-Hispanic)	227	85.66%
Black or African American (non-Hispanic)	19	7.17%
Asian	2	0.75%
Other/Mixed	6	2.26%
Hispanic or Latino	11	4.15%

As of the 2020 United States census, there were 265 people, 117 households, and 78 families residing in the town.

=== 2000 census ===
As of the census of 2000, there were 303 people, 119 households, and 89 families residing in the town. The population density was 156.1 inhabitants per square mile (60.3/km^{2}). There were 134 housing units at an average density of 69.0 per square mile (26.6/km^{2}). The racial makeup of the town was 82.84% White, 16.17% Black or African American, 0.33% Asian, and 0.66% from two or more races.

There were 119 households, out of which 42.0% had children under the age of 18 living with them, 60.5% were married couples living together, 10.9% had a female householder with no husband present, and 24.4% were non-families. 20.2% of all households were made up of individuals, and 12.6% had someone living alone who was 65 years of age or older. The average household size was 2.55 and the average family size was 2.96.

In the town, the population was spread out, with 29.4% under the age of 18, 6.6% from 18 to 24, 33.0% from 25 to 44, 19.1% from 45 to 64, and 11.9% who were 65 years of age or older. The median age was 34 years. For every 100 females, there were 85.9 males. For every 100 females age 18 and over, there were 86.1 males.

The median income for a household in the town was $14,943, and the median income for a family was $21,563. Males had a median income of $25,000 versus $16,563 for females. The per capita income for the town was $10,409. About 18.1% of families and 30.9% of the population were below the poverty line, including 31.6% of those under the age of eighteen and 51.5% of those 65 or over.
