= Rehobeth, Alabama =

- Town of the State of Alabama
- Location of Rehobeth, in Houston County, Alabama.
- Coordinates: 31°07′48″N 85°26′16″W
- Country: United States
- State: Alabama
- County: Houston
- Unincorporated community of Sanders: 1890s; 135 years ago

Government
  - Type: Mayor—City Council
  - Mayor: Kimberly Gilley Trotter (current and first elected town mayor)

Area
  - Total: 7.52 sq mi (19.47 km^{2})
  - Land: 7.49 sq mi (19.39 km^{2})
  - Water: 0.031 sq mi (0.08 km^{2})
- Elevation: 220 ft (67 m)

Population (2020)
  - Total: 1,791
  - Density: 239.2/sq mi (92.36/km^{2})
- Time zone: UTC−06:00 (Central (CST))
  - Summer (DST): UTC−05:00 (CDT)
- ZIP Codes: 36301, 36303, and 36305
- Area code: 334
- Town of Rehobeth incorporated: c. 1996
- FIPS code: 01-64152
- GNIS feature ID: 2407196
- Website: RehobethAlabama.com

Rehobeth is a town in Houston County, Alabama, United States. Rehobeth, originally named Sanders, began as a crossroads community in the 1890s; however, it was not until 1996, that the town was incorporated. Rehobeth is part of the Dothan Metropolitan Statistical Area. As of the 2020 census, Rehobeth had a population of 1,791.

== Geography ==
Rehobeth is located in western Houston County. It is bordered to the north by the city of Dothan and to the northwest by the town of Taylor.

According to the U.S. Census Bureau, Rehobeth has a total area of 7.6 square miles (19.7 km^{2}), of which 0.03-square-mile (0.08 km^{2}), or 0.41%, is water.

== Demographics ==
Historical population
Census	Pop.	Note	%±
2000	993		—
2010	1,297		30.6%
2020	1,791		38.1%
U.S. Decennial Census; 2013 Estimate

=== 2020 census ===
As of the 2020 census, Rehobeth had a population of 1,791. The median age was 38.2 years. 27.3% of residents were under the age of 18 and 13.4% of residents were 65 years of age or older. For every 100 females there were 94.9 males, and for every 100 females age 18 and over there were 92.3 males age 18 and over.

7.2% of residents lived in urban areas, while 92.8% lived in rural areas.

There were 637 households, including 486 family households, in Rehobeth. Of all households, 43.6% had children under the age of 18 living in them, 62.8% were married-couple households, 11.3% were households with a male householder and no spouse or partner present, and 20.6% were households with a female householder and no spouse or partner present. About 16.1% of all households were made up of individuals, and 8.9% had someone living alone who was 65 years of age or older.

There were 667 housing units, of which 4.5% were vacant. The homeowner vacancy rate was 0.2% and the rental vacancy rate was 5.2%.

Rehobeth racial composition
Race	Num.	Perc.
White (non-Hispanic)	1,535	85.71%
Black or African American (non-Hispanic)	99	5.53%
Native American	2	0.11%
Asian	8	0.45%
Other/Mixed	98	5.47%
Hispanic or Latino	49	2.74%

=== 2010 census ===
As of the 2010 census, there were 1,297 people in 485 households, including 388 families, in the town. The population density was 205.9 inhabitants per square mile (79.5/km^{2}). There were 528 housing units at an average density of 83.8 per square mile (32.4/km^{2}). The racial makeup of the town was 95.9% White, 1.5% Black or African American, 0.8% American Indian and Alaska Native, 0.2% Asian, 0.8% some other race, and 0.9% two or more races. Two-and-a-half percent of the population were Hispanic or Latino of any race.

Of the 485 households 35.5% had children under the age of 18 living with them, 66.0% were married couples living together, 8.7% had a female householder with no husband present, and 20.0% were non-families. 17.7% of households were one person and 7.6% were one person aged 65 or older. The average household size was 2.67 and the average family size was 3.02.

The age distribution was 26.2% under the age of 18, 7.6% from 18 to 24, 26.9% from 25 to 44, 27.2% from 45 to 64, and 12.1% 65 or older. The median age was 37.3 years. For every 100 females, there were 93.0 males. For every 100 females age 18 and over, there were 98.5 males.

The median household income was $51,328 and the median family income was $55,156. Males had a median income of $37,647 versus $31,898 for females. The per capita income for the town was $20,195. About 7.3% of families and 9.4% of the population were below the poverty line, including 11.2% of those under age 18 and 20.0% of those age 65 or over.

=== 2000 census ===
As enumerated in the census of 2000, there were 993 people in 375 households, including 292 families, in the town. The population density was 158.6 inhabitants per square mile (61.2/km^{2}). There were 399 housing units at an average density of 63.7 per square mile (24.6/km^{2}). The racial makeup of the town was 96.68% White, 0.81% Black or African American, 0.40% American Indian and Alaska Native, 0.10% Asian, 0.40% some other race, and 1.61% two or more races. 1.51% of the population were Hispanic or Latino of any race.

Of the 375 households 38.9% had children under the age of 18 living with them, 61.3% were married couples living together, 12.0% had a female householder with no husband present, and 22.1% were non-families. 20.3% of households were one person and 8.5% were one person aged 65 or older. The average household size was 2.65 and the average family size was 3.04.

The age distribution was 27.5% under the age of 18, 8.9% from 18 to 24, 30.0% from 25 to 44, 21.9% from 45 to 64, and 11.8% 65 or older. The median age was 37 years. For every 100 females, there were 96.6 males. For every 100 females age 18 and over, there were 91.0 males.

The median household income was $34,267 and the median family income was $39,625. Males had a median income of $31,513 versus $21,518 for females. The per capita income for the town was $17,149. About 12.6% of families and 14.2% of the population were below the poverty line, including 20.5% of those under age 18 and 13.9% of those age 65 or over.
