= Peterman, Monroe County, Alabama =

Peterman, Alabama
- Census-designated place
- Historic buildings in Peterman

- Location within Alabama Location within the United States
- Coordinates: 31°35′01″N 87°15′47″W
- Country: United States
- State: Alabama
- County: Monroe

Area
  - Total: 0.42 sq mi (1.09 km^{2})
  - Land: 0.42 sq mi (1.09 km^{2})
  - Water: 0 sq mi (0.00 km^{2})
- Elevation: 223 ft (68 m)

Population (2020)
  - Total: 87
  - Density: 205.9/sq mi (79.49/km^{2})
- Time zone: UTC-6 (Central (CST))
  - Summer (DST): UTC-5 (CDT)
- Area code: 251
- GNIS feature ID: 2628602
- FIPS code: 01-59232

Peterman is a census-designated place and unincorporated community in Monroe County, Alabama, United States. Its population was 87 as of the 2020 census.

== Demographics ==
Historical population
Census	Pop.	Note	%±
2010	89		—
2020	87		−2.2%
U.S. Decennial Census

Peterman was first listed as a census designated place in the 2010 U.S. census.

Peterman CDP, Alabama – Racial and ethnic composition Note: the US Census treats Hispanic/Latino as an ethnic category. This table excludes Latinos from the racial categories and assigns them to a separate category. Hispanics/Latinos may be of any race.
Race / Ethnicity (NH = Non-Hispanic)	Pop 2010	Pop 2020	% 2010	% 2020
White alone (NH)	77	70	86.52%	80.46%
Black or African American alone (NH)	8	9	8.99%	10.34%
Native American or Alaska Native alone (NH)	1	0	1.12%	0.00%
Asian alone (NH)	0	0	0.00%	0.00%
Native Hawaiian or Pacific Islander alone (NH)	0	0	0.00%	0.00%
Other race alone (NH)	0	0	0.00%	0.00%
Mixed race or Multiracial (NH)	3	7	3.37%	8.05%
Hispanic or Latino (any race)	0	1	0.00%	1.15%
Total	89	87	100.00%	100.00%
