= Peterman, Houston County, Alabama =

Unincorporated community in Alabama, United States

- Unincorporated community
- Location within Alabama Location within the United States
- Coordinates: 31°12′00″N 85°28′45″W
- Country: United States
- State: Alabama
- County: Houston
- Elevation: 308 ft (94 m)
- Time zone: UTC-6 (Central (CST))
  - Summer (DST): UTC-5 (CDT)
- Area code: 334
- GNIS feature ID: 156300

Peterman is an unincorporated community in Houston County, Alabama, United States, located 5.5 miles (8.9 km) west-southwest of downtown Dothan.
