= National Register of Historic Places listings in Monroe County, Alabama =

Location of Monroe County in Alabama

This is a list of the National Register of Historic Places listings in Monroe County, Alabama.

This is intended to be a complete list of the properties and districts on the National Register of Historic Places in Monroe County, Alabama, United States. Latitude and longitude coordinates are provided for many National Register properties and districts; these locations may be seen together in an online map.

There are seven properties and districts listed on the National Register in the county, including one National Historic Landmark.

This National Park Service list is complete through NPS recent listings posted January 16, 2026.

| | Name on the Register | Image | Date listed | Location | City or town | Description |
|---|---|---|---|---|---|---|
| 1 | Dellet Plantation | Dellet Plantation | September 2, 1994 (#93001517) | Along U.S. Route 84 on the western bank of the Alabama River; 31°34′19″N 87°32′39″W | Monroeville | |
| 2 | Lee Family Home | | December 18, 2025 (#100012399) | 219 West Avenue; 31°31′23″N 87°19′53″W | Monroeville | |
| 3 | Monroeville Downtown Historic District | Monroeville Downtown Historic District | September 16, 2009 (#09000606) | Parts of N. and S. Alabama Aves., E. and W. Claiborne St., N. and S. Mount Pleasant Aves., and Pineville Rd. 31°31′36″N 87°19′26″W | Monroeville | |
| 4 | New Hope Baptist Church | New Hope Baptist Church | July 7, 2005 (#05000646) | About 4 miles off County Road 50 near old Natchez; 31°43′42″N 87°15′40″W | Beatrice | |
| 5 | Old Monroe County Courthouse | Old Monroe County Courthouse | April 26, 1973 (#73000366) | Courthouse Sq. 31°31′38″N 87°19′27″W | Monroeville | Designated a National Historic Landmark in 2021 for its literary association with Truman Capote and Harper Lee. |
| 6 | Robbins Hotel | Robbins Hotel | August 26, 1987 (#87000858) | State Route 265; 31°44′09″N 87°12′35″W | Beatrice | Destroyed by fire in 2012. |
| 7 | Vanity Fair Park | | July 23, 2020 (#100005354) | 271 Park Dr. 31°30′56″N 87°20′43″W | Monroeville | |

== See also ==
- List of National Historic Landmarks in Alabama
- National Register of Historic Places listings in Alabama
