= Monroe County High School (Alabama) =

High school in Alabama, United States

Coordinates: 31°29′3.05″N 87°20′2.02″W

Location
- 212 Tiger Drive; Monroeville, (Monroe County), Alabama 73932; United States

Information
- Type: Public high school
- Principal: Maurice Woody
- Staff: 18.50 (FTE)
- Enrollment: 302 (2024-2025)
- Student to teacher ratio: 16.32
- Colors: Navy and gold
- Nickname: Tigers
- Website: Monroe County High School

Monroe County High School is a public high school in Monroeville, Monroe County, Alabama. It is part of the Monroe County School District.

== History ==
Monroe County High School is the successor to a short-lived public school open to both blacks and whites built by the Freedmen's Bureau shortly after the U.S. Civil War, and the Monroeville High School, housed in a small frame building erected by local citizens (on the site of the present day Monroeville Elementary School) in 1895. This building burned in 1903 and was not rebuilt.

In 1907, the State Legislature mandated a public high school in every county seat, stipulating that the value of the building must exceed $5,000, (~$125,957 in 2025) be placed on a lot with a minimum of five acres, and all school properties be deeded to the state. There were no provisions in this bill for the state to furnish any funds, and it was the responsibility of the local citizenry to raise the necessary capital.

Erected on the former site of the defunct Monroeville High School, the original two-story brick building housed grades 7–12. The first Monroe County High School classes were begun in the fall of 1912 (114 years ago), and in that first year there was one graduate, Maybelle Broughton. Congressman John McDuffie delivered the commencement address

This building was used as the high school until a new one was erected on York Street in 1936. At this time, some classes in the elementary school moved into the old facility and occupied the old building until it burned just prior to the opening bell on the morning of November 11, 1946. No students or staff were injured in the blaze.

The second location of Monroe County High School was on York Street until 1978. The school was expanded multiple times to add more instructional space and facilities to the original two story building and gymnasium. After a new high school was built on Tiger Drive, the old high school was converted to Monroeville Junior High School. It is still in use as a junior high school for 6th through 8th grades.

== Notable alumni ==
- Chris Booker, former MLB player
- Tytus Howard, NFL offensive tackle
- Harper Lee, author of To Kill a Mockingbird
