= Vocation (disambiguation) =

A vocation is an occupation to which a person is specially drawn or for which she/he is suited, trained, or qualified.

Vocation(s) may also refer to:

- Vocation, Alabama, a community in the United States
- "Vocation" (poem), a poem by Rabindranath Tagore
- Vocations, a play by Alma De Groen
