= Old Texas, Alabama =

- Unincorporated community
- Location within Alabama Location within the United States
- Coordinates: 31°46′11″N 87°00′01″W
- Country: United States
- State: Alabama
- County: Monroe
- Elevation: 430 ft (130 m)
- Time zone: UTC-6 (Central (CST))
  - Summer (DST): UTC-5 (CDT)
- Area code: 251
- GNIS feature ID: 136590

Old Texas is an unincorporated community in Monroe County, Alabama, United States. Old Texas is located on Alabama State Route 47, 12.3 miles (19.8 km) east-northeast of Beatrice.

== History ==
A post office called Old Texas was established in 1857, and remained in operation until it was discontinued in 1866. The community was named by pioneers from eastern states who passed through here on their way to Texas, and decided instead to stay.
