= Nadawah, Alabama =

- Ghost town
- Location within Alabama Location within the United States
- Coordinates: 31.81431°N 87.17220°W
- Country: United States
- State: Alabama
- County: Monroe
- Elevation: 194 ft (59 m)
- Time zone: UTC-6 (Central (CST))
  - Summer (DST): UTC-5 (CDT)
- ZIP code: 36768
- Area code: 251

Nadawah is a ghost town in Monroe County, Alabama.

== History ==
Nadawah was named for the Nadawah Lumber Company. The Nadawah Lumber Company operated 15 miles of standard-gauge railway from 1912 to 1928. Nadawah was formerly a sawmill town in the early 20th century, located about a mile south of Wilcox County and seven miles from Beatrice. The town was near the head of Flat Creek, along the Louisville & Nashville Railroad (L&N). Besides the sawmill, it had a post office, school, hotel and stores. A post office operated under the name Nadawah from 1900 to 1967. Little exists of the community today.

== Demographics ==
Historical population
Census	Pop.	Note	%±
1920	373		—
1930	93		−75.1%
U.S. Decennial Census

Nadawah appeared on the U.S. Censuses of 1920 and 1930 as an incorporated community. It disincorporated at some point in the 1930s.

== Geography ==
Nadawah is located at 31.8143197°N 87.1722083°W and has an elevation of 194 feet (59 m).
