= Robert Tait Ervin =

American judge

Senior Judge of the United States District Court for the Southern District of Alabama
- In office January 23, 1935 – October 24, 1949

Judge of the United States District Court for the Southern District of Alabama
- In office January 23, 1917 – January 23, 1935
- Appointed by: Woodrow Wilson
- Preceded by: Harry Theophilus Toulmin
- Succeeded by: John McDuffie

Personal details
- Born: Robert Tait Ervin; May 27, 1863 Wilcox County, Alabama, C.S.
- Died: October 24, 1949 (aged 86) U.S.
- Education: University of Alabama School of Law (LL.B.)

Robert Tait Ervin (May 27, 1863 – October 24, 1949) was an Alabama lawyer who became United States district judge of the United States District Court for the Southern District of Alabama.

== Early life and education ==
Born at the Tait-Ervin House in Camden, Wilcox County, Alabama in 1863 to the former Sarah Asbury Tait and her husband, prominent planter Dr. Robert Hugh Ervin. Robert was the youngest in a large family, with at least three brothers and five sisters. His father was a Confederate cavalry officer and represented Dallas and Wilcox counties in the Alabama legislature during the American Civil War, rising to president pro tem of the Alabama senate by 1872. His grandfather Charles Tait represented Georgia in the U.S. Senate before becoming a federal judge for Alabama. Ervin received a Bachelor of Laws from the University of Alabama School of Law in 1887.

== Career ==
Following admission to the Alabama bar, Ervin had a private legal practice in Mobile, Alabama from 1887 to 1917. During that time, he served as a Referee in Bankruptcy for the United States District Court for the Southern District of Alabama.

== Federal judicial service ==
On January 16, 1917, Ervin was nominated by President Woodrow Wilson to a seat on the United States District Court for the Southern District of Alabama vacated by Judge Harry Theophilus Toulmin. The United States Senate confirmed him on January 23, 1917, and Judge Ervin received his commission the same day.

During Prohibition, the U.S. Department of Justice investigated bootlegging in Mobile, based on an attempt by entrepreneur (and later long-serving Congressman) Frank Boykin to bribe U.S. Attorney Aubrey Broyles, who had vowed to clean up the port city. Ervin presided over 71 of the 117 cases in 1923-1925, which divided the city and became known as the "whisky trials". When Broyles recused himself following defense accusations that he had asked for bribes, U.S. Attorney General (and future U.S. Supreme Court justice) Harlan Fiske Stone and his assistant Mabel Walker Willebrandt appointed Jefferson county prosecutor (and future U.S. Supreme Court justice) Hugo Black and Mobile lawyer Nicholas Stallworth as special prosecutors. Ervin dismissed charges against 18 defendants, including Boykin, ruling his correspondence with members of the Harding administration inadmissible as evidence. Eleven of the conspirators were ultimately convicted, including the Democratic Executive Committee chairman John McEvoy and Mobile's police chief O'Shaunessey. He recused himself from the retrials, and many of the convicted defendants were later pardoned by President Calvin Coolidge.

Judge Ervin assumed senior status on January 23, 1935, serving in that capacity until his death on October 24, 1949.

== Personal life ==
Judge Ervin married Francis Patterson Pybas (1871-1962). Their son Robert Tait Ervin Jr. followed family traditions of legal and military service. Enlisting in the Alabama National Guard in 1926, he rose to the rank of colonel during his service in World War II and earned a Bronze Star. He also became a lawyer and assistant prosecutor, and in 1954 (after his father's death) became a state circuit judge and later president of the Alabama Circuit Judges Association.

== Sources ==
Legal offices
Preceded by Harry Theophilus Toulmin	Judge of the United States District Court for the Southern District of Alabama; 1917–1935	Succeeded by John McDuffie
