= Goodway, Alabama =

- Unincorporated community
- Location within Alabama Location within the United States
- Coordinates: 31°20′13″N 87°25′33″W
- Country: United States
- State: Alabama
- County: Monroe
- Elevation: 381 ft (116 m)
- Time zone: UTC-6 (Central (CST))
  - Summer (DST): UTC-5 (CDT)
- ZIP code: 36449
- Area code: 251
- GNIS feature ID: 119153

Goodway is an unincorporated community in Monroe County, Alabama, United States. Goodway is located along the Alabama and Gulf Coast Railway, 6.8 miles (10.9 km) south of Frisco City. Goodway had a post office until it closed on December 31, 1988; it still has its own ZIP code, 36449.
