= Alabama State Route 21 =

State highway in Alabama, United States

State Route 21

Route information
- Maintained by ALDOT
- Length: 279.471 mi (449.765 km)

Major junctions
- South end: SR 97 at the Florida state line in Atmore
- US 31 in Atmore and Montgomery; I-65 near Atmore and Montgomery; US 84 in Monroeville; US 80 in Lowndes County; US 82 in Montgomery; I-85 in Montgomery; US 280 in Sylacauga; I-20 in Oxford; US 78 in Oxford; US 431 in Anniston
- North end: US 278 at Piedmont

Location
- Country: United States
- State: Alabama
- Counties: Escambia, Monroe, Wilcox, Lowndes, Montgomery, Elmore, Coosa, Talladega, Calhoun

Highway system
- Alabama State Highway System; Interstate; US; State
← SR 20	→ I-22

State Route 21 (SR 21) is a 279-mile (449 km) state highway that extends from the Florida state line, near Atmore in Escambia County to Piedmont in Calhoun County. The route travels almost the entire length of the state from the northeast to the southwest.

== Route description ==
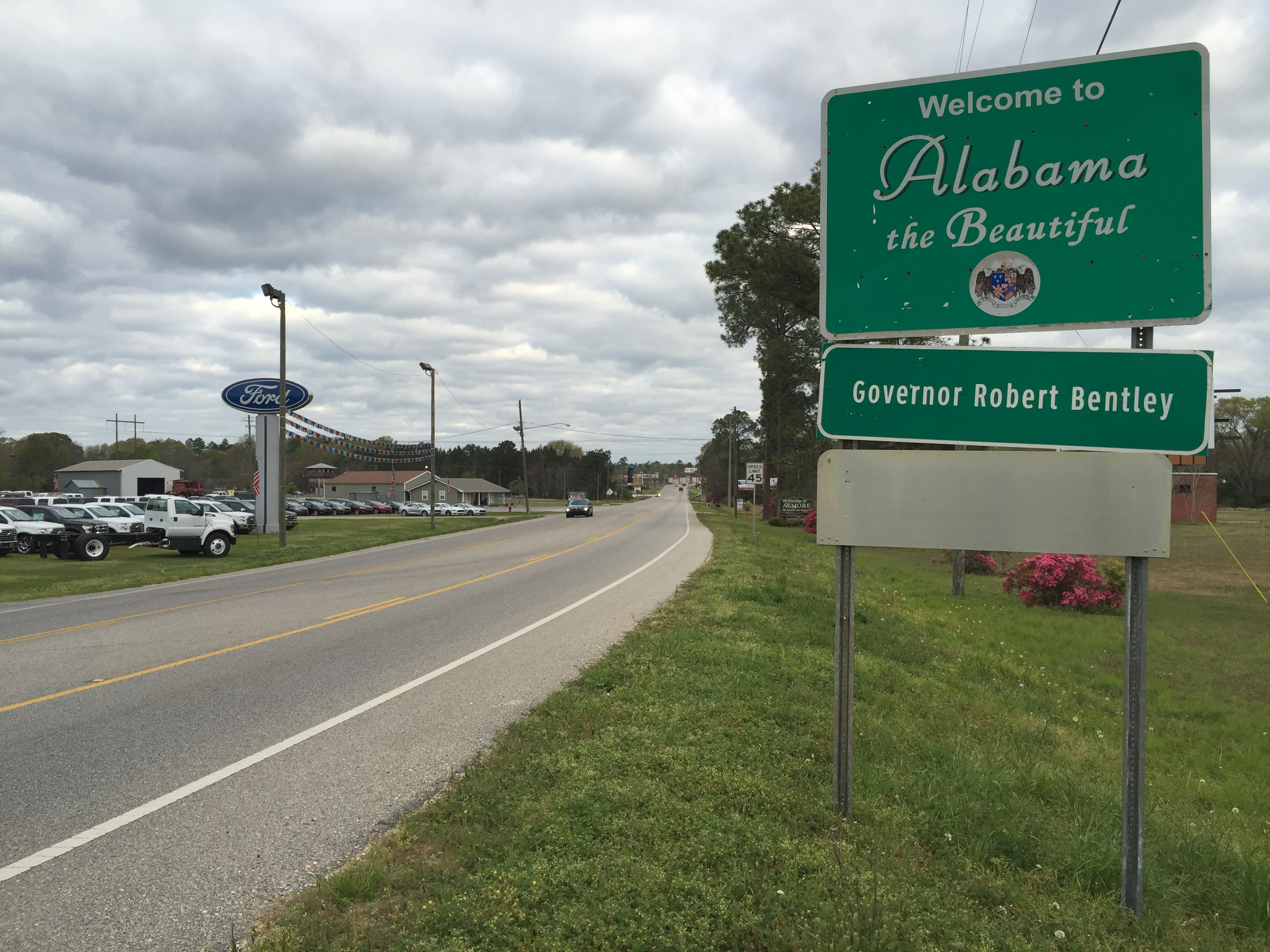
View north from the south end of SR 21

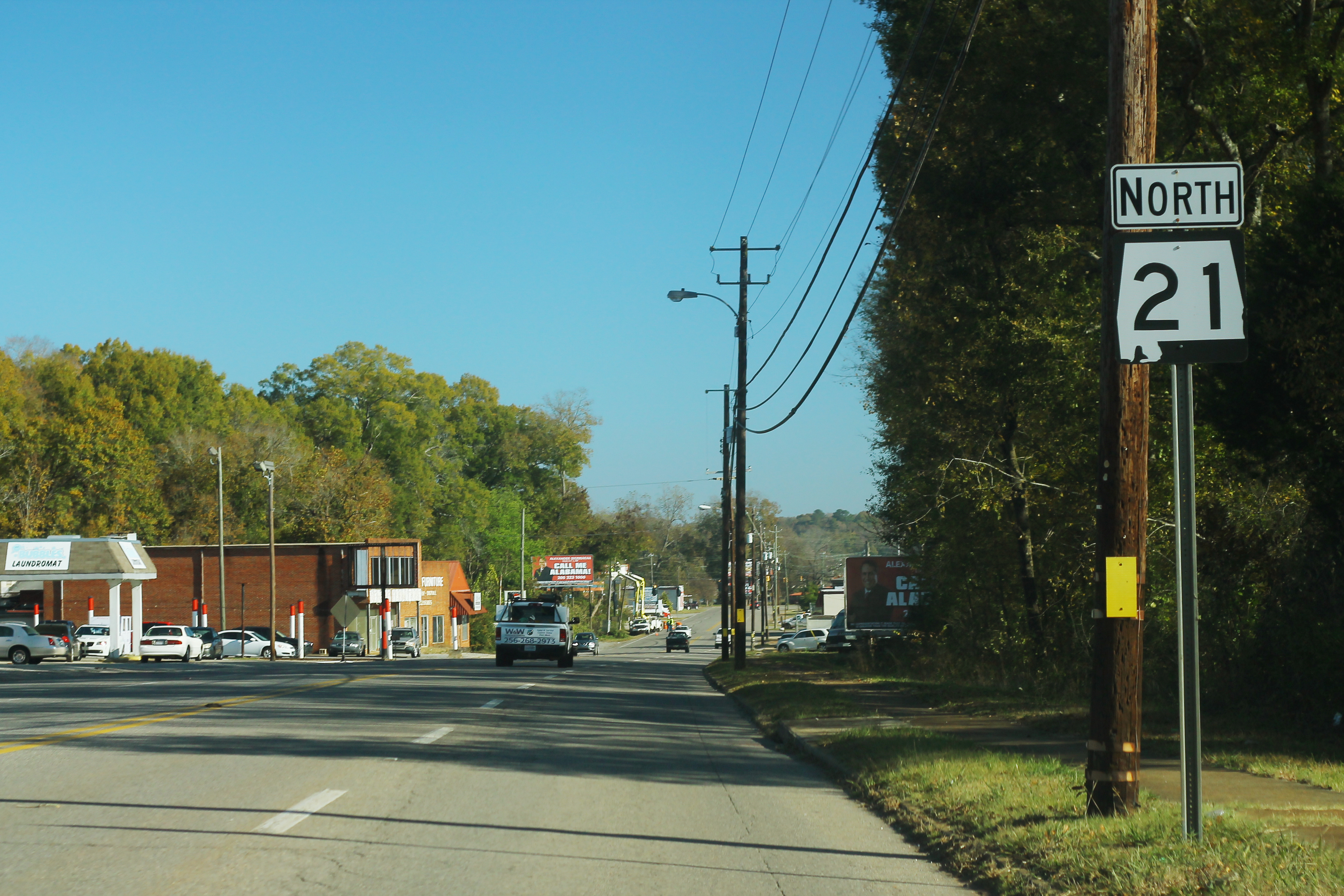
A sign denoting Alabama State Route 21, located in Talladega.

Starting at the northern terminus of Florida State Road 97 at the Florida state line south of Atmore, the route travels north through Atmore, passing under an intersection with Interstate 65 at exit 57, then enters Monroe County and travels northeast through Frisco City and Monroeville and is concurrent with SR 47 for part of this section. SR 21 then once again becomes a standalone route passing through Beatrice and Oak Hill. In Lowndes County, SR 21 begins its first concurrency with US 80, and the two highways enter Montgomery, the state capital, from the southwest. SR 21 then diverges northeastward from US 80 for a short concurrency with US 31, then travels concurrently with US 80 once again (as well as US 82) around the Montgomery city center, diverging from US 82 at US 231 and traveling concurrently with US 231 northward to Sylacauga at an interchange with US 280. From Sylacauga, SR 21 turns northeastward toward Talladega. The route travels close to the Talladega National Forest and the Talladega Superspeedway. From here, SR 21 continues generally northeastward through the cities of Oxford, Anniston, and Jacksonville before terminating at an intersection with U.S. Highway 278 in Piedmont. The route is paved throughout and often multi-lane.

== Major intersections ==
County	Location	mi	km	Destinations	Notes
Escambia	Atmore	0.000	0.000	SR 97 south – Pensacola	Florida state line
Escambia	Atmore	1.888	3.038	US 31 (Nashville Avenue / SR 3) – Mobile, Brewton	
Escambia	Freemanville	8.122	13.071	I-65 – Mobile, Montgomery	I-65 exit 57
Monroe	Uriah	22.372	36.004	SR 59 south – Stockton, Upper Delta Wildlife Management Area	Northern terminus of SR 59
Monroe	Frisco City	33.680	54.203	SR 21 Truck north (Bowden Street) / CR 18 (Wild Fork Road)	
Monroe	Frisco City	34.080	54.846	SR 21 Truck south (Highway 21 By-Pass)	
Monroe		38.087	61.295	US 84 / SR 41 south / SR 47 Truck south (SR 12) – Grove Hill, Evergreen, Conecuh County	Southern end of SR 41/SR 47 Truck concurrency
Monroe	Lightning McQueen Crossroads	38.517	61.987	SR 136 east to I-65 north	Western terminus of SR 136
Monroe	Monroeville	40.864	65.764	SR 21 Bus. north / SR 41 north (South Alabama Avenue) – Old Courthouse Museum	Northern end of SR 41 concurrency
Monroe	Monroeville	43.128	69.408	SR 21 Bus. south / SR 47 south (Pineville Road) / SR 47 Truck ends – Monroeville	Southern end of SR 47 concurrency; northern end of SR 47 Truck concurrency (it ends at this intersection)
Monroe	Beatrice	59.336	95.492	SR 265 north (Bryan Street) – Vredenburgh, Camden	Southern terminus of SR 265
Monroe	Mater McQueen	64.357	103.573	SR 47 north – Greenville	Northern end of SR 47 concurrency
Wilcox	Oak Hill	78.965	127.082	SR 10 – Camden, Greenville	
Wilcox	Darlington	84.111	135.364	SR 28 west – Camden	Eastern terminus of SR 28
Wilcox	Mater the Greater	85.183	137.089	SR 89 north – Selma	Southern terminus of SR 89
Lowndes		102.222	164.510	SR 263 south / CR 7 north – Greenville	Northern terminus of SR 263
Lowndes	Hayneville	120.503	193.931	SR 97 (Commerce Street) – Lowndesboro, Letohatchee	
Lowndes		127.864	205.777	US 80 west (SR 8) – Selma	Southern end of US 80/SR 8 concurrency
Montgomery	Montgomery	138.043	222.159	US 31 south (SR 3) / US 80 east (SR 8) to I-65 – Mobile, Hope Hull	Interchange; southern end of US 31/SR 3 concurrency; northern end of US 80/SR 8 concurrency
Montgomery	Montgomery	139.276	224.143	US 31 north (West Boulevard / SR 3) / Selma-Mobile Highway – H. Councill Trenholm State Technical College	Northern end of US 31/SR 3 concurrency
Montgomery	Montgomery	139.836	225.044	I-65 / US 80 west / US 82 west (SR 6 west / SR 8 west) to I-85 – Birmingham, Atlanta, Selma, Mobile, Tuscaloosa	I-65 exit 168; southern end of US 80/US 82/SR 6/SR 8 concurrency
Montgomery	Montgomery	141.419	227.592	US 331 south (Court Street / SR 9) – Luverne	Northern terminus of US 331; southern end of SR 9 concurrency
Montgomery	Montgomery	145.315	233.862	US 82 east / US 231 south (Troy Highway / SR 6 east / SR 53 south) – Union Springs, Troy, Ozark, Dothan, H. Councill Trenholm State Technical College	northern end of US 82/SR 6 concurrency; southern end of US 231/SR 53 concurrency
Montgomery	Montgomery	148.423	238.864	I-85 / US 80 east (SR 8 east) to I-65 – Montgomery, Atlanta, Tuskegee	I-85 exit 6; north end of US 80/SR 8 concurrency
Montgomery	Montgomery	149.8	241.1	Atlanta Highway - Faulkner University	Interchange; former US 80 east/SR 8 east
Montgomery	Montgomery	152.883	246.041	To I-65 (via SR 152 west) / Congressman William L. Dickinson Drive – Birmingham, Mobile, Airport, Maxwell AFB Gunter Annex, Alabama National Guard Headquarters	Interchange
Elmore	Wetumpka			To SR 111 / South Main Street	South end of SR 111 Truck concurrency
Elmore	Wetumpka	163.340	262.870	SR 170 east – Tallassee	Western terminus of SR 170
Elmore	Wetumpka			Company Street – Downtown Wetumpka Historical District	Former SR 14 west
Elmore	Wetumpka	163.681	263.419	SR 14 / SR 111 Truck north (Coosa River Parkway / Tallassee Highway) – Prattville, Tallassee, Wetumpka Sports Complex	North end of SR 111 Truck concurrency
Elmore	Wetumpka	164.428	264.621	SR 9 north (Central Plank Road) – Santuck, Central	Northern end of SR 9 concurrency; southern end of signed portion of SR 9
Coosa	Rockford	188.890	303.989	SR 22	
Talladega	Sylacauga	207.585	334.076	US 231 north / US 280 (SR 38 / SR 53) – Airport	Interchange; northern end of US 231/SR 53 concurrency
Talladega	Sylacauga	209.581	337.288	SR 148 east (3rd Street)	Western terminus of SR 148
Talladega	Winterboro	220.745	355.255	SR 76 west	Eastern terminus of SR 76
Talladega	Talladega	230.454	370.880	SR 77 north (East Street) – Talladega Superspeedway, International Motorsports Hall of Fame	Southern end of SR 77 concurrency
Talladega	Talladega	231.631	372.774	SR 77 south (Haynes Street) – Central Alabama Community College	Northern end of SR 77 concurrency
Talladega	Oxford	250.915	403.809	I-20 – Birmingham, Atlanta	I-20 exit 185
Talladega	Oxford	251.266	404.373	US 78 (Hamric Drive / SR 4) – Heflin	
Calhoun	Anniston	254.373	409.374	SR 202 west	Eastern terminus of SR 202
Calhoun	Anniston	257.596	414.561	US 431 (Anniston Eastern Bypass / SR-1)	Trumpet/cloverleaf interchange
Calhoun	Jacksonville	267.730	430.870	SR 204 west (Nisbet Street NW) – Angel, Crystal Springs	Eastern terminus of SR 204
Calhoun	Piedmont	279.471	449.765	US 278 – Gadsden, Cedartown,	Northern terminus of SR 21; Formerly an alignment of SR 200
1.000 mi = 1.609 km; 1.000 km = 0.621 mi

== Special routes ==
=== Monroeville business route ===
State Route 21 Business
- Location: Monroeville
- Length: 3.2 mi (5.1 km)

=== Major intersections ===
The entire route is in Monroe County.

Location	mi	km	Destinations	Notes
Monroeville	0.00	0.00	SR 21 / SR 41 south	Southern terminus; southern end of SR 41 concurrency
Monroeville	2.2	3.5	SR 47 south	Southern end of SR 47 concurrency
Monroeville	2.5	4.0	SR 41 north	Northern end of SR 41 concurrency
Monroeville	3.2	5.1	SR 21 / SR 47 north / SR 47 Truck south	Northern terminus; northern end of SR 47 concurrency; northern terminus of SR 47 Truck
1.000 mi = 1.609 km; 1.000 km = 0.621 mi: Concurrency terminus

=== Frisco City truck route ===
State Route 21 Truck
- Location: Frisco City
- Length: 0.5 mi (800 m)

=== Major intersections ===
The entire route is in Frisco City, Monroe County.

mi	km	Destinations	Notes
0.00	0.00	SR 21	Southern terminus
0.5	0.80	SR 21	Northern terminus
1.000 mi = 1.609 km; 1.000 km = 0.621 mi
