= Megargel, Alabama =

- Census-designated place
- Location in Monroe County, Alabama
- Coordinates: 31°22′31″N 87°25′54″W
- Country: United States
- State: Alabama
- County: Monroe

Area
  - Total: 0.69 sq mi (1.78 km^{2})
  - Land: 0.69 sq mi (1.78 km^{2})
  - Water: 0 sq mi (0.00 km^{2})
- Elevation: 384 ft (117 m)

Population (2020)
  - Total: 60
  - Density: 87.2/sq mi (33.67/km^{2})
- Time zone: UTC-6 (Central (CST))
  - Summer (DST): UTC-5 (CDT)
- Area code: 251
- GNIS feature ID: 2628598
- FIPS code: 01-47848

Megargel is a census-designated place and unincorporated community in Monroe County, Alabama, United States. Its population was 60 as of the 2020 census.

== Demographics ==
Historical population
Census	Pop.	Note	%±
2010	62		—
2020	60		−3.2%
U.S. Decennial Census

Megargel was listed as a census designated place in the 2010 U.S. census.

Megargel CDP, Alabama – Racial and ethnic composition Note: the US Census treats Hispanic/Latino as an ethnic category. This table excludes Latinos from the racial categories and assigns them to a separate category. Hispanics/Latinos may be of any race.
Race / Ethnicity (NH = Non-Hispanic)	Pop 2010	Pop 2020	% 2010	% 2020
White alone (NH)	57	52	91.94%	86.67%
Black or African American alone (NH)	2	2	3.23%	3.33%
Native American or Alaska Native alone (NH)	2	0	3.23%	0.00%
Asian alone (NH)	0	0	0.00%	0.00%
Native Hawaiian or Pacific Islander alone (NH)	0	0	0.00%	0.00%
Other race alone (NH)	0	1	0.00%	1.67%
Mixed race or Multiracial (NH)	1	4	1.61%	6.67%
Hispanic or Latino (any race)	0	1	0.00%	1.67%
Total	62	60	100.00%	100.00%

== History ==
This rural area was a center of cotton production into the early 20th century.

The community was named for Roy Megargel, who was the owner of the Gulf, Florida, and Alabama Railroad (GFA) in the early part of the 20th century. He initially got the town of Jones Mill (known today as Frisco City) to agree to change their name to Roy in 1913 on the condition he construct a rail line to the town. When he failed to do so, the town reverted to its old name in 1919.

== Climate ==
Climate is characterized by relatively high temperatures and evenly distributed precipitation throughout the year. The Köppen Climate Classification sub-type for this climate is "Cfa" (Humid Subtropical Climate).

Climate data for Megargel, Alabama
Month	Jan	Feb	Mar	Apr	May	Jun	Jul	Aug	Sep	Oct	Nov	Dec	Year
Mean daily maximum °C (°F)	15 (59)	17 (63)	21 (70)	25 (77)	29 (85)	32 (89)	33 (91)	33 (91)	31 (87)	26 (79)	21 (69)	16 (61)	25 (77)
Mean daily minimum °C (°F)	3 (38)	4 (40)	8 (46)	12 (53)	16 (61)	19 (67)	21 (70)	21 (69)	18 (65)	12 (54)	7 (44)	4 (39)	12 (54)
Average precipitation mm (inches)	130 (5.2)	130 (5.2)	170 (6.5)	130 (5.1)	120 (4.7)	130 (5.2)	150 (6.1)	130 (5)	120 (4.6)	69 (2.7)	110 (4.3)	130 (5.2)	1,520 (59.9)
Source: Weatherbase
