= Alabama State Route 83 =

State highway in Alabama, United States

State Route 83

Route information
- Maintained by ALDOT
- Length: 24.274 mi (39.065 km)

Major junctions
- South end: US 31 / US 84 in Evergreen
- I-65 in Evergreen
- North end: SR 47 in Midway

Location
- Country: United States
- State: Alabama
- Counties: Conecuh, Monroe

Highway system
- Alabama State Highway System; Interstate; US; State
← US 82	→ US 84

State Route 83 (SR 83) is a 24-mile-long (39 km) state highway in Conecuh and Monroe counties in the southern part of the U.S. state of Alabama. The southern terminus of the highway is at an intersection with US 31/US 84 in Evergreen. The northern terminus of the highway is at an intersection with SR 47 at the unincorporated community of Midway in Monroe County.

== Route description ==
SR 83 heads northward from Evergreen along a two-lane road. Just north of the city, the highway has an interchange with Interstate 65 (I-65), offering motorists in the area direct access to Mobile to the southwest and Montgomery and Birmingham to the north. North of the interchange with I-65, SR 83 travels through rural areas, serving only the unincorporated communities of Lyeffion and Midway before reaching its northern terminus in eastern Monroe County.

== Major intersections ==
County	Location	mi	km	Destinations	Notes
Conecuh	Evergreen	0.000	0.000	US 31 / US 84 (West Front Street / SR 3 / SR 12) – Andalusia, McKenzie, Brewton	Southern terminus
Conecuh	Evergreen	2.093	3.368	I-65 – Mobile, Montgomery, Greenville	I-65 exit 96
Monroe	Midway	24.274	39.065	SR 47 – Monroeville, Greenville	Northern terminus
1.000 mi = 1.609 km; 1.000 km = 0.621 mi

== Gallery ==
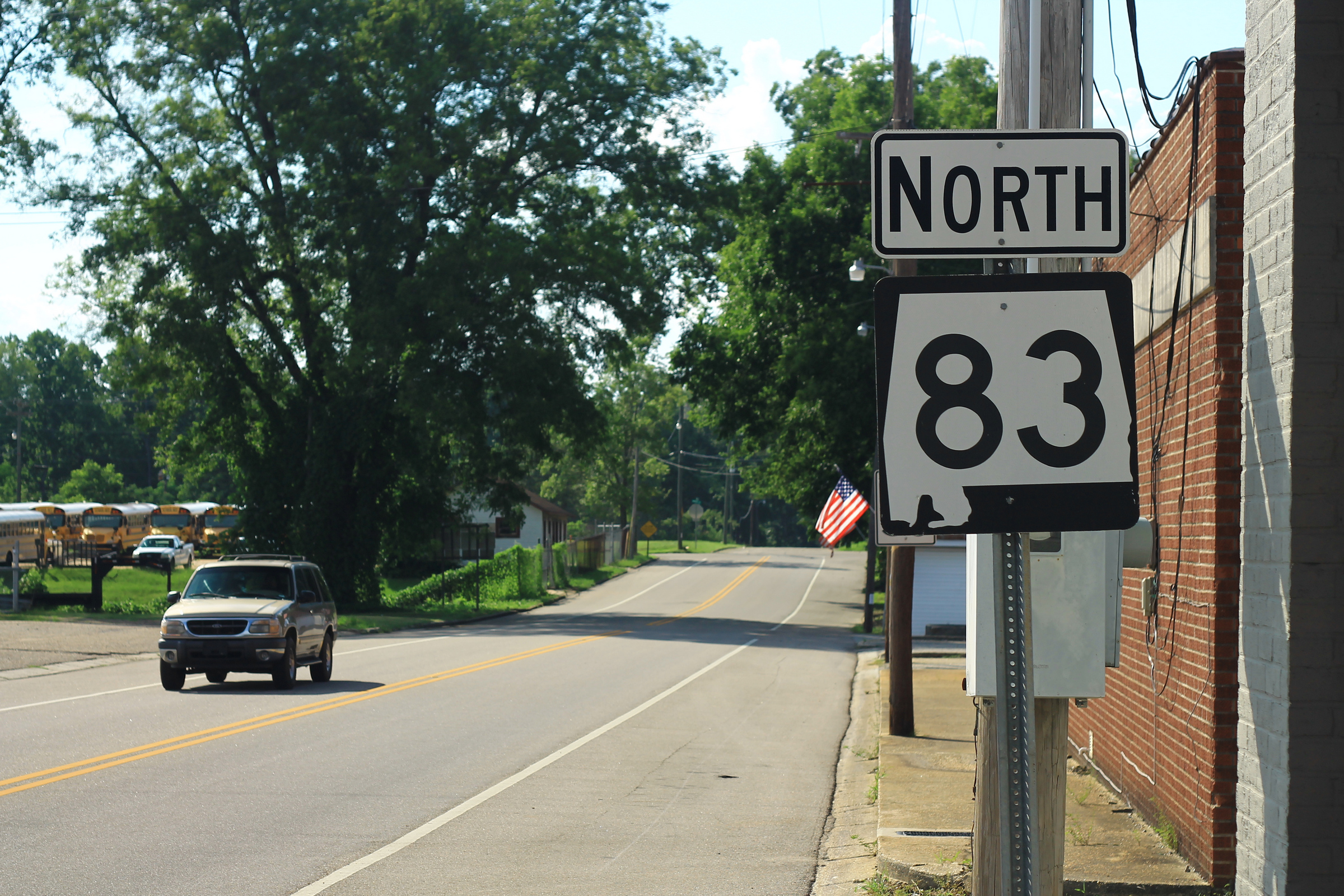
Northbound reassurance marker in Evergreen

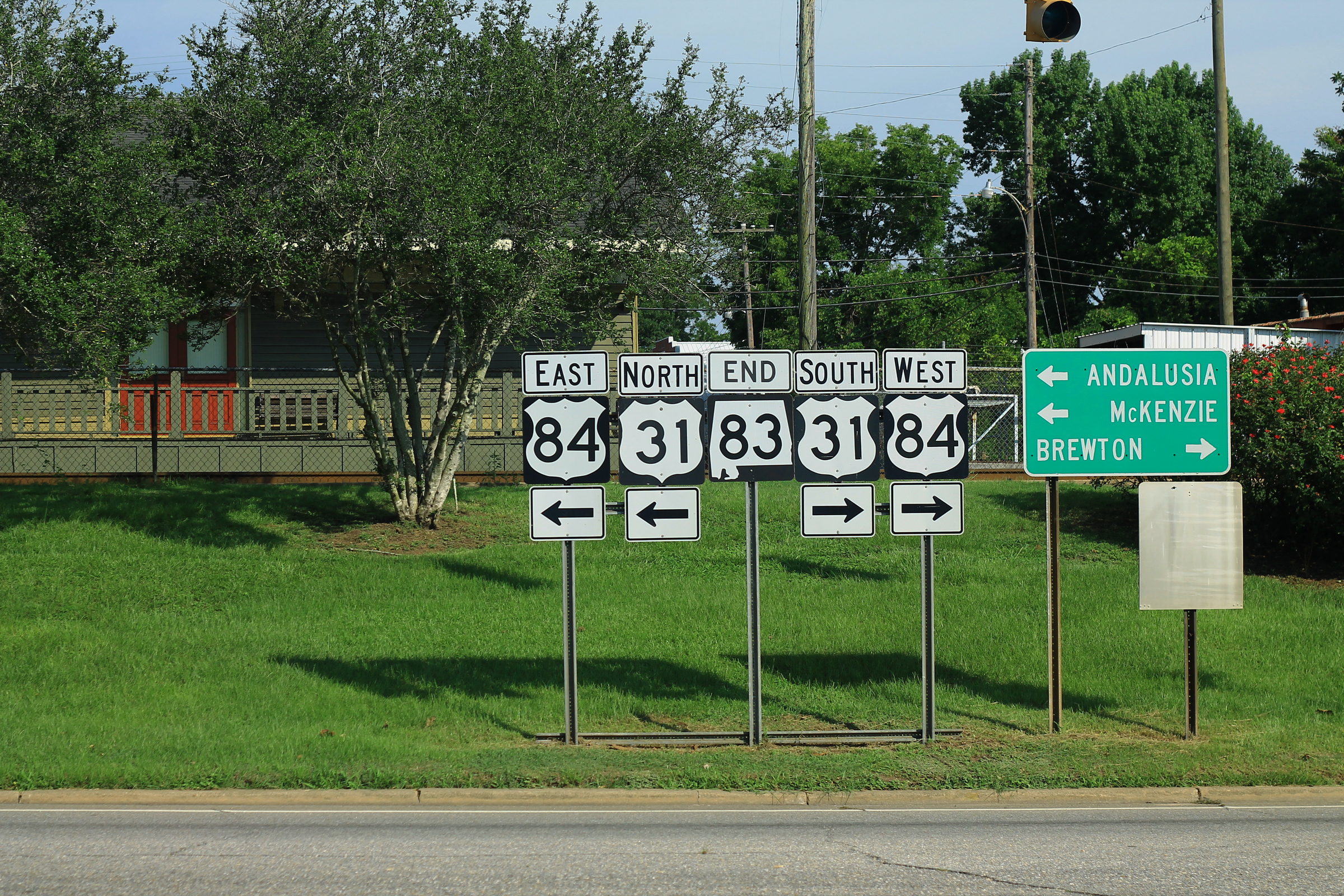
Signage at southern terminus in Evergreen
