= John McDuffie =

American judge and politician (1883–1950)

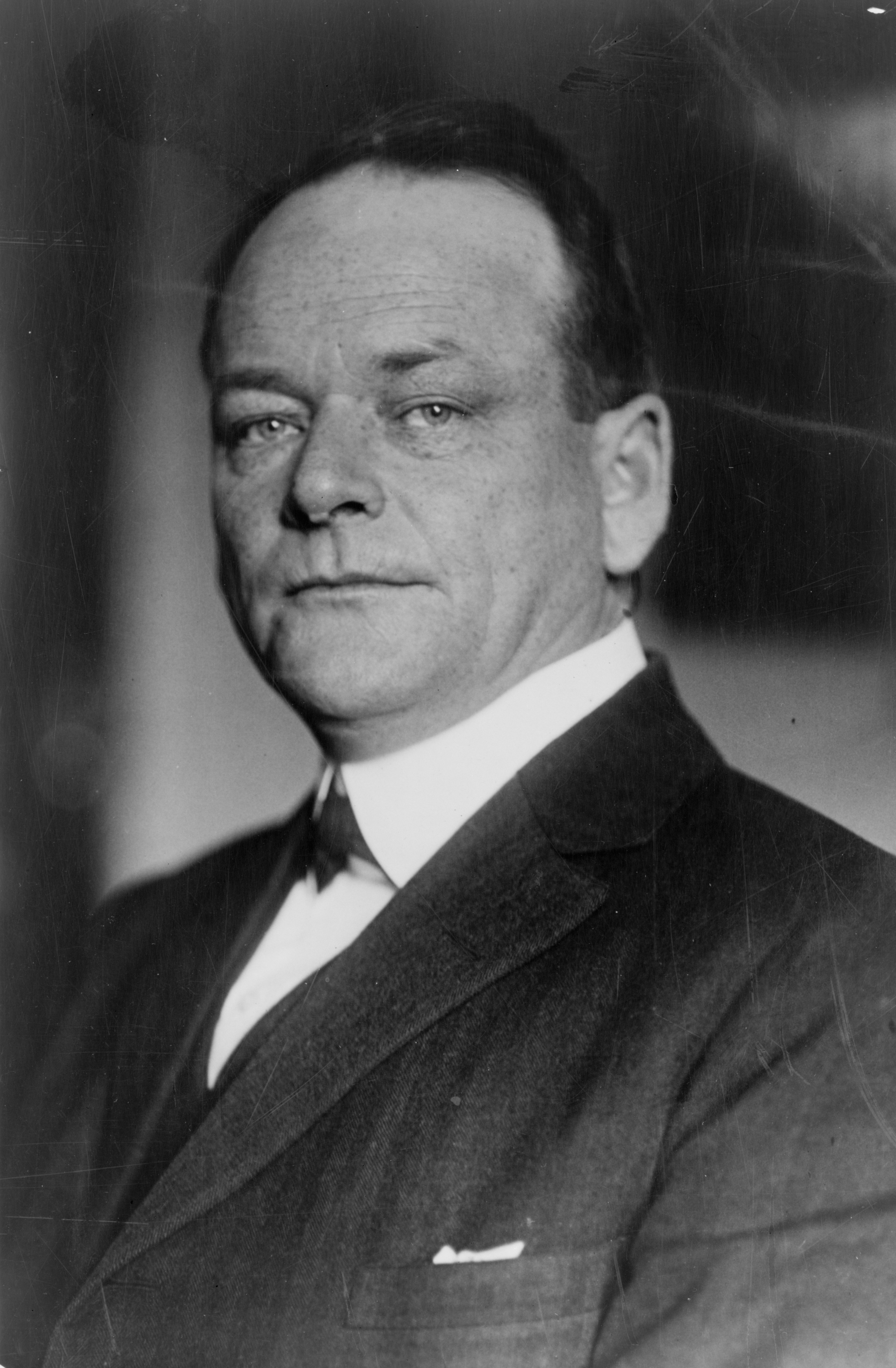
- McDuffie, 1920s

Judge of the United States District Court for the Southern District of Alabama
- In office February 8, 1935 – November 1, 1950
- Appointed by: Franklin D. Roosevelt
- Preceded by: Robert Tait Ervin
- Succeeded by: Daniel Holcombe Thomas

Member of the U.S. House of Representatives from Alabama's 1st district
- In office March 4, 1919 – March 2, 1935
- Preceded by: Oscar Lee Gray
- Succeeded by: Frank W. Boykin

Member of the Alabama House of Representatives
- In office 1907-1911

Personal details
- Born: September 25, 1883 River Ridge, Alabama, U.S.
- Died: November 1, 1950 (aged 67) Mobile, Alabama, U.S.
- Resting place: Pine Crest Cemetery; Mobile, Alabama
- Party: Democratic
- Education: Auburn University (B.Sc.); University of Alabama (LL.B.)

John McDuffie (September 25, 1883 – November 1, 1950) was a United States representative from Alabama and a United States district judge of the United States District Court for the Southern District of Alabama.

== Education and career ==
Born on September 25, 1883, in River Ridge, Monroe County, Alabama, McDuffie was educated by private tutors. He attended college at Southern University (now Birmingham–Southern College) in Greensboro and later attended Alabama Polytechnic Institute (now Auburn University) in Auburn, Alabama, where he in graduated with a Bachelor of Science degree in 1904. McDuffie received a Bachelor of Laws from the University of Alabama School of Law in 1908. He was admitted to the bar the same year. A Democrat, he was elected to the Alabama House of Representatives in 1907 and served until 1911. McDuffie was in private practice of law in Monroeville, Alabama from 1911 to 1919. He later became a prosecutor for the First Judicial Circuit Court of Alabama and served there until 1919.

== Congressional service ==
McDuffie was elected to the United States House of Representatives in 1918, and served from March 4, 1919, until his resignation on March 2, 1935. During his tenure in the House he served as Minority Whip for 71st Congress, and later as Majority Whip for 72nd Congress. He also served as Chairman of the United States House Committee on Insular Affairs in 73rd and 74th Congress. He co-authored the Philippine Independence Act which provided for self-government of the Philippines and for Filipino independence from the United States after a period of ten years.

== Federal judicial service ==
McDuffie was nominated by President Franklin D. Roosevelt on January 31, 1935, to a seat on the United States District Court for the Southern District of Alabama vacated by Judge Robert Tait Ervin. He was confirmed by the United States Senate on February 7, 1935, and received his commission on February 8, 1935. His service terminated on November 1, 1950, due to his death in Mobile, Alabama. He was interred in Pine Crest Cemetery in Mobile.

== Sources ==
- United States Congress. "John McDuffie (id: M000427)". Biographical Directory of the United States Congress.

U.S. House of Representatives
Preceded by Oscar Lee Gray	Member of the U.S. House of Representatives from Alabama's 1st congressional district 1919–1935	Succeeded by Frank W. Boykin
Party political offices
Preceded by William Allan Oldfield (D-AR)	House Minority Whip; 1929–1931	Succeeded by Carl G. Bachmann (R-WV)
Preceded by Albert Henry Vestal (R-IN)	House Majority Whip; 1931–1933	Succeeded by Arthur H. Greenwood (D-IN)
Preceded by William Allan Oldfield (AR)	House Democratic Whip; 1929–1933	Succeeded by Arthur H. Greenwood (IN)
Legal offices
Preceded by Robert Tait Ervin	Judge of the United States District Court for the Southern District of Alabama; 1935–1950	Succeeded by Daniel Holcombe Thomas
