= New Hope Baptist Church (Beatrice, Alabama) =

Historic church in Alabama, United States

- U.S. National Register of Historic Places
- Alabama Register of Landmarks and Heritage
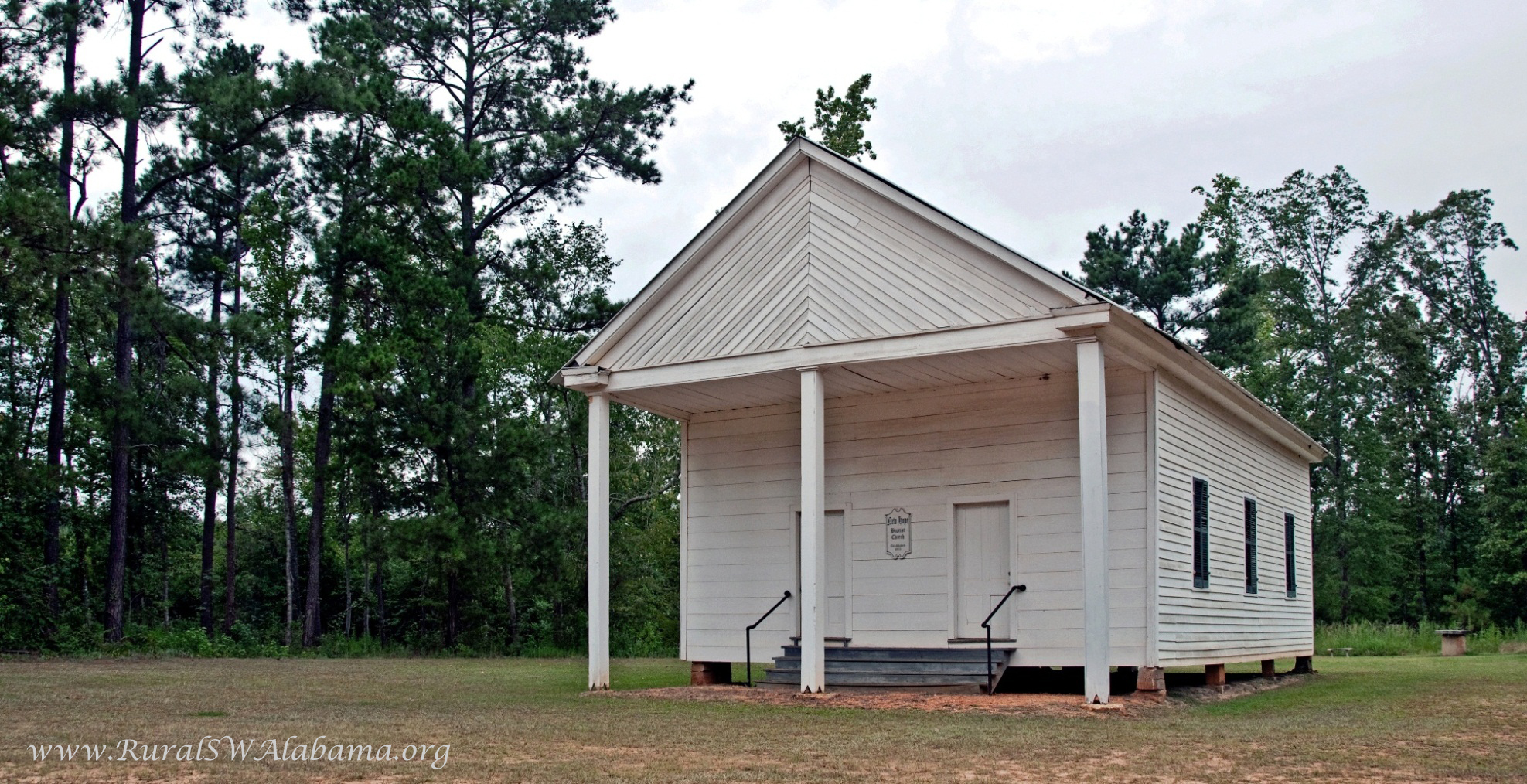

- Location within Alabama Location within the United States
- Nearest city: Beatrice, Alabama
- Coordinates: 31°43′42″N 87°15′40″W
- Area: 4 acres (1.6 ha)
- Built: 1870
- Architectural style: Greek Revival
- NRHP reference No.: 05000646

Significant dates
- Added to NRHP: July 7, 2005
- Designated ARLH: February 4, 2000

New Hope Baptist Church is a historic church located four miles west of Beatrice, Alabama in the unincorporated community of Natchez. The Greek Revival building was built in 1870. It was added to the Alabama Register of Landmarks and Heritage on February 4, 2000, and the National Register of Historic Places on July 7, 2005.
