= Old Salem, Alabama =

- Unincorporated community
- Location within Alabama Location within the United States
- Coordinates: 31°32′23″N 87°24′22″W
- Country: United States
- State: Alabama
- County: Monroe
- Elevation: 381 ft (116 m)
- Time zone: UTC-6 (Central (CST))
  - Summer (DST): UTC-5 (CDT)
- Area code: 251
- GNIS feature ID: 1730579

Old Salem is an unincorporated community in Monroe County, Alabama, United States.
