= Harry Theophilus Toulmin =

American judge

Judge of the United States District Court for the Southern District of Alabama
- In office January 13, 1887 – November 12, 1916
- Appointed by: Grover Cleveland
- Preceded by: Seat established by 24 Stat. 213
- Succeeded by: Robert Tait Ervin

Member of the Alabama House of Representatives
- In office 1870-1872

Personal details
- Born: Harry Theophilus Toulmin; March 4, 1838 Mobile County, Alabama
- Died: November 12, 1916 (aged 78) Toulminville, Alabama
- Education: read law

Harry Theophilus Toulmin (March 4, 1838 – November 12, 1916) was a United States district judge of the United States District Court for the Southern District of Alabama.

== Education and career ==
Born in Mobile County, Alabama, Toulmin read law to enter the bar in 1860. He was in private practice in Mobile, Alabama in 1860. He was a Confederate States Army Colonel from 1861 to 1865, then resumed private practice in Mobile. He was a member of the Alabama House of Representatives from 1870 to 1872. He was a Judge of the 6th Judicial Circuit of Alabama from 1874 to 1880, then a Judge of the 1st Judicial Circuit of Alabama from 1880 to 1882, the change due to realignment of the circuits.

== Federal judicial service ==
Toulmin was nominated by President Grover Cleveland on December 13, 1886, to the United States District Court for the Southern District of Alabama, to a new seat authorized by 24 Stat. 213. He was confirmed by the United States Senate on January 13, 1887, and received his commission the same day. His service terminated on November 12, 1916, due to his death in Toulminville, Alabama.

== Sources ==
Legal offices
Preceded by Seat established by 24 Stat. 213	Judge of the United States District Court for the Southern District of Alabama; 1887–1916	Succeeded by Robert Tait Ervin
