= Alabama State Route 265 =

State highway in Alabama, United States

State Route 265

Route information
- Maintained by ALDOT
- Length: 20.848 mi (33.552 km)

Major junctions
- South end: SR 21 / SR 47 in Beatrice
- North end: SR 28 / SR 41 in Camden

Location
- Country: United States
- State: Alabama
- Counties: Monroe, Wilcox

Highway system
- Alabama State Highway System; Interstate; US; State
← SR 263	→ SR 269

State Route 265 (SR 265) is a 21-mile-long (34 km) route that serves as a connection between SR 21/SR 47 at Beatrice with SR 28/SR 41 at Camden.

== Route description ==
The northern terminus of SR 265 is located at its intersection with SR 28/SR 41 in Camden. The route then takes a southerly track to its southern terminus at SR 21/SR 47 in Beatrice.

== Major intersections ==
County	Location	mi	km	Destinations	Notes
Monroe	Beatrice	0.000	0.000	SR 21 / SR 47 – Monroeville, Oak Hill, Pine Apple	Southern terminus
Wilcox	Camden	20.848	33.552	SR 28 / SR 41 (Claiborne Street) – Selma, Monroeville, Thomaston	Northern terminus
1.000 mi = 1.609 km; 1.000 km = 0.621 mi
