= River Ridge, Monroe County, Alabama =

River Ridge, Alabama
- Unincorporated community
- Location within Alabama Location within the United States
- Coordinates: 31°42′50″N 87°18′47″W
- Country: United States
- State: Alabama
- County: Monroe
- Elevation: 108 ft (33 m)
- Time zone: UTC-6 (Central (CST))
  - Summer (DST): UTC-5 (CDT)
- Area code: 251
- GNIS feature ID: 156971

River Ridge is an unincorporated community in Monroe County, Alabama, United States.

== Notable person ==
- John McDuffie, jurist and legislator, was born in River Ridge.
