= Robbins Hotel =

- U.S. National Register of Historic Places
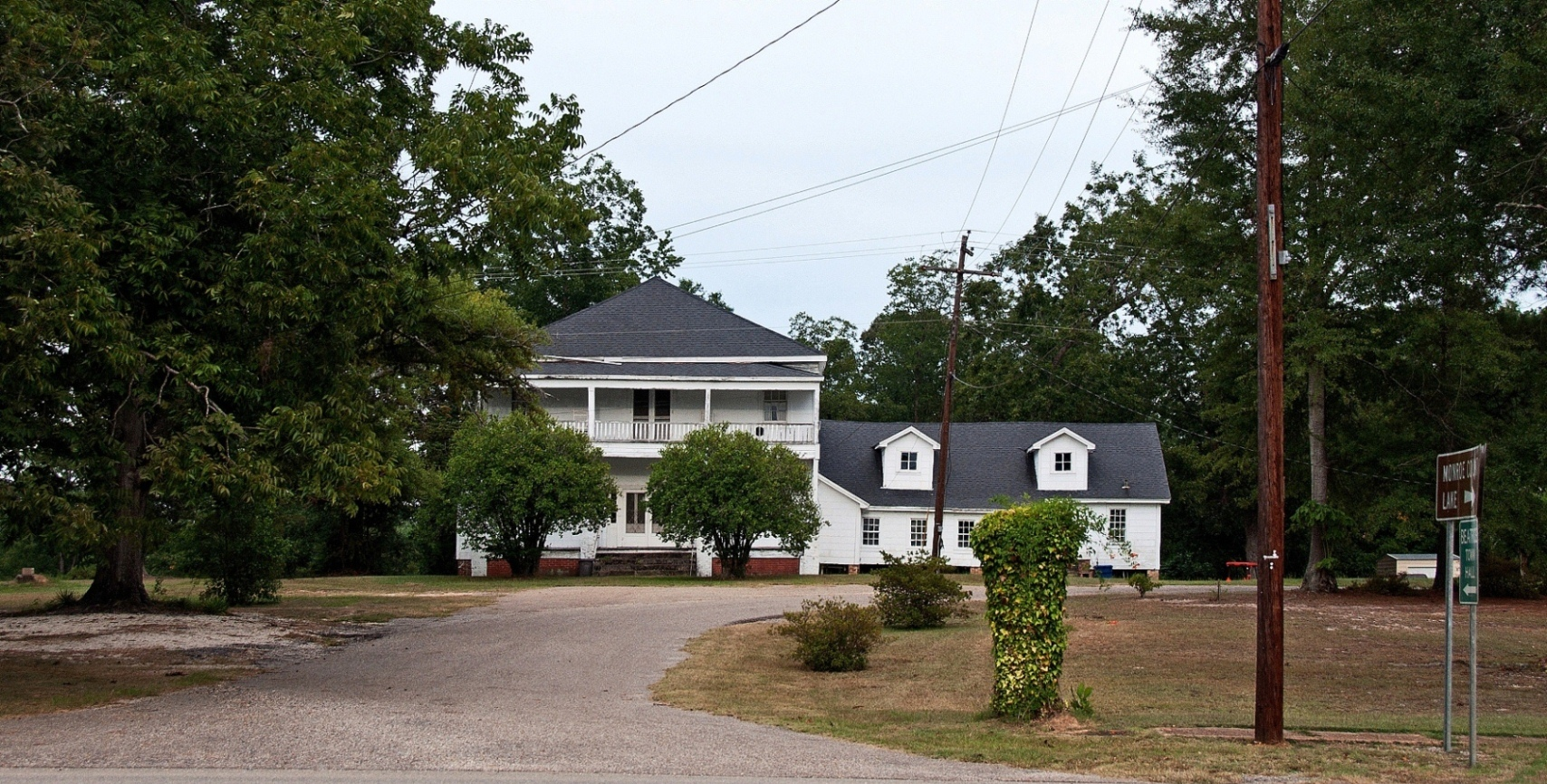
- The former hotel in 2011

- Location within Alabama Location within the United States
- Location: AL 265, Beatrice, Alabama
- Coordinates: 31°44′9″N 87°12′35″W
- NRHP reference No.: 87000858
- Added to NRHP: August 26, 1987

The Robbins Hotel was a historic hotel building in Beatrice, Alabama. The nucleus of the building started out as a private, one-story home with six rooms, built circa 1840. A second floor was added sometime later. The house was converted to a hotel between 1906 and 1910.

The hotel comprised a two-story, hipped-roof main block that measures approximately 40 by 50 feet (12 m × 15 m), with a 40-foot (12 m) long one-and-a-half-story dining room wing with an end-gable roof and dormer windows to the southeast. The main block features full-width two-story porches at the front and rear. Architectural historians considered it to be a good example of a small privately owned southern hotel, which opened as a direct result of the completion of the railroad connecting west Alabama and the coast at the end of the 19th century. It was added to the National Register of Historic Places on August 26, 1987. The building burned on October 12, 2012.
