= Claiborne, Alabama =

- Ghost town
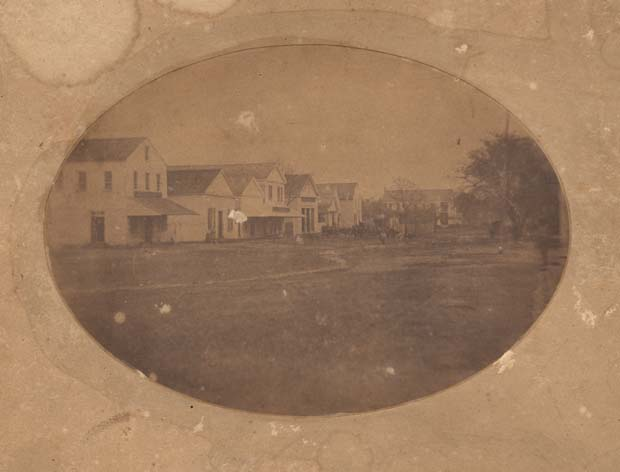
- A street in Claiborne during the 1850s

- Location within Alabama Location within the United States
- Coordinates: 31.54016°N 87.51554°W
- Country: United States
- State: Alabama
- County: Monroe
- Elevation: 180 ft (55 m)
- Time zone: UTC-6 (Central (CST))
  - Summer (DST): UTC-5 (CDT)
- ZIP code: 36445
- Area code: 251

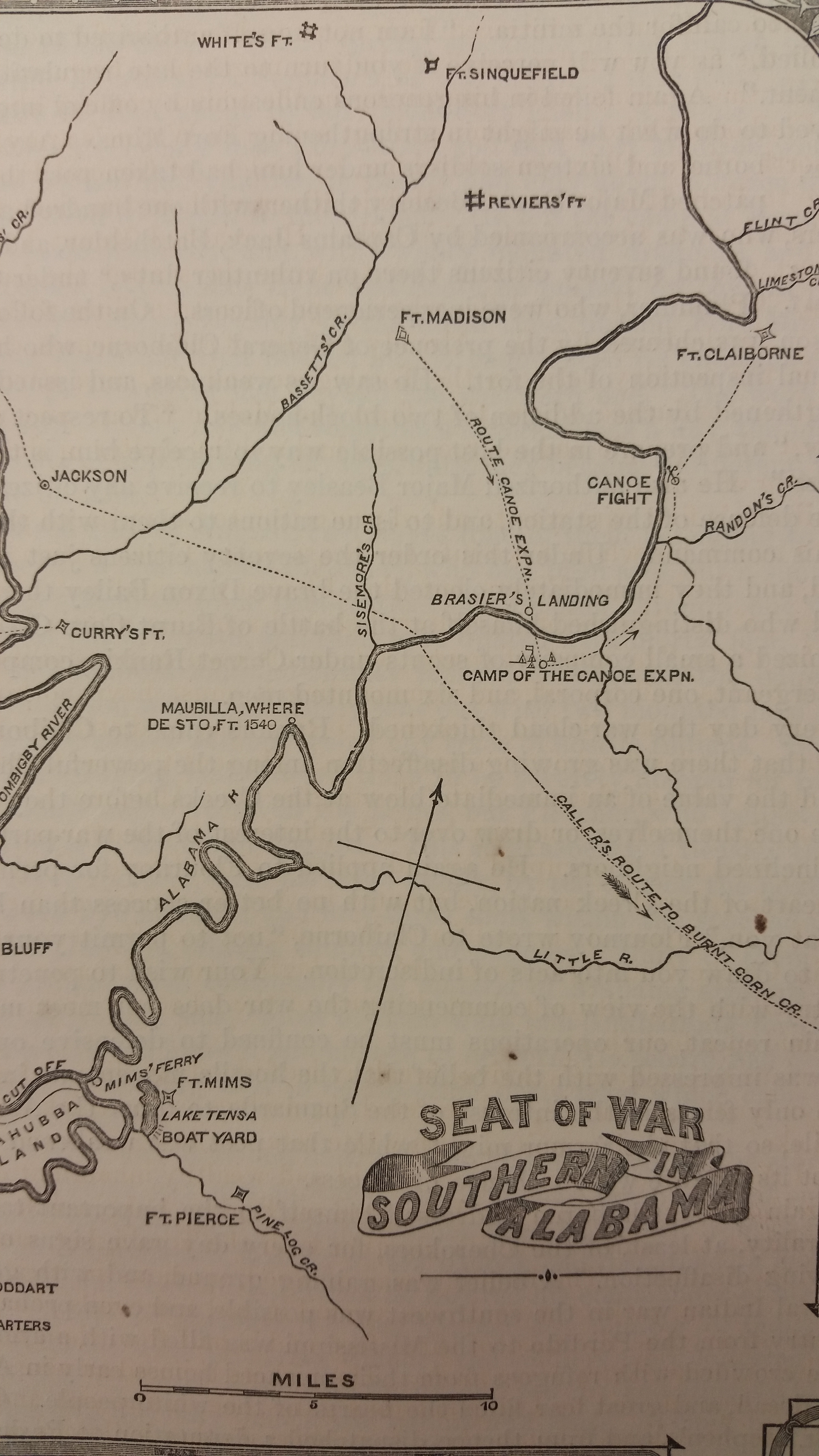
Map of Alabama during the War of 1812. Fort Claiborne is located in the upper right.

Claiborne is a ghost town on a bluff above the Alabama River in Monroe County, Alabama.

== History ==
Situated near the Federal Road, Claiborne began during the Mississippi Territory period with a ferry over the river. During the Creek War a large stockade fort, named Fort Claiborne, was established at the site by General Ferdinand Claiborne. He used the fort as a base for the invasion of the Creek nation with the Regular Army of the United States, the Lower Tombigbee Militia, and friendly Choctaw. The community of Claiborne began in 1816, on the former fort site.

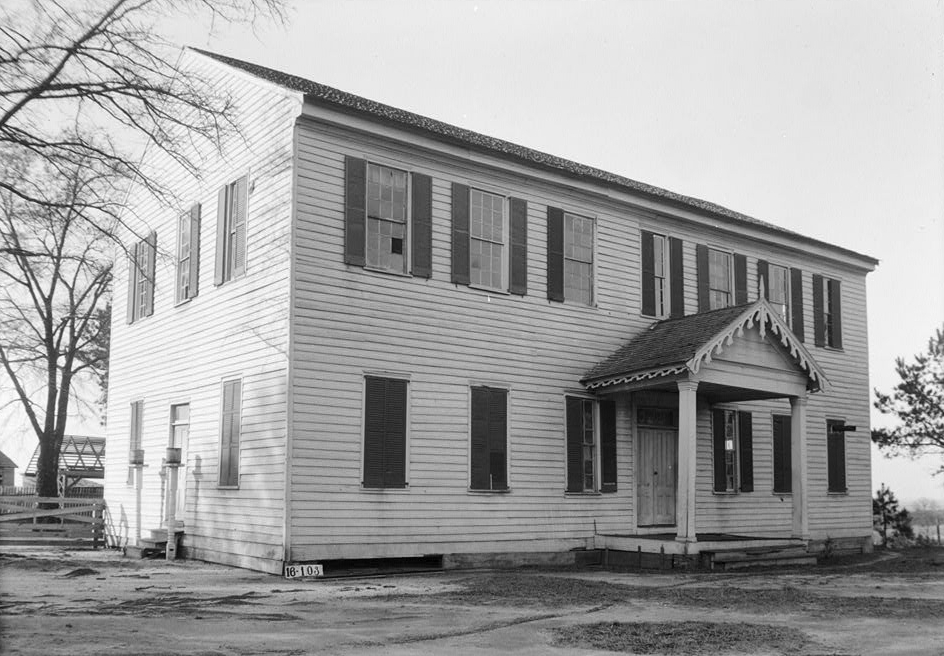
Claiborne's former Masonic Lodge #3, built in 1824 to serve as a masonic hall and courthouse. It was moved to Perdue Hill in 1884.

Following the war Claiborne became one of the largest and fastest growing communities in what would become Alabama. Early settlers included three future Alabama governors: John Gayle, John Murphy, and Arthur P. Bagby. William B. Travis, a hero of the Alamo, lived in Claiborne for many years before leaving for Texas in 1831. Other prominent politicians included James Dellet and Charles Tait. The community was surveyed in 1819 by General John Coffee, with lots being numbered and sold. It was incorporated as a town on December 20, 1820 by the Alabama Legislature.

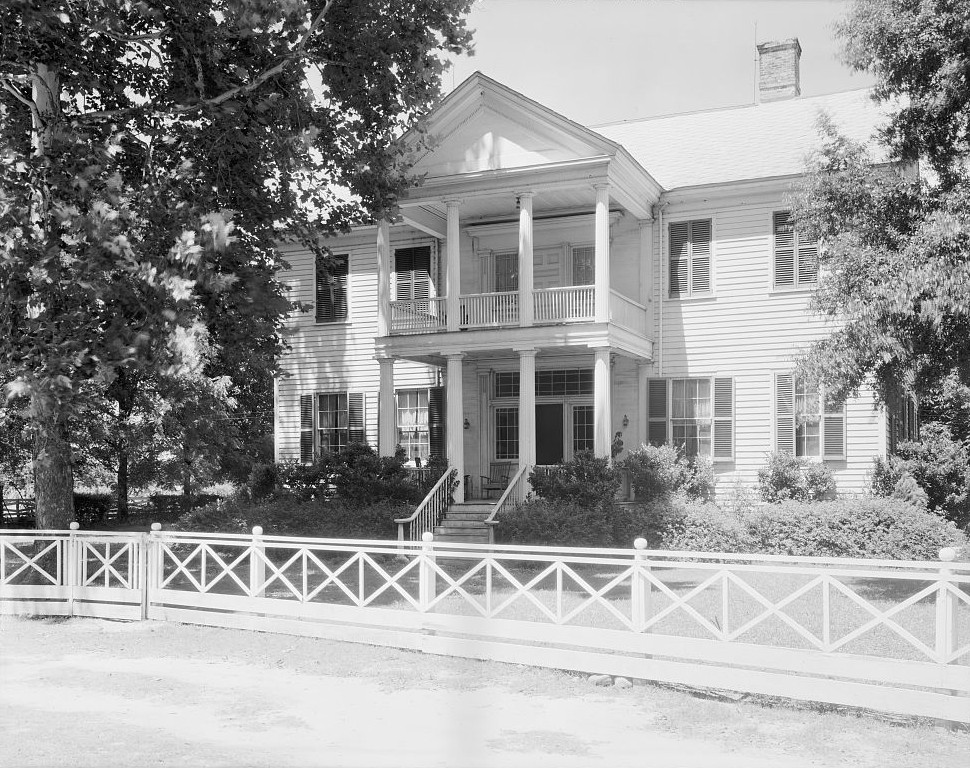
The James Dellet House is the only original residence remaining in Claiborne.

The first paddle steamer, the Harriet, to reach this far up the Alabama River landed at Claiborne in 1821. At that time the population had reached 2000 people. It had grown to 2500 by the time that the Marquis de Lafayette visited in April 1825 during his famous tour of all 24 US states. He was entertained in the newly built masonic hall, a building which, along with the William B. Travis house, still exists but was later moved to the nearby community of Perdue Hill. The town continued to expand during the 1830s, with the population peaking at roughly 5000 people. Claiborne served as the first county seat of Monroe County until 1832, when it was moved to the centrally located Monroeville. By then the town boasted two large hotels, numerous stores and business establishments, a cotton warehouse, a boarding house, a jail, a school, several churches, and a few hundred residences. At this point outbreaks of yellow fever and cholera stemmed further growth of the town. During his visit of North America, Charles Lyell collected fossil samples in Claiborne.

Claiborne remained an important shipping port and trading center throughout the 1840s and 1850s. The coming of the American Civil War saw the construction of batteries along the lower Alabama River and at Claiborne. The town was heavily looted at the end of the war. Following the war, the town quickly lost importance in the new economy. By 1872 the population had dwindled to approximately 350 people. When the new railroad through Monroe County bypassed Claiborne in the early 20th century, the fate of the settlement was sealed. By 2008 the site contained only the James Dellet House and three 19th-century cemeteries.

Claiborne had a newspaper, the Alabama Courier, that was published by Tucker and Turner from 1819 to the 1820s.

== Demographics ==
Historical population
Census	Pop.	Note	%±
1880	199		—
U.S. Decennial Census

Claiborne appeared only once on the U.S. Census, in 1880, as a separately returned community. Its population was 199, which made it the largest in Monroe County.

== Geography ==
Claiborne is located at 31.54016°N 87.51554°W and has an elevation of 180 feet (55 m).

== Notable person ==
- Arthur P. Bagby Jr., lawyer, editor, and Confederate States Army colonel during the American Civil War
- William B. Travis., Commander of the Alamo (1836). Wife and Son, lived in Claiborne, AL.
