= William C. Maxwell =

United States Army Air Service pilot (1892–1920)

William Calvin Maxwell
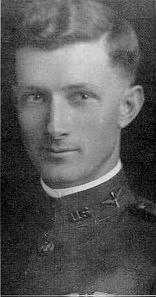
- Born: November 9, 1892; Natchez, Alabama
- Died: August 12, 1920 (aged 27); Manila, Philippines
- Burial place: Robinsonville Baptist Church Cemetery; Atmore, Alabama
- Alma mater: University of Alabama 1917
- Military career
- Allegiance: United States
- Branch: U.S. Army Air Service
- Service years: 1918–1920
- Rank: Second Lieutenant
- Unit: 3rd Aero Squadron

William Calvin Maxwell (November 9, 1892 – August 12, 1920) was an American pilot in the United States Army Air Service and namesake of Maxwell Air Force Base in Montgomery, Alabama.

Born in Natchez, Alabama, Maxwell was one of seven children of John R. and Jennie Maxwell, and was raised in Atmore. He enrolled as an Army ROTC student at the University of Alabama in Tuscaloosa, and left college in 1917 to enlist in the Army during World War I.

Maxwell received his commission in April 1918, after completing flight training at Kelly Field at San Antonio, Texas. In 1919, he was assigned to 3rd Aero Squadron, Philippines. On August 12, 1920, engine trouble forced Lt. Maxwell to attempt to land his DH-4 in a sugarcane field. Maneuvering to avoid a group of children playing below, he struck a flagpole stanchion hidden by the tall sugarcane and was killed instantly. He was buried back in Atmore at the Robinsonville Baptist Church Cemetery.

== Honors ==
On the recommendation of his former commanding officer, Major Roy C. Brown, Montgomery Air Intermediate Depot was renamed Maxwell Field on November 8, 1922.
