= Wainwright, Alabama =

- Unincorporated community
- Location within Alabama Location within the United States
- Coordinates: 31°38′57″N 87°29′13″W
- Country: United States
- State: Alabama
- County: Monroe
- Elevation: 210 ft (64 m)
- Time zone: UTC-6 (Central (CST))
  - Summer (DST): UTC-5 (CDT)
- Area code: 251
- GNIS feature ID: 157207

Wainwright is an unincorporated community located in Monroe County, Alabama, United States, approximately 100 miles northeast of Mobile and 100 miles southwest of Montgomery.
