= Mexia, Alabama =

- Unincorporated community
- Location within Alabama Location within the United States
- Coordinates: 31°30′26″N 87°23′18″W
- Country: United States
- State: Alabama
- County: Monroe
- Elevation: 413 ft (126 m)
- Time zone: UTC-6 (Central (CST))
  - Summer (DST): UTC-5 (CDT)
- ZIP code: 36458
- Area code: 251
- GNIS feature ID: 122677

Mexia /ˈmɛkʃə/ is an unincorporated community in Monroe County, Alabama, United States. Mexia is located on Alabama State Route 47, 4 miles (6.4 km) west-southwest of Monroeville. Mexia has a post office with ZIP code 36458. Mexia has two small historic cemeteries on Thompson Road and Rolland Road. The largest church in Mexia is Mexia Baptist Church located on Old Salem Road. In Mexia there is also New Chapel Baptist Church located on Snowden Road, and Old Salem Baptist Church located on Old Salem Creek Road.
