= Monroeville Downtown Historic District =

Historic district in Alabama, United States

- U.S. National Register of Historic Places
- U.S. Historic district
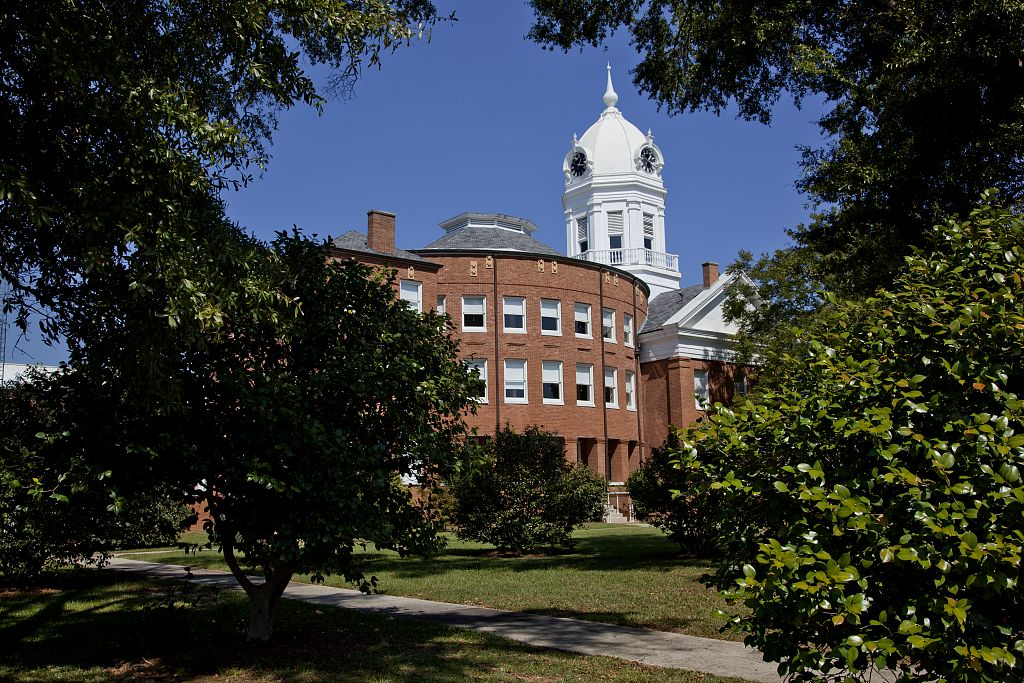
- View of the Old Monroe County Courthouse in the courthouse square.

- Location within Alabama Location within the United States
- Location: Parts of N. and S. Alabama Aves., E. and W. Claiborne St., N. and S. Mount Pleasant Aves., Pineville Rd., Monroeville, Alabama
- Coordinates: 31°31′35″N 87°19′27″W
- Area: 40 acres (16 ha)
- NRHP reference No.: 09000606
- Added to NRHP: September 16, 2009

The Monroeville Downtown Historic District is a 40-acre (16 ha) historic district in downtown Monroeville, Alabama. It is centered on the courthouse square and the streets that border it. The streets include Claiborne Street on the south, Alabama Avenue on the east, Pineville Road on the north and Mount Pleasant Avenue on the west. The district includes examples of the Classical Revival, American Craftsman, Moderne, and other residential and commercial architectural styles. It contains 63 structures, with 51 of them listed as contributing buildings. It was added to the National Register of Historic Places on September 16, 2009.
