= Scratch Ankle, Alabama =

- Unincorporated community
- Location within Alabama Location within the United States
- Coordinates: 31°39′46″N 87°26′15″W
- Country: United States
- State: Alabama
- County: Monroe
- Elevation: 361 ft (110 m)
- Time zone: UTC-6 (Central (CST))
  - Summer (DST): UTC-5 (CDT)
- Area code: 251
- GNIS feature ID: 126495

Scratch Ankle is an unincorporated community in Monroe County, Alabama, United States, located 12 miles (19 km) northwest of Monroeville.

== History ==
Scratch Ankle got its name from the fact that locals were often seen by railroad workers scratching their ankles due to excessive mosquito bites. It has been frequently noted on lists of unusual place names.
