= Monroe County School District (Alabama) =

School district in Alabama, United States

Address
- 109 Pickens Street Monroeville, Alabama, 36460; United States

District information
- Type: Public
- Grades: PreK–12
- NCES District ID: 0102400

Students and staff
- Students: 3,152
- Teachers: 194.0
- Staff: 177.25
- Student–teacher ratio: 16.25

Other information
- Website: www.monroe.k12.al.us

Monroe County School District is a school district in Monroe County, Alabama.

Its boundary is that of the county.

The schools of the District include:

- Caswell P. Carmichael Alternative Learning Center
- J.F. Shields High School
- J.U. Blacksher School
- Monroe County Career Technical Center
- Monroe County High School
- Monroe Intermediate School
- Monroeville Elementary School
- Monroeville Middle School
