= Toulminville, Alabama =

Neighborhood in Mobile, Alabama, United States

Coordinates: 30.713434°N 88.08471°W

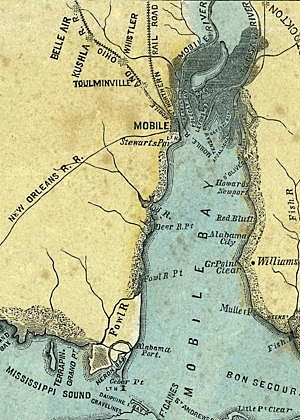
Toulminville, Alabama (upper left), during the American Civil War

Toulminville is a neighborhood of Mobile, Alabama, United States. It began as a small settlement on the property of Harry Theophilus Toulmin, who served as Sheriff of Mobile County in the 1830s. During the American Civil War, Toulminville was mapped along the Mobile and Ohio Railroad as a significant settlement, northwest of Mobile (see map). In 1945, the remainder of Toulminville was annexed into the city of Mobile. The area of Toulminville has varied over the past decades from being an upper-middle class suburb to middle class in the mid 2000s.The violent crime rate in the area per 100K rose from ~594 in 2014 to ~902 in 2023 and still raising under the leadership of Councilman Cory Penn years 2021-2025.

== Annexation by Mobile ==
Toulminville remained a largely rural settlement until after the Civil War, when it slowly took on the character of a suburb to Mobile. It remained largely exurban in character until the 20th century, when growth within the city of Mobile spilled over into Toulminville. Part of Toulminville was annexed into the city of Mobile in the 1920s, and the whole of Toulminville was annexed into the city of Mobile in 1945, in the annexation which tripled the size of Mobile's corporate limits. By World War II, Toulminville had become an upper-middle class suburb, with many affluent neighborhoods built along Stanton and Summerville streets.

Professional baseball player Hank Aaron grew up in Toulminville as a young boy. The woman to create the first Black female softball team in the city Mrs. Floretta Peggy Rose Fortune recognized by the U.S. House of Representatives also grew up in the Toulminville community and has a Walking trail named in her honor.

== White flight ==
Suburbanization started after World War II, as highways were built and new houses were built outside the city. Middle and upper-class whites began to move out of the city to newer housing, especially after desegregation following civil rights advances of the 1960s. A perceived upsurge of crime on Mobile's north side contributed to this white migration. The district was majority white in 1960 and became nearly 80% black by 1975. Toulminville was the heart of the district he was in a Mobile NAACP.

Upper-class neighborhoods along Stanton and Summerville streets retained their white population for some time. In the 1980s they became majority black and retained high property values. While Stanton and Summerville are middle-class areas, most of Toulminville is lower-class.

Toulminville was the birthplace of United States Surgeon General William Crawford Gorgas, who worked to control yellow fever and malaria during World War I. Several streets and an elementary school were named after him. Figures Park, named for Senator Michael Figures, an influential African-American politician of the 20th century, was originally named Gorgas Park, in honor of the general. This neighborhood was the adolescent home of baseball legend Hank Aaron.

== Education ==
Toulminville is within the Mobile County Public School System. Washington Middle School is in Toulminville.

LeFlore Magnet High School (originally Toulminville High School) is a performing arts magnet school named in honor of John L. LeFlore. Toulminville High School was renamed LeFlore High School in honor of LeFlore. In the 1980s, it was converted into a magnet school, which under Mobile County Public School policy to increase diversity, is ideally to have a 50/50 black white mix. The county is majority white and the school is 98% African-American, making it one of the least diverse schools in the state of Alabama.
