= Frank W. Boykin =

American politician (1885–1969)

Frank Boykin
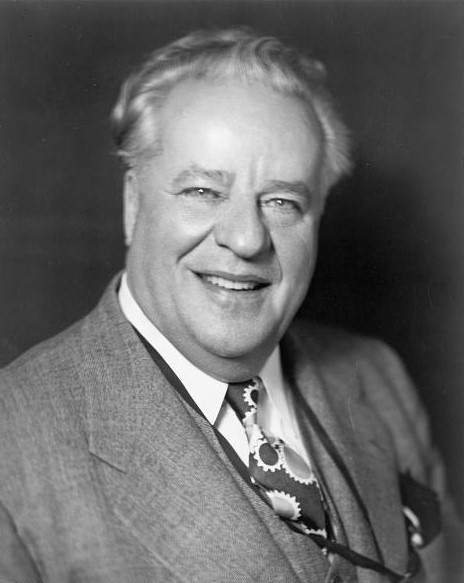
- Boykin in 1953

Member of the U.S. House of Representatives from Alabama's 1st district
- In office July 30, 1935 – January 3, 1963
- Preceded by: John McDuffie
- Succeeded by: District eliminated (redistricting)

Personal details
- Born: Frank William Boykin; February 21, 1885 Bladon Springs, Alabama, U.S.
- Died: March 12, 1969 (aged 84) Washington, D.C., U.S.
- Party: Democratic
- Spouse: Ocllo Gunn
- Children: 5

Frank William Boykin Sr. (February 21, 1885 – March 12, 1969) served as a Democratic congressman in Alabama's 1st congressional district from 1935-1963. The son of sharecroppers, Boykin became the wealthiest man in Mobile, although his entrepreneurial practices led to several criminal investigations and prosecutions—both before his legislative service and as it ended.

== Early and family life ==
Born in Bladon Springs, Alabama, the fourth of ten children born to sharecropper James Clark Boykin and his wife, the former Glovinia Ermenia Ainsworth, Boykin's little formal education ended in the fourth grade. In 1893, the family moved to Fairford in Washington County, where Frank initially helped at the family store.

== Career ==
Through hard work and perseverance, Boykin became a successful businessman with interests in lumber, turpentine, commissaries and real estate. He later related that when 12 years old, he rose from water boy of a Washington County railroad construction crew, to dispatcher and conductor. When he was 15, he became manager of the railroad's commissary, owned by Kansas City's Seaboard Manufacturing Company. The following year, Boykin and John Everett built the first brick store in Washington County, and in 1905 Boykin bought his first sawmill. In 1915, Boykin moved to the nearest city, Mobile, and he and Everett continued to invest in real estate, sawmills and commissary stores. Sometimes they acquired real estate, particularly from Choctaw Native Americans, in exchange for debt owed to their stores, which was later criticized.

During World War I, shipbuilding contracts led to industrialization in Mobile, and Boykin became an executive with several shipbuilding companies. He also became one of the more prominent defendants in Mobile's whiskey trials of 1924 and 1925, as discussed below. In 1927 his partner Everett died, with Boykin as his executor. In 1939, Boykin bought out the Everett family's remaining interest in their joint investments for $9,900, which his brother Matt Boykin, the local probate judge, approved.

== Political career ==
In 1935, he was elected to Congress from the Mobile-based 1st District following Congressman John McDuffie's appointment to a federal judgeship. Since Boykin hadn't voted in any election since the 1920s, he had to pay 14 years' worth of back poll taxes to be able to cast a vote for himself. He won the seat again in 1936 and was reelected 12 times. Throughout 1939, 1940 and 1941 Boykin advocated helping the United Kingdom in their war against Nazi Germany. Boykin voted in favor of the 1941 Lend Lease Act to provide material aid for the British military. He was chairman of the House Patents Committee from 1943 to 1947. He ran in a special election for the United States Senate in 1946, but finished a distant third.

Boykin was considered a congressman whose mission was to take care of his district's citizens. Although his seniority allowed him to steer millions of federal dollars to his district, he was known for missing roll call votes more often than any other member of the state's congressional delegation.

Boykin supported racial segregation, though he had a reputation for helping black constituents even if they couldn't vote. He had a particularly warm relationship with Alex Herman, the father of Bill Clinton's Secretary of Labor, Alexis Herman. For example, he encouraged Herman to deliver black votes in the Mobile area to Senator Lister Hill during Hill's contentious 1962 election. It is believed that Hill's 6,000-vote margin of victory in that election was due mostly to heavy black turnout in Mobile.

Having been a signatory to the 1956 Southern Manifesto that opposed the desegregation of public schools ordered by the Supreme Court in Brown v. Board of Education, in 1957 Boykin voted against the Civil Rights Act.

Boykin lost his seat in 1962, when Alabama's congressional delegation was cut from nine to eight members after the 1960 United States Census. The state legislature couldn't agree on which district to eliminate, so all nine incumbents ran against each other in an unusual statewide election. The last-place finisher would be dropped, while the eight survivors would become at-large congressmen. Boykin finished last, trailing the eighth-place finisher, Kenneth A. Roberts of the 4th District, by 100,000 votes.

== Corruption charge ==
During Prohibition, Boykin became one of the prominent defendants in Mobile's "whisky trials", which began as U.S. Attorney for Southern Alabama Aubrey Broyles announced Boykin had attempted to bribe him. Although initial charges were dismissed following an evidentiary ruling which forbade prosecutors from introducing Boykin's correspondence with the Harding administration, Boykin was later convicted, then the conviction reversed on appeal.

== Bribery Conviction ==
In July 1963, Boykin was convicted of conspiracy and conflict of interest, on charges of conspiracy and conflict-of-interest relating to land deals in Maryland and Virginia, based on his using his congressional influence to gain dismissal of mail fraud charges against banker J. Kenneth Edlin. He served six months' probation and fined. President Johnson pardoned Boykin in 1965, at the request of departing Attorney General Robert F. Kennedy.

== Personal life ==
In 1913, Boykin married Ocllo Gunn of Thomasville, Alabama. In their nearly 56 year marriage, they had and raised five children. He frequently cheated on her and bragged openly about it in the House cloakroom. According to his son, Ocllo knew all along about her husband's numerous infidelities.

== Death and legacy ==
In 1969, Boykin died of heart failure in Washington, D.C. but his remains returned to Mobile, Alabama, where he was interred in Pine Crest Cemetery. In 1973, his family authorized a posthumous biography, Everything's Made for Love in this Man's World, which is no longer in print.

Several locations in his former district are named after him, including a public housing complex, an elementary school in McIntosh and a highway. For sixty years, the family's Tensaw Land and Timber Company allowed hunters onto its land near Citronelle, but in 2015 announced termination of the relationship that had created the Frank W. and Rob M. Boykin Wildlife Management Area. A scholarship at Huntingdon College in Montgomery also honors the former Congressman.

== See also ==
- List of American federal politicians convicted of crimes
- List of people pardoned or granted clemency by the president of the United States

U.S. House of Representatives
Preceded by John McDuffie	Member of the U.S. House of Representatives from Alabama's 1st congressional district 1935–1963	Succeeded by Jack Edwards
