= Old Monroe County Courthouse =

- U.S. National Register of Historic Places
- U.S. National Historic Landmark
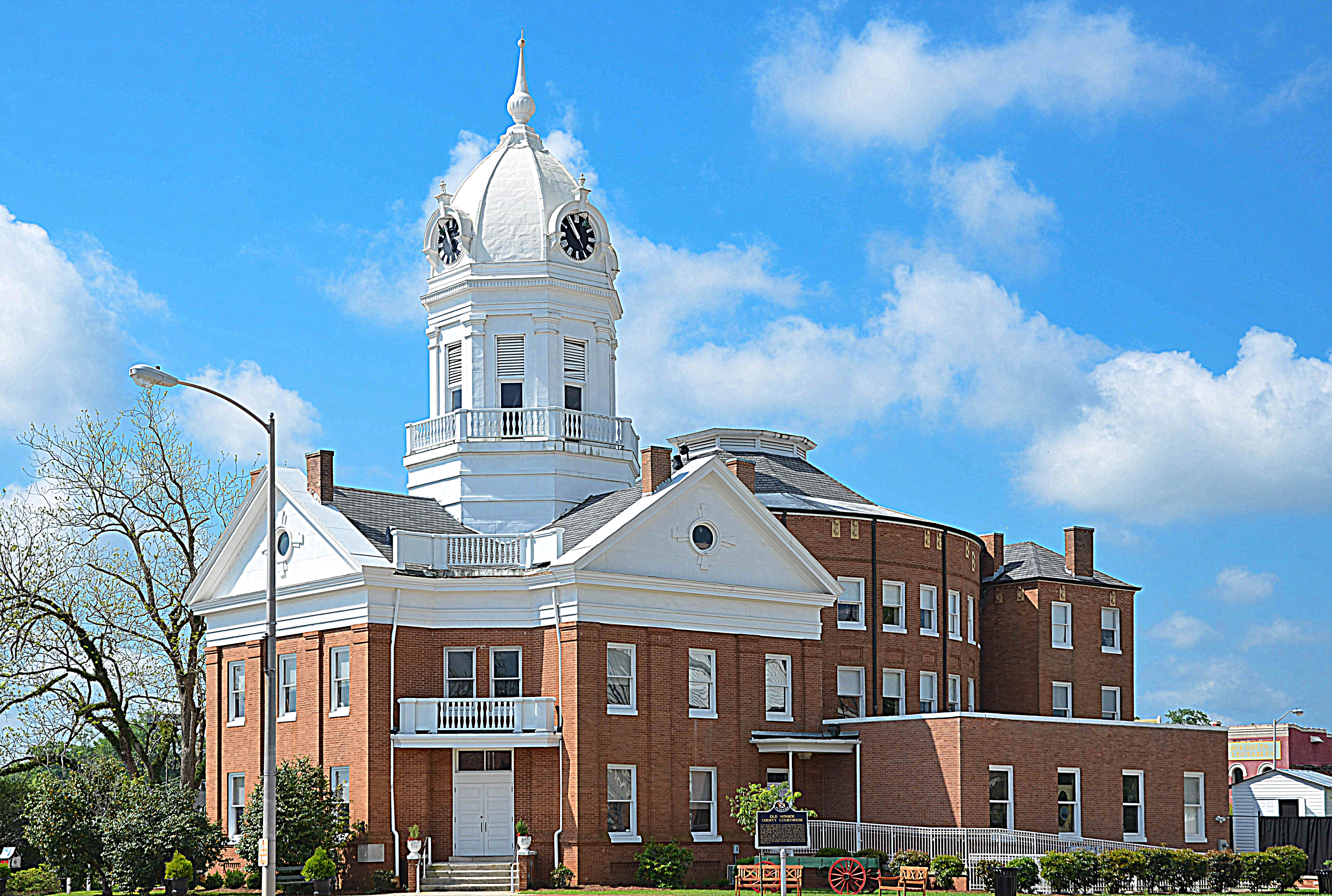

- Location within Alabama Location within the United States
- Interactive map showing the location of Old Monroe County Courthouse
- Location: Courthouse Sq., Monroeville, Alabama
- Coordinates: 31°31′38″N 87°19′27″W
- Area: 1 acre (0.40 ha)
- Built: 1903; 123 years ago
- Architectural style: Eclecticism
- NRHP reference No.: 73000366, 100006236

Significant dates
- Added to NRHP: April 26, 1973
- Designated NHL: January 13, 2021

The Old Monroe County Courthouse is a historic courthouse building in Monroeville, Alabama that served as the Monroe County courthouse from 1903 to 1963.

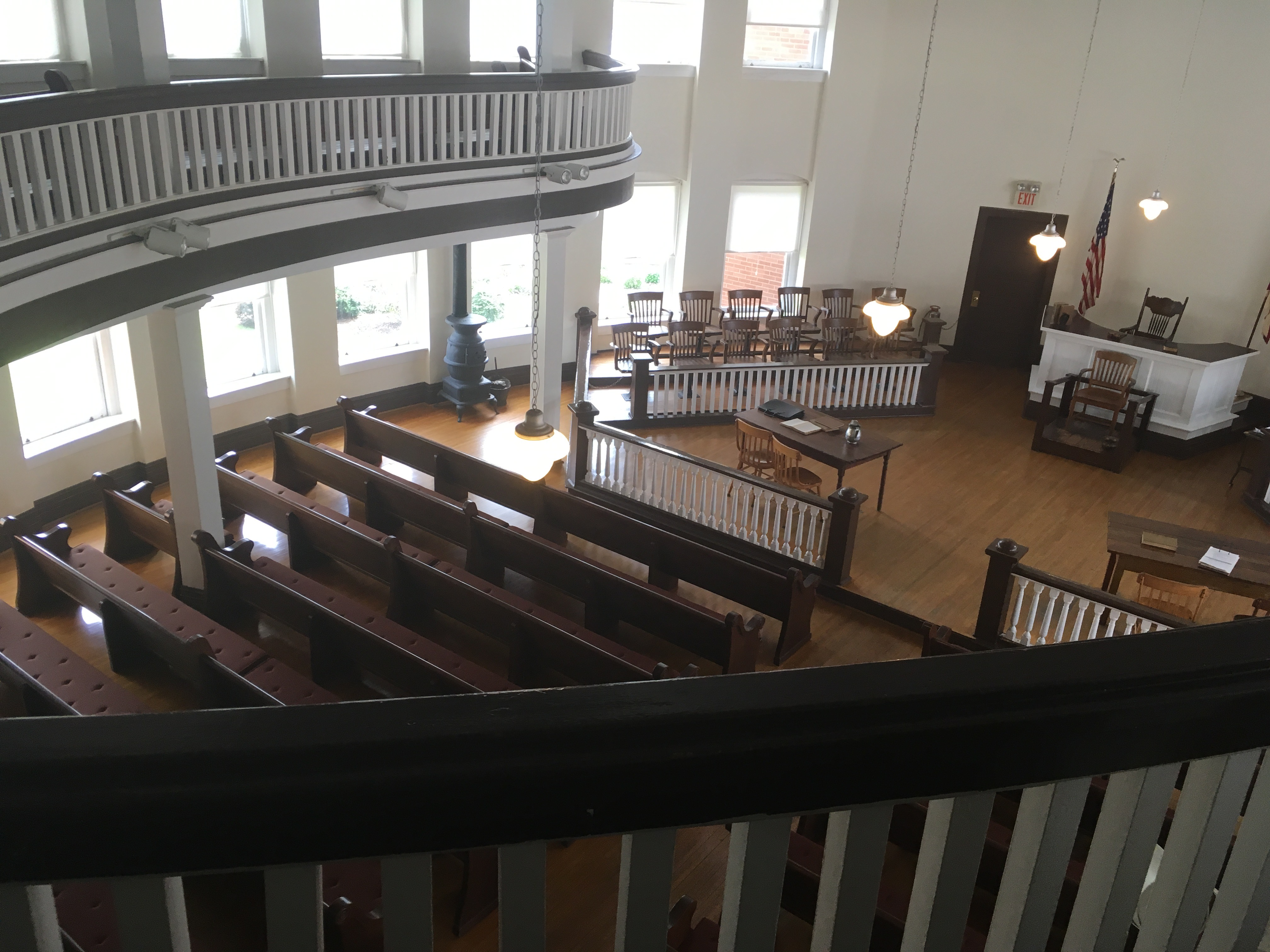
The Old Monroe County Courthouse was the model for the set used in the film

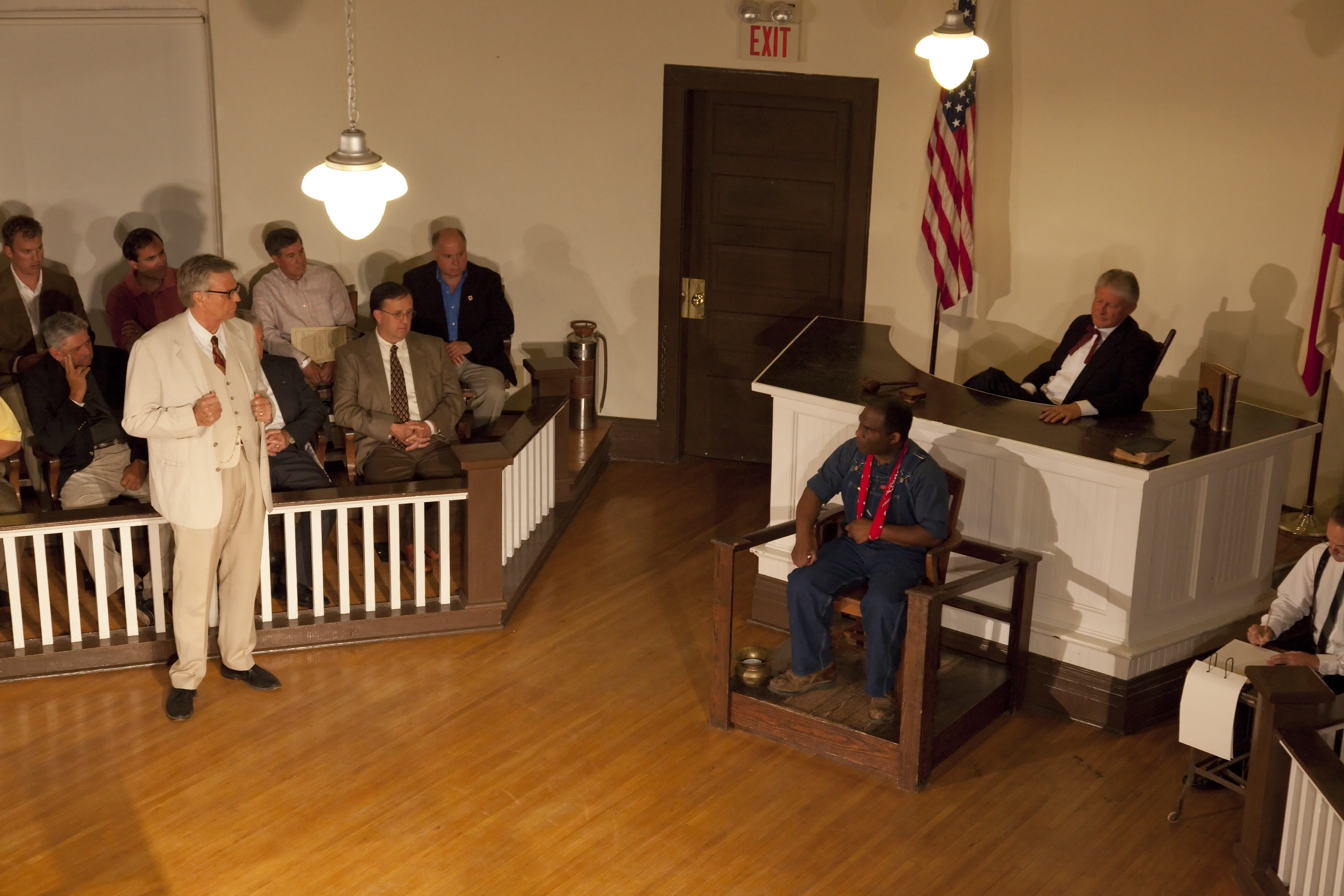
A scene from the play performed in the Old Courthouse

It is significant as an Alabama literary landmark due to its association with Harper Lee and Truman Capote, both of whom spent their childhood in Monroeville and featured the courthouse in their work. Capote mentions it in his A Christmas Memory and it inspired the fictional courthouse in Lee's To Kill A Mockingbird.

The film adaptation of Lee's novel was heavily influenced by the courthouse, with production designers measuring and photographing the building and then recreating a close duplicate of the interior on a sound stage for filming of the courtroom scenes. The producers originally wanted to use the actual courthouse in Monroeville as the movie set, but due to the modernization of the town since Lee's birth in addition to the poor audio quality in the courthouse, they made the backlot in Hollywood instead.

Due to the accuracy of the recreated courthouse in Hollywood, many Alabamians still believe that the film was shot in Monroeville. The Old Courthouse in Monroe County is now a theater for many plays on "To Kill a Mockingbird" as well a museum dedicated to multiple authors from Monroeville, including Lee.

It was listed on the National Register of Historic Places in 1973, and was designated a National Historic Landmark in 2021.

The courthouse is now one of the Monroe County Museums and is operated as the Old Courthouse Museum. The building has been restored to a 1930s appearance and also features exhibits about Capote and Lee.

== See also ==
- National Register of Historic Places listings in Monroe County, Alabama
- List of National Historic Landmarks in Alabama
