= Vocation, Alabama =

- Unincorporated community
- Location within Alabama Location within the United States
- Coordinates: 31°15′51″N 87°25′58″W
- Country: United States
- State: Alabama
- County: Monroe
- Elevation: 361 ft (110 m)
- Time zone: UTC-6 (Central (CST))
  - Summer (DST): UTC-5 (CDT)
- Area code: 251
- GNIS feature ID: 128475

Vocation is an unincorporated area in Monroe County, Alabama, United States.

== History ==
A post office called Vocation was established in 1927, and remained in operation until 1932. The origin of the name "Vocation" is obscure.
