= Dellet Plantation =

Historic house in Alabama, United States

- U.S. National Register of Historic Places
- U.S. Historic district
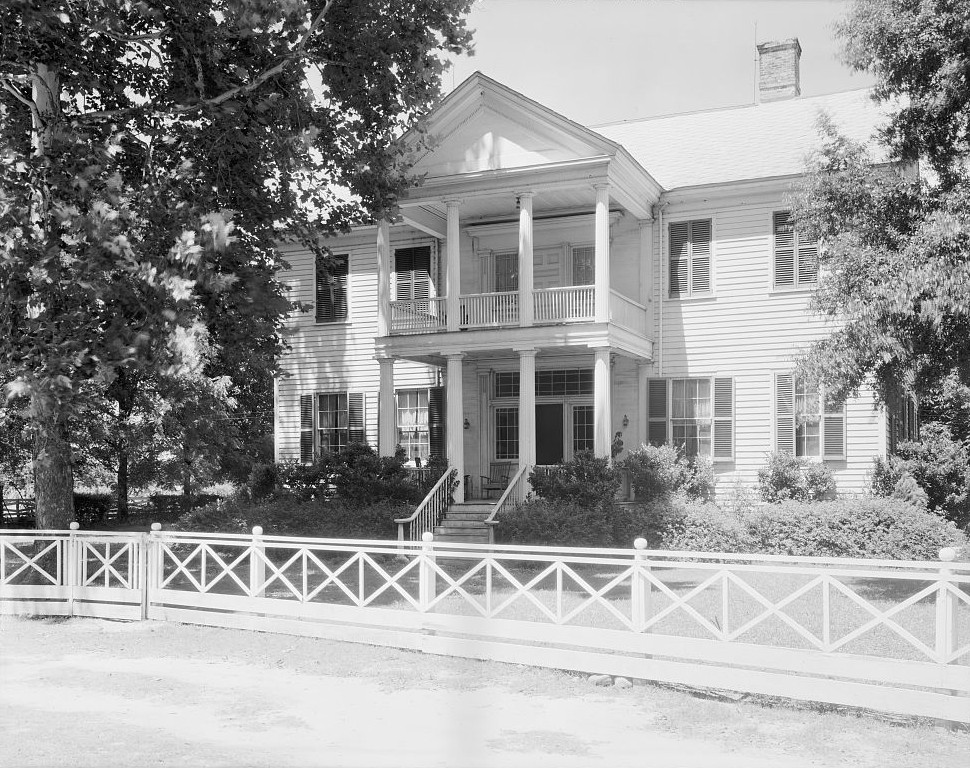
- The James Dellet House on the Dellet Plantation, built 1835-1840.

- Location within Alabama Location within the United States
- Nearest city: Claiborne, Alabama
- Coordinates: 31°34′19″N 87°32′39″W
- Area: 4,000 acres (1,600 ha)
- Built: 1835-1850
- Architectural style: Federal, Vernacular farm structures
- NRHP reference No.: 93001517
- Added to NRHP: September 2, 1994

The Dellet Plantation, also known as Dellet Park, is a plantation and historic district about three miles northwest of the ghost town of Claiborne, Alabama. The historic district covers 4,000 acres (1,600 ha) and includes 17 contributing buildings, two contributing structures, and one site. The plantation was established by James Dellet, a prominent judge and United States Congressman, during the late 1810s, and transitioned from slave labor to tenant farming after the Civil War. The Federal style plantation house, with a two-tiered Doric portico on the front, was built between 1835 and 1840 by Dellet.
