= Vanity Fair Park =

Park in Monroeville, Alabama

- U.S. National Register of Historic Places
- Interactive map of Vanity Fair Park
- Location: 271 Park Dr., Monroeville, Alabama
- Coordinates: 31°30′56″N 87°20′43″W
- Built: 1949
- NRHP reference No.: 100005354
- Added to NRHP: July 23, 2020

Vanity Fair Park is a historic park in Monroeville, Alabama. The park was built by Vanity Fair Mills for the use of the employees in the town. It was established in 1948 with the creation of a 5-acre (2.0 ha) pond. The park also contains a picnic pavilion (built in 1949), tennis courts (1949), and a community house (1952). The pond was used for swimming until a pool was constructed in 1963. Near the park, but not historically contributing, is a golf course. VF donated the park to the city in 1980.

The park was listed on the National Register of Historic Places in 2020.
