= Alabama State Route 47 =

State highway in Alabama, United States

State Route 47

Route information
- Maintained by ALDOT
- Length: 43.063 mi (69.303 km)
- Existed: 1940–present

Major junctions
- South end: US 84 at Mexia
- SR 41 at Monroeville
- North end: SR 10 at Clinton

Location
- Country: United States
- State: Alabama
- Counties: Monroe County; Wilcox County

Highway system
- Alabama State Highway System; Interstate; US; State
← SR 46	→ SR 48

State Route 47 (SR 47) is a 43.063-mile-long (69.303 km) state highway in the southern part of the U.S. state of Alabama. The southern terminus of the highway is at its intersection with U.S. Route 84 (US 84) at Mexia in Monroe County, and the northern terminus of the highway is at its intersection with SR 10 at Clinton in Wilcox County.

Although the route is signed "north–south", the initial trajectory of SR 47 is eastward at its southern terminus.

== Route description ==
SR 47 begins at an intersection with US 84 in Mexia. It heads towards Monroeville. At Monroeville, the highway turns northward as it begins a 22-mile-long (35 km) concurrency with SR 21 heading towards Beatrice.

At Beatrice, SR 21 and SR 47 intersect SR 265 and turn eastward as they head towards Mater McQueen, where SR 21 turns northward and SR 47 continues eastward towards Walton, Monroe County, Alabama. At Walton, the highway intersects SR 83 and turns northeastward as it leads to its northern terminus at SR 10 in Clinton.

== Major intersections ==
County	Location	mi	km	Destinations	Notes
Monroe		0.000	0.000	US 84 / SR 47 Truck north (SR 12) – Repton, Grove Hill	Southern terminus of SR 47 and SR 47 Truck
Monroe	Monroeville	5.377– 5.478	8.653– 8.816	SR 41 / SR 21 Bus. south (Alabama Avenue / Mt. Pleasant Avenue) – Camden	South end of SR 21 Bus. concurrency; traffic circle around Monroe County Heritage Museum and Monroe County Courthouse
Monroe	Monroeville	6.225	10.018	SR 21 south / SR 47 Truck south – Atmore, Alabama Southern Community College	Northern terminus of SR 21 Bus. and SR 47 Truck; south end of SR 21 concurrency
Monroe	Beatrice	22.433	36.102	SR 265 north (Bryan Street) – Vredenburgh, Camden	Southern terminus of SR 265
Monroe	Mater McQueen	27.454	44.183	SR 21 north – Hayneville, McWilliams	North end of SR 21 concurrency
Monroe	Walton	32.258	51.914	SR 83 south – Evergreen	Northern terminus of SR 83
Wilcox	Clinton, Wilcox County	43.063	69.303	SR 10 – Camden, Greenville	Northern terminus
1.000 mi = 1.609 km; 1.000 km = 0.621 mi: Concurrency terminus

== Truck route ==
=== Monroeville truck route ===
State Route 47 Truck
- Location: Monroeville
- Length: 0.5 mi (800 m)

The entire route is in Monroe County.

Location	mi	km	Destinations	Notes
			US 84 west / SR 47 north	Southern terminus; southern terminus of SR 47; south end of US 84 concurrency
			US 84 east / SR 21 south / SR 41 south	North end of US 84 concurrency; south end of SR 21/SR 41 concurrency
			SR 136 east	Western terminus of SR 136
Monroeville			SR 41 north / SR 21 Bus.	North end of SR 41 concurrency; southern terminus of SR 21 Bus
Monroeville			SR 21 north / SR 47 / SR 21 Bus. south	Northern terminus; north end of SR 21 concurrency; northern terminus of SR 21 Bus
1.000 mi = 1.609 km; 1.000 km = 0.621 mi: Concurrency terminus
