= Vocation (poem) =

Poem by Rabindranath Tagore

- by Rabindranath Tagore
- Original title: বিচিত্র সাধ
- Translator: Unknown
- First published in: 1909
- Country: India
- Language: Bengali
- Subject: Child thoughts
- Publisher: Original - Unknown. Translated - Ratna Sagar P.Ltd.
- Published in English: 2006
- Media type: Original - unknown. Translated - hardcover
- Lines: Original - unknown Translated - 36
- Pages: Translated - 40-41
- ISBN: 81-8332-175-5

"Vocation" (Bengali: বিচিত্র সাধ) is a poem written by Rabindranath Tagore. It echoes a child's ever-changing dreams for the future, the search for a vocation.

== Plot ==
The poem describes a child's longing for the immense freedom he sees in the lives of those around him. When the gong sounds ten in the morning, he walks to his school and sees a great hawker crying "Bangles, crystal bangles!" and he wishes he could be a hawker. At four in the afternoon, while coming back from school, he sees a skillful gardener digging the ground and he wishes he were a gardener. When dusk falls his cruel mother sends him to bed and he sees an ever alert watchman through the window and he wishes he could be a watchman.
