= Natchez, Alabama =

- Unincorporated community
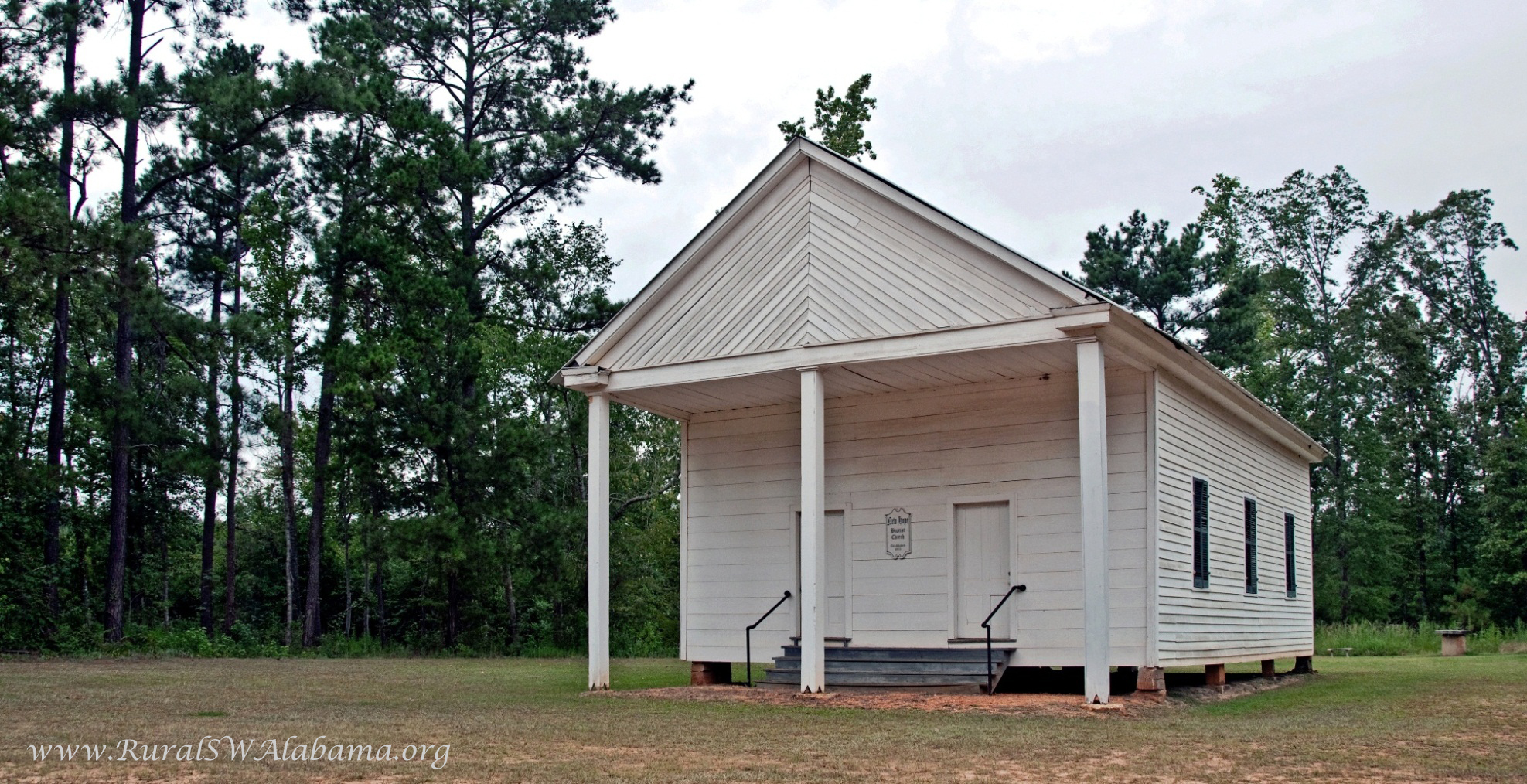
- New Hope Baptist Church in Natchez

- Location within Alabama Location within the United States
- Coordinates: 31°43′40″N 87°15′38″W
- Country: United States
- State: Alabama
- County: Monroe
- Elevation: 187 ft (57 m)
- Time zone: UTC-6 (Central (CST))
  - Summer (DST): UTC-5 (CDT)
- Area code: 251
- GNIS feature ID: 156767

Natchez is an unincorporated community in Monroe County, Alabama, United States. It was the birthplace of William C. Maxwell, a pilot in the United States Army Air Service and namesake of Maxwell Air Force Base in Montgomery, Alabama. The New Hope Baptist Church, located in Natchez, is listed on the National Register of Historic Places. A post office was operated in Natchez from 1891 to 1960.
