= Frisco City, Alabama =

- Town
- Seal

- Location of Frisco City in Monroe County, Alabama.
- Coordinates: 31°26′07″N 87°24′13″W
- Country: United States
- State: Alabama
- County: Monroe
- Established: 1886
- Incorporated: February 26, 1909

Government
  - Mayor: Brandaun T. Love
  - City Administrator: Shelley Dunn
  - Councilmember: Melissa Jackson; Woody Bullard; Johnny Ridgeway; Gregory Lett; Deloris Dailey

Area
  - Total: 4.04 sq mi (10.46 km^{2})
  - Land: 4.03 sq mi (10.43 km^{2})
  - Water: 0.0077 sq mi (0.02 km^{2})
- Elevation: 410 ft (120 m)

Population (2020)
  - Total: 1,170
  - Estimate (2022): 1,139
  - Density: 283/sq mi (109.2/km^{2})
- Time zone: UTC−6 (Central (CST))
  - Summer (DST): UTC−5 (CDT)
- ZIP Code: 36445
- Area code: 251
- FIPS code: 01-28312
- GNIS feature ID: 2406528
- Website: friscocityal.com

Frisco City is a town in Monroe County, Alabama, United States. The population was 1,170 at the 2020 census.

== Geography ==
According to the United States Census Bureau, the town has a total area of 4.04 square miles (10.5 km^{2}), of which 4.03 square miles (10.4 km^{2}) is land and 0.01 square miles (0.026 km^{2}), or 0.12%, is water.

== History ==
What would become Frisco City started out as two mid-19th century communities named Lufkin and Snider. It initially incorporated as the town of Jones Mill in 1909. It was named for the owner of the local grist mill. Four years later on November 4, 1913, the town was renamed as Roy for Roy Megargel, owner of the Gulf, Florida, and Alabama Railroad (GFA). The renaming was done on the condition that Megargel would build a rail line to the town.

When Megargel failed to deliver on his promise, the town reverted to its name of Jones Mill in 1919 (also referred to as Jones Mills plural). Megargel failed to keep his name on Jones Mill, but later received another community named for him, that of nearby Megargel, a census-designated place as of 2010.

In 1925, the Frisco Railroad bought the GFA Railroad and agreed to complete what Megargel was not able to. In October 1928, the line was completed, and in gratitude, the town formally renamed itself as Frisco City.

=== Climate ===
Climate is characterized by relatively high temperatures and evenly distributed precipitation throughout the year. The Köppen Climate Classification sub-type for this climate is "Cfa" (Humid Subtropical Climate).

== Demographics ==
Historical population
Census	Pop.	Note	%±
1910	442		—
1920	576		30.3%
1930	1,021		77.3%
1940	994		−2.6%
1950	1,068		7.4%
1960	1,177		10.2%
1970	1,286		9.3%
1980	1,424		10.7%
1990	1,581		11.0%
2000	1,460		−7.7%
2010	1,309		−10.3%
2020	1,170		−10.6%
2022 (est.)	1,139	▼	−2.6%
U.S. Decennial Census; 2020 Census

=== Racial and ethnic composition ===
Frisco City town, Alabama – Racial and ethnic composition Note: the US Census treats Hispanic/Latino as an ethnic category. This table excludes Latinos from the racial categories and assigns them to a separate category. Hispanics/Latinos may be of any race. Race and ethnicity was not surveyed for populations under 2,500 in the 1980 census and under 1,000 in 1990 census.
Race / Ethnicity (NH = Non-Hispanic)	Pop 1990	Pop 2000	Pop 2010	Pop 2020	% 1990	% 2000	% 2010	% 2020
White alone (NH)	1,119	769	589	485	70.78%	52.67%	45.00%	41.45%
Black or African American alone (NH)	430	635	643	605	27.20%	43.49%	49.12%	51.71%
Native American or Alaska Native alone (NH)	20	18	17	11	1.27%	1.23%	1.30%	0.94%
Asian alone (NH)	0	6	0	3	0.00%	0.41%	0.00%	0.26%
Native Hawaiian or Pacific Islander alone (NH)	x	0	0	0	x	0.00%	0.00%	0.00%
Other race alone (NH)	0	1	0	1	0.00%	0.07%	0.00%	0.09%
Mixed race or Multiracial (NH)	x	14	37	53	x	0.96%	2.83%	4.53%
Hispanic or Latino (any race)	12	17	23	12	0.76%	1.16%	1.76%	1.03%
Total	1,581	1,460	1,309	1,170	100.00%	100.00%	100.00%	100.00%

=== 2020 census ===
As of the 2020 census, Frisco City had a population of 1,170. The median age was 43.6 years. 21.4% of residents were under the age of 18 and 20.2% were 65 years of age or older. For every 100 females there were 97.0 males, and for every 100 females age 18 and over there were 89.7 males.

0.0% of residents lived in urban areas, while 100.0% lived in rural areas.

There were 520 households and 331 families in Frisco City. Of all households, 29.4% had children under the age of 18 living with them, 35.0% were married-couple households, 20.0% were households with a male householder and no spouse or partner present, and 41.0% were households with a female householder and no spouse or partner present. About 33.1% of all households were made up of individuals and 14.8% had someone living alone who was 65 years of age or older.

There were 579 housing units, of which 10.2% were vacant. The homeowner vacancy rate was 0.3% and the rental vacancy rate was 7.1%.

=== 2010 census ===
As of the 2010 census, there were 1,309 people, 531 households, and 352 families in the town. The population density was 326 inhabitants per square mile (126/km^{2}). There were 623 housing units at an average density of 155.8 per square mile (60.2/km^{2}). The racial makeup of the town was 49.3% Black or African American, 45.4% White, 1.3% Native American, 0.0% Asian, 0.8% from other races, and 2.8% from two or more races. 1.8% of the population were Hispanic or Latino of any race.

Of the 531 households 27.5% had children under the age of 18 living with them, 39.0% were married couples living together, 22.6% had a female householder with no husband present, and 33.7% were non-families. 29.2% of households were one person and 9.3% were one person aged 65 or older. The average household size was 2.47 and the average family size was 3.07.

The age distribution was 25.4% under the age of 18, 7.6% from 18 to 24, 22.5% from 25 to 44, 28.5% from 45 to 64, and 16.0% 65 or older. The median age was 40.7 years. For every 100 females, there were 85.4 males. For every 100 females age 18 and over, there were 85.5 males.

The median household income was $23,884 and the median family income was $28,512. Males had a median income of $32,917 versus $19,327 for females. The per capita income for the town was $12,181. About 34.6% of families and 38.3% of the population were below the poverty line, including 60.7% of those under age 18 and 19.2% of those age 65 or over.

=== 2000 census ===
As of the 2000 census, there were 1,460 people, 589 households, and 405 families in the town. The population density was 361.9 inhabitants per square mile (139.7/km^{2}). There were 665 housing units at an average density of 164.8 per square mile (63.6/km^{2}). The racial makeup of the town was 52.95% White, 43.56% Black or African American, 1.51% Native American, 0.41% Asian, 0.48% from other races, and 1.10% from two or more races. 1.16% of the population were Hispanic or Latino of any race.

Of the 589 households 35.1% had children under the age of 18 living with them, 45.0% were married couples living together, 19.5% had a female householder with no husband present, and 31.1% were non-families. 30.1% of households were one person and 14.9% were one person aged 65 or older. The average household size was 2.48 and the average family size was 3.07.

The age distribution was 29.3% under the age of 18, 8.5% from 18 to 24, 27.1% from 25 to 44, 21.9% from 45 to 64, and 13.2% 65 or older. The median age was 35 years. For every 100 females, there were 84.3 males. For every 100 females age 18 and over, there were 80.1 males.

The median household income was $26,176 and the median family income was $32,663. Males had a median income of $26,898 versus $19,464 for females. The per capita income for the town was $12,170. About 19.5% of families and 25.5% of the population were below the poverty line, including 32.8% of those under age 18 and 29.7% of those age 65 or over.

== Notable person ==
- Alfred Malone, professional football player
