= Monroe County, Alabama =

County in Alabama, United States

- County
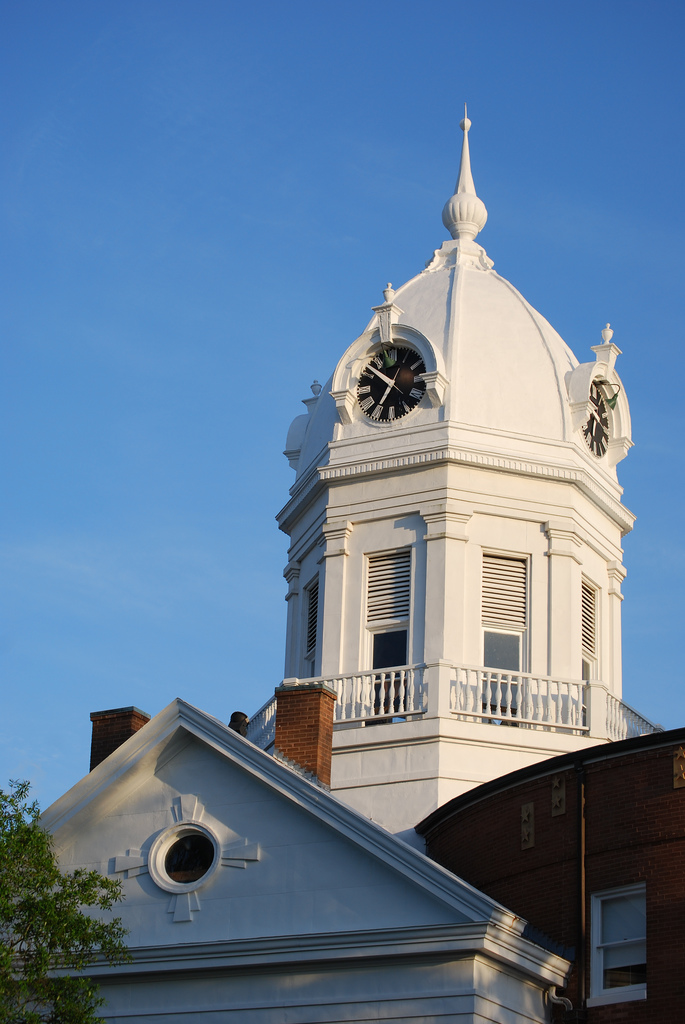
- The Old Monroe County Courthouse in Monroeville

- Location within the U.S. state of Alabama
- Coordinates: 31°34′15″N 87°22′11″W
- Country: United States
- State: Alabama
- Founded: June 29, 1815
- Named for: James Monroe
- Seat: Monroeville
- Largest city: Monroeville

Area
  - Total: 1,034 sq mi (2,680 km^{2})
  - Land: 1,026 sq mi (2,660 km^{2})
  - Water: 8.7 sq mi (23 km^{2}) 0.8%

Population (2020)
  - Total: 19,772
  - Estimate (2025): 18,965 ▼
  - Density: 19.27/sq mi (7.441/km^{2})
- Time zone: UTC−6 (Central)
  - Summer (DST): UTC−5 (CDT)
- Congressional district: 2nd
- Website: www.monroecountyal.com
- County Number 51 on Alabama Licence Plates

Monroe County is a county located in the southwestern part of the U.S. state of Alabama. As of the 2020 census, the population was 19,772. Its county seat is Monroeville. Its name is in honor of James Monroe, fifth President of the United States. It is a dry county, in which the sale of alcoholic beverages is restricted or prohibited, but Frisco City and Monroeville are wet cities.

In 1997, the Alabama Legislature designated Monroeville and Monroe County as the "Literary Capital of Alabama". It is the birthplace of notable writer Harper Lee and served as the childhood home for Truman Capote, her lifelong friend and a fellow writer. Lee lived here most of her life. The enduring popularity of her novel, To Kill a Mockingbird (1960), as well as its film and stage adaptations, has attracted tourists to the city and area. Monroeville is also central to the 2019 film Just Mercy, based upon the 2014 eponymous book by Bryan Stevenson, recounting the wrongful conviction and sentencing to death of African American Walter McMillian.

== History ==
For thousands of years the area was inhabited by indigenous peoples. In historic times, it was primarily the territory of the Muscogee or Creek peoples, who became known to European-American settlers as one of the Five Civilized Tribes of the Southeast.

The prominent Upper Creek chief Red Eagle (also known as William Weatherford), of the Wind Clan, settled here after the Creek War (1813–1814). At the time, the United States was also involved in the War of 1812 against Great Britain. Red Eagle established a successful cotton plantation. He was of Creek and European descent, and had adopted the system of chattel slavery to gain workers for his plantation and horse breeding. In the 1830s the United States forced the removal of most of the Creek people from Alabama to Indian Territory (now Oklahoma), in order to take over their territory.

The area was settled by European Americans, primarily of English and Scots-Irish descent. It was largely developed as cotton plantations in the antebellum years. Planters moving from the Upper South sometimes brought slave workers with them, or purchased more slaves from traders and markets after acquiring land. The population was made up of numerous slaves, who in some sections outnumbered the whites.

Following the American Civil War and Emancipation, in the period after the Reconstruction era and into the early 20th century, white Democrats regained control of the state legislature and worked to restore and maintain white supremacy. The legislature passed a new constitution in 1901 that disenfranchised most blacks and tens of thousands of poor whites, excluding them from the political system. The legislators also passed laws imposing racial segregation and other forms of Jim Crow, and centralized power in the legislature.

=== Late 19th century to present ===
Physical violence by whites against blacks was part of the oppressive social system. Racial terrorism was perpetrated through lynchings of African Americans, mostly of men, which took place outside the justice system. They were often conducted as public displays on the courthouse square, spectacles attended by large white mobs in an enactment of their power. Monroe had a total of seventeen lynchings from 1877 to 1950, the second highest number of any county in Alabama.

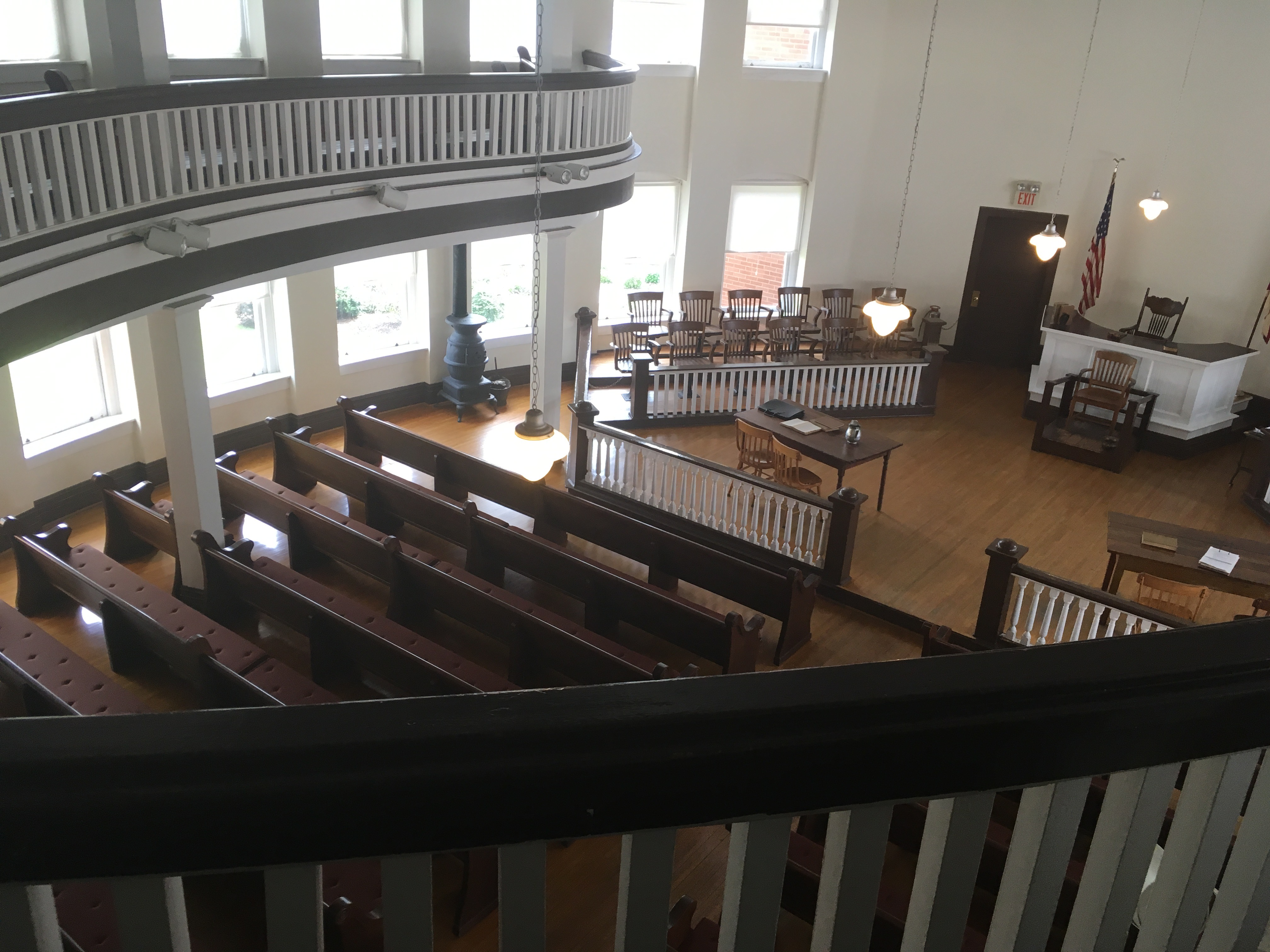
Old Monroe County Courthouse in Harper Lee's hometown of Monroeville, the model for the courthouse used in the movie

The county seat, Monroeville, is the home of two notable 20th-century authors, Truman Capote and Nelle Harper Lee, who were childhood neighbors. The novelist Mark Childress and journalist Cynthia Tucker are also Monroe County natives. In 1997 the Alabama Legislature designated Monroeville and Monroe County as the "Literary Capital of Alabama".

The county is near the Gulf Coast and is affected by storms from the Gulf. It has twice been declared a disaster area by the federal government due to extensive hurricane damage: in September 1979 due to Hurricane Frederic, and in September 2004 due to Hurricane Ivan.

Attorney Bryan Stevenson published his memoir, Just Mercy: A Story of Justice and Redemption in 2014. He has worked since his early 20s in Montgomery, establishing the Equal Justice Initiative and serving as legal counsel for people on death row in Alabama prisons. He has succeeded in gaining freedom for more than 100 men who were wrongfully convicted. Among the cases he discusses is that of Walter McMillian of Monroeville, who was wrongfully convicted of murder in 1989. McMillian, an African American man, was sentenced to death by the trial judge, who overrode the lesser sentence reached by the jury. McMillian was kept on death row for 6 years, nearly 2 of which were prior to his trial, in an effort to make him confess. In 1993 the Alabama Appeals Court ruled that McMillian should be freed because of the lack of evidence, his alibi, the unreliability of witnesses, and mishandling of the trial.

== Geography ==
According to the United States Census Bureau, the county has a total area of 1,034 square miles (2,680 km^{2}), of which 1,026 square miles (2,660 km^{2}) is land and 8.7 square miles (23 km^{2}) (0.8%) is water.

=== Major highways ===
- U.S. Highway 84 / State Route 12 (unsigned)
- State Route 21
- State Route 41
- State Route 47
- State Route 59
- State Route 83
- State Route 136

=== Adjacent counties ===
- Wilcox County (north)
- Butler County (east-northeast)
- Conecuh County (east)
- Escambia County (southeast)
- Baldwin County (southwest)
- Clarke County (west)

== Demographics ==
Historical population
Census	Pop.	Note	%±
1820	8,838		—
1830	8,782		−0.6%
1840	10,680		21.6%
1850	12,013		12.5%
1860	15,667		30.4%
1870	14,214		−9.3%
1880	17,091		20.2%
1890	18,990		11.1%
1900	23,666		24.6%
1910	27,155		14.7%
1920	28,884		6.4%
1930	30,070		4.1%
1940	29,465		−2.0%
1950	25,732		−12.7%
1960	22,372		−13.1%
1970	20,883		−6.7%
1980	22,651		8.5%
1990	23,968		5.8%
2000	24,324		1.5%
2010	23,068		−5.2%
2020	19,772		−14.3%
2025 (est.)	18,965	▼	−4.1%
U.S. Decennial Census; 1790–1960 1900–1990; 1990–2000 2010–2020

=== Racial and ethnic composition ===
Monroe County, Alabama – Racial and ethnic composition Note: the US Census treats Hispanic/Latino as an ethnic category. This table excludes Latinos from the racial categories and assigns them to a separate category. Hispanics/Latinos may be of any race.
Race / Ethnicity (NH = Non-Hispanic)	Pop 2000	Pop 2010	Pop 2020	% 2000	% 2010	% 2020
White alone (NH)	13,962	12,621	10,334	57.40%	54.71%	52.27%
Black or African American alone (NH)	9,683	9,581	8,253	39.81%	41.53%	41.74%
Native American or Alaska Native alone (NH)	232	256	281	0.95%	1.11%	1.42%
Asian alone (NH)	69	67	88	0.28%	0.29%	0.45%
Pacific Islander alone (NH)	1	4	0	0.00%	0.02%	0.00%
Other race alone (NH)	13	8	44	0.05%	0.03%	0.22%
Mixed race or Multiracial (NH)	174	311	565	0.72%	1.35%	2.86%
Hispanic or Latino (any race)	190	220	207	0.78%	0.95%	1.05%
Total	24,324	23,068	19,772	100.00%	100.00%	100.00%

=== 2020 census ===
As of the 2020 census, the county had a population of 19,772. The median age was 44.1 years. 21.3% of residents were under the age of 18 and 20.6% of residents were 65 years of age or older. For every 100 females there were 92.6 males, and for every 100 females age 18 and over there were 88.6 males age 18 and over.

The racial makeup of the county was 52.6% White, 42.0% Black or African American, 1.5% American Indian and Alaska Native, 0.4% Asian, 0.0% Native Hawaiian and Pacific Islander, 0.4% from some other race, and 3.2% from two or more races. Hispanic or Latino residents of any race comprised 1.0% of the population.

21.7% of residents lived in urban areas, while 78.3% lived in rural areas.

There were 8,337 households in the county, of which 28.5% had children under the age of 18 living with them and 34.3% had a female householder with no spouse or partner present. About 31.3% of all households were made up of individuals and 14.5% had someone living alone who was 65 years of age or older.

There were 10,127 housing units, of which 17.7% were vacant. Among occupied housing units, 74.8% were owner-occupied and 25.2% were renter-occupied. The homeowner vacancy rate was 1.7% and the rental vacancy rate was 8.6%.

=== 2010 ===
According to the 2010 United States census:

- 55.1% White
- 41.7% Black
- 1.1% Native American
- 0.3% Asian
- 0.0% Native Hawaiian or Pacific Islander
- 1.4% Two or more ethnicities
- 1.0% Hispanic or Latino (of any ethnicity)

=== 2000 ===
As of the census of 2000, there were 24,324 people, 9,383 households and 6,774 families residing in the county. The population density was 24 people per square mile (9.3 people/km^{2}). There were 11,343 housing units at an average density of 11 units per square mile (4.2 units/km^{2}). The ethnic makeup of the county was 57.75% White, 40.07% Black or African American, 0.97% Native American, 0.29% Asian, 0.01% Pacific Islander, 0.13% from other races, and 0.79% from two or more ethnicities while 0.78% of the population were Hispanic or Latino of any ethnicity.

There were 9,383 households, out of which 35.60% had children under the age of 18 living with them, 52.30% married couples living together, 16.10% with a female householder and no husband present and 27.80% non-families. Slightly more than a quarter (25.70%) of all households were made up of individuals, and 11.10% had someone living alone who was 65 years of age or older. The average household size was 2.57 and the average family size was 3.09.

In the county, the population was spread out, with 28.30% under the age of 18, 8.60% from 18 to 24, 26.80% from 25 to 44, 22.50% from 45 to 64, and 13.80% who were 65 years of age or older. The median age was 35 years old. For every 100 females, there were 90.80 males. For every 100 females, aged 18 and over, there were 86.40 males.

The median income for a household in the county was $29,093, and the median income for a family was $34,569. Males had a median income of $31,096 versus $18,767 for females. The per capita income for the county was $14,862. About 18.20% of families and 21.30% of the population were below the poverty line, including 27.00% of those under age 18 and 21.40% of those aged 65 or over.

== Politics ==
Monroe County is a reliably Republican county. The last Democrat to win the county was Jimmy Carter in 1976.

United States presidential election results for Monroe County, Alabama
Year	Republican		Democratic		Third party(ies)	
Year	No.	%	No.	%	No.	%
1824	120	20.91%	419	73.00%	35	6.10%
1828	70	9.38%	676	90.62%	0	0.00%
1832	0	0.00%	336	100.00%	0	0.00%
1836	447	59.28%	307	40.72%	0	0.00%
1840	646	64.15%	361	35.85%	0	0.00%
1844	567	61.23%	359	38.77%	0	0.00%
1848	479	68.92%	216	31.08%	0	0.00%
1852	264	46.40%	260	45.69%	45	7.91%
1856	0	0.00%	604	56.29%	469	43.71%
1860	0	0.00%	222	18.52%	977	81.48%
1868	58	4.63%	1,196	95.37%	0	0.00%
1872	481	25.05%	1,439	74.95%	0	0.00%
1876	606	28.34%	1,532	71.66%	0	0.00%
1880	821	43.03%	1,087	56.97%	0	0.00%
1884	794	41.68%	1,111	58.32%	0	0.00%
1888	767	34.67%	1,445	65.33%	0	0.00%
1892	8	0.31%	1,850	72.35%	699	27.34%
1900	145	13.58%	909	85.11%	14	1.31%
1904	46	5.16%	836	93.72%	10	1.12%
1908	18	2.03%	856	96.61%	12	1.35%
1912	2	0.22%	878	97.12%	24	2.65%
1916	17	1.62%	1,029	98.09%	3	0.29%
1920	20	1.51%	1,295	97.52%	13	0.98%
1924	22	1.83%	1,155	96.09%	25	2.08%
1928	1,074	44.44%	1,343	55.56%	0	0.00%
1932	66	3.23%	1,972	96.52%	5	0.24%
1936	29	1.12%	2,558	98.54%	9	0.35%
1940	40	1.33%	2,953	98.17%	15	0.50%
1944	46	2.25%	1,991	97.55%	4	0.20%
1948	31	1.80%	0	0.00%	1,694	98.20%
1952	637	19.72%	2,587	80.07%	7	0.22%
1956	759	25.66%	2,069	69.95%	130	4.39%
1960	989	31.37%	2,130	67.55%	34	1.08%
1964	3,870	81.37%	0	0.00%	886	18.63%
1968	375	5.12%	1,673	22.84%	5,276	72.04%
1972	5,155	74.82%	1,636	23.74%	99	1.44%
1976	3,476	47.86%	3,669	50.52%	118	1.62%
1980	4,615	50.87%	4,262	46.98%	195	2.15%
1984	5,917	60.65%	3,725	38.18%	114	1.17%
1988	5,379	60.07%	3,509	39.19%	66	0.74%
1992	4,919	50.48%	3,872	39.73%	954	9.79%
1996	4,382	50.38%	3,815	43.86%	501	5.76%
2000	5,153	57.57%	3,741	41.79%	57	0.64%
2004	5,831	61.16%	3,666	38.45%	37	0.39%
2008	6,175	54.88%	5,025	44.66%	52	0.46%
2012	5,741	53.57%	4,914	45.85%	62	0.58%
2016	5,795	56.42%	4,332	42.18%	144	1.40%
2020	6,147	57.62%	4,455	41.76%	66	0.62%
2024	6,007	61.20%	3,740	38.10%	68	0.69%

United States Senate election results for Monroe County, Alabama2
Year	Republican		Democratic		Third party(ies)	
Year	No.	%	No.	%	No.	%
2020	5,906	55.50%	4,719	44.35%	16	0.15%

United States Senate election results for Monroe County, Alabama3
Year	Republican		Democratic		Third party(ies)	
Year	No.	%	No.	%	No.	%
2022	4,270	60.77%	2,678	38.12%	78	1.11%

Alabama Gubernatorial election results for Monroe County
Year	Republican		Democratic		Third party(ies)	
Year	No.	%	No.	%	No.	%
2022	4,313	61.23%	2,609	37.04%	122	1.73%

== Communities ==
=== City ===
- Monroeville (county seat)

=== Towns ===
- Beatrice
- Excel
- Frisco City
- Vredenburgh

=== Census-designated places ===
- Megargel
- Peterman
- Uriah

=== Unincorporated communities ===
- Buena Vista
- Burnt Corn
- Finchburg
- Franklin
- Goodway
- Hybart
- Manistee
- Mexia
- Natchez
- Old Salem
- Old Texas
- Perdue Hill
- River Ridge
- Scratch Ankle
- Tunnel Springs
- Vocation
- Wainwright

=== Ghost town ===
- Claiborne
- Jeddo – Located at the intersection of County Road 8 (Jeddo Road) and Rocky Hill Road
- Nadawah

== Education ==
There is one school district in the county: Monroe County School District.

== Places of interest ==
Monroe County is home to several attractions, such as the Alabama River Museum, the Monroe County Heritage Museum, and the Courthouse Museum which hosts the annual stage production of To Kill a Mockingbird. The county also contains Claude Kelly State Park.

== See also ==
- National Register of Historic Places listings in Monroe County, Alabama
- Properties on the Alabama Register of Landmarks and Heritage in Monroe County, Alabama
