= Beatrice, Alabama =

- Town
- Rikard's Mill in Beatrice

- Flag Seal

- Location in Monroe County, Alabama
- Coordinates: 31°44′00″N 87°12′33″W
- Country: United States
- State: Alabama
- County: Monroe

Government
  - Type: Mayor-Council
  - Mayor: Annie Shelton

Area
  - Total: 1.35 sq mi (3.50 km^{2})
  - Land: 1.35 sq mi (3.50 km^{2})
  - Water: 0 sq mi (0.00 km^{2})
- Elevation: 236 ft (72 m)

Population (2020)
  - Total: 204
  - Density: 150.8/sq mi (58.23/km^{2})
- Time zone: UTC-6 (Central (CST))
  - Summer (DST): UTC-5 (CDT)
- ZIP code: 36425
- Area code: 251
- FIPS code: 01-04900
- GNIS feature ID: 2405221
- Website: beatriceal.com

Beatrice /biːˈætrɪs/ is a town in Monroe County, Alabama, United States. It incorporated in 1901. At the 2020 census the population was 204, down from 301 in 2010 and 412 in 2000.

== Geography ==
Beatrice is located in northern Monroe County at 31°43′59″N 87°12′24″W (31.733178, -87.206773). Alabama State Routes 21 and 47 pass through the town. Together they lead southwest 17 miles (27 km) to Monroeville, the county seat, and east 5 miles (8 km) to Riley. State Route 265 leads north from Beatrice 20 miles (32 km) to Camden.

According to the U.S. Census Bureau, Beatrice has a total area of 1.4 square miles (3.6 km^{2}), all land.

== Demographics ==
Historical population
Census	Pop.	Note	%±
1910	345		—
1920	293		−15.1%
1930	342		16.7%
1940	410		19.9%
1950	375		−8.5%
1960	506		34.9%
1970	455		−10.1%
1980	558		22.6%
1990	454		−18.6%
2000	412		−9.3%
2010	301		−26.9%
2020	204		−32.2%
U.S. Decennial Census; 2013 Estimate

=== 2020 census ===
Beatrice town, Alabama – Racial and ethnic composition Note: the US Census treats Hispanic/Latino as an ethnic category. This table excludes Latinos from the racial categories and assigns them to a separate category. Hispanics/Latinos may be of any race.
Race / Ethnicity (NH = Non-Hispanic)	Pop 2010	Pop 2020	% 2010	% 2020
White alone (NH)	71	61	23.59%	29.90%
Black or African American alone (NH)	229	135	76.08%	66.18%
Native American or Alaska Native alone (NH)	1	0	0.33%	0.00%
Asian alone (NH)	0	0	0.00%	0.00%
Pacific Islander alone (NH)	0	0	0.00%	0.00%
Some Other Race alone (NH)	0	0	0.00%	0.00%
Mixed Race/Multi-Racial (NH)	0	6	0.00%	2.94%
Hispanic or Latino (any race)	0	2	0.00%	0.98%
Total	301	204	100.00%	100.00%

As of the census of 2000, there were 412 people, 158 households, and 106 families residing in the town. The population density was 304.8 inhabitants per square mile (117.7/km^{2}). There were 203 housing units at an average density of 150.2 per square mile (58.0/km^{2}). The racial makeup of the town was 26.94% White, 72.57% Black or African American, 0.24% Native American and 0.24% Pacific Islander. 0.49% of the population were Hispanic or Latino of any race.

There were 158 households, out of which 32.9% had children under the age of 18 living with them, 36.1% were married couples living together, 25.3% had a female householder with no husband present, and 32.3% were non-families. 29.7% of all households were made up of individuals, and 18.4% had someone living alone who was 65 years of age or older. The average household size was 2.61 and the average family size was 3.17.

In the town, the population was spread out, with 28.9% under the age of 18, 9.7% from 18 to 24, 20.6% from 25 to 44, 21.4% from 45 to 64, and 19.4% who were 65 years of age or older. The median age was 38 years. For every 100 females, there were 89.0 males. For every 100 females age 18 and over, there were 84.3 males.

The median income for a household in the town was $15,833, and the median income for a family was $15,625. Males had a median income of $30,417 versus $15,469 for females. The per capita income for the town was $8,661. About 39.6% of families and 44.4% of the population were below the poverty line, including 54.5% of those under age 18 and 29.2% of those age 65 or over.

== Education ==
Beatrice has one school local to the town region, J.F. Shields High School. The school has approximately 260 students, living in Beatrice and other nearby towns. The school maintains a Student-Teacher ratio of 15:1, rating in the top 20% of the Alabama state. The school marks with the ACT test.

== Notable people ==
- Butch Avinger, former NFL player
- John Drew, former NBA player (Atlanta Hawks), graduate of J. F. Shields
- Thad McClammy, politician
