= List of places in Alabama: D–H =

This list of current cities, towns, unincorporated communities, counties, and other recognized places in the U.S. state of Alabama also includes information on the number of counties in which the place lies, the name of its principal county, and its lower and upper ZIP Code bounds, if applicable.

== See also ==
- Alabama
- List of cities in Alabama
- List of counties in Alabama

== D ==
Name of place	Number of counties	Principal county	Lower zip code	Upper zip code
Dadeville	1	Tallapoosa County	36853	
Daisey City	1	Jefferson County		
Daisy	1	Butler County		
Daisy	1	Etowah County		
Daleville	1	Dale County	36322	
Dallas	1	Blount County	35172	
Dallas	1	Madison County		
Damascus	1	Coffee County	36323	
Damascus	1	Cullman County		
Damascus	1	Escambia County	36426	
Dancy	1	Pickens County	35442	
Danielsville	1	Crenshaw County		
Danley	1	Coffee County	36323	
Danleys Crossroads	1	Coffee County		
Dannelly Field	1	Montgomery County	36103	
Danville	1	Jefferson County	35217	
Danville	1	Morgan County	35619	
Danway	1	Chambers County	36801	
Danzey	1	Henry County		
Daphne	1	Baldwin County	36526	27
Dargin	1	Shelby County	35040	
Darlington	1	Wilcox County	36726	
Darrah	1	Hale County		
Darwin Downs	1	Madison County		
Dauphin Island	1	Mobile County	36528	
Dauphin Island Air Force Station	1	Mobile County	36528	
Davenport	2	Lowndes County	36047	
Davenport	2	Montgomery County	36047	
Davis Crossroads	1	Montgomery County		
Davis Hills	1	Madison County		
Daviston	1	Tallapoosa County	36256	
Davistown	1	Jackson County		
Davisville	1	Macon County	36083	
Dawes	1	Mobile County	36601	
Dawson	1	DeKalb County	35963	
Dayton	1	Marengo County	36731	
Deans	1	Conecuh County		
DeArmanville	1	Calhoun County	36257	
Deas	1	Choctaw County		
Deason Hill	1	Walker County	35550	
Deatsville	1	Elmore County	36022	
Deavers Town	1	Blount County		
Deavertown	1	Blount County	35049	
De Bardeleben	1	Walker County		
Decatur	2	Limestone County	35601	
Decatur	2	Morgan County	35601	
Decatur Junction	1	Limestone County		
Deerhurst	1	Shelby County		
Deer Park	1	Washington County	36529	
Deer Range	1	Conecuh County		
DeFoor	1	Winston County	35565	
Delchamps	1	Mobile County	36523	
Dells Vista Shores	1	Lauderdale County		
Delma	1	Pickens County		
Delmar	1	Winston County	35551	
Delta	1	Clay County	36258	
Demopolis	1	Marengo County	36732	
Dempsey	1	Franklin County	35653	
Denson	1	Chambers County		
Denver	1	Tallapoosa County		
Deposit	1	Madison County	35761	
Derby	1	Sumter County		
Detroit	1	Lamar County	35552	
Devenport	2	Lowndes County	36047	
Devenport	2	Montgomery County	36047	
Dewey	1	Cherokee County		
Dexter	1	Elmore County	36092	
Diamond	1	Marshall County	35976	
Dickenson	1	Clarke County		
Dickert	1	Randolph County	36276	
Dickinson	1	Clarke County	36436	
Dill	1	Dale County		
Dillard	1	Dale County	36360	
Dillburg	1	Pickens County		
Dilworth	1	Walker County	35063	
Dime	1	Franklin County	36727	
Dingler	1	Randolph County		
Divide	1	Jefferson County		
Dixacon	1	Bullock County		
Dixiana	1	Jefferson County	35126	
Dixie	1	Chilton County		
Dixie	1	Escambia County	36420	
Dixie	1	Walker County		
Dixieland	1	Russell County	36867	
Dixieland Junction	1	Russell County		
Dixie Springs	1	Walker County		
Dixon Corner	1	Mobile County	36544	
Dixon Shop	1	Cherokee County		
Dixons Mills	1	Marengo County	36736	
Dixonville	1	Escambia County	36426	
Docena	1	Jefferson County	35060	
Dock	1	Butler County	36037	
Docray	1	Tuscaloosa County		
Dodge City	1	Cullman County	35077	
Dogtown	1	DeKalb County		
Dogtown	1	Walker County	35549	
Dogwood	1	DeKalb County	35967	
Dogwood	1	Shelby County		
Dolcito	1	Jefferson County	35217	
Doliska	1	Walker County	35130	
D'Olive	1	Baldwin County		
Dollar	1	Coosa County		
Dolomite	1	Jefferson County	35061	
Dolonah	1	Jefferson County	35023	
Dolonar Junction	1	Jefferson County		
Donaldson Mill	1	Winston County		
Dora	1	Walker County	35062	
Dora Junction	1	Walker County		
Doster	1	Barbour County	36311	
Dosterville	1	Autauga County		
Dothan	3	Dale County	36301	
Dothan	3	Henry County	36301	
Dothan	3	Houston County	36301	
Dothan Airport	1	Houston County	36303	
Double Bridges	1	Henry County	36310	
Double Bridges	1	Marshall County	35957	
Doublehead	1	Chambers County	36855	
Double Springs	1	Winston County	35553	
Douglas	1	DeKalb County	35967	
Douglas	1	Marshall County	35964	
Douglasville	1	Baldwin County		
Douglasville	1	Jefferson County		
Dove	1	Sumter County		
Dovertown	1	Walker County		
Dowdle	1	Tuscaloosa County		
Downing	1	Montgomery County	36052	
Downs	1	Macon County	36039	
Downtown	1	Madison County	35801	
Downtown	1	Montgomery County	36104	
Downtown	1	Tuscaloosa County	35402	
Dozier	1	Crenshaw County	36028	
Drewry	1	Monroe County	36460	
Drifton	1	Walker County		
Dripping Springs	1	Cullman County		
Drummond	1	Walker County	35063	
Dry Forks	1	Wilcox County	36726	
Dry Valley	1	Talladega County	35096	
Dublin	1	Montgomery County	36069	
Duck Springs	1	Etowah County	35954	
Dudley	1	Tuscaloosa County	35490	
Dudleyville	1	Tallapoosa County	36850	
Dug Hill	1	Madison County		
Duke	1	Calhoun County	36279	
Duketon	1	Franklin County		
Dulin	1	Marion County	35594	
Dunnavant	1	Shelby County		
Dunbar	1	Washington County		
Duncan	1	Jefferson County		
Duncan Crossroads	1	Jackson County	35771	
Duncanville	1	Tuscaloosa County	35456	
Dundee	1	Geneva County	36344	
Dunn	1	Pike County	36081	
Dunns	1	Covington County	36420	
Dupree	1	Houston County	36312	
Dupree	1	Lee County		
Dutton	1	Jackson County	35744	
Duvall	1	Covington County	36467	
Dwight	1	Washington County		
Dyas	1	Baldwin County	36507	
Dyers Crossroads	1	Cullman County	35055	
Dykes Crossroad	1	Dale County		

== E ==
Name of place	Number of counties	Principal county	Lower zip code	Upper zip code
Eady City	1	Chambers County	36854	
Eagle	1	Winston County		
Earlytown	1	Geneva County	36453	
Easley	1	Blount County		
Easonville	1	St. Clair County		
Eastaboga	2	Calhoun County	36260	
Eastaboga	2	Talladega County	36260	
East Birmingham	1	Jefferson County		
East Boyles	1	Jefferson County		
East Brewton	1	Escambia County	36426	
East Brighton	1	Jefferson County		
Eastbrook	1	Montgomery County	36109	
East Brookwood	1	Tuscaloosa County	35444	
East Chapman	1	Butler County		
Eastdale	1	Montgomery County	36117	
Eastern Valley	1	Jefferson County	35023	
East Florence	1	Lauderdale County	35633	
East Gadsden	1	Etowah County	35903	
East Hampton	1	Limestone County	35611	
East Haven	1	Jefferson County	35215	
East Irondale	1	Jefferson County	35210	
East Killen	1	Lauderdale County	35645	
East Lake	1	Jefferson County	35206	
East Mill	1	Clay County		
Eastmont	1	Montgomery County		
Easton	1	Tallapoosa County		
East Point	1	Cullman County	35055	
East Royles	1	Jefferson County		
East Saginaw	1	Shelby County		
East Side	1	Tuscaloosa County	35404	
East Tallassee	1	Tallapoosa County	36023	
East Thomas	1	Jefferson County		
East Thomas Gardens	1	Jefferson County		
Eastwood	1	Blount County	35121	
Eastwood	1	Jefferson County		
Ebenezer	1	Cullman County	35179	
Echo	1	Dale County	36353	
Echola	1	Tuscaloosa County	35457	
Echols Crossroads	1	Morgan County	35670	
Echols Hill	1	Madison County		
Echota Cherokee	5	Baldwin County		
Echota Cherokee	5	Bullock County		
Echota Cherokee	5	Cherokee County		
Echota Cherokee	5	Lawrence County		
Echota Cherokee	5	St. Clair County		
Eclectic	1	Elmore County	36024	
Eddins	1	Marengo County		
Eddy	1	Marshall County	35016	
Eden	1	St. Clair County	35125	
Edgefield	1	Barbour County	36016	
Edgefield	1	Jackson County	35772	
Edgemont	1	Jefferson County	35229	
Edgemont Park	1	Jefferson County	35229	
Edgemoor Estates	1	Jefferson County	35229	
Edgewater	1	Jefferson County	35224	
Edgewater Junction	1	Jefferson County		
Edgewood	1	Jefferson County	35229	
Edmonton Heights	1	Madison County		
Edna	1	Choctaw County	36922	
Edsons	1	Lowndes County		
Edwards	1	Macon County		
Edwardsville	1	Cleburne County	36261	
Edwin	1	Henry County	36317	
Egypt	1	Etowah County	35952	
Egypt	1	Marshall County		
Egypt Ford	1	Lawrence County		
Eight Mile	1	Mobile County	36613	
Eiler	1	Choctaw County		
Elamville	1	Barbour County	36311	
Elba	1	Coffee County	36323	
Elberta	1	Baldwin County	36530	
Eldridge	1	Walker County	35554	
Eleanor	1	Dallas County		
Elgin	1	Lauderdale County	35652	
Elias	1	Clay County		
Eliska	1	Monroe County	36480	
Elkmont	1	Limestone County	35620	
Elko	1	Madison County		
Elkwood	1	Madison County	38488	
Ellards	1	Perry County	35034	
Elliotsville	1	Shelby County	35144	
Elliott Crossroads	1	DeKalb County		
Ellis	1	Dallas County		
Ellis Crossroads	1	Lowndes County		
Ellison Crossroads	1	Blount County		
Ellisville	1	Baldwin County	36551	
Ellisville	1	Cherokee County	35960	
Elm Bluff	1	Dallas County		
Elmore	1	Elmore County	36025	
Elon	1	Madison County		
Elrath	1	Cherokee County		
Elrod	1	Tuscaloosa County	35458	
Elsanor	1	Baldwin County	36567	
Elsmeade	1	Montgomery County	36111	
Elting	1	Lauderdale County	35630	
Elvira	1	Shelby County		
Elyton	1	Jefferson County		
Emauhee	1	Talladega County		
Emco	1	Colbert County		
Emco-Listerhill Junction	1	Colbert County		
Emelle	1	Sumter County	35459	
Emerald Shores	1	Lauderdale County	35633	
Emory	1	Choctaw County		
Empire	1	Walker County	35063	
Englewood	1	Tuscaloosa County	35404	
English Village	1	Jefferson County	35223	
English Village	1	Madison County		
Enoe	1	Walker County		
Enon	1	Bullock County	36053	
Enon	1	Cullman County	35179	
Enon	1	Houston County	36376	
Enon	1	Pike County	36005	
Ensley	1	Jefferson County	35218	
Ensley Heights	1	Jefferson County		
Ensley Highlands	1	Jefferson County		
Ensley Junction	1	Jefferson County		
Enterprise	1	Chilton County	36091	
Enterprise	2	Coffee County	36330	
Enterprise	2	Dale County	36330	
Eoda	1	Covington County	36420	
Eoline	1	Bibb County	35042	
Epes	1	Sumter County	35460	
Equality	1	Coosa County	36026	
Erin	1	Clay County	36266	
Erratta	1	Shelby County		
Escatawpa	1	Washington County	35179	
Estelle	1	Wilcox County	36726	
Estes Crossroads	1	Cherokee County	36272	
Estillfork	1	Jackson County	35745	
Estothel	1	Covington County		
Ethel	1	Pike County	36005	
Ethelsville	1	Pickens County	35461	
Ethelville	1	Pickens County	35461	
Etowah	1	Tuscaloosa County		
Euclid Estates	1	Jefferson County	35223	
Eufaula	1	Barbour County	36027	
Eulaton	1	Calhoun County	36203	
Eunola	1	Geneva County	36340	
Eureka	1	Jackson County	35772	
Eutaw	1	Greene County	35462	
Eva	1	Morgan County	35621	
Evansboro	1	Choctaw County	36913	
Evans City	1	Colbert County		
Evansville	1	Hale County	35441	
Everglade	1	Tallapoosa County		
Evergreen	1	Autauga County	36006	
Evergreen	1	Conecuh County	36401	
Ewell	1	Dale County	36360	
Ewing	1	Cherokee County		
Ewing	1	Etowah County		
Ewing Farms	1	Escambia County		
Excel	1	Monroe County	36439	
Exmoor	1	Marengo County	36782	
Exum	1	Jefferson County		
Ezel	1	Pike County		
Ezra	1	Jefferson County		

== F ==
Name of place	Number of counties	Principal county	Lower zip code	Upper zip code
Fabius	1	Jackson County	35966	
Fackler	1	Jackson County	35746	
Fadette	1	Geneva County	36301	
Failetown	1	Clarke County		
Fairdale	1	Bibb County	35042	
Fairfax	1	Chambers County	36854	
Fairfield	1	Covington County	36420	
Fairfield	1	Jefferson County	35064	
Fairfield	1	Lawrence County	35650	
Fairfield Highlands	1	Jefferson County	35064	
Fairfield Village	1	Jefferson County	35064	
Fairford	1	Washington County	36553	
Fairhope	1	Baldwin County	36532	
Fair Meadows	1	Montgomery County		
Fairmount	1	Limestone County	35611	
Fairnelson	1	Conecuh County		
Fairoaks	1	Sumter County	35477	
Fairview	1	Blount County		
Fairview	1	Chilton County	35045	
Fairview	1	Coffee County		
Fairview	1	Conecuh County	36401	
Fairview	1	Cullman County	35055	
Fairview	1	DeKalb County	35963	
Fairview	1	Franklin County		
Fair View	1	Jackson County		
Fairview	1	Jefferson County	35208	
Fairview	1	Limestone County	35611	
Fairview	1	Madison County	35761	
Fairview	1	Marion County	35564	
Fairview	1	Mobile County	36587	
Fairview	1	Morgan County	35601	
Fairview	1	Pickens County		
Fairview	1	St. Clair County	35131	
Fairview	1	Walker County		
Fairview	1	Winston County	35540	
Fairview West	1	Cullman County	35077	
Falakto	1	Chilton County		
Falco	1	Covington County		
Falkner	1	Elmore County		
Falkville	1	Morgan County	35622	
Falliston	1	Shelby County		
Falls City	1	Winston County		
Falls Junction	1	Jefferson County		
Fannie	1	Escambia County	36441	
Farill	1	Cherokee County	35959	
Farley	1	Madison County	35802	
Farmersville	1	Lowndes County	36761	
Farmville	1	Lee County	36801	
Farnell	1	Mobile County		
Fatama	1	Wilcox County	36726	
Faulkner Ford	1	Blount County		
Faunsdale	1	Marengo County	36738	
Faustinas	1	Mobile County		
Fayette	1	Fayette County	35555	
Fayetteville	1	Talladega County	35150	
Fays	1	Elmore County		
Fergusons Cross Roads	1	St. Clair County	35972	
Fernbank	1	Lamar County	35576	
Fern Bank	1	Lamar County		
Fernland	1	Mobile County	36541	
Fernwood Estates	1	Jefferson County	35215	
Ferry Shores	1	Lauderdale County		
Fieldstown	1	Jefferson County	35071	
Finchburg	1	Monroe County	36444	
Finley	1	Chambers County		
Finley Crossing	1	Clarke County	36784	
Fisher Crossroads	1	DeKalb County	35967	
Fishermans Resort	1	Lawrence County		
Fishhead	1	Clay County	36258	
Fishpond	1	Coosa County		
Fish Pond	1	Lawrence County	35643	
Fishtrap	1	Talladega County		
Fishtrap Ford	1	Madison County		
Fisk	1	Madison County	35750	
Fitzpatrick	1	Bullock County	36029	
Five Forks	1	DeKalb County		
Five Points	1	Blount County	35049	
Five Points	1	Chambers County	36855	
Five Points	1	Cleburne County	36264	
Five Points	1	Covington County		
Five Points	1	Dale County	36352	
Five Points	1	Dallas County	36767	
Five Points	1	Elmore County	36025	
Five Points	1	Greene County		
Five Points	1	Houston County	36320	
Five Points	1	Lawrence County	35650	
Five Points	1	Madison County	35801	
Five Points	1	Marshall County	35976	
Five Points	1	Talladega County		
Five Points	1	Walker County	35501	
Five Points East	1	Jefferson County	35210	
Five Points South	1	Jefferson County		
Five Points West	1	Jefferson County		
Flack	1	Dale County		
Flanders	1	DeKalb County		
Flat Creek	2	Jefferson County	35130	
Flat Creek	2	Walker County	35130	
Flat Rock	1	Clay County	36266	
Flat Rock	1	Jackson County	35966	
Flat Top	1	Jefferson County		
Flatwood	1	Montgomery County	36110	
Flatwood	1	Walker County	35549	
Flatwood	1	Wilcox County	36728	
Flatwoods	1	Lowndes County		
Fleetwood	1	Tuscaloosa County	35453	
Fleming Hills	1	Madison County		
Fleming Meadows	1	Madison County		
Flemington Heights	1	Madison County		
Fleta	1	Montgomery County	36043	
Flint City	1	Morgan County	35601	
Flint Hill	1	Jefferson County		
Flippo Ford	1	Jackson County		
Flomaton	1	Escambia County	36441	
Florala	1	Covington County	36442	
Floral Crest	1	Jackson County	35958	
Florence	1	Lauderdale County	35630	33
Florette	1	Morgan County	35670	
Flournoys	1	Russell County		
Flower Hill	1	Lawrence County	35643	
Floyd	1	Elmore County	36024	
Foley	1	Baldwin County	36535	
Folsom	1	Perry County		
Ford City	1	Colbert County	35661	
Fordyce	1	Chambers County		
Forest	1	Pickens County	35461	
Forest Acres	1	Jefferson County		
Forest Brook Estates	1	Jefferson County	35216	
Forestdale	1	Jefferson County	35214	
Forester	1	Autauga County	36067	
Forester Chapel	1	Randolph County	36276	
Forest Hill	1	Mobile County		
Forest Hills	1	Calhoun County	36203	
Forest Hills	1	Jefferson County	35064	
Forest Hills	1	Lauderdale County	35633	
Forest Hills	1	Talladega County	35044	
Forest Home	1	Butler County	36030	
Forest Park	1	Jefferson County		
Forest Park	1	Mobile County		
Forkland	1	Greene County	36740	
Forkville	1	Winston County	35565	
Forney	1	Cherokee County	30124	
Fort Benning	1	Russell County	31905	
Fort Dale	1	Butler County	36037	
Fort Davis	1	Macon County	36031	
Fort Deposit	1	Lowndes County	36032	
Fort Gaines	1	Mobile County		
Fort McClellan	1	Calhoun County	36205	
Fort McDermott	1	Baldwin County		
Fort Mitchell	1	Russell County	36856	
Fort Morgan	1	Baldwin County	36542	
Fort Novosel	2	Coffee County	36362	
Fort Novosel	2	Dale County	36362	
Fort Payne	1	DeKalb County	35967	
Fort Stoddard	1	Mobile County		
Foshee	1	Escambia County		
Fosheeton	1	Tallapoosa County	36250	
Foster Crossroad	1	Randolph County		
Foster Crossroads	1	Chambers County		
Fosters	1	Tuscaloosa County	35463	
Fosters Mill	1	Colbert County		
Fostoria	1	Lowndes County	36737	
Fountain	1	Monroe County	36460	
Fountain Heights	1	Jefferson County		
Fourmile	1	Shelby County	35186	
Four Point	1	Washington County		
Fowler	1	Conecuh County		
Fowler	1	Greene County		
Fowlers Crossroads	1	Fayette County	35542	
Fowler Spring	1	Blount County		
Fowl River	1	Mobile County	36582	
Fox	1	Tuscaloosa County	35404	
Frances Heights	1	Jefferson County	35068	
Francis	1	Calhoun County		
Francisco	1	Jackson County	37345	
Francis Mill	1	Calhoun County	36271	
Frankfort	1	Franklin County	35653	
Franklin	1	Macon County	36083	
Franklin	1	Monroe County	36444	
Franklin Ford	1	DeKalb County		
Franklin Gardens	1	Jefferson County		
Frankville	1	Washington County	36538	
Fredonia	1	Chambers County	36855	
Freeman Acres	1	Lawrence County		
Freemanville	1	Escambia County	36502	
Fremont	1	Autauga County	36749	
French Mill	1	Limestone County	35611	
Fresco	1	Coffee County	36010	
Fridays Crossing	1	Blount County	35121	
Friendship	1	Covington County	36467	
Friendship	1	Elmore County	36078	
Friendship	1	Marshall County		
Friendship	1	Montgomery County		
Frisco	1	Coffee County		
Frisco City	1	Monroe County	36445	
Frisco Quarters	1	Walker County		
Frit	1	Dale County		
Frog Eye	1	Tallapoosa County		
Frog Mountain	1	Cherokee County		
Frog Pond	1	Lauderdale County		
Frost	1	Bibb County	35042	
Fruitdale	1	Washington County, Fayette County	36539	
Fruithurst	1	Cleburne County	36262	
Fuller Crossroad	1	Randolph County		
Fullers Crossroads	1	Crenshaw County	36049	
Fullerton	1	Cherokee County	35973	
Fulton	1	Clarke County	36446	
Fulton Bridge	1	Marion County	35570	
Fultondale	1	Jefferson County	35068	
Fulton Road	1	Mobile County	36605	
Fulton Springs	1	Jefferson County	35068	
Furman	1	Wilcox County	36741	
Furnace Junction	1	Lauderdale County		
Fyffe	1	DeKalb County	35971	

== G ==
Name of place	Number of counties	Principal county	Lower zip code	Upper zip code
Gadsden	1	Etowah County	35901	99
Gadsden Municipal Airport	1	Etowah County	35904	
Gainer	1	Geneva County	36477	
Gainestown	1	Clarke County	36540	
Gainesville	1	Sumter County	35464	
Gaino	1	Barbour County		
Gaird	1	Etowah County		
Gallant	1	Etowah County	35972	
Gallion	1	Hale County	36742	
Gallups Crossroads	1	Shelby County		
Gamble	1	Walker County	35501	
Gandys Cove	1	Morgan County	35622	
Ganer	1	Geneva County		
Gann Crossroad	1	DeKalb County		
Gantt	1	Covington County	36038	
Gantts Junction	1	Talladega County	35150	
Gantts Quarry	1	Talladega County	35150	
Gap of the Mountain	1	Chilton County		
Garden	1	Pickens County	35442	
Garden City	2	Blount County	35070	
Garden City	2	Cullman County	35070	
Gardendale	1	Jefferson County	35071	
Garden Highlands	1	Jefferson County	35211	
Gardiners Gin	1	Walker County	35550	
Garland	1	Butler County	36456	
Garmon Crossroads	1	Barbour County		
Garnersville	1	Crenshaw County		
Garnsey	1	Bibb County		
Garnsey Number 2	1	Bibb County		
Garrards Crossroads	1	Houston County	32440	
Garretts Crossroads	1	Houston County		
Garth	1	Jackson County	35764	
Gary Springs	1	Bibb County		
Garywood	1	Jefferson County	35023	
Gasque	1	Baldwin County	36542	
Gaston	1	Sumter County		
Gastonburg	1	Wilcox County	36728	
Gate City	1	Jefferson County		
Gateswood	1	Baldwin County	36567	
Gaylesville	1	Cherokee County	35973	
Gay Meadows	1	Montgomery County		
Gayosa	1	Walker County		
Geiger	1	Sumter County	35459	
Gelowe	1	Jefferson County		
Genery	1	Jefferson County	35023	
Geneva	1	Geneva County	36340	
Gentilly Forest	1	Jefferson County	35216	
Georgetown	1	Baldwin County		
Georgetown	1	Colbert County		
Georgetown	1	Jackson County		
Georgetown	1	Mobile County	36521	
Georgia	1	Morgan County	35640	
Georgiana	1	Butler County	36033	
Gerald	1	Dale County		
Geraldine	1	DeKalb County	35974	
German Ford	1	Washington County		
Germania	1	Jefferson County		
Gibson	1	Montgomery County		
Gibson Crossroads	1	DeKalb County		
Gibsonville	1	Clay County	36251	
Gilbert	1	St. Clair County		
Gilbert Crossroads	1	DeKalb County	35963	
Gilbertown	1	Choctaw County	36908	
Gilbertsboro	1	Limestone County	35647	
Giles	1	Bibb County	35188	
Gilliam Springs	1	Marshall County	35016	
Gilmore	1	Jefferson County	35023	
Gilmore Quarters	1	Hale County		
Gipsy	1	Limestone County	35620	
Girard	1	Russell County	36867	
Glades	1	Clay County		
Gladstone	1	Madison County	35806	
Glasgow	1	Butler County		
Glasgow	1	Jefferson County		
Glass	1	Chambers County	36854	
Glen Allen	2	Fayette County	35559	
Glen Allen	2	Marion County	35559	
Glen Carbon	1	Shelby County		
Glen City	1	St. Clair County	35125	
Glencoe	2	Calhoun County	35905	
Glencoe	2	Etowah County	35905	
Glencoe	1	Jefferson County	35223	
Glendale	1	Jefferson County	35068	
Glendean	1	Lee County	36830	
Glen Hills	1	Jefferson County	35023	
Glen Mary	1	Winston County		
Glen Oaks	1	Jefferson County	35064	
Glenview	1	Jefferson County		
Glenville	1	Russell County	36871	
Glenwood	1	Crenshaw County	36034	
Glover	1	Clarke County		
Gnatville	1	Cherokee County	36272	
Gobblers Crossing	1	Walker County		
Goddard	1	Marion County		
Godwin Estates	1	Jefferson County	35215	
Goldbranch	1	Coosa County	35183	
Golddust	1	Macon County		
Golden Springs	1	Calhoun County	36201	
Gold Hill	1	Lee County	36879	
Gold Mine	1	Marion County	35548	
Gold Ridge	1	Cullman County	35055	
Gold Ridge	1	Lee County	36879	
Gold Ridge	1	Randolph County		
Goldville	1	Tallapoosa County	36276	
Gonce	1	Jackson County	35772	
Good Hope	1	Cullman County	35055	
Good Hope	1	Elmore County	36024	
Goodman	1	Coffee County	36330	
Goodson	1	Bibb County	35034	
Good Springs	1	Franklin County		
Good Springs	1	Limestone County	35610	
Goodsprings	1	Walker County	35560	
Goodwater	1	Coosa County	35072	
Goodway	1	Monroe County	36449	
Goodwins Mill	1	St. Clair County		
Goodwyn	1	Macon County		
Goodyear	1	Etowah County		
Goose Pond Crossroads	1	Jackson County	35768	
Gordo	1	Pickens County	35466	
Gordon	1	Houston County	36343	
Gordon Heights	1	Jefferson County	35023	
Gordonville	1	Lowndes County	36040	
Goree	1	Elmore County		
Gorgas	1	Walker County	35580	
Gosa	1	Greene County		
Goshen	1	Pike County	36035	
Gosport	1	Clarke County	36482	
Gourdsville	1	Limestone County		
Graball	1	Henry County	36310	
Grace	1	Butler County		
Graces	1	Jefferson County		
Grady	1	Montgomery County	36036	
Graham	1	Randolph County	36263	
Grand Bay	1	Mobile County	36541	
Grandberry Crossroads	1	Henry County		
Grandview	1	Cullman County		
Grangeburg	1	Houston County	36343	
Granlin	1	Jefferson County		
Grant	1	Marshall County	35747	
Grantley	1	Cleburne County		
Grants Mill	1	Jefferson County		
Granttown	1	Talladega County	36268	
Grasmere	1	Talladega County		
Grasselli	1	Jefferson County	35023	
Grassland	1	Cherokee County		
Grassy	1	Lauderdale County		
Grassy	1	Marshall County	35016	
Gravel Hill	1	Franklin County	35653	
Gravelly Springs	1	Lauderdale County	35633	
Gravleeton	1	Walker County	35148	
Gray Hill	1	Bibb County		
Graymont	1	Jefferson County		
Grays Chapel	1	Jackson County	35745	
Grayson	1	Winston County	35572	
Grayson Valley	1	Jefferson County		
Graystone	1	Blount County	35013	
Graysville	1	Jefferson County	35073	
Grayton	1	Calhoun County	36271	
Greeley	1	Tuscaloosa County	35111	
Green Acres	1	Houston County		
Green Acres	1	Jefferson County		
Green Bay	1	Covington County		
Greenbrier	1	Lauderdale County	35633	
Greenbrier	1	Limestone County	35758	
Green Chapel	1	DeKalb County	35971	
Greenfield	1	Madison County		
Green Hill	1	Lauderdale County	35636	
Green Lantern	1	Montgomery County	36111	
Greenleas Heights	1	Jefferson County		
Green Pond	1	Bibb County	35074	
Greens	1	Jefferson County		
Greensboro	1	Hale County	36744	
Greens Chapel	1	Blount County	35049	
Greensport	1	St. Clair County	35953	
Green Springs	1	Jefferson County	35205	
Green Street	1	Conecuh County		
Green Tree	1	Marengo County		
Green Valley	1	Etowah County	35901	
Green Valley	1	Jefferson County	35216	
Greenview Estate	1	Jefferson County	35216	
Greenville	1	Butler County	36037	
Greenwood	1	Clarke County	36451	
Greenwood	1	Jefferson County	35023	
Greenwood	1	Macon County	36088	
Greenwycke Village	1	Madison County		
Griffco	1	Tuscaloosa County		
Griffen Mill	1	Lee County		
Griffin Addition	1	Morgan County		
Grimes	1	Dale County	36301	
Grimes	1	Tuscaloosa County		
Grove Hill	1	Clarke County	36451	
Groveoak	1	DeKalb County	35975	
Grove Park	1	Jefferson County	35229	
Grove Park	1	Talladega County	35044	
Grover	1	Cherokee County		
Guard	1	Russell County		
Guerryton	1	Bullock County	36860	
Guest	1	DeKalb County	35967	
Guin	1	Marion County	35563	
Guinea	1	Greene County		
Guinn Cross Roads	1	Franklin County		
Gulf Crest	1	Mobile County	36521	
Gulf Highlands	1	Baldwin County		
Gulf Shores	1	Baldwin County	36542	
Gum Pond	1	Morgan County	35621	
Gum Spring	1	Morgan County	35640	
Gum Springs	1	Blount County	35031	
Gunter Air Force Base	1	Montgomery County	36115	
Gunter Field	1	Montgomery County		
Guntersville	1	Marshall County	35976	
Gunterville Dam	1	Marshall County		
Gunthertown	1	Clay County		
Gurley	1	Madison County	35748	
Gurnee	1	Shelby County		
Gurnee Junction	1	Shelby County		
Guthery Crossroads	1	Cullman County	35053	
Gu-Win	2	Fayette County	35563	
Gu-Win	2	Marion County	35563	

== H ==
Name of place	Number of counties	Principal county	Lower zip code	Upper zip code
Hackleburg	1	Marion County	35564	
Hackneyville	1	Tallapoosa County	35010	
Hacoda	1	Geneva County	36442	
Haden	1	Madison County		
Hagler	1	Tuscaloosa County	35456	
Halawaka	1	Lee County		
Haleburg	1	Henry County	36319	
Hales Newala Post Office	1	Shelby County		
Haleys	1	Marion County	35565	
Haleyville	2	Marion County	35565	
Haleyville	2	Winston County	35565	
Half Acre	1	Marengo County	36763	
Half Chance	1	Marengo County		
Hall Air National Guard Station	1	Houston County	36303	
Hall Creek	1	Sumter County		
Halls Crossroads	1	Monroe County		
Halltown	1	Franklin County	35582	
Halsell	1	Choctaw County	36912	
Halso Mill	1	Butler County		
Hamburg	1	Perry County	36724	
Hamilton	1	Marion County	35570	
Hamilton Crossroads	1	Pike County	36010	
Hammac	1	Escambia County		
Hammondville	1	DeKalb County	35989	
Hamner	1	Sumter County	35460	
Hampden	1	Marengo County	36722	
Hampton	1	Tallapoosa County		
Hanceville	1	Cullman County	35077	
Hancock Crossroads	1	Jackson County	35771	
Hannah	1	Limestone County	35611	
Hannon	1	Macon County	36860	
Hanover	1	Coosa County	35136	
Happy Hill	1	Washington County		
Hardaway	1	Macon County	36039	
Hardwick	1	St. Clair County		
Hardwickburg	1	Henry County		
Hardy	1	Shelby County		
Harkins Crossroads	1	Clay County	36251	
Harkness Crossroads	1	Blount County		
Harlem Heights	1	Jefferson County	35023	
Harmon	1	Bibb County		
Harmon Crossroads	1	Randolph County		
Harmony	1	Covington County	36420	
Harmony	1	Lawrence County	35650	
Harmony	1	Marshall County	35950	
Harper Hill	1	Hale County		
Harpers Store	1	Conecuh County		
Harpersville	1	Shelby County	35078	
Harrell	1	Dallas County	36759	
Harriman Park	1	Jefferson County		
Harris	1	Limestone County		
Harrisburg	1	Bibb County	35034	
Harrisburg	1	St. Clair County	35125	
Harrisville	1	Etowah County	35952	
Hartford	1	Geneva County	36344	
Hartselle	1	Morgan County	35640	
Harvest	1	Madison County	35749	
Hatchechubbee	1	Russell County	36858	
Hatchet	1	Coosa County		
Hatters	1	Mobile County		
Hatton	1	Lawrence County	35672	
Havana	1	Hale County	35474	
Hawk	1	Randolph County	36280	
Hawkins Ford	1	Lamar County		
Hawkinsville	1	Barbour County		
Hawthorn	1	Washington County	36585	
Hayden	1	Blount County	35079	
Hayes	1	Henry County		
Hayes Highland	1	Jefferson County		
Haynes	1	Autauga County	36067	
Haynes Crossing	1	Jackson County	35772	
Haynes Crossroad	1	Clay County		
Hayneville	1	Lowndes County	36040	
Hays Ford	1	Lamar County		
Haysland	1	Madison County	35802	
Haysland Estates	1	Madison County		
Hays Mill	1	Limestone County	35620	
Haywood	1	Randolph County	36278	
Hazel Green	1	Madison County	35750	
Hazen	1	Dallas County	36767	
Headland	1	Henry County	36345	
Healing Springs	1	Washington County	36558	
Heath	1	Covington County	36420	
Hebron	1	Bibb County		
Hector	1	Bullock County	36029	
Heflin	1	Cleburne County	36264	
Heiberger	1	Perry County	36756	
Helena	2	Shelby County	35080	
Helena	2	Jefferson County	35080	
Helicon	1	Crenshaw County	36036	
Helicon	1	Winston County	35541	
Hellum Ford	1	Marshall County		
Henagar	1	DeKalb County	35978	
Henderson	1	Morgan County		
Henderson	1	Pike County	36035	
Hendrick Mill	1	Blount County		
Hendricks	1	Blount County	35121	
Hendrix	1	Blount County	35121	
Henryville	1	Marshall County	35976	
Henson Springs	1	Lamar County	35544	
Hephzibah	1	Pike County		
Hepzibah	1	Talladega County		
Herbert	1	Conecuh County	36401	
Heron Bay	1	Mobile County	36523	
Hester Heights	1	Franklin County	35653	
Hestle	1	Wilcox County		
Hickory	1	Pickens County		
Hickory Flat	1	Chambers County	36274	
Hickory Grove	1	Jefferson County		
Hickory Grove	1	Lawrence County		
Hickory Hills	1	Lauderdale County	35633	
Hickory Hills	1	Morgan County		
Hicks	1	Calhoun County		
Hicks Hill	1	Lowndes County		
Hideaway Hills	1	Lauderdale County	35645	
Higdon	1	Jackson County	35979	
High Bluff	1	Geneva County	36344	
Highfalls	1	Geneva County		
Highland	1	Chilton County		
Highland	1	Clay County	36266	
Highland Home	1	Crenshaw County	36041	
Highland Lake	1	Blount County	35121	
Highland Park	1	Montgomery County		
High Level	1	Walker County		
Highmound	1	Blount County	35980	
Highnote	1	Geneva County		
High Pine	1	Clay County		
High Point	1	DeKalb County	35989	
High Point	1	Marshall County	35950	
High Ridge	1	Bullock County	36089	
High Rock	1	Blount County		
Hightogy	1	Lamar County	35592	
Hightower	1	Cleburne County	36263	
Hillandale	1	Madison County		
Hillard	1	Walker County	35587	
Hillcrest	1	Perry County		
Hilliard	1	Walker County	35579	
Hillman	1	Jefferson County	35023	
Hillman Gardens	1	Jefferson County	35023	
Hillman Park	1	Jefferson County	35023	
Hill Number 1	1	St. Clair County		
Hillsboro	1	Lawrence County	35643	
Hillsboro	1	Madison County	35761	
Hillsdale	1	Shelby County		
Hillsdale	1	Walker County		
Hilltop	1	Jefferson County	35023	
Hill Top	1	Marengo County		
Hillview	1	Jefferson County	35214	
Hillwood	1	Coosa County		
Hines	1	Lauderdale County		
Hinton	1	Choctaw County	39355	
Hirsch	1	Russell County	36871	
Hissop	1	Coosa County	35136	
Hixon	1	Monroe County		
Hixon	1	Sumter County		
Hobbie Farm	1	Montgomery County		
Hobbs Island	1	Madison County	35803	
Hobdy	1	Barbour County		
Hobgood	1	Colbert County	35674	
Hoboken	1	Barbour County	36027	
Hoboken	1	Marengo County	36782	
Hobson	1	Jefferson County		
Hobson City	1	Calhoun County	36201	
Hodge	1	Jackson County	35744	
Hodges	1	Franklin County	35571	
Hodges Lake	1	Tuscaloosa County		
Hodges Store	1	Lawrence County		
Hodges Store	1	Morgan County	35619	
Hodgesville	1	Houston County	36301	
Hodgewood	1	Choctaw County	36921	
Hogglesville	1	Hale County	35474	
Hog Jaw	1	Marshall County	35016	
Hokes Bluff	1	Etowah County	35903	
Holiday Gardens	1	Jefferson County		
Holiday Homes	1	Madison County		
Holiday Park Estates	1	Jefferson County	35215	
Holland Gin	1	Limestone County	35620	
Holley Crossroads	1	Calhoun County	36265	
Hollingers Island	1	Mobile County		
Hollins	1	Clay County	35082	
Hollis Crossroads	1	Cleburne County	36264	
Holloway	1	Lauderdale County		
Holly Grove	1	Walker County		
Holly Pond	1	Cullman County	35083	
Holly Springs	1	Blount County	35146	
Hollytree	1	Jackson County	35751	
Hollywood	1	Jackson County	35752	
Hollywood	1	Jefferson County	35229	
Holman	1	Escambia County	36503	
Holman	1	Tuscaloosa County		
Holman Crossroads	1	Coosa County		
Holt	1	Tuscaloosa County	35404	
Holt Junction	1	Tuscaloosa County		
Holtville	1	Elmore County	36022	
Holy Trinity	1	Russell County	36859	
Homewood	1	Jefferson County	35209	
Homewood	1	Monroe County		
Honoraville	1	Crenshaw County	36042	
Hoods Crossroads	1	Blount County	35121	
Hooks	1	Russell County		
Hooks Crossroads	1	Bullock County		
Hooper City	1	Jefferson County		
Hoover	2	Jefferson County	35236	
Hoover	2	Shelby County	35236	
Hoover	1	Madison County		
Hopeful	1	Talladega County		
Hope Hull	1	Montgomery County	36043	
Hopewell	1	Blount County		
Hopewell	1	Cherokee County	35959	
Hopewell	1	Cleburne County	36264	
Hopewell	1	DeKalb County	35950	
Hopewell	1	Jefferson County	35023	
Hopewell	1	Lee County		
Hopper	1	Etowah County		
Hornady	1	Macon County		
Horn Hill	1	Covington County	36467	
Horning	1	Washington County		
Horseshoe Bend National Military Park	1	Tallapoosa County	36256	
Horton	1	DeKalb County		
Horton	1	Marshall County	35980	
Hortons Mill	1	Blount County	35121	
Hospital	1	Tuscaloosa County		
Hotamville	1	Marengo County		
Houston	1	Winston County	35572	
Houstontown	1	Lauderdale County		
Houstonville	1	Baldwin County		
Howard	1	Fayette County	35549	
Howard College	1	Jefferson County		
Howe	1	Barbour County		
Howells	1	Covington County		
Howells Crossroads	1	Cherokee County	35960	
Howelton	1	Etowah County	35952	
Howton	1	Tuscaloosa County	35453	
Hubbard	1	Chilton County		
Hubbertville	1	Fayette County	35555	
Huckaville	1	Covington County		
Hudson Gardens	1	Jefferson County	35023	
Hudson Grove	1	Jefferson County		
Hudson Settlement	1	Walker County		
Hueytown	1	Jefferson County	35023	
Hueytown Crest	1	Jefferson County	35023	
Huff	1	Jefferson County		
Huffman	1	Jefferson County	35235	
Huffman Gardens	1	Jefferson County		
Hughes Mill	1	DeKalb County		
Hugley	1	Russell County		
Hugo	1	Marengo County	36783	
Huguley	1	Chambers County	36863	
Hulaco	1	Morgan County	35087	
Hull	1	Tuscaloosa County		
Hull	1	Walker County	35063	
Humoro	1	Jefferson County		
Humpton	1	Marshall County	35776	
Hunter	1	Montgomery County	36108	
Huntsville	2	Limestone County	35801	
Huntsville	2	Madison County	35801	
Huntsville Arsenal	1	Madison County		
Huntsville Park	1	Madison County		
Hurley	1	Cherokee County		
Hurricane	1	Baldwin County	36507	
Hurtsboro	1	Russell County	36860	
Hustleville	1	Marshall County	35950	
Hustontown	1	Lauderdale County	35645	
Huxford	1	Escambia County	36543	
Hyatt	1	Marshall County	35980	
Hybart	1	Monroe County	36481	
Hycutt	1	Greene County		
Hyde Park	1	Jefferson County		
Hytop	1	Jackson County	35768	
