= Fish pond (disambiguation) =

A Fish pond or fishpond is a pond, artificial lake, or reservoir that is stocked with fish.

Fish pond, Fishpond and Fishponds may also refer to:

== Places ==
- Fishpond, Alabama, an unincorporated community in Coosa County
- Fishponds, a suburb of Bristol, England
- Fish Ponds, a location on the Mojave River in California

== Other ==
- Fishpond, code name for a development of Fishpond, a World War II British radar system
- Fishpond.co.nz, a New Zealand e-commerce company
- "The Fishing Pond", an episode of the 2019 Indian animated series Chacha Chaudhary
