= WFXO (disambiguation) =

WFXO may refer to:

- WFXO (AM), a radio station (1050 AM) licensed to serve Alexander City, Alabama, United States
- WSGN (FM), a radio station (98.3 FM) licensed to serve Stewartville, Alabama, which held the call sign WFXO from 2012 to 2022
- WKLS, a radio station (105.9 FM) licensed to serve Southside, Alabama, which held the call sign WFXO from 2008 to 2012
- WKZU, a radio station (104.9 FM) licensed to serve Iuka, Mississippi, United States, which held the call sign WFXO from 1990 to 2008
