= Alabama State Route 196 =

State highway in Alabama, United States

State Route 196
- West Magnolia Avenue

Route information
- Maintained by ALDOT
- Length: 1.690 mi (2.720 km)

Major junctions
- West end: SR 52 in Geneva
- East end: SR 27 in Geneva

Location
- Country: United States
- State: Alabama
- Counties: Geneva

Highway system
- Alabama State Highway System; Interstate; US; State
← SR 195	→ SR 197

State Route 196 (SR 196) is a 1.690-mile-long (2.720 km) route that serves as a connection between SR 52 and SR 27 through Geneva.

== Route description ==
The western terminus of SR 196 is located at its intersection with SR 52 in western Geneva. From this point, the route travels in a southeasterly direction en route to its eastern terminus at SR 27. The route is also signed as West Magnolia Avenue for its duration.

== Major intersections ==
The entire route is in Geneva, Geneva County.

mi	km	Destinations	Notes
0.000	0.000	SR 52 (W Magnolia Avenue/W Maple Avenue) – Eunola, Hartford, Samson	Western terminus
1.690	2.720	SR 27 (Sizemore Highway/E Magnolia Avenue) – Enterprise, Florida	Eastern terminus
1.000 mi = 1.609 km; 1.000 km = 0.621 mi
