= WRFS =

WRFS may refer to:

- WRFS (FM), a radio station (105.1 FM) licensed to serve Rockford, Alabama, United States
- WFXO (AM), a radio station (1050 AM) licensed to serve Alexander City, Alabama, which held the call sign WRFS from April 1994 to May 2008
- Web Relational File System, a stack of abstraction layers proposed for data portability purposes
