= WSGN =

WSGN may refer to:

- WSGN (FM), a radio station (98.3 FM) licensed to serve Stewartville, Alabama, United States
- WFXO (AM), a radio station (1050 AM) licensed to serve Alexander City, Alabama, which held the call sign WSGN from 2019 to 2022
- WLGQ, a radio station (91.5 FM) licensed to serve Gadsden, Alabama, which held the call sign WSGN from 1985 to 2019
- WAGG, a radio station (610 AM) licensed to serve Birmingham, Alabama, which held the call sign WSGN from 1934 to 1985
