= High Note =

High Note may refer to:

- High Note (film), a 1960 cartoon short
- The High Note, a 2020 film
- Highnote, Alabama, an unincorporated community in the United States
- HighNote Records, a jazz-focused record label
- "High Note", a 2020 song by Brothers Osborne from Skeletons (Brothers Osborne album)
- "High Note", a 2023 song by Dierks Bentley featuring Billy Strings from Gravel & Gold
