= Fadette, Alabama =

Unincorporated community in Alabama, United States

- Unincorporated community
- Location within Alabama Location within the United States
- Coordinates: 31°02′41″N 85°32′15″W
- Country: United States
- State: Alabama
- County: Geneva
- Elevation: 253 ft (77 m)
- Time zone: UTC-6 (Central (CST))
  - Summer (DST): UTC-5 (CDT)
- Area code: 334
- GNIS feature ID: 118102

Fadette is an unincorporated community in Geneva County, Alabama, United States. Fadette is located on Alabama State Route 103, 5.4 miles (8.7 km) southeast of Slocomb.

== History ==
The community was named by H. A. Smith, who operated the first post office. The meaning of the community's name is uncertain. A post office operated under the name Fadette from 1891 to 1906.
