= Hacoda, Alabama =

Unincorporated community in Alabama, United States

- Unincorporated community
- Location within Alabama Location within the United States
- Coordinates: 31°04′30″N 86°09′59″W
- Country: United States
- State: Alabama
- County: Geneva
- Elevation: 154 ft (47 m)
- Time zone: UTC-6 (Central (CST))
  - Summer (DST): UTC-5 (CDT)
- Area code: 334
- GNIS feature ID: 119536

Hacoda, also known as Martha, is an unincorporated community in Geneva County, Alabama, United States. Hacoda is located on Alabama State Route 54, 7.5 miles (12.1 km) west-southwest of Samson.

== History ==
The community was first called Martha, in honor of the wife of the first postmaster. The name was later changed to Hacoda in 1904. Hacoda is a portmanteau created from the surnames of three local businessmen—Hart, Coleman, and Davis. A post office operated under the name Martha from 1882 to 1904, and under the name Hacoda from 1904 to 1956.
