= Geneva County massacre =

2009 spree shooting in Alabama, U.S.

- Location of Geneva County where nine victims of the shooting spree were murdered within the state of Alabama
- Location: 31.2584°N 86.1365°W; Geneva County, Alabama, U.S.
- Date: March 10, 2009 c. 2:00 – 4:17 p.m. (CST)
- Attack type: Mass murder; murder-suicide; spree shooting; arson; matricide; mass shooting
- Weapons: 5.56 NATO Bushmaster XM-15 semi-automatic rifle; 7.62 x 39mm Soviet SKS carbine semi-automatic rifle; .38-caliber revolver; 12-gauge shotgun; .410 shotguns; incendiary device
- Deaths: 11 (including the perpetrator and his mother at home)
- Injuries: 6
- Perpetrator: Michael Kenneth McLendon
- Defender: Joel Hendron
- Motive: Inconclusive

The Geneva County massacre, also known as the Samson massacre, was a mass shooting that occurred on March 10, 2009, across several locations in and around Geneva County, Alabama, United States. Ten people were murdered in the attacks; six more were injured, including a state trooper and a municipal officer, in both domestic and indiscriminate attacks. A formal motive for the attacks is officially undetermined.

On March 10, 2009, 28-year-old Michael Kenneth McLendon opened fire on four separate occasions across various locations in the Wiregrass region. That afternoon, he committed multiple shootings and set fire at one location between the communities of Kinston, Samson, and Geneva, Alabama. McLendon first killed his mother, then set fire to their house. Traveling to Samson, he fatally shot his maternal grandmother, an uncle, two cousins, and a neighbor and her infant daughter. When law enforcement reached him, McLendon committed suicide. He was reportedly depressed about a lack of work; in a note, he said that his mother's family was not providing him or his mother with adequate support. McLendon's shooting spree remains the deadliest mass shooting in Alabama's history, as well as the worst mass murder in Alabama, surpassing the 2002 Ball family murders.

== Events ==
=== Murder of Lisa McLendon ===
McLendon began his attacks around 2:00 p.m. (CST) on March 10, 2009, at his mother's private residence where they lived in the town of Kinston, a small town in Coffee County, Alabama. McLendon first shot and killed his mother and their dogs, stating in a note that he had to put down the dogs because there would be no one left to care for them, before setting the interior of the house on fire, using paint thinner that he stuck a bayonet into, thus burning the living room. Investigators later revealed that Lisa McLendon was asleep facedown on the couch when she was shot in the head by her son. Neighbor Esker Chambless, who had stopped by to till the garden of the Kinston residence, stated that McLendon had dug a plot to bury one of his dogs; he had killed all of his dogs prior to Chambless’ arrival on that Tuesday. The bodies of the dogs and McLendon’s mother were discovered amid the ruins at around 3:30 p.m. McLendon wrote a note apologizing for the murder of his mother and stating those responsible for him and his mother's extensive suffering would face violent retribution for their actions.

=== Subsequent shootings ===
McLendon left his house with two semi-automatic rifles and more than 800 rounds of ammunition before driving to his uncle's house in the small town of Samson. There, he opened fire on a porch, instantly killing his uncle, two cousins, a neighbor, and the neighbor's 18-month-old daughter, all of whom were sitting on the porch; the neighbor's four-month-old daughter was also shot but survived. McLendon then shot at his aunt six times with a revolver, but she ran away and escaped the shooting unscathed. McLendon then proceeded to his maternal grandmother's adjacent residence and fatally shot her in her doorway.

McLendon left his grandmother's home and started driving and shooting at people from his car. The first to die was 43-year-old Sonya Smith, a gas station attendant, who was killed by McLendon at the Inland gas station on 1 West Main Street in Samson. McLendon next shot and killed Bruce Malloy, a 51-year-old motorist who drove past him. The last fatality was 24-year-old James Starling, whom McLendon shot in the back as he attempted to flee. McLendon also shot and wounded four other people trying to escape his attack. He drove along Highway 52 toward Geneva, continuing to shoot from his car, and eventually led police on a chase that ran 24 miles (39 km). Police received and later released several 9-1-1 calls in which witnesses described McLendon as a "smiling, unshaven man" shooting at cars on Highway 52.

Law enforcement officers at one point attempted to PIT maneuver the suspect's car, but he fired 15-18 rounds at them, all at once, with his Bushmaster AR-15 style rifle. Geneva police chief Frankie Lindsey was hit in the arm with shrapnel. McLendon reached Reliable Products, owned by Ruskin Company, where he had worked in 2003. After engaging in a shootout with police, McLendon was then confronted by and traded fire with Joel Hendron, an off-duty 14-year veteran with the Alabama Department of Conservation and Natural Resources, who had an AR-15 style rifle. After exchanging gunfire, Hendron shot and wounded him in the left torso by shrapnel before he committed suicide inside the building, ending his shooting spree. When law enforcement found McLendon dead from a gunshot, it was initially unclear whether the shot was self-inflicted. Later reports said he committed suicide.

The shootings lasted for around fifty minutes before McLendon was found dead at 4:17 p.m. McLendon was found to have been armed with a 12 gauge shotgun, a Soviet-made SKS carbine, and a Bushmaster AR-15 style rifle, as well as having over 800 rounds of ammunition. McLendon wielded his rifles with taped-together "jungle style" 30-round magazines, which was reportedly to facilitate more rapid firing in bursts. Police also found at least one .38 caliber revolver. The director of the Alabama Department of Public Safety later announced that McLendon had fired 125 spent shell casings from his two semi-automatic rifles during the shootings.

== Victims ==
McLendon's mother and maternal relatives were among the victims: grandmother, uncle, and two cousins. Neighbor Andrea Myers and her 18-month-old daughter Corinne were also killed, while Myers' four-month-old daughter Ella survived. Myers' four-year-old son was in the house and survived unharmed. His uncle and aunt had largely raised McLendon. His victims ranged in age from 18 months to 74 years old.

In addition, McLendon shot from his car after he fled, killing strangers. According to a local police officer:

Four were killed while sitting on a porch in Samson, one next door while inside a trailer. Two more were killed outside the Big and Little Store in Samson. The suspect was killed in the Reliable Products warehouse in Geneva by a self-inflicted gunshot wound to the head. He shot at several vehicles on the highway and then he shot at Wal-Mart and Piggly Wiggly in Geneva.

The victims were:

- Lisa White McLendon, 52, Michael McLendon's mother, killed at her home in Kinston
- James Alfred White, 55, McLendon's uncle, killed at the White home in Samson
- Tracy Michelle Wise, 34, daughter of James White, McLendon's cousin, killed at the White home
- Dean James Wise, 15, son of Tracy Wise, McLendon's cousin, killed at the White home
- Andrea Dawn Myers, 31, neighbor of the Whites, killed at the White home
- Corrine Gracy Myers, 18 months, daughter of Andrea Myers, killed at the White home
- Virginia Ett White, 74, McLendon's grandmother, killed at her home in Samson
- Sonya Marie Smith, 43, killed at a gas station in Samson
- Bruce Wilson Maloy, 51, killed in Samson
- James Irvin Starling, 24, killed in Samson

== Perpetrator ==
Michael Kenneth McLendon (September 19, 1980 – March 10, 2009) was born in southern Alabama to Lisa McLendon (née White) and her husband. After his parents divorced, he was largely raised by his aunt and maternal uncle, Phyllis and James White, of Samson, Alabama. He had attended local schools and graduated in 1999. McLendon was known for being quiet.

Unmarried, McLendon lived with his mother at her home in Kinston; the town and surrounding areas had a depressed economy following the relocation of textile jobs overseas several years before. McLendon's work history showed a pattern of short tenure at jobs. He worked briefly with the police department in Samson but failed to complete basic training at the state academy, leaving after a "week and a half." He worked at the Reliable Products warehouse in Geneva, where he was asked to leave in 2003. He and his mother also worked at Pilgrim Foods, a poultry plant, and had filed a lawsuit alongside other workers when they were suspended in 2006.

Prior to the shootings, McLendon worked at Kelley Foods, a sausage factory in Elba. He abruptly quit the job the Wednesday before the shooting spree. Supervisors there said that he was a team leader and well-liked.

=== Autopsy ===
Investigators with the State Bureau of Investigation conducted ballistic analysis on the firearms recovered from McLendon, including a Bushmaster XM-15 A3 semi-automatic rifle, a Soviet-made SKS semi-automatic carbine and a .38 caliber revolver, which subsequently linked them definitively to the casings recovered from the Coffee County residence, the Samson scenes, and the Geneva Reliable Products warehouse.

It was concluded by an autopsy that McLendon died from a self-inflicted gunshot wound. The Alabama Bureau Of Investigation (ABI) released that they have determined that all weapons were legally acquired, with no prohibited features McLendon was not permitted to own. Some of the firearms were inherited by family, while others were purchased from standard channels such as legally permitted dealers and firearm stores, with none being of exotism, or being directly traceable to illicit sources.

=== Motive and employment ===
Witnesses said that McLendon was disturbed by his parents' divorce years ago and had been depressed about his failure to start a career and disappointed that he had failed to qualify for the U.S. Marines or law enforcement. He had recently complained that his mother was not getting enough support from her family. At the time of the shooting, officials did not know where his father was. Detectives discovered a handwritten list by McLendon in his home which identified several people from previous jobs, with notations about their actions or comments against him, described as people who "had either disciplined him or had reported him to supervisors for work related infractions". The Alabama Bureau of Investigation noted that none of the people named in the list were among those he killed, but police were trying to determine if he had intended to attack them.

Investigators found a letter in which McLendon said he had killed his mother and planned to commit suicide. The letter also noted he was having a dispute over a legal issue with his mother's family, as they held a family Bible that he wanted. He said that he and his mother had "suffered enough".

McLendon was described as very familiar with firearms, as well as survivalism. The investigators "found dozens of ammunition boxes, military and survivalist gear and medical supplies at McLendon's Kinston home".

McLendon's coworkers reportedly incessantly mocked him and called him "Doughboy" due to his weight, a nickname he disliked, a detail underscoring accumulated self-perceived personal failures.

== Aftermath ==
In response to a request for assistance from the Geneva County Sheriff's Office and the Samson Police Department, United States Army officers ordered federal troops from nearby Fort Rucker to be deployed to the streets of Samson. They guarded both traffic stops and a makeshift morgue. An Army investigation later determined this action to be in violation of the Posse Comitatus Act, which prohibits federal troops from performing domestic law enforcement actions. The Army took administrative action against at least one officer.

== Reactions ==
The Andalusia radio station WAAO-FM organized a fund-raising event to benefit the victims' families. Their goal was $10,000 with the event; more than $47,000 in cash, plus donations of caskets and concrete vaults for each of the victims, brought the total value of donations to more than $100,000.

== See also ==
- List of rampage killers in the United States
- Gun violence in the United States
- Gun law in the United States
- Gun politics in the United States
- Mass shootings in the United States
- list of shootings in Alabama
