= Chancellor, Alabama =

Unincorporated community in Alabama, United States

- Unincorporated community
- Motto: We Are Chancellor
- Location within Alabama Location within the United States
- Coordinates: 31°10′54″N 85°52′38″W
- Country: United States
- State: Alabama
- County: Geneva
- Elevation: 276 ft (84 m)
- Time zone: UTC-6 (Central (CST))
  - Summer (DST): UTC-5 (CDT)
- ZIP code: 36316
- GNIS feature ID: 115933

Chancellor is an unincorporated community in Geneva County, Alabama, United States. Chancellor has a post office with ZIP code 36316.
