= Alabama State Route 54 =

State highway in Alabama, United States

State Route 54

Route information
- Maintained by ALDOT
- Length: 15.995 mi (25.741 km)
- Existed: 1940–present

Major junctions
- West end: US 331 at Florala
- East end: SR 52 at Earlytown

Location
- Country: United States
- State: Alabama
- Counties: Covington, Geneva

Highway system
- Alabama State Highway System; Interstate; US; State
← SR 53	→ SR 55

State Route 54 (SR 54) is a 15.995-mile-long (25.741 km) state highway in the extreme southern part of the U.S. state of Alabama. The western terminus of the highway is at an intersection with U.S. Route 331 (US 331) at Florala just north of the Florida state line. The eastern terminus of the highway is at an intersection with SR 52 just west of Samson.

== Route description ==
SR 54 is routed along a two-lane road as it traverses Covington and Geneva counties. From Florala, the highway travels in a generally east–west orientation. The highway assumes a northeasterly trajectory as it approaches the Covington–Geneva county line, and continues this orientation until it reaches its eastern terminus in western Geneva County. The surrounding area mostly consists of farmland and light forest growth.

== Major intersections ==
County	Location	mi	km	Destinations	Notes
Covington	Florala	0.000	0.000	US 331 (SR 9) – DeFuniak Springs, Opp, Andalusia	Western terminus
Covington	Florala	1.118	1.799	Lakewood, Florida	to CR 285
Geneva		15.995	25.741	SR 52 – Opp, Samson, Geneva	Eastern terminus
1.000 mi = 1.609 km; 1.000 km = 0.621 mi
