= WYEA =

- Sylacauga, Alabama; United States
- Broadcast area: Birmingham, Alabama
- Frequency: 1290 kHz
- Branding: Kix 96.3 100.3

Programming
- Format: Country

Ownership
- Owner: Marble City Media LLC; (Marble City Media LLC)
- Sister stations: WFXO, WRFS, WSGN, WAUE

History
- First air date: May 16, 1948
- Former call signs: WMLS (1948–1981)

Technical information
- Licensing authority: FCC
- Facility ID: 70638
- Class: D
- Power: 1,000 watts (day); 50 watts (night)
- Transmitter coordinates: 33°11′44″N 86°14′02″W
- Translator: 100.3 W262DI (Sylacauga)

Links
- Public license information: Public file; LMS
- Website: kix1003.com

WYEA (1290 AM) is a radio station broadcasting a country music format. Licensed to Sylacauga, Alabama, United States, and two of only three commercial radio stations in Talladega County, they are owned and operated by Marble City Media LLC.

== Station history ==
At 7:00 a.m. on May 16, 1948, what is now WYEA-AM was born as WMLS-AM.

A license was granted by the Federal Communications Commission on Dec. 23, 1947, and construction began on January 5, 1948. The original Raytheon RA-1000 transmitter, serial number 213, in constant use until being replaced on January 28, 2012, is showcased in the Alabama Historical Radio Society museum in Birmingham.

Studios and offices were originally located above the T&J Café at 11½ W. Second St. in downtown Sylacauga, although the tower and transmitter were north of the city in an area with no address later known as 1 Motes Rd.

Gertrude Tyson, host of the station's popular Friendly Neighbor program, later explained: "WMLS had its beginning as a dream in the minds of four young Sylacauga veterans. They had all been in the service during World War II, and were attending Birmingham Southern after the war. As was the case with all returned veterans, they were eager to get into something that would be profitable to them and serve their hometown as well. When they learned that a frequency was available for the 1,000 watt station, they got up a few thousand dollars between them and the dream soon became a reality."

The original investors, who launched the station as the Marble City Broadcasting Co. Inc., were Curtis O. Liles Jr., Henry Judson Darden Jr., Edward J. Smith, and James S. Stowers Jr., with Paul H. Sarvis and Robert H. Arnold also stockholders. Liles, initially vice president and general manager, became majority owner and President in buying out later investor Richard L. Scroggins in September 1953. By 1956, the entire operation had consolidated in a new building on Motes Rd., and a companion WMLS-FM signed on the air in December 1959. Thereafter, Liles became sole owner.

On September 1, 1980, the stations were purchased by Summit Broadcasting Inc. New owner Joseph V. Windsor, who had been a senior television group executive in Columbus, Ga., moved the WYEA call letters from a television station there to Sylacauga on November 30, 1981.

On April 14, 1986, the FCC approved the transfer of WYEA-AM and WMLS-FM to Action Communications Enterprises Inc., a North Carolina–based radio group headed by David C. Phillips. That September, WMLS-FM changed its call letters to WAWV-FM, and, after 37 years in Sylacauga, the familiar WMLS call sign was adopted by a public FM station in Minnesota.

On June 30, 1993, the FCC approved the transfer of WYEA-AM and WAWV-FM to W.O. Powers of South Carolina.

On December 23, 1997, Spirit Broadcasting Co. Inc., owned by John H. Vogel, Robert D. Pierce, and Gary Mitchell, purchased WYEA-AM. Vogel, who joined the station under earlier ownership in 1983, became sole owner of the company on May 8, 2001.

Powers sold WAWV-FM to Alabama Broadcasting Co. Inc., owner of WFEB-AM, then regained ownership on November 30, 1998. WAWV-FM was sold to Coosa Valley Broadcasting Inc. on July 1, 1999, and to Williams Communications Inc. on August 20, 2001. It became WTRB-FM in 2001, and, known as WTXO-FM since 2008, it moved some 30 miles away to Ashland, Ala.

On January 1, 2012, Marble City Media LLC, under a local marketing agreement with Spirit Broadcasting Co. Inc., began programming and operating the station. On June 4, 2012, the Federal Communications Commission approved transfer of the station's licenses to Marble City Media LLC, and the transaction was completed on June 5, 2012.

On November 25, 2013, the FCC granted a construction permit for a new FM translator on 106.3 MHz in Sylacauga. From a tall tower in the southwestern part of the city, near the Talladega-Coosa County line, the FM addition began simulcasting WYEA-AM's programming just before noon on January 19, 2014.

On March 11, 2014, the FCC granted an application for the translator to move from 106.3 MHz to 106.5 MHz, followed by authorization of a power increase on May 7, 2014. On June 1, 2014, the frequency changed to 106.5 MHz.

Marble City Media LLC also owns and operates stations primarily serving Sylacauga-Childersburg-Talladega and Alexander City-Dadeville-Lake Martin-Wetumpka-Montgomery and has a construction permit to build a new FM station in Waverly, Alabama, to serve the Auburn-Opelika area.

On May 25, 2018, WYEA changed their format from classic hits (which moved to WFXO's HD2 subchannel) to country, branded as "Kix 100.3".
