= Marble Valley, Alabama =

Unincorporated community in Alabama, United States

- Unincorporated community
- Location within Alabama Location within the United States
- Coordinates: 33°02′38″N 86°27′07″W
- Country: United States
- State: Alabama
- County: Coosa
- Elevation: 518 ft (158 m)
- Time zone: UTC-6 (Central (CST))
  - Summer (DST): UTC-5 (CDT)
- Area codes: 256 & 938, 334
- GNIS feature ID: 156656

Marble Valley is an unincorporated community in Coosa County, Alabama, United States.

== History ==
Marble Valley is named for the Sylacauga marble found and quarried locally. post office named Marble Valley operated from 1852 until it closed in 1934. Marble Valley served as a recruitment site for soldiers volunteering to join the Confederate States Army from Coosa County. One soldier from Marble Valley, William Wood, wrote letters home to his family during the Civil War. After his death in a Union prison in 1863, his brothers compiled the letters and testimonies from fellow soldiers into a memoir.
