= Alabama State Route 103 =

State highway in Alabama, United States

State Route 103

Route information
- Maintained by ALDOT
- Length: 17.463 mi (28.104 km)
- Existed: 1940–present

Major junctions
- South end: CR 171 at the Florida state line north of Graceville, FL
- SR 52 in Slocomb
- North end: SR 123 in Wicksburg

Location
- Country: United States
- State: Alabama
- Counties: Geneva, Dale

Highway system
- Alabama State Highway System; Interstate; US; State
← SR 102	→ SR 104

State Route 103 (SR 103) is a 17.463-mile-long (28.104 km) state highway in the southeastern part of the U.S. state of Alabama. The highway begins at the Florida state line and is a continuation of County Road 171 (formerly a state road). The northern terminus of the highway is at an intersection with SR 123 in Wicksburg, an unincorporated community north of the Geneva–Houston County line.

== Route description ==
SR 103 travels primarily through eastern Geneva County. It is one of numerous highways that enter Alabama from the Florida Panhandle. Upon entering Alabama, the highway heads northward, traveling primarily through rural areas of the county along a two-lane roadway. At the approximate halfway point of the highway, it travels through Slocomb, the only incorporated community along its length.

== Major intersections ==
County	Location	mi	km	Destinations	Notes
Geneva		0.000	0.000	CR 171 south – Graceville	Florida state line; southern terminus
Geneva	Slocomb	8.933	14.376	SR 52 east – Dothan	Southern end of SR 52 concurrency
Geneva	Slocomb	9.011	14.502	SR 52 west – Hartford, Geneva	Northern end of SR 52 concurrency
Houston	Wicksburg	17.463	28.104	SR 123	Northern terminus
1.000 mi = 1.609 km; 1.000 km = 0.621 mi: Concurrency terminus
