= Wicksburg, Alabama =

Unincorporated community in Alabama, United States

- Unincorporated community
- Location within Alabama Location within the United States
- Coordinates: 31°12′30″N 85°37′21″W
- Country: United States
- State: Alabama
- County: Houston
- Elevation: 305 ft (93 m)
- Time zone: UTC-6 (Central (CST))
  - Summer (DST): UTC-5 (CDT)
- Area code: 334
- GNIS feature ID: 153984

Wicksburg, also spelled Wicksburgh, is an unincorporated community in Houston County, Alabama, United States. Wicksburg is located along Alabama State Route 103, 13.5 miles (21.7 km) west of Dothan.

== History ==
Wicksburg is named in honor of Elijah Trawick, who was the first postmaster. A post office operated under the name Wicksburg from 1878 to 1908.

The Wicksburg soil series is named for the community.

== Notable people ==
- Nathan Mathis, politician
