= Ray, Alabama =

- Census-designated place
- Location of Ray in Coosa County, Alabama.
- Coordinates: 32°52′23″N 86°02′25″W
- Country: United States
- State: Alabama
- County: Coosa

Area
  - Total: 9.51 sq mi (24.64 km^{2})
  - Land: 9.46 sq mi (24.51 km^{2})
  - Water: 0.050 sq mi (0.13 km^{2})
- Elevation: 709 ft (216 m)

Population (2020)
  - Total: 326
  - Density: 34/sq mi (13.3/km^{2})
- Time zone: UTC-6 (Central (CST))
  - Summer (DST): UTC-5 (CDT)
- Area codes: 256 & 938
- GNIS feature ID: 2582695

Ray is a census-designated place and unincorporated community in Coosa County, Alabama, United States. Its population was 326 as of the 2020 census.

== Demographics ==
Historical population
| Census | Pop. | Note | %± |
|---|---|---|---|
| 2010 | 443 | | — |
| 2020 | 326 | | −26.4% |
U.S. Decennial Census

Ray was listed as a census designated place in the 2010 U.S. census.

Ray CDP, Alabama – Racial and ethnic composition Note: the US Census treats Hispanic/Latino as an ethnic category. This table excludes Latinos from the racial categories and assigns them to a separate category. Hispanics/Latinos may be of any race.
| Race / Ethnicity (NH = Non-Hispanic) | Pop 2010 | Pop 2020 | % 2010 | % 2020 |
|---|---|---|---|---|
| White alone (NH) | 290 | 257 | 65.46% | 78.83% |
| Black or African American alone (NH) | 72 | 44 | 16.25% | 13.50% |
| Native American or Alaska Native alone (NH) | 1 | 3 | 0.23% | 0.92% |
| Asian alone (NH) | 3 | 1 | 0.68% | 0.31% |
| Native Hawaiian or Pacific Islander alone (NH) | 0 | 0 | 0.00% | 0.00% |
| Other race alone (NH) | 0 | 3 | 0.00% | 0.92% |
| Mixed race or Multiracial (NH) | 0 | 5 | 0.00% | 1.53% |
| Hispanic or Latino (any race) | 77 | 13 | 17.38% | 3.99% |
| Total | 443 | 326 | 100.00% | 100.00% |
