= WAUE =

Radio station in Waverly, Alabama

- Waverly, Alabama; United States
- Broadcast area: Auburn-Opelika, Alabama
- Frequency: 100.3 MHz
- Branding: AU100

Programming
- Format: Adult contemporary

Ownership
- Owner: Marble City Media LLC
- Sister stations: WFXO, WRFS, WSGN, WYEA

History
- First air date: 2018
- Former call signs: WAUA (2015–2019)

Technical information
- Licensing authority: FCC
- Facility ID: 198812
- Class: A
- ERP: 320 watts
- HAAT: 129 meters (423 ft)
- Transmitter coordinates: 32°43′34″N 85°34′36″W
- Translator: 104.5 W283DQ (Auburn)

Links
- Public license information: Public file; LMS
- Website: www.radioalabama.net/au1003

WAUE (100.3 FM, "AU100") is a radio station licensed to serve the community of Waverly, Alabama. The station is owned by Marble City Media, LLC and airs an adult contemporary music format.

The station was assigned the call sign WAUA by the Federal Communications Commission on November 2, 2015. The station changed its call sign to WAUE on March 24, 2019.

On November 13, 2019, WAUE changed their format from country to adult contemporary, branded as "AU100".

As part of an agreement between the university and station owner RadioAlabama, the station added Auburn Tigers baseball and women's basketball broadcasts in July 2023.
