= Mount Olive, Coosa County, Alabama =

Mount Olive, Alabama
- Census-designated place
- Location within Alabama
- Coordinates: 33°04′40″N 86°07′32″W
- Country: United States
- State: Alabama
- County: Coosa

Area
  - Total: 8.32 sq mi (21.55 km^{2})
  - Land: 8.32 sq mi (21.55 km^{2})
  - Water: 0.0039 sq mi (0.01 km^{2})
- Elevation: 840 ft (260 m)

Population (2020)
  - Total: 311
  - Density: 37.4/sq mi (14.43/km^{2})
- Time zone: UTC-6 (Central (CST))
  - Summer (DST): UTC-5 (CDT)
- Area codes: 256 & 938
- FIPS code: 01-52320
- GNIS feature ID: 2582689

Mount Olive is a census-designated place in Coosa County, Alabama, United States. Its population was 311 as of the 2020 census.

== Demographics ==
Historical population
Census	Pop.	Note	%±
2010	371		—
2020	311		−16.2%
U.S. Decennial Census

Mount Olive was listed as a census designated place in the 2010 U.S. census.

Mount Olive CDP, Coosa County, Alabama – Racial and ethnic composition Note: the US Census treats Hispanic/Latino as an ethnic category. This table excludes Latinos from the racial categories and assigns them to a separate category. Hispanics/Latinos may be of any race.
Race / Ethnicity (NH = Non-Hispanic)	Pop 2010	Pop 2020	% 2010	% 2020
White alone (NH)	276	211	74.39%	67.85%
Black or African American alone (NH)	86	76	23.18%	24.44%
Native American or Alaska Native alone (NH)	2	3	0.54%	0.96%
Asian alone (NH)	0	0	0.00%	0.00%
Native Hawaiian or Pacific Islander alone (NH)	0	0	0.00%	0.00%
Other race alone (NH)	0	1	0.00%	0.32%
Mixed race or Multiracial (NH)	5	18	1.35%	5.79%
Hispanic or Latino (any race)	2	2	0.54%	0.64%
Total	371	311	100.00%	100.00%
