= Hissop, Alabama =

- Census-designated place
- Location of Hissop in Coosa County, Alabama.
- Coordinates: 32°52′53″N 86°07′42″W
- Country: United States
- State: Alabama
- County: Coosa

Area
  - Total: 10.93 sq mi (28.31 km^{2})
  - Land: 10.93 sq mi (28.30 km^{2})
  - Water: 0.0039 sq mi (0.01 km^{2})
- Elevation: 761 ft (232 m)

Population (2020)
  - Total: 209
  - Density: 19.1/sq mi (7.39/km^{2})
- Time zone: UTC-6 (Central (CST))
  - Summer (DST): UTC-5 (CDT)
- Area codes: 256 & 938
- GNIS feature ID: 2582680

Hissop is a census-designated place and unincorporated community in Coosa County, Alabama, United States. Its population was 209 as of the 2020 census.

== Demographics ==
Historical population
Census	Pop.	Note	%±
2010	658		—
2020	209		−68.2%
U.S. Decennial Census

Hissop was listed as a census designated place in the 2010 U.S. census.

Hissop CDP, Alabama – Racial and ethnic composition Note: the US Census treats Hispanic/Latino as an ethnic category. This table excludes Latinos from the racial categories and assigns them to a separate category. Hispanics/Latinos may be of any race.
Race / Ethnicity (NH = Non-Hispanic)	Pop 2010	Pop 2020	% 2010	% 2020
White alone (NH)	162	46	24.62%	22.01%
Black or African American alone (NH)	481	156	73.10%	74.64%
Native American or Alaska Native alone (NH)	0	0	0.00%	0.00%
Asian alone (NH)	1	0	0.15%	0.00%
Native Hawaiian or Pacific Islander alone (NH)	0	0	0.00%	0.00%
Other race alone (NH)	0	1	0.00%	0.48%
Mixed race or Multiracial (NH)	1	2	0.15%	0.96%
Hispanic or Latino (any race)	13	4	1.98%	1.91%
Total	658	209	100.00%	100.00%

As of the 2020 United States census, there were 209 people, 203 households, and 80 families residing in the CDP.

== History ==
A post office was established as Hissop in 1880, and remained in operation until it was discontinued in 1990. The community was named after the biblical plant Ezov, usually translated as hyssop.
