= Hanover, Alabama =

- Census-designated place
- Location within Alabama Location within the United States
- Coordinates: 33°00′07″N 86°11′56″W
- Country: United States
- State: Alabama
- County: Coosa

Area
  - Total: 4.23 sq mi (10.96 km^{2})
  - Land: 4.21 sq mi (10.91 km^{2})
  - Water: 0.023 sq mi (0.06 km^{2})
- Elevation: 771 ft (235 m)

Population (2020)
  - Total: 151
  - Density: 35.8/sq mi (13.84/km^{2})
- Time zone: UTC-6 (Central (CST))
  - Summer (DST): UTC-5 (CDT)
- Area codes: 256 & 938, 334
- GNIS feature ID: 2805890

Hanover is a census-designated place in Coosa County, Alabama, United States.

Hanover is likely named for Hanover, Virginia.

A post office operated under the name Hanover from 1847 to 1907.

The Hanover Schist is named for Hanover.

It was first named as a CDP in the 2020 Census which listed a population of 151.

== Demographics ==
Historical population
Census	Pop.	Note	%±
2020	151		—
U.S. Decennial Census; 2020

=== 2020 census ===
Hanover CDP, Alabama – Racial and ethnic composition Note: the US Census treats Hispanic/Latino as an ethnic category. This table excludes Latinos from the racial categories and assigns them to a separate category. Hispanics/Latinos may be of any race.
Race / Ethnicity (NH = Non-Hispanic)	Pop 2020	% 2020
White alone (NH)	139	92.05%
Black or African American alone (NH)	1	0.66%
Native American or Alaska Native alone (NH)	1	0.66%
Asian alone (NH)	0	0.00%
Native Hawaiian or Pacific Islander alone (NH)	0	0.00%
Other race alone (NH)	0	0.00%
Mixed race or Multiracial (NH)	9	5.96%
Hispanic or Latino (any race)	1	0.66%
Total	151	100.00%
