= WSGN (FM) =

- Stewartville, Alabama; United States
- Broadcast area: Sylacauga, Alabama
- Frequency: 98.3 MHz (HD Radio)

Programming
- Format: Oldies
- Subchannels: HD2: Adult contemporary

Ownership
- Owner: Marble City Media LLC
- Sister stations: WAUE, WRFS, WFXO, WYEA

History
- First air date: December 1959
- Former call signs: WMLS-FM (1960–1986); WAWV (1986–2001); WTRB-FM (2001–2008); WTXO (2008–2012); WFXO (2012–2022)

Technical information
- Licensing authority: FCC
- Facility ID: 704
- Class: A
- ERP: 2,700 watts
- HAAT: 151 meters (495 ft)
- Transmitter coordinates: 33°04′20.4″N 86°10′09.4″W
- Translator: HD2: 106.5 W293CQ (Sylacauga)

Links
- Public license information: Public file; LMS
- Webcast: Listen live Listen live (HD2)
- Website: WSGN Online; MIX 106.5 Online (HD2)

WSGN (98.3 FM) is a radio station broadcasting an oldies format. Licensed to Stewartville, Alabama, United States, it serves East Central Alabama. The station is owned and operated by Marble City Media LLC.

Originally licensed in Sylacauga, WSGN first signed on as WMLS-FM in December 1959 and moved to Ashland in 2004. On July 19, 2016, the Federal Communications Commission approved Marble City Media LLC's purchase of the then-WFXO from Williams Communications Inc., and the transfer was completed on August 1, 2016. On October 24, 2016, the FCC approved the station's relocation back to the greater Sylacauga area with a license in Stewartville. The station ceased operation in Ashland on November 24, 2016, and began broadcasting from the Sylacauga area on December 4.

The station's format initially flipped to Contemporary Hit Radio, then moved to Adult Contemporary on January 1, 2017.

Marble City Media LLC also owns and operates stations serving Sylacauga-Childersburg-Talladega, Alexander City-Dadeville-Lake Martin-Wetumpka-Montgomery, and Waverly-Auburn-Opelika.

WFXO changed its format from adult hits to sports, branded as "FOX Sports Central Alabama on 98.3 FM" on August 17, 2020.

On July 27, 2022, it was announced that WFXO would change its format from sports to oldies under the WSGN callsign on July 31, with the WFXO callsign moving to what was then WSGN.

== WFXO-HD2 ==
On May 25, 2018, WFXO began airing the "Yea!106.5" classic hits format on its HD2 subchannel. (That format moved from WYEA 1290 AM Sylacauga, which switched to country.)

On August 3, 2020, WFXO-HD2 changed their format from classic hits to adult contemporary, branded as "MIX 106.5".
