= Dundee, Alabama =

Unincorporated community in Alabama, United States

- Unincorporated community
- Location within Alabama Location within the United States
- Coordinates: 31°07′14″N 85°40′18″W
- Country: United States
- State: Alabama
- County: Geneva
- Elevation: 256 ft (78 m)
- Time zone: UTC-6 (Central (CST))
  - Summer (DST): UTC-5 (CDT)
- Area code: 334
- GNIS feature ID: 117666

Dundee is an unincorporated community in Geneva County, Alabama, United States. It is located on Alabama State Route 123, and is now included in the city limits of Hartford.

== Demographics ==
Historical population
| Census | Pop. | Note | %± |
|---|---|---|---|
| 1900 | 249 | | — |
U.S. Decennial Census

Dundee was listed only on the 1900 U.S. Census, shortly after its incorporation. It was disincorporated shortly thereafter.

== History ==
In February 1899, the charter for the incorporation of Dundee was passed by the Alabama Legislature. A post office operated under the name Dundee from 1880 to 1904. Dundee was disincorporated at some point in the early 1900s.
