= Stewartville, Coosa County, Alabama =

Stewartville, Alabama
- Census-designated place
- Location within Alabama
- Coordinates: 33°04′35″N 86°14′54″W
- Country: United States
- State: Alabama
- County: Coosa

Area
  - Total: 24.27 sq mi (62.86 km^{2})
  - Land: 24.14 sq mi (62.52 km^{2})
  - Water: 0.13 sq mi (0.34 km^{2})
- Elevation: 659 ft (201 m)

Population (2020)
  - Total: 1,662
  - Density: 68.8/sq mi (26.58/km^{2})
- Time zone: UTC-6 (Central (CST))
  - Summer (DST): UTC-5 (CDT)
- Area codes: 256 & 938
- GNIS feature ID: 2582703

Stewartville is a census-designated place and unincorporated community in Coosa County, Alabama, United States. Its population was 1,662 as of the 2020 census.

== Demographics ==
Historical population
Census	Pop.	Note	%±
2010	1,767		—
2020	1,662		−5.9%
U.S. Decennial Census

Stewartville was listed as a census designated place in the 2010 U.S. census.

Stewartville CDP, Alabama – Racial and ethnic composition Note: the US Census treats Hispanic/Latino as an ethnic category. This table excludes Latinos from the racial categories and assigns them to a separate category. Hispanics/Latinos may be of any race.
Race / Ethnicity (NH = Non-Hispanic)	Pop 2010	Pop 2020	% 2010	% 2020
White alone (NH)	1,671	1,533	94.57%	92.24%
Black or African American alone (NH)	61	60	3.45%	3.61%
Native American or Alaska Native alone (NH)	13	5	0.74%	0.30%
Asian alone (NH)	0	0	0.00%	0.00%
Native Hawaiian or Pacific Islander alone (NH)	0	0	0.00%	0.00%
Other race alone (NH)	0	8	0.00%	0.48%
Mixed race or Multiracial (NH)	15	41	0.85%	2.47%
Hispanic or Latino (any race)	7	15	0.40%	0.90%
Total	1,767	1,662	100.00%	100.00%

As of the 2020 United States census, there were 1,662 people, 605 households, and 449 families residing in the CDP.
