= Dollar, Alabama =

Unincorporated community in Alabama, United States

- Unincorporated community
- Location within Alabama Location within the United States
- Coordinates: 32°52′43″N 86°25′27″W
- Country: United States
- State: Alabama
- County: Coosa
- Elevation: 443 ft (135 m)
- Time zone: UTC-6 (Central (CST))
  - Summer (DST): UTC-5 (CDT)
- Area codes: 256 & 938, 334
- GNIS feature ID: 156275

Dollar is an unincorporated community in Coosa County, Alabama, United States.

== History ==
A post office called Dollar was established in 1883, and remained in operation until it was closed in 1921.
