= High Bluff, Alabama =

Unincorporated community in Alabama, United States

- Unincorporated community
- Location within Alabama Location within the United States
- Coordinates: 31°09′24″N 85°43′53″W
- Country: United States
- State: Alabama
- County: Geneva
- Elevation: 272 ft (83 m)
- Time zone: UTC-6 (Central (CST))
  - Summer (DST): UTC-5 (CDT)
- Area code: 334
- GNIS feature ID: 120053

High Bluff, also spelled Highbluff, is an unincorporated community in Geneva County, Alabama, United States. High Bluff is located on Alabama State Route 167, 4.3 miles (6.9 km) north-northwest of Hartford.

== History ==
A post office operated under the name High Bluff from 1890 to 1906.
