= Hatchet, Alabama =

Unincorporated community in Alabama, United States

- Unincorporated community
- Location within Alabama Location within the United States
- Coordinates: 33°01′00″N 86°06′18″W
- Country: United States
- State: Alabama
- County: Coosa
- Elevation: 896 ft (273 m)
- Time zone: UTC-6 (Central (CST))
  - Summer (DST): UTC-5 (CDT)
- Area codes: 256 & 938, 334
- GNIS feature ID: 159732

Hatchet is an unincorporated community in Coosa County, Alabama, United States.
