= Garden City, Alabama =

- Town
- Seal

- Location of Garden City in Cullman County and Blount County, Alabama.
- Coordinates: 34°0′24″N 86°44′58″W
- Country: United States
- State: Alabama
- Counties: Cullman, Blount

Area
  - Total: 2.29 sq mi (5.92 km^{2})
  - Land: 2.26 sq mi (5.85 km^{2})
  - Water: 0.027 sq mi (0.07 km^{2})
- Elevation: 532 ft (162 m)

Population (2020)
  - Total: 528
  - Density: 233.8/sq mi (90.27/km^{2})
- Time zone: UTC-6 (Central (CST))
  - Summer (DST): UTC-5 (CDT)
- ZIP code: 35070
- Area code: 256
- FIPS code: 01-29032
- GNIS feature ID: 2406541
- Website: https://www.gardencityal.gov/

Garden City is a town in Cullman and Blount counties in the U.S. state of Alabama. At the 2020 census, the population was 528. Garden City was founded by Johann Cullmann, namesake of Cullman County in 1873 after founding Cullman, Alabama. It was located in Blount County and was incorporated in 1878 (although other sources claim 1911). Cullman County was created in 1877. Garden City was annexed by Cullman County with a shift in county borders until 1901. After a lapse in its incorporation, it was re-incorporated in 1950.

== Geography ==
Garden City is located near the southeastern border of Cullman County. The Mulberry Fork of the Black Warrior River forms the county line and the southeastern border of the town. U.S. Route 31 (1st Avenue) passes through the center of the town, leading north 13 miles (21 km) to Cullman, the county seat, and south 39 miles (63 km) to Birmingham.

According to the U.S. Census Bureau, the town has a total area of 3.1 square miles (7.9 km^{2}), of which 3.0 square miles (7.8 km^{2}) is land and 0.039 square miles (0.1 km^{2}), or 0.84%, is water.

=== Climate ===
The climate in this area is characterized by hot, humid summers and generally mild to cool winters. According to the Köppen Climate Classification system, Garden City has a humid subtropical climate, abbreviated "Cfa" on climate maps.

== Demographics ==
Historical population
Census	Pop.	Note	%±
1950	534		—
1960	536		0.4%
1970	745		39.0%
1980	655		−12.1%
1990	578		−11.8%
2000	564		−2.4%
2010	492		−12.8%
2020	528		7.3%
U.S. Decennial Census; 2013 Estimate

As of the census of 2000, there were 564 people, 238 households, and 162 families residing in the town. The population density was 247.1 inhabitants per square mile (95.4/km^{2}). There were 255 housing units at an average density of 111.7 per square mile (43.1/km^{2}). The racial makeup of the town was 99.29% White, 0.53% from other races, and 0.18% from two or more races. 0.89% of the population were Hispanic or Latino of any race.

There were 238 households, out of which 25.6% had children under the age of 18 living with them, 56.3% were married couples living together, 10.9% had a female householder with no husband present, and 31.9% were non-families. 28.6% of all households were made up of individuals, and 11.3% had someone living alone who was 65 years of age or older. The average household size was 2.37 and the average family size was 2.90.

In the town, the population was spread out, with 21.5% under the age of 18, 9.9% from 18 to 24, 27.0% from 25 to 44, 24.6% from 45 to 64, and 17.0% who were 65 years of age or older. The median age was 38 years. For every 100 females, there were 98.6 males. For every 100 females age 18 and over, there were 89.3 males.

The median income for a household in the town was $28,000, and the median income for a family was $37,031. Males had a median income of $25,583 versus $20,000 for females. The per capita income for the town was $13,793. About 7.4% of families and 10.7% of the population were below the poverty line, including 7.8% of those under age 18 and 16.7% of those age 65 or over.
