= WRFS (FM) =

- Rockford, Alabama; United States
- Frequency: 105.1 MHz
- Branding: 105.1 WRFS - The Lake

Programming
- Format: Classic hits

Ownership
- Owner: Marble City Media, LLC
- Sister stations: WAUE; WFXO; WSGN; WYEA

History
- First air date: 2014

Technical information
- Licensing authority: FCC
- Facility ID: 190442
- Class: A
- ERP: 6,000 watts
- HAAT: 100 meters (330 ft)
- Transmitter coordinates: 32°53′36.8″N 86°12′19.6″W

Links
- Public license information: Public file; LMS
- Webcast: Listen live
- Website: www.1051wrfs.com

WRFS (105.1 FM) is a radio station licensed to serve the community of Rockford, Alabama. The station is owned by Marble City Media, LLC and airs a classic hits format.

The station was assigned the WRFS call letters by the Federal Communications Commission on January 22, 2014.
