= Fishpond.co.nz =

New Zealand e-commerce company

Fishpond Ltd.
- Company type: Private
- Industry: Bookselling, online shopping, retail
- Founded: 2004
- Headquarters: Auckland, New Zealand
- Key people: Daniel Robertson (founder); Ben Powles (CEO)
- Products: Books, DVDs, CDs, toys, household goods, cosmetics, electronics
- Number of employees: 100
- Website: www.fishpond.co.nz

Fishpond Ltd. is a New Zealand e-commerce company. It was one of the first major companies to sell books over the Internet in New Zealand. Founded by Daniel Robertson in 2004, Fishpond.co.nz is a full-scale online bookstore. It also sells DVDs, music CDs, toys, household goods, cosmetics, and electronics. It is part of a larger business called WorldFront.

The company is headquartered in Auckland, with staff in Auckland, Christchurch, Melbourne, and Perth. It maintains software development centres in Auckland and Christchurch. Fishpond.com.au has a separate website in Australia.

In the middle of 2013, Fishpond had nearly 13 million items in its catalogue and was making 20,000 sales per day. By 2018, its catalogue had increased to over 25 million items, and it was selling a product every 1.2 seconds.

== International availability ==
Fishpond is also available in other countries with localised currency pricing.

Country	Domain name
New Zealand	fishpond.co.nz
Australia	fishpond.com.au
Singapore	fishpond.com.sg
Germany	fishpond.de
Fiji	fishpond.com.fj
Malaysia	fishpond.com.my
Israel	fishpond.co.il
United Kingdom	fishpond.co.uk
Turkey	fishpond.com.tr
Other Countries	TBA
