= Highfalls, Alabama =

Unincorporated community in Alabama, United States

- Unincorporated community
- Location within Alabama Location within the United States
- Coordinates: 31°05′55″N 85°48′00″W
- Country: United States
- State: Alabama
- County: Geneva
- Elevation: 253 ft (77 m)
- Time zone: UTC-6 (Central (CST))
  - Summer (DST): UTC-5 (CDT)
- Area code: 334
- GNIS feature ID: 156472

Highfalls is an unincorporated community in Geneva County, Alabama, United States.

== History ==
A post office operated under the name Highfalls from 1874 to 1899.
