= Coosa County, Alabama =

County in Alabama, United States

- County
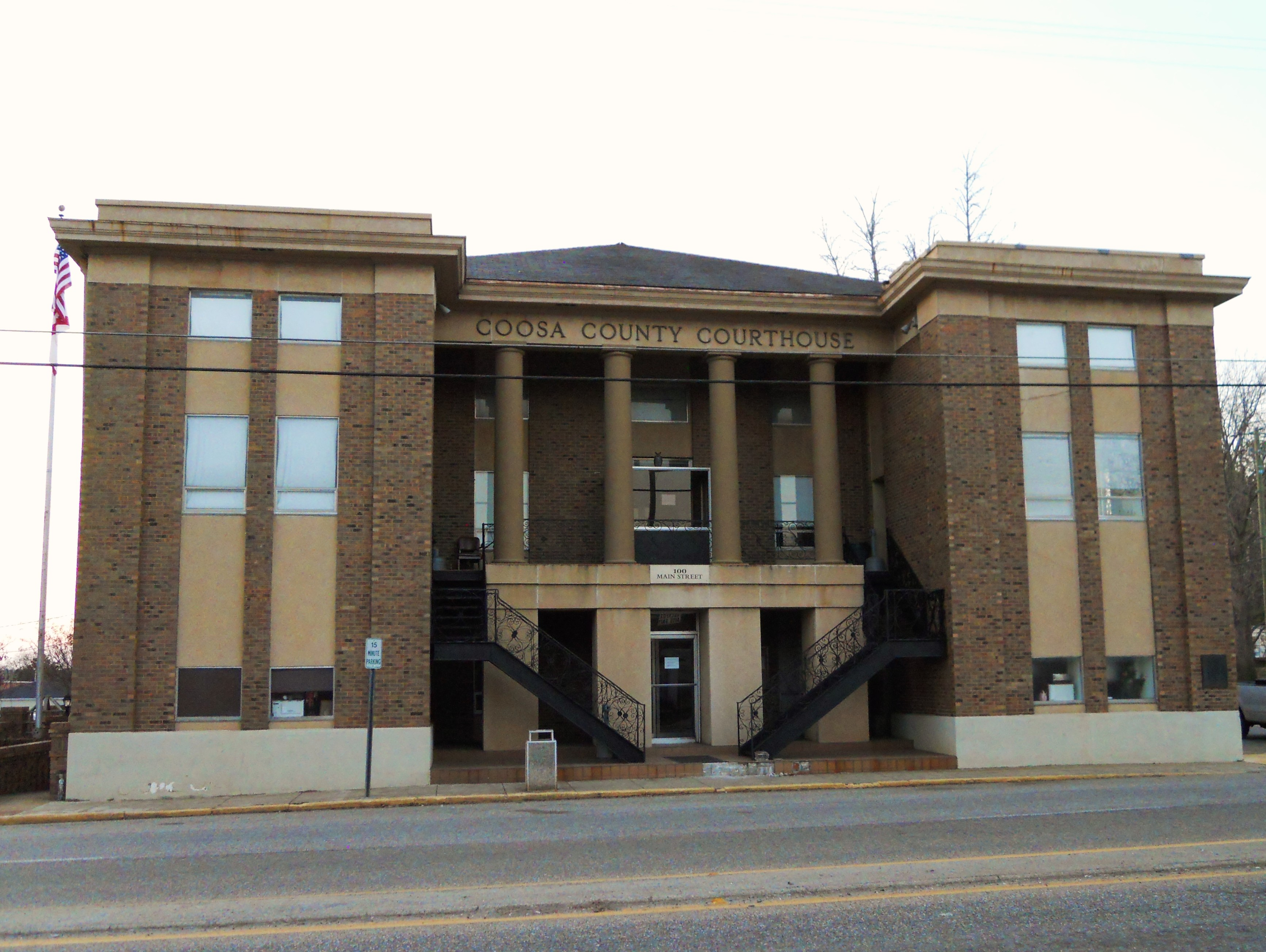
- Coosa County Courthouse in Rockford

- Logo

- Location within the U.S. state of Alabama
- Coordinates: 32°56′11″N 86°14′47″W
- Country: United States
- State: Alabama
- Founded: December 18, 1832
- Seat: Rockford
- Largest city: Goodwater

Area
  - Total: 666 sq mi (1,720 km^{2})
  - Land: 651 sq mi (1,690 km^{2})
  - Water: 15 sq mi (39 km^{2}) 2.3%

Population (2020)
  - Total: 10,387
  - Estimate (2025): 10,161 ▼
  - Density: 16.0/sq mi (6.16/km^{2})
- Time zone: UTC−6 (Central)
  - Summer (DST): UTC−5 (CDT)
- Congressional district: 6th
- Website: www.coosacountyal.com
- County Number 22 on Alabama Licence Plates

Coosa County is a county located in the east central portion of the U.S. state of Alabama. As of the 2020 census the population was 10,387. Its county seat is Rockford. Its name derives from a town of the Creek tribe and the Coosa River, which forms one of the county borders.

Coosa County is included in the Talladega-Sylacauga, AL Micropolitan Statistical Area, which is also included in the Birmingham-Hoover-Talladega, AL Combined Statistical Area.

== History ==
The county was established on December 18, 1832, formed from parts of Montgomery and Shelby counties. It gained a small snippet from Montgomery County in 1837 and lost a portion to the south upon the creation of Elmore County in 1866.

== Geography ==
According to the United States Census Bureau, the county has a total area of 666 square miles (1,720 km^{2}), of which 651 square miles (1,690 km^{2}) is land and 15 square miles (39 km^{2}) (2.3%) is water. The county is located in the Piedmont region of the state.

=== Major highways ===
- U.S. Highway 231 / State Route 21 (unsigned) / State Route 53 (unsigned)
- U.S. Highway 280 / State Route 38 (unsigned)
- Alabama State Route 9
- Alabama State Route 22
- Alabama State Route 115
- Alabama State Route 259

=== Adjacent counties ===
- Talladega County (north)
- Clay County (northeast)
- Tallapoosa County (east)
- Elmore County (south)
- Chilton County (west)
- Shelby County (northwest)

== Demographics ==
Historical population
Census	Pop.	Note	%±
1840	6,995		—
1850	14,543		107.9%
1860	19,273		32.5%
1870	11,945		−38.0%
1880	15,113		26.5%
1890	15,906		5.2%
1900	16,144		1.5%
1910	16,634		3.0%
1920	14,839		−10.8%
1930	12,460		−16.0%
1940	13,460		8.0%
1950	11,766		−12.6%
1960	10,726		−8.8%
1970	10,662		−0.6%
1980	11,377		6.7%
1990	11,063		−2.8%
2000	12,202		10.3%
2010	11,539		−5.4%
2020	10,387		−10.0%
2025 (est.)	10,161	▼	−2.2%
U.S. Decennial Census; 1790–1960 1900–1990; 1990–2000 2010–2020

=== 2020 census ===
As of the 2020 census, the county had a population of 10,387. The median age was 48.9 years. 17.2% of residents were under the age of 18 and 23.1% of residents were 65 years of age or older. For every 100 females there were 101.3 males, and for every 100 females age 18 and over there were 101.4 males age 18 and over.

The racial makeup of the county was 65.7% White, 29.0% Black or African American, 0.3% American Indian and Alaska Native, 0.1% Asian, 0.0% Native Hawaiian and Pacific Islander, 1.6% from some other race, and 3.4% from two or more races. Hispanic or Latino residents of any race comprised 1.9% of the population.

0.0% of residents lived in urban areas, while 100.0% lived in rural areas.

There were 4,451 households in the county, of which 24.1% had children under the age of 18 living with them and 27.7% had a female householder with no spouse or partner present. About 31.5% of all households were made up of individuals and 14.1% had someone living alone who was 65 years of age or older.

There were 5,999 housing units, of which 25.8% were vacant. Among occupied housing units, 78.2% were owner-occupied and 21.8% were renter-occupied. The homeowner vacancy rate was 1.4% and the rental vacancy rate was 5.7%.

=== Racial and ethnic composition ===
Coosa County, Alabama – Racial and ethnic composition Note: the US Census treats Hispanic/Latino as an ethnic category. This table excludes Latinos from the racial categories and assigns them to a separate category. Hispanics/Latinos may be of any race.
Race / Ethnicity (NH = Non-Hispanic)	Pop 2000	Pop 2010	Pop 2020	% 2000	% 2010	% 2020
White alone (NH)	7,742	7,604	6,807	63.45%	65.90%	65.53%
Black or African American alone (NH)	4,147	3,556	3,000	33.99%	30.82%	28.88%
Native American or Alaska Native alone (NH)	39	40	25	0.32%	0.35%	0.24%
Asian alone (NH)	5	14	8	0.04%	0.12%	0.08%
Native Hawaiian or Pacific Islander alone (NH)	0	0	0	0.00%	0.00%	0.00%
Other race alone (NH)	9	7	47	0.07%	0.06%	0.45%
Mixed race or Multiracial (NH)	102	88	299	0.84%	0.76%	2.88%
Hispanic or Latino (any race)	158	230	201	1.29%	1.99%	1.94%
Total	12,202	11,539	10,387	100.00%	100.00%	100.00%

=== 2010 census ===
As of the census of 2010, there were 11,539 people, 4,794 households, and 3,293 families living in the county. The population density was 18 people per square mile (6.9 people/km^{2}). There were 6,478 housing units at an average density of 9.7 per square mile (/km^{3.8}). The racial makeup of the county was 66.3% White, 31.0% Black or African American, 0.3% Native American, 0.1% Asian, 0.1% Pacific Islander, 1.2% from other races, and 0.9% from two or more races. 2.0% of the population were Hispanic or Latino of any race.

There were 4,794 households, out of which 23.0% had children under the age of 18 living with them, 49.5% were married couples living together, 14.1% had a female householder with no husband present, and 31.3% were non-families. 27.9% of all households were made up of individuals, and 11.1% had someone living alone who was 65 years of age or older. The average household size was 2.38 and the average family size was 2.89.

In the county, the population was spread out, with 20.5% under the age of 18, 7.4% from 18 to 24, 23.2% from 25 to 44, 31.8% from 45 to 64, and 17.1% who were 65 years of age or older. The median age was 44.2 years. For every 100 females, there were 98.5 males. For every 100 females age 18 and over, there were 98.7 males.

The median income for a household in the county was $35,560, and the median income for a family was $47,451. Males had a median income of $40,315 versus $26,826 for females. The per capita income for the county was $19,209. About 11.4% of families and 16.0% of the population were below the poverty line, including 20.6% of those under age 18 and 14.2% of those age 65 or over.

From 2000 to 2003, Coosa County's growth rate of -5.8% made it the biggest percentage population loser among the state's 67 counties. Annette Jones Watters of the University of Alabama's Alabama State Data Center cited Coosa as one of eight counties to lose greater than 6% of its population from 2000 to early 2007.

=== 2000 census ===
As of the census of 2000, there were 12,202 people, 4,682 households, and 3,408 families living in the county. The population density was 19 people per square mile (7.3 people/km^{2}). There were 6,142 housing units at an average density of 9 units per square mile (3.5 units/km^{2}). The racial makeup of the county was 63.94% White, 34.19% Black or African American, 0.32% Native American, 0.04% Asian, 0.01% Pacific Islander, 0.62% from other races, and 0.88% from two or more races. 1.29% of the population were Hispanic or Latino of any race.

There were 4,682 households, out of which 30.00% had children under the age of 18 living with them, 54.80% were married couples living together, 13.50% had a female householder with no husband present, and 27.20% were non-families. 24.30% of all households were made up of individuals, and 9.80% had someone living alone who was 65 years of age or older. The average household size was 2.52 and the average family size was 2.98.

In the county, the population was spread out, with 23.70% under the age of 18, 8.60% from 18 to 24, 29.00% from 25 to 44, 24.30% from 45 to 64, and 14.40% who were 65 years of age or older. The median age was 38 years. For every 100 females, there were 104.40 males. For every 100 females age 18 and over, there were 102.50 males.

The median income for a household in the county was $29,873, and the median income for a family was $36,082. Males had a median income of $25,390 versus $18,171 for females. The per capita income for the county was $14,875. About 11.80% of families and 14.90% of the population were below the poverty line, including 19.50% of those under age 18 and 13.40% of those age 65 or over.

== Government ==
Coosa County is reliably Republican at the presidential level. The last Democrat to win the county in a presidential election is Bill Clinton, who won it by a slim majority in 1996.

United States presidential election results for Coosa County, Alabama
Year	Republican		Democratic		Third party(ies)	
Year	No.	%	No.	%	No.	%
1904	472	30.99%	933	61.26%	118	7.75%
1908	447	35.93%	717	57.64%	80	6.43%
1912	109	9.04%	763	63.27%	334	27.69%
1916	485	34.92%	867	62.42%	37	2.66%
1920	741	42.01%	1,007	57.09%	16	0.91%
1924	508	38.66%	790	60.12%	16	1.22%
1928	1,078	60.63%	699	39.31%	1	0.06%
1932	250	16.34%	1,265	82.68%	15	0.98%
1936	239	14.78%	1,346	83.24%	32	1.98%
1940	317	18.90%	1,347	80.32%	13	0.78%
1944	394	26.60%	1,079	72.86%	8	0.54%
1948	275	24.47%	0	0.00%	849	75.53%
1952	788	34.40%	1,501	65.52%	2	0.09%
1956	1,070	42.48%	1,411	56.01%	38	1.51%
1960	1,073	41.67%	1,493	57.98%	9	0.35%
1964	1,978	72.77%	0	0.00%	740	27.23%
1968	330	8.66%	623	16.35%	2,858	74.99%
1972	2,672	77.20%	773	22.33%	16	0.46%
1976	1,196	31.76%	2,533	67.26%	37	0.98%
1980	1,714	40.72%	2,383	56.62%	112	2.66%
1984	2,585	58.95%	1,781	40.62%	19	0.43%
1988	2,405	56.15%	1,860	43.43%	18	0.42%
1992	1,973	41.12%	2,330	48.56%	495	10.32%
1996	1,721	41.66%	2,121	51.34%	289	7.00%
2000	2,382	52.16%	2,104	46.07%	81	1.77%
2004	2,905	58.09%	2,055	41.09%	41	0.82%
2008	3,248	58.39%	2,273	40.86%	42	0.75%
2012	3,049	57.72%	2,191	41.48%	42	0.80%
2016	3,381	64.38%	1,782	33.93%	89	1.69%
2020	3,631	66.27%	1,796	32.78%	52	0.95%
2024	3,758	71.34%	1,478	28.06%	32	0.61%

United States Senate election results for Coosa County, Alabama2
Year	Republican		Democratic		Third party(ies)	
Year	No.	%	No.	%	No.	%
2020	3,559	65.10%	1,899	34.74%	9	0.16%

United States Senate election results for Coosa County, Alabama3
Year	Republican		Democratic		Third party(ies)	
Year	No.	%	No.	%	No.	%
2022	2,662	69.76%	1,042	27.31%	112	2.94%

Alabama Gubernatorial election results for Coosa County
Year	Republican		Democratic		Third party(ies)	
Year	No.	%	No.	%	No.	%
2022	2,685	70.12%	1,001	26.14%	143	3.73%

== Communities ==
=== Towns ===
- Goodwater
- Kellyton
- Rockford (county seat)

=== Census-designated places ===
- Equality
- Hanover
- Hissop
- Mount Olive
- Nixburg
- Ray
- Stewartville
- Weogufka

=== Unincorporated communities ===
- Dollar
- Fishpond
- Hatchet
- Marble Valley

== See also ==
- Coosa County School District
- National Register of Historic Places listings in Coosa County, Alabama
- Properties on the Alabama Register of Landmarks and Heritage in Coosa County, Alabama
