= Geneva County, Alabama =

County in Alabama, United States

- County
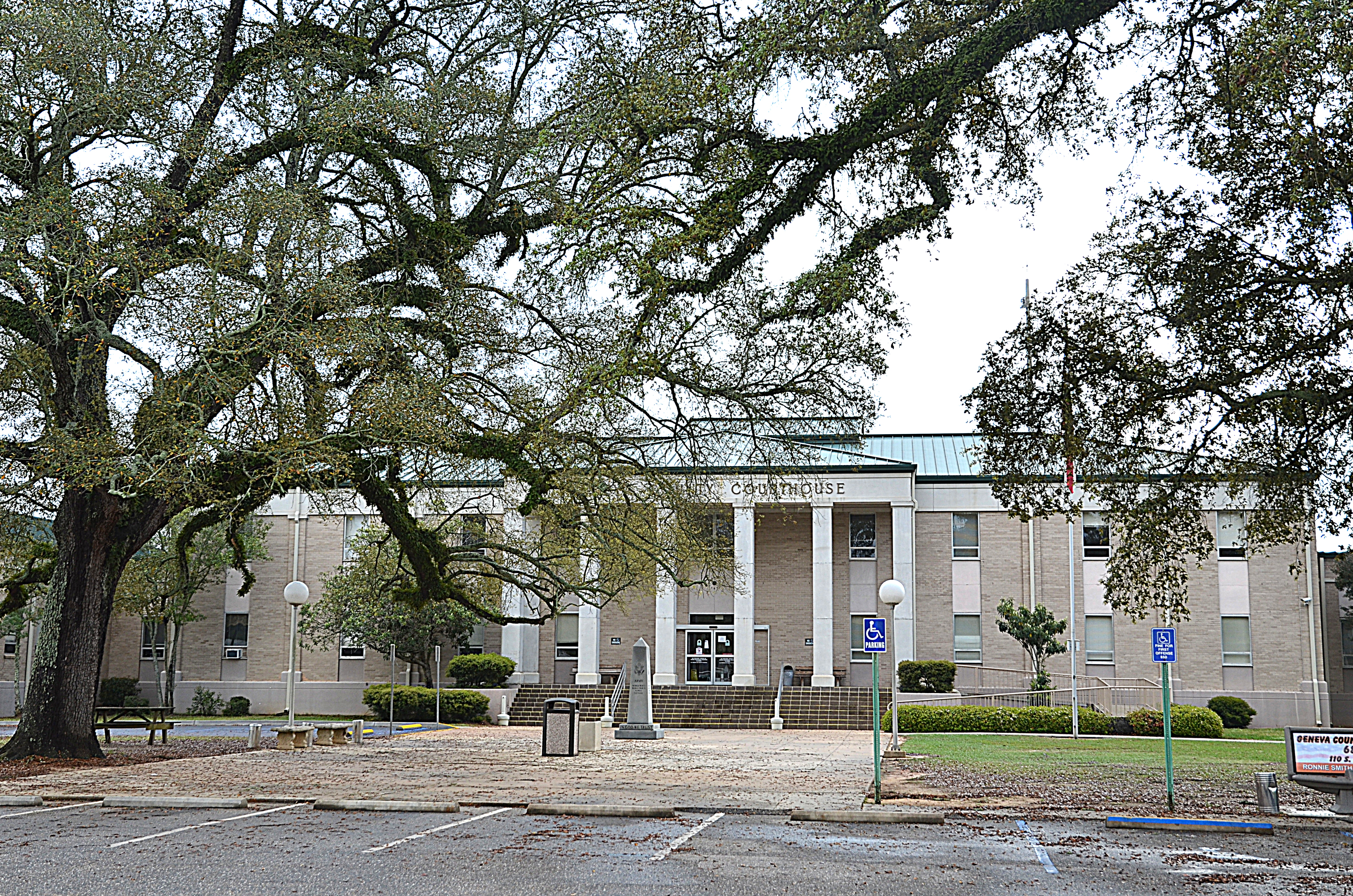
- The Geneva County Courthouse in Geneva

- Logo

- Location within the U.S. state of Alabama
- Coordinates: 31°05′32″N 85°50′18″W
- Country: United States
- State: Alabama
- Founded: December 26, 1868
- Named for: Geneva, New York
- Seat: Geneva
- Largest city: Geneva

Area
  - Total: 579 sq mi (1,500 km^{2})
  - Land: 574 sq mi (1,490 km^{2})
  - Water: 4.5 sq mi (12 km^{2}) 0.8%

Population (2020)
  - Total: 26,659
  - Estimate (2025): 27,554 ▲
  - Density: 46.4/sq mi (17.9/km^{2})
- Time zone: UTC−6 (Central)
  - Summer (DST): UTC−5 (CDT)
- Congressional district: 1st
- Website: genevacountyal.gov
- County Number 34 on Alabama Licence Plates

Geneva County is a county located in the southern part of the U.S. state of Alabama. As of the 2020 census, the population was 26,659. Its county seat is Geneva. Geneva County is a dry county. However, beer and wine are sold in the city limits of Geneva, Samson, Slocomb, and most recently in Hartford, after residents voted to become wet in a 2022 election.

Geneva County is part of the Dothan, Alabama metropolitan area.

== History ==
Geneva County was established on December 26, 1868 from Coffee, Dale, and Henry counties. The county was named after its county seat, which in turn was named after Geneva, New York, which was named after Geneva, Switzerland, by Walter H. Yonge, an early town resident and Swiss native.

The county was declared a disaster area in September 1979 due to damage from Hurricane Frederic.

== 2009 shooting ==
On March 10, 2009, a gunman, identified as Michael McLendon, went on a shooting spree at nine locations in Geneva County from the town of Samson to the city of Geneva, and committed arson. The bodies of eleven people were recovered after McLendon committed suicide.

According to the United States Census Bureau, the county has a total area of 579 square miles (1,500 km^{2}), of which 574 square miles (1,490 km^{2}) is land and 4.5 square miles (12 km^{2}) (0.8%) is water. The county is located in the Wiregrass region of southeast Alabama.

It is the fifth-smallest county in Alabama by total area.

=== Major highways ===
- State Route 27
- State Route 52
- State Route 54
- State Route 85
- State Route 87
- State Route 103
- State Route 123
- State Route 153
- State Route 167
- State Route 196

=== Adjacent counties ===
- Dale County (north-northeast)
- Houston County (east)
- Jackson County, Florida (southeast)
- Holmes County, Florida (south)
- Walton County, Florida (southwest)
- Covington County (west)
- Coffee County (north-northwest)

== Demographics ==
Historical population
Census	Pop.	Note	%±
1870	2,959		—
1880	4,342		46.7%
1890	10,690		146.2%
1900	19,096		78.6%
1910	26,230		37.4%
1920	29,315		11.8%
1930	30,104		2.7%
1940	29,172		−3.1%
1950	25,899		−11.2%
1960	22,310		−13.9%
1970	21,924		−1.7%
1980	24,253		10.6%
1990	23,647		−2.5%
2000	25,764		9.0%
2010	26,790		4.0%
2020	26,659		−0.5%
2025 (est.)	27,554	▲	3.4%
U.S. Decennial Census; 1790–1960 1900–1990; 1990–2000 2010–2020

=== Racial and ethnic composition ===
Geneva County, Alabama – Racial and ethnic composition Note: the US Census treats Hispanic/Latino as an ethnic category. This table excludes Latinos from the racial categories and assigns them to a separate category. Hispanics/Latinos may be of any race.
Race / Ethnicity (NH = Non-Hispanic)	Pop 2000	Pop 2010	Pop 2020	% 2000	% 2010	% 2020
White alone (NH)	22,181	22,692	21,654	86.09%	84.70%	81.23%
Black or African American alone (NH)	2,725	2,523	2,231	10.58%	9.42%	8.37%
Native American or Alaska Native alone (NH)	187	197	166	0.73%	0.74%	0.62%
Asian alone (NH)	32	64	86	0.12%	0.24%	0.32%
Pacific Islander alone (NH)	6	8	7	0.02%	0.03%	0.03%
Other race alone (NH)	11	15	72	0.04%	0.06%	0.27%
Mixed race or Multiracial (NH)	169	371	1,147	0.66%	1.38%	4.30%
Hispanic or Latino (any race)	453	920	1,296	1.76%	3.43%	4.86%
Total	25,764	26,790	26,659	100.00%	100.00%	100.00%

=== 2020 census ===
As of the 2020 census, the county had a population of 26,659. The median age was 43.8 years. 21.9% of residents were under the age of 18 and 21.1% of residents were 65 years of age or older. For every 100 females there were 96.4 males, and for every 100 females age 18 and over there were 93.8 males age 18 and over.

The racial makeup of the county was 82.8% White, 8.4% Black or African American, 0.7% American Indian and Alaska Native, 0.3% Asian, 0.0% Native Hawaiian and Pacific Islander, 2.0% from some other race, and 5.7% from two or more races. Hispanic or Latino residents of any race comprised 4.9% of the population.

0.6% of residents lived in urban areas, while 99.4% lived in rural areas.

There were 10,874 households in the county, of which 28.8% had children under the age of 18 living with them and 27.8% had a female householder with no spouse or partner present. About 28.8% of all households were made up of individuals and 14.2% had someone living alone who was 65 years of age or older.

There were 12,452 housing units, of which 12.7% were vacant. Among occupied housing units, 73.1% were owner-occupied and 26.9% were renter-occupied. The homeowner vacancy rate was 1.2% and the rental vacancy rate was 7.2%.

=== 2010 ===
The 2010 United States census has the breakdown as:

- 86.3% White
- 9.5% Black
- 0.8% Native American
- 0.3% Asian
- 0.0% Native Hawaiian or Pacific Islander
- 1.6% Two or more races
- 3.4% Hispanic or Latino (of any race)

=== 2000 ===
As of the census of 2000, there were 25,764 people, 10,477 households, and 7,459 families residing in the county. The population density was 45 people per square mile (17 people/km^{2}). There were 12,115 housing units at an average density of 21 units per square mile (8.1 units/km^{2}). The racial makeup of the county was 87.11% White, 10.65% Black or African American, 0.76% Native American, 0.12% Asian, 0.02% Pacific Islander, 0.62% from other races, and 0.72% from two or more races. 1.76% of the population were Hispanic or Latino of any race.

There were 10,477 households, out of which 30.60% had children under the age of 18 living with them, 56.40% were married couples living together, 11.00% had a female householder with no husband present, and 28.80% were non-families. 26.30% of all households were made up of individuals, and 12.30% had someone living alone who was 65 years of age or older. The average household size was 2.43 and the average family size was 2.92.

In the county, the population was spread out, with 24.00% under the age of 18, 7.50% from 18 to 24, 26.80% from 25 to 44, 25.30% from 45 to 64, and 16.30% who were 65 years of age or older. The median age was 39 years. For every 100 females, there were 94.70 males. For every 100 women age 18 and over, there were 90.00 men.

The median income for a household in the county was $26,448, and the median income for a family was $32,563. Males had a median income of $26,018 versus $19,341 for females. The per capita income for the county was $14,620. About 15.90% of families and 19.60% of the population were below the poverty line, including 27.20% of those under age 18 and 21.80% of those age 65 or over.

== Communities ==
=== Cities ===
- Geneva (county seat)
- Hartford
- Samson
- Slocomb

=== Towns ===
- Black
- Coffee Springs
- Malvern
- Taylor (partly in Houston County)

=== Census-designated place ===
- Eunola

=== Unincorporated communities ===
- Bellwood
- Chancellor
- Dundee
- Earlytown
- Fadette
- Hacoda
- High Bluff
- Highfalls
- Highnote

== Government and politics ==
Much like the state and the rest of the Deep South, Geneva County was locked for the Democrats before 1964, until Herbert Hoover won against Democratic nominee Al Smith in 1928 by 48 votes. However, ever since 1980, Geneva County has been a Republican stronghold. The last Democrat to carry the county was Deep South native Jimmy Carter in 1976.

Geneva is also noteworthy for being the best county in the country for Alabama native George Wallace in the 1968 election, where his main support was from the Deep South and was strongest in the Wiregrass and Piney Woods regions.

United States presidential election results for Geneva County, Alabama
Year	Republican		Democratic		Third party(ies)	
Year	No.	%	No.	%	No.	%
1872	55	17.41%	261	82.59%	0	0.00%
1876	2	0.49%	408	99.51%	0	0.00%
1880	6	1.29%	460	98.71%	0	0.00%
1884	0	0.00%	488	99.19%	4	0.81%
1888	5	0.63%	794	99.37%	0	0.00%
1892	0	0.00%	797	52.61%	718	47.39%
1896	46	3.40%	1,246	92.16%	60	4.44%
1900	657	44.97%	679	46.48%	125	8.56%
1904	473	31.12%	743	48.88%	304	20.00%
1908	500	32.87%	854	56.15%	167	10.98%
1912	99	6.44%	891	57.93%	548	35.63%
1916	713	35.42%	1,265	62.84%	35	1.74%
1920	1,088	41.65%	1,488	56.97%	36	1.38%
1924	477	27.85%	1,191	69.53%	45	2.63%
1928	1,533	50.80%	1,485	49.20%	0	0.00%
1932	270	9.53%	2,559	90.33%	4	0.14%
1936	295	10.00%	2,652	89.93%	2	0.07%
1940	364	12.37%	2,565	87.19%	13	0.44%
1944	385	16.01%	2,004	83.36%	15	0.62%
1948	286	13.47%	0	0.00%	1,837	86.53%
1952	950	25.98%	2,703	73.93%	3	0.08%
1956	1,179	28.63%	2,841	68.99%	98	2.38%
1960	1,502	32.95%	3,050	66.90%	7	0.15%
1964	4,502	80.74%	0	0.00%	1,074	19.26%
1968	284	3.31%	380	4.43%	7,917	92.26%
1972	5,851	84.33%	1,049	15.12%	38	0.55%
1976	2,663	30.47%	5,983	68.46%	93	1.06%
1980	4,747	49.30%	4,703	48.85%	178	1.85%
1984	6,308	70.00%	2,330	25.86%	373	4.14%
1988	5,703	67.32%	2,685	31.69%	84	0.99%
1992	4,843	49.08%	3,622	36.71%	1,402	14.21%
1996	4,725	52.60%	3,174	35.33%	1,084	12.07%
2000	6,588	68.92%	2,769	28.97%	202	2.11%
2004	8,342	79.30%	2,113	20.09%	65	0.62%
2008	9,417	80.78%	2,134	18.31%	106	0.91%
2012	9,175	80.97%	2,039	17.99%	117	1.03%
2016	9,994	85.00%	1,525	12.97%	239	2.03%
2020	10,848	86.47%	1,595	12.71%	102	0.81%
2024	10,929	88.13%	1,391	11.22%	81	0.65%

United States Senate election results for Geneva County, Alabama2
Year	Republican		Democratic		Third party(ies)	
Year	No.	%	No.	%	No.	%
2020	10,382	82.91%	2,122	16.95%	18	0.14%

United States Senate election results for Geneva County, Alabama3
Year	Republican		Democratic		Third party(ies)	
Year	No.	%	No.	%	No.	%
2022	7,113	89.16%	763	9.56%	102	1.28%

Alabama Gubernatorial election results for Geneva County
Year	Republican		Democratic		Third party(ies)	
Year	No.	%	No.	%	No.	%
2022	7,049	88.36%	700	8.77%	229	2.87%

== Education ==
There are two school districts including parts of the county: Geneva City School District and Geneva County School District.

== See also ==
- National Register of Historic Places listings in Geneva County, Alabama
- Properties on the Alabama Register of Landmarks and Heritage in Geneva County, Alabama
