= Earlytown, Alabama =

Unincorporated community in Alabama, United States

- Unincorporated community
- Location within Alabama Location within the United States
- Coordinates: 31°07′43″N 86°07′46″W
- Country: United States
- State: Alabama
- County: Geneva
- Elevation: 226 ft (69 m)
- Time zone: UTC-6 (Central (CST))
  - Summer (DST): UTC-5 (CDT)
- Area code: 334
- GNIS feature ID: 117728

EarlyTown, Alabama is an unincorporated community located in [insert county name], Alabama, United States. The town traces its origins to the late 19th century when members of the Early family settled in the area after relocating from West Virginia. The family had originally emigrated from Ireland before moving south in search of new opportunities.

Upon establishing themselves in Alabama, the Early family founded a sawmill that became a central part of the local economy. The success of the sawmill provided jobs and economic stability to the surrounding community, fostering growth and development in the region. In recognition of the family’s contributions, the area became known as EarlyTown.

Today, EarlyTown remains a small rural community with historical ties to the timber industry and to the broader narrative of Irish-American migration and settlement in the southern United States. State Route 54 on State Route 52.
