= Slocomb, Alabama =

City in Alabama, United States

Slocomb
- City
- Location of Slocomb in Geneva County, Alabama
- Coordinates: 31°07′18″N 85°35′43″W
- Country: United States
- State: Alabama
- County: Geneva

Area
  - Total: 9.50 sq mi (24.60 km^{2})
  - Land: 9.49 sq mi (24.58 km^{2})
  - Water: 0.012 sq mi (0.03 km^{2})
- Elevation: 289 ft (88 m)

Population (2020)
  - Total: 2,082
  - Density: 219.4/sq mi (84.72/km^{2})
- Time zone: UTC-6 (Central (CST))
  - Summer (DST): UTC-5 (CDT)
- ZIP code: 36375
- Area code: 334
- FIPS code: 01-71040
- GNIS feature ID: 2405471
- Website: cityofslocomb.org

Slocomb is a city in Geneva County, Alabama, United States. It is part of the Dothan, Alabama Metropolitan Statistical Area. At the 2020 census, the population was 2,082. The community is named after postmaster Frank W. Slocomb.

Slocomb incorporated in 1901. Slocomb calls itself the "home of the tomato." Slocomb High School mascot is the "Redtop".

== Geography ==
According to the U.S. Census Bureau, the city has a total area of 9.5 square miles (25 km^{2}), all land.

== Demographics ==
Historical population
Census	Pop.	Note	%±
1910	896		—
1920	581		−35.2%
1930	964		65.9%
1940	1,041		8.0%
1950	1,219		17.1%
1960	1,368		12.2%
1970	1,883		37.6%
1980	2,153		14.3%
1990	1,906		−11.5%
2000	2,052		7.7%
2010	1,980		−3.5%
2020	2,082		5.2%
U.S. Decennial Census; 2013 Estimate

=== 2020 census ===
Slocomb racial composition
Race	Num.	Perc.
White (non-Hispanic)	1,444	69.36%
Black or African American (non-Hispanic)	346	16.62%
Native American	8	0.38%
Asian	8	0.38%
Pacific Islander	2	0.1%
Other/Mixed	130	6.24%
Hispanic or Latino	144	6.92%

As of the 2020 census, Slocomb had a population of 2,082. The median age was 43.4 years. 20.9% of residents were under the age of 18 and 19.3% of residents were 65 years of age or older. For every 100 females there were 94.4 males, and for every 100 females age 18 and over there were 90.7 males age 18 and over.

0.0% of residents lived in urban areas, while 100.0% lived in rural areas.

There were 852 households in Slocomb, of which 28.9% had children under the age of 18 living in them. Of all households, 42.5% were married-couple households, 19.5% were households with a male householder and no spouse or partner present, and 31.1% were households with a female householder and no spouse or partner present. About 29.0% of all households were made up of individuals and 14.9% had someone living alone who was 65 years of age or older. The city had 525 families.

There were 988 housing units, of which 13.8% were vacant. The homeowner vacancy rate was 2.3% and the rental vacancy rate was 6.2%.

=== 2010 census ===
As of the census of 2010, there were 1,980 people, 816 households, and 554 families residing in the city. The population density was 208.4 inhabitants per square mile (80.5/km^{2}). There were 955 housing units at an average density of 100.5 per square mile (38.8/km^{2}). The racial makeup of the city was 72.2% White, 22.6% Black or African American, 0.8% Native American, 0.1% Asian, 2.6% from other races, and 1.7% from two or more races. 4.7% of the population were Hispanic or Latino of any race.

There were 816 households, out of which 25.6% had children under the age of 18 living with them, 45.2% were married couples living together, 19.4% had a female householder with no husband present, and 32.1% were non-families. 28.4% of all households were made up of individuals, and 12.8% had someone living alone who was 65 years of age or older. The average household size was 2.43 and the average family size was 2.94.

The median income for a household in the city was $32,212, and the median income for a family was $39,496. Males had a median income of $25,962 versus $21,250 for females. The per capita income for the city was $12,772. About 20.6% of families and 23.8% of the population were below the poverty line, including 32.1% of those under age 18 and 29.5% of those age 65 or over.

== Notable people ==
- Brad Baxter, former National Football League running back. Graduated from Slocomb High School.
- Tony Bowick, former NFL player for the Atlanta Falcons. Graduated from Slocomb High School.
- Clay Holmes, an American professional baseball pitcher for Major League Baseball's New York Mets.
