= Fishpond, Alabama =

Unincorporated community in Alabama, United States

- Unincorporated community
- Location within Alabama Location within the United States
- Coordinates: 32°52′04″N 86°01′24″W
- Country: United States
- State: Alabama
- County: Coosa
- Elevation: 748 ft (228 m)
- Time zone: UTC-6 (Central (CST))
  - Summer (DST): UTC-5 (CDT)
- Area codes: 256 & 938, 334
- GNIS feature ID: 156349

Fishpond is an unincorporated community in Coosa County, Alabama, United States.
