= Highnote, Alabama =

Unincorporated community in Alabama, United States

- Unincorporated community
- Location within Alabama Location within the United States
- Coordinates: 30°59′46″N 85°41′33″W
- Country: United States
- State: Alabama
- County: Geneva
- Elevation: 167 ft (51 m)
- Time zone: UTC-6 (Central (CST))
  - Summer (DST): UTC-5 (CDT)
- Area code: 334

Highnote is an unincorporated community in Geneva County, Alabama, United States.

== History ==
A post office called Highnote was established in 1896, and remained in operation until it was discontinued in 1909.
