= Eunola, Alabama =

- Census-designated place
- Location of Eunola in Geneva County, Alabama.
- Coordinates: 31°01′57″N 85°50′27″W
- Country: United States
- State: Alabama
- County: Geneva

Area
  - Total: 1.84 sq mi (4.77 km^{2})
  - Land: 1.83 sq mi (4.73 km^{2})
  - Water: 0.015 sq mi (0.04 km^{2})
- Elevation: 135 ft (41 m)

Population (2020)
  - Total: 284
  - Density: 155.6/sq mi (60.06/km^{2})
- Time zone: UTC-6 (Central (CST))
  - Summer (DST): UTC-5 (CDT)
- ZIP code: 36340
- Area code: 334
- FIPS code: 01-24616
- GNIS feature ID: 2633143

Eunola is a census-designated place and former town in Geneva County, Alabama, United States. It is part of the Dothan, Alabama Metropolitan Statistical Area. At the 2020 census, the population was 284. The town was disincorporated in 2007.

== History ==
Eunola was initially appeared on the 1900 U.S. Census as an incorporated community. It did not reappear on the census rolls until 1940. It was disincorporate by judicial order in 2007 due to its not having held elections in half a century and lacking the minimum of 300 residents required to reincorporate under Alabama state law. It was reclassified as a census-designated place in 2010.

The town suffered extensive damage from an EF2 tornado on January 25, 2026.

== Geography ==
According to the U.S. Census Bureau, the town has a total area of 1.8 square miles (4.7 km^{2}), of which 1.8 square miles (4.7 km^{2}) is land and 0.01 square miles (0.026 km^{2}) (0.76%) is water.

== Demographics ==
Historical population
Census	Pop.	Note	%±
1900	132		—
1940	113		—
1950	112		−0.9%
1960	124		10.7%
1970	141		13.7%
1980	169		19.9%
1990	199		17.8%
2000	182		−8.5%
2010	243		33.5%
2020	284		16.9%
U.S. Decennial Census; 2013 Estimate

After disincorporation, Eunola was listed as a census designated place in the 2010 U.S. census.

=== 2020 census ===
Eunola CDP, Alabama – Racial and ethnic composition Note: the US Census treats Hispanic/Latino as an ethnic category. This table excludes Latinos from the racial categories and assigns them to a separate category. Hispanics/Latinos may be of any race.
Race / Ethnicity (NH = Non-Hispanic)	Pop 2000	Pop 2010	Pop 2020	% 2000	% 2010	% 2020
White alone (NH)	162	218	250	89.01%	89.71%	88.03%
Black or African American alone (NH)	16	18	17	8.79%	7.41%	5.99%
Native American or Alaska Native alone (NH)	1	0	0	0.55%	0.00%	0.00%
Asian alone (NH)	0	1	0	0.00%	0.41%	0.00%
Native Hawaiian or Pacific Islander alone (NH)	0	0	0	0.00%	0.00%	0.00%
Other race alone (NH)	0	0	2	0.00%	0.00%	0.70%
Mixed race or Multiracial (NH)	2	2	5	1.10%	0.82%	1.76%
Hispanic or Latino (any race)	1	4	10	0.55%	1.65%	3.52%
Total	182	243	284	100.00%	100.00%	100.00%

=== 2000 census ===
As of the census of 2000, there were 182 people, 87 households, and 56 families residing in the town. The population density was 192.8 inhabitants per square mile (74.4/km^{2}). There were 97 housing units at an average density of 102.7 per square mile (39.7/km^{2}). The racial makeup of the town was 89.56% White, 8.79% Black or African American, 0.55% Native American, and 1.10% from two or more races. 0.55% of the population were Hispanic or Latino of any race.

There were 87 households, out of which 28.7% had children under the age of 18 living with them, 44.8% were married couples living together, 12.6% had a female householder with no husband present, and 35.6% were non-families. 34.5% of all households were made up of individuals, and 6.9% had someone living alone who was 65 years of age or older. The average household size was 2.09 and the average family size was 2.66.

In the town the population was spread out, with 20.9% under the age of 18, 9.9% from 18 to 24, 24.2% from 25 to 44, 30.8% from 45 to 64, and 14.3% who were 65 years of age or older. The median age was 43 years. For every 100 females, there were 109.2 males. For every 100 females age 18 and over, there were 97.3 males.

The median income for a household in the town was $26,250, and the median income for a family was $32,188. Males had a median income of $25,000 versus $16,250 for females. The per capita income for the town was $15,120. About 10.2% of families and 14.6% of the population were below the poverty line, including 16.0% of those under the age of eighteen and 15.8% of those 65 or over.

== Loss of Charter ==
The Town of Eunola lost its charter when a judge ruled in August 2007 that because it had not held elections since regaining its charter in 1957, it was not functioning as a town. Several days later, many Eunola residents signed a petition in hopes of reincorporating, and papers were filed in Geneva County Probate Court to start the process. Probate Judge Fred Hamic then asked for an Attorney General's opinion on whether the town could reincorporate.

In January 2008 the Attorney General ruled that Alabama law precludes a community with a population of less than 300 from being incorporated.

Attorneys for the town argued that Alabama law allowed a town that had become dormant to become reinstated by a petition of the majority of the taxpayers in that town. However, the AG opinion stated that Eunola had not become dormant, but had been dissolved. That means, in essence, the Town of Eunola never existed and would have to incorporate through the requirements of Alabama law, including the population provision. For almost 50 years, the mayor and town council positions were changed by word of mouth instead of elections. Longtime residents said they don't recall anyone questioning the fact that elections were never held.

The fact that Eunola had never held elections came to light after the Eunola Town Council attempted to enforce a 1988 zoning ordinance that would have kept a couple from placing mobile homes on their property for rent.

Attorney Jeffery D. Hatcher of Geneva, Alabama challenged the validity of the ordinance on the grounds that it was not properly adopted, and also that it was moot because the town had never held elections since being granted a charter in 1957. Eunola sued the property owners in an effort to enforce the ordinance. Another lawsuit arose from that action, resulting in the town losing its charter after it was proven no elections were held.

By law, all of Eunola's assets — some land and what is believed to be more than $100,000 — became the property of Geneva County.

It was later made into a Census Designated area at some point between 2007 and 2010 as it appeared on the 2010 census as a "CDP".

== Education ==
Eunola is in the Geneva City School District.
