= WFXO (AM) =

- Alexander City, Alabama; United States
- Frequency: 1050 kHz
- Branding: KiX 96.3

Programming
- Format: Country

Ownership
- Owner: Marble City Media LLC
- Sister stations: WAUE; WRFS; WSGN; WYEA

History
- First air date: 1947
- Former call signs: WRFS (1947–1986); WSTH (1986–1988); WDAK (1988–1990); WASY (1990); WXTH (1990–1992); WTLM (1992–1994); WRFS (1994–2008); WBNM (2008–2016); WLMA (2016–2019); WSGN (2019–2022)

Technical information
- Licensing authority: FCC
- Facility ID: 60762
- Class: D
- Power: 1,000 watts (day); 48 watts (night)
- Transmitter coordinates: 32°57′3″N 85°59′7″W
- Translator: 96.3 W242CP (Alexander City)

Links
- Public license information: Public file; LMS
- Website: www.kix963.com

WFXO (1050 AM) is a radio station licensed to serve Alexander City, Alabama, United States. The station is owned by Marble City Media LLC and simulcasts on FM translator W242CP (96.3). It is branded as "KiX 96.3", with a country format.

== History ==
In August 2004, Casey Network LLC (Jimmy Jarrell, president/CEO) reached an agreement to sell this station, then known as WRFS, to Joy Christian Communications Inc. (Ed L. Smith, president) for a reported sale price of $175,000. At the time of the sale, the station broadcast an adult contemporary music format.

Former sports radio logo

In January 2007, Joy Christian Communications Inc. (Ed Smith, president) reached an agreement to sell this station to Racquel Humphrey for a reported sale price of $230,000. At the time of the sale, the station broadcast a Southern Gospel music format.

The station was assigned the WBNM call letters by the Federal Communications Commission on May 15, 2008.

In 2008, WBNM became an official ESPN Radio affiliate while keeping Southern Gospel music programming on Sunday mornings.

In 2010, WBNM decided to switch from ESPN Radio to The True Oldies Channel from Citadel Media.

In the spring of 2012, WBNM switched to Citadel's (now part of Cumulus Media) Real Country format, and then in the fall of 2012, the former "Solid Gospel" format of WJHO began broadcasting on WBNM and its new FM translator at 99.1.

On December 23, 2015, immediately following a sale to Westburg Broadcasting Montgomery LLC, the station was operated by Marble City Media LLC and simulcast its WRFS in Rockford. On February 18, 2016, ownership transferred to Marble City Media LLC (at a purchase price of $10,000), and the call sign was changed to WLMA. New translator W242CP on 96.3 MHz was added in March 2016, with a format change to classic country on March 26.

Marble City Media LLC owns and operates stations primarily serving Sylacauga-Childersburg, Alexander City-Dadeville-Lake Martin-Wetumpka-Montgomery, and Auburn-Opelika.

On May 25, 2018, WLMA rebranded as "KiX 96.3"

On February 13, 2019, the station changed its call sign to WSGN.

On July 27, 2022, Marble City Media announced that the WSGN call sign would move to WFXO (98.3 FM) on July 31, the WFXO call sign would in turn move to 1050.
