= Samson, Alabama =

City in Alabama, United States

Samson
- City
- Location of Samson in Geneva County, Alabama.
- Coordinates: 31°07′12″N 86°02′51″W
- Country: United States
- State: Alabama
- County: Geneva

Area
  - Total: 3.63 sq mi (9.40 km^{2})
  - Land: 3.62 sq mi (9.37 km^{2})
  - Water: 0.0077 sq mi (0.02 km^{2})
- Elevation: 210 ft (64 m)

Population (2020)
  - Total: 1,874
  - Density: 517.9/sq mi (199.98/km^{2})
- Time zone: UTC-6 (Central (CST))
  - Summer (DST): UTC-5 (CDT)
- ZIP code: 36477
- Area code: 334
- FIPS code: 01-67800
- GNIS feature ID: 2405412
- Website: www.cityofsamson.com

Samson is a city in Geneva County, Alabama, United States. It is part of the Dothan, Alabama Metropolitan Statistical Area. At the 2020 census, the population was 1,874, a decline from the figure of 1,940 tabulated in 2010. Samson incorporated in 1905 (according to the 1910 U.S. Census), although other sources cited 1906.

The town's current motto is "Samson...We Grow Friendly People." A Samson High School student devised the slogan during a high school contest. This contest received more than 50 entries, and the student emerged as the winner, earning $100. The contest committee deemed his slogan, "Samson-we grow friendly people," as a representation of the agricultural aspect and the amicability of the town.

== History ==
During the Great Depression, the T.S. Faulk and Company Store in downtown Samson purchased a large shipment of snuff, which remained stationary at the town's depot for an extended period of time. This led to Samson being nicknamed "Snuff City, U.S.A." The nickname is commemorated today with a New Year's drop of a Rooster snuff can.

In an attempt to shed this moniker, several community groups decided to plant extensive beds of red roses along all the roads leading into Samson. With this planting, they hoped the new slogan "City of a Million Roses" would take root. However, as the roses gradually disappeared, the old slogan resurfaced.

=== 2009 shooting spree ===
On March 10, 2009, in the Alabama towns of Kinston, Samson and Geneva, the deadliest mass shooting in the state's history took place in Geneva County. Twenty-eight-year-old Michael McLendon began this massacre by killing his mother and burning down her house in Kinston. He then headed east about 10 miles on Highway 52 and went on an hour-long shooting spree with two high-powered weapons in downtown Samson and a few of its neighborhoods. McLendon then headed to Geneva. McLendon killed ten people and wounded six others in the shooting rampage before committing suicide.

Reportedly, McLendon had talked to a confidant about being depressed and frustrated with his inability to become a Marine or a police officer.

== Geography ==
According to the U.S. Census Bureau, the city has a total area of 3.6 square miles (9.3 km^{2}), of which 3.6 square miles (9.3 km^{2}) is land and 0.28% is water.

== Demographics ==
Historical population
Census	Pop.	Note	%±
1910	1,350		—
1920	1,646		21.9%
1930	1,656		0.6%
1940	2,182		31.8%
1950	2,204		1.0%
1960	1,932		−12.3%
1970	2,257		16.8%
1980	2,402		6.4%
1990	2,190		−8.8%
2000	2,071		−5.4%
2010	1,940		−6.3%
2020	1,874		−3.4%
U.S. Decennial Census; 2013 Estimate

=== 2020 census ===
As of the 2020 census, Samson had a population of 1,874. The median age was 37.2 years. 27.7% of residents were under the age of 18 and 17.8% of residents were 65 years of age or older. For every 100 females there were 93.2 males, and for every 100 females age 18 and over there were 86.4 males age 18 and over.

0.0% of residents lived in urban areas, while 100.0% lived in rural areas.

There were 734 households in Samson, of which 32.3% had children under the age of 18 living in them. Of all households, 34.2% were married-couple households, 19.5% were households with a male householder and no spouse or partner present, and 40.7% were households with a female householder and no spouse or partner present. About 33.2% of all households were made up of individuals and 17.3% had someone living alone who was 65 years of age or older.

There were 880 housing units, of which 16.6% were vacant. The homeowner vacancy rate was 1.8% and the rental vacancy rate was 9.2%.

Samson racial composition
Race	Num.	Perc.
White (non-Hispanic)	1,236	65.96%
Black or African American (non-Hispanic)	300	16.01%
Native American	16	0.85%
Asian	4	0.21%
Other/Mixed	85	4.54%
Hispanic or Latino	233	12.43%

=== 2010 census ===
At the 2010 census there were 1,940 people, 814 households, and 513 families living in the city. The population density was 538.9 inhabitants per square mile (208.1/km^{2}). There were 968 housing units at an average density of 268.9 per square mile (103.8/km^{2}). The racial makeup of the city was 73.3% White, 17.9% Black or African American, 1.1% Native American, 5.2% from other races, and 2.1% from two or more races. 8.3% of the population were Hispanic or Latino of any race. Of the 814 households 25.6% had children under the age of 18 living with them, 36.2% were married couples living together, 20.1% had a female householder with no husband present, and 37.0% were non-families. 32.3% of households were one person and 13.6% were one person aged 65 or older. The average household size was 2.38 and the average family size was 3.05.

The age distribution was 24.6% under the age of 18, 8.6% from 18 to 24, 24.8% from 25 to 44, 25.6% from 45 to 64, and 16.4% 65 or older. The median age was 38.1 years. For every 100 females, there were 90.0 males. For every 100 females age 18 and over, there were 90.7 males.

The median household income was $18,768 and the median family income was $25,060. Males had a median income of $29,167 versus $19,682 for females. The per capita income for the city was $11,606. About 31.6% of families and 32.5% of the population were below the poverty line, including 44.7% of those under age 18 and 19.4% of those age 65 or over.

=== 2000 census ===
At the 2000 census there were 2,071 people, 894 households, and 575 families living in the city. The population density was 572.1 inhabitants per square mile (220.9/km^{2}). There were 1,016 housing units at an average density of 280.7 per square mile (108.4/km^{2}). The racial makeup of the city was 77.11% White, 20.42% Black or African American, 0.97% Native American, 0.63% from other races, and 0.87% from two or more races. 2.46% of the population were Hispanic or Latino of any race. Of the 894 households 28.6% had children under the age of 18 living with them, 44.4% were married couples living together, 16.8% had a female householder with no husband present, and 35.6% were non-families. 33.3% of households were one person and 16.1% were one person aged 65 or older. The average household size was 2.32 and the average family size was 2.92.

The age distribution was 25.5% under the age of 18, 7.5% from 18 to 24, 24.8% from 25 to 44, 24.3% from 45 to 64, and 17.9% 65 or older. The median age was 38 years. For every 100 females, there were 86.9 males. For every 100 females age 18 and over, there were 80.5 males.

The median household income was $18,594 and the median family income was $25,188. Males had a median income of $25,767 versus $16,719 for females. The per capita income for the city was $12,834. About 29.2% of families and 33.8% of the population were below the poverty line, including 51.1% of those under age 18 and 32.0% of those age 65 or over.

== Notable people ==
- Roy Brooks — guitarist, lived in Samson from 1971 to 1983
- Terry Owens — football player, San Diego Chargers; graduated from Samson High School in 1962
- James "J.T." Thomas Jr. — winner of Survivor: Tocantins
- Bill Yates — cartoonist, born in Samson
