= List of census-designated places in Alabama =

Map of the United States with Alabama highlighted

Census-designated places (CDPs) are unincorporated communities lacking elected municipal officers and boundaries with legal status. In 2024, there were 130 census-designated places in Alabama.

Place Name	County(ies)^{[A]}	Location of County	Population (2020)	Population (2010)	Population (2000)	Population (1990)	Population (1980)	Notes / 1970 / 1960	Land Area (2020)	Density (2020)
Abanda	Chambers		133	192	x	x	x		3.00 sq mi (7.76 km^{2})	44.4/sq mi (17.1/km^{2})
Alexandria	Calhoun		4,032	3,917	3,692	x	x		11.14 sq mi (28.84 km^{2})	362.1/sq mi (139.8/km^{2})
Axis	Mobile		561	757	x	x	x		3.50 sq mi (9.05 km^{2})	160.5/sq mi (62.0/km^{2})
Ballplay	Etowah		1,437	1,580	x	x	x		23.55 sq mi (61.00 km^{2})	61.0/sq mi (23.6/km^{2})
Belgreen	Franklin		170	129	x	x	x		1.23 sq mi (3.18 km^{2})	138.4/sq mi (53.5/km^{2})
Bellamy	Sumter		363	543	x	x	x		3.78 sq mi (9.78 km^{2})	96.1/sq mi (37.1/km^{2})
Belle Fontaine	Mobile		613	608	x	x	x		1.55 sq mi (4.02 km^{2})	394.7/sq mi (152.4/km^{2})
Blue Ridge	Elmore		1,485	1,341	1,331	1,151	x		7.76 sq mi (20.09 km^{2})	191.4/sq mi (73.9/km^{2})
Bon Secour	Baldwin		1,754	x	x	x	x		4.32 sq mi (11.19 km^{2})	405.9/sq mi (156.7/km^{2})
Boykin	Wilcox		208	275	x	x	x		2.80 sq mi (7.24 km^{2})	74.4/sq mi (28.7/km^{2})
Brantleyville	Shelby		931	884	x	x	x		2.20 sq mi (5.69 km^{2})	424.0/sq mi (163.7/km^{2})
Bristow Cove	Etowah		624	683	x	x	x		10.84 sq mi (28.08 km^{2})	57.5/sq mi (22.2/km^{2})
Brook Highland	Shelby		7,406	6,746	5,799	1,840	x	The name was changed from Lake Purdy to Brook Highland for the 2010 U.S. census.	2.78 sq mi (7.21 km^{2})	2,660.2/sq mi (1,027.1/km^{2})
Broomtown	Cherokee		160	182	x	x	x		4.69 sq mi (12.16 km^{2})	34.1/sq mi (13.2/km^{2})
Bucks	Mobile		22	32	x	x	x		0.39 sq mi (1.00 km^{2})	56.8/sq mi (21.9/km^{2})
Calvert	Mobile; Washington		255	277	x	x	x		2.34 sq mi (6.06 km^{2})	109.1/sq mi (42.1/km^{2})
Carlisle-Rockledge	Etowah		2,167	2,137	x	x	x		16.20 sq mi (41.96 km^{2})	133.8/sq mi (51.6/km^{2})
Carlton	Clarke		46	65	x	x	x		4.52 sq mi (11.71 km^{2})	10.2/sq mi (3.9/km^{2})
Catherine	Wilcox		65	22	x	x	x		2.30 sq mi (5.94 km^{2})	28.3/sq mi (10.9/km^{2})
Choccolocco	Calhoun		2,838	2,804	x	x	x		11.65 sq mi (30.16 km^{2})	243.7/sq mi (94.1/km^{2})
Chunchula	Mobile		195	210	x	x	x		1.80 sq mi (4.67 km^{2})	108.1/sq mi (41.7/km^{2})
Coats Bend	Etowah		1,318	1,394	x	x	x		8.55 sq mi (22.14 km^{2})	154.2/sq mi (59.5/km^{2})
Concord	Jefferson		1,690	1,837	1,809	x	x		3.37 sq mi (8.72 km^{2})	502.2/sq mi (193.9/km^{2})
Cottondale	Tuscaloosa		3,130	x	x	x	x		3.44 sq mi (8.92 km^{2})	908.8/sq mi (350.9/km^{2})
Cullomburg	Choctaw; Washington		126	171	x	x	x		5.35 sq mi (13.84 km^{2})	23.6/sq mi (9.1/km^{2})
Deer Park	Washington		141	188	x	x	x		3.13 sq mi (8.09 km^{2})	45.1/sq mi (17.4/km^{2})
Delta	Clay		260	197	x	x	x		7.79 sq mi (20.17 km^{2})	33.4/sq mi (12.9/km^{2})
Dunnavant	Shelby		936	981	x	x	x		19.26 sq mi (49.87 km^{2})	48.6/sq mi (18.8/km^{2})
Eagle Point	Shelby		2,903	x	x	x	x		2.21 sq mi (5.72 km^{2})	1,313.6/sq mi (507.2/km^{2})
East Point	Cullman		172	201	x	x	x		0.98 sq mi (2.53 km^{2})	176.4/sq mi (68.1/km^{2})
Edgewater	Jefferson		746	883	730	x	x	Listed in the 1950 U.S. Census as an unincorporated community (pop 1,984)	1.16 sq mi (3.00 km^{2})	643.1/sq mi (248.3/km^{2})
Egypt	Etowah		845	932	x	x	x		9.01 sq mi (23.34 km^{2})	93.8/sq mi (36.2/km^{2})
Emerald Mountain	Elmore		3,310	2,561	x	x	x		16.09 sq mi (41.67 km^{2})	205.7/sq mi (79.4/km^{2})
Equality	Coosa		150	x	x	x	x		5.25 sq mi (13.61 km^{2})	28.6/sq mi (11.0/km^{2})
Eunola	Geneva		284	243	182	199	169	Incorporated as a town since 1940. Disincorporated in 2007 and redesignated as a CDP.	1.83 sq mi (4.73 km^{2})	155.5/sq mi (60.1/km^{2})
Fairford	Washington		161	186	x	x	x		3.07 sq mi (7.95 km^{2})	52.4/sq mi (20.2/km^{2})
Fayetteville	Talladega		1,422	1,284	x	x	x		17.44 sq mi (45.18 km^{2})	81.5/sq mi (31.5/km^{2})
Fitzpatrick	Bullock		79	83	x	x	x		4.16 sq mi (10.78 km^{2})	19.0/sq mi (7.3/km^{2})
Forestdale	Jefferson		10,409	10,162	10,509	10,814	6,091		6.75 sq mi (17.47 km^{2})	1,542.8/sq mi (595.7/km^{2})
Fort Rucker	Dale		4,464	4,636	6,052	7,593	8,932	Listed as an unincorporated place in the 1970 U.S. census (pop. 14,242).	10.86 sq mi (28.14 km^{2})	410.9/sq mi (164.5/km^{2})
Fredonia	Chambers		198	199	x	x	x		11.98 sq mi (31.03 km^{2})	16.5/sq mi (6.4/km^{2})
Fruitdale	Washington		175	185	x	x	x		4.47 sq mi (11.59 km^{2})	39.1/sq mi (15.1/km^{2})
Gallant	Etowah		869	855	x	x	x		14.38 sq mi (37.25 km^{2})	60.4/sq mi (23.3/km^{2})
Graham	Randolph		196	211	x	x	x		5.85 sq mi (15.16 km^{2})	33.5/sq mi (12.9/km^{2})
Grand Bay	Mobile		3,460	3,672	3,918				8.68 sq mi (22.47 km^{2})	398.8/sq mi (154.0/km^{2})
Grayson Valley	Jefferson		5,982	5,736	5,447	x	x		1.91 sq mi (4.95 km^{2})	3,130.3/sq mi (1,208.6/km^{2})
Gulfcrest	Mobile		142	161	x	x	x		1.51 sq mi (3.92 km^{2})	93.8/sq mi (36.2/km^{2})
Hackneyville	Tallapoosa		349	347	x	x	x		8.96 sq mi (23.21 km^{2})	38.9/sq mi (15.0/km^{2})
Hanover	Coosa		151	x	x	x	x		4.21 sq mi (10.91 km^{2})	35.8/sq mi (13.8/km^{2})
Harvest	Madison		5,893	5,281	3,054	1,922	x		12.33 sq mi (31.94 km^{2})	477.8/sq mi (184.5/km^{2})
Hatton	Lawrence		244	261	x	x	x		1.33 sq mi (3.45 km^{2})	183.0/sq mi (70.7/km^{2})
Hazel Green	Madison		4,105	3,630	3,805				10.03 sq mi (25.99 km^{2})	409.1/sq mi (158.0/km^{2})
Highland Lakes	Shelby		5,239	3,926	x	x	x		3.82 sq mi (9.88 km^{2})	1,372.9/sq mi (530.1/km^{2})
Hissop	Coosa		209	658	x	x	x		10.93 sq mi (28.30 km^{2})	19.1/sq mi (7.4/km^{2})
Hobson	Washington		100	126	x	x	x		2.94 sq mi (7.62 km^{2})	34.0/sq mi (13.1/km^{2})
Hollins	Clay		517	545	x	x	x		11.85 sq mi (30.68 km^{2})	43.6/sq mi (16.9/km^{2})
Hollis Crossroads	Cleburne		665	608	x	x	x		12.46 sq mi (32.26 km^{2})	53.4/sq mi (20.6/km^{2})
Holt	Tuscaloosa		3,413	3,638	4,103	4,125	x	First appeared in 1950 U.S. Census as the unincorporated community of Holt-Fox Pop 2,453). Not relisted until 1990.	3.16 sq mi (8.19 km^{2})	1,078.7/sq mi (416.5/km^{2})
Holtville	Elmore		4,940	4,096	x	x	x		21.59 sq mi (55.91 km^{2})	228.9/sq mi (88.4/km^{2})
Huguley	Chambers		2,470	2,540	2,953				8.27 sq mi (21.42 km^{2})	298.6/sq mi (115.3/km^{2})
Ivalee	Etowah		946	879	x	x	x		7.45 sq mi (19.30 km^{2})	126.9/sq mi (49.0/km^{2})
Joppa	Cullman; Marshall		556	501	x	x	x		1.94 sq mi (5.03 km^{2})	286.0/sq mi (110.4/km^{2})
Ladonia	Russell		3,074	3,142	3,229				3.13 sq mi (8.10 km^{2})	982.4/sq mi (379.3/km^{2})
Leroy	Washington		766	911	x	x	x		11.91 sq mi (30.85 km^{2})	64.3/sq mi (24.8/km^{2})
Lillian	Baldwin		1,330	x	x	x	x		1.91 sq mi (4.94 km^{2})	696.7/sq mi (269.0/km^{2})
Lookout Mountain	Etowah		1,484	1,621	x	x	x		15.23 sq mi (39.45 km^{2})	97.4/sq mi (37.6/km^{2})
Macedonia	Pickens		241	292	291	x	x		3.95 sq mi (10.23 km^{2})	61.0/sq mi (23.6/km^{2})
Malcolm	Washington		136	187	x	x	x		2.37 sq mi (6.13 km^{2})	57.5/sq mi (22.2/km^{2})
Marbury	Autauga		1,427	1,418	x	x	x		23.15 sq mi (59.97 km^{2})	61.6/sq mi (23.8/km^{2})
McCalla	Jefferson; Tuscaloosa		12,965	x	x	x	x		33.79 sq mi (87.53 km^{2})	383.6/sq mi (148.1/km^{2})
McDonald Chapel	Jefferson		739	717	1,054	x	x	x	1.06 sq mi (2.76 km^{2})	694.5/sq mi (268.2/km^{2})
Meadowbrook	Shelby		9,688	8,769	4,697				4.36 sq mi (11.29 km^{2})	2,222.5/sq mi (858.1/km^{2})
Megargel	Monroe		60	62	x	x	x		0.69 sq mi (1.78 km^{2})	87.2/sq mi (33.7/km^{2})
Meridianville	Madison		8,209	6,021	4,117				15.56 sq mi (40.29 km^{2})	527.7/sq mi (203.75/km^{2})
Mignon	Talladega		1,186	1,284	1,348				2.00 sq mi (5.19 km^{2})	592.4/sq mi (228.7/km^{2})
Millerville	Clay		303	278	x	x	x		6.70 sq mi (17.35 km^{2})	45.2/sq mi (17.5/km^{2})
Minor	Jefferson		1,088	1,094	1,116				0.66 sq mi (1.72 km^{2})	1,638.6/sq mi (632.6/km^{2})
Moores Mill	Madison		6,729	5,682	5,178				13.61 sq mi (35.24 km^{2})	494.6/sq mi (191.0/km^{2})
Morrison Crossroads	Randolph		221	219	x	x	x		5.19 sq mi (13.44 km^{2})	42.6/sq mi (16.4/km^{2})
Mount Olive	Coosa		311	371	x	x	x		8.32 sq mi (21.55 km^{2})	37.4/sq mi (14.4/km^{2})
Mount Olive	Jefferson		4,427	4,079	3,957	x	x		9.30 sq mi (24.08 km^{2})	476.2/sq mi (183.9/km^{2})
Movico	Mobile		291	305	x	x	x		0.78 sq mi (2.03 km^{2})	371.6/sq mi (143.5/km^{2})
Nanafalia	Marengo		75	94	x	x	x		2.17 sq mi (5.62 km^{2})	34.6/sq mi (13.3/km^{2})
Nances Creek	Calhoun		399	407	x	x	x		5.81 sq mi (15.04 km^{2})	68.7/sq mi (26.5/km^{2})
New Market	Madison		1,543	1,597	1,864				17.53 sq mi (45.40 km^{2})	88.0/sq mi (34.0/km^{2})
New Union	Etowah		1,019	955	x	x	x		12.18 sq mi (31.56 km^{2})	83.6/sq mi (32.3/km^{2})
Nixburg	Coosa		329	x	x	x	x		7.46 sq mi (19.33 km^{2})	44.1/sq mi (17.0/km^{2})
Our Town	Tallapoosa		605	641	x	x	x		11.85 sq mi (30.70 km^{2})	51.0/sq mi (19.7/km^{2})
Panola	Sumter		71	144	x	x	x		0.72 sq mi (1.86 km^{2})	98.9/sq mi (38.2/km^{2})
Pea Ridge	Shelby		841	x	x	x	x		15.64 sq mi (40.52 km^{2})	53.8/sq mi (20.8/km^{2})
Penton	Chambers		163	201	x	x	x		9.14 sq mi (23.66 km^{2})	17.8/sq mi (6.9/km^{2})
Perdido	Baldwin		730	x	x	x	x		11.14 sq mi (28.85 km^{2})	65.5/sq mi (25.3/km^{2})
Peterman	Monroe		87	89	x	x	x		0.42 sq mi (1.10 km^{2})	205.7/sq mi (79.4/km^{2})
Point Clear	Baldwin		2,076	2,125	1,876	2,125	1,812		4.59 sq mi (11.89 km^{2})	452.1/sq mi (174.6/km^{2})
Putnam	Marengo		172	193	x	x	x		9.49 sq mi (24.57 km^{2})	18.1/sq mi (7.0/km^{2})
Ray	Coosa		326	443	x	x	x		9.46 sq mi (24.51 km^{2})	34.5/sq mi (13.3/km^{2})
Redland	Elmore		5,106	3,736	x	x	x		24.13 sq mi (62.49 km^{2})	211.6/sq mi (81.7/km^{2})
Redstone Arsenal	Madison		837	1,946	2,365	4,909	5,728		21.81 sq mi (56.49 km^{2})	38.4/sq mi (14.8/km^{2})
Reeltown	Tallapoosa		794	766	x	x	x		7.55 sq mi (19.55 km^{2})	105.2/sq mi (40.6/km^{2})
Remlap	Blount		2,624	x	x	x	x		16.27 sq mi (42.14 km^{2})	161.3/sq mi (62.3/km^{2})
Rock Creek	Jefferson		1,471	1,456	1,495	x	x		3.02 sq mi (7.81 km^{2})	487.7/sq mi (188.3/km^{2})
Rock Mills	Randolph		603	600	676	x	x		6.33 sq mi (16.38 km^{2})	95.3/sq mi (36.8/km^{2})
Rockville	Clarke		47	43	x	x	x		2.81 sq mi (7.27 km^{2})	16.7/sq mi (6.5/km^{2})
St. Stephens	Washington		495	415	x	x	x		9.88 sq mi (25.58 km^{2})	42.0/sq mi (16.2/km^{2})
Saks	Calhoun		9,956	10,744	10,698	11,138	11,118	Listed in the 1970 U.S. Census as the unincorporated place of Anniston Northwest (pop 6,609). The name was changed to Saks for the 1980 U.S. census.	12.18 sq mi (31.54 km^{2})	817.6/sq mi (315.7/km^{2})
Selmont-West Selmont	Dallas		2,158	2,671					3.28 sq mi (8.49 km^{2})	658.3/sq mi (254.2/km^{2})
Shelby	Shelby		940	1,044	x	x	x		18.76 sq mi (48.59 km^{2})	50.1/sq mi (19.3/km^{2})
Shoal Creek	Shelby		1,668	1,400	x	x	x		5.04 sq mi (13.06 km^{2})	330.9/sq mi (127.8/km^{2})
Sims Chapel	Washington		145	153	x	x	x		5.70 sq mi (14.77 km^{2})	25.4/sq mi (9.8/km^{2})
Smoke Rise	Blount		1,661	1,825					5.80 sq mi (15.03 km^{2})	286.2/sq mi (110.5/km^{2})
Spring Garden	Cherokee		216	238	x	x	x		2.27 sq mi (5.87 km^{2})	95.4/sq mi (36.8/km^{2})
Spruce Pine	Franklin		215	222	x	x	x		0.93 sq mi (2.40 km^{2})	231.7/sq mi (89.5/km^{2})
Standing Rock	Chambers		132	168	x	x	x		3.19 sq mi (8.26 km^{2})	41.4/sq mi (16.0/km^{2})
Stapleton	Baldwin		2,213	x	x	x	x		10.91 sq mi (28.27 km^{2})	202.8/sq mi (78.3/km^{2})
Sterrett	Shelby		706	712	x	x	x		22.92 sq mi (59.37 km^{2})	30.8/sq mi (11.9/km^{2})
Stewartville	Coosa		1,662	1,767	x	x	x		24.14 sq mi (62.52 km^{2})	68.8/sq mi (26.6/km^{2})
Stockton	Baldwin		557	x	x	x	x		9.34 sq mi (24.20 km^{2})	59.6/sq mi (23.0/km^{2})
Theodore	Mobile		6,270	6,130	6,811	6,509	6,392		7.98 sq mi (20.67 km^{2})	785.5/sq mi (303.3/km^{2})
Tibbie	Washington		55	41	x	x	x		1.75 sq mi (4.53 km^{2})	31.4/sq mi (12.1/km^{2})
Tidmore Bend	Etowah		1,119	1,245	x	x	x		9.62 sq mi (24.90 km^{2})	116.4/sq mi (44.9/km^{2})
Tillmans Corner	Mobile		17,731	17,398					12.99 sq mi (33.65 km^{2})	1,364.9/sq mi (527.0/km^{2})
Underwood-Petersville	Lauderdale		3,051	3,247					5.80 sq mi (15.01 km^{2})	526.4/sq mi (203.2/km^{2})
Uriah	Monroe		263	294	x	x	x		1.61 sq mi (4.16 km^{2})	163.8/sq mi (63.2/km^{2})
Vandiver	Shelby		1,084	1,135	x	x	x		20.31 sq mi (52.60 km^{2})	53.4/sq mi (20.6/km^{2})
Vinegar Bend	Washington		178	192	x	x	x		9.45 sq mi (24.48 km^{2})	18.8/sq mi (7.3/km^{2})
Weogufka	Coosa		207	282	x	x	x		5.13 sq mi (13.28 km^{2})	40.4/sq mi (15.6/km^{2})
West End-Cobb Town	Calhoun		3,128	3,465					4.12 sq mi (10.67 km^{2})	759.2/sq mi (293.1/km^{2})
Whatley	Clarke		167	150	x	x	x		1.29 sq mi (3.34 km^{2})	129.4/sq mi (49.9/km^{2})
White Plains	Calhoun		877	811	x	x	x		12.79 sq mi (33.13 km^{2})	68.6/sq mi (26.5/km^{2})
Whitesboro	Etowah		2,113	2,138	x	x	x		17.48 sq mi (45.27 km^{2})	120.9/sq mi (46.7/km^{2})

== Former census-designated places ==
Place Name	County(ies)^{[A]}	Location of County	Population (2020)	Population (2010)	Population (2000)	Population (1990)	Population (1980)	Notes
Chalkville	Jefferson		x	x	3,829	x	x	Incorporated into the city of Clay
Clay	Jefferson		x	x	4,947	x	x	Incorporated into the city of Clay
Pinson	Jefferson		x	x	5,033	x	x	Incorporated into the city of Pinson
Eulaton	Calhoun		x	x	x	x	1,869	Deleted prior to 1990 U.S. Census
Fort McClellan	Calhoun		x	x	x		x	Annexed to the city of Anniston
Pine Level	Autauga		4,885	4,183	x	x	x	Incorporated as a town in December 2023
Vinette	Calhoun		x	x	x	x	1,809	Deleted prior to 1990 U.S. Census
Fairfax	Chambers		x	x	x	x		Incorporated into the city of Valley
Langdale	Chambers		x	x	x	x		Incorporated into the city of Valley
River View	Chambers		x	x	x	x		Incorporated into the city of Valley
Shawmut	Chambers		x	x	x	x		Incorporated into the city of Valley
Little Shawmut	Calhoun		x	x	x	x		Deleted prior to 1990 U.S. Census
Robinson Springs	Elmore		x	x	x	x		Annexed to the city of Millbrook
Lake Forest	Baldwin		x	x	x	x	3,489	Annexed to the city of Daphne
Pinson-Clay-Chalkville	Jefferson		x	x	x	10,987	x	Split into Chalkville, Clay, Grayson Valley, and Pinson CDPs prior to the 2000 U.S. Census
Munford	Talladega		x	x	2,446	x	x	Incorporated into the city of Munford in 2003
Inverness	Shelby		x	x	x			Annexed into the city of Hoover
Cahaba Heights	Jefferson		x	x			x	Annexed into the cities of Mountain Brook and Vestavia Hills
Chelsea	Shelby		x	x	x	1,329	x	Incorporated prior to the 2000 U.S. census
Fairfax	Chambers		x	x	x	x	3,776	Incorporated as the city of Valley prior to the 1990 U.S. census
Fort McClellan	Calhoun		x	x	x	7,561	4,128	Deleted prior to the 2000 U.S. census

== See also ==
- List of census-designated places
- List of cities and towns in Alabama
- List of unincorporated communities in Alabama
