= Anderson, Etowah County, Alabama =

Unincorporated community in Alabama, United States

Anderson, Alabama Anderson Crossroad, Anderson Crossing
- Unincorporated community
- Location within Alabama Location within the United States
- Coordinates: 34°04′16″N 85°55′17″W
- Country: United States
- State: Alabama
- County: Etowah
- Elevation: 564 ft (172 m)
- Time zone: UTC-6 (Central (CST))
  - Summer (DST): UTC-5 (CDT)
- Area codes: 256 & 938
- GNIS feature ID: 113067

Anderson, also known as Anderson Crossroad or Anderson Crossing, is an unincorporated community in Etowah County, Alabama, United States, located 2 miles (3.2 km) northeast of Gadsden on U.S. Route 411. Although its boundaries aren't explicitly defined, as of 2010, it is located partly within the CDP (census-designated place) of Tidmore Bend near the northeastern boundary of the adjacent CDP of Coats Bend.

== Demographics ==
According to the returns from 1850-2010 for Alabama, it has never reported a population figure separately on the U.S. Census.
