= Ridgeville, Alabama =

- Town
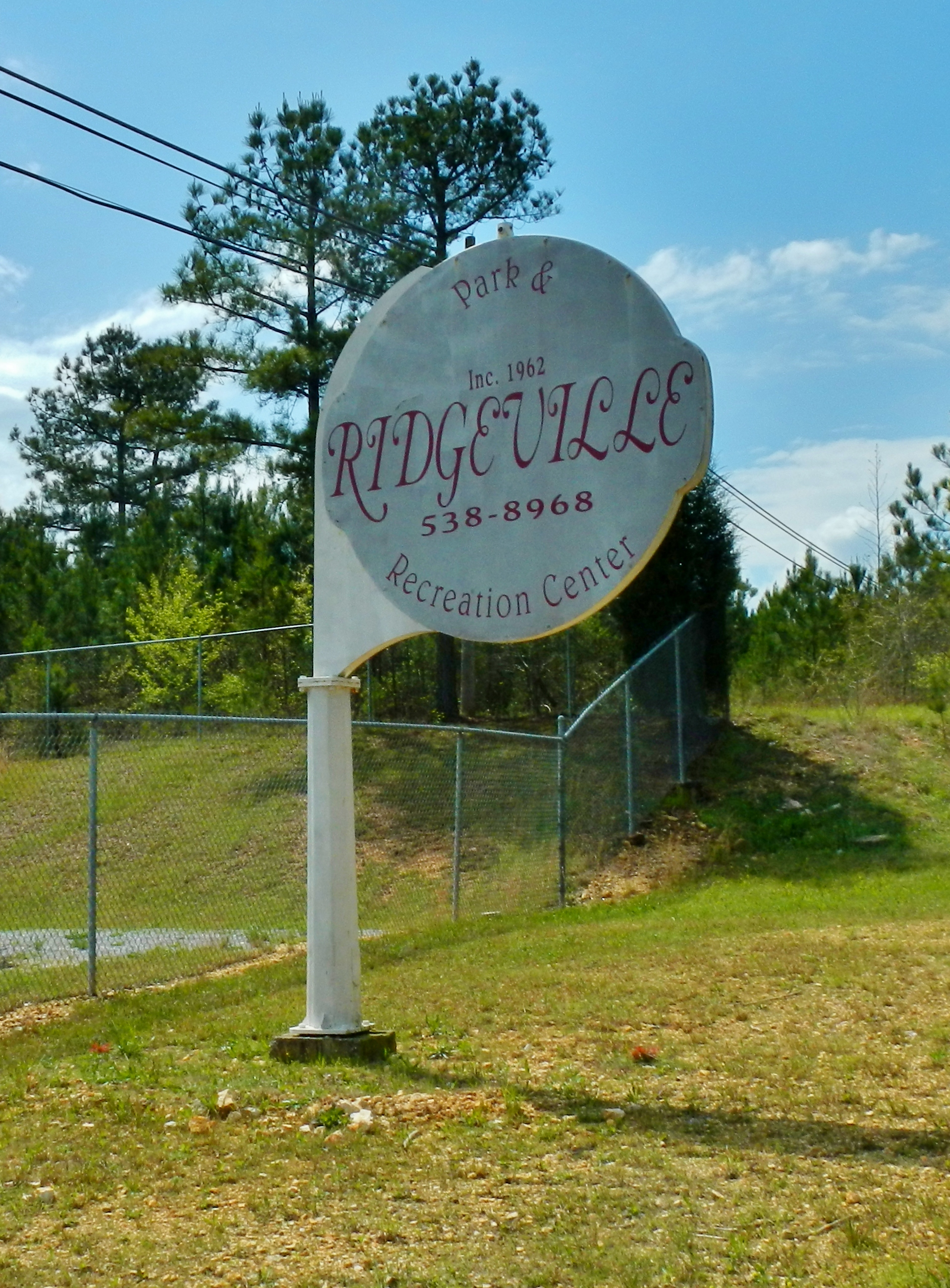
- Ridgeville in 2012

- Location of Ridgeville in Etowah County, Alabama.
- Coordinates: 34°03′25″N 86°06′10″W
- Country: United States
- State: Alabama
- County: Etowah

Area
  - Total: 0.82 sq mi (2.13 km^{2})
  - Land: 0.82 sq mi (2.13 km^{2})
  - Water: 0 sq mi (0.00 km^{2})
- Elevation: 676 ft (206 m)

Population (2020)
  - Total: 83
  - Density: 101.1/sq mi (39.05/km^{2})
- Time zone: UTC-6 (Central (CST))
  - Summer (DST): UTC-5 (CDT)
- ZIP code: 35954
- Area code: 256
- FIPS code: 01-64656
- GNIS feature ID: 2407216

Ridgeville is a town in Etowah County, Alabama, United States. It incorporated in 1969 and is part of the Gadsden Metropolitan Statistical Area. At the 2020 census the population was 83, down from 158 in 2000. It is noteworthy for being the only community in Etowah County to have a black majority. Since 1970, it has also been the least populated community wholly within the county.

== Geography ==
Ridgeville is located in central Etowah County 9 miles (14 km) by road northwest of Gadsden, the county seat.

According to the U.S. Census Bureau, the town has a total area of 0.81 square miles (2.1 km^{2}), all land.

== Demographics ==
Historical population
Census	Pop.	Note	%±
1970	177		—
1980	182		2.8%
1990	178		−2.2%
2000	158		−11.2%
2010	112		−29.1%
2020	83		−25.9%
2010 2020

=== 2020 Census ===
Ridgeville town, Alabama – Racial and ethnic composition Note: the US Census treats Hispanic/Latino as an ethnic category. This table excludes Latinos from the racial categories and assigns them to a separate category. Hispanics/Latinos may be of any race.
Race / Ethnicity (NH = Non-Hispanic)	Pop 2010	Pop 2020	% 2010	% 2020
White alone (NH)	36	19	32.14%	22.89%
Black or African American alone (NH)	64	49	57.14%	59.04%
Native American or Alaska Native alone (NH)	0	0	0.00%	0.00%
Asian alone (NH)	2	0	1.79%	0.00%
Pacific Islander alone (NH)	0	0	0.00%	0.00%
Some Other Race alone (NH)	0	3	0.00%	3.61%
Mixed Race or Multi-Racial (NH)	3	2	2.68%	2.41%
Hispanic or Latino (any race)	7	10	6.25%	12.05%
Total	112	83	100.00%	100.00%

=== 2000 Census ===
As of the census of 2000, there were 158 people, 64 households, and 44 families residing in the town. The population density was 208.0 inhabitants per square mile (80.3/km^{2}). There were 75 housing units at an average density of 98.7 per square mile (38.1/km^{2}). The racial makeup of the town was 79.11% Black or African American, 18.99% White and 1.90% from two or more races.

There were 64 households, out of which 21.9% had children under the age of 18 living with them, 32.8% were married couples living together, 32.8% had a female householder with no husband present, and 29.7% were non-families. 29.7% of all households were made up of individuals, and 7.8% had someone living alone who was 65 years of age or older. The average household size was 2.47 and the average family size was 2.93.

In the town, the population was spread out, with 21.5% under the age of 18, 7.0% from 18 to 24, 24.7% from 25 to 44, 29.7% from 45 to 64, and 17.1% who were 65 years of age or older. The median age was 43 years. For every 100 females, there were 119.4 males. For every 100 females age 18 and over, there were 100.0 males.

The median income for a household in the town was $18,750, and the median income for a family was $16,875. Males had a median income of $34,286 versus $11,250 for females. The per capita income for the town was $17,464. About 45.3% of families and 46.2% of the population were below the poverty line, including 57.4% of those under the age of eighteen and 55.6% of those 65 or over.
