= Egypt, Alabama =

Egypt, Alabama may refer to:

- Egypt, Bibb County, Alabama, a ghost town
- Egypt, Etowah County, Alabama, a census-designated place
- Egypt, Marshall County, Alabama, an unincorporated community
