= New Union =

New Union can refer to:

- New Union, Alabama, a census-designated place in the United States
- New Union, Manchester, a listed public house in Manchester, England
- New Union, Tennessee, a census-designated place in the United States
- New Union (Social Liberals), a Lithuanian Liberal political party
- New Unionism, a British trade union movement of the late 1880s
- A term usually associated with the countries which joined the European Union following the 2004 and 2007 enlargements (that includes Bulgaria, Cyprus, Czech Republic, Estonia, Hungary, Latvia, Lithuania, Malta, Poland, Romania, Slovakia and Slovenia) to differ them from the so-called "Old Union" (consisting of the EU15)
