= Mountainboro, Boaz =

Mountainboro, Alabama
- Neighborhood
- Location in Etowah County and the state of Alabama
- Coordinates: 34°8′52″N 86°7′54″W
- Country: United States
- State: Alabama
- County: Etowah

Area
  - Total: 0.81 sq mi (2.1 km^{2})
  - Land: 0.81 sq mi (2.1 km^{2})
  - Water: 0 sq mi (0 km^{2})
- Elevation: 1,112 ft (339 m)

Population (2000)
  - Total: 338
  - Density: 420/sq mi (161/km^{2})
- Time zone: UTC-6 (Central (CST))
  - Summer (DST): UTC-5 (CDT)
- FIPS code: 01-51672
- GNIS feature ID: 0123537

Mountainboro is a neighborhood in the city of Boaz, Alabama.

== History ==
Mountainboro was incorporated on October 31, 1963. Additional land was annexed into the town on March 12, 1981, and September 14, 1993. The 1993 annexation included the Skyhaven Estate subdivision. In October 2007, a referendum that proposed annexation of Mountainboro by the city of Boaz was passed by a one-vote margin. The result of the referendum was challenged, and legal activities delayed further action until 2009. Etowah County Circuit Judge David Kimberley upheld the result of the referendum, and Mountainboro as a town ceased to exist on August 14, 2009.

== Demographics ==
Historical population
Census	Pop.	Note	%±
1970	311		—
1980	266		−14.5%
1990	261		−1.9%
2000	338		29.5%
U.S. Decennial Census

As of the census of 2000, there were 338 people, 128 households, and 88 families residing in the town. The population density was 417.9 inhabitants per square mile (161.4/km^{2}). There were 142 housing units at an average density of 175.6 per square mile (67.8/km^{2}). The racial makeup of the town was 96.15% White, 0.30% Black or African American, 1.48% Asian, 0.89% from other races, and 1.18% from two or more races. 1.78% of the population were Hispanic or Latino of any race.

There were 128 households, out of which 25.8% had children under the age of 18 living with them, 54.7% were married couples living together, 11.7% had a female householder with no husband present, and 30.5% were non-families. 25.0% of all households were made up of individuals, and 10.9% had someone living alone who was 65 years of age or older. The average household size was 2.64 and the average family size was 3.19.

In the town the population was spread out, with 25.7% under the age of 18, 6.8% from 18 to 24, 27.2% from 25 to 44, 23.7% from 45 to 64, and 16.6% who were 65 years of age or older. The median age was 40 years. For every 100 females, there were 93.1 males. For every 100 females age 18 and over, there were 100.8 males.

The median income for a household in the town was $28,125, and the median income for a family was $36,563. Males had a median income of $29,306 versus $15,938 for females. The per capita income for the town was $12,843. About 17.3% of families and 19.1% of the population were below the poverty line, including 28.8% of those under age 18 and 6.0% of those age 65 or over.
