= Pilgrims Rest, Alabama =

Unincorporated community in Alabama, United States

- Unincorporated community
- Location within Alabama Location within the United States
- Coordinates: 33°55′00″N 86°00′46″W
- Country: United States
- State: Alabama
- County: Etowah
- Elevation: 564 ft (172 m)
- Time zone: UTC-6 (Central (CST))
  - Summer (DST): UTC-5 (CDT)
- Area codes: 256 & 938
- GNIS feature ID: 149102

Pilgrims Rest is an unincorporated community in Etowah County, Alabama, United States.
