= Liberty Hill, Alabama =

Liberty Hill may refer to the following places in the U.S. state of Alabama:

- Liberty Hill, Cleburne County, Alabama
- Liberty Hill, Etowah County, Alabama
- Liberty Hill, Franklin County, Alabama
- Liberty Hill, Jackson County, Alabama
- Liberty Hill, Talladega County, Alabama
