= Alabama State Route 291 =

Highway in Alabama

State Route 291
- George Wallace Drive

Route information
- Maintained by ALDOT
- Length: 0.890 mi (1,432 m)

Major junctions
- South end: SR 759 in Gadsden
- North end: US 278 / US 431 in Gadsden

Location
- Country: United States
- State: Alabama
- Counties: Etowah

Highway system
- Alabama State Highway System; Interstate; US; State
← SR 289	→ SR 293

State Route 291 (SR 291) is a 0.89-mile-long (1.43 km) route that serves as a connection between SR 759 and US 278/US 431 in the eastern section of Gadsden in Etowah County. It was originally proposed as an extension of SR 759.

== Route description ==
The southern terminus of SR 291 is located at the eastern terminus of SR 759. From this point, the route generally travels northward before terminating at US 278/US 431 in Gadsden.

== Major intersections ==
The entire route is in Gadsden, Etowah County.

mi	km	Destinations	Notes
0.000	0.000	SR 759 west to I-759	Southern terminus
0.890	1.432	US 278 / US 431 (E Meighan Boulevard/SR 74/SR 1)	Northern terminus
1.000 mi = 1.609 km; 1.000 km = 0.621 mi
