= List of census-designated places =

The list of census-designated places has been divided by state:

== List ==
=== A ===
- List of census-designated places in Alabama
- List of census-designated places in Alaska
- List of census-designated places in Arizona
- List of census-designated places in Arkansas

=== C ===
- List of census-designated places in California
- List of census-designated places in Colorado
- List of census-designated places in Connecticut

=== D ===
- List of census-designated places in Delaware

=== F ===
- List of census-designated places in Florida

=== G ===
- List of census-designated places in Georgia

=== H ===
- List of census-designated places in Hawaii

=== I ===
- List of census-designated places in Idaho
- List of census-designated places in Illinois
- List of census-designated places in Indiana
- List of census-designated places in Iowa

=== K ===
- List of census-designated places in Kansas
- List of census-designated places in Kentucky

=== L ===
- List of census-designated places in Louisiana

=== M ===
- List of census-designated places in Maine
- List of census-designated places in Maryland
- List of census-designated places in Massachusetts
- List of census-designated places in Michigan
- List of census-designated places in Minnesota
- List of census-designated places in Mississippi
- List of census-designated places in Missouri
- List of census-designated places in Montana

=== N ===
- List of census-designated places in Nebraska
- List of census-designated places in Nevada
- List of census-designated places in New Hampshire
- List of census-designated places in New Jersey
- List of census-designated places in New Mexico
- List of census-designated places in New York
- List of census-designated places in North Carolina
- List of census-designated places in North Dakota

=== O ===
- List of census-designated places in Ohio
- List of census-designated places in Oklahoma
- List of census-designated places in Oregon

=== P ===
- List of census-designated places in Pennsylvania

=== R ===
- List of census-designated places in Rhode Island

=== S ===
- List of census-designated places in South Carolina
- List of census-designated places in South Dakota

=== T ===
- List of census-designated places in Tennessee
- List of census-designated places in Texas

=== U ===
- List of census-designated places in Utah

=== V ===
- List of census-designated places in Vermont
- List of census-designated places in Virginia

=== W ===
- List of census-designated places in Washington
- List of census-designated places in West Virginia
- List of census-designated places in Wisconsin
- List of census-designated places in Wyoming
