= Whitesboro, Alabama =

- Census-designated place

- Location of Whitesboro in Etowah County, Alabama.
- Coordinates: 34°09′48″N 86°04′10″W
- Country: United States
- State: Alabama
- County: Etowah

Area
  - Total: 17.50 sq mi (45.32 km^{2})
  - Land: 17.48 sq mi (45.27 km^{2})
  - Water: 0.023 sq mi (0.06 km^{2})
- Elevation: 1,043 ft (318 m)

Population (2020)
  - Total: 2,113
  - Density: 120.9/sq mi (46.68/km^{2})
- Time zone: UTC-6 (Central (CST))
  - Summer (DST): UTC-5 (CDT)
- Area codes: 256 & 938
- GNIS feature ID: 2582708

Whitesboro is a census-designated place and unincorporated community in Etowah County, Alabama, United States. As of the 2020 census, Whitesboro had a population of 2,113.

== Demographics ==
Historical population
Census	Pop.	Note	%±
2010	2,138		—
2020	2,113		−1.2%
U.S. Decennial Census

Whitesboro was listed as a census designated place in the 2010 U.S. census.

=== Racial and ethnic composition ===
Whitesboro CDP, Alabama – Racial and ethnic composition Note: the US Census treats Hispanic/Latino as an ethnic category. This table excludes Latinos from the racial categories and assigns them to a separate category. Hispanics/Latinos may be of any race.
Race / Ethnicity (NH = Non-Hispanic)	Pop 2010	Pop 2020	% 2010	% 2020
White alone (NH)	2,060	1,956	96.35%	92.57%
Black or African American alone (NH)	15	17	0.70%	0.80%
Native American or Alaska Native alone (NH)	14	13	0.65%	0.62%
Asian alone (NH)	6	5	0.28%	0.24%
Native Hawaiian or Pacific Islander alone (NH)	0	2	0.00%	0.09%
Other race alone (NH)	0	2	0.00%	0.09%
Mixed race or Multiracial (NH)	19	88	0.89%	4.16%
Hispanic or Latino (any race)	24	30	1.12%	1.42%
Total	2,138	2,113	100.00%	100.00%

=== 2020 census ===
As of the 2020 census, the median age was 41.9 years. 21.2% of residents were under the age of 18 and 18.1% of residents were 65 years of age or older. For every 100 females there were 100.9 males, and for every 100 females age 18 and over there were 92.9 males age 18 and over.

0.0% of residents lived in urban areas, while 100.0% lived in rural areas.

There were 842 households in Whitesboro, of which 30.4% had children under the age of 18 living in them. Of all households, 58.0% were married-couple households, 14.3% were households with a male householder and no spouse or partner present, and 24.1% were households with a female householder and no spouse or partner present. About 24.1% of all households were made up of individuals and 12.5% had someone living alone who was 65 years of age or older.

There were 910 housing units, of which 7.5% were vacant. The homeowner vacancy rate was 0.7% and the rental vacancy rate was 1.7%.
