= Interstate 759 =

Highway in Alabama

Interstate 759 and State Route 759
- I-759 highlighted in red; SR 759 in blue

Route information
- Length: 5.407 mi (8.702 km) 4.541 mi (7.308 km) as I-759; 0.866 mi (1.394 km) as SR 759
- Existed: October 22, 1986–present

Major junctions
- West end: I-59 in Attalla
- US 411 in Gadsden
- East end: SR 291 in Gadsden

Location
- Country: United States
- State: Alabama
- Counties: Etowah

Highway system
- Interstate Highway System; Main; Auxiliary; Suffixed; Business; Future; Alabama State Highway System; Interstate; US; State
← I-685	→ SR 959

Interstate 759 (I-759) is a part of the Interstate Highway System in the US state of Alabama. It is a spur route that runs for 4.54 miles (7.31 km) between the cities of Attalla and Gadsden in Etowah County. It begins at I-59 in Attalla and ends at U.S. Route 411 (US 411) in southern Gadsden adjacent to the Gadsden Mall. After it loses its I-759 designation, the route continues east as the at-grade thoroughfare State Route 759 (SR 759) until the route ends at SR 291 in Gadsden. SR 759 is the only odd-numbered route in the state that is signed as "east–west" rather than "north–south".

== Route description ==
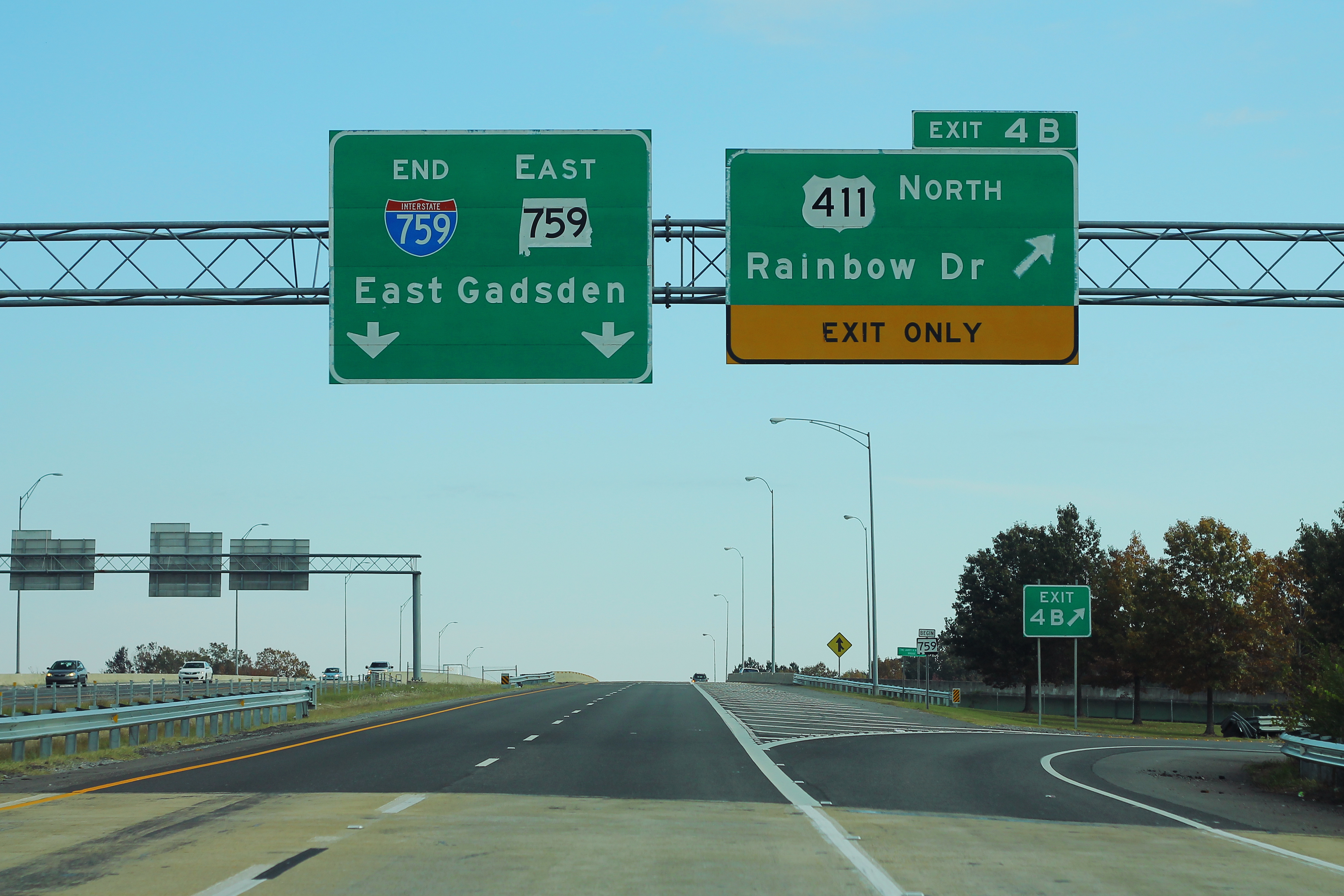
I-759 becomes SR 759 at US 411.

I-759 begins at exit 182 of I-59 in Attalla. From this point, the route travels in an easterly direction across a marshy area prior to reaching its first exit at Black Creek Parkway, a diamond interchange. From the Black Creek exit, I-759 continues in its easterly direction and crosses the Coosa River along a causeway and short bridge prior to reaching US 411. At the US 411 interchange, the I-759 designation ends, but the route continues as SR 759 in spanning the Coosa River.

About 3/4 mile (1.2 km) from the start of SR 759, the freeway becomes a single carriageway roadway before ending at George Wallace Drive.

== History ==
I-759 opened to traffic on October 22, 1986.

A new four-lane bridge crossing the Coosa River opened in 2004.

== Future ==
Currently, there are plans to extend I-759 east to US 278 on the east side of Gadsden. In March 2021, the Alabama Department of Transportation (ALDOT) announced that they had authorized a $2 million to initiate the engineering design for the extension. In May 2022, ALDOT announced that it would fund the $65 million eastern extension. There have also been plans to extend the route west from I-59 to US 431 in Attalla.

== Exit list ==
The entire route is in Etowah County.

Location	mi	km	Exit	Destinations	Notes
Attalla	0.00	0.00	0A-B	I-59 – Birmingham, Chattanooga	Western terminus of I-759; I-59 exit 182; signed as left exit 0A (south) & 0B (north) westbound; tri-stack interchange.
Gadsden	2.67	4.30	2	Black Creek Parkway	
Gadsden	4.32 0.00	6.95 0.00	4	US 411 (SR 25/Rainbow Drive) – Rainbow City, Gadsden	Signed as exits 4A (south) and 4B (north); eastern terminus of I-759; western terminus of SR 759
Gadsden	0.35	0.56	Bridge over Coosa River		
Gadsden				SR 291 north to US 431 / US 278	Eastern terminus of SR 759
1.000 mi = 1.609 km; 1.000 km = 0.621 mi: Route transition
