= Ivalee, Alabama =

Unincorporated community in Alabama, United States

- Census-designated place
- Location of Ivalee in Etowah County, Alabama.
- Coordinates: 34°02′04″N 86°08′43″W
- Country: United States
- State: Alabama
- County: Etowah

Area
  - Total: 7.45 sq mi (19.30 km^{2})
  - Land: 7.45 sq mi (19.30 km^{2})
  - Water: 0 sq mi (0.00 km^{2})
- Elevation: 669 ft (204 m)

Population (2020)
  - Total: 946
  - Density: 126.9/sq mi (49.01/km^{2})
- Time zone: UTC-6 (Central (CST))
  - Summer (DST): UTC-5 (CDT)
- Area codes: 256 & 938
- GNIS feature ID: 2582684

Ivalee is a census-designated place and unincorporated community in Etowah County, Alabama, United States. As of the 2020 census, Ivalee had a population of 946.

== Demographics ==
Historical population
Census	Pop.	Note	%±
2010	879		—
2020	946		7.6%
U.S. Decennial Census

Ivalee was listed as a census designated place in the 2010 U.S. census.

Ivalee CDP, Alabama – Racial and ethnic composition Note: the US Census treats Hispanic/Latino as an ethnic category. This table excludes Latinos from the racial categories and assigns them to a separate category. Hispanics/Latinos may be of any race.
Race / Ethnicity (NH = Non-Hispanic)	Pop 2010	Pop 2020	% 2010	% 2020
White alone (NH)	843	887	95.90%	93.76%
Black or African American alone (NH)	14	11	1.59%	1.16%
Native American or Alaska Native alone (NH)	4	1	0.46%	0.11%
Asian alone (NH)	0	0	0.00%	0.00%
Native Hawaiian or Pacific Islander alone (NH)	0	0	0.00%	0.00%
Other race alone (NH)	3	2	0.34%	0.21%
Mixed race or Multiracial (NH)	3	28	0.34%	2.96%
Hispanic or Latino (any race)	12	17	1.37%	1.80%
Total	879	946	100.00%	100.00%
