= Gallant, Alabama =

Unincorporated community in Alabama, United States

- Census-designated place
- Location of Gallant in Etowah County, Alabama.
- Coordinates: 33°59′58″N 86°14′43″W
- Country: United States
- State: Alabama
- County: Etowah

Area
  - Total: 14.43 sq mi (37.38 km^{2})
  - Land: 14.38 sq mi (37.25 km^{2})
  - Water: 0.050 sq mi (0.13 km^{2})
- Elevation: 774 ft (236 m)

Population (2020)
  - Total: 869
  - Density: 60.4/sq mi (23.33/km^{2})
- Time zone: UTC-6 (Central (CST))
  - Summer (DST): UTC-5 (CDT)
- ZIP codes: 35972
- FIPS code: 01-28816
- GNIS feature ID: 2582676

Gallant, also known as Clear Springs or Greasy Cove, is a census-designated place and unincorporated community in Etowah, and St. Clair counties, Alabama, United States. It lies west of the city of Gadsden, the county seat of Etowah County. As of the 2020 census, Gallant had a population of 869. It has a post office with the ZIP code 35972.

Gallant was the name of a pioneer settler who came from Tennessee.

== Recreation ==
Camp Sumatanga is a 1700-acre facility surrounded by the woods, mountains, lakes and streams. The many recreational activities available include fishing, swimming, archery, hiking, and camping. Summer camp is available for children. There are three chapels that are available for reservation for weddings and other ceremonies.

Dayspring Dairy is Alabama's first sheep dairy, offering hard and soft farmstead cheeses, a farm store with free tasting, and farm tours.

== Demographics ==
Historical population
| Census | Pop. | Note | %± |
|---|---|---|---|
| 2010 | 855 | | — |
| 2020 | 869 | | 1.6% |
U.S. Decennial Census

Gallant was listed as a census designated place in the 2010 U.S. census.

Gallant CDP, Alabama – Racial and ethnic composition Note: the US Census treats Hispanic/Latino as an ethnic category. This table excludes Latinos from the racial categories and assigns them to a separate category. Hispanics/Latinos may be of any race.
| Race / Ethnicity (NH = Non-Hispanic) | Pop 2010 | Pop 2020 | % 2010 | % 2020 |
|---|---|---|---|---|
| White alone (NH) | 820 | 818 | 95.91% | 94.13% |
| Black or African American alone (NH) | 2 | 2 | 0.23% | 0.23% |
| Native American or Alaska Native alone (NH) | 5 | 0 | 0.58% | 0.00% |
| Asian alone (NH) | 0 | 3 | 0.00% | 0.35% |
| Native Hawaiian or Pacific Islander alone (NH) | 0 | 0 | 0.00% | 0.00% |
| Other race alone (NH) | 0 | 4 | 0.00% | 0.46% |
| Mixed race or Multiracial (NH) | 14 | 23 | 1.64% | 2.65% |
| Hispanic or Latino (any race) | 14 | 19 | 1.64% | 2.19% |
| Total | 855 | 869 | 100.00% | 100.00% |
