= Ballplay, Alabama =

Unincorporated community in Alabama, United States

- Unincorporated community Census-designated place
- Location of Ballplay in Etowah County, Alabama.
- Coordinates: 33°59′25″N 85°46′05″W
- Country: United States
- State: Alabama
- County: Etowah

Area
  - Total: 23.74 sq mi (61.48 km^{2})
  - Land: 23.55 sq mi (61.00 km^{2})
  - Water: 0.19 sq mi (0.49 km^{2})
- Elevation: 581 ft (177 m)

Population (2020)
  - Total: 1,437
  - Density: 61.0/sq mi (23.56/km^{2})
- Time zone: UTC-6 (Central (CST))
  - Summer (DST): UTC-5 (CDT)
- Area codes: 256 & 938
- GNIS feature ID: 2582662

Ballplay is an unincorporated community and census-designated place (CDP) in Etowah County, Alabama, United States. Its population was 1,437 as of the 2020 census.

== History ==
Ballplay was so named because Native Americans would play stickball at the site in order to resolve disputes between tribes. A post office was established at Ballplay in 1840, and remained in operation until it was discontinued in 1905.

== Demographics ==
Historical population
Census	Pop.	Note	%±
2010	1,580		—
2020	1,437		−9.1%
U.S. Decennial Census

Ballplay was listed as a census designated place in the 2010 U.S. census.

=== Racial and ethnic composition ===
Ballplay CDP, Alabama – Racial and ethnic composition Note: the US Census treats Hispanic/Latino as an ethnic category. This table excludes Latinos from the racial categories and assigns them to a separate category. Hispanics/Latinos may be of any race.
Race / Ethnicity (NH = Non-Hispanic)	Pop 2010	Pop 2020	% 2010	% 2020
White alone (NH)	1,529	1,333	96.77%	92.76%
Black or African American alone (NH)	2	3	0.13%	0.21%
Native American or Alaska Native alone (NH)	11	9	0.70%	0.63%
Asian alone (NH)	3	7	0.19%	0.49%
Native Hawaiian or Pacific Islander alone (NH)	0	0	0.00%	0.00%
Other race alone (NH)	0	5	0.00%	0.35%
Mixed race or Multiracial (NH)	19	64	1.20%	4.45%
Hispanic or Latino (any race)	16	16	1.01%	1.11%
Total	1,580	1,437	100.00%	100.00%

=== 2020 census ===
As of the 2020 census, Ballplay had a population of 1,437. The median age was 42.2 years. 21.7% of residents were under the age of 18 and 18.0% of residents were 65 years of age or older. For every 100 females there were 91.1 males, and for every 100 females age 18 and over there were 90.7 males age 18 and over.

0.0% of residents lived in urban areas, while 100.0% lived in rural areas.

There were 567 households in Ballplay, of which 26.3% had children under the age of 18 living in them. Of all households, 49.0% were married-couple households, 22.8% were households with a male householder and no spouse or partner present, and 24.9% were households with a female householder and no spouse or partner present. About 24.9% of all households were made up of individuals and 8.7% had someone living alone who was 65 years of age or older.

There were 656 housing units, of which 13.6% were vacant. The homeowner vacancy rate was 2.8% and the rental vacancy rate was 16.3%.
