= Liberty Hill, Etowah County, Alabama =

Unincorporated community in Alabama, United States

Liberty Hill, Alabama
- Unincorporated community
- Location within Alabama Location within the United States
- Coordinates: 34°10′40″N 86°01′49″W
- Country: United States
- State: Alabama
- County: Etowah
- Elevation: 1,079 ft (329 m)
- Time zone: UTC-6 (Central (CST))
  - Summer (DST): UTC-5 (CDT)
- Area codes: 256 & 938
- GNIS feature ID: 149077

Liberty Hill is an unincorporated community in Etowah County, Alabama, United States, located 5.3 miles (8.5 km) east of Sardis City.
