= Lookout Mountain, Alabama =

- Census-designated place
- Location of Lookout Mountain in Etowah County, Alabama.
- Coordinates: 34°06′57″N 85°57′56″W
- Country: United States
- State: Alabama
- County: Etowah

Area
  - Total: 15.24 sq mi (39.48 km^{2})
  - Land: 15.23 sq mi (39.45 km^{2})
  - Water: 0.015 sq mi (0.04 km^{2})
- Elevation: 833 ft (254 m)

Population (2020)
  - Total: 1,484
  - Density: 97.4/sq mi (37.62/km^{2})
- Time zone: UTC-6 (Central (CST))
  - Summer (DST): UTC-5 (CDT)
- Area codes: 256 & 938
- GNIS feature ID: 2582685

Lookout Mountain is a census-designated place in Etowah County, Alabama, United States. As of the 2020 census, Lookout Mountain had a population of 1,484.

== Demographics ==
Historical population
Census	Pop.	Note	%±
2010	1,621		—
2020	1,484		−8.5%
U.S. Decennial Census

Lookout Mountain was listed as a census designated place in the 2010 U.S. census.

=== Racial and ethnic composition ===
Lookout Mountain CDP, Alabama – Racial and ethnic composition Note: the US Census treats Hispanic/Latino as an ethnic category. This table excludes Latinos from the racial categories and assigns them to a separate category. Hispanics/Latinos may be of any race.
Race / Ethnicity (NH = Non-Hispanic)	Pop 2010	Pop 2020	% 2010	% 2020
White alone (NH)	1,547	1,347	95.43%	90.77%
Black or African American alone (NH)	38	10	2.34%	0.67%
Native American or Alaska Native alone (NH)	6	2	0.37%	0.13%
Asian alone (NH)	0	3	0.00%	0.20%
Native Hawaiian or Pacific Islander alone (NH)	0	0	0.00%	0.00%
Other race alone (NH)	1	2	0.06%	0.13%
Mixed race or Multiracial (NH)	9	82	0.56%	5.53%
Hispanic or Latino (any race)	20	38	1.23%	2.56%
Total	1,621	1,484	100.00%	100.00%

=== 2020 census ===
As of the 2020 census, Lookout Mountain had a population of 1,484. The median age was 44.7 years. 20.1% of residents were under the age of 18 and 18.1% of residents were 65 years of age or older. For every 100 females there were 101.4 males, and for every 100 females age 18 and over there were 95.4 males age 18 and over.

0.0% of residents lived in urban areas, while 100.0% lived in rural areas.

There were 604 households in Lookout Mountain, of which 27.0% had children under the age of 18 living in them. Of all households, 57.5% were married-couple households, 18.7% were households with a male householder and no spouse or partner present, and 20.0% were households with a female householder and no spouse or partner present. About 26.0% of all households were made up of individuals and 13.4% had someone living alone who was 65 years of age or older.

There were 702 housing units, of which 14.0% were vacant. The homeowner vacancy rate was 1.7% and the rental vacancy rate was 8.5%.
