= Carlisle-Rockledge, Alabama =

- Unincorporated community Census-designated place
- Location within Alabama
- Coordinates: 34°06′52″N 86°07′27″W
- Country: United States
- State: Alabama
- County: Etowah

Area
  - Total: 16.20 sq mi (41.97 km^{2})
  - Land: 16.20 sq mi (41.96 km^{2})
  - Water: 0.0039 sq mi (0.01 km^{2})
- Elevation: 1,030 ft (310 m)

Population (2020)
  - Total: 2,167
  - Density: 133.8/sq mi (51.65/km^{2})
- Time zone: UTC-6 (Central (CST))
  - Summer (DST): UTC-5 (CDT)
- Area codes: 256 & 938
- FIPS code: 01-12070
- GNIS feature ID: 2582667

Carlisle-Rockledge is a census-designated place in Etowah County, Alabama, United States. The CDP includes the communities of Carlisle and Rockledge, both of which are located along U.S. Route 431 in northwest Etowah County. As of the 2020 census, Carlisle-Rockledge had a population of 2,167.

== Demographics ==
Historical population
Census	Pop.	Note	%±
2010	2,137		—
2020	2,167		1.4%
U.S. Decennial Census

Carlisle-Rockledge was listed as a census designated place in the 2010 U.S. census.

=== Racial and ethnic composition ===
Carlisle-Rockledge CDP, Alabama – Racial and ethnic composition Note: the US Census treats Hispanic/Latino as an ethnic category. This table excludes Latinos from the racial categories and assigns them to a separate category. Hispanics/Latinos may be of any race.
Race / Ethnicity (NH = Non-Hispanic)	Pop 2010	Pop 2020	% 2010	% 2020
White alone (NH)	2,007	1,888	93.92%	87.13%
Black or African American alone (NH)	19	29	0.89%	1.34%
Native American or Alaska Native alone (NH)	19	11	0.89%	0.51%
Asian alone (NH)	3	3	0.14%	0.14%
Native Hawaiian or Pacific Islander alone (NH)	0	2	0.00%	0.09%
Other race alone (NH)	0	2	0.00%	0.09%
Mixed race or Multiracial (NH)	23	109	1.08%	5.03%
Hispanic or Latino (any race)	66	123	3.09%	5.68%
Total	2,137	2,167	100.00%	100.00%

=== 2020 census ===
As of the 2020 census, Carlisle-Rockledge had a population of 2,167. The median age was 39.6 years. 23.6% of residents were under the age of 18 and 16.8% of residents were 65 years of age or older. For every 100 females there were 96.3 males, and for every 100 females age 18 and over there were 96.8 males age 18 and over.

0.4% of residents lived in urban areas, while 99.6% lived in rural areas.

There were 823 households in Carlisle-Rockledge, of which 29.5% had children under the age of 18 living in them. Of all households, 47.3% were married-couple households, 19.3% were households with a male householder and no spouse or partner present, and 27.6% were households with a female householder and no spouse or partner present. About 30.2% of all households were made up of individuals and 13.7% had someone living alone who was 65 years of age or older.

There were 914 housing units, of which 10.0% were vacant. The homeowner vacancy rate was 1.5% and the rental vacancy rate was 1.1%.
