= Bristow Cove, Alabama =

Unincorporated community in Alabama, United States

- Unincorporated community Census-designated place
- Location of Bristow Cove in Etowah County, Alabama.
- Coordinates: 34°06′33″N 86°14′28″W
- Country: United States
- State: Alabama
- County: Etowah

Area
  - Total: 10.84 sq mi (28.08 km^{2})
  - Land: 10.84 sq mi (28.08 km^{2})
  - Water: 0 sq mi (0.00 km^{2})
- Elevation: 1,020 ft (310 m)

Population (2020)
  - Total: 624
  - Density: 57.5/sq mi (22.22/km^{2})
- Time zone: UTC-6 (Central (CST))
  - Summer (DST): UTC-5 (CDT)
- Area codes: 256 & 938
- GNIS feature ID: 2582664

Bristow Cove is an unincorporated community and census-designated place (CDP) in Etowah County, Alabama, United States. Its population was 624 as of the 2020 census.

== Demographics ==
Historical population
Census	Pop.	Note	%±
2010	683		—
2020	624		−8.6%
U.S. Decennial Census

Bristow Cove was listed as a census designated place in the 2010 U.S. census.

=== 2020 census ===
Bristow Cove CDP, Alabama – Racial and ethnic composition Note: the US Census treats Hispanic/Latino as an ethnic category. This table excludes Latinos from the racial categories and assigns them to a separate category. Hispanics/Latinos may be of any race.
Race / Ethnicity (NH = Non-Hispanic)	Pop 2010	Pop 2020	% 2010	% 2020
White alone (NH)	621	559	90.92%	89.58%
Black or African American alone (NH)	0	0	0.00%	0.00%
Native American or Alaska Native alone (NH)	10	5	1.46%	0.80%
Asian alone (NH)	1	1	0.15%	0.16%
Native Hawaiian or Pacific Islander alone (NH)	0	0	0.00%	0.00%
Other race alone (NH)	0	0	0.00%	0.00%
Mixed race or Multiracial (NH)	6	20	0.88%	3.21%
Hispanic or Latino (any race)	45	39	6.59%	6.25%
Total	683	624	100.00%	100.00%
