= David W. Baine =

American lawyer

- Born: August 29, 1829; Connecticut, U.S.
- Died: June 30, 1862 (aged 32); Virginia, U.S.
- Education: Allegheny College
- Spouse: Mary Powell Hogue
- Children: 1 son, 2 daughters
- Parent(s): John McBain; Maria Adkins

Lieutenant-Colonel David W. Baine (August 29, 1829 – June 30, 1862) was an American lawyer and Confederate veteran. He was a lawyer in Hayneville, Alabama, and an advocate of secession. He was the namesake of Baine County, Alabama, now known as Etowah County, Alabama.

== Early life ==
David W. Baine was born on August 29, 1829, in Connecticut. His father, John McBain, was a Scottish immigrant from Dunfermline and a Methodist preacher. His mother, Maria Adkins, descended from an old Puritan family.

Baine graduated from Allegheny College at the age of 17.

== Career ==
Baine began his career as a schoolteacher in Centre, Alabama, in 1848. By 1855, he became a lawyer thanks to the influence of Thomas B. Cooper. A year later, he moved to Hayneville, Alabama. He quickly became the commanding officer (“general”) of a local band of militia, the Hayneville Guards. He also shared an office with William L. Yancey in Montgomery, Alabama. He was a delegate from Lowndes County, Alabama, at the 1860 Democratic National Convention, where he supported the secession of Alabama from the Union.

During the American Civil War of 1861-1865, Baine joined the Confederate States Army by enlisting in the 1st Regiment Alabama. On August 1, 1861, he became a Lieutenant Colonel in the 14th Regiment Alabama. He was first stationed in Camp Jones, Huntsville, Alabama, and he was transferred to Richmond, Virginia, on November 4, 1861. He took part in the Seven Days Battles of June–July 1862, where he commanded the 14th Regiment Alabama alongside General James Longstreet's 5th brigade. His last military action was at the Battle of Frazier's Farm.

== Personal life and death ==
Baine married Mary Powell Hogue, a Southern belle. They had two daughters, Mary (born 1850) and Mildred (born 1855), and a son, Thomas Cooper (born 1860). They resided on Washington Street in Hayneville, Alabama.

Baine was killed in battle on June 30, 1862. In 1866-1867, Etowah County, Alabama, was called Baine County in his honor.
