= Coats Bend, Alabama =

- Census-designated place
- Location of Coats Bend in Etowah County, Alabama.
- Coordinates: 34°04′39″N 85°52′27″W
- Country: United States
- State: Alabama
- County: Etowah

Area
  - Total: 8.58 sq mi (22.21 km^{2})
  - Land: 8.55 sq mi (22.14 km^{2})
  - Water: 0.027 sq mi (0.07 km^{2})
- Elevation: 614 ft (187 m)

Population (2020)
  - Total: 1,318
  - Density: 154.2/sq mi (59.52/km^{2})
- Time zone: UTC-6 (Central (CST))
  - Summer (DST): UTC-5 (CDT)
- ZIP code: 35901
- Area codes: 256 & 938
- GNIS feature ID: 2582669

Coats Bend is a census-designated place in Etowah County, Alabama, United States. As of the 2020 census, Coats Bend had a population of 1,318. A post office was established in 1878 and was in operation until 1903.

== Demographics ==
Historical population
Census	Pop.	Note	%±
2010	1,394		—
2020	1,318		−5.5%
U.S. Decennial Census

Coats Bend was listed as a census designated place in the 2010 U.S. census.

=== Racial and ethnic composition ===
Coats Bend CDP, Alabama – Racial and ethnic composition Note: the US Census treats Hispanic/Latino as an ethnic category. This table excludes Latinos from the racial categories and assigns them to a separate category. Hispanics/Latinos may be of any race.
Race / Ethnicity (NH = Non-Hispanic)	Pop 2010	Pop 2020	% 2010	% 2020
White alone (NH)	1,169	1,067	83.86%	80.96%
Black or African American alone (NH)	175	139	12.55%	10.55%
Native American or Alaska Native alone (NH)	7	9	0.50%	0.68%
Asian alone (NH)	0	4	0.00%	0.30%
Native Hawaiian or Pacific Islander alone (NH)	0	0	0.00%	0.00%
Other race alone (NH)	3	1	0.22%	0.08%
Mixed race or Multiracial (NH)	28	50	2.01%	3.79%
Hispanic or Latino (any race)	12	48	0.86%	3.64%
Total	1,394	1,318	100.00%	100.00%

=== 2020 census ===
As of the 2020 census, Coats Bend had a population of 1,318. The median age was 43.6 years. 22.3% of residents were under the age of 18 and 22.8% of residents were 65 years of age or older. For every 100 females there were 85.1 males, and for every 100 females age 18 and over there were 78.4 males age 18 and over.

0.0% of residents lived in urban areas, while 100.0% lived in rural areas.

There were 502 households in Coats Bend, of which 27.3% had children under the age of 18 living in them. Of all households, 52.2% were married-couple households, 12.9% were households with a male householder and no spouse or partner present, and 30.5% were households with a female householder and no spouse or partner present. About 24.1% of all households were made up of individuals and 12.4% had someone living alone who was 65 years of age or older.

There were 568 housing units, of which 11.6% were vacant. The homeowner vacancy rate was 2.3% and the rental vacancy rate was 22.6%.
