= Egypt, Etowah County, Alabama =

Unincorporated community in Alabama, United States

Egypt, Alabama
- Census-designated place
- Location within Alabama
- Coordinates: 34°04′25″N 86°09′21″W
- Country: United States
- State: Alabama
- County: Etowah

Area
  - Total: 9.01 sq mi (23.34 km^{2})
  - Land: 9.01 sq mi (23.34 km^{2})
  - Water: 0 sq mi (0.00 km^{2})
- Elevation: 1,076 ft (328 m)

Population (2020)
  - Total: 845
  - Density: 93.8/sq mi (36.21/km^{2})
- Time zone: UTC-6 (Central (CST))
  - Summer (DST): UTC-5 (CDT)
- Area codes: 256 & 938
- GNIS feature ID: 2582672

Egypt is a census-designated place and unincorporated community in Etowah County, Alabama, United States. Its population was 932 as of the 2010 census.

== Demographics ==
Historical population
Census	Pop.	Note	%±
2010	932		—
2020	845		−9.3%
U.S. Decennial Census

Egypt was listed as a census designated place in the 2010 U.S. census.

Egypt CDP, Alabama – Racial and ethnic composition Note: the US Census treats Hispanic/Latino as an ethnic category. This table excludes Latinos from the racial categories and assigns them to a separate category. Hispanics/Latinos may be of any race.
Race / Ethnicity (NH = Non-Hispanic)	Pop 2010	Pop 2020	% 2010	% 2020
White alone (NH)	869	752	93.24%	88.99%
Black or African American alone (NH)	8	4	0.86%	0.47%
Native American or Alaska Native alone (NH)	5	2	0.54%	0.24%
Asian alone (NH)	5	5	0.54%	0.59%
Native Hawaiian or Pacific Islander alone (NH)	0	10	0.00%	1.18%
Other race alone (NH)	0	2	0.00%	0.24%
Mixed race or Multiracial (NH)	14	26	1.50%	3.08%
Hispanic or Latino (any race)	31	44	3.33%	5.21%
Total	932	845	100.00%	100.00%
