= New Union, Alabama =

- Census-designated place
- Location of New Union in Etowah County, Alabama.
- Coordinates: 34°08′01″N 86°13′41″W
- Country: United States
- State: Alabama
- County: Etowah

Area
  - Total: 12.34 sq mi (31.96 km^{2})
  - Land: 12.31 sq mi (31.89 km^{2})
  - Water: 0.023 sq mi (0.06 km^{2})
- Elevation: 1,165 ft (355 m)

Population (2020)
  - Total: 1,019
  - Density: 82.8/sq mi (31.95/km^{2})
- Time zone: UTC-6 (Central (CST))
  - Summer (DST): UTC-5 (CDT)
- Area codes: 256 & 938
- GNIS feature ID: 2582691

New Union is a census-designated place in Etowah County, Alabama, United States. As of the 2020 census, New Union had a population of 1,019.

== Demographics ==
Historical population
| Census | Pop. | Note | %± |
|---|---|---|---|
| 2010 | 955 | | — |
| 2020 | 1,019 | | 6.7% |
U.S. Decennial Census

=== Racial and ethnic composition ===
New Union CDP, Alabama – Racial and ethnic composition Note: the US Census treats Hispanic/Latino as an ethnic category. This table excludes Latinos from the racial categories and assigns them to a separate category. Hispanics/Latinos may be of any race.
| Race / Ethnicity (NH = Non-Hispanic) | Pop 2010 | Pop 2020 | % 2010 | % 2020 |
|---|---|---|---|---|
| White alone (NH) | 903 | 886 | 94.55% | 86.95% |
| Black or African American alone (NH) | 2 | 5 | 0.21% | 0.49% |
| Native American or Alaska Native alone (NH) | 3 | 3 | 0.31% | 0.29% |
| Asian alone (NH) | 0 | 2 | 0.00% | 0.20% |
| Native Hawaiian or Pacific Islander alone (NH) | 0 | 0 | 0.00% | 0.00% |
| Other race alone (NH) | 0 | 4 | 0.00% | 0.39% |
| Mixed race or Multiracial (NH) | 7 | 50 | 0.73% | 4.91% |
| Hispanic or Latino (any race) | 40 | 69 | 4.19% | 6.77% |
| Total | 955 | 1,019 | 100.00% | 100.00% |

=== 2020 census ===
As of the 2020 census, New Union had a population of 1,019. The median age was 37.9 years. 24.5% of residents were under the age of 18 and 17.3% of residents were 65 years of age or older. For every 100 females there were 123.0 males, and for every 100 females age 18 and over there were 115.4 males age 18 and over.

0.0% of residents lived in urban areas, while 100.0% lived in rural areas.

There were 388 households in New Union, of which 29.4% had children under the age of 18 living in them. Of all households, 53.1% were married-couple households, 21.9% were households with a male householder and no spouse or partner present, and 18.3% were households with a female householder and no spouse or partner present. About 24.0% of all households were made up of individuals and 10.8% had someone living alone who was 65 years of age or older.

There were 432 housing units, of which 10.2% were vacant. The homeowner vacancy rate was 1.4% and the rental vacancy rate was 6.5%.

=== 2010 census ===
New Union was listed as a census designated place in the 2010 U.S. census.
