= Etowah County, Alabama =

County in Alabama, United States

- County
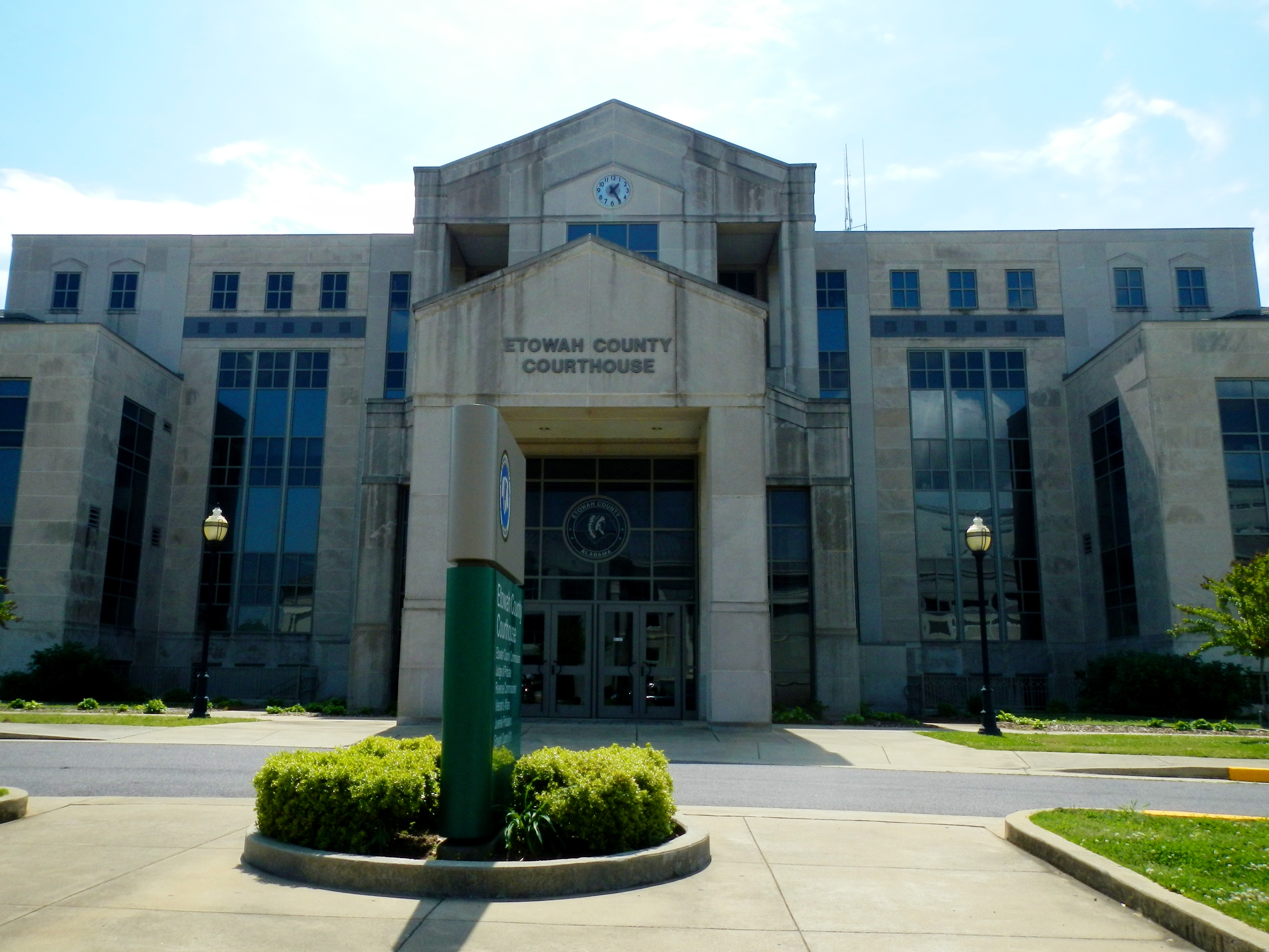
- Etowah County Courthouse in Gadsden

- Flag Seal

- Location within the U.S. state of Alabama
- Coordinates: 34°03′00″N 86°02′00″W
- Country: United States
- State: Alabama
- Founded: December 1, 1868
- Seat: Gadsden
- Largest city: Gadsden

Area
  - Total: 549 sq mi (1,420 km^{2})
  - Land: 535 sq mi (1,390 km^{2})
  - Water: 14 sq mi (36 km^{2}) 2.5%

Population (2020)
  - Total: 103,436
  - Estimate (2025): 103,886 ▲
  - Density: 193/sq mi (74.6/km^{2})
- Time zone: UTC−6 (Central)
  - Summer (DST): UTC−5 (CDT)
- Congressional district: 3rd
- Website: www.etowahcounty.org
- County Number 31 on Alabama License Plates

Etowah County is a county located in the northeastern part of the U.S. state of Alabama. As of the 2020 census the population was 103,436. Its county seat is Gadsden. Its name is from a Cherokee word meaning 'edible tree'. In total area, it is the smallest county in Alabama, albeit one of the most densely populated. Etowah County comprises the Gadsden Metropolitan Statistical Area.

== History ==
The area was split first among neighboring counties, with most of it belonging to DeKalb and Cherokee counties. On December 7, 1866, the first postwar legislature separated and established Baine County, named for David W. Baine, a politician and Confederate military officer who died in battle in 1862. Gadsden was designated as the county seat.

Because of postwar tensions and actions of insurgents against freedmen, at the state constitutional convention in 1868, the new county was abolished, replaced on December 1, 1868, by one aligned to the same boundaries and named Etowah County, from a Cherokee-language word. The Cherokee people in northeast Alabama had been forcibly removed in the 1830s to Indian Territory (now part of Oklahoma) west of the Mississippi River.

=== 20th century to present ===
Etowah County had issues of racial discrimination and injustice, and Jim Crow laws. It had one documented lynching between 1877 and 1950, which occurred in 1906. Bunk Richardson, an innocent African-American, only because he was associated with a case in which a white woman was raped and killed. The whites were angry that the governor had commuted the death sentence of one defendant in the case (who was likely also innocent of charges), after two men had already been executed for the crime.

An F4 tornado struck here on Palm Sunday March 27, 1994. It destroyed Piedmont's Goshen United Methodist Church twelve minutes after the National Weather Service of Birmingham issued a tornado warning for northern Calhoun, southeastern Etowah, and southern Cherokee counties.

== Geography ==
According to the United States Census Bureau, the county has a total area of 549 square miles (1,420 km^{2}), of which 535 square miles (1,390 km^{2}) is land and 14 square miles (36 km^{2}), or 2.5%, is water. It is the smallest county by area in Alabama.

=== Adjacent counties ===
- DeKalb County – north
- Cherokee County – east
- Calhoun County – southeast
- St. Clair County – southwest
- Blount County – west
- Marshall County – northwest

== Transportation ==
=== Transit ===
- Gadsden Trolley System
- Greyhound Lines

=== Major highways ===
- I-59
- I-759 / SR 759
- US 11 / SR 7 (unsigned)
- US 278 / SR 74 (unsigned)
- US 411 / SR 25 (unsigned)
- US 431 / SR 1 (unsigned)
- SR 77
- SR 132
- SR 179
- SR 205
- SR 211
- SR 291

=== Rail ===
- Alabama and Tennessee River Railway
- Norfolk Southern Railway
- Tennessee, Alabama and Georgia Railway (Defunct)

== Demographics ==
Historical population
Census	Pop.	Note	%±
1870	10,109		—
1880	15,398		52.3%
1890	21,926		42.4%
1900	27,361		24.8%
1910	39,109		42.9%
1920	47,275		20.9%
1930	63,399		34.1%
1940	72,580		14.5%
1950	93,892		29.4%
1960	96,980		3.3%
1970	94,144		−2.9%
1980	103,057		9.5%
1990	99,840		−3.1%
2000	103,459		3.6%
2010	104,430		0.9%
2020	103,436		−1.0%
2025 (est.)	103,886	▲	0.4%
U.S. Decennial Census; 1790–1960 1900–1990; 1990–2000 2010–2020

=== 2020 census ===
As of the 2020 census, the county had a population of 103,436. The median age was 42.4 years. 21.6% of residents were under the age of 18 and 19.9% of residents were 65 years of age or older. For every 100 females there were 93.7 males, and for every 100 females age 18 and over there were 90.7 males age 18 and over.

The racial makeup of the county was 76.0% White, 14.6% Black or African American, 0.7% American Indian and Alaska Native, 0.9% Asian, 0.1% Native Hawaiian and Pacific Islander, 2.6% from some other race, and 5.1% from two or more races. Hispanic or Latino residents of any race comprised 4.7% of the population.

56.8% of residents lived in urban areas, while 43.2% lived in rural areas.

There were 41,974 households in the county, of which 29.0% had children under the age of 18 living with them and 30.3% had a female householder with no spouse or partner present. About 29.2% of all households were made up of individuals and 13.8% had someone living alone who was 65 years of age or older.

There were 47,306 housing units, of which 11.3% were vacant. Among occupied housing units, 71.1% were owner-occupied and 28.9% were renter-occupied. The homeowner vacancy rate was 1.7% and the rental vacancy rate was 10.1%.

=== Racial and ethnic composition ===
Etowah County, Alabama – Racial and ethnic composition Note: the US Census treats Hispanic/Latino as an ethnic category. This table excludes Latinos from the racial categories and assigns them to a separate category. Hispanics/Latinos may be of any race.
Race / Ethnicity (NH = Non-Hispanic)	Pop 2000	Pop 2010	Pop 2020	% 2000	% 2010	% 2020
White alone (NH)	84,919	82,789	77,731	82.08%	79.28%	75.15%
Black or African American alone (NH)	15,120	15,716	14,999	14.61%	15.05%	14.50%
Native American or Alaska Native alone (NH)	329	372	332	0.32%	0.36%	0.32%
Asian alone (NH)	428	657	921	0.41%	0.63%	0.89%
Pacific Islander alone (NH)	27	30	39	0.03%	0.03%	0.04%
Other race alone (NH)	47	87	260	0.05%	0.08%	0.25%
Mixed race or Multiracial (NH)	826	1,332	4,259	0.80%	1.28%	4.12%
Hispanic or Latino (any race)	1,763	3,447	4,895	1.70%	3.30%	4.73%
Total	103,459	104,430	103,436	100.00%	100.00%	100.00%

=== 2010 census ===
At the 2010 census there were 104,430 people, 42,036 households, and 28,708 families living in the county. The population density was 195 people per square mile (75 people/km^{2}). There were 47,454 housing units at an average density of 86 units per square mile (33 units/km^{2}). The racial makeup of the county was 80.3% White, 15.1% Black or African American, 0.4% Native American, 0.6% Asian, 0.2% Pacific Islander, 1.9% from other races, and 1.5% from two or more races. 3.3% of the population were Hispanic or Latino of any race. Of the 42,036 households 27.1% had children under the age of 18 living with them, 49.3% were married couples living together, 14.3% had a female householder with no husband present, and 31.7% were non-families. 28.1% of households were one person and 11.9% were one person aged 65 or older. The average household size was 2.43 and the average family size was 2.97.

The age distribution was 23.0% under the age of 18, 8.5% from 18 to 24, 24.9% from 25 to 44, 27.8% from 45 to 64, and 15.8% 65 or older. The median age was 40.2 years. For every 100 females, there were 94.1 males. For every 100 females age 18 and over, there were 96.5 males.

The median household income was $36,422 and the median family income was $44,706. Males had a median income of $39,814 versus $30,220 for females. The per capita income for the county was $20,439. About 13.1% of families and 16.8% of the population were below the poverty line, including 24.6% of those under age 18 and 11.2% of those age 65 or over.

=== 2000 census ===
At the 2000 census there were 103,459 people, 41,615 households, and 29,463 families living in the county. The population density was 193 people per square mile (75 people/km^{2}). There were 45,959 housing units at an average density of 86 units per square mile (33 units/km^{2}). The racial makeup of the county was 82.9% White, 14.7% Black or African American, 0.3% Native American, 0.4% Asian, <0.1% Pacific Islander, 0.7% from other races, and 0.9% from two or more races. 1.7% of the population were Hispanic or Latino of any race. Of the 41,615 households 29.9% had children under the age of 18 living with them, 54.2% were married couples living together, 13.1% had a female householder with no husband present, and 29.2% were non-families. 26.3% of households were one person and 12.4% were one person aged 65 or older. The average household size was 2.44 and the average family size was 2.93.

The age distribution was 23.8% under the age of 18, 8.7% from 18 to 24, 27.4% from 25 to 44, 24.1% from 45 to 64, and 16.0% 65 or older. The median age was 38 years. For every 100 females, there were 91.80 males. For every 100 females age 18 and over, there were 87.90 males.

The median household income was $31,170 and the median family income was $38,697. Males had a median income of $31,610 versus $21,346 for females. The per capita income for the county was $16,783. About 12.3% of families and 15.7% of the population were below the poverty line, including 21.6% of those under age 18 and 13.7% of those age 65 or over.

== Government ==
Etowah County is reliably Republican at the presidential level. The last Democrat to win the county in a presidential election is Bill Clinton, who won it by a plurality in 1996.

United States presidential election results for Etowah County, Alabama
Year	Republican		Democratic		Third party(ies)	
Year	No.	%	No.	%	No.	%
1868	283	28.47%	711	71.53%	0	0.00%
1872	288	28.92%	708	71.08%	0	0.00%
1876	273	18.56%	1,198	81.44%	0	0.00%
1880	347	22.13%	1,217	77.61%	4	0.26%
1884	813	37.76%	1,313	60.98%	27	1.25%
1888	841	29.95%	1,912	68.09%	55	1.96%
1892	269	7.11%	2,225	58.85%	1,287	34.04%
1896	873	31.18%	1,782	63.64%	145	5.18%
1900	1,629	45.71%	1,734	48.65%	201	5.64%
1904	823	32.71%	1,431	56.88%	262	10.41%
1908	996	41.31%	1,309	54.29%	106	4.40%
1912	354	12.22%	1,511	52.18%	1,031	35.60%
1916	862	30.51%	1,883	66.65%	80	2.83%
1920	3,218	34.83%	5,917	64.05%	103	1.11%
1924	1,664	33.17%	3,081	61.41%	272	5.42%
1928	3,612	58.88%	2,484	40.50%	38	0.62%
1932	1,093	17.29%	5,167	81.73%	62	0.98%
1936	1,207	17.30%	5,739	82.24%	32	0.46%
1940	1,270	15.27%	7,012	84.33%	33	0.40%
1944	1,525	20.28%	5,895	78.38%	101	1.34%
1948	1,615	21.08%	0	0.00%	6,046	78.92%
1952	4,634	29.52%	10,997	70.06%	66	0.42%
1956	7,198	36.20%	12,374	62.22%	314	1.58%
1960	7,128	32.87%	14,372	66.28%	185	0.85%
1964	12,894	59.06%	0	0.00%	8,939	40.94%
1968	4,351	13.95%	4,613	14.79%	22,222	71.26%
1972	20,851	72.95%	7,372	25.79%	358	1.25%
1976	10,333	28.90%	25,020	69.99%	397	1.11%
1980	16,177	42.79%	20,790	54.99%	839	2.22%
1984	19,243	49.62%	19,074	49.18%	464	1.20%
1988	17,828	49.67%	17,762	49.49%	301	0.84%
1992	17,467	41.15%	20,558	48.43%	4,426	10.43%
1996	16,835	44.82%	17,976	47.86%	2,750	7.32%
2000	21,087	53.59%	17,433	44.30%	828	2.10%
2004	26,999	63.26%	15,328	35.91%	353	0.83%
2008	30,595	68.39%	13,497	30.17%	645	1.44%
2012	29,130	68.34%	12,803	30.04%	691	1.62%
2016	32,353	73.26%	10,442	23.64%	1,369	3.10%
2020	35,528	74.44%	11,567	24.24%	633	1.33%
2024	35,653	77.28%	10,027	21.73%	457	0.99%

United States Senate election results for Etowah County, Alabama2
Year	Republican		Democratic		Third party(ies)	
Year	No.	%	No.	%	No.	%
2020	34,351	72.18%	13,145	27.62%	93	0.20%

United States Senate election results for Etowah County, Alabama3
Year	Republican		Democratic		Third party(ies)	
Year	No.	%	No.	%	No.	%
2022	20,599	78.95%	4,925	18.88%	568	2.18%

Alabama Gubernatorial election results for Etowah County
Year	Republican		Democratic		Third party(ies)	
Year	No.	%	No.	%	No.	%
2022	20,685	79.20%	4,593	17.59%	840	3.22%

== Communities ==
=== Cities ===
- Attalla
- Boaz (partly in Marshall County)
- Gadsden (county seat)
- Glencoe (partly in Calhoun County)
- Hokes Bluff
- Rainbow City
- Southside (partly in Calhoun County)

=== Towns ===
- Altoona (partly in Blount County)
- Reece City
- Ridgeville
- Sardis City (partly in Marshall County)
- Walnut Grove

=== Census-designated places ===
- Ballplay
- Bristow Cove
- Carlisle-Rockledge
- Coats Bend
- Egypt
- Gallant
- Ivalee
- Lookout Mountain
- New Union
- Tidmore Bend
- Whitesboro

=== Unincorporated communities ===
- Anderson
- Keener
- Liberty Hill
- Mountainboro
- Pilgrims Rest

=== Former city ===
- Alabama City

== Education ==
The following school districts are in the county:

- Etowah County Schools (covers areas not in the city limits of Attala, Boaz, nor Gadsden)
- Attalla City School District
- Boaz City School District
- Gadsden City School District

Gadsden State Community College has a campus in the county.

== See also ==
- National Register of Historic Places listings in Etowah County, Alabama
- Properties on the Alabama Register of Landmarks and Heritage in Etowah County, Alabama
