= List of counties in Alabama =

Counties of Alabama
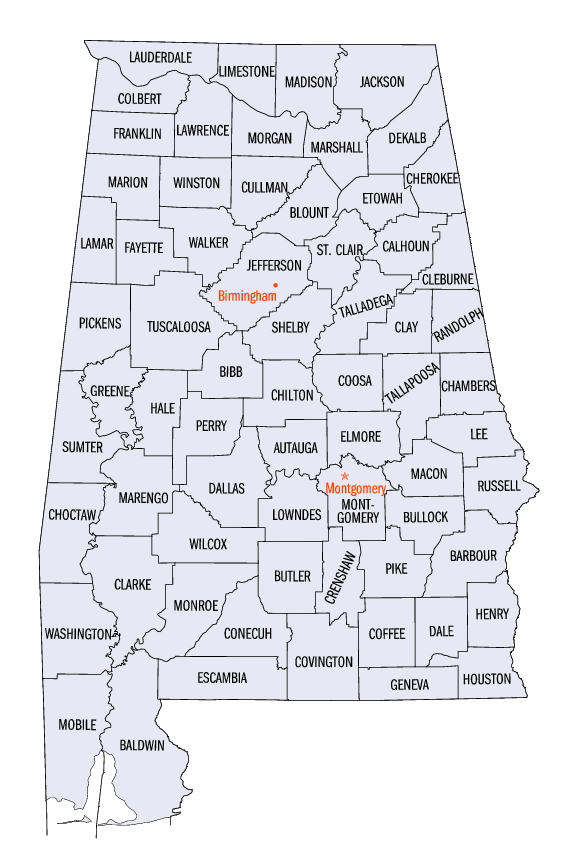
- Alabama counties (clickable map)
- Location: State of Alabama
- Number: 67
- Populations: Greatest: 665,742 (Jefferson); Least: 7,067 (Greene); Average: 77,509 (2025)
- Areas: Largest: 1,590 sq mi (4,100 km^{2}) (Baldwin); Smallest: 535 sq mi (1,390 km^{2}) (Etowah); Average: 782 sq mi (2,030 km^{2})
- Government: County government
- Subdivisions: Cities, towns, unincorporated communities, census-designated places

The U.S. state of Alabama has 67 counties. Each county serves as the local level of Alabama government within its borders. The land enclosed by the present state borders was joined to the United States of America gradually. Following the American Revolutionary War, West Florida was ceded to Spain by treaty while the remainder was organized primarily as the Mississippi Territory, and later the Alabama Territory. The territorial assembly established some of the earliest county divisions that have survived to the present, including the earliest county formation, that of Washington County, created on June 4, 1800. In 1814, the Treaty of Fort Jackson opened the territory to American settlers, which in turn led to a more rapid rate of county creation. Alabama was admitted to the Union as the 22nd state in 1819. The Alabama state legislature formed additional counties from former native lands as the Indian Removal Act took effect and settlers populated different areas of Alabama. In 1820, Alabama had 29 counties. By 1830 there were 36 and Native Americans still occupied large areas of land in northeast and far western Alabama. By 1840, 49 counties had been created; 52 by 1850; 65 by 1870; and the present 67 counties by 1903. Houston County was the last county created in the state, on February 9, 1903.

According to 2025 U.S. Census data, the average population of Alabama's 67 counties is 77,509, with Jefferson County as the most populous (665,742), and Greene County (7,067) the least. The average land area is 756 sq mi (1,958 km^{2}). The largest county is Baldwin (1,590 sq mi, 4,118 km^{2}) and the smallest is Etowah (535 sq mi, 1,386 km^{2}). The Constitution of Alabama requires that any new county in Alabama cover at least 600 square miles (1,600 km^{2}) in area, effectively limiting the creation of new counties in the state.

The Alabama Department of Revenue's Motor Vehicle Division issues standard automobile license plates that bear a one- or two-digit number identifying the county in which the vehicle is registered. This number is given in the fourth column in the table below. The first three prefixes are reserved for the state's historically most populous counties, and thereafter proceed alphabetically. Individual license plate numbers are assigned sequentially in each licensing office. The numbers are in the format XAA1111 or XXAA111, depending on whether the prefix is one or two digits. Overflow registrations are accommodated by substituting a letter for one of the registration numbers, such that XXZ999Z is followed by XXA0A0A.

The Federal Information Processing Standard (FIPS) code, used by the United States government to uniquely identify counties, is provided with each entry. The FIPS code links in the table point to U.S. Census "quick facts" pages for each county. Alabama's FIPS state code is 01.

== Counties ==
| County | FIPS code | County seat | License # | Est. | Formed from | Etymology | Density | Population (2025) | Land Area | Map |
|---|---|---|---|---|---|---|---|---|---|---|
| Autauga County | 001 | Prattville | 4 | November 21, 1818 | Montgomery County | The Autauga or Atagi people, Native Americans who were a sub-group of the Alibamu | 104.2 | 61,920 | 594.44 sq mi (1,540 km^{2}) | State map highlighting Autauga County |
| Baldwin County | 003 | Bay Minette | 5 | December 21, 1809 | Washington County and West Florida | Abraham Baldwin (1754–1807), U.S. legislator from Georgia | 168.4 | 267,761 | 1,589.78 sq mi (4,118 km^{2}) | State map highlighting Baldwin County |
| Barbour County | 005 | Clayton | 6 | December 18, 1832 | Pike County | James Barbour (1775–1842), Governor of Virginia and U.S. Senator | 27.8 | 24,607 | 884.88 sq mi (2,292 km^{2}) | State map highlighting Barbour County |
| Bibb County | 007 | Centreville | 7 | February 7, 1818 | Montgomery County (as Cahawba County) | William Wyatt Bibb (1781–1820), 1st Governor of Alabama | 35.8 | 22,262 | 622.58 sq mi (1,612 km^{2}) | State map highlighting Bibb County |
| Blount County | 009 | Oneonta | 8 | February 6, 1818 | Montgomery County and Creek territories | Willie Blount (1768–1835), Governor of Tennessee | 93.3 | 60,156 | 644.78 sq mi (1,670 km^{2}) | State map highlighting Blount County |
| Bullock County | 011 | Union Springs | 9 | December 5, 1866 | Barbour, Macon, Montgomery, and Pike counties | Edward Bullock (1822–1861), colonel in the Confederate States Army | 15.7 | 9,780 | 622.80 sq mi (1,613 km^{2}) | State map highlighting Bullock County |
| Butler County | 013 | Greenville | 10 | December 13, 1819 | Conecuh and Monroe counties | William Butler (1759–1818), captain in Creek War | 23.3 | 18,100 | 776.83 sq mi (2,012 km^{2}) | State map highlighting Butler County |
| Calhoun County | 015 | Anniston | 11 | December 18, 1832 | St. Clair County (as Benton County) | John C. Calhoun (1782–1850), 7th U.S. Vice President | 191.2 | 115,834 | 605.87 sq mi (1,569 km^{2}) | State map highlighting Calhoun County |
| Chambers County | 017 | LaFayette | 12 | December 18, 1832 | Montgomery County | Henry H. Chambers (1790–1826), U.S. Senator | 57.4 | 34,253 | 596.53 sq mi (1,545 km^{2}) | State map highlighting Chambers County |
| Cherokee County | 019 | Centre | 13 | January 9, 1836 | Cherokee territory | Cherokee people, whose lands included Northeast Alabama | 47.7 | 26,413 | 553.70 sq mi (1,434 km^{2}) | State map highlighting Cherokee County |
| Chilton County | 021 | Clanton | 14 | December 30, 1868 | Autauga, Bibb, Perry, and Shelby counties (as Baker County) | William Parish Chilton (1810–1871), Alabama Supreme Court Justice and Confederate congressman | 68.9 | 47,708 | 692.85 sq mi (1,794 km^{2}) | State map highlighting Chilton County |
| Choctaw County | 023 | Butler | 15 | December 29, 1847 | Sumter and Washington counties | Choctaw people, whose lands included Alabama | 13.0 | 11,904 | 913.50 sq mi (2,366 km^{2}) | State map highlighting Choctaw County |
| Clarke County | 025 | Grove Hill | 16 | December 10, 1812 | Washington County | John Clarke (1766–1832), general from Georgia | 17.8 | 22,014 | 1,238.46 sq mi (3,208 km^{2}) | State map highlighting Clarke County |
| Clay County | 027 | Ashland | 17 | December 7, 1866 | Randolph and Talladega counties | Henry Clay (1777–1852), U.S. legislator from Kentucky | 23.5 | 14,207 | 603.96 sq mi (1,564 km^{2}) | State map highlighting Clay County |
| Cleburne County | 029 | Heflin | 18 | December 6, 1866 | Calhoun, Randolph, and Talladega counties | Patrick Cleburne (1828–1864), Major General in Confederate States Army | 28.5 | 15,970 | 560.10 sq mi (1,451 km^{2}) | State map highlighting Cleburne County |
| Coffee County | 031 | Elba and Enterprise | 19 | December 29, 1841 | Dale County | John Coffee (1772–1833), military leader in War of 1812 and Creek War | 83.9 | 56,953 | 678.97 sq mi (1,759 km^{2}) | State map highlighting Coffee County |
| Colbert County | 033 | Tuscumbia | 20 | February 6, 1867 | Franklin County | George Colbert (1764–1839) and Levi Colbert (1759–1834), Chickasaw chiefs | 100.4 | 59,474 | 592.62 sq mi (1,535 km^{2}) | State map highlighting Colbert County |
| Conecuh County | 035 | Evergreen | 21 | February 13, 1818 | Monroe County | The Conecuh River, which flows through the county | 12.8 | 10,899 | 850.16 sq mi (2,202 km^{2}) | State map highlighting Conecuh County |
| Coosa County | 037 | Rockford | 22 | December 18, 1832 | Montgomery County | The Coosa River, which flows through the county, and is itself named after a Native American village | 15.6 | 10,161 | 650.93 sq mi (1,686 km^{2}) | State map highlighting Coosa County |
| Covington County | 039 | Andalusia | 23 | December 7, 1821 | Henry County | Leonard Covington (1768–1813), Brigadier General in War of 1812 and U.S. Congressman | 36.8 | 37,947 | 1,030.46 sq mi (2,669 km^{2}) | State map highlighting Covington County |
| Crenshaw County | 041 | Luverne | 24 | November 24, 1866 | Butler, Coffee, Covington, Lowndes, and Pike Counties | Anderson Crenshaw (1783–1847), Alabama Supreme Court justice and early settler | 21.6 | 13,175 | 608.84 sq mi (1,577 km^{2}) | State map highlighting Crenshaw County |
| Cullman County | 043 | Cullman | 25 | January 24, 1877 | Blount, Morgan, and Winston counties | Colonel John G. Cullmann (1823–1895), founder of county seat | 127.9 | 94,009 | 734.84 sq mi (1,903 km^{2}) | State map highlighting Cullman County |
| Dale County | 045 | Ozark | 26 | October 17, 1825 | Covington and Henry counties | Samuel Dale (1772–1841), Brigadier General and state legislator | 88.9 | 49,912 | 561.15 sq mi (1,453 km^{2}) | State map highlighting Dale County |
| Dallas County | 047 | Selma | 27 | February 9, 1818 | Monroe and Montgomery counties | Alexander James Dallas (1759–1817), U.S. Secretary of Treasury | 35.9 | 35,140 | 978.69 sq mi (2,535 km^{2}) | State map highlighting Dallas County |
| DeKalb County | 049 | Fort Payne | 28 | January 9, 1836 | Cherokee territory | Johann de Kalb (1721–1780), major general in American Revolutionary War | 95.3 | 74,085 | 777.09 sq mi (2,013 km^{2}) | State map highlighting DeKalb County |
| Elmore County | 051 | Wetumpka | 29 | December 31, 1866 | Autauga, Coosa, Montgomery, and Tallapoosa counties | John Archer Elmore (1762–1834), Revolutionary War veteran | 148.1 | 91,577 | 618.48 sq mi (1,602 km^{2}) | State map highlighting Elmore County |
| Escambia County | 053 | Brewton | 30 | December 10, 1868 | Baldwin and Conecuh counties | Escambia Creek, a tributary of the Conecuh River | 38.8 | 36,665 | 945.08 sq mi (2,448 km^{2}) | State map highlighting Escambia County |
| Etowah County | 055 | Gadsden | 31 | December 1, 1868 | Blount, Calhoun, Cherokee, DeKalb, Marshall, and St. Clair counties (as Baine County) | Etowah Indian Mounds | 194.2 | 103,886 | 534.99 sq mi (1,386 km^{2}) | State map highlighting Etowah County |
| Fayette County | 057 | Fayette | 32 | December 20, 1824 | Marion, Pickens, Tuscaloosa, and Walker counties | Gilbert du Motier, marquis de La Fayette (1757–1834), Revolutionary War commander | 25.3 | 15,872 | 627.66 sq mi (1,626 km^{2}) | State map highlighting Fayette County |
| Franklin County | 059 | Russellville | 33 | February 6, 1818 | Cherokee territory | Benjamin Franklin (1706–1790), politician, diplomat, inventor, and publisher | 51.2 | 32,449 | 633.82 sq mi (1,642 km^{2}) | State map highlighting Franklin County |
| Geneva County | 061 | Geneva | 34 | December 26, 1868 | Coffee, Dale, and Henry counties | Named after Geneva, New York, the origin of several early settlers | 48.0 | 27,554 | 574.41 sq mi (1,488 km^{2}) | State map highlighting Geneva County |
| Greene County | 063 | Eutaw | 35 | December 13, 1819 | Marengo and Tuscaloosa counties | Nathanael Greene (1742–1786), Revolutionary War general | 10.9 | 7,067 | 647.11 sq mi (1,676 km^{2}) | State map highlighting Greene County |
| Hale County | 065 | Greensboro | 36 | January 30, 1867 | Greene, Marengo, Perry, and Tuscaloosa counties | Stephen F. Hale (1816–1862), lieutenant colonel in Confederate States Army | 23.6 | 15,194 | 643.94 sq mi (1,668 km^{2}) | State map highlighting Hale County |
| Henry County | 067 | Abbeville | 37 | December 13, 1819 | Conecuh County | Patrick Henry (1736–1799), Revolutionary War patriot and Governor of Virginia | 32.7 | 18,394 | 561.75 sq mi (1,455 km^{2}) | State map highlighting Henry County |
| Houston County | 069 | Dothan | 38 | February 9, 1903 | Dale, Geneva, and Henry counties | George S. Houston (1811–1879), 24th Governor of Alabama and U.S. Congressman | 190.3 | 110,318 | 579.82 sq mi (1,502 km^{2}) | State map highlighting Houston County |
| Jackson County | 071 | Scottsboro | 39 | December 13, 1819 | Cherokee territory | Andrew Jackson (1767–1845), 7th U.S. President | 50.4 | 54,281 | 1,077.87 sq mi (2,792 km^{2}) | State map highlighting Jackson County |
| Jefferson County | 073 | Birmingham | 1 | December 13, 1819 | Blount County | Thomas Jefferson (1743–1826), 3rd U.S. President | 599.1 | 665,742 | 1,111.28 sq mi (2,878 km^{2}) | State map highlighting Jefferson County |
| Lamar County | 075 | Vernon | 40 | October 8, 1868 | Fayette and Marion counties (as Jones County) | Lucius Q. C. Lamar (1825–1893), U.S. Supreme Court justice | 22.5 | 13,587 | 604.85 sq mi (1,567 km^{2}) | State map highlighting Lamar County |
| Lauderdale County | 077 | Florence | 41 | February 6, 1818 | Cherokee and Chickasaw territories | James Lauderdale (1780–1814), Colonel in War of 1812 | 145.5 | 97,135 | 667.70 sq mi (1,729 km^{2}) | State map highlighting Lauderdale County |
| Lawrence County | 079 | Moulton | 42 | February 6, 1818 | Cherokee territory | James Lawrence (1781–1813), naval officer in War of 1812 | 49.0 | 33,843 | 690.68 sq mi (1,789 km^{2}) | State map highlighting Lawrence County |
| Lee County | 081 | Opelika | 43 | December 5, 1866 | Chambers, Macon, Russell, and Tallapoosa counties | Robert E. Lee (1807–1870), Commander of the Confederate States Army | 312.5 | 189,881 | 607.54 sq mi (1,574 km^{2}) | State map highlighting Lee County |
| Limestone County | 083 | Athens | 44 | February 6, 1818 | Elk and Madison counties | Limestone Creek, named for local geological deposits | 219.5 | 122,928 | 559.94 sq mi (1,450 km^{2}) | State map highlighting Limestone County |
| Lowndes County | 085 | Hayneville | 45 | January 20, 1830 | Butler, Dallas, and Montgomery counties | William Lowndes (1782–1822), U.S. Congressman from South Carolina | 13.1 | 9,359 | 715.91 sq mi (1,854 km^{2}) | State map highlighting Lowndes County |
| Macon County | 087 | Tuskegee | 46 | December 18, 1832 | Montgomery County | Nathaniel Macon (1758–1837), U.S. legislator from North Carolina | 29.8 | 18,132 | 608.89 sq mi (1,577 km^{2}) | State map highlighting Macon County |
| Madison County | 089 | Huntsville | 47 | December 13, 1808 | Cherokee and Chickasaw territories | James Madison (1751–1836), 4th U.S. President | 540.8 | 433,516 | 801.59 sq mi (2,076 km^{2}) | State map highlighting Madison County |
| Marengo County | 091 | Linden | 48 | February 6, 1818 | Choctaw territory | Battle of Marengo | 18.7 | 18,311 | 976.88 sq mi (2,530 km^{2}) | State map highlighting Marengo County |
| Marion County | 093 | Hamilton | 49 | February 13, 1818 | Tuscaloosa County | Francis Marion (1732–1795), military leader in American Revolutionary War | 39.2 | 29,097 | 742.29 sq mi (1,923 km^{2}) | State map highlighting Marion County |
| Marshall County | 095 | Guntersville | 50 | January 9, 1836 | Blount and Jackson counties and Cherokee territory | John Marshall (1755–1835), Chief Justice of the United States 1801–1835 | 183.0 | 103,537 | 565.84 sq mi (1,466 km^{2}) | State map highlighting Marshall County |
| Mobile County | 097 | Mobile | 2 | August 1, 1812 | Mobile District of West Florida after annexation into Mississippi Territory | Mobile Bay, on which county is located, and which is itself named after the Maubila tribe of Native Americans | 334.8 | 411,658 | 1,229.44 sq mi (3,184 km^{2}) | State map highlighting Mobile County |
| Monroe County | 099 | Monroeville | 51 | June 29, 1815 | Creek territory | James Monroe (1758–1831), 5th U.S. President | 18.5 | 18,965 | 1,025.67 sq mi (2,656 km^{2}) | State map highlighting Monroe County |
| Montgomery County | 101 | Montgomery | 3 | December 6, 1816 | Monroe County | Lemuel P. Montgomery (1786–1814), Major in Creek War | 288.0 | 225,891 | 784.25 sq mi (2,031 km^{2}) | State map highlighting Montgomery County |
| Morgan County | 103 | Decatur | 52 | February 6, 1818 | Cherokee territory (as Cotaco County) | Daniel Morgan (1736–1802), U.S. Congressman | 218.3 | 126,483 | 579.34 sq mi (1,500 km^{2}) | State map highlighting Morgan County |
| Perry County | 105 | Marion | 53 | December 13, 1819 | Cahawba, Dallas, Marengo, and Tuscaloosa counties | Oliver Hazard Perry (1795–1819), naval officer in War of 1812 | 10.3 | 7,425 | 719.66 sq mi (1,864 km^{2}) | State map highlighting Perry County |
| Pickens County | 107 | Carrollton | 54 | December 19, 1820 | Tuscaloosa County | Andrew Pickens (1739–1817), General in the Revolutionary War | 20.7 | 18,221 | 881.41 sq mi (2,283 km^{2}) | State map highlighting Pickens County |
| Pike County | 109 | Troy | 55 | December 7, 1821 | Henry and Montgomery counties | Zebulon Pike (1779–1813), explorer and officer in War of 1812 | 50.1 | 33,688 | 672.09 sq mi (1,741 km^{2}) | State map highlighting Pike County |
| Randolph County | 111 | Wedowee | 56 | December 18, 1832 | St. Clair and Shelby counties | John Randolph (1773–1833), U.S. Senator from Virginia | 39.9 | 23,163 | 580.55 sq mi (1,504 km^{2}) | State map highlighting Randolph County |
| Russell County | 113 | Phenix City | 57 | December 18, 1832 | Barbour, Bullock, Lee and Macon counties | Gilbert C. Russell (1782–1861), officer in Creek War | 91.9 | 58,898 | 641.14 sq mi (1,661 km^{2}) | State map highlighting Russell County |
| St. Clair County | 115 | Ashville and Pell City | 59 | November 20, 1818 | Shelby County | Arthur St. Clair (1736–1818), President of Continental Congress | 155.4 | 98,206 | 631.90 sq mi (1,637 km^{2}) | State map highlighting St. Clair County |
| Shelby County | 117 | Columbiana | 58 | February 7, 1818 | Montgomery County | Isaac Shelby (1750–1826), Governor of Kentucky | 303.9 | 238,552 | 784.93 sq mi (2,033 km^{2}) | State map highlighting Shelby County |
| Sumter County | 119 | Livingston | 60 | December 18, 1832 | Choctaw territory | Thomas Sumter (1734–1832), U.S. Congressman from South Carolina | 12.8 | 11,588 | 903.89 sq mi (2,341 km^{2}) | State map highlighting Sumter County |
| Talladega County | 121 | Talladega | 61 | December 18, 1832 | St. Clair and Shelby counties | Talatigi, Creek Indian name for the county seat, meaning "border town" | 110.8 | 81,603 | 736.78 sq mi (1,908 km^{2}) | State map highlighting Talladega County |
| Tallapoosa County | 123 | Dadeville | 62 | December 18, 1832 | Montgomery and Shelby counties | Tallapoosa River | 57.2 | 40,953 | 716.52 sq mi (1,856 km^{2}) | State map highlighting Tallapoosa County |
| Tuscaloosa County | 125 | Tuscaloosa | 63 | February 6, 1818 | Montgomery County and Choctaw territory | Indigenous name for the Black Warrior River | 182.6 | 241,368 | 1,321.75 sq mi (3,423 km^{2}) | State map highlighting Tuscaloosa County |
| Walker County | 127 | Jasper | 64 | December 26, 1823 | Blount, Jefferson, and Tuscaloosa counties | John Williams Walker (1783–1823), U.S. Senator from Alabama | 82.3 | 65,140 | 791.19 sq mi (2,049 km^{2}) | State map highlighting Walker County |
| Washington County | 129 | Chatom | 65 | June 2, 1800 | Adams and Pickering counties of Mississippi Territory | George Washington (1732–1799), 1st U.S. President | 13.7 | 14,822 | 1,080.21 sq mi (2,798 km^{2}) | State map highlighting Washington County |
| Wilcox County | 131 | Camden | 66 | December 13, 1819 | Dallas and Monroe counties | Joseph M. Wilcox (1790–1814), lieutenant in Creek War | 10.9 | 9,666 | 888.50 sq mi (2,301 km^{2}) | State map highlighting Wilcox County |
| Winston County | 133 | Double Springs | 67 | February 12, 1850 | Walker County (as Hancock County) | John A. Winston (1812–1871), 15th Governor of Alabama | 38.9 | 23,829 | 612.98 sq mi (1,588 km^{2}) | State map highlighting Winston County |

== Racial / Ethnic Profile of counties in Alabama (2020 Census) ==
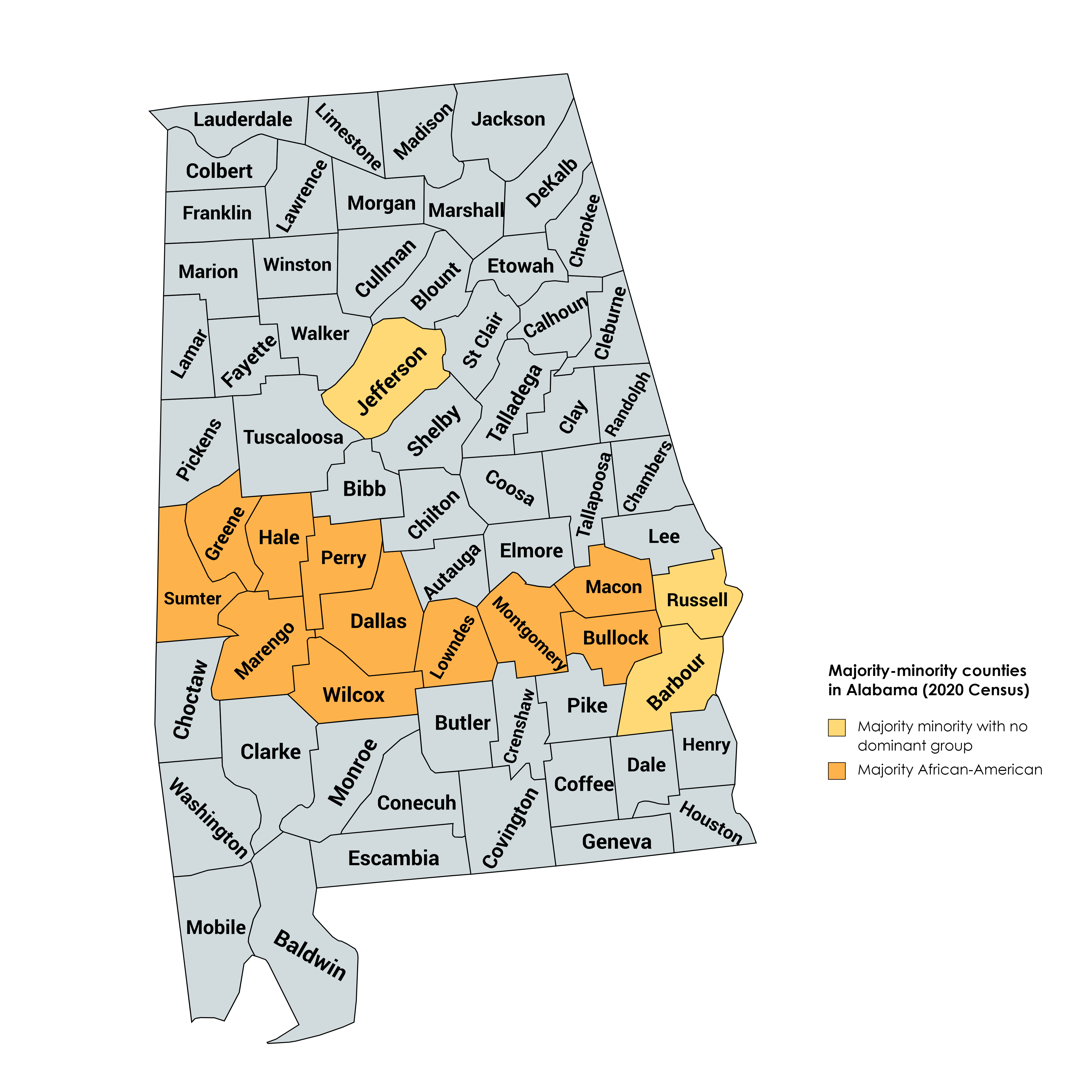
Majority-minority counties in Alabama derived from the 2020 U.S. census

Racial / Ethnic Profile of counties in Alabama (2020 Census)
Following is a table of counties in Alabama by race/ethnicity. The majority racial/ethnic group is coded per the key below.

| Majority minority with no dominant group |
| Majority White |
| Majority Black |
| Majority Hispanic |
| Majority Asian |

Racial and ethnic composition of counties in Alabama (2020 Census) (NH = Non-Hispanic) Note: the US Census treats Hispanic/Latino as an ethnic category. This table excludes Latinos from the racial categories and assigns them to a separate category. Hispanics/Latinos may be of any race.
| County | Location of County | Total Population | White alone (NH) | % | Black or African American alone (NH) | % | Native American or Alaska Native alone (NH) | % | Asian alone (NH) | % | Pacific Islander alone (NH) | % | Other race alone (NH) | % | Mixed race or Multiracial (NH) | % | Hispanic or Latino (any race) | % |
|---|---|---|---|---|---|---|---|---|---|---|---|---|---|---|---|---|---|---|
| Autauga | | 58,805 | 41,582 | 70.71% | 11,352 | 19.30% | 184 | 0.31% | 873 | 1.48% | 22 | 0.04% | 185 | 0.31% | 2,490 | 4.23% | 2,117 | 3.60% |
| Baldwin | | 231,767 | 186,495 | 80.47% | 18,001 | 7.77% | 1,291 | 0.56% | 2,029 | 0.88% | 122 | 0.05% | 775 | 0.33% | 10,368 | 4.47% | 12,686 | 5.47% |
| Barbour | | 25,223 | 11,086 | 43.95% | 11,850 | 47.00% | 58 | 0.23% | 103 | 0.41% | 0 | 0.00% | 63 | 0.25% | 553 | 2.19% | 1,510 | 5.99% |
| Bibb | | 22,293 | 16,442 | 73.75% | 4,390 | 19.69% | 39 | 0.17% | 26 | 0.12% | 9 | 0.04% | 47 | 0.21% | 600 | 2.69% | 740 | 3.32% |
| Blount | | 59,134 | 49,764 | 84.15% | 826 | 1.40% | 188 | 0.32% | 174 | 0.29% | 11 | 0.02% | 100 | 0.17% | 2,300 | 3.89% | 5,771 | 9.76% |
| Bullock | | 10,357 | 2,281 | 22.02% | 7,388 | 71.33% | 1 | 0.01% | 9 | 0.09% | 7 | 0.07% | 31 | 0.30% | 137 | 1.32% | 503 | 4.86% |
| Butler | | 19,051 | 9,679 | 50.81% | 8,389 | 44.03% | 23 | 0.12% | 143 | 0.75% | 5 | 0.03% | 46 | 0.24% | 506 | 2.66% | 260 | 1.36% |
| Calhoun | | 116,441 | 79,519 | 68.29% | 25,365 | 21.78% | 386 | 0.33% | 1,164 | 1.00% | 112 | 0.10% | 317 | 0.27% | 4,568 | 3.92% | 5,010 | 4.30% |
| Chambers | | 34,772 | 18,616 | 53.54% | 13,441 | 38.65% | 71 | 0.20% | 385 | 1.11% | 11 | 0.03% | 115 | 0.33% | 896 | 2.58% | 1,237 | 3.56% |
| Cherokee | | 24,971 | 22,563 | 90.36% | 987 | 3.95% | 109 | 0.44% | 55 | 0.22% | 1 | 0.00% | 46 | 0.18% | 810 | 3.24% | 400 | 1.60% |
| Chilton | | 45,014 | 34,878 | 77.48% | 4,040 | 8.97% | 112 | 0.25% | 176 | 0.39% | 5 | 0.01% | 121 | 0.27% | 1,264 | 2.81% | 4,418 | 9.81% |
| Choctaw | | 12,665 | 7,039 | 55.58% | 5,217 | 41.19% | 24 | 0.19% | 19 | 0.15% | 0 | 0.00% | 13 | 0.10% | 240 | 1.89% | 113 | 0.89% |
| Clarke | | 23,087 | 11,970 | 51.85% | 10,223 | 44.28% | 74 | 0.32% | 91 | 0.39% | 1 | 0.00% | 37 | 0.16% | 485 | 2.10% | 206 | 0.89% |
| Clay | | 14,236 | 11,261 | 79.10% | 1,942 | 13.64% | 45 | 0.32% | 46 | 0.32% | 4 | 0.03% | 26 | 0.18% | 463 | 3.25% | 449 | 3.15% |
| Cleburne | | 15,056 | 13,740 | 91.26% | 457 | 3.03% | 42 | 0.28% | 21 | 0.14% | 2 | 0.01% | 16 | 0.11% | 494 | 3.28% | 284 | 1.89% |
| Coffee | | 53,465 | 35,759 | 66.88% | 8,643 | 16.17% | 405 | 0.76% | 892 | 1.67% | 57 | 0.11% | 195 | 0.36% | 2,627 | 4.91% | 4,887 | 9.14% |
| Colbert | | 57,227 | 43,241 | 75.56% | 9,222 | 16.11% | 223 | 0.39% | 432 | 0.75% | 9 | 0.02% | 135 | 0.24% | 2,233 | 3.90% | 1,732 | 3.03% |
| Conecuh | | 11,597 | 5,835 | 50.31% | 5,096 | 43.94% | 71 | 0.61% | 33 | 0.28% | 0 | 0.00% | 16 | 0.14% | 290 | 2.50% | 256 | 2.21% |
| Coosa | | 10,387 | 6,807 | 65.53% | 3,000 | 28.88% | 25 | 0.24% | 8 | 0.08% | 0 | 0.00% | 47 | 0.45% | 299 | 2.88% | 201 | 1.94% |
| Covington | | 37,570 | 30,657 | 81.60% | 4,563 | 12.15% | 140 | 0.37% | 240 | 0.64% | 0 | 0.00% | 71 | 0.19% | 1,245 | 3.31% | 654 | 1.74% |
| Crenshaw | | 13,194 | 9,333 | 70.74% | 3,085 | 23.38% | 48 | 0.36% | 83 | 0.63% | 2 | 0.02% | 27 | 0.20% | 429 | 3.25% | 187 | 1.42% |
| Cullman | | 87,866 | 78,298 | 89.11% | 914 | 1.04% | 287 | 0.33% | 522 | 0.59% | 64 | 0.07% | 151 | 0.17% | 3,484 | 3.97% | 4,146 | 4.72% |
| Dale | | 49,326 | 32,602 | 66.09% | 10,100 | 20.48% | 217 | 0.44% | 648 | 1.31% | 42 | 0.09% | 164 | 0.33% | 2,299 | 4.66% | 3,254 | 6.60% |
| Dallas | | 38,462 | 10,363 | 26.94% | 26,812 | 69.71% | 56 | 0.15% | 145 | 0.38% | 12 | 0.03% | 38 | 0.10% | 740 | 1.92% | 296 | 0.77% |
| DeKalb | | 71,608 | 54,529 | 76.15% | 1,019 | 1.42% | 715 | 1.00% | 237 | 0.33% | 16 | 0.02% | 86 | 0.12% | 3,262 | 4.56% | 11,744 | 16.40% |
| Elmore | | 87,977 | 62,540 | 71.09% | 18,126 | 20.60% | 270 | 0.31% | 669 | 0.76% | 28 | 0.03% | 275 | 0.31% | 3,276 | 3.72% | 2,793 | 3.17% |
| Escambia | | 36,757 | 22,004 | 59.86% | 10,922 | 29.71% | 1,488 | 4.05% | 108 | 0.29% | 22 | 0.06% | 49 | 0.13% | 1,413 | 3.84% | 751 | 2.04% |
| Etowah | | 103,436 | 77,731 | 75.15% | 14,999 | 14.50% | 332 | 0.32% | 921 | 0.89% | 39 | 0.04% | 260 | 0.25% | 4,259 | 4.12% | 4,895 | 4.73% |
| Fayette | | 16,321 | 13,552 | 83.03% | 1,720 | 10.54% | 43 | 0.26% | 49 | 0.30% | 1 | 0.01% | 29 | 0.18% | 531 | 3.25% | 396 | 2.43% |
| Franklin | | 32,113 | 23,581 | 73.43% | 1,139 | 3.55% | 128 | 0.40% | 67 | 0.21% | 2 | 0.01% | 77 | 0.24% | 860 | 2.68% | 6,259 | 19.49% |
| Geneva | | 26,659 | 21,654 | 81.23% | 2,231 | 8.37% | 166 | 0.62% | 86 | 0.32% | 7 | 0.03% | 72 | 0.27% | 1,147 | 4.30% | 1,296 | 4.86% |
| Greene | | 7,730 | 1,285 | 16.62% | 6,227 | 80.56% | 5 | 0.06% | 7 | 0.09% | 0 | 0.00% | 11 | 0.14% | 134 | 1.73% | 61 | 0.79% |
| Hale | | 14,785 | 5,972 | 40.39% | 8,313 | 56.23% | 34 | 0.23% | 18 | 0.12% | 5 | 0.03% | 23 | 0.16% | 271 | 1.83% | 149 | 1.01% |
| Henry | | 17,146 | 11,842 | 69.07% | 4,232 | 24.68% | 50 | 0.29% | 73 | 0.43% | 0 | 0.00% | 49 | 0.29% | 566 | 3.30% | 334 | 1.95% |
| Houston | | 107,202 | 68,251 | 63.67% | 28,232 | 26.34% | 321 | 0.30% | 1,260 | 1.18% | 59 | 0.06% | 354 | 0.33% | 4,244 | 3.96% | 4,481 | 4.18% |
| Jackson | | 52,579 | 45,123 | 85.82% | 1,624 | 3.09% | 680 | 1.29% | 214 | 0.41% | 2 | 0.00% | 109 | 0.21% | 3,146 | 5.98% | 1,681 | 3.20% |
| Jefferson | | 674,721 | 324,252 | 48.06% | 280,112 | 41.51% | 1,207 | 0.18% | 13,043 | 1.93% | 311 | 0.05% | 1,966 | 0.29% | 18,974 | 2.81% | 34,856 | 5.17% |
| Lamar | | 13,972 | 11,924 | 85.34% | 1,421 | 10.17% | 28 | 0.20% | 6 | 0.04% | 3 | 0.02% | 22 | 0.16% | 360 | 2.58% | 208 | 1.49% |
| Lauderdale | | 93,564 | 76,491 | 81.75% | 9,164 | 9.79% | 295 | 0.32% | 748 | 0.80% | 31 | 0.03% | 204 | 0.22% | 3,553 | 3.80% | 3,078 | 3.29% |
| Lawrence | | 33,073 | 24,714 | 74.73% | 3,302 | 9.98% | 1,440 | 4.35% | 84 | 0.25% | 7 | 0.02% | 69 | 0.21% | 2,562 | 7.75% | 895 | 2.71% |
| Lee | | 174,241 | 109,795 | 63.01% | 39,252 | 22.53% | 365 | 0.21% | 8,544 | 4.90% | 108 | 0.06% | 462 | 0.27% | 6,580 | 3.78% | 9,135 | 5.24% |
| Limestone | | 103,570 | 75,692 | 73.08% | 13,177 | 12.72% | 458 | 0.44% | 1,857 | 1.79% | 70 | 0.07% | 319 | 0.31% | 4,749 | 4.59% | 7,248 | 7.00% |
| Lowndes | | 10,311 | 2,807 | 27.22% | 7,149 | 69.33% | 9 | 0.09% | 15 | 0.15% | 0 | 0.00% | 5 | 0.05% | 186 | 1.80% | 140 | 1.36% |
| Macon | | 19,532 | 3,187 | 16.32% | 15,395 | 78.82% | 48 | 0.25% | 74 | 0.38% | 4 | 0.02% | 45 | 0.23% | 418 | 2.14% | 361 | 1.85% |
| Madison | | 388,153 | 237,497 | 61.19% | 91,079 | 23.46% | 2,132 | 0.55% | 10,179 | 2.62% | 450 | 0.12% | 1,702 | 0.44% | 20,178 | 5.20% | 24,936 | 6.42% |
| Marengo | | 19,323 | 8,375 | 43.34% | 10,133 | 52.44% | 6 | 0.03% | 54 | 0.28% | 1 | 0.01% | 41 | 0.21% | 345 | 1.79% | 368 | 1.90% |
| Marion | | 29,341 | 26,093 | 88.93% | 1,094 | 3.73% | 82 | 0.28% | 75 | 0.26% | 14 | 0.05% | 43 | 0.15% | 1,077 | 3.67% | 863 | 2.94% |
| Marshall | | 97,612 | 74,666 | 76.49% | 2,293 | 2.35% | 418 | 0.43% | 579 | 0.59% | 128 | 0.13% | 199 | 0.20% | 3,671 | 3.76% | 15,658 | 16.04% |
| Mobile | | 414,809 | 226,703 | 54.65% | 145,435 | 35.06% | 3,743 | 0.90% | 8,515 | 2.05% | 216 | 0.05% | 1,302 | 0.31% | 15,470 | 3.73% | 13,425 | 3.24% |
| Monroe | | 19,772 | 10,334 | 52.27% | 8,253 | 41.74% | 281 | 1.42% | 88 | 0.45% | 0 | 0.00% | 44 | 0.22% | 565 | 2.86% | 207 | 1.05% |
| Montgomery | | 228,954 | 73,354 | 32.04% | 129,801 | 56.69% | 364 | 0.16% | 7,952 | 3.47% | 119 | 0.05% | 722 | 0.32% | 5,958 | 2.60% | 10,684 | 4.67% |
| Morgan | | 123,421 | 88,238 | 71.49% | 15,307 | 12.40% | 631 | 0.51% | 829 | 0.67% | 79 | 0.06% | 376 | 0.30% | 5,584 | 4.52% | 12,377 | 10.03% |
| Perry | | 8,511 | 2,345 | 27.55% | 5,914 | 69.49% | 15 | 0.18% | 10 | 0.12% | 1 | 0.01% | 0 | 0.00% | 137 | 1.61% | 89 | 1.05% |
| Pickens | | 19,123 | 10,066 | 52.64% | 7,448 | 38.95% | 23 | 0.12% | 78 | 0.41% | 0 | 0.00% | 12 | 0.06% | 443 | 2.32% | 1,053 | 5.51% |
| Pike | | 33,009 | 18,036 | 54.64% | 12,068 | 36.56% | 169 | 0.51% | 577 | 1.75% | 9 | 0.03% | 117 | 0.35% | 1,128 | 3.42% | 905 | 2.74% |
| Randolph | | 21,967 | 16,629 | 75.70% | 3,814 | 17.36% | 50 | 0.23% | 86 | 0.39% | 1 | 0.00% | 51 | 0.23% | 731 | 3.33% | 605 | 2.75% |
| Russell | | 59,183 | 26,679 | 45.08% | 25,930 | 43.81% | 180 | 0.30% | 408 | 0.69% | 128 | 0.22% | 234 | 0.40% | 2,429 | 4.10% | 3,195 | 5.40% |
| St. Clair | | 91,103 | 74,962 | 82.28% | 8,617 | 9.46% | 249 | 0.27% | 655 | 0.72% | 20 | 0.02% | 234 | 0.26% | 3,791 | 4.16% | 2,575 | 2.83% |
| Shelby | | 223,024 | 162,712 | 72.96% | 28,711 | 12.87% | 478 | 0.21% | 5,114 | 2.29% | 91 | 0.04% | 798 | 0.36% | 8,660 | 3.88% | 16,460 | 7.38% |
| Sumter | | 12,345 | 2,937 | 23.79% | 8,955 | 72.54% | 26 | 0.21% | 102 | 0.83% | 3 | 0.02% | 9 | 0.07% | 182 | 1.47% | 131 | 1.06% |
| Talladega | | 82,149 | 50,732 | 61.76% | 26,340 | 32.06% | 184 | 0.22% | 395 | 0.48% | 27 | 0.03% | 206 | 0.25% | 2,486 | 3.03% | 1,779 | 2.17% |
| Tallapoosa | | 41,311 | 28,252 | 68.39% | 10,366 | 25.09% | 84 | 0.20% | 222 | 0.54% | 0 | 0.00% | 91 | 0.22% | 1,152 | 2.79% | 1,144 | 2.77% |
| Tuscaloosa | | 227,036 | 134,880 | 59.41% | 68,779 | 30.29% | 420 | 0.18% | 3,241 | 1.43% | 94 | 0.04% | 792 | 0.35% | 6,532 | 2.88% | 12,298 | 5.42% |
| Walker | | 65,342 | 56,394 | 86.31% | 3,889 | 5.95% | 187 | 0.29% | 283 | 0.43% | 2 | 0.00% | 136 | 0.21% | 2,299 | 3.52% | 2,152 | 3.29% |
| Washington | | 15,388 | 10,267 | 66.72% | 3,318 | 21.56% | 1,102 | 7.16% | 14 | 0.09% | 2 | 0.01% | 23 | 0.15% | 524 | 3.40% | 138 | 0.90% |
| Wilcox | | 10,600 | 2,866 | 27.04% | 7,425 | 70.05% | 11 | 0.10% | 7 | 0.07% | 5 | 0.05% | 16 | 0.15% | 158 | 1.49% | 112 | 1.06% |
| Winston | | 23,540 | 21,598 | 91.75% | 131 | 0.56% | 83 | 0.35% | 58 | 0.25% | 9 | 0.04% | 39 | 0.17% | 807 | 3.43% | 815 | 3.46% |

== Former county names ==
| County | Named for | Changed to |
|---|---|---|
| Baine County | David W. Baine, Colonel in the Civil War | Etowah County in 1868 |
| Baker County | Alfred Baker, a local landowner | Chilton County in 1874 |
| Benton County | Thomas Hart Benton, U.S. Senator from Missouri | Calhoun County in 1858, honoring Benton's rival John C. Calhoun of South Carolina after Benton's renunciation of slavery |
| Cahawba County | former state capital of Cahawba | Bibb County in 1820 |
| Cotaco County | Cotaco Creek, a tributary of the Tennessee River | Morgan County in 1821 |
| Hancock County | John Hancock, signer of the Declaration of Independence | Winston County in 1858 |
| Jones County | Josiah Jones, a local political leader | Covington County (its former name) in 1868 after Jones refused the honor |
| Jones County | E.P. Jones, a local landowner | Sanford County, which subsequently became Lamar County in 1877 |
| Sanford County | H.C. Sanford, a local landowner | Lamar County in 1877 |

== Former counties ==
| County | Established | Dissolved | Named for | Notes |
|---|---|---|---|---|
| Decatur County | December 7, 1821 | December 28, 1825 | Commodore Stephen Decatur of the United States Navy. | Created in 1822 with Woodville as its county seat. Abolished several years later, divided between Madison County and Jackson County. |
| Elk County | May 9, 1817 | January 26, 1818 | Elk River | Established by Mississippi Territory prior to Mississippi–Alabama split; abolished prior to Alabama statehood |

== See also ==
- List of census county divisions in Alabama
- List of municipalities in Alabama
- List of United States counties and county equivalents
