= 2011 Cullman–Arab tornado =

EF4 tornado in Alabama, U.S.

Coordinates: 34.0757°N 87.0097°W

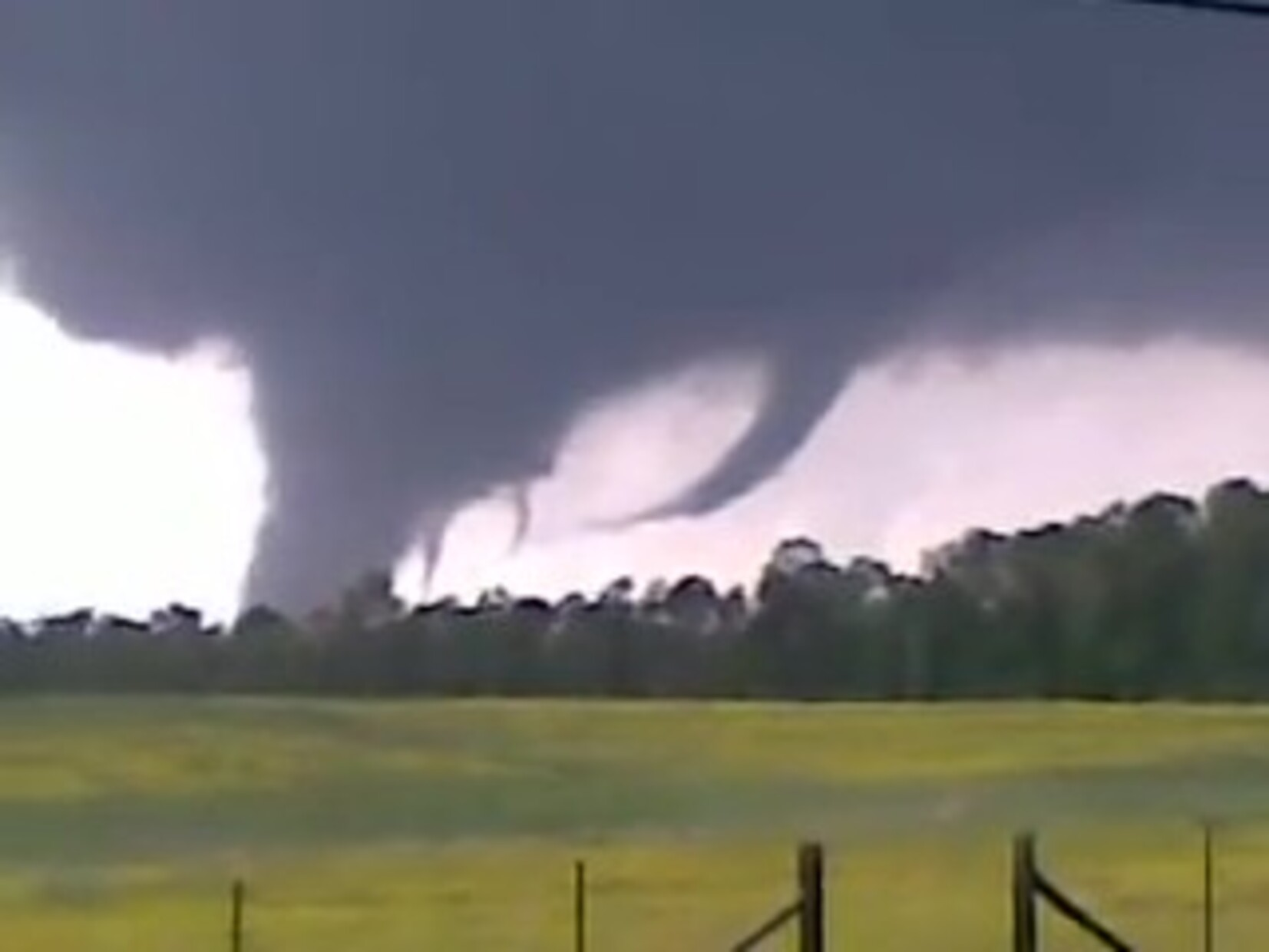
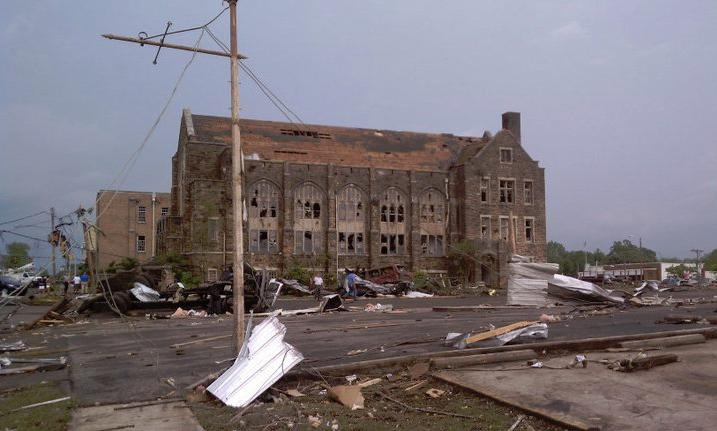
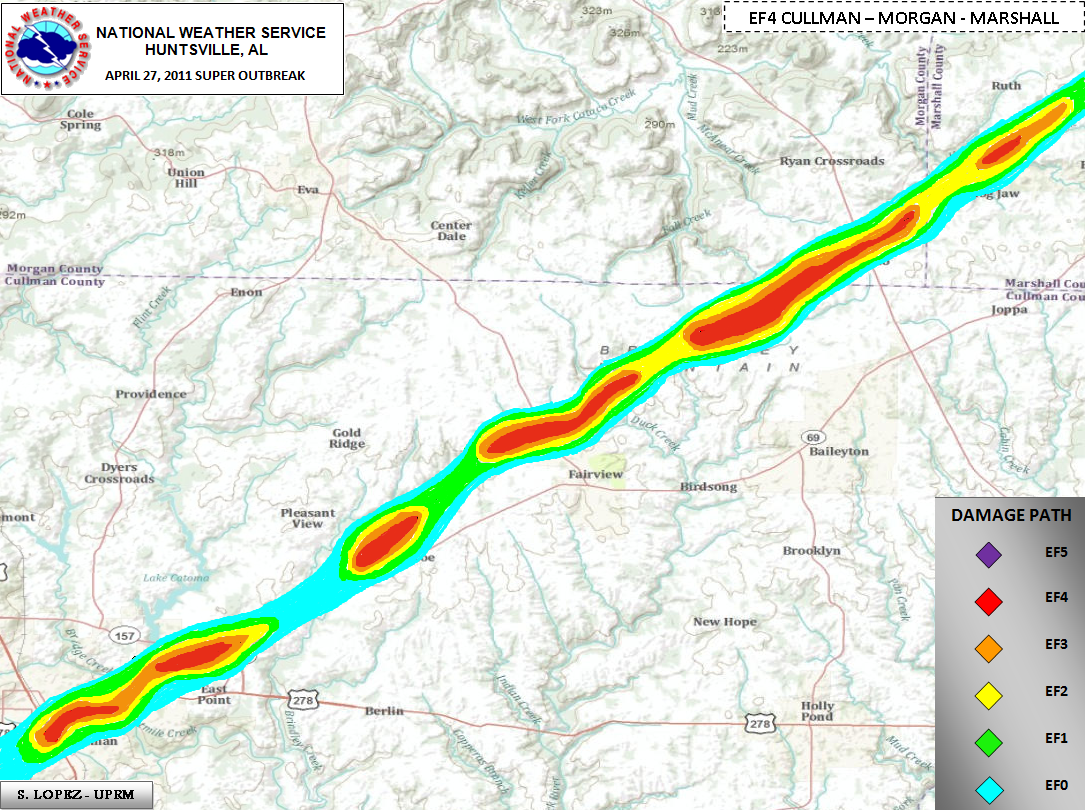
- Clockwise from the top: The tornado producing a large horizontal vortex as it approached Cullman; An intensity contour map of the tornadoes track; EF4 damage to the First Methodist Church in downtown Cullman.

Meteorological history
- Formed: April 27, 2011, 2:40 p.m. CDT (UTC−05:00)
- Dissipated: April 27, 2011, 3:38 p.m. CDT (UTC−05:00)
- Duration: 58 minutes

EF4 tornado
- on the Enhanced Fujita scale
- Max width: 880 yards (0.50 mi)
- Path length: 46.88 miles (75.45 km)
- Highest winds: 190 mph (310 km/h)

Overall effects
- Fatalities: 6
- Injuries: 48
- Damage: ~$13.5 million (2011 USD)
- Areas affected: Cullman County, Morgan County and Marshall County
- Part of the 2011 Super Outbreak and Tornadoes of 2011

On the afternoon of April 27, 2011, a large, long-tracked, and violent EF4 multi-vortex tornado moved across north-central Alabama, in the United States, striking numerous towns along its 47-mile (76 km) track, including Cullman, Fairview, Arab and Ruth. The tornado killed 6, injured over 40, and impacted hundreds of structures. It occurred as part of the largest tornado outbreak in modern history, and was the second violent tornado of the outbreak, touching down after the Philadelphia, Mississippi tornado.

The tornado first touched down in Cullman County before entering the city limits of Cullman, where EF4 damage was recorded to numerous buildings, including a large church in the downtown area. The tornado then left the Cullman area, moving through Fairview and heavily damaging multiple buildings located in the town. As the tornado tracked through Morgan and Marshall counties, it struck several smaller villages, including Ruth, where heavy damage was documented. Shortly after crossing the Tennessee River, the tornado dissipated.

The tornado devastated downtown Cullman, inflicting an estimated $13.5 million (2011 USD) to the city and causing widespread power outages throughout Cullman County. The tornado had maximum estimated windspeeds of 190 miles per hour (310 km/h), classifying it as violent. Several buildings, many made of brick, in downtown Cullman were leveled by these winds, and the tornado directly preceded several other violent tornadoes that would touch down shortly after, including the Hackleburg–Phil Campbell tornado, 20 minutes before the Cullman tornado dissipated.

== Meteorological synopsis ==
=== Setup ===
The environmental conditions leading up to the 2011 Super Outbreak were among the "most conducive to violent tornadoes ever documented". On April 25, a vigorous upper-level shortwave trough moved into the Southern Plains states. Ample instability, low-level moisture, and wind shear all fueled a significant tornado outbreak from Texas to Tennessee; at least 64 tornadoes touched down on this day. An area of low pressure consolidated over Texas on April 26 and traveled east while the aforementioned shortwave trough traversed the Mississippi and Ohio River valleys. Another 50 tornadoes touched down on this day. The multi-day outbreak culminated on April 27 with the most violent day of tornadic activity since the 1974 Super Outbreak. Multiple episodes of tornadic activity ensued with two waves of mesoscale convective systems in the morning hours followed by a widespread outbreak of supercells from Mississippi to North Carolina during the afternoon into the evening.

Tornadic activity on April 27 was precipitated by a 995 mbar (hPa; 29.39 inHg) surface low situated over Kentucky and a deep, negatively tilted (aligned northwest to southeast) trough over Arkansas and Louisiana. A strong southwesterly surface jet intersected these systems at a 60° angle, an ageostrophic flow that led to storm-relative helicity values in excess of 500 m^{2}s^{−2}—indicative of extreme wind shear and a very high potential for rotating updrafts within supercells. Ample moisture from the Gulf of Mexico was brought north across the Deep South, leading to daytime high temperatures of 77 to 81 °F (25 to 27 °C) and dewpoints of 66 to 72 °F (19 to 22 °C). Furthermore, convective available potential energy (CAPE) values reached 2,500–3,000 J/kg^{−1}.

=== Forecast ===
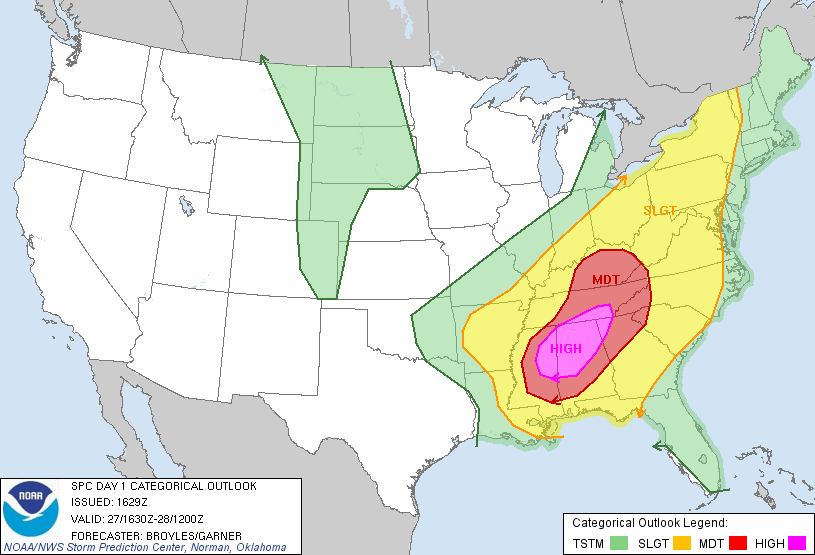
The National Weather Service Storm Prediction Center's Day 1 Convective Outlook for April 27, showing the Categorical Graphic

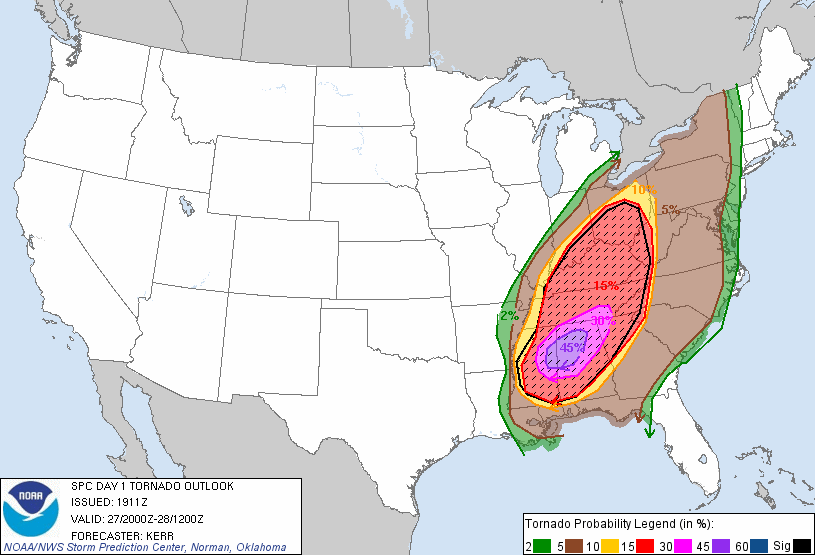
The probability of a tornado within 25 miles of a point (cross-hatched area: 10% or greater probability of EF2+ tornadoes)

On the morning of April 27, a strong cold front with several areas of embedded low pressure extended from the Texas Hill Country northeastward towards the Arklatex and the Ozarks, and later into the lower Ohio Valley. Warm moist air was in place due to strong southerly flow ahead of the front over Mississippi, Alabama, and Tennessee. An upper level disturbance sparked a broad area of showers and thunderstorms as it moved across the frontal boundary on the previous evening. The eastern edge of the line of showers and storms continued to move eastward, in concert with the upper disturbance, reaching the northwest Alabama border around 2:00 a.m. CDT.

This produced the last and most violent round of severe weather, which began around 2:30 p.m. CDT for northern Alabama as supercells began to line up to the southwest of the area. During the early afternoon hours, the potential for destructive tornadoes was highlighted by the Storm Prediction Center's upgrade to a high risk for severe weather around 1:00 p.m. CDT. This prompted a particularly dangerous situation (PDS) tornado watch, which was issued for northern Alabama and portions of southern Tennessee at 1:45 p.m. CDT. The bulletin that accompanied the watch read:

THE NWS STORM PREDICTION CENTER HAS ISSUED A TORNADO WATCH FOR PORTIONS OF: MUCH OF ALABAMA, NORTHWEST GEORGIA, SOUTHEAST MISSISSIPPI, SOUTHERN MIDDLE TENNESSEE, EFFECTIVE THIS WEDNESDAY AFTERNOON AND EVENING FROM 145 PM UNTIL 1000 PM CDT.

...THIS IS A PARTICULARLY DANGEROUS SITUATION...

DESTRUCTIVE TORNADOES...LARGE HAIL TO 4 INCHES IN DIAMETER. THUNDERSTORM WIND GUSTS TO 80 MPH...AND DANGEROUS LIGHTNING ARE POSSIBLE IN THESE AREAS.

The potential for tornadoes ramped up from noon through 9:00 p.m. CDT. During this period, much of Alabama experienced numerous supercell thunderstorms that produced violent tornadoes, including five EF4 tornadoes, one being the Cullman tornado.

== Tornado summary ==
- Damage survey track of this tornado (centermost red line), as well as the tracks of other EF3+ tornadoes that occurred during 2011 Super Outbreak. (Interactive map, click or tap to view in detail); View mapdata Key EF0 65–85 mph (105–137 km/h); EF1 86–110 mph (138–177 km/h); EF2 111–135 mph (179–217 km/h); EF3 136–165 mph (219–266 km/h); EF4 166–200 mph (267–322 km/h); EF5 ≥201 mph (323 km/h)

The tornado first touched down on the northeast side of Lewis Smith Lake at 2:40 p.m. CDT, and started moving to the northeast while slowly gaining intensity. As the tornado moved toward the Cullman area, it passed north of Grandview, where EF1 damage was documented. After passing Grandview, the tornado became narrower, before rapidly widening to the southwest of Cullman.

=== Track through Cullman ===
The tornado entered Cullman while being tracked and broadcast live via several tower cameras, including those operated by Birmingham Fox affiliate WBRC (channel 6) and ABC affiliate WBMA-LD/WCFT-TV/WJSU-TV (channels 58, 33, and 40 – ABC 33/40), for several minutes. The ABC 33/40 camera captured the destruction of a communications tower belonging to Cullman area low-power television station WCQT-LP as the tornado ripped through the city at EF3 intensity. Radio stations in downtown Cullman also reported on the tornado and some even captured it passing over until power was knocked out.

Downtown Cullman was badly damaged by the tornado, with the major damage being along a two-block area through the center of the downtown business district. Numerous well-built brick buildings and storefronts in downtown Cullman were heavily damaged or completely destroyed as the tornado briefly attained EF4 intensity.

Damage to the Christ Lutheran Church in downtown was rated low-end EF4 as most of the structure completely collapsed. The courthouse and nearby emergency management building took a direct hit from the tornado, sustaining considerable damage, and two school buildings were heavily damaged as well. Many businesses, such as Vincent's Furniture, The Cullman Times building, and the Busy Bee Cafe, were also severely damaged or destroyed. Many homes were damaged or destroyed in residential areas of the city, with extensive tree and power line damage noted as well. In all, a total of 867 residences and 94 businesses within the city of Cullman were damaged or destroyed.

The tornado roughly followed US 278 through the city, in which it created extensive damage along many major intersections, including those with I-65, US 31, SR 157, and SR 69. The tornado continued northeast, becoming large and wedge-shaped as it reattained EF4 intensity.

=== Fairview and Hulaco ===
As the tornado left the city limits of Cullman, it struck County Road 506, located directly south of Pleasant View, where EF1 damage was documented. Shortly after, while retaining EF1 intensity, the tornado moved north of Simcoe, where damage north of Highway was observed. The tornado rapidly intensified as it moved north of Fairview. Several trees that lined Brindley Creek were debarked at EF4 intensity, and trees were snapped at EF1 intensity. Two well-constructed homes were destroyed north of Fairview, and large portions of the homes were never recovered. One home was heavily damaged at EF3 intensity, and the tornado continued to move in a northeastward direction towards Hulaco.

The tornado rapidly intensified again as it approached the western edge of Hulaco, where a home was completely destroyed at EF4 intensity. Several trees in the area were debarked as the windspeed of the tornado approached 150 miles per hour (240 km/h). An electrical transmission tower was crumpled and bent over at EF3 intensity nearby, and several more trees were debarked and damaged at EF2 intensity as the tornado neared downtown Hulaco. EF4 damage was recorded in the center of Hulaco, where a home was obliterated. The tornado left a swath of EF4 damage through the eastern portions of Hulaco, and this intensity was retained for several miles. The tornado continued to move northeastward, narrowly avoiding the center of Hog Jaw, where the worst damage from the tornado was documented. Along Hog Jaw Road, a large storage shed with farm equipment was destroyed and some of the large machinery was tossed 60 feet (18 m) away from the shed.

=== Damage to Ruth ===
The tornado crossed into Marshall County, and passed west of Egypt, where a home was damaged at EF1 intensity. As the tornado passed east of Ruth, it became violent, destroying a home and leaving a bare, debris-swept slab where it once stood. (Note: "Slabs" refer to the concrete or brick foundations that homes lay atop, a building feature common in the United States. The tornado obliterated the home, removing its walls and leaving the foundation exposed.) The tornado was estimated to have windspeeds of 190 miles per hour (310 km/h) in this area, its most intense point. Several large trees in the vicinity of the home were ripped out of the ground, and a Jet Pep gas station was completely destroyed. Two of the gas pumps were ripped out of the ground, and were never recovered. Five of the fatalities from the tornado occurred in Ruth, all of whom were in the same family.

A shed was destroyed with pieces of large farm machinery stored inside thrown up to 20 yards (18 m) away, a storage trailer was tossed 100 yards (91 m) and found impaled by planks of wood, and steel power poles in the area were bent over. As the tornado left Ruth, it slightly widened before narrowing and crossing US 231 at EF3 intensity. The tornado then began to weaken, before turning slightly to the east. It passed west of Union Grove, and then crossed the Tennessee River at EF1 intensity. Several trees were snapped on the other side of the river, and the tornado crossed US 431 before dissipating at 3:38 p.m. CDT.

=== Possible EF5 intensity ===
On January 23, 2025, Anthony W. Lyza with the National Severe Storms Laboratory along with Harold E. Brooks and Makenzie J. Kroca with the University of Oklahoma’s School of Meteorology published a paper to the American Meteorological Society, where they stated the tornado in Cullman was an "EF5 candidate" and opined that the EF5 starting wind speed should be 190 mph (310 km/h) instead of 201 mph (323 km/h).

== Aftermath ==
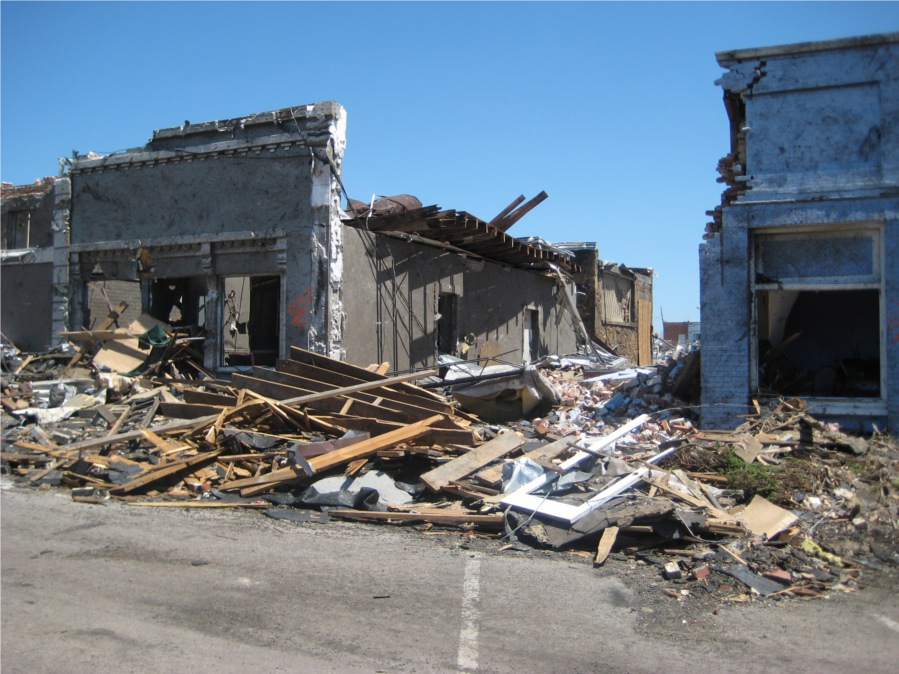
EF4 structural damage in downtown Cullman

Cullman was devastated by the tornado, where several businesses and homes were completely destroyed. A fire station and the Cullman Emergency Ambulance Service building were heavily damaged. The Busy Bee Café, located on Fifth Street in downtown Cullman, was destroyed. Exactly a year after the tornado, the cafe reopened in the same location where it was destroyed. The WKUL radio tower and a NOAA Weather Radio transmitter were both destroyed during the tornado, and the latter was not put back online until the following year. A bulletin published by the National Weather Service office in Huntsville stated that the tower would be indefinitely down.

Widespread power outages occurred in the immediate aftermath of the tornado, which were largely centered in Cullman County. Almost 200 power poles in and around Cullman were leveled, and 4,000 volunteers from the Tennessee Valley Authority helped to restore power, although some residents were still without power a week after the tornado. The State of Alabama gave $5,989,728 (2011 USD) to the City of Cullman to aid with recovery efforts, and a further $1,294,892 (2011 USD) to Cullman County. A plan was also set in place by the University of Alabama to help fund recovery efforts.

Six people were killed by the tornado; five in Ruth and one in rural Cullman County. The five deaths in Ruth occurred when the tornado directly impacted a well-constructed home at EF4 intensity, leveling the building and killing all of the residents of the home; all were in the same family. The sixth death as a result of the tornado took place in Cullman County, in the tornado's early stages. Storm chaser Dan Whittaker, who was observing the tornado as it moved through Cullman near him, stated that "this is not like any tornado I've seen anywhere."

== See also ==
- 1974 Cullman tornado, an F4 tornado during the 1974 Super Outbreak that impacted Cullman
- 1995 Joppa–Arab tornado, an F3 tornado that impacted similar areas in 1995

== References and notes ==
=== Sources ===
- "April 27th, Cullman, Morgan, Marshall EF4 Tornado". National Weather Service.
- "April 27th 2011 Severe Weather Setup". National Weather Service.
