= WTWX-FM =

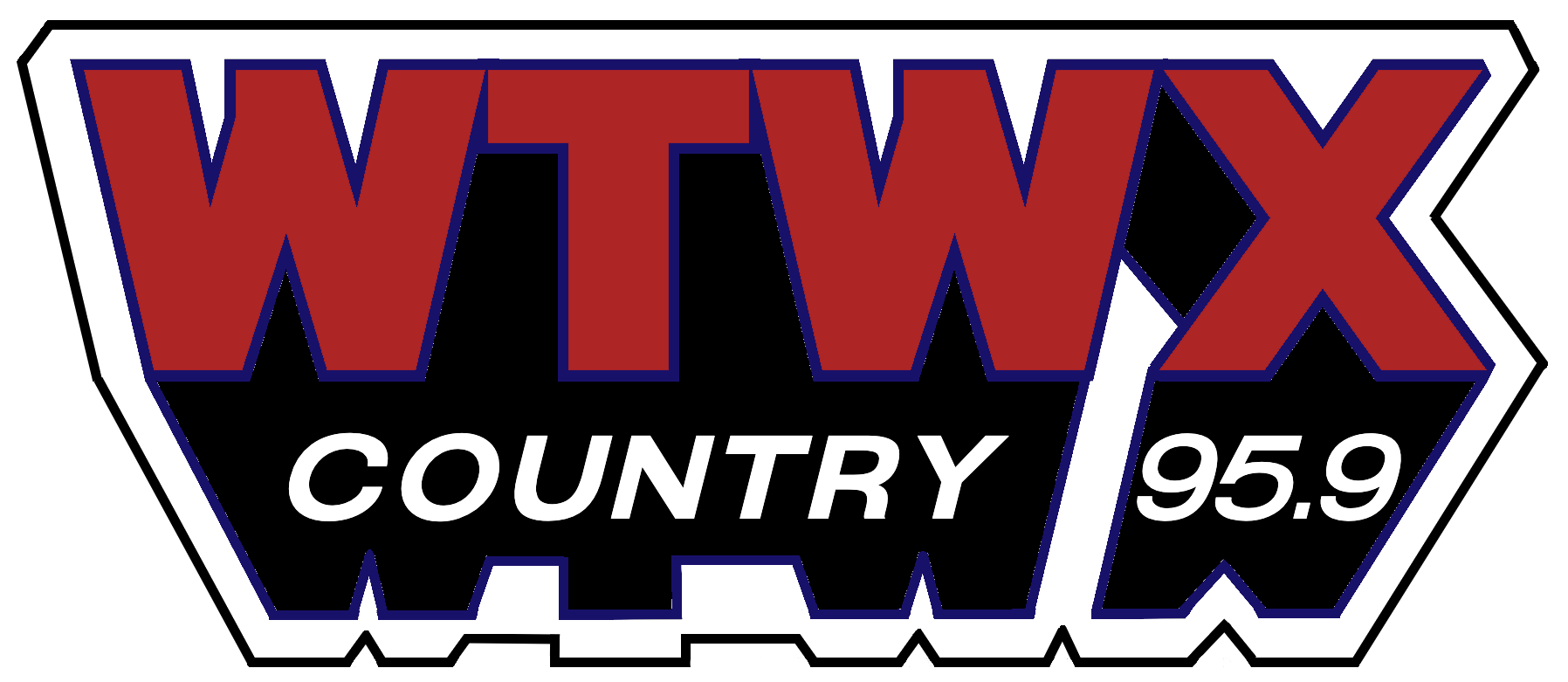

Guntersville, Alabama; United States
- Broadcast area: Huntsville, Alabama
- Frequency: 95.9 MHz
- Branding: Country 95.9

Programming
- Format: Country music/Sports/Talk
- Affiliations: Premiere Networks; United Stations Radio Networks; Westwood One

Ownership
- Owner: Guntersville Broadcasting Company, Inc.

History
- First air date: August 1, 1969

Technical information
- Licensing authority: FCC
- Facility ID: 25674
- Class: C3
- ERP: 25,000 watts
- HAAT: 157 meters (515 feet)
- Transmitter coordinates: 34°20′14″N 86°16′46″W

Links
- Public license information: Public file; LMS
- Webcast: http://www.wtwx.com/html/Listen%20Live.htm
- Website: wtwx.com http://www.wtwxsports.com

WTWX-FM (95.9 MHz, "Country 95.9") is a radio station serving the Huntsville, Alabama, market. WTWX-FM is licensed to the nearby city of Guntersville, Alabama. The station is owned and operated by Guntersville Broadcasting Company, Inc. The station's studios and transmitter are located separately in Guntersville.

The station was assigned the WTWX-FM call letters by the Federal Communications Commission on 1969.

== Programming ==
WTWX-FM broadcasts a country music format. In addition to their regular music programming, they carry the syndicated talk show The Clay Travis and Buck Sexton Show each weekday. WTWX-FM broadcasts hourly newscasts from the ABC Radio Network, and breaking news from the Associated Press. Sports coverage includes broadcasts of Atlanta Braves baseball games, Auburn University football and basketball games, Guntersville High School football games and basketball games. They have broadcast Guntersville High School football for over 60 consecutive years. Some longtime local favorite programming includes The Wake Up Show with Bruce airing weekday mornings since 1958 and The Cabin on the Hill Gospel Show airing Sunday mornings beginning on December 31, 1960. Both programs have continued for decades.
