= 1995 Joppa–Arab tornado =

1995 tornado in Alabama, U.S.

- Significant damage to the Joppa Elementary School

Meteorological history
- Date: February 16, 1995

F3 tornado
- on the Fujita scale
- Highest winds: 158–206 miles per hour (254–332 km/h)

Overall effects
- Fatalities: 6 (+2 indirect)
- Injuries: 130
- Areas affected: Marshall County, Alabama
- Part of the Tornadoes of 1995

In the early morning hours of February 16, 1995, an intense tornado impacted the communities of Joppa and Arab, both located in the U.S. state of Alabama. The tornado, which was rated F3 on the Fujita scale, damaged or destroyed many structures along a 14-mile (23 km) long, 703 yards (643 m) wide path that stretched through Marshall County. Six people were killed during the event and 130 others sustained injuries. A lack of warnings leading up to the tornado as well as the Federal Emergency Management Agency (FEMA) response were sources of controversies.

== Tornado summary ==
The tornado first touched down near Alabama State Routes 67 and 69, located near the Marshall County line. Along State Route 69 the Joppa General Store suffered canopy and sign damage. It then moved into Joppa, damaging the Joppa Junior High School and Department of Transportation office in town. At least 20 structures sustained some form of damage along this portion of the tornado's path; Joppa Elementary was largely destroyed, with the gym and lunch rooms being demolished. The original Joppa School and former college was additionally heavily damaged on the property. Between Joppa and Arab the tornado snapped and uprooted hardwood trees.

A home in Arab that was destroyed by the tornado

As the tornado moved over Main Street it reached an estimated 0.5 miles (0.80 km) in width, completely destroying numerous structures. The Amberwood Apartment complex suffered extensive roofing damage from the tornado, where one person was killed. Near U.S. Highway 231 an office housing the Arab Tribune suffered significant damage; a clock inside the building recorded 5:02 a.m. (Note: For consistency, all times in the article are in Central Daylight Time.) as the time of the tornado's impact at the property. The tornado impacted the Berry Trailer Park on the southern side of town, lofting a child 50 yards (46 m) and destroying trailer homes. The tornado then impacted a cemetery, where debris was thrown across a street.

After leaving Arab the tornado continued to the northeast, crossing the Tennessee River before lifting. It was on the ground for 14 miles, reaching a maximum estimated width of 703 yards;

=== National Weather Service evacuation ===
At around 4:25 a.m. a lightning strike occurred at the National Weather Service (NWS) office in Huntsville, hitting near the office's radar dome and a nearby communications tower. As a result, instruments that had been used to warn severe thunderstorms that morning failed, and an instrument panel within the radar control room caught on fire; at the same time the NOAA Weather Radio transmitter for Huntsville was taken offline. Personnel were forced to evacuate the building as the phone lines used to call for help were also affected by the strike.The NWS office in Birmingham, Alabama, took over to warn the approaching storms, including issuing a tornado warning five to ten minutes before the Joppa–Arab tornado impacted the communities.

== Aftermath ==
=== Damage and recovery ===
NEXRAD observations of the storm led the tornado to be rated F3 on the Fujita scale, with maximum estimated wind speeds from 158–206 miles per hour (254–332 km/h). Authorities closed off access to portions of Joppa and Arab to prevent looting. 40 inmates from the Limestone County Correctional Facility were deployed to Arab to aid rescue crews in cleanup following the event.

In March 1996, a $150,000 (1996 USD) warning siren system was installed in Arab that includes eight sirens, including one near U.S. Highway 231 with a memorial plaque.

=== Casualties ===
Six people were killed by the tornado, including one person in Joppa and five in Arab. Two additional deaths occurred in a car accident along U.S. Route 31 near Cullman. The Guntersville–Arab Medical Center reported on February 17 that 66 people had been treated for injuries in relation to the tornado, while four others were transferred to the Huntsville Hospital. 13 of the patients had been listed in critical condition.

List of fatalities attributed to the tornado
Name	Age	Location	Town	Ref.
Elanor M. Allred	88	Cullman Regional Medical Center	Cullman	
Ora Lee Whitaker	70	Guntersville–Arab Medical Center	Arab	
Kristen Parker	4	South Main Street	Arab	
Robert Earl Hayes	49	Brashiers Chapel Road	Arab	
Joseph David Price	36	Thomas Falls Gap Road	Arab	
Unborn child	N/A	N/A	Arab	

=== Controversies ===
Following the event, controversies arose regarding both NWS claims regarding warning time before the tornado hit and the Federal Emergency Management Agency (FEMA) response. WAAY-TV meteorologist Bob Baron accused the NWS of lying about how much lead time was given as the tornado approached Arab, noting that "[NWS] Birmingham has been saying that they can take over the Tennessee Valley ... they failed to issue a warning for Cullman and Joppa, and that is their current responsibility". Arab Police Lieutenant Danny Harvell stated in regard to the warning time that "we didn't have a chance" and that no sirens went off in the town. Democratic senator Howell Heflin requested that the NWS investigate all procedures that were taken to issue the tornado warning. Tornado detection in northern Alabama had been a source of controversy for years leading up to the Arab tornado, in part due to a plan at the time that called for the closure of the NWS office in Huntsville.

Mayor of Arab Johnny Hart heavily criticized FEMA's response to the tornado, specifically their rejection of a federal aid request shortly following the event. He exclaimed that "my major concern is that our citizens have to place their lives on hold while we await a decision from FEMA" and that "I'm real disheartened". Hart called for a congressional investigation into FEMA's denial of disaster aid. Senator Richard Shelby accused FEMA director James Witt of abandoning the state of Alabama, saying that "FEMA and the Clinton administration have chosen to turn their backs on the residents of these small communities". Additional concerns were raised that FEMA may have been running out of disaster relief funds at the time of the tornado due to aid provided in California and Florida.

== See also ==
- 2011 Cullman–Arab tornado, a later EF4 tornado near Arab that killed six
