= Red apple =

Red apple may refer to:

== Apples ==
- A red apple
  - List of apple cultivars
  - Red Delicious

== Businesses ==
- Red Apple, formerly The Bargain! Shop, a Canadian discount store chain
- Red Apple Group, an American real estate, media and aviation company
  - Red Apple convenience stores owned by United Refining Company
  - Red Apple Media, a radio network flagshipped at WABC (AM)
- Red Apple, trademark of the Waldorf System lunchroom chain in New England

== Places ==
- Red Apple, Alabama, U.S.

== Other ==
- The Red Apple, a skyscraper in Rotterdam, Netherlands
- The Red Apple (film), a 1975 Soviet drama film
- Red Apples (film), a 1975 Romanian drama film
- Acmena ingens, or red apple, a rainforest tree of eastern Australia
- Red Apple, a fictional brand of cigarette in Quentin Tarantino films

== See also ==
- Red Apple Tree, a Greek legend
