= Cherokee Ridge, Alabama =

- town
- Location within Alabama Location within the United States
- Coordinates: 34°25′28″N 86°33′49″W
- Country: United States
- State: Alabama
- County: Marshall
- Founded: 2021

Government
  - Type: Mayor Council
  - Mayor: Natalie Burke

Area
  - town: 0.9 sq mi (2.3 km^{2})
  - Land: 0.9 sq mi (2.3 km^{2})
  - Water: 0 sq mi (0 km^{2})

Population
  - town: 324
  - Estimate (2024): 332
  - Density: 360/sq mi (140/km^{2})
  - Metro: 99,423
  - Metro density: 175.7/sq mi (67.84/km^{2})
- Time zone: UTC−6 (Central (CST))
  - Summer (DST): UTC−5 (CDT)
- ZIP Codes: 35175
- Area codes: 256 and 938
- GNIS feature ID: 2403074
- Website: www.townofcherokeeridge.com

Cherokee Ridge is a town in Marshall County, Alabama. It was incorporated in 2021 following a vote to incorporate passed with 140 votes for and 17 votes against incorporation. It is located off U.S. Route 231 to the west about halfway between Huntsville and Arab. Cherokee Ridge was first settled by Sid McDonald in 1992 and has a golf course and country club. The population was 324 in 2020 U.S Census estimates.
