= Little New York =

Little New York may refer to:

- Little New York, Alabama
- Little York, California, formerly called Little New York
- Staten Island (film), a 2009 film also titled Little New York
