= Phil Williams (Alabama state representative) =

American politician

Member of the Alabama House of Representatives from the 6th district
- In office 2009 – November 7, 2018
- Preceded by: Sue Schmitz
- Succeeded by: Andy Whitt

Personal details
- Born: Grassy, Alabama, U.S.
- Party: Republican
- Spouse: Lisa Williams
- Children: 1
- Education: University of Alabama in Huntsville
- Profession: Businessman

Phil Williams is an American politician and businessman from the state of Alabama. He served as a Republican member of the Alabama House of Representatives representing the 6th District, serving from 2009 to 2018.

== Early life and education ==
Williams was born in Grassy, an unincorporated place in Marshall County, Alabama, where his family owned an 800-square-foot (74 m^{2}) farmhouse. His father was a civil servant and his mother stayed at home, raising five children, of which Phil was the fourth. He graduated from the University of Alabama in Huntsville with a degree in international business.

== Career ==
In 1983, Williams was selected to work as a contract negotiator on the Strategic Defense Initiative under President Ronald Reagan after submitting a job application for the program. Williams later co-founded 3D Research Corporation in 1997 alongside his wife, Lisa Williams. He also co-founded Synapse Wireless and Soldier 1 Corporation in 2006 and 2008 respectively, the latter of which also had the involvement of his wife Lisa. Williams sold two of his companies for a sizeable profit, and he and his wife became "multi-millionaires", according to the Alabama Political Reporter. Williams then entered real estate investment.

Williams first ran for the Alabama House of Representatives in a 2009 special election for the sixth district, after incumbent Sue Schmitz was found guilty on corruption charges. He was re-elected in 2010 and 2014 without major party opposition.

A self-described fiscal conservative, Williams opposed a tax on the dispensing of prescriptions when it was first passed in 2015; it was later repealed in August 2016. He also pushed for increased funding towards education, especially pre-kindergarten, and helped pass the Alabama Ahead Act to fund hands-on technology in classrooms.

In 2015, in the wake of Mike Hubbard's indictment on charges of corruption, Williams unsuccessfully ran for Speaker of the Alabama House of Representatives. In 2016, Williams was one of 23 state legislators to sign articles of impeachment against Governor Robert J. Bentley, who later resigned. Williams served in the Alabama State Legislature at the same time as Senator Phil Williams, both Republicans who coincidentally shared the same name. The two disagreed on HB-317, a bill exempting "economic development professionals" from requiring registration as lobbyists; Representative Williams opposed it in the Alabama House of Representatives, while Senator Williams sponsored the bill in the Alabama Senate.

Williams announced in August 2017 that he would seek the Republican nomination for the Alabama Senate's second district in the 2018 election, after being encouraged to run by incumbent state Senator Bill Holtzclaw. However, Williams ultimately decided not to run by January 2018 and retired from public service, as he did not run for re-election to his House seat, either. Williams was succeeded by Andy Whitt.

== Personal life ==
Williams resides in Huntsville, Alabama, and is married to businesswoman Lisa Williams, who was named a "2020 Women of Impact" by the conservative website Yellowhammer News. The couple have one son.

== Electoral history ==
2014 Alabama House of Representatives, 6th district, general election results
Party	Candidate	Votes	%
Republican	Phil Williams (incumbent)	8,323	97.2%
Write-In	Write-ins	237	2.8%
Total votes		8,560	100.0%
Republican hold			

2010 Alabama House of Representatives, 6th district, general election results
Party	Candidate	Votes	%
Republican	Phil Williams (incumbent)	9,880	94.0%
Write-In	Write-ins	308	6.0%
Total votes		10,188	100.0%
Republican hold			

2009 Alabama House of Representatives, 6th district, general special election results
Party	Candidate	Votes	%
Republican	Phil Williams	2,552	60.2%
Democratic	Jenny Rhodes Askins	1,663	39.3%
Write-In	Write-ins	22	0.5%
Total votes		4,237	100.0%
Republican gain from Democratic			

2009 Alabama House of Representatives, 6th district, Republican Party primary results
Party	Candidate	Votes	%
Republican	Phil Williams	838	51.9%
Republican	Glenn Watson	393	24.3%
Republican	Tommy Carter	331	20.5%
Republican	Frank L. Prabel III	53	3.3%
Total votes		1,109	100.0%
