= Egypt, Marshall County, Alabama =

Unincorporated community in Alabama, United States

Egypt, Alabama
- Unincorporated community
- Location within Alabama Location within the United States
- Coordinates: 34°20′39″N 86°32′02″W
- Country: United States
- State: Alabama
- County: Marshall
- Elevation: 1,047 ft (319 m)
- Time zone: UTC-6 (Central (CST))
  - Summer (DST): UTC-5 (CDT)
- Area codes: 256 & 938
- GNIS feature ID: 156300

Egypt is an unincorporated community in Marshall County, Alabama, United States, located 2.8 miles (4.5 km) northwest of Arab.
