= Eddy, Alabama =

Unincorporated community in Alabama, United States

- Unincorporated community
- Location within Alabama Location within the United States
- Coordinates: 34°21′19″N 86°30′34″W
- Country: United States
- State: Alabama
- County: Marshall
- Elevation: 1,083 ft (330 m)
- Time zone: UTC-6 (Central (CST))
  - Summer (DST): UTC-5 (CDT)
- Area codes: 256 & 938
- GNIS feature ID: 117849

Eddy is an unincorporated community in Marshall County, Alabama, United States. Eddy was most likely named for a local resident. A post office operated under the name Eddy from 1894 to 1907.
