= Scant City, Alabama =

Unincorporated community in Alabama, United States

- Unincorporated community
- Location within Alabama Location within the United States
- Coordinates: 34°21′44″N 86°25′25″W
- Country: United States
- State: Alabama
- County: Marshall
- Elevation: 1,017 ft (310 m)
- Time zone: UTC-6 (Central (CST))
  - Summer (DST): UTC-5 (CDT)
- Area codes: 256 & 938
- GNIS feature ID: 153345

Scant City, also known as Marghton, is an unincorporated community in Marshall County, Alabama, United States. It is between Arab and Guntersville.

Local legend is that the origin of the name is from the dairy days, when a local man was infamous for selling “scant pints” of slightly less cow milk to unsuspecting customers. Local lore is the name came from the days when Marshall county was a "dry" county and the farmer sold moonshine by the pint.
