= Pinedale Shores, Marshall County, Alabama =

Pinedale Shores, Alabama
- Unincorporated community
- Location within Alabama Location within the United States
- Coordinates: 34°25′06″N 86°15′49″W
- Country: United States
- State: Alabama
- County: Marshall
- Elevation: 620 ft (190 m)
- Time zone: UTC-6 (Central (CST))
  - Summer (DST): UTC-5 (CDT)
- Area codes: 256 & 938
- GNIS feature ID: 148854

Pinedale Shores, Alabama is a populated place in Marshall County. It is situated at 620 feet (190 meters) above mean sea level.
