= Cottonville, Alabama =

Unincorporated community in Alabama, United States

- Unincorporated community
- Location within Alabama Location within the United States
- Coordinates: 34°27′12″N 86°20′08″W
- Country: United States
- State: Alabama
- County: Marshall
- Elevation: 623 ft (190 m)
- Time zone: UTC-6 (Central (CST))
  - Summer (DST): UTC-5 (CDT)
- Area codes: 256 & 938
- GNIS feature ID: 156219

Cottonville is an unincorporated community in Marshall County, Alabama, United States.
