= Grassy, Marshall County, Alabama =

Unincorporated community in Alabama, United States

Grassy, Alabama
- Unincorporated community
- Location within Alabama Location within the United States
- Coordinates: 34°21′15″N 86°26′12″W
- Country: United States
- State: Alabama
- County: Marshall
- Elevation: 1,030 ft (310 m)
- Time zone: UTC-6 (Central (CST))
  - Summer (DST): UTC-5 (CDT)
- Area codes: 256 & 938
- GNIS feature ID: 119249

Grassy is an unincorporated community in Marshall County, in the U.S. state of Alabama.

== History ==
A post office called Grassy was established in 1882, and remained in operation until 1905. Phil Williams, Alabama state representative, was born in Grassy.
