= Andy Whitt =

American banker and politician

Member of the Alabama House of Representatives from the 6th district
- Incumbent
- Assumed office November 7, 2018
- Preceded by: Phil Williams

Personal details
- Born: Michael Andrew Whitt December 22, 1974 (age 51)
- Party: Republican
- Spouse: Jennifer Whitt
- Children: 2

Michael Andrew Whitt is an American banker, politician, and a Republican member of the Alabama House of Representatives, representing District 6. Whitt is chair of the Economic Development and Tourism committee and vice chair of the house financial services committee. He is also a member of the Alabama Commission on the Evaluation of Services.

== Biography ==
Whitt is an eighth generation Alabamian and a lifelong resident of Madison County, Al. He is a 1993 graduate of Sparkman High School, attended Calhoun Community College and Louisiana State University (LSU). He was the vice president of the First American Bank from 1996 to 2008, and has been the senior vice president and Madison County Executive of the First National Bank since 2008. Whitt is married to his high school sweetheart, Jennifer Hilliard Whitt. They have 2 children, Grant and Drew.
