= Claysville, Alabama =

Unincorporated community in Alabama, United States

- Unincorporated community
- Location within Alabama Location within the United States
- Coordinates: 34°24′28″N 86°16′19″W
- Country: United States
- State: Alabama
- County: Marshall
- Elevation: 623 ft (190 m)
- Time zone: UTC-6 (Central (CST))
  - Summer (DST): UTC-5 (CDT)
- Area codes: 256 & 938
- GNIS feature ID: 156187

Claysville is an unincorporated community in Marshall County, Alabama, United States.

== History ==
Claysville was named in honor of Henry Clay, and served as the county seat of Marshall County from 1836 to 1838. During the American Civil War, Claysville became a strategic location, due to the ferry crossing of the Tennessee River. A Union Army garrison was located here during the latter part of the war. The 13th Wisconsin Volunteer Infantry Regiment was stationed here under the command of Colonel William P. Lyon. A post office operated under the name Claysville from 1831 to 1879.
