= Swearengin, Alabama =

Unincorporated community in Alabama, United States

- Unincorporated community
- Location within Alabama Location within the United States
- Coordinates: 34°33′48″N 86°11′25″W
- Country: United States
- State: Alabama
- County: Marshall
- Elevation: 1,345 ft (410 m)
- Time zone: UTC-6 (Central (CST))
  - Summer (DST): UTC-5 (CDT)
- Area codes: 256 & 938
- GNIS feature ID: 157135

Swearengin is an unincorporated community in Marshall County, Alabama, United States. A post office operated under the name Swearengin from 1881 to 1907.
