= Horton, Alabama =

Unincorporated community in Alabama, United States

- Unincorporated community
- Location within Alabama Location within the United States
- Coordinates: 34°12′03″N 86°17′49″W
- Country: United States
- State: Alabama
- County: Marshall
- Elevation: 981 ft (299 m)

Population (2000)
  - Total: 4,450
- Time zone: UTC-6 (Central (CST))
  - Summer (DST): UTC-5 (CDT)
- ZIP code: 35980
- Area codes: 256 & 938
- GNIS feature ID: 120437

Horton is an unincorporated community in Marshall County, Alabama, United States.

== Demographics ==
As of the 2000 census, the population was approximately 4,450. The median household income was $27,536, and the per capita income was $13,342. The median value of a single-family home was $72,200.

== Attractions ==
Horton is also the home to the Silver Ridge Golf Course In Horton there is also the local USPS postal office at 6936 Alabama State Route 75.
