= Buck's Pocket State Park =

State park in Alabama, United States

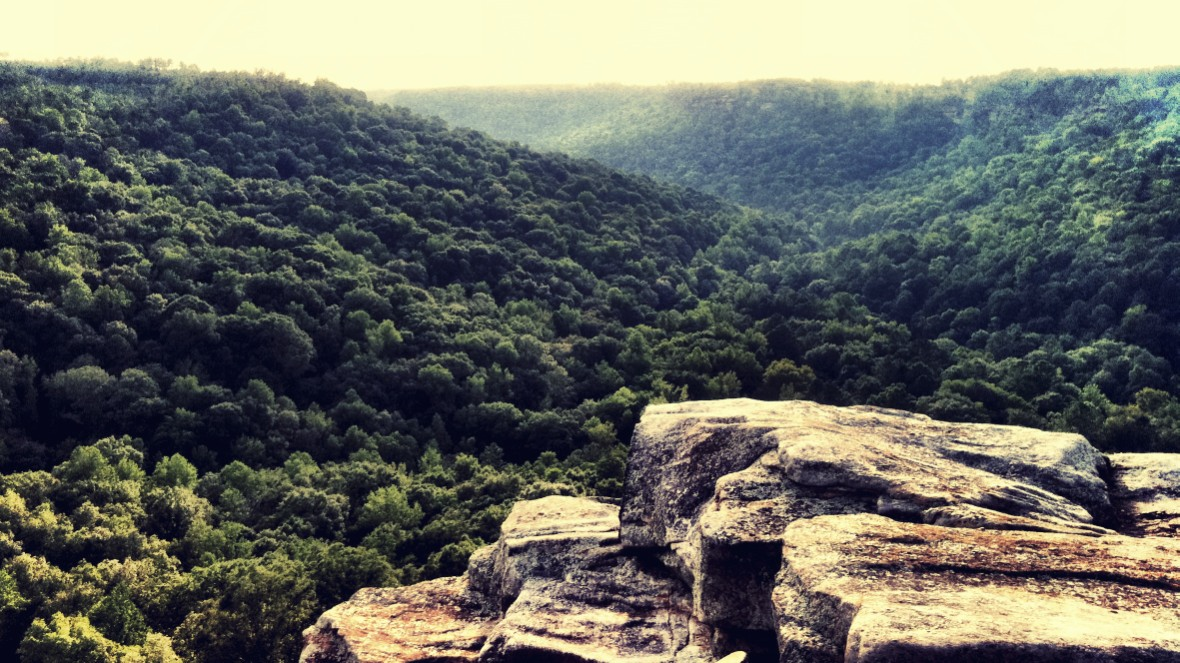

- Location within Alabama
- Interactive map of Buck's Pocket State Park
- Location: DeKalb, Jackson, and Marshall counties, Alabama, United States
- Coordinates: 34°28′52″N 86°05′17″W
- Area: 2,080 acres (840 ha)
- Elevation: 594 ft (181 m)
- Established: 1971
- Administrator: Alabama Department of Conservation and Natural Resources
- Website: Official website

Buck's Pocket State Park is a public recreation area located on Sand Mountain in the northeast corner of the U.S. state of Alabama, two miles (3.2 km) north of the community of Grove Oak. The state park occupies 2,000 acres (810 ha) surrounding a natural pocket (canyon) of the Appalachian Mountain chain along South Sauty Creek, an upstream tributary on the east side of Guntersville Lake. The park is known for the sweeping views of its rugged, seemingly untouched landscape provided from the heights of Point Rock.

== History ==
The park's origins date from 1966, when the Sand Mountain Booster's Club organized the Tri-County Park Authority and purchased land from a local farmer. Additional acreage totalling some 700 acres was contributed by the Tennessee Valley Authority. The park opened in 1971.

In 2015, Buck's Pocket lost its campground and its staffing as part of the closing and curtailment of services at several Alabama state parks following severe budget cuts. The park reopened with a renovated campground and the addition of an 8-mile-long ORV (Off-Road Recreational Vehicle) trail in 2020.

== Park lore ==
The origin of the name "Buck's Pocket" has been variously attributed to the presence of large herds of deer, the legendary death of a buck who leapt from Point Rock after being trapped by Cherokee, and a man named Buck Berry who used the area to hide from the draft during the Civil War.

A persistent story dating from the 1940s holds that unsuccessful Alabama politicians go to Buck's Pocket after being defeated at the polls. When specifically they go and what activities they pursue while there is not specified, but left to the imagination.

== Activities and amenities ==
The park offers scenic views from atop the Point Rock Overlook, 15 miles (24 km) of trails for hiking, and an 8-mile (13 km) ORV trail. The park's picnic area has a canyon rim vista into the pocket below. A boat launch and fishing area are provided seven miles downstream at Morgan's Cove on Lake Guntersville.
