= Bucksnort, Alabama =

Unincorporated community in Alabama, United States

- Unincorporated community
- Location within Alabama Location within the United States
- Coordinates: 34°30′11″N 86°18′14″W
- Country: United States
- State: Alabama
- County: Marshall
- Elevation: 1,129 ft (344 m)
- Time zone: UTC-6 (Central (CST))
  - Summer (DST): UTC-5 (CDT)
- Area codes: 256 & 938
- GNIS feature ID: 156131

Bucksnort is an unincorporated community in Marshall County, Alabama, United States. A post office served the area near Bucksnort and operated under the name Keel from 1889 to 1907.
