= Mississippi Bill Harris =

American WWII veteran and entrepreneur

"Mississippi" Bill Harris (1912 – August 23, 2004), born Wyman Henry Harris in Guntersville, Alabama, was a World War II veteran and an entrepreneur. However, he is best known for being an avid boater and for the many trips he took via waterways in a 12-foot aluminum fishing boat. The combined distance of these trips was 55,000 miles, over twice the circumference of the earth.

== Childhood ==
Bill Harris was born in 1912, the youngest of two brothers. His father was a doctor who died from the Spanish flu during the 1918 flu pandemic when Bill was 6. Bill was raised separately from his brother by an older cousin and his wife. When Bill was 10 years of age he learned to drive a car. He got his first job shortly thereafter transporting people from their homes to a local doctor's office. At the age of 12, Bill started working at a local theater.

== Guntersville Dam ==
In 1933 after the passing of the Tennessee Valley Authority Act, engineers came to the Guntersville area looking for a location for a dam that would provide river stability, waterways for transport, and hydroelectricity for the area. Bill was hired to transport TVA engineers by boat to scout the Tennessee River for a location for the Guntersville Dam. After the dam was complete and the reservoir flooded, Bill used his boat to give tours for visitors who came to see the newly formed lake.

== Lake Theatre ==
Bill and his wife Dora owned and operated a theater in the Guntersville area called the Lake Theatre. Bill and Dora became known as "Mr. and Mrs. Entertainment". The theater would show movies and musical concerts. Some of the notable concerts featured Jerry Lee Lewis. Every Christmas Eve they would host a free show for kids.

== Waterway Journeys ==
"Mississippi" Bill was most famous for his waterway trips in his 12-foot aluminum boat he named the "Miss Guntersville Lake". The first notable trip was in 1968. The trip started in Guntersville Lake and ended in the French Quarter of New Orleans. The trip took over 5 days. Bill would call into local radio shows every morning to update everyone on his journey. He would usually travel with another person and they would sleep on boat docks at night. Bill claimed to have been shot at many times by disgruntled boat dock owners. Whenever Bill would pass through the Nashville area and he would stay on Johnny Cash's boat dock, Bill claimed Cash would sing and play guitar for him and his partner. Bill received a key to the city from many cities, most notably New Orleans. A newspaper article once said that "Mississippi Bill Harris has more keys to cities than most Presidents of the United States". Bill took a total of 23 trips over a 30-year span, heading all the way north to Chicago and as far south as New Orleans and Mobile. The total of his combined trips was 55,000 miles. He was mentioned in many river town local newspapers, which is where he got the nickname "Mississippi Bill" for traveling the Mississippi River so often.

=== List of trips ===
- 1967 - Guntersville, AL. - Knoxville, TN.
- 1968 - Guntersville, AL. - New Orleans, LA.
- 1969 - Guntersville, AL. - Nashville, TN.
- 1970 - Guntersville, AL. - Knoxville, TN.
- 1971 - Guntersville, AL. - St. Louis, MO.
- 1972 - Guntersville, AL. - New Orleans, LA - St. Louis, MO.
- 1973 - Guntersville, AL. - New Orleans, LA - St. Louis, MO. - Nashville, TN.
- 1974 - Guntersville, AL. - St. Louis, MO.
- 1975 - Guntersville, AL. - Nashville, TN.
- 1976 - Guntersville, AL. - Memphis, TN.
- 1977 - Guntersville, AL. - Little Rock, AR.
- 1978 - Guntersville, AL. - Marietta, Ohio
- 1980 - Guntersville, AL. - Saint Charles, Missouri - Nashville, TN.
- 1981 - Guntersville, AL. - Clinton, Iowa
- 1982 - Guntersville, AL. - Pittsburgh, PA
- 1983 - Guntersville, AL. - St. Louis, MO
- 1984 - Guntersville, AL. - Saint Paul, Minnesota
- 1985 - Guntersville, AL. - Nashville, TN - Demopolis, AL
- 1986 - Guntersville, AL. - Mobile, Alabama
- 1987 - Guntersville, AL. - Hopkins County, Kentucky
- 1991 - Guntersville, AL. - Paducah, Kentucky - Demopolis, AL
- 1997 - Guntersville, AL. - Chicago, IL - Lake Michigan +(on his 85th Birthday)

== Later life ==
In the 1980s Guntersville celebrated "Bill Harris Day".

Even though Bill never had children of his own, he loved kids. He was known to give every kid he met a quarter to buy candy with.

For most of Bill's later life he was usually the grand marshal of the Guntersville Christmas parade, in which he was pulled in his boat on a trailer. Equipped on the boat was a megaphone that Bill would cheer "Roll Tide" on as he rode through the parade.

== Legacy ==
A Guntersville walking trail that runs by the lake was named after Bill and his wife. The Bill and Dora Harris walking trail can be found running parallel to Sunset Drive in Guntersville. Bill's boat "Miss Guntersville Lake" can be found at the Guntersville Museum with an exhibit based on Bill and his trips. In 2004 a book was published based on Bill and his journeys, Mississippi Bill and the Indomitable Little Boat.
