= Willard Scissum =

American football player and coach (born 1962)

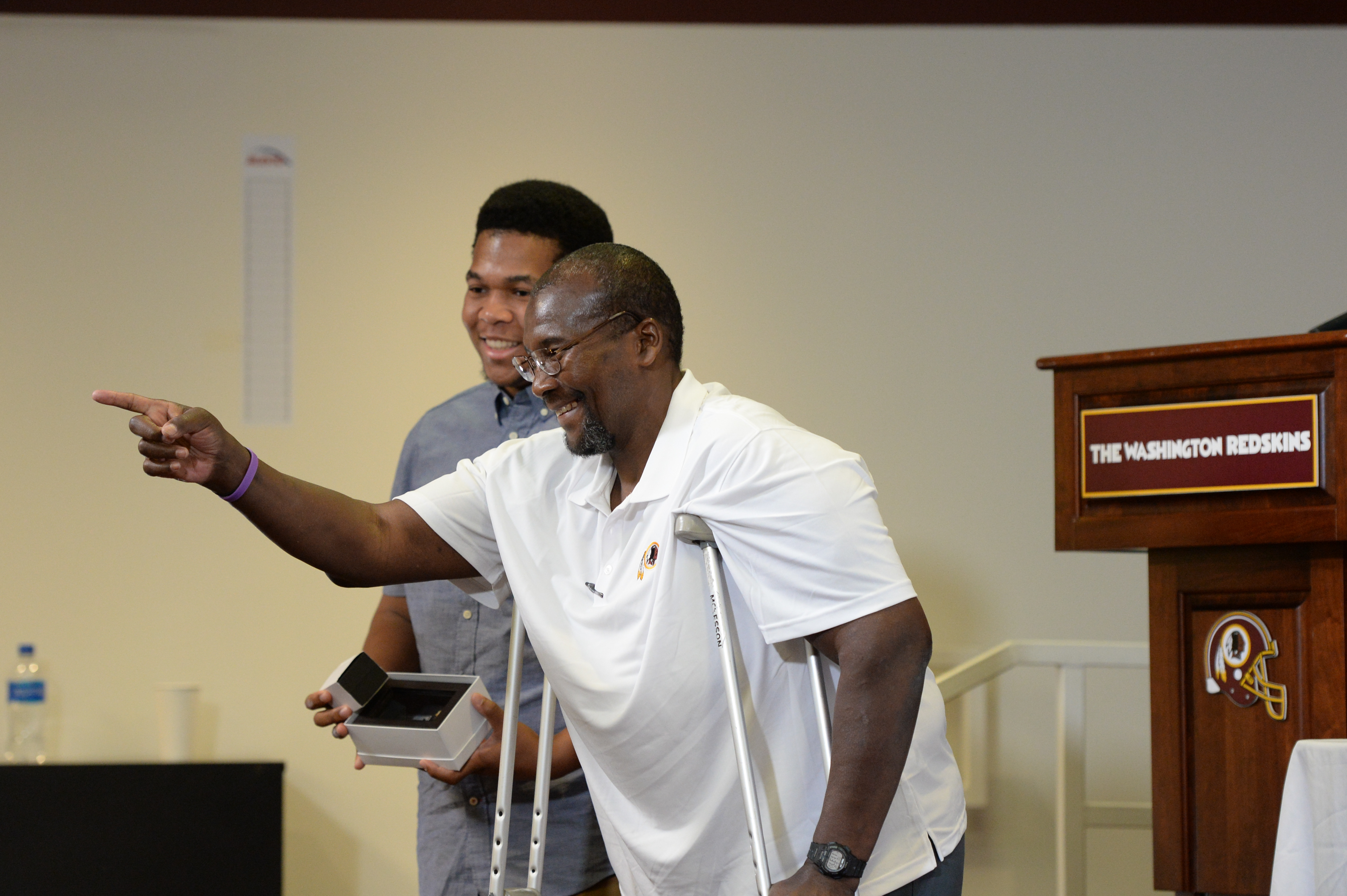
- Scissum after receiving his Super Bowl ring at a ceremony held in 2018

Biographical details
- Born: October 28, 1962 (age 64); Guntersville, Alabama, U.S.

Playing career
- 1981–1984: Alabama
- 1985: Denver Broncos*
- 1987: Washington Redskins
- Position: Tackle

Coaching career (HC unless noted)
- c. 1994: Alabama (GA)
- 1998–2000: Morehouse (OL)
- 2001: Morris Brown (co-OC)
- 2002–2004: Morehouse
- 2006–2007: Clark Atlanta (OL)
- 2007: Berlin Thunder (TE)
- 2008: Fort Valley State (OL)
- 2009–2010: Alcorn State (OL)
- 2011–2012: Alabama State (OL)
- 2013–2015: Savannah State (assoc. HC/OL)

Head coaching record
- Overall: 14–18

Willard Sebastian Scissum (born October 28, 1962) is an American football coach and former player who played as a tackle in the National Football League (NFL) for the Washington Redskins in the 1987 NFL season. He played college football at Alabama.

Before his stint with the Redskins, he was signed as a free agent by the Denver Broncos and played in the Canadian Football League (CFL) with the Calgary Stampeders and BC Lions. He served as the head football coach at Morehouse College from 2002 to 2004, and was last an assistant coach at Savannah State University.

In 2018, Scissum was awarded a Super Bowl ring for playing for the Redskins in 1987, the year they won Super Bowl XXII.

== Head coaching record ==
Year	Team	Overall	Conference	Standing	Bowl/playoffs
Morehouse Maroon Tigers (Southern Intercollegiate Athletic Conference) (2002–2004)
2002	Morehouse	6–5	4–4	5th	
2003	Morehouse	4–7	3–5	7th	
2004	Morehouse	4–6	3–5	6th	
Morehouse:		14–18	10–14		
Total:		14–18			
