= Guntersville City School District =

School district in Alabama, United States

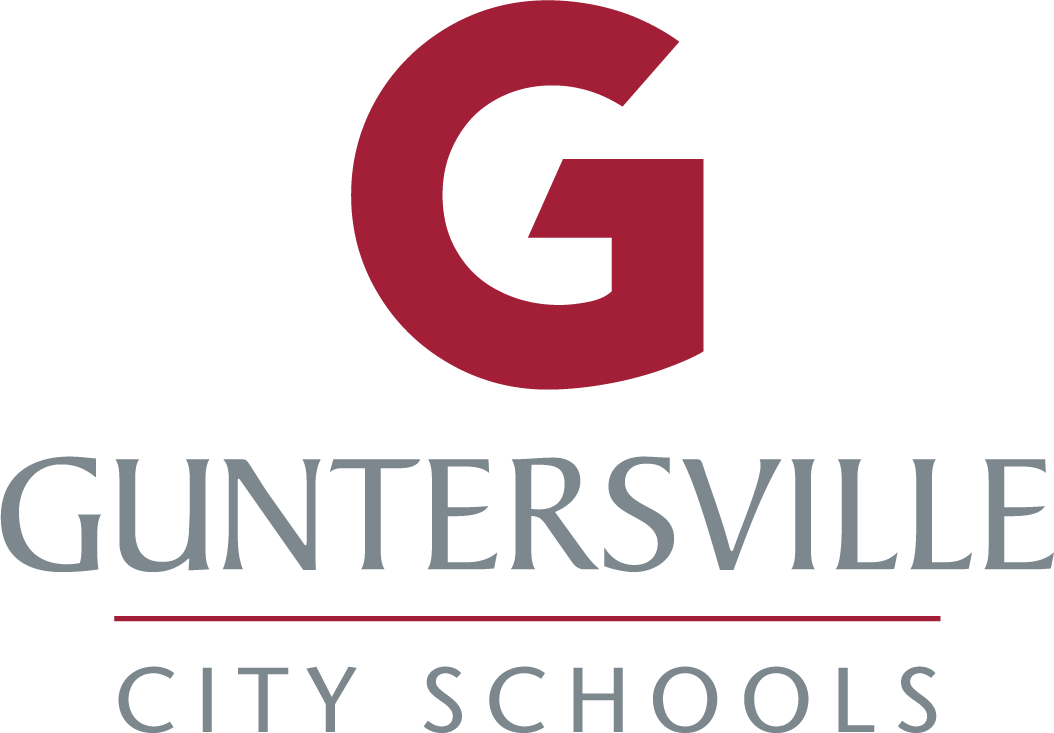

Address
- 4200 Alabama Highway 79 South Guntersville, Alabama, 35976; United States

District information
- Type: Public
- Grades: PreK–12
- NCES District ID: 0101690

Students and staff
- Students: 1,824
- Teachers: 109.56
- Staff: 98.5
- Student–teacher ratio: 16.65

Other information
- Website: www.guntersvilleboe.com

Guntersville City School District is a school district in Marshall County, Alabama.

== Schools ==
The Guntersville City School District consists of four schools:

- Guntersville Elementary School (PreK-2)
- Cherokee Elementary School (3-5)
- Guntersville Middle School (6-8)
- Guntersville High School (9-12)

== Superintendent ==
The current Superintendent is Dr. Brad Cooper, who took office on January 1, 2026.
