= Arab City Schools =

School district in Arab, Alabama, United States

Address
- 750 Arabian Dr NE Arab, Alabama, 35016; United States
- Coordinates: 34°19′41″N 86°29′15″W

District information
- Grades: Pre-K through 12
- Superintendent: Johnny Berry
- NCES District ID: 0100100

Students and staff
- Enrollment: 2,609 (2020-2021)
- Staff: 158.11 (on an FTE basis)
- Student–teacher ratio: 16.50

Other information
- Website: www.arabcityschools.org

Arab City Schools is the public school district of Arab, Alabama.

== Schools ==
It includes the following schools:

- Arab High School
- Arab Junior High School
- Arab Primary School
- Arab Elementary School

Arab City Schools has a total enrollment of approximately 2,609 students.
