= Red Apple, Alabama =

- Ghost town
- Location within Alabama Location within the United States
- Coordinates: 34°10′57″N 86°12′02″W
- Country: United States
- State: Alabama
- County: Marshall
- Elevation: 1,014 ft (309 m)
- Time zone: UTC-6 (Central (CST))
  - Summer (DST): UTC-5 (CDT)
- Area codes: 256 & 938
- GNIS feature ID: 139469

Red Apple is a ghost town in Marshall County, in the U.S. state of Alabama.

== History ==
A post office called Red Apple was established in 1870, and remained in operation until it was discontinued in 1903. The community was named from an apple orchard near the town site.
