= Guntersville, Alabama =

City in Alabama, United States

- City
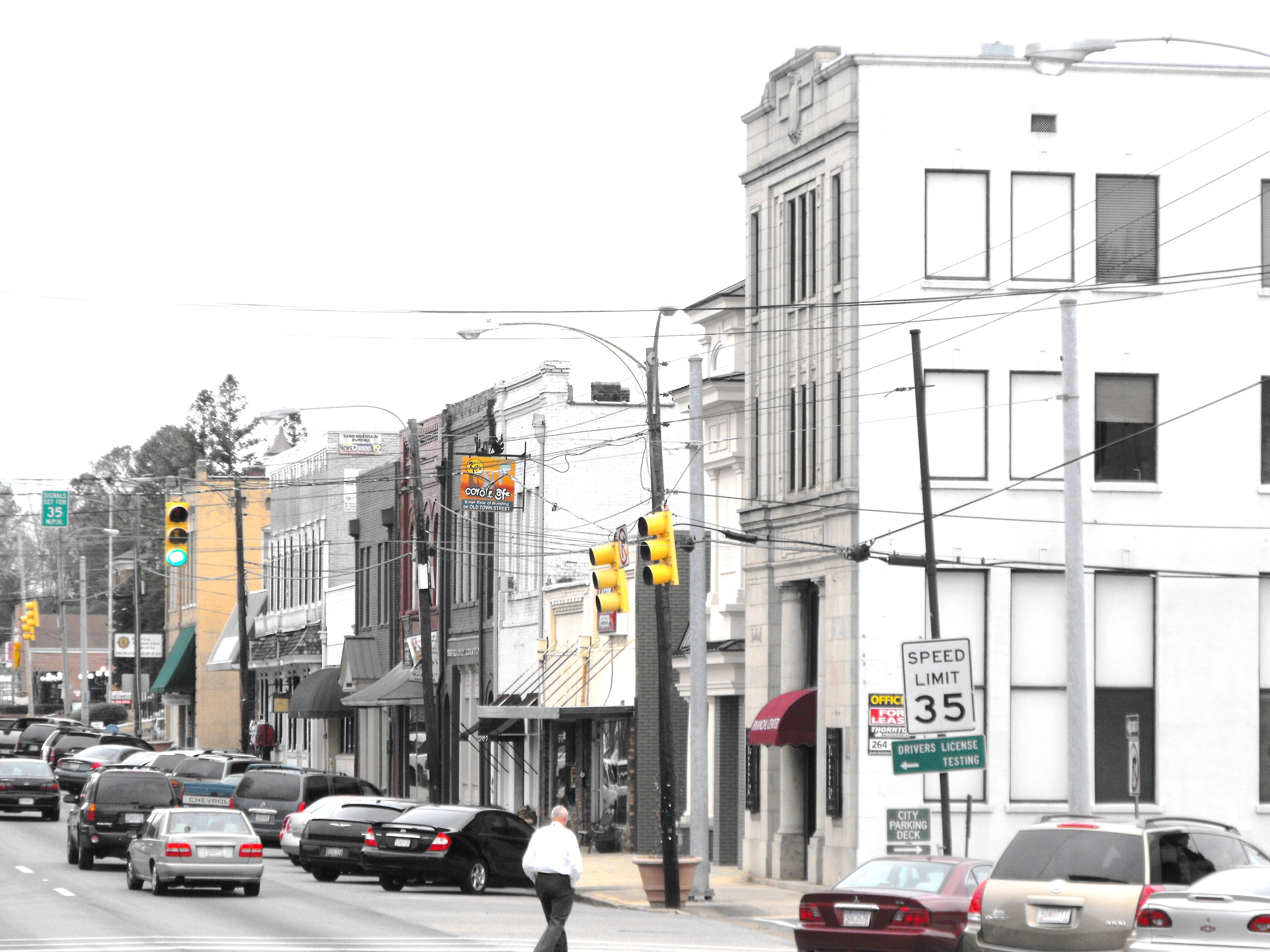
- Looking southwest on US 431 in downtown Guntersville in 2009

- Logo

- Location in Marshall County, Alabama
- Coordinates: 34°23′40″N 86°14′20″W
- Country: United States
- State: Alabama
- County: Marshall

Government
  - Mayor: Leigh Dollar

Area
  - Total: 42.70 sq mi (110.59 km^{2})
  - Land: 25.63 sq mi (66.39 km^{2})
  - Water: 17.06 sq mi (44.19 km^{2})
- Elevation: 607 ft (185 m)

Population (2020)
  - Total: 8,553
  - Density: 333.6/sq mi (128.82/km^{2})
- Time zone: UTC−6 (Central (CST))
  - Summer (DST): UTC−5 (CDT)
- ZIP Code: 35976
- Area code: 256
- FIPS code: 01-32416
- GNIS feature ID: 2403774
- Website: guntersvilleal.org

Guntersville (previously known as Gunter's Ferry and later Gunter's Landing) is a city and the county seat of Marshall County, Alabama, United States. At the 2020 census, the population of the city was 8,553. Guntersville is located in a HUBZone as identified by the U.S. Small Business Administration (SBA).

== History ==
Guntersville was founded by John Gunter (1765–1835), the great-grandfather of American humorist Will Rogers. Gunter's own great-great-grandfather, of Welsh-English descent, had emigrated to the New World in 1644. Gunter was the wealthy owner of a salt mine in the early 19th century. In order to obtain more land to mine, Gunter struck a deal with the Cherokee tribe that inhabited the area to use in his household as servants. As part of the deal, Gunter married the daughter (Ghe-No-He-Li, aka Katy and Cathrine) of the tribe's chief (Chief Bushyhead of the Paint Clan) and agreed to give salt to the tribe. A town sprung up next to the mine and was named after Gunter. The town of Guntersville puts on a festival every July to celebrate Will Rogers, which involves many activities which were of interest to Rogers.

Initially incorporated as "Gunter's Landing" in 1848, it won the contest to become county seat from Warrenton (which had been the seat since 1841). It formally changed its name to Guntersville in 1854.

The United States Navy began operating a fleet of gunboats on the Tennessee River in late 1864. Confederate troops mounted a spirited defense of the river from Guntersville. In January 1865, the USS General Grant attempted to destroy the town in retaliation.

For much of the 20th century, the economy of Guntersville revolved around cotton processing, especially with the Saratoga Victory Mill.

== Geography ==
Guntersville is located in central Marshall County. U.S. Route 431 (Gunter Avenue and Blount Avenue) is the main road through the city, leading northwest 37 miles (60 km) to Huntsville, and southeast 10 miles (16 km) to Albertville. Gadsden is 36 miles (58 km) to the southeast via US 431.

According to the U.S. Census Bureau, the city of Guntersville has a total area of 42.7 square miles (110.6 km^{2}), of which 25.6 square miles (66.4 km^{2}) are land and 17.1 square miles (44.2 km^{2}), or 40.0%, are water. Guntersville is located at the southernmost point of the Tennessee River on Lake Guntersville, formed by the Guntersville Dam (built by the Tennessee Valley Authority). Geologically, the lake occupies a southern extension of the Sequatchie Valley, which continues south as Browns Valley.

=== Climate ===
Climate data for Guntersville, Alabama, 1991–2020 normals, extremes 1910–present
Month	Jan	Feb	Mar	Apr	May	Jun	Jul	Aug	Sep	Oct	Nov	Dec	Year
Record high °F (°C)	78 (26)	82 (28)	88 (31)	94 (34)	99 (37)	103 (39)	106 (41)	105 (41)	102 (39)	99 (37)	87 (31)	78 (26)	106 (41)
Mean maximum °F (°C)	69.1 (20.6)	72.7 (22.6)	79.2 (26.2)	84.2 (29.0)	88.8 (31.6)	93.6 (34.2)	95.6 (35.3)	95.7 (35.4)	92.8 (33.8)	85.6 (29.8)	77.0 (25.0)	70.0 (21.1)	97.3 (36.3)
Mean daily maximum °F (°C)	50.4 (10.2)	54.8 (12.7)	63.3 (17.4)	71.9 (22.2)	79.5 (26.4)	86.1 (30.1)	88.9 (31.6)	88.7 (31.5)	83.9 (28.8)	73.6 (23.1)	62.0 (16.7)	53.3 (11.8)	71.4 (21.9)
Daily mean °F (°C)	41.8 (5.4)	45.3 (7.4)	53.0 (11.7)	61.2 (16.2)	69.6 (20.9)	77.1 (25.1)	80.3 (26.8)	79.9 (26.6)	74.7 (23.7)	63.5 (17.5)	52.1 (11.2)	44.8 (7.1)	61.9 (16.6)
Mean daily minimum °F (°C)	33.1 (0.6)	35.8 (2.1)	42.8 (6.0)	50.4 (10.2)	59.7 (15.4)	68.1 (20.1)	71.6 (22.0)	71.1 (21.7)	65.4 (18.6)	53.5 (11.9)	42.3 (5.7)	36.3 (2.4)	52.5 (11.4)
Mean minimum °F (°C)	15.9 (−8.9)	20.9 (−6.2)	26.4 (−3.1)	35.5 (1.9)	45.8 (7.7)	59.4 (15.2)	64.8 (18.2)	63.5 (17.5)	52.6 (11.4)	37.8 (3.2)	27.9 (−2.3)	22.3 (−5.4)	14.1 (−9.9)
Record low °F (°C)	−11 (−24)	−2 (−19)	11 (−12)	25 (−4)	36 (2)	44 (7)	48 (9)	48 (9)	38 (3)	26 (−3)	7 (−14)	−2 (−19)	−11 (−24)
Average precipitation inches (mm)	5.31 (135)	5.40 (137)	5.65 (144)	4.99 (127)	4.56 (116)	4.73 (120)	4.31 (109)	4.02 (102)	4.16 (106)	3.48 (88)	4.19 (106)	5.97 (152)	56.77 (1,442)
Average snowfall inches (cm)	0.1 (0.25)	0.5 (1.3)	0.1 (0.25)	0.0 (0.0)	0.0 (0.0)	0.0 (0.0)	0.0 (0.0)	0.0 (0.0)	0.0 (0.0)	0.0 (0.0)	0.0 (0.0)	0.0 (0.0)	0.7 (1.8)
Average precipitation days (≥ 0.01 in)	11.9	12.4	12.5	10.7	10.3	10.9	11.4	9.9	7.8	7.7	9.9	12.7	128.1
Average snowy days (≥ 0.1 in)	0.1	0.2	0.2	0.0	0.0	0.0	0.0	0.0	0.0	0.0	0.0	0.1	0.6
Source 1: NOAA
Source 2: National Weather Service

== Demographics ==
Historical population
Census	Pop.	Note	%±
1870	244		—
1880	325		33.2%
1890	471		44.9%
1900	618		31.2%
1910	1,145		85.3%
1920	1,909		66.7%
1930	2,826		48.0%
1940	4,398		55.6%
1950	5,253		19.4%
1960	6,592		25.5%
1970	6,491		−1.5%
1980	7,041		8.5%
1990	7,038		0.0%
2000	7,395		5.1%
2010	8,197		10.8%
2020	8,553		4.3%
U.S. Decennial Census; 2013 Estimate

=== Racial and ethnic composition ===
Guntersville city, Alabama – Racial and ethnic composition Note: the US Census treats Hispanic/Latino as an ethnic category. This table excludes Latinos from the racial categories and assigns them to a separate category. Hispanics/Latinos may be of any race. Race and ethnicity were not reported in Alabama for populations under 2,500 in 1980 and under 1,000 in 1990.
Race / Ethnicity (NH = Non-Hispanic)	Pop 1980	Pop 1990	Pop 2000	Pop 2010	Pop 2020	% 1980	% 1990	% 2000	% 2010	% 2020
White alone (NH)	6,191	6,163	6,387	6,927	6,942	87.93%	87.57%	86.37%	84.51%	81.16%
Black or African American alone (NH)	757	789	630	639	745	10.75%	11.21%	8.52%	7.80%	8.71%
Native American or Alaska Native alone (NH)	10	31	35	34	34	0.14%	0.44%	0.47%	0.41%	0.40%
Asian alone (NH)	6	26	29	127	93	0.09%	0.37%	0.39%	1.55%	1.09%
Native Hawaiian or Pacific Islander alone (NH)	x	x	0	1	0	x	x	0.00%	0.01%	0.00%
Other race alone (NH)	12	0	7	12	16	0.17%	0.00%	0.09%	0.15%	0.19%
Mixed race or Multiracial (NH)	x	x	95	144	338	x	x	1.28%	1.76%	3.95%
Hispanic or Latino (any race)	65	29	212	313	385	0.92%	0.41%	2.87%	3.82%	4.50%
Total	7,041	7,038	7,395	8,197	8,553	100.00%	100.00%	100.00%	100.00%	100.00%

=== 2020 census ===
As of the 2020 census, Guntersville had a population of 8,553, 3,628 households, and 2,179 families. The median age was 46.1 years. 20.1% of residents were under the age of 18 and 23.2% of residents were 65 years of age or older. For every 100 females there were 91.4 males, and for every 100 females age 18 and over there were 88.2 males age 18 and over.

84.4% of residents lived in urban areas, while 15.6% lived in rural areas.

There were 3,628 households in Guntersville, of which 27.3% had children under the age of 18 living in them. Of all households, 43.0% were married-couple households, 18.6% were households with a male householder and no spouse or partner present, and 33.0% were households with a female householder and no spouse or partner present. About 33.0% of all households were made up of individuals and 16.3% had someone living alone who was 65 years of age or older.

There were 4,126 housing units, of which 12.1% were vacant. The homeowner vacancy rate was 2.4% and the rental vacancy rate was 7.7%.

=== 2010 census ===
At the 2010 census, there were 8,197 people, 3,388 households and 2,167 families living in the city. The population density was 347.3 inhabitants per square mile (134.1/km^{2}). There were 3,872 housing units at an average density of 152.4 per square mile (58.8/km^{2}). The racial makeup of the city was 85.8% White, 7.8% Black or African American, 0.5% Native American, 1.5% Asian, 0.0% Pacific Islander, 2.5% from other races, and 1.9% from two or more races. 3.8% of the population were Hispanic or Latino of any race.

There were 3,388 households, of which 25.3% had children under the age of 18 living with them, 45.9% were married couples living together, 13.8% had a female householder with no husband present, and 36.0% were non-families. Of all households, 31.8% were made up of individuals, and 14.3% had someone living alone who was 65 years of age or older. The average household size was 2.29 and the average family size was 2.87.

Age distribution was 21.0% under the age of 18, 7.4% from 18 to 24, 22.8% from 25 to 44, 28.6% from 45 to 64, and 20.2% who were 65 years of age or older. The median age was 43.9 years. For every 100 females, there were 92.5 males. For every 100 females age 18 and over, there were 96.8 males.

The median household income was $38,094, and the median family income was $57,610. Males had a median income of $39,063 versus $31,410 for females. The per capita income for the city was $23,468. About 16.9% of families and 20.5% of the population were below the poverty line, including 34.9% of those under age 18 and 19.1% of those age 65 or over.

=== 2000 census ===
At the 2000 census, there were 7,395 people, 3,061 households and 1,971 families living in the city. The population density was 312.7 inhabitants per square mile (120.7/km^{2}). There were 3,518 housing units at an average density of 148.8 per square mile (57.5/km^{2}). The racial makeup of the city was 88.17% White, 8.53% Black or African American, 0.49% Native American, 0.41% Asian, 0.01% Pacific Islander, 0.95% from other races, and 1.45% from two or more races. 2.87% of the population were Hispanic or Latino of any race.

There were 3,061 households, of which 27.5% had children under the age of 18 living with them, 47.5% were married couples living together, 13.7% had a female householder with no husband present, and 35.6% were non-families. Of all households, 32.4% were made up of individuals, and 14.4% had someone living alone who was 65 years of age or older. The average household size was 2.28 and the average family size was 2.88.

Age distribution was 22.4% under the age of 18, 7.1% from 18 to 24, 27.0% from 25 to 44, 24.3% from 45 to 64, and 19.2% who were 65 years of age or older. The median age was 41 years. For every 100 females, there were 88.8 males. For every 100 females age 18 and over, there were 84.8 males.

The median household income was $29,882, and the median family income was $39,464. Males had a median income of $36,175 versus $20,480 for females. The per capita income for the city was $18,503. About 11.2% of families and 14.2% of the population were below the poverty line, including 15.2% of those under age 18 and 16.3% of those age 65 or over.

== Recreation ==
Guntersville sits on the shore of 69,100-acre (28,000 ha) Guntersville Lake, the biggest lake in Alabama. The lake is maintained and managed by the Tennessee Valley Authority. The 2014 and 2020 Bassmaster Classic were held on Guntersville Lake.

== Government ==
The current mayor is Leigh Dollar, the daughter of a previous mayor, and the first female to hold mayor's office in Guntersville.

== Education ==
Guntersville has one school system (Guntersville City School District) in the town which is made up of four schools; Guntersville Elementary School (Kindergarten-2nd grade), Cherokee Elementary School (3rd–5th grade), Guntersville Middle School (6th–8th grade), and Guntersville High School (9th–12th grade). In 2006 Guntersville High School won the 4A football state championship, which is the only football state championship recorded by a school in Marshall County, Alabama.

== Culture ==
Guntersville was the last place in which Ricky Nelson ever performed as a singer. His last performance was at PJ's Alley in Guntersville on Monday, December 30, 1985. His private plane departed Guntersville the next day, New Year's Eve, and crashed near DeKalb, Texas.

In Hunting Mister Heartbreak: A Discovery of America, the British author Jonathan Raban becomes a temporary resident of the city, to which he takes a liking in his conservative persona as John Rayburn. He is aware, however, that were his real views known the people of Guntersville might have been less welcoming. "Scratch John Rayburn, and he'd confess my own thoughts on politics, books, religion − thoughts that wouldn't wash in Guntersville."

== Notable people ==
- Don Fuell, former Canadian Football League quarterback
- "Mississippi" Bill Harris, entrepreneur
- Jon Jefferson, documentary filmmaker and author
- M. E. Lazarus, American individualist anarchist
- Jeffrey McLaughlin, former member of the Alabama Legislature from the 27th district
- Jeanette Scissum, NASA sunspot predictor
- Willard Scissum, former offensive tackle for the Washington Redskins and coach at Savannah State University
- Joe Starnes, congressman from 1935 to 1945
- Conrad Thompson, podcast host
- Pat Upton, former lead singer and songwriter with Spiral Starecase
- John Allan Wyeth, surgeon, soldier and author
