= Guntersville High School =

Coordinates: 34.3199°N 86.3135°W

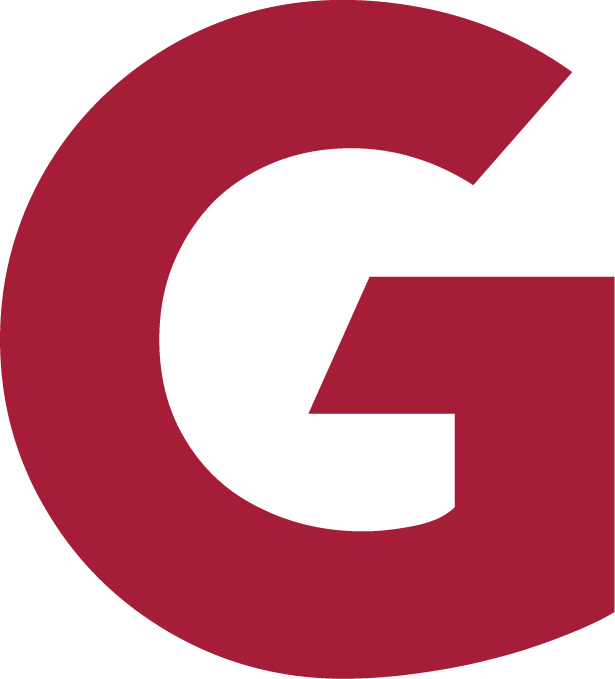

Location
- 14227 Hwy 431; Guntersville, Alabama 35976; United States

Information
- School type: Public
- School district: Guntersville City School District
- Superintendent: Brad Cooper
- CEEB code: 011340
- NCES School ID: 010169000582
- Principal: Zac Holt
- Teaching staff: 36.15 (FTE)
- Grades: 9-12
- Enrollment: 523 (2023–2024)
- Student to teacher ratio: 14.47
- Colors: Crimson and White
- Mascot: Wildcat
- Website: ghs.guntersvilleboe.com

Guntersville High School is a public high school in Guntersville, Alabama. There are more than 500 students on roll.

== History ==
Guntersville High School has existed since the 19th century. Originally, the school was intended to serve only white students. However, the school admitted its first African American student in the 1960s, following the Civil Rights movement.

The current building was constructed in 2025. The board wanted to build a new campus in 2021, but town residents voted down a tax increase that would have accomplished this in 2021. Instead Construction began in 2022.

== Demographics ==
The demographic breakdown of the 524 students enrolled for the 2023-2024 year was:

- American Indian/Alaska Native - 2.3%
- Asian - 1.1%
- African American - 8.8%
- Native Hawaiian/Pacific Islander - 1.3%
- Caucasian - 82.6%
- Two or more races - 3.82%

== Athletics ==
Guntersville High School is a member of the Alabama High School Athletic Association. Their mascot is the Wildcat, and they belong to Region 7 of Class 5A. The school has won a variety of state championship titles, including Varsity Volleyball in 2025, Varsity Boys Soccer in 2025, Varsity Girls Basketball in 2022, Indoor Track and Field in 2018, and one for football in 2006.
