= Marshall County, Alabama =

County in Alabama, United States

- County
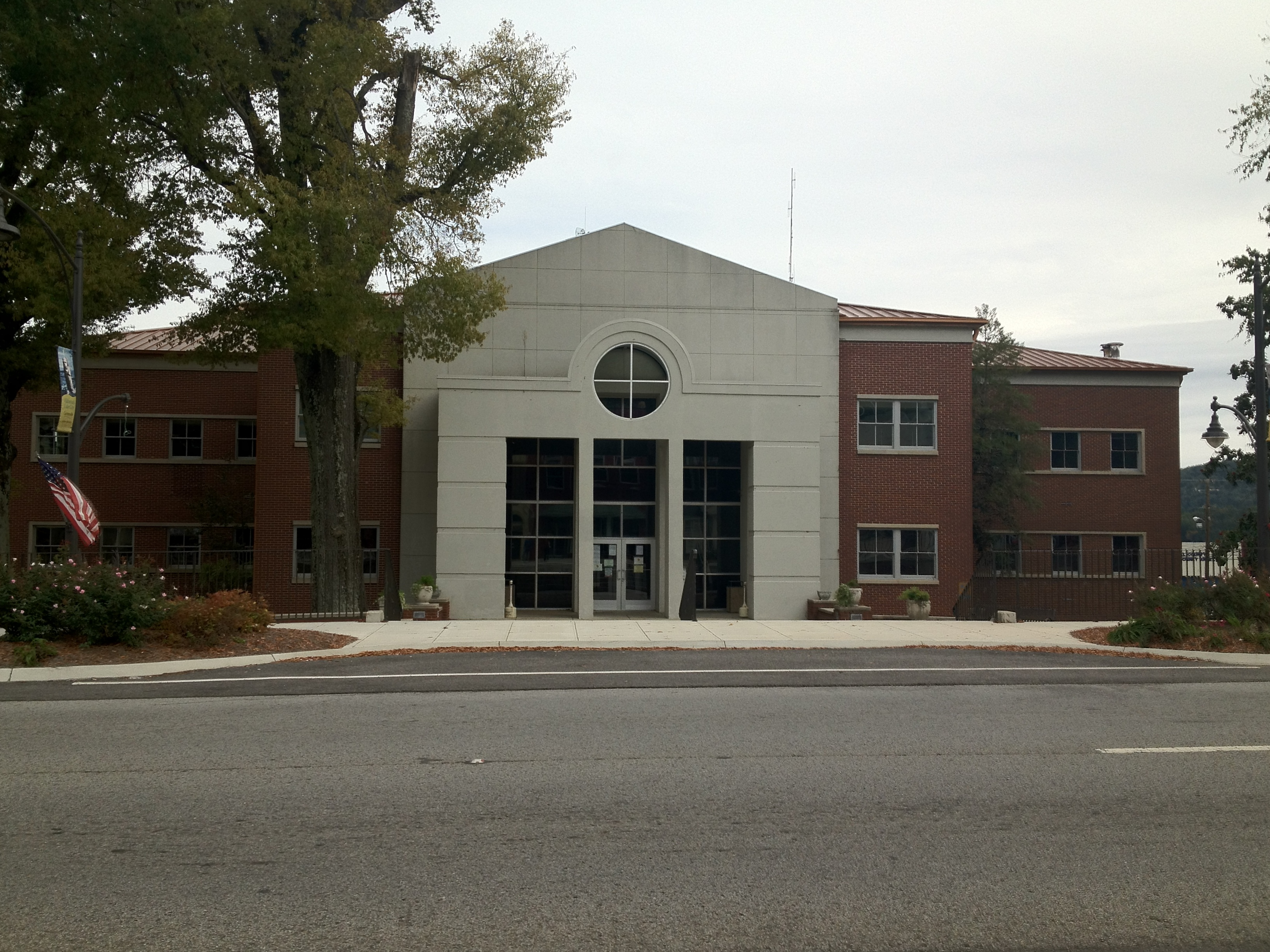
- Marshall County Courthouse in Guntersville

- Seal

- Location within the U.S. state of Alabama
- Coordinates: 34°22′05″N 86°18′14″W
- Country: United States
- State: Alabama
- Founded: January 9, 1836
- Named for: John Marshall
- Seat: Guntersville
- Largest city: Albertville

Area
  - Total: 623 sq mi (1,610 km^{2})
  - Land: 566 sq mi (1,470 km^{2})
  - Water: 57 sq mi (150 km^{2}) 9.2%

Population (2020)
  - Total: 97,612
  - Estimate (2025): 103,537 ▲
  - Density: 172/sq mi (66.6/km^{2})
- Time zone: UTC−6 (Central)
  - Summer (DST): UTC−5 (CDT)
- Congressional district: 4th
- Website: www.marshallal.gov
- County Number 50 on Alabama Licence Plates

Marshall County is a county of the state of Alabama, United States. As of the 2020 census the population was 97,612. Its county seat is Guntersville. A second courthouse is in Albertville. Its name is in honor of John Marshall, famous Chief Justice of the United States. Marshall County is a dry county, with the exception of the five cities of Albertville, Arab, Grant, Guntersville, and Boaz. Marshall County comprises the Albertville Micropolitan Statistical Area, which is also included in the Huntsville–Decatur–Albertville combined statistical area.

== History ==
Marshall County was established on January 9, 1836.

== Geography ==
According to the United States Census Bureau, the county has a total area of 623 square miles (1,610 km^{2}), of which 566 square miles (1,470 km^{2}) is land and 57 square miles (150 km^{2}) (9.2%) is water. The Tennessee River runs both north and south within the county.

=== River ===
Tennessee River

=== Adjacent counties ===
- Jackson County - northeast
- DeKalb County - east
- Etowah County - southeast
- Blount County - south
- Cullman County - southwest
- Morgan County - west
- Madison County - northwest

=== Adjacent city ===
- Huntsville - northwest

== Transportation ==
=== Major highways ===
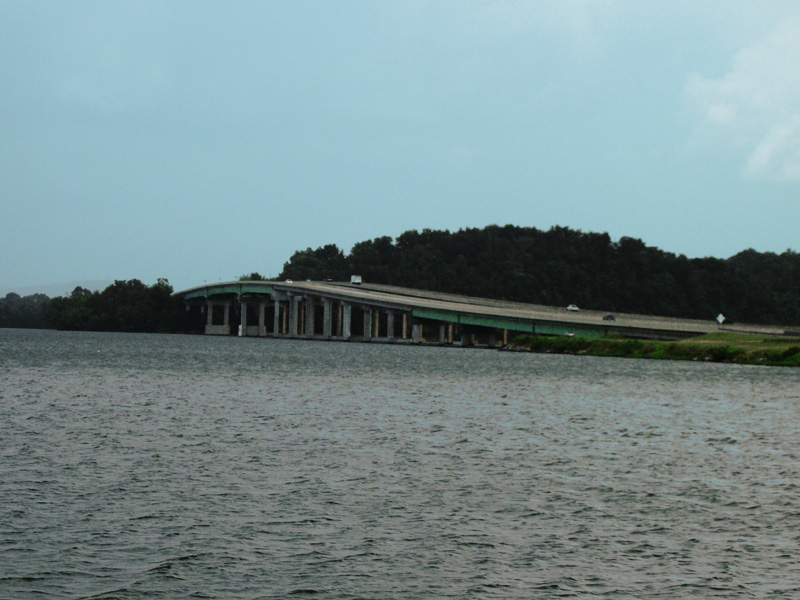
U.S. Highway 431 over the Tennessee River

- U.S. Highway 231 / State Route 53 (unsigned)
- U.S. Highway 431 / State Route 1 (unsigned)
- State Route 68
- State Route 69
- State Route 75
- State Route 79
- State Route 168
- State Route 179
- State Route 205
- State Route 227

=== Rail ===
- Alabama and Tennessee River Railway

== Demographics ==
Historical population
Census	Pop.	Note	%±
1840	7,553		—
1850	8,846		17.1%
1860	11,472		29.7%
1870	9,871		−14.0%
1880	14,585		47.8%
1890	18,935		29.8%
1900	23,289		23.0%
1910	28,553		22.6%
1920	32,669		14.4%
1930	39,802		21.8%
1940	42,395		6.5%
1950	45,090		6.4%
1960	48,018		6.5%
1970	54,211		12.9%
1980	65,622		21.0%
1990	70,832		7.9%
2000	82,231		16.1%
2010	93,019		13.1%
2020	97,612		4.9%
2025 (est.)	103,537	▲	6.1%
U.S. Decennial Census; 1790–1960 1900–1990; 1990–2000 2010–2020

=== Racial and ethnic composition ===
Marshall County, Alabama – Racial and ethnic composition Note: the US Census treats Hispanic/Latino as an ethnic category. This table excludes Latinos from the racial categories and assigns them to a separate category. Hispanics/Latinos may be of any race.
Race / Ethnicity (NH = Non-Hispanic)	Pop 1980	Pop 1990	Pop 2000	Pop 2010	Pop 2020	% 1980	% 1990	% 2000	% 2010	% 2020
White alone (NH)	64,109	69,118	75,081	78,060	74,666	97.69%	97.58%	91.30%	83.92%	76.49%
Black or African American alone (NH)	1,014	1,086	1,194	1,389	2,293	1.55%	1.53%	1.45%	1.49%	2.35%
Native American or Alaska Native alone (NH)	62	227	408	570	418	0.09%	0.32%	0.50%	0.61%	0.43%
Asian alone (NH)	66	109	196	475	579	0.10%	0.15%	0.24%	0.51%	0.59%
Native Hawaiian or Pacific Islander alone (NH)	x	x	20	63	128	x	x	0.02%	0.07%	0.13%
Other race alone (NH)	12	3	35	63	199	0.02%	0.00%	0.04%	0.07%	0.20%
Mixed race or Multiracial (NH)	x	x	641	1,161	3,671	x	x	0.78%	1.25%	3.76%
Hispanic or Latino (any race)	359	289	4,656	11,238	15,658	0.55%	0.41%	5.66%	12.08%	16.04%
Total	65,622	70,832	82,231	93,019	97,612	100.00%	100.00%	100.00%	100.00%	100.00%

=== 2020 census ===
As of the 2020 census, the county had a population of 97,612. The median age was 39.2 years. 24.7% of residents were under the age of 18 and 17.7% of residents were 65 years of age or older. For every 100 females there were 96.4 males, and for every 100 females age 18 and over there were 93.9 males age 18 and over.

The racial makeup of the county was 78.8% White, 2.5% Black or African American, 1.4% American Indian and Alaska Native, 0.6% Asian, 0.1% Native Hawaiian and Pacific Islander, 9.8% from some other race, and 6.7% from two or more races. Hispanic or Latino residents of any race comprised 16.0% of the population.

46.3% of residents lived in urban areas, while 53.7% lived in rural areas.

There were 37,257 households in the county, of which 32.4% had children under the age of 18 living with them and 26.7% had a female householder with no spouse or partner present. About 26.3% of all households were made up of individuals and 12.9% had someone living alone who was 65 years of age or older.

There were 41,245 housing units, of which 9.7% were vacant. Among occupied housing units, 70.5% were owner-occupied and 29.5% were renter-occupied. The homeowner vacancy rate was 1.5% and the rental vacancy rate was 6.5%.

=== 2010 census ===
As of the census of 2010, there were 93,019 people, 35,810 households, and 25,328 families living in the county. The population density was 164 people per square mile (63 people/km^{2}). There were 40,342 housing units at an average density of 71 units per square mile (27 units/km^{2}). The racial makeup of the county was 87.6% White, 1.6% Black or African American, 0.8% Native American, 0.5% Asian, 0.1% Pacific Islander, 7.8% from other races, and 1.7% from two or more races. 12.1% of the population were Hispanic or Latino of any race. Of the 35,810 households 30.3% had children under the age of 18 living with them, 53.4% were married couples living together, 12.1% had a female householder with no husband present, and 29.3% were non-families. 25.4% of households were one person and 11.4% were one person aged 65 or older. The average household size was 2.57 and the average family size was 3.05.

The age distribution was 25.0% under the age of 18, 8.58% from 18 to 24, 25.3% from 25 to 44, 26.0% from 45 to 64, and 14.9% 65 or older. The median age was 38.2 years. For every 100 females, there were 97.2 males. For every 100 females age 18 and over, there were 100.1 males.

The median household income was $37,661 and the median family income was $47,440. Males had a median income of $36,024 versus $27,478 for females. The per capita income for the county was $19,875. About 15.3% of families and 19.9% of the population were below the poverty line, including 30.3% of those under age 18 and 12.5% of those age 65 or over.

=== 2000 census ===
As of the census of 2000, there were 82,231 people, 32,547 households, and 23,531 families living in the county. The population density was 145 people per square mile (56 people/km^{2}). There were 36,331 housing units at an average density of 64 units per square mile (25 units/km^{2}). The racial makeup of the county was 93.38% White, 1.47% Black or African American, 0.53% Native American, 0.24% Asian, 0.04% Pacific Islander, 3.24% from other races, and 1.09% from two or more races. 5.66% of the population were Hispanic or Latino of any race. According to the census of 2000, the largest ancestry groups in Marshall County were English 68.2%, Scots-Irish 12.31%, Scottish 5.1%, Irish 4.22%, Welsh 2.3% and African 1.47%.

Of the 32,547 households 32.40% had children under the age of 18 living with them, 57.80% were married couples living together, 10.70% had a female householder with no husband present, and 27.70% were non-families. 24.60% of households were one person and 10.90% were one person aged 65 or older. The average household size was 2.50 and the average family size was 2.96.

The age distribution was 24.90% under the age of 18, 8.50% from 18 to 24, 29.00% from 25 to 44, 23.40% from 45 to 64, and 14.20% 65 or older. The median age was 37 years. For every 100 females, there were 94.80 males. For every 100 females age 18 and over, there were 91.50 males.

The median household income was $32,167 and the median family income was $38,788. Males had a median income of $30,500 versus $20,807 for females. The per capita income for the county was $17,089. About 11.70% of families and 14.70% of the population were below the poverty line, including 17.90% of those under age 18 and 19.30% of those age 65 or over.

== Religion ==
At the 2010 census:

- Southern Baptist Convention (35556)
- Catholic Church (8382)
- The United Methodist Church (6908)
- Church of God (Cleveland) (2810)
- Churches of Christ (2495)
- Assemblies of God (692)
- Episcopal Church (669)
- The Church of Jesus Christ of Latter-day Saints (609)

== Politics ==
Marshall County is a strongly Republican county. The last Democrat to win the county was Jimmy Carter in 1980.

United States presidential election results for Marshall County, Alabama
Year	Republican		Democratic		Third party(ies)	
Year	No.	%	No.	%	No.	%
1904	966	37.03%	1,336	51.21%	307	11.77%
1908	923	39.43%	1,313	56.09%	105	4.49%
1912	428	13.84%	1,457	47.11%	1,208	39.06%
1916	1,183	37.32%	1,944	61.32%	43	1.36%
1920	3,879	48.74%	4,041	50.78%	38	0.48%
1924	1,718	38.75%	2,629	59.31%	86	1.94%
1928	2,511	51.84%	2,322	47.94%	11	0.23%
1932	904	18.64%	3,836	79.09%	110	2.27%
1936	925	17.95%	4,208	81.68%	19	0.37%
1940	913	17.98%	4,142	81.55%	24	0.47%
1944	1,200	26.31%	3,356	73.58%	5	0.11%
1948	870	25.69%	0	0.00%	2,517	74.31%
1952	2,069	25.55%	6,011	74.22%	19	0.23%
1956	3,071	32.34%	6,329	66.66%	95	1.00%
1960	3,398	33.98%	6,595	65.94%	8	0.08%
1964	5,712	56.33%	0	0.00%	4,428	43.67%
1968	2,725	16.34%	955	5.73%	13,000	77.94%
1972	12,090	74.45%	3,894	23.98%	254	1.56%
1976	6,006	29.88%	13,696	68.14%	398	1.98%
1980	8,159	40.93%	10,854	54.45%	920	4.62%
1984	12,330	60.47%	7,704	37.78%	357	1.75%
1988	12,148	60.90%	7,357	36.88%	442	2.22%
1992	12,249	45.85%	10,421	39.01%	4,047	15.15%
1996	12,323	52.89%	8,722	37.43%	2,255	9.68%
2000	17,084	61.04%	10,381	37.09%	524	1.87%
2004	22,783	72.35%	8,452	26.84%	256	0.81%
2008	25,727	77.57%	7,038	21.22%	401	1.21%
2012	25,867	79.24%	6,299	19.30%	478	1.46%
2016	29,233	82.78%	4,917	13.92%	1,166	3.30%
2020	33,191	83.70%	5,943	14.99%	521	1.31%
2024	34,434	85.26%	5,553	13.75%	401	0.99%

United States Senate election results for Marshall County, Alabama2
Year	Republican		Democratic		Third party(ies)	
Year	No.	%	No.	%	No.	%
2020	32,086	81.22%	7,336	18.57%	83	0.21%

United States Senate election results for Marshall County, Alabama3
Year	Republican		Democratic		Third party(ies)	
Year	No.	%	No.	%	No.	%
2022	21,211	87.55%	2,461	10.16%	555	2.29%

Alabama Gubernatorial election results for Marshall County
Year	Republican		Democratic		Third party(ies)	
Year	No.	%	No.	%	No.	%
2022	21,345	88.06%	2,077	8.57%	818	3.37%

== Communities ==
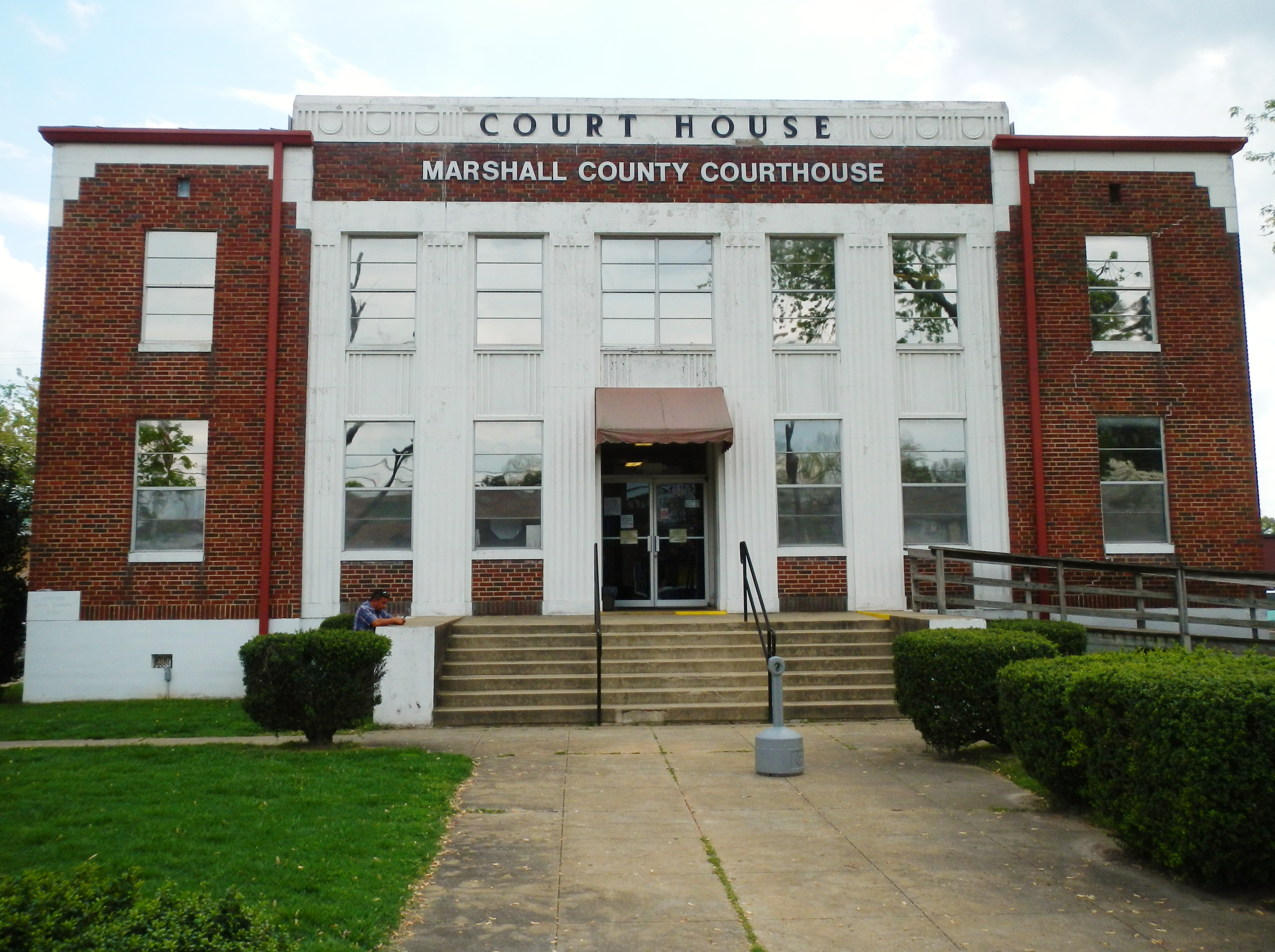
Marshall County courthouse in Albertville.

=== Cities ===
- Albertville
- Arab (partly in Cullman County)
- Boaz (partly in Etowah County)
- Guntersville (county seat)
- Huntsville (Mostly in Madison County)

=== Towns ===
- Cherokee Ridge
- Douglas
- Grant
- Union Grove

=== Census-designated place ===
- Joppa (partly in Cullman County)

=== Unincorporated communities ===
- Asbury
- Bucksnort
- Claysville
- Cottonville
- Eddy
- Egypt
- Grassy
- Hog Jaw
- Horton
- Hustleville
- Kennamer Cove
- Little New York
- Morgan City (partly in Morgan County)
- Mount Hebron
- Pinedale Shores
- Rayburn
- Red Hill
- Ruth
- Scant City
- Swearengin
- Warrenton

=== Ghost town ===
- Red Apple

== Education ==
School districts include:

- Albertville City Schools
- Marshall County Schools
- Boaz City School District
- Arab City Schools
- Guntersville City School District

== Places of interest ==
Marshall County is home to numerous outdoor recreation areas including Lake Guntersville State Park, Cathedral Caverns State Park, and Buck's Pocket State Park.

== See also ==
- National Register of Historic Places listings in Marshall County, Alabama
- Properties on the Alabama Register of Landmarks and Heritage in Marshall County, Alabama
