= Arab, Alabama =

City in Alabama, United States

- City
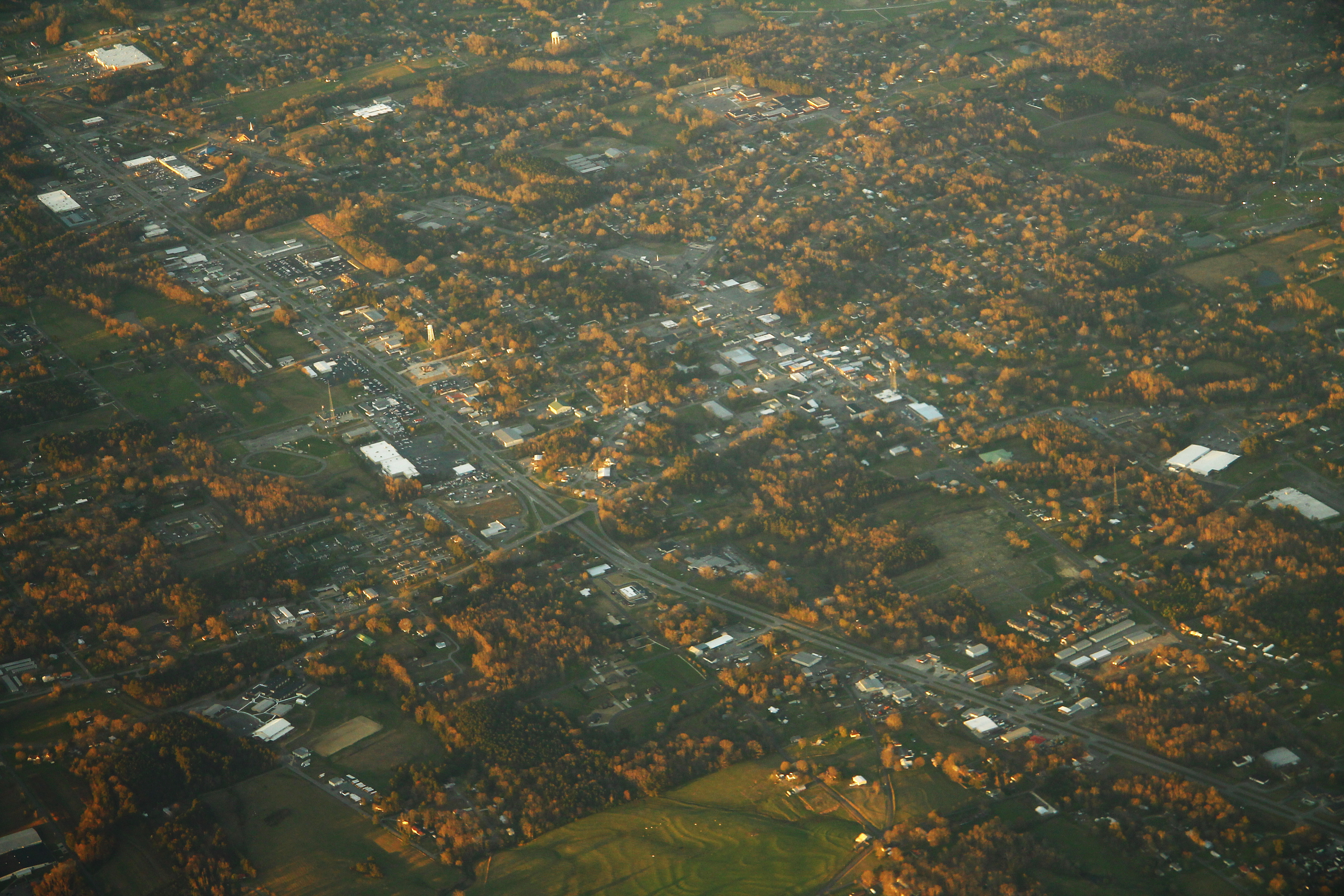
- Aerial view of Arab
- Motto: Proud of our past ... embracing the future
- Location in Marshall and Cullman counties, Alabama
- Coordinates: 34°19′52″N 86°30′35″W
- Country: United States
- State: Alabama
- Counties: Marshall, Cullman
- Incorporated: December 10, 1892
- Named for: Arad Thompson

Government
  - Type: Mayor–Council

Area
  - Total: 13.453 sq mi (34.843 km^{2})
  - Land: 13.320 sq mi (34.499 km^{2})
  - Water: 13.303 sq mi (34.454 km^{2})
- Elevation: 1,040 ft (320 m)

Population (2020)
  - Total: 8,461
  - Estimate (2022): 8,623
  - Density: 647/sq mi (249.9/km^{2})
- Time zone: UTC−6 (Central (CST))
  - Summer (DST): UTC−5 (CDT)
- ZIP Code: 35016
- Area codes: 256 and 938
- FIPS code: 01-02116
- GNIS feature ID: 2403104
- Sales tax: 12.5%
- Website: arabcity.org

Arab (/ˈeɪ.ræb/) is a city mostly in Marshall County, with a portion in Cullman County, in the northern part of the U.S. state of Alabama, located 10 miles (16 km) from Guntersville Lake and Guntersville Dam, and is included in the Huntsville-Decatur Combined Statistical Area. The population was 8,461 at the 2020 census.

== History ==
What is now Arab was established by Stephen Tuttle Thompson in the 1840s and was originally known as "Thompson's Village". The current name of the town was an unintentional misspelling by the United States Postal Service in 1882 of the city's intended name, taken from Arad Thompson, the son of the town founder, who had applied for a post office that year. "Arad" was one of three names sent to the Postal Service for consideration, the others being "Ink" and "Bird." Arab has frequently been noted on lists of unusual place names. Arab was incorporated on December 10, 1892.

Arab was a sundown town, with a sign warning Blacks not to stay in Arab after dark and, historically, even barring them during the day. Ku Klux Klan material was disseminated in Arab in 2014 and 2015.

== Geography ==
Arab is located at an elevation of 1,100 feet (340 m) on top of Brindlee Mountain, near the southwest end of the Appalachian Plateau. The city is primarily in southern Marshall County; a small portion extends south into Cullman County. U.S. Route 231 runs north-to-south through Arab, and State Route 69 runs east-to-west, through the city's business district. US 231 leads north 31 miles (50 km) to Huntsville and south 32 miles (51 km) to Oneonta, while SR 69 leads east 13 miles (21 km) to Guntersville and southwest 23 miles (37 km) to Cullman.

According to the United States Census Bureau, the city has a total area of 13.453 square miles (34.84 km^{2}), of which 13.320 square miles (34.50 km^{2}) are land and 0.133 square miles (0.34 km^{2}), or 0.99%, are water. The city lies on the Tennessee Valley Divide, with the north side draining either west to Cotaco Creek or east to Shoal Creek, both tributaries of the Tennessee River, while the south half of the city drains to the headwaters of the Mulberry Fork of the Black Warrior River, part of the Tombigbee River watershed.

== Demographics ==
=== City of Arab ===
Historical population
Census	Pop.	Note	%±
1920	264		—
1930	425		61.0%
1940	640		50.6%
1950	1,592		148.8%
1960	2,989		87.8%
1970	4,399		47.2%
1980	5,967		35.6%
1990	6,321		5.9%
2000	7,174		13.5%
2010	8,050		12.2%
2020	8,461		5.1%
2022 (est.)	8,623	▲	1.9%
U.S. Decennial Census; 2020 Census

Arab was incorporated as a town in 1892, but it did not first report a population on the census until the 1920 U.S. Census.

=== Racial and ethnic composition ===
Arab city, Alabama – Racial and ethnic composition Note: the US Census treats Hispanic/Latino as an ethnic category. This table excludes Latinos from the racial categories and assigns them to a separate category. Hispanics/Latinos may be of any race.
Race / Ethnicity (NH = Non-Hispanic)	Pop 1980	Pop 1990	Pop 2000	Pop 2010	Pop 2020	% 1980	% 1990	% 2000	% 2010	% 2020
White alone (NH)	5,949	6,282	7,020	7,714	7,630	99.70%	99.38%	97.85%	95.83%	90.18%
Black or African American alone (NH)	0	0	13	6	32	0.00%	0.00%	0.18%	0.07%	0.38%
Native American or Alaska Native alone (NH)	0	9	34	45	43	0.00%	0.14%	0.47%	0.56%	0.51%
Asian alone (NH)	7	8	28	59	105	0.12%	0.13%	0.39%	0.73%	1.24%
Native Hawaiian or Pacific Islander alone (NH)	x	x	0	6	4	x	x	0.00%	0.07%	0.05%
Other race alone (NH)	0	0	0	1	7	0.00%	0.00%	0.00%	0.01%	0.08%
Mixed race or Multiracial (NH)	x	x	32	83	336	x	x	0.45%	1.03%	3.97%
Hispanic or Latino (any race)	11	22	47	136	304	0.18%	0.35%	0.66%	1.69%	3.59%
Total	5,967	6,321	7,174	8,050	8,461	100.00%	100.00%	100.00%	100.00%	100.00%

=== 2020 census ===
As of the 2020 census, there were 8,461 people, 3,484 households, and 2,300 families residing in the city; the population density was 635.2 inhabitants per square mile (245.3/km^{2}).

The median age was 42.2 years. 22.1% of residents were under the age of 18 and 20.2% of residents were 65 years of age or older. For every 100 females there were 91.0 males, and for every 100 females age 18 and over there were 87.7 males age 18 and over.

85.5% of residents lived in urban areas, while 14.5% lived in rural areas.

Of the 3,484 households, 30.1% had children under the age of 18 living in them. Of all households, 49.7% were married-couple households, 15.9% were households with a male householder and no spouse or partner present, and 29.7% were households with a female householder and no spouse or partner present. About 29.8% of all households were made up of individuals and 15.7% had someone living alone who was 65 years of age or older.

There were 3,739 housing units, of which 6.8% were vacant. The homeowner vacancy rate was 2.2% and the rental vacancy rate was 5.3%.

=== 2010 census ===
As of the 2010 census, there were 8,050 people in 3,359 households, and 2,257 families residing in the city. The population density was 620 inhabitants per square mile (240/km^{2}). There were 3,693 housing units at an average density of 284.1 square miles (736 km^{2}). The racial makeup of the city was 96.6% White, 0.1% Black or African American, 0.6% Native American, 0.7% Asian, 0.7% from other races, and 1.1% from two or more races. 1.7% were Hispanic or Latino of any race.

Of the 3,359 households 28.9% had children under the age of 18 living with them, 50.4% were married couples living together, 13.0% had a female householder with no husband present, and 32.8% were non-families. 29.6% of households were one person and 14.9% were one person aged 65 or older. The average household size was 2.37 and the average family size was 2.92.

The age distribution was 23.7% under the age of 18, 8.3% from 18 to 24, 22.0% from 25 to 44, 27.0% from 45 to 64, and 19.1% 65 or older. The median age was 42.2 years. For every 100 females, there were 88.6 males. For every 100 females age 18 and over, there were 91.4 males.

The median household income was $42,435 and the median family income was $64,432. Males had a median income of $44,401 versus $40,062 for females. The per capita income for the city was $23,986. About 13.3% of families and 18.1% of the population were below the poverty line, including 27.7% of those under age 18 and 14.8% of those age 65 or over.

=== 2000 census ===
As of the 2000 census, there were 7,174 people in 3,012 households, and 2,075 families residing in the city. The population density was 561.8 inhabitants per square mile (216.9/km^{2}). There were 3,223 housing units at an average density of 252.4 square miles (654 km^{2}). The racial makeup of the city was 98.29% White, 0.18% Black or African American, 0.49% Native American, 0.39% Asian, 0.17% from other races, and 0.49% from two or more races. 0.66% were Hispanic or Latino of any race.

Of the 3,012 households 31.2% had children under the age of 18 living with them, 54.3% were married couples living together, 11.3% had a female householder with no husband present, and 31.1% were non-families. 28.2% of households were one person and 13.7% were one person aged 65 or older. The average household size was 2.35 and the average family size was 2.87.

The age distribution was 23.9% under the age of 18, 7.2% from 18 to 24, 27.6% from 25 to 44, 23.6% from 45 to 64, and 17.8% 65 or older. The median age was 40 years. For every 100 females, there were 87.2 males. For every 100 females age 18 and over, there were 82.8 males.

The median household income was $36,716 and the median family income was $45,761. Males had a median income of $32,425 versus $24,265 for females. The per capita income for the city was $20,035. About 8.2% of families and 10.0% of the population were below the poverty line, including 12.5% of those under age 18 and 14.9% of those age 65 or over.

=== Arab Precinct/Division (1920–) ===
Historical population
Census	Pop.	Note	%±
1920	1,474		—
1930	1,891		28.3%
1940	2,249		18.9%
1950	2,739		21.8%
1960	6,659		143.1%
1970	9,008		35.3%
1980	11,393		26.5%
1990	12,187		7.0%
2000	14,220		16.7%
2010	15,490		8.9%
2020	8,461		−45.4%
U.S. Decennial Census; 2020 Census

Arab Precinct (Marshall County 26th Precinct) first appeared on the 1920 U.S. Census. In 1960, it was changed to the Arab Census Division as part of a general reorganization of counties. The census division only includes the Marshall County portion of the town of Arab. The Cullman County portion is in the Baileyton-Joppa Census Division.

== Government ==
Arab has a mayor-council form of city government consisting of five council members and a mayor. City elections occur every four years. Council seats are at-large and are not associated with districts. Arab City Schools is the public school district. Arab has its own paid police department. Their fire department has one station, sitting on top of Marshall County 911 center. Both are paid departments.

== Infrastructure ==
=== Utilities ===
Electricity service in Arab is provided through Arab Electric Cooperative, which buys power through the Tennessee Valley Authority. Water service in Arab is provided through Arab Water Works, which gets water from Browns Creek in Guntersville Lake. Natural gas is also provided in Arab, through Marshall County Gas District, which is based out of Guntersville.

=== Transportation ===
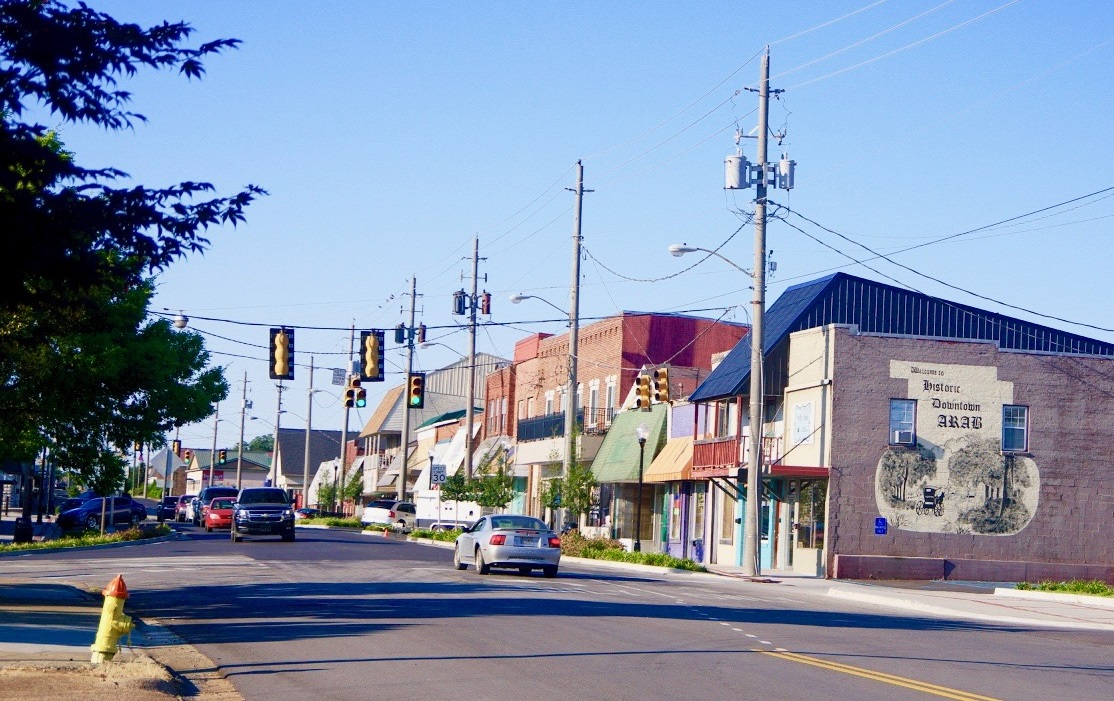
Main Street (SR 69), northbound

- U.S. Highway 231
- Alabama State Route 69

== Education ==
Residents are in the Arab City School District, regardless of county.

== Notable people ==
- Liles C. Burke, judge in the United States District Court for the Northern District of Alabama
- Vernon Derrick, fiddle and mandolin player
- Fred Nall Hollis, artist
- Jill King, singer/songwriter
- Jack Lively, Major League Baseball pitcher
- Wayne Mills, country music singer

== See also ==
- List of sundown towns in the United States
