= U.S. Route 29 =

Highway in the United States

U.S. Route 29
- US 29 highlighted in red

Route information
- Length: 1,043.3 mi (1,679.0 km)
- Existed: November 11, 1926–present

Major junctions
- South end: US 90 / US 98 at Pensacola, FL
- I-10 near Pensacola, FL; I-75 at Atlanta, GA; I-26 near Spartanburg, SC; I-77 at Charlotte, NC; I-40 at Greensboro, NC; I-85 (numerous locations); I-64 at Charlottesville, VA; I-66 (numerous locations); US 1 at Washington, DC; I-70 at Ellicott City, MD
- North end: MD 99 at Ellicott City, MD

Location
- Country: United States
- States: Florida, Alabama, Georgia, South Carolina, North Carolina, Virginia, District of Columbia, Maryland

Highway system
- United States Numbered Highway System; List; Special; Divided
| ← US 28 | → US 30 |

U.S. Route 29 or U.S. Highway 29 (US 29) is a north–south United States Numbered Highway that runs for 1,043.3 miles (1,679.0 km) from Pensacola, Florida, to Ellicott City, Maryland, just west of Baltimore, Maryland, in the Eastern United States, connecting the Florida Panhandle to the Washington–Baltimore combined statistical area. The highway takes on an overall northeast–southwest direction, from its southern terminus at US 90 and US 98 in Pensacola to its northern terminus at Maryland Route 99 (MD 99) in Ellicott City.

The section of US 29 between Greensboro, North Carolina, and Danville, Virginia, has been designated as Future Interstate 785 (Future I-785) and has received future Interstate signs in several locations along that route. It will become an official Interstate Highway once improvements have been completed.

From Auburn, Alabama, to Greensboro, I-85 runs parallel to US 29, which serves primarily as a local route along that stretch.

== Route description ==
Lengths
| | mi | km |
|---|---|---|
| FL | 43.7 | 70.3 |
| AL | 227.2 | 365.6 |
| GA | 211.0 | 339.6 |
| SC | 110.2 | 177.3 |
| NC | 168.7 | 271.5 |
| VA | 248.0 | 399.1 |
| DC | 8.6 | 13.8 |
| MD | 25.9 | 41.7 |
| Total | 1,043.3 | 1,679.0 |

=== Florida ===
US 29 begins at US 90 and US 98 in downtown Pensacola, Florida. Throughout the state, US 29 is twinned with the unsigned State Road 95 (SR 95).

The entire route in Florida runs within Escambia County. From its terminus north to SR 296, it is known as North Palafox Street. From this point, it is known as Pensacola Boulevard north to Ten Mile Road, approximately 1 mile (1.6 km) north of US 90 Alternate. Between SR 296 and the Molino community, US 29 runs parallel to its former routing, which is now County Road 95A. This former routing continues the name North Palafox Street from SR 296 north to Ten Mile Road.

=== Alabama ===
US 29, internally designated by the Alabama Department of Transportation (ALDOT) as State Route 15 (SR 15), is a southwest-northeast state highway across the southeastern part of the U.S. state of Alabama. SR 15 ends in Brewton at a junction with US 31 (SR 3) and SR 41, but US 29 continues west with US 31/SR 3 to Flomaton and south on SR 113 to the Florida state line.

US 29/SR 15 traverses Alabama in a general northeast–southwest path. It has never been a major route in the state; its significance was completely overshadowed with the completion of I-65 and I-85 during the 1970s. Today, US 29/SR 15 serves primarily to connect numerous smaller towns and cities in the southwest, south-central, and eastern parts of Alabama, notably passing near Troy, Tuskegee, and Auburn universities in the east.

US 29 no longer passes through downtown Auburn or downtown Opelika. The U.S. Highway is concurrent with I-85 from exit 51, south of Auburn, to exit 64, northeast of Opelika. This change was made by ALDOT in the 1990s. Route markers have been appropriately relocated since then.

=== Georgia ===
US 29 passes through the northern portion of Georgia, starting in Hart County toward Athens and Gwinnett County and then onward to Atlanta. The highway passes by notable universities, such as Georgia Tech and Emory University in Atlanta and the University of Georgia in Athens. US 29 meanders through Hartwell and the Lake Hartwell region near the South Carolina border. From West Point, (just south of LaGrange) at the Alabama–Georgia state line to Downtown Atlanta, SR 8 and SR 14 are paired with US 29 at various points in the state. US 29 to the southwest of Atlanta has been named Roosevelt Highway, since Franklin D. Roosevelt made his final journey northward from Warm Springs along this stretch of highway. Large crowds gathered along US 29 on this day in April 1945 to pay their final respects to the deceased president. Unfortunately, for those who waited along the highway, they missed seeing the president's body being transported back to Washington, DC, on a train that ran on nearby tracks.

=== South Carolina ===
In South Carolina, US 29 maintains a northeasterly routing, passing through Anderson, Greenville, and Spartanburg.

From Greenville through Greer, US 29 is known as Wade Hampton Boulevard. It is a major commercial artery for both Greer and Taylors. A six-lane highway, the road forms the western border of Bob Jones University and then passes near Chick Springs, a mineral springs that served as the focus of a small but important resort community during the 19th century.

US 29 was built as the main highway between Greenville and the other city of northwestern South Carolina, Spartanburg. The construction of I-85, connecting Greenville to Spartanburg, left US 29 underused until recent decades.

=== North Carolina ===
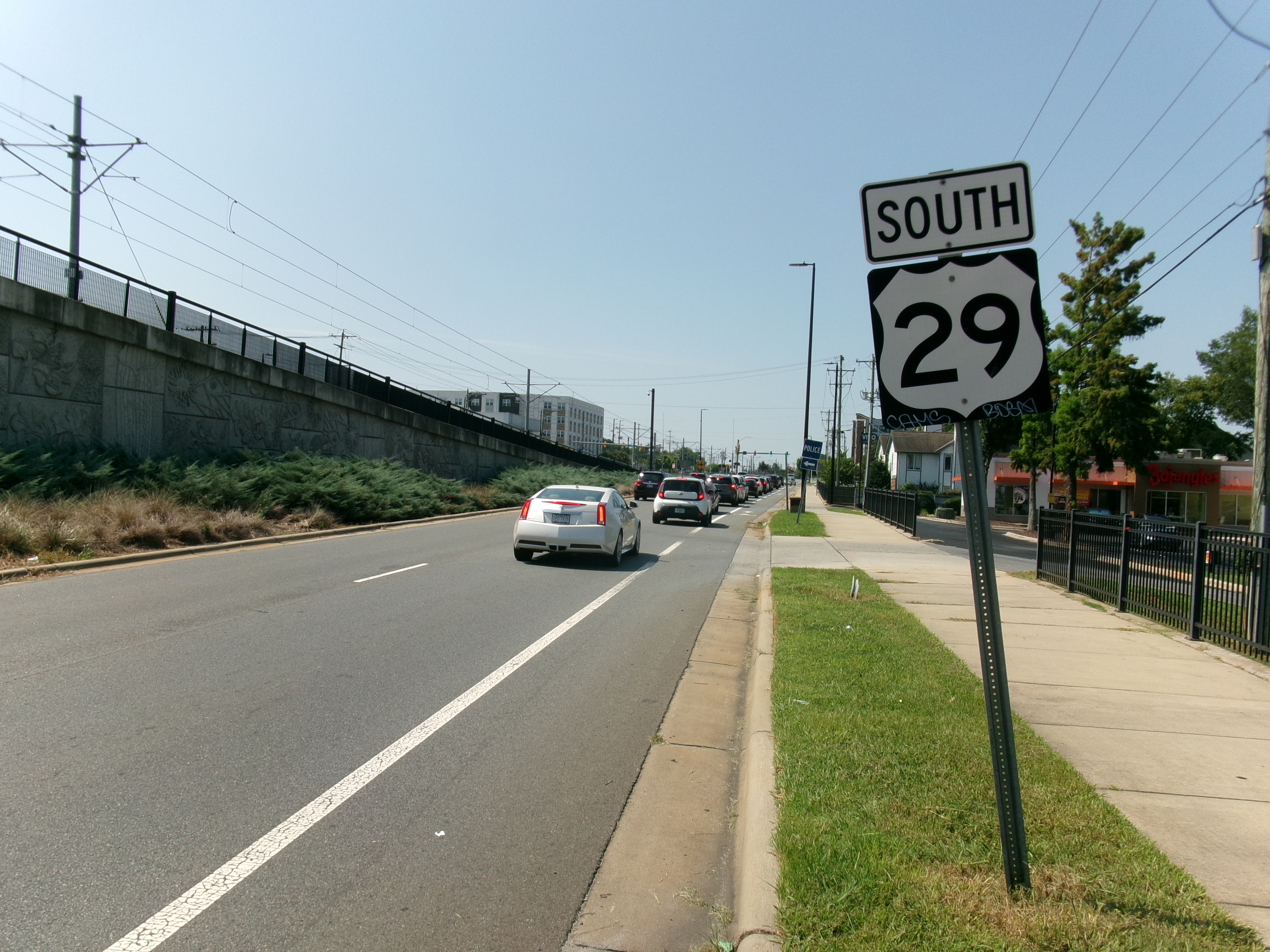
View south along US 29 past the NC 24 junction in northeast Charlotte

In North Carolina, US 29 connects the cities of Gastonia, Charlotte, Concord, Salisbury, High Point, Greensboro, and Reidsville. US 29 routes through Charlotte along Tryon Street, one of the main arteries that runs through Uptown Charlotte. NASCAR's Charlotte Motor Speedway is on US 29 where Charlotte and Concord border. After leaving the Charlotte metropolitan area, the road stays parallel with I-85 and concurrent with US 70 and serves as a secondary highway for cities along the Interstate. It stays parallel with I-85 for another 40 miles (64 km) before branching off in Greensboro and heading north towards Reidsville and then to Virginia towards Danville. US 29 from Lexington to the Virginia border is considered to be a controlled-access highway.

=== Virginia ===
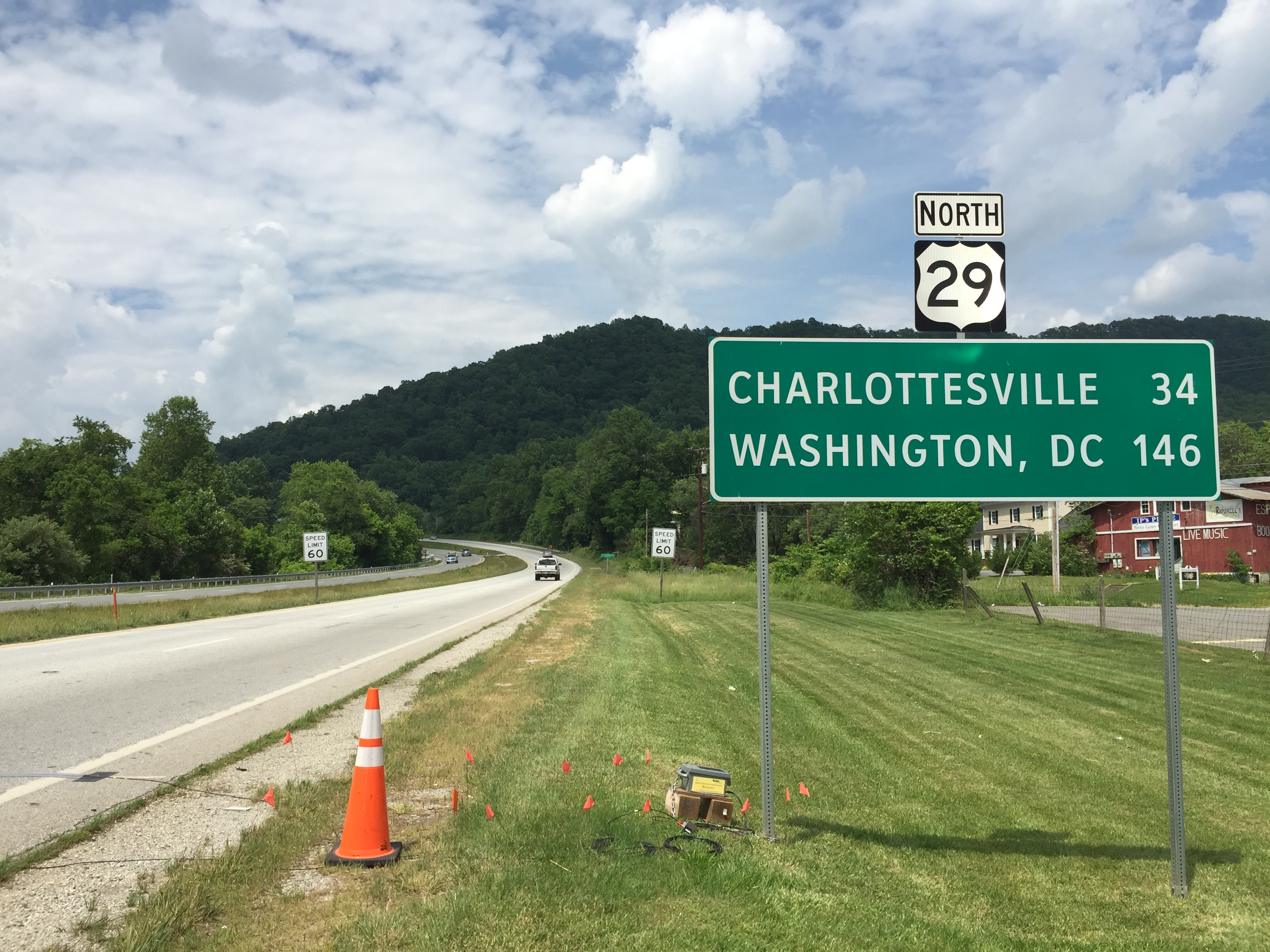
View north along US 29 at US 29 Bus. in Lovingston, Virginia

In Virginia, part of US 29 is named the Lee Highway. US 29 connects the historic small cities and large towns of west-central Virginia, including Danville, Lynchburg, Charlottesville, Culpeper, and Warrenton, with Fairfax, Falls Church, Arlington, and Washington, DC, to the northeast and with North Carolina to the southwest.

Along its route in Virginia, US 29 provides significant access to and from several major colleges and universities, including the University of Virginia in Charlottesville, George Mason University in Fairfax, Sweet Briar College in Sweet Briar, and Liberty University, University of Lynchburg, and Randolph College in Lynchburg.

=== District of Columbia ===
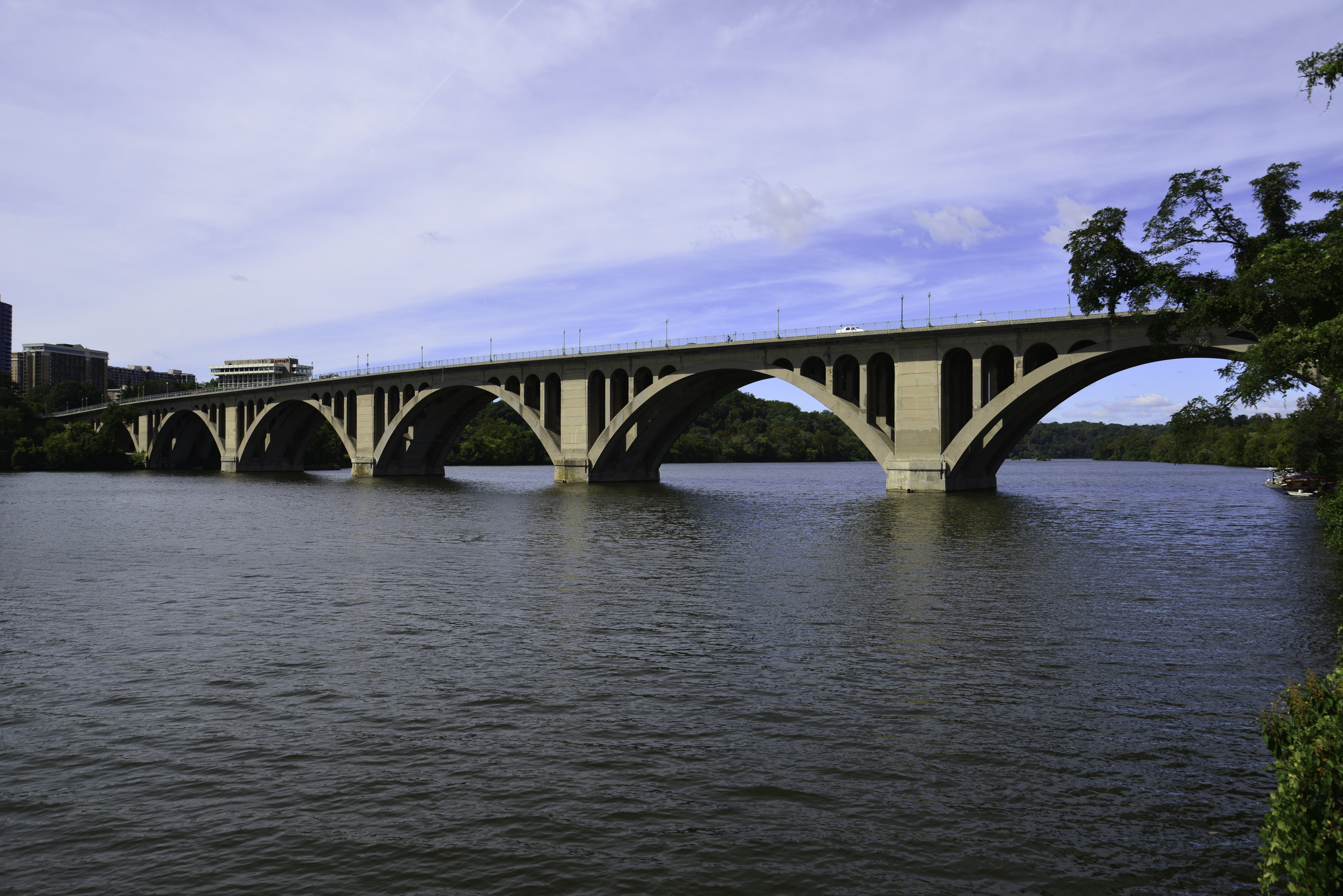
Key Bridge, carrying US 29 into Washington, D.C.

US 29 enters Washington, DC, via the Key Bridge adjacent to Georgetown University. The designation turns east onto the Whitehurst Freeway, bypassing Georgetown to the south. Upon crossing Rock Creek, the freeway ends, becoming the at-grade K Street. US 29 remains on K Street to 11th Street, where US 29 turns north onto 11th for seven blocks. At Rhode Island Avenue, US 29 turns right. US 29 northbound turns left at 6th Street (touching US 1 where it turns from Rhode Island Avenue to 6th Street); it follows 6th Street for two blocks and then turns left onto Florida Avenue, where it then turns right onto Georgia Avenue. US 29 southbound at this point, however, follows 7th Street to Rhode Island Avenue. The route maintains a northerly routing as it passes through northern Washington, DC, and enters Maryland. During its alignment with Georgia Avenue, US 29 bypasses the Howard University campus to the west.

=== Maryland ===
In Maryland, US 29 turns northeast onto Colesville Road, intersects the Capital Beltway (I-495), becomes Columbia Pike, and intersects New Hampshire Avenue (MD 650), MD 200 (Intercounty Connector), MD 198, MD 32, MD 175, MD 100, Maryland Route 103, US 40, and I-70 before terminating at MD 99 in northern Ellicott City.

== History ==
A US 29 shield used in Florida prior to 1993

=== Manassas area ===
Warrenton Turnpike is the former name of US 29 through Prince William County, Virginia. This is the name that was used for this road during the U.S. Civil War. Although the road has been expanded past Manassas into four lanes, it remains a rural two lane highway through Manassas National Battlefield Park, where I-66 carries through traffic. On either side of the road through the battlefield, split rail fences define property borders.

=== U.S. Route 170 ===
U.S. Route 170
- Location: Charlotte, North Carolina–Lynchburg, Virginia
- Existed: 1926–1931

U.S. Route 170 (US 170) was the portion of US 29 from US 70 at Charlotte, North Carolina, northeast to Lynchburg, Virginia, from 1926 until 1931, when US 29 became part of the route. The US 170 designation was then removed and the route remained as US 29 only.

== Future ==
The freeway stretch of US 29 traveling southwest from Greensboro to Lexington, North Carolina, is currently also signed as I-85 Business (I-85 Bus.) and US 70. On October 5, 2019, the North Carolina Department of Transportation submitted an application to American Association of State Highway and Transportation Officials, and was granted approval, for the removal of the I-85 Bus. designation from the freeway, and the rerouting of US 70 between Greensboro and Thomasville, leaving US 29 on the route. This plan, according to the state, will simplify overhead signage on the freeway and eliminate the confusion between I-85 and I-85 Bus.

== Major intersections ==
Florida
US 90 / US 98 in Pensacola
I-10 on the Brent–Ensley line
Alabama
US 31 in Flomaton. The highways travel concurrently to Brewton.
US 84 in Andalusia. The highways travel concurrently through the city.
US 331 in Brantley. The highways travel concurrently to Luverne.
US 231 in Troy
US 82 in Union Springs. The highways travel concurrently through the city.
US 80 in Tuskegee. The highways travel concurrently to Tuskegee National Forest.
I-85 in Auburn. The highways travel concurrently to Opelika.
US 280 in Opelika. The highways travel concurrently through the city.
US 280 / US 431 in Opelika
I-85 on the Valley–Lanett city line
Georgia
US 27 in LaGrange. The highways travel concurrently through the city.
I-85 in Grantville
I-85 south of East Newnan
I-285 southwest of College Park
US 19 / US 41 in Atlanta. The highways travel concurrently through the city.
US 78 / US 278 in Atlanta. US 29/US 78 travel concurrently to the Scottdale–North Decatur city line. US 29/US 278 travel concurrently to Druid Hills.
US 23 in Atlanta. The highways travel concurrently to Decatur.
I-285 in Tucker
US 78 southeast of Bogart. The highways travel concurrently to Athens.
US 129 / US 441 in Athens. The highways travel concurrently through the city.
South Carolina
US 76 / US 178 in Anderson. The highways travel concurrently through the city.
I-85 west of Piedmont. The highways travel concurrently to south-southwest of Dunean.
I-85 / I-185 south-southwest of Dunean
US 25 south-southwest of Dunean
US 123 in Greenville
I-85 in Startex
I-26 west of Spartanburg
I-85 northeast of Blacksburg
North Carolina
I-85 southwest of Kings Mountain. The highways travel concurrently through the city.
I-85 / US 74 in Kings Mountain. US 29/US 74 travel concurrently to Charlotte.
US 321 in Gastonia
I-485 west of Charlotte
I-77 / US 21 in Charlotte
I-277 in Charlotte
I-485 northeast of Charlotte
US 601 in Concord. The highways travel concurrently through the city.
I-85 / US 601 in Concord
US 70 / US 601 in Salisbury. US 29/US 70 travel concurrently to Thomasville.
I-85 / US 52 northeast of Spencer. The highways travel concurrently to Lexington.
US 64 in Lexington. The highways travel concurrently through the city.
US 70 in Thomasville
I-74 in High Point
I-85 south-southwest of Greensboro. The highways travel concurrently to southwest of Greensboro.
I-73 / US 421 in Greensboro
I-40 / US 220 in Greensboro. The highways travel concurrently through the city.
US 70 / US 220 in Greensboro.
I-785 / I-840 in Greensboro
US 158 east of Reidsville
Virginia
US 58 on the Virginia state line at Danville. The highways travel concurrently through the city.
US 58 / US 360 in Danville
US 460 south of Lynchburg. The highways travel concurrently to east of Lynchburg.
US 501 in Lynchburg. The highways travel concurrently through the city.
US 60 in Amherst
I-64 west-southwest of Charlottesville
US 250 west-northwest of Charlottesville. The highways travel concurrently to Charlottesville.
US 33 in Ruckersville
US 15 south-southwest of Culpeper. The highways travel concurrently to Gainesville.
US 522 south-southeast of Culpeper
US 17 in Opal. The highways travel concurrently to Warrenton.
I-66 in Gainesville
I-66 in Centreville
US 50 in Fairfax. The highways travel concurrently through the city.
I-495 on the Merrifield–West Falls Church city line
I-66 in Arlington
I-66 in Arlington
I-66 in Arlington
District of Columbia
I-66 in Washington, DC
US 1 in Washington
Maryland
I-495 in Silver Spring
US 40 in Ellicott City
I-70 in Ellicott City
MD 99 in Ellicott City

== See also ==
- Special routes of U.S. Route 29
- U.S. Route 129

Browse numbered routes
| ← US 27 | FL | → SR 29 |
| ← I-95 | SR 95 | → SR 97 |
| ← SR 28 | AL | → SR 30 |
