= U.S. Route 29 in Alabama =

Segment of American highway

U.S. Route 29
- US 29 highlighted in red

Route information
- Maintained by ALDOT
- Length: 227.2 mi (365.6 km)
- Existed: 1926–present

Major junctions
- South end: US 29 near Century, FL
- US 31 from Flomaton to Brewton; US 84 in Andalusia; US 331 from Brantley to Luverne; US 231 in Troy; US 80 from Tuskegee to Alliance; I-85 from Auburn to Opelika; US 280 / US 431 in Opelika
- North end: US 29 in Lanett

Location
- Country: United States
- State: Alabama
- Counties: Escambia, Covington, Crenshaw, Pike, Bullock, Macon, Lee, Chambers

Highway system
- United States Numbered Highway System; List; Special; Divided; Alabama State Highway System; Interstate; US; State
← SR 28	→ SR 30
← SR 14	SR 15	→ SR 16

U.S. Route 29 (US 29), internally designated by the Alabama Department of Transportation (ALDOT) as State Route 15 (SR 15), is a southwest–northeast state highway across the southeastern part of the U.S. state of Alabama. US 29 and SR 15 traverse Alabama in a general northeast–southwest slope. It has never been a major route in the state; its significance was completely overshadowed with the completion of Interstate 65 (I-65) and I-85 during the 1970s. Today, US 29 and SR 15 serve primarily to connect numerous smaller towns and cities in the southwest, south-central, and eastern parts of Alabama.

US 29 has concurrencies with SR 113 from the Florida state line through Flomaton, SR 3 from Flomaton to Brewton, SR 41 from Brewton to East Brewton, SR 15 from East Brewton to the Georgia state line, SR 55 and then SR 12 in Andalusia, SR 9 from Brantley to Luverne, SR 10 from Luverne to Troy, SR 6 in Union Springs, SR 8 from Tuskegee to Alliance, and SR 38 in Opelika.

Concurrencies with U.S. Highways include US 31 from Flomaton to Brewton, US 84 in Andalusia, US 331 from Brantley to Luverne, US 82 in Union Springs, US 80 from Tuskegee to Alliance, and US 280 between exits 58 and 62 along I-85 in Opelika. US 29 also runs along I-85 between exit 51 in Auburn and exit 64 east of Opelika.

== Route description ==
=== Florida state line through East Brewton ===
US 29 enters downtown Flomaton in a concurrency with SR 113 from a bridge over a large railroad yard north of Century, Florida. Descending from that bridge over both the railroad yard and Ringgold Drive, the route is named Sidney E. Manning Boulevard and has its first intersection with Church Street. The road briefly runs straight north for one block between College and Poplar streets and then turns back to the northwest. Sidney E. Manning Boulevard ends at US 31, and US 29/SR 113 makes a right turn joining those routes in a concurrency, crossing a bridge over Big Escambia Creek. Throughout the multiplex with US 31, the road winds along the north side of the Alabama–Florida state line, occasionally making southeast turns.

SR 113 turns left and diverts from US 29, and US 31 heading toward its terminus at I-65, while US 29 and US 31 continue along hidden SR 3. For the rest of its journey, US 29, US 31, SR 3, and SR 15 wind mostly toward the northeast. A former section of US 31 branches off to the east where it enters Pollard, but US 29/US 31/SR 3 bypasses that community. The road intersects the former segment three times after this. The routes pass by a Georgia-Pacific paper mill just outside of the Brewton city limits. After the bridge over Burnt Corn Creek, a truck detour veers off to the left onto Persimmon Street because the main road flanks too closely to a former Louisville and Nashville Railroad line, entering the Brewton Historic Commercial District. The concurrency with US 31/SR 3 ends at SR 41 and US 29 and SR 41 instantly cross that line as they share a wrong-way concurrency. The road crosses the Buddy Mitchell Bridge over Murder Creek into East Brewton, and Mildred Street becomes Forest Avenue. The end of the concurrency with SR 41 is also the beginning of SR 15 where it remains almost throughout the rest of the state.

Just as it did with the overlap with US 31, US 29 winds around the north side of the Alabama–Florida state line. Briefly curving more toward the northeast, it serves as the terminuses of two county roads, County Route 22 (CR 22; Ridge Road) and CR 4 (Brantley Road), before curving back toward the east. East of CR 43, US 29/SR 15 crosses over a bridge over Conecuh River, enters the Conecuh National Forest where it passes through Dixie, and then crosses the Escambia–Covington county line. Along the way, it passes through the communities of Rome and then Pleasant Home and, after curving more toward the north and leaving the forest, serves as the northern terminus of SR 137. Continuing at that northeast trajectory, it passes through Carolina, which contains a Y intersection with CR 36 (Jacobs Road) and a short multiplex with CR 31 between a blinker-light intersection with Rockhole Bridge Road and Salem Church Road, which has no signals.

=== Andalusia through Luverne ===
The road officially enters Andalusia at the southern terminus of the concurrency with SR 55. US 29/SR 15/SR 55 becomes a four-lane undivided highway with center left-turn lane provisions. It passes the other end of Brooklyn Road (CR 42) then, off to the northeast, encounters the southern terminus of South Three Notch Road, which was once part of SR 15. SR 55 leaves the concurrency with US 29 at the west end of the concurrency with US 84/SR 12, and US 29/SR 15 joins that route in another concurrency. US 29/US 84/SR 12/SR 15 crosses a railroad line as it continues to curve toward the east until it runs southeast then straight east as it encounters Three North Road again. This intersection is the official end of the US 29/US 84 concurrency. US 29/SR 15 turns left onto Three Notch Road, while US 84/SR 12 crosses the same railroad line it encountered northeast of the beginning of the concurrency, and runs east through Opp, Elba, and Dothan and toward coastal Georgia.

North of Andalusia, the road curves toward the northwest as it approaches the western terminus of CR 40 (Antioch Road) and then straightens out towards the north as it runs through Heath, where another former segment of SR 15 and Three Notch Road now known as Straughn School Road branches off to the northeast. After the intersection with Barton Road, US 29/SR 15 curves to the northwest again replacing the trajectory of Barton Road itself. From there, a dirt road named CW Green Road branches off northwest of the road. The routes descend along a hill where the run under some power lines, then runs over a culvert before making another left curve and encountering the north end of CW Green Road, which this time is paved. Immediately after this intersection it encounters CR 82 (Haygood Road) and takes it along in a hidden concurrency as it curves to the west. The road crosses another bridge over the Conecuh River and enters Gantt, where it runs straight north, along the way serving as the northern terminus of CR 59 (Point A Road), letting go of another part of CR 82 at Gantt-Red Level Road, and serves as the southern terminus of CR 37 (Oakley-Streak Road). Curving to the northeast, the road passes through Dunns and then runs along the north shore of Gantt Lake eventually passing through Clearview. Maintaining relatively the same trajectory while the coastline of the lake moves away from the road, US 29/SR 15 enters Crenshaw County where it becomes Andalusia Highway and passes through Searight. The road makes a slight curve to the left, but still remains northeast as it passes through Dozier, where it has a blinker-light intersection with CR 77 and becomes Dozier Highway. Further north, it serves as the eastern terminus of SR 106. The road enters the town of Brantley just west of the intersection with Spring Hill Road and the name changes to West Emmett Avenue, which runs practically to the east until further downtown where it turns left onto an intersection with US 331 and unsigned SR 9 while East Emmett Avenue continues as a local city street. US 29, US 331, SR 9, and SR 15 are co-routed until they split at Luverne, specifically at SR 10 (Third Street). US 331 makes a left turn onto West Third Street, while US 29 makes a right turn onto East Third Street. From there, US 29 and SR 15 follow SR 10 east as the name changes from East Third Street to Troy Highway, then curves to the northeast into the Crenshaw–Pike county line north of CR 50 (Camp Ground Church Road). Once in Pike County, the road starts to curve to the east.

=== Troy area to Rural Macon County ===
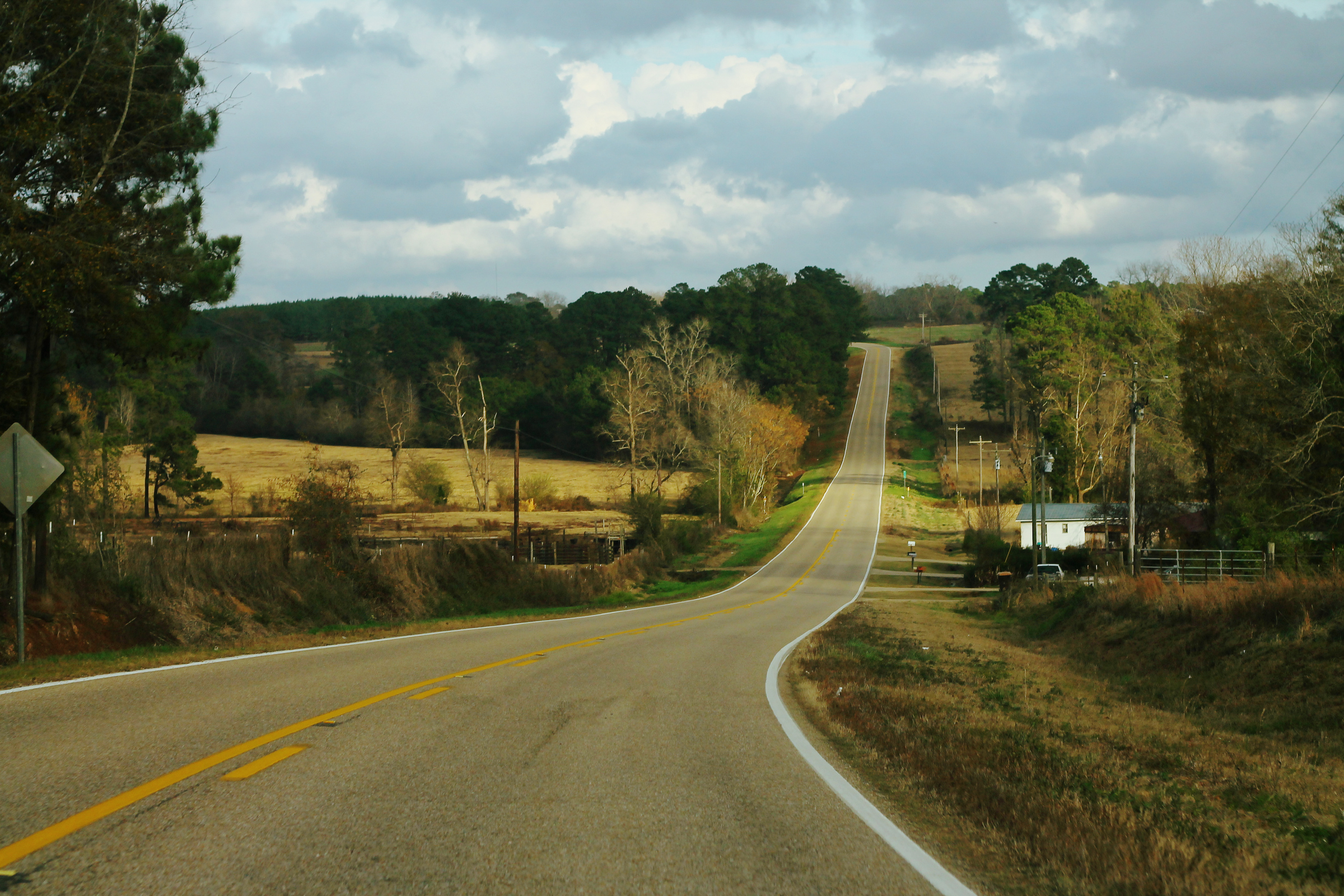
A view of US 29 north of Brundidge

After the intersection with CR 1174 (formerly CR 31), the road descends into a valley then climbs a hill that crests just before the intersection of CR 2205 (formerly CR 47). East of CR 2214 and then CR 1165 (formerly part of CR 25), the road crosses a third bridge over the Conecuh River. Approaching Troy, a railroad line begins to flank the north side of the road while CR 1101 runs along the north side of those tracks, as US 29/SR 10 gains the name Montgomery Street. SR 10 leaves the concurrency with US 29/SR 15 at a quarter-cloverleaf interchange with US 231 and unsigned SR 53. The ramps are on the southwest and southeast corners due to the railroad line flanking the north side of the road. Three Notch Road is encountered again, as US 29/SR 15 leaves Montgomery Street to turn left and go north, crossing the same railroad line it passed by over US 231, which itself curves toward the north. In the meantime, the route runs northeast until after the intersection of Love Street, where it turns straight north. The road runs along the west side of the town square between Church and Elm streets and later passes just outside of the College Street Historic District. After the intersection with Pierson Street, the road curve to the northeast.

Beginning near a cold-storage facility, the road runs along the west side of the same railroad line it had encountered in downtown Troy. After the intersection with CR 55, the road crosses a bridge over that line and then runs along the east side. Both the road and the railroad line curve from the northeast to the southeast, and, along the way, US 29/SR 15 serves as the southern terminus of SR 223. The road continues to curve to the southeast until it enters Banks, where it turns left onto a blinker-light intersection with Monticello Avenue crossing that same railroad line in the process, while SR 93 continues south from there. US 29/SR 15 runs mostly eastbound as it serves as the northern terminus of SR 201. After passing through some of the wetlands surrounding Richland Creek, it serves as the northern terminus of SR 130 north of Monticello, and then the route curves to the northeast. The last community in Pike County is Josie, where it then to north-northwest before the intersection with CR 6628. After curving to the right as it intersects CR 6652, it runs northeast as it crosses the Bullock County line and descends along a hill. After the county line it passes through communities such as Tanyard, where it intersects CR 53 before curving more toward the north as it runs along bridges over Mill and Double creeks, then Perote, where it intersects CR 8, then makes a reverse curve as it climbs a slight hill before running straight north. The road tilts north-northwest as it enters Blues Old Stand and then begins to curve towards the northeast where it passes through Scottland. Winding past a powerline right-of-way before making another curve toward the north, it passes through Aberfoil where it has a brief overlap with CR 31, but more importantly serves as the northern terminus of SR 239, with a connecting road south of that terminus. From there, US 29 curves to the northwest.

Approaching Union Springs as it crosses a fourth bridge over the Conecuh River, a US 29 Truck along with hidden SR 197 (Martin Luther King Boulevard South) branches off to the right then the road turns straight north onto South Prairie Street. Further north, it crosses a bridge over an abandoned railroad line between Underwood and Holcombe avenues. Later, South Prairie Street becomes North Prairie Street as US 29/SR 15 makes a right turn onto a concurrency with US 82 and unsigned SR 6 (Blackmon Avenue) for two blocks. The concurrency does not end as US 29/US 82/SR 6/SR 15 makes a left turn onto Martin Luther King Boulevard North, terminating US 29 Truck. Two blocks after that, US 82/SR 6 makes a right turn onto Conecuh Avenue East, terminating the concurrency, and US 29/SR 15 continues north. On its way out of the city limits, US 29 widens from three lanes to four as it curves to the northwest, then narrows back down to three lanes as it curves to the northeast before finally leaving the city just south of CR 23, then runs over a culvert over Old Towne Creek. In Sedgefield, US 29 curves to the north-northwest and serves as the southwest end of CR 115. The road runs relatively in the same direction even as it passes through the Moores Creek wetlands, before the northeast end of CR 115, then crosses a bridge over Dobbs Creek just south of the Bullock–Macon county line. Shortly afterward, it runs through Fort Davis which has a one block concurrency with CR 2, due to a culvert over a tributary of Dobbs Creek. It then passes by the abandoned Seaboard Air Line Railroad line and station just before the post office. At the intersection of Saint Mark's Road, it makes a curve to the northeast and further north passes through communities such as Cotton Valley and later Davisville where it has another concurrency, this time with CR 47.

=== Tuskegee to the Georgia state line ===
In Tuskegee, US 29 becomes Union Springs Road in front of the George Washington Carver Elementary School and makes a sharp curve to the west-northwest as it approaches CR 10, where it turns into South Main Street. Before reaching downtown Tuskegee, US 29 makes a slight right curve but still remains northwest. Running through historic downtown Tuskegee, it makes a right turn in front of the town green to join eastbound US 80 and unsigned SR 8 in downtown Tuskegee. SR 81, begins on the east side of the town green, before moving to North Main Street, while SR 81 Truck also begins and runs along the concurrency with US 29 and US 80. US 29, US 80, SR 8, SR 15, and SR 81 Truck are co-routed along East Martin Luther King Junior Drive until the intersection with General Chappie James Drive, where truck route 81 turns north. Later the routes enter the Tuskegee National Forest. They briefly leave the forest but then reenter it together until they split at an interchange southwest of Alliance, which is also the eastern terminus of SR 186. This interchange has a single eastbound ramp on the southeast corner, and a bidirectional quarter-cloverleaf ramp on the northwest corner. After leaving the forest for the last time and then intersecting a dirt road named Lee Road 191, the route takes a brief dip and then crosses the Macon–Lee county line.

Southwest of Auburn, US 29 becomes South College Road, encounters an industrial park at Cox Road and Sand Hill Road (CR 10) and then has an interchange with I-85 at exit 51. US 29/SR 15 joins I-85 in a concurrency, while South College Road becomes SR 147. The freeway segment continues northeast into the city of Opelika, the county seat of Lee County. At exit 58, I-85/US 29 gains a second U.S. Highway concurrency at exit 58, its four-ramp partial cloverleaf interchange with Gateway Drive, where US 280 (and unsigned SR 38) joins from the northwest. The three highways cross over a Norfolk Southern Railway line just west of their four-ramp partial cloverleaf interchange with SR 51 and SR 169 south of downtown Opelika. US 280/SR 38 splits east toward Phenix City and Columbus at the next interchange with US 431 and unsigned SR 1, which is exit 62. At exit 64, US 29 leaves I-85 and joins West Point Parkway, but the road runs in close proximity to I-85 from the Auburn area to near Winston-Salem, North Carolina.

Though independent of I-85, US 29 has intersections with some relatively important roads leading to it, first among them Andrews Road (unmarked CR 799) which leads I‑85 at exit 66 as well as a Walmart distribution center, then crosses CR 177. The road briefly turns east then curves toward the northeast. At the terminus of CR 390, it turns north-northeast and runs under a powerline right-of-way. CR 266 branches off to the northwest, while US 29 branches off to the northeast, then the road intersects CR 270. From there, the road curves north-northeast, then crosses an abandoned railroad line between the intersections of CR 268 and CR 271, and later runs through a wooded area where it crosses the Lee–Chambers county line where West Point Parkway becomes the Millard Fuller Memorial Highway. North of this border, it starts to make a slight curve to the northeast, where it encounters a 354-foot (108 m) multiplex with CR 388, the western end of which leads to I-85 at exit 70.

The road officially enters the city of Valley approximately 0.3-mile (0.48 km) southwest of the intersection with Ben Brown Road. After the intersection with Judge Brown Road, the road gradually widens from two to four lanes as it crosses the Duwayne Bridges Bridge and then, after the intersection with Fairfax Bypass, becomes a divided highway. From there, the road winds through the former community of Fairfax. The road cuts through a portion of the historic district named for that community. After leaving that district at the intersection with Cusseta and River roads, the divider ends at a street named "Boulevard" but the road remains four-lanes wide as it begins to flank the Chattahoochee Valley Railroad Trail. It also gains a continuous center left-turn lane, which it possesses almost throughout the rest of the state.

In the former community of Langdale, the road winds down a slight hill then curves from 64th Boulevard to 20th Street, as the trail moves away from the road again in order to run along the Horace King Memorial Covered Bridge. The route, trail, and bridge are part of the Langdale Historic District and so are the former Landgale Cotton Mill, the Sears Memorial Auditorium, and various schools. Between 21st Avenue and 59th Street, US 29 crosses a bridge over Moores Creek then intersects CR 209 (Fob James Road), where it also has a crossing with the same rail trail. Fob James Road leads to exit 77 on I-85. Roughly near Lanier Health Services, the route enters the former community Eady City and stays there until the intersection of 40th Street, but the route still remains in Valley, although around 33rd Street it enters the former community known as Shawmut, where it runs along the eastern edge of the Shawmut Historic District. The northern border of that district ends at 29th Boulevard, which is 43 feet (13 m) north of 23rd Drive, the gateway to Shawmut. Just north of 28th Street, the divided highway briefly returns within the vicinity of I-85 at exit 79, the last exit for I-85 within the state.

In Lanett, the road runs over a bridge over a former Western Railway of Alabama (WRA) line and then serves as the eastern terminus of SR 50, the last state highway to intersect with US 29. At that intersection, the road curves straight to the northeast and becomes Glimer Avenue. A residential frontage road runs along the east side between South 14th and South 10th streets. At the intersection of First Street, the numerical order of the side streets reverts forward. North of there, the same WRA line the road crossed over before the intersection with SR 50 begins to flank the east side of the road. The last intersection in Alabama is with North Seventh Avenue, a local street completely dominated by a car and truck dealership. US 29 enters the state of Georgia which runs northwest to southeast and the city of West Point, thus bringing SR 15 to an end.

== History ==
The original southern terminus of US 29 was in Tuskegee and ran along today's SR 81 and SR 14. It was extended south into Brewton by 1934. Within Flomaton, US 29 was originally a segment of US 331 between 1926 and 1936. US 29 was extended to the road in 1935.

Three Notch Road is a local street that was the name of former segments of SR 15.

US 29 once passed through downtown Auburn and downtown Opelika. The U.S. Highway has been concurrent with I-85 from exit 51, south of Auburn, to exit 64, northeast of Opelika. This change was made by ALDOT in the 1990s. Route markers have been appropriately relocated since then, though some maps still show the old route in this area as being part of SR 15.

== Major intersections ==
County	Location	mi	km	Exit	Destinations	Notes
Escambia	Flomaton	0.0	0.0		US 29 south (SR 95) – Pensacola	Continuation from Florida
Escambia	Flomaton	0.8	1.3		US 31 south / SR 3 south – Atmore, Turtle Point Environmental Science Center	Southern end of US 31 / SR 3 overlap; Mileposts switch from SR 113 to SR 3
Escambia	Flomaton	1.9	3.1		SR 113 north – Barnett Crossroads	Northern end of SR 113 overlap
Escambia	Brewton	14.7	23.7		US 31 north (St. Joseph Avenue) / SR 3 north (St. Nicholas Ave./Mildred St.) / SR 41 – Evergreen, Conecuh County, Repton	Northern end of US 31 / SR 3 overlap; Northern end of SR 41 overlap; Southern end of SR 15 overlap; southern terminus of SR 15; mileposts switch from SR 3 to SR 15
Escambia	Brewton–East Brewton line	15.0	24.1	Buddy Mitchell Bridge over the Murder Creek		
Escambia	East Brewton	15.5	24.9		CR 22 (Shoffer Street)	
Escambia	East Brewton	16.0	25.7		SR 41 south (Florida Street) – Milton	Southern end of SR 41 overlap
Escambia		24.8	39.9		CR 22 west (Ridge Road) / CR 4 east (Brantley Road) – East Brewton, Wing	
Escambia		34.3	55.2		CR 43 (Brooklyn Road) – Brooklyn	
Escambia		34.5	55.5	Conecuh River		
Covington		48.6	78.2		SR 137 south – Wing	Northern terminus of SR 137
Covington	Andalusia	57.2	92.1		SR 55 south (SR-15 north) / SR 15 north – Florala, Destin	Southern end of SR 55 overlap; southern end of SR 15 overlap
Covington	Andalusia	58.4	94.0		Three Notch Street – Downtown Andalusia	Former SR 15 north
Covington	Andalusia	60.0	96.6		US 84 west / SR 55 north (SR 12) to I-65 – River Falls, McKenzie	Southern end of US 84/SR 12 overlap; northern end of SR 55 overlap; mileposts switch from SR 55 to SR 12
Covington	Andalusia	62.2	100.1		US 84 east (SR 12) – Opp	Northern end of US 84/SR 12 overlap; South Three Notch Street returns; south end of SR 15 overlap
Covington	Heath	65.1	104.8		CR 43 east (Straughn School Road) – Straughn	Former SR 15 north/Three Notch Street
Covington		68.0	109.4		CR 82 east (Haygood Road)	
Covington		68.3	109.9	Conecuh River		
Covington	Gantt	68.5	110.2		CR 59 west (Point A Road)	
Covington	Gantt	69.1	111.2		CR 82 west (Gantt Red Level Road)	
Covington	Gantt	69.4	111.7		CR 37 (Oakey Streak Road)	
Crenshaw	Dozier	78.8	126.8		CR 77 (Leon Tower Road/Main Street)	
Crenshaw		85.2	137.1		SR 106 west (Georgiana Highway) – Georgiana	Eastern terminus of SR 106
Crenshaw	Brantley	88.0	141.6		US 331 south (SR 9) – Elba, Opp	Southern end of US 331/SR 9 overlap; mileposts switch from SR 15 to SR 9
Crenshaw	Luverne	97.5	156.9		US 331 north / SR 10 west (SR 9) – Montgomery, Greenville	Northern end of US 331/SR 9 overlap; west end of SR 10 overlap; mileposts switch from SR 9 to SR 10
Pike		114.0	183.5	Conecuh River		
Pike	Troy	117.6	189.3		US 231 / SR 10 east (SR 53) – Brundidge, Ozark	Interchange; northern end of SR 10 overlap; mileposts switch from SR 10 to SR 15
Pike	Troy	118.5	190.7		CR 21 south (South 3 Notch Street)	
Pike		126.7	203.9		SR 223 north – Union Springs	Southern terminus of SR 223
Pike	Banks	128.7	207.1		SR 93 south	Northern terminus of SR 93
Pike		129.3	208.1		CR 60 north	
Pike		129.8	208.9		SR 201 south	Northern terminus of SR 201
Pike		130.7	210.3	Richland Creek		
Pike	Monticello	132.6	213.4		SR 130 east	Western terminus of SR 130
Bullock	Aberfoil	153.6	247.2		SR 239 south	Northern terminus of SR 239
Bullock		155.6	250.4	Conecuh River		
Bullock	Union Springs	157.8	254.0		US 29 Truck north (SR 197 / Martin Luther King Boulevard)	Southern end of US 29 Truck Route
Bullock	Union Springs	158.8	255.6		US 82 west (SR 6 / Blackmon Street)	Southern end of US 82 / SR 6 overlap
Bullock	Union Springs	159.0	255.9		US 29 Truck north (SR 197 / Martin Luther King Boulevard)	Northern end of US 29 Truck Route; Northern terminus of SR 197; US 29/82 turns left onto Martin Luther King Boulevard
Bullock	Union Springs	159.2	256.2		US 82 east (SR 6 / Conecuh Avenue) – Eufaula	Northern end of US 82 / SR 6 overlap
Macon	Fort Davis	166.0	267.2		CR 2 east	Southern end of CR-2 overlap
Macon	Fort Davis	166.1	267.3		CR 2 west	Northern end of CR-2 overlap
Macon	Tuskegee	178.6	287.4		CR 10 south (Old Columbus Road)	
Macon	Tuskegee	180.2	290.0		US 80 west (SR 8) / SR 81 north (North Main Street) / SR 81 Truck begins to I-85	Southern end of US 80 / SR 8 overlap; southern end of SR 81; southern end of Truck Route 81 overlap; mileposts switch from SR 15 to SR 8
Macon	Tuskegee	182.0	292.9		SR 81 Truck north (General Chappie James Drive) – Morton Field	Northern end of SR 81 Truck overlap
Macon	Alliance	187.6	301.9		US 80 east (SR 8) / SR 186 west to I-85 – Phenix City, Columbus	Interchange; Northern end of US 80 / SR 8 overlap; east end of SR 186
Lee	Auburn	194.1	312.4		Auburn Technology Parkway	
Lee	Auburn	195.3	314.3	51	I-85 south (SR 15 south) / SR 147 (College Street) – Auburn	Southern end of I-85 overlap; Mileposts switch from SR 15 to I 85
Lee	Auburn	200.7	323.0	57	Bent Creek Road	
Lee	Opelika	202.4	325.7	58	US 280 west (SR 38 west / Gateway Drive)	Southern end of US 280 / SR 38 overlap
Lee	Opelika	204.4	328.9	60	SR 51 / SR 169 – Opelika, Hurtsboro	
Lee	Opelika	205.8	331.2	62	US 280 east (SR 38 east) / US 431 (SR 1) – Opelika, Phenix City	Northern end of US 280 / SR 38 overlap
Lee	Opelika	208.2	335.1	64	I-85 north (SR 15 north) – Opelika	Northern end of I-85 overlap; Mileposts switch from I 85 to SR 15
Lee		214.8	345.7		CR 270 – Cusseta, Beulah	
Chambers	Valley	217.9	350.7		CR 388 – Cusseta	354 foot overlap
Chambers	Langdale	222.8	358.6	Moores Creek		
Chambers	Langdale	223.0	358.9		CR 208 (Fob James Road) – Huguley	
Chambers	Shawmut	225.3	362.6		I-85 – Atlanta, Montgomery	Exit 79 on I-85
Chambers	Lanett	225.9	363.6		SR 50 west (Veterans Memorial Highway) – Lafayette	Eastern terminus of SR-50
Chambers	West Point	227.2	365.6		US 29 north / SR 14 north - John C. Barrow Bridge	Continuation into Georgia
1.000 mi = 1.609 km; 1.000 km = 0.621 mi: Concurrency terminus; Incomplete access

U.S. Route 29
Previous state: Florida	Alabama	Next state: Georgia
