= Alabama State Route 130 =

Alabama's highway

State Route 130

Route information
- Maintained by ALDOT
- Length: 15.507 mi (24.956 km)

Major junctions
- West end: US 29 near Banks
- East end: SR 51 in Louisville

Location
- Country: United States
- State: Alabama
- Counties: Pike, Barbour

Highway system
- Alabama State Highway System; Interstate; US; State
← SR 129	→ SR 131

State Route 130 (SR 130) is a 15.5-mile-long (24.9 km) state highway in Pike and Barbour counties in the southeastern part of the U.S. state of Alabama. The western terminus of the highway is at an intersection with U.S. Route 29 (US 29) east of Banks. The eastern terminus of the highway is at an intersection with SR 51 in Louisville.

== Route description ==
SR 130 begins at an intersection with US 29 (internally designated as SR 15) east of Banks. It travels southeast, south, and then east towards Louisville. The highway then ends at SR 51 in Louisville.

== Major intersections ==
County	Location	mi	km	Destinations	Notes
Pike		0.000	0.000	US 29 (SR 15) – Banks, Troy, Union Springs	Western terminus
Barbour	Louisville	15.507	24.956	SR 51 – Clio, Clayton	Eastern terminus
1.000 mi = 1.609 km; 1.000 km = 0.621 mi
