= Alabama State Route 223 =

State highway in Alabama, United States

State Route 223

Route information
- Maintained by ALDOT
- Length: 26.452 mi (42.570 km)

Major junctions
- South end: US 29 near Banks
- North end: US 82 in Union Springs

Location
- Country: United States
- State: Alabama
- Counties: Bullock, Pike

Highway system
- Alabama State Highway System; Interstate; US; State
← I-222	→ SR 225

State Route 223 (SR 223) is a 26-mile-long (42 km) route that serves as a connection between Union Springs in Bullock County with Banks in Pike County .

== Route description ==
The southern terminus of SR 223 is located at its intersection with US 29 to the northwest of Banks. From this point, the route generally travels in a northward to northeast direction before terminating at US 82 in Union Springs.

== Major intersections ==
County	Location	mi	km	Destinations	Notes
Pike		0.000	0.000	US 29 (SR 15) – Banks, Troy	Southern terminus
Bullock	Union Springs	26.452	42.570	US 82 (Baskin Street/SR 6) – Montgomery, Downtown, Midway	Northern terminus
1.000 mi = 1.609 km; 1.000 km = 0.621 mi
