= Alabama State Route 197 =

Highway in Alabama

State Route 197
- Martin Luther King Boulevard

Route information
- Maintained by ALDOT
- Length: 1.023 mi (1.646 km)

Major junctions
- South end: US 29 in Union Springs
- North end: US 29 / US 82 in Union Springs

Location
- Country: United States
- State: Alabama
- Counties: Bullock

Highway system
- Alabama State Highway System; Interstate; US; State
← SR 196	→ SR 198

State Route 197 (SR 197) is a 1.023-mile-long (1.646 km) state highway that travels completely within the north-central part of Bullock County in the U.S. state of Alabama. It serves as an alternate route between U.S. Route 29 (US 29) and US 82 through Union Springs. SR 197 is also signed as U.S. Route 29 Truck (US 29 Truck) and Martin Luther King Boulevard.

== Route description ==
SR 197 begins at an intersection with US 29 (South Prairie Street) in the south-central part of Union Springs. The route travels to the north-northeast on Martin Luther King Boulevard South. After passing L Avenue, it curves to a nearly due-north orientation and continues this direction until it meets its northern terminus, an intersection with US 29/US 82 in the central part of Union Springs.

SR 197 is not part of the National Highway System, a system of roadways important to the nation's economy, defense, and mobility.

== Major intersections ==
The entire route is in Union Springs, Bullock County.

mi	km	Destinations	Notes
0.0	0.0	US 29 (South Prairie Street/SR 15) – Banks, Troy	Southern terminus
1.023	1.646	US 29 / US 82 (Blackmon Street/Martin Luther King Boulevard/SR 15/SR 6) – Montgomery, Tuskegee, Midway	Northern terminus
1.000 mi = 1.609 km; 1.000 km = 0.621 mi
