= Alabama State Route 81 =

State highway in Alabama, United States

State Route 81

Route information
- Maintained by ALDOT
- Length: 10.432 mi (16.789 km)

Major junctions
- South end: US 29 / US 80 / SR 81 Truck in Tuskegee
- I-85 near Tuskegee
- North end: SR 14 in Notasulga

Location
- Country: United States
- State: Alabama
- Counties: Macon

Highway system
- Alabama State Highway System; Interstate; US; State
← US 80	→ US 82

State Route 81 (SR 81) is a 10.432-mile-long (16.789 km) state highway in the central part of the U.S. state of Alabama. The southern terminus of the highway is at an intersection with US 29/US 80/SR 81 Truck in Tuskegee. The northern terminus of the highway is at an intersection with SR 14 in Notasulga.

== Route description ==
SR 81 is a two-lane road for its entire length. In addition to connecting Tuskegee and Notasulga, it serves as a route for motorists traveling on Interstate 85 (I-85) to access the two towns. Traffic on SR 81 increases significantly when the Auburn Tigers football team is playing at Jordan–Hare Stadium. Motorists traveling from the west along I-85 can exit onto SR 81 and follow it to eastbound SR 14, which leads to Auburn.

In September 2004, a segment of SR 83 near the Tuskegee Airmen National Historic Site was dedicated Tuskegee Airmen Boulevard by the National Park Service.

A project to replace the SR 81 bridge over Uphappee Creek north of Tuskegee began in November 2022. The new bridge is expected to be completed in summer 2024.

== Major intersections ==
The entire route is in Macon County.

Location	mi	km	Destinations	Notes
Tuskegee	0.000	0.000	US 80 / SR 81 Truck north (West Martin Luther King Highway / SR 8) to US 29	Southern terminus of SR 81 and SR 81 Truck
Tuskegee	2.9	4.7	SR 81 Truck south – Tuskegee Airmen National Historic Site	Northern terminus of SR 81 Truck
Tuskegee	3.121	5.023	SR 199 north	Southern terminus of SR 199
	3.761	6.053	I-85 – Montgomery, Atlanta	I-85 exit 38
Notasulga	10.432	16.789	SR 14 – Tallassee, Auburn	Northern terminus
1.000 mi = 1.609 km; 1.000 km = 0.621 mi

== Tuskegee Truck route ==
State Route 81 Truck
- Location: Tuskegee
- Existed: yes

State Route 81 Truck (SR 81 Truck) was a truck route of SR 81 in Tuskegee that travelled from US 29/US 80 (SR 8/SR 15) to SR 81. The truck route travelled along US 29/US 80 (East Martin Luther King Highway) from the Tuskegee Town Green to General Chappie James Drive, then turned northwest along General Chappie James Drive. North of Northeast Brothers Drive in the North Marable Subdivision, General Chappie James Drive becomes General Chappie James Avenue. After a National Guard post, it passed by the Tuskegee Airmen National Historic Site, then the entrance to Moton Field Municipal Airport before finally ending at SR 81.
