= Alabama State Route 186 =

State highway in Alabama, United States

State Route 186

Route information
- Maintained by ALDOT
- Length: 3.829 mi (6.162 km)
- Existed: 1974–present

Major junctions
- West end: I-85 west of Auburn
- East end: US 29 / US 80 east of Tuskegee

Location
- Country: United States
- State: Alabama
- Counties: Macon

Highway system
- Alabama State Highway System; Interstate; US; State
← SR 185	→ SR 187

State Route 186 (SR 186) is a 3.829-mile (6.162 km) state highway in Macon County. The western terminus of the route is at an interchange with Interstate 85 (I-85) approximately 9 miles (14 km) west of Auburn. The eastern terminus of the route is at its junction with US 29/US 80 approximately 8 miles (13 km) east of Tuskegee.

== Route description ==
From its origination, State Route 186 passes through the Tuskegee National Forest. The two-lane route serves as a connector route between I-85 and Phenix City and Columbus, Georgia via U.S. Highway 80.

== Major intersections ==
The entire route is in Macon County.

Location	mi	km	Destinations	Notes
	0.0	0.0	I-85 – Montgomery, Atlanta	Western terminus; I-85 exit 42
	3.829	6.162	US 29 (SR 15) / US 80 (SR 8) – Tuskegee, Auburn, Phenix City	Eastern terminus; interchange
1.000 mi = 1.609 km; 1.000 km = 0.621 mi
