= U.S. Route 82 in Alabama =

Highway in Alabama

U.S. Route 82
- State Route 6 (SR 6)
- US 82 highlighted in red

Route information
- Maintained by ALDOT
- Length: 240.080 mi (386.371 km)
- Existed: 1934–present

Major junctions
- West end: US 82 near Columbus, MS
- US 43 in Northport; I-20 / I-59 in Tuscaloosa; US 11 in Tuscaloosa; US 31 in Prattville; I-65 in Prattville; Future I-685 / I-85 in Montgomery; US 80 / SR 21 in Montgomery; US 331 in Montgomery; US 29 in Union Springs; US 431 in Eufaula
- East end: US 82 / SR 50 at Georgetown, GA

Location
- Country: United States
- State: Alabama
- Counties: Pickens, Tuscaloosa, Bibb, Chilton, Autauga, Montgomery, Bullock, Barbour

Highway system
- United States Numbered Highway System; List; Special; Divided; Alabama State Highway System; Interstate; US; State
← SR 81	→ SR 83
← SR 5	SR 6	→ SR 7

U.S. Route 82 in Alabama runs northwest to southeast across the northwestern and central Alabama for 240.080 miles (386.371 km). The route enters from Mississippi east of Columbus, Mississippi and exits into Georgia across the Chattahoochee River at Eufaula.

== Route description ==
Throughout Alabama, US 82 is paired with unsigned State Route 6 (SR 6). The highway enters the state east of Columbus, Mississippi, and bears southeast towards Northport and Tuscaloosa, where it crosses over I-20 and I-59 south of town. It is known in West Alabama as McFarland Boulevard, in memory of Ward Wharton McFarland, a political, business, and civic leader who died in 1979. After leaving Tuscaloosa, the route continues southeast, passing through the cities of Brent, Centreville, and Maplesville en route to Prattville, on the northern edge of the Montgomery metropolitan area. This approximately 92-mile (148 km) drive goes through some of the most rural areas of the state, much of it two lanes with the exception of the section from Tuscaloosa to Centreville. Upon arriving in Prattville, it runs concurrently with I-65, with which it goes through downtown Montgomery with (also junctioning with the current southern terminus of I-85), and splits off to the east south of downtown. After leaving Montgomery, the route continues southeast through Union Springs and Midway en route to Eufaula, on the Alabama–Georgia state line, where it junctions with US 431. The route then crosses over the Chattahoochee River into Georgetown, Georgia, over Lake Eufaula.

== History ==
U.S. Route 82 was first designated within the state of Alabama in June of 1934. At the time, it ran from the Mississippi border to U.S. Route 11 in Tuscaloosa. In the summer of 1948, US 82 was extended across the state along its current route and into Georgia. The westbound lanes of the Gordo bypass opened on July 28, 2026, resulting in the previous alignment through Gordo being renumbered as SR 482. The eastbound lanes should be completed by the middle of 2027.

== Major intersections ==
County	Location	mi	km	Destinations	Notes
Pickens		0.000	0.000	US 82 west	Continuation into Mississippi
Pickens	Reform	17.642	28.392	SR 17 south (Fourth Street SW) / Fourth Street NW – Carrollton	West end of SR 17 overlap
Pickens	Reform	17.784	28.621	SR 17 north (First Street North) / First Street South – Millport	East end of SR 17 overlap
Pickens	Gordo	25.845	41.593	SR 159 north (South Main Street) – Fayette	Southern terminus of SR 159
Pickens		27.358	44.028	SR 86 west – Carrollton, Aliceville	Eastern terminus of SR 86
Tuscaloosa	Northport	42.6	68.6	To I-20 / I-59 / Boone Boulevard / Rose Boulevard	Toll bridge on Boone Boulevard south to I-20 / 59
Tuscaloosa	Northport	45.438	73.125	US 43 north (SR 13 north) / Main Avenue – Fayette	West end of US 43 / SR 13 overlap
Tuscaloosa	Northport	46.392	74.661	US 43 south / SR 69 (SR 13 south / Lurleen B. Wallace Boulevard) to I-20 / I-59 / I-359 – Tuscaloosa, Jasper	East end of US 43 / SR 13 overlap
Tuscaloosa	Tuscaloosa	49.3– 49.5	79.3– 79.7	Woolsey Finnell Bridge over Black Warrior River	
Tuscaloosa	Tuscaloosa	49.5– 49.7	79.7– 80.0	Jack Warner Parkway	Interchange
Tuscaloosa	Tuscaloosa	50.2	80.8	Campus Drive	Interchange
Tuscaloosa	Tuscaloosa	50.5– 50.6	81.3– 81.4	University Boulevard	Interchange; access to the University of Alabama
Tuscaloosa	Tuscaloosa	51.373	82.677	SR 215 (Veterans Memorial Parkway)	
Tuscaloosa	Tuscaloosa	53.168	85.566	I-20 / I-59 – Meridian, Birmingham	I-20 / 59 exit 73
Tuscaloosa	Tuscaloosa	53.420	85.971	US 11 (SR 7 / Skyland Boulevard East)	
Tuscaloosa	Tuscaloosa	54.823	88.229	SR 215 north (Old Montgomery Highway)	Southern terminus of SR 215
Bibb	Centreville	81.547	131.237	SR 5 – Brent, West Blocton	Interchange
Bibb	Centreville	82.827	133.297	SR 219 north (Birmingham Road) / Birmingham Road	West end of SR 219 overlap
Bibb	Centreville	83.1	133.7	Walter Owens Bridge over Cahaba River	
Bibb	Centreville	83.521	134.414	SR 25 / SR 219 south – Centreville	Interchange
Bibb		87.803	141.305	SR 382 west (Montgomery Highway) / CR 20 east (Anitoch Road) – Antioch, Randolph	Eastern terminus of SR 382
Chilton		101.044	162.615	SR 183 south – Marion	Northern terminus of SR 183
Chilton	Maplesville	105.624	169.985	To SR 22 – Maplesville, Selma	
Autauga	Prattville	140.036	225.366	SR 14 west (Selma Highway) / Selma Highway	West end of SR 14 overlap
Autauga	Prattville	142.852	229.898	US 31 (SR 3 / South Memorial Drive) – Montgomery, Birmingham	
Elmore	Prattville	145.926	234.845	I-65 north / SR 14 east / Cobbs Ferry Road to Montgomery Toll Road	East end of SR 14 overlap; west end of I-65 overlap; I-65 exit 179
Elmore–Montgomery county line	Montgomery	145.926– 153.189	234.845– 246.534	see I-65 (mile 178.961–168.213)	
Montgomery	Montgomery	153.189	246.534	I-65 south / US 80 west (SR 8 west) / West South Boulevard (SR 21 south) to US 31 – Selma, Mobile	East end of I-65 overlap; west end of US 80 / SR 8 / SR 21 overlap; I-65 exit 168
Montgomery	Montgomery	154.771	249.080	US 331 south (SR 9 south) / South Court Street (South Court Street) – Luverne	Northern terminus of US 331; west end of SR 9 overlap
Montgomery	Montgomery	158.668	255.351	US 80 east / US 231 north / SR 21 north (SR 8 east / SR 9 north / SR 53 north / Eastern Boulevard) to I-85 / McGehee Road	East end of US 80 / SR 8 / 9 / 21; west end of US 231 / SR 53 overlap; To I-85 signed westbound only
Montgomery	Montgomery	162.088	260.855	SR 271 north (Taylor Road) to I-85	Southern terminus of SR 271
Montgomery		171.098	275.356	US 231 south (SR 53 south / Troy Highway) – Troy, Dothan	East end of US 231 / SR 53 overlap
Bullock		195.624	314.826	SR 110 west	Eastern terminus of SR 110
Bullock	Union Springs	198.094	318.801	SR 223 south (Baskin Street) / Montgomery Avenue	Northern terminus of SR 223
Bullock	Union Springs	198.551	319.537	US 29 south (SR 15 south / South Prairie Street) / North Prairie Street – Banks	West end of US 29 / SR 15 overlap
Bullock	Union Springs	198.708	319.790	US 29 Truck south (SR 197 south / Martin Luther King Boulevard) / Blackmon Avenue	Northern terminus of US 29 Truck / SR 197
Bullock	Union Springs	198.904	320.105	US 29 north (SR 15 north / Martin Luther King Boulevard) / Conecuh Avenue – Auburn, Tuskegee	East end of US 29 / SR 15 overlap
Bullock		205.712	331.061	SR 51 north – Hurtsboro	West end of SR 51 overlap
Bullock	Midway	212.371	341.778	SR 51 south / CR 47 north (Enon Road) – Clayton	East end of SR 51 overlap
Barbour	Eufaula	237.764	382.644	US 431 north (SR 1 north / North Eufaula Avenue) – Phenix City	West end of US 431 / SR 1 overlap
Barbour	Eufaula	239.248	385.032	US 431 south (SR 1 south / South Eufaula Avenue) / West Barbour Street	East end of US 431 / SR 1 overlap
Barbour	Eufaula-Georgetown GA city line	239.895	386.074	Ernest Vandiver Causeway over Lake Eufaula / Chattahoochee River	
Barbour	Eufaula-Georgetown GA city line	240.080	386.371	US 82 east / SR 50 east	Continuation into Georgia
1.000 mi = 1.609 km; 1.000 km = 0.621 mi: Concurrency terminus

U.S. Route 82
Previous state: Mississippi	Georgia	Next state: Georgia
