= Alabama State Route 113 =

State highway in Alabama, United States

State Route 113

Route information
- Maintained by ALDOT
- Length: 15.457 mi (24.876 km)
- Existed: 1979–present

Major junctions
- South end: US 29 at the Florida state line in Flomaton
- US 29 / US 31 in Flomaton
- North end: I-65 near Barnett Crossroads

Location
- Country: United States
- State: Alabama
- Counties: Escambia

Highway system
- Alabama State Highway System; Interstate; US; State
| ← SR 111 | → SR 114 |

State Route 113 (SR 113) is a 15.457-mile-long (24.876 km) state highway in Escambia County in the southern part of the U.S. state of Alabama. The southern terminus of the highway is at the Florida state line, where U.S. Route 29 (US 29) enters Flomaton, Alabama from Century, Florida. The northern terminus of the highway is at an interchange with Interstate 65 (I-65) near Barnett Crossroads in the north-central part of the county.

== Route description ==
The first reassurance marker for SR 113 appears along US 29 just north of the Florida state line. Approximately 1 mile (1.6 km) north of the state line, US 29 and SR 113 begin a concurrency with US 31 as they travel to the northeast out of Flomaton. East of Flomaton, SR 113 diverts from US 29/US 31 and leads motorists towards its terminus at its interchange with I-65 at exit 69.

SR 113 is one of several highways that connect with US 29, which heads to Pensacola, Florida and the beaches along the Florida Panhandle on the Gulf of Mexico.

== Future ==
SR 113 is a major evacuation route for residents of the Pensacola metropolitan area seeking to flee incoming hurricanes. As such, Alabama is currently planning to widen the highway to a four-lane divided highway status from Flomaton to I-65. Though the road is in Alabama, neighboring Escambia County, Florida has agreed to contribute $4 million to the project due to the benefits the widened road will provide to its citizens.

On November 12, 2008, Gov. Bob Riley and Alabama Transportation Director Joe McInnes cut the ribbon opening up the new 13.5-mile (21.7 km), four-lane highway. The project opened a month ahead of schedule.

Not only does the new project make it safer and more efficient for evacuations from hurricanes, officials hope that the improved roadway will help bolster economic development opportunities for the coastal region.

== Major intersections ==
The entire route is in Escambia County.

| Location | mi | km | Destinations | Notes |
|---|---|---|---|---|
| Flomaton | 0.000 | 0.000 | US 29 south (SR 95) – Pensacola | Florida state line; southern end of US 29 concurrency |
| Flomaton | 0.807 | 1.299 | US 31 south (SR 3) – Atmore, Turtle Point Environmental Science Center | South end of US 31/SR 3 concurrency |
| Flomaton | 1.947 | 3.133 | US 29 north / US 31 north (SR 3) – Brewton | North end of US 29 and US 31/SR 3 concurrencies |
| | 15.457 | 24.876 | I-65 / CR 17 (Barnett Highway) – Mobile, Montgomery | I-65 exit 69 |
1.000 mi = 1.609 km; 1.000 km = 0.621 mi: Concurrency terminus
