= Alabama State Route 225 =

State highway in Alabama, United States

State Route 225

Route information
- Maintained by ALDOT
- Length: 23.910 mi (38.479 km)

Major junctions
- South end: US 31 at Spanish Fort
- I-65 near Stockton
- North end: SR 59 at Stockton

Location
- Country: United States
- State: Alabama
- Counties: Baldwin

Highway system
- Alabama State Highway System; Interstate; US; State
| ← SR 223 | → SR 227 |

State Route 225 (SR 225) is a 24-mile-long (39 km) route that serves as a connection between Stockton and Spanish Fort in western Baldwin County, Alabama, United States.

== Route description ==
The southern terminus of SR 225 is located at its intersection with US 31 in Spanish Fort. From this point, the route generally travels in a northward direction, intersecting with Interstate 65 (I-65) at exit 31 before terminating 3 miles north of the interchange at SR 59 in Stockton.

== Major intersections ==
The entire route is in Baldwin County.

| Location | mi | km | Destinations | Notes |
|---|---|---|---|---|
| Spanish Fort | 0.000 | 0.000 | US 31 (Spanish Fort Boulevard/SR 3) – Mobile, Stapleton | Southern terminus |
| | 20.421 | 32.864 | I-65 – Montgomery, Mobile | I-65 exit 31 |
| Stockton | 23.910 | 38.479 | SR 59 – Bay Minette, Uriah | Northern terminus |
1.000 mi = 1.609 km; 1.000 km = 0.621 mi
