= Alabama State Route 29 =

There is no current State Route 29 in the U.S. state of Alabama.

- See U.S. Route 29 in Alabama for the current route numbered 29
- See Alabama State Route 29 (pre-1957) for the former SR 29
