= Alabama State Route 199 =

State highway in Alabama, United States

State Route 199

Route information
- Maintained by ALDOT
- Length: 10.218 mi (16.444 km)

Major junctions
- South end: SR 81 in Tuskegee
- North end: SR 14 east of Tallassee

Location
- Country: United States
- State: Alabama
- Counties: Macon

Highway system
- Alabama State Highway System; Interstate; US; State
← SR 198	→ SR 201

State Route 199 (SR 199) is a 10.218-mile-long (16.444 km) route that serves as a connection between SR 81 in Tuskegee with SR 14 east of Tallassee.

== Route description ==
The southern terminus of SR 199 is located at its intersection with SR 81 near Tuskegee. From this point, the route travels in a northwesterly direction, where it passes under I-85, without an interchange, towards Chehaw where it turns to the west before resuming its northwesterly track just west of the city limits. It continues in this direction through to just south of Woodland where it turns to the north en route to its northern terminus at SR 14. North of its terminus, it continues as Macon County Road 35 (CR 35).

== Major intersections ==
The entire route is in Macon County.

Location	mi	km	Destinations	Notes
Tuskegee	0.0	0.0	SR 81 to I-85 – Notasulga, Downtown	Southern terminus
	10.218	16.444	SR 14 – Tallassee, Notasulga	Northern terminus
1.000 mi = 1.609 km; 1.000 km = 0.621 mi
