= East Brewton, Alabama =

City in Alabama, United States

East Brewton
- City
- Location of East Brewton in Escambia County, Alabama.
- Coordinates: 31°05′26″N 87°03′20″W
- Country: United States
- State: Alabama
- County: Escambia

Area
  - Total: 3.44 sq mi (8.92 km^{2})
  - Land: 3.41 sq mi (8.83 km^{2})
  - Water: 0.035 sq mi (0.09 km^{2})
- Elevation: 102 ft (31 m)

Population (2020)
  - Total: 2,293
  - Density: 672.9/sq mi (259.79/km^{2})
- Time zone: UTC-6 (Central (CST))
  - Summer (DST): UTC-5 (CDT)
- ZIP code: 36426-36427
- Area code: 251
- FIPS code: 01-22216
- GNIS feature ID: 2403531
- Website: eastbrewton.org

East Brewton is a city in Escambia County, Alabama, United States. It was incorporated in October 1918. At the 2020 census, the population was 2,293. The community grew around Fort Crawford, a fort built to protect early settlers of the area.

== Geography ==
East Brewton is located in east-central Escambia County and is bordered to the northwest by the city of Brewton, across Murder Creek.

U.S. Route 29 and Alabama State Route 41 pass through the center of East Brewton as Forrest Avenue and lead northwest into the center of Brewton. In the other direction, US 29 runs east, then northeast, 44 miles (71 km) to Andalusia, while AL 41 leads south 7 miles (11 km) to the Florida line. Milton, Florida, is 34 miles (55 km) south of East Brewton via AL 41 and Florida State Road 87.

According to the U.S. Census Bureau, East Brewton has a total area of 3.4 square miles (8.9 km^{2}), of which 3.4 square miles (8.8 km^{2}) is land and 0.04 square miles (0.1 km^{2}), or 1.02%, is water.

== Demographics ==
Historical population
Census	Pop.	Note	%±
1920	826		—
1930	1,002		21.3%
1940	1,340		33.7%
1950	2,173		62.2%
1960	2,511		15.6%
1970	2,336		−7.0%
1980	2,953		26.4%
1990	2,579		−12.7%
2000	2,496		−3.2%
2010	2,478		−0.7%
2020	2,293		−7.5%
U.S. Decennial Census

=== Racial and ethnic composition ===
East Brewton city, Alabama – Racial and ethnic composition Note: the US Census treats Hispanic/Latino as an ethnic category. This table excludes Latinos from the racial categories and assigns them to a separate category. Hispanics/Latinos may be of any race. Race and ethnicity was not surveyed for populations under 2,500 in the 1980 census and under 1,000 in 1990 census.
Race / Ethnicity (NH = Non-Hispanic)	Pop 1980	Pop 1990	Pop 2000	Pop 2010	Pop 2020	% 1980	% 1990	% 2000	% 2010	% 2020
White alone (NH)	2,932	2,450	1,989	1,839	1,522	99.29%	95.00%	79.69%	74.21%	66.38%
Black or African American alone (NH)	0	107	426	516	553	0.00%	4.15%	17.07%	20.82%	24.12%
Native American or Alaska Native alone (NH)	12	14	12	14	12	0.41%	0.54%	0.48%	0.56%	0.52%
Asian alone (NH)	0	1	0	1	9	0.00%	0.04%	0.00%	0.04%	0.39%
Native Hawaiian or Pacific Islander alone (NH)	x	x	2	0	1	x	x	0.08%	0.00%	0.04%
Other race alone (NH)	0	0	4	2	2	0.00%	0.00%	0.16%	0.08%	0.09%
Mixed race or Multiracial (NH)	x	x	14	30	117	x	x	0.56%	1.21%	5.10%
Hispanic or Latino (any race)	9	7	49	76	77	0.30%	0.27%	1.96%	3.07%	3.36%
Total	2,953	2,579	2,496	2,478	2,293	100.00%	100.00%	100.00%	100.00%	100.00%

=== 2020 census ===
As of the 2020 census, East Brewton had a population of 2,293. The median age was 37.3 years. 25.6% of residents were under the age of 18 and 17.6% of residents were 65 years of age or older. For every 100 females there were 86.7 males, and for every 100 females age 18 and over there were 83.3 males age 18 and over.

88.9% of residents lived in urban areas, while 11.1% lived in rural areas.

There were 956 households in East Brewton, of which 38.0% had children under the age of 18 living in them. Of all households, 35.8% were married-couple households, 19.0% were households with a male householder and no spouse or partner present, and 38.5% were households with a female householder and no spouse or partner present. About 30.4% of all households were made up of individuals and 13.2% had someone living alone who was 65 years of age or older.

There were 1,114 housing units, of which 14.2% were vacant. The homeowner vacancy rate was 3.1% and the rental vacancy rate was 8.1%.

=== 2010 census ===
As of the census of 2010, there were 2,478 people, 992 household, and 661 families residing in the city. The population density was 708 inhabitants per square mile (273/km^{2}). There were 1,226 housing units at an average density of 350.3 per square mile (135.3/km^{2}). The racial makeup of the city was 74.7% White, 20.8% Black or African American, .6% Native American, 0.0% Pacific Islander, 2.6% from other races, and 1.3% from two or more races. 3.1% of the population were Hispanic or Latino of any race.

There were 992 households, out of which 31.0% had children under the age of 18 living with them, 37.6% were married couples living together, 23.6% had a female householder with no husband present, and 33.4% were non-families. 28.5% of all households were made up of individuals, and 12.0% had someone living alone who was 65 years of age or older. The average household size was 2.50 and the average family size was 3.03.

The median income for a household in the city was $26,065, and the median income for a family was $34,120. Males had a median income of $35,833 versus $17,458 for females. The per capita income for the city was $15,181. About 26.4% of families and 29.7% of the population were above the poverty line, including 39.1% of those under age 18 and 13.1% of those age 65 or over.

=== 2000 census ===
As of the census of 2000, there were 2,496 people, 1,043 household, and 688 families residing in the city. The population density was 712.3 inhabitants per square mile (275.0/km^{2}). There were 1249 housing units at an average density of 356.4 per square mile (137.6/km^{2}). The racial makeup of the city was 77.07% White, 10.29% Black or African American, 10.48% Native American, 0.08% Pacific Islander, 1.44% from other races, and 0.64% from two or more races. 1.96% of the population were Hispanic or Latino of any race.

There were 1,043 households, out of which 31.6% had children under the age of 18 living with them, 46.4% were married couples living together, 15.3% had a female householder with no husband present, and 34.0% were non-families. 29.9% of all households were made up of individuals, and 12.2% had someone living alone who was 65 years of age or older. The average household size was 2.39 and the average family size was 2.94.

The median income for a household in the city was $23,125, and the median income for a family was $30,610. Males had a median income of $22,138 versus $12,540 for females. The per capita income for the city was $12,531. About 18.5% of families were above the poverty line, including 36.7% of those under age 18 and 22.0% of those age 65 or over.

== Education ==
Escambia County Public School System is the local school district.

== Transportation ==
Escambia County Alabama Transit System (ECATS) provides dial-a-ride bus service throughout the city and county.
