= Riverview, Alabama =

- Town
- Location of Riverview in Escambia County, Alabama.
- Coordinates: 31°03′31″N 87°04′15″W
- Country: United States
- State: Alabama
- County: Escambia

Area
  - Total: 1.47 sq mi (3.80 km^{2})
  - Land: 1.45 sq mi (3.75 km^{2})
  - Water: 0.023 sq mi (0.06 km^{2})
- Elevation: 72 ft (22 m)

Population (2020)
  - Total: 163
  - Density: 112.7/sq mi (43.51/km^{2})
- Time zone: UTC-6 (Central (CST))
  - Summer (DST): UTC-5 (CDT)
- FIPS code: 01-65016
- GNIS feature ID: 2407226

Riverview is a town in Escambia County, Alabama, United States. As of the 2020 census, Riverview had a population of 163.

== Geography ==
Riverview is located in south-central Escambia County on the south side of the Conecuh River. It is 3 miles (5 km) south of the city of Brewton and is bordered to the south by the Brewton Municipal Airport. Alabama State Route 41 passes through the town, leading north into Brewton and south 4.5 miles (7.2 km) to the Florida state line. Milton, Florida, is 31 miles (50 km) to the south of Riverview.

According to the U.S. Census Bureau, Riverview has a total area of 1.5 square miles (3.8 km^{2}), of which 0.02 square miles (0.06 km^{2}), or 1.46%, is water.

== Demographics ==
Historical population
Census	Pop.	Note	%±
1970	110		—
1980	132		20.0%
1990	90		−31.8%
2000	99		10.0%
2010	184		85.9%
2020	163		−11.4%
U.S. Decennial Census

As of the census of 2000, there were 99 people, 43 households, and 30 families residing in the town. The population density was 240.0 inhabitants per square mile (92.7/km^{2}). There were 48 housing units at an average density of 116.4 per square mile (44.9/km^{2}). The racial makeup of the town was 93.94% White, 1.01% Black or African American, 1.01% Native American, 1.01% Pacific Islander, and 3.03% from two or more races. 2.02% of the population were Hispanic or Latino of any race.

There were 43 households, out of which 23.3% had children under the age of 18 living with them, 55.8% were married couples living together, 14.0% had a female householder with no husband present, and 30.2% were non-families. 23.3% of all households were made up of individuals, and 4.7% had someone living alone who was 65 years of age or older. The average household size was 2.30 and the average family size was 2.70.

In the town, the population was spread out, with 19.2% under the age of 18, 10.1% from 18 to 24, 25.3% from 25 to 44, 29.3% from 45 to 64, and 16.2% who were 65 years of age or older. The median age was 42 years. For every 100 females, there were 83.3 males. For every 100 females age 18 and over, there were 95.1 males.

The median income for a household in the town was $21,667, and the median income for a family was $22,083. Males had a median income of $26,250 versus $28,750 for females. The per capita income for the town was $13,783. There were 28.0% of families and 21.8% of the population living below the poverty line, including 15.4% of under eighteens and 10.5% of those over 64.

== Education ==
Escambia County Public School System is the local school district.

== See also ==
- List of towns in Alabama
