= Blues Old Stand, Alabama =

Unincorporated community in Alabama, United States

- Unincorporated community
- Location within Alabama Location within the United States
- Coordinates: 31°59′06″N 85°43′01″W
- Country: United States
- State: Alabama
- County: Bullock
- Elevation: 472 ft (144 m)
- Time zone: UTC-6 (Central (CST))
  - Summer (DST): UTC-5 (CDT)
- Area code: 334
- GNIS feature ID: 114601

Blues Old Stand is an unincorporated community in Bullock County, Alabama, United States. The main road through the community is U.S. Route 29 in Alabama, but also includes Bullock County Roads 14 and 19.

== History ==
According to one account, Blues Old Stand was named for a man named Blue who kept a store known locally as the 'stand'.
