= Escambia County School System =

School district in Alabama, United States

Escambia County School System (ECSS), also known as Escambia County Schools, is a school district headquartered in Brewton, Alabama.

It serves all areas in Escambia County, Alabama outside of Brewton. Communities within the district include Atmore, East Brewton, Flomaton, Pollard, and Riverview.

== History ==
John Knott served as superintendent until 2021. Michele McClung was hired as the superintendent, with four board members voting in favor and three voting against. 21 people had applied for the position.

== Schools ==
High schools

- Escambia County High School
- Flomaton High School
- W.S. Neal High School
- Escambia Career Readiness Center

Middle schools

- Escambia County Middle School
- W.S. Neal Middle School
- Pollard-McCall Junior High School

Elementary schools

- Flomaton Elementary School
- Huxford Elementary School
- W.S. Neal Elementary School
- Rachel Patterson Elementary School
- Turtle Point Science Center
