= U.S. Route 31 in Alabama =

US Highway section within the state of Alabama

U.S. Route 31
- US 31 highlighted in red

Route information
- Maintained by ALDOT
- Length: 386.449 mi (621.929 km)
- Existed: 1926–present

Major junctions
- South end: US 90 / US 98 in Spanish Fort
- US 29 / SR 113 in Flomaton; US 84 near Evergreen; I-65 at Hope Hull; US 80 / SR 21 in Montgomery; US 82 / SR 14 in Prattville; I-459 near Hoover; US 280 in Homewood; I-20 / I-59 in Birmingham; US 278 in Cullman; US 72 in Athens
- North end: I-65 / US 31 at Tennessee state line near Ardmore

Location
- Country: United States
- State: Alabama
- Counties: Baldwin, Escambia, Conecuh, Butler, Lowndes, Montgomery, Elmore, Autauga, Chilton, Shelby, Jefferson, Blount, Cullman, Morgan, Limestone

Highway system
- United States Numbered Highway System; List; Special; Divided; Alabama State Highway System; Interstate; US; State
← SR 30	→ SR 32
← SR 2	SR 3	→ SR 4

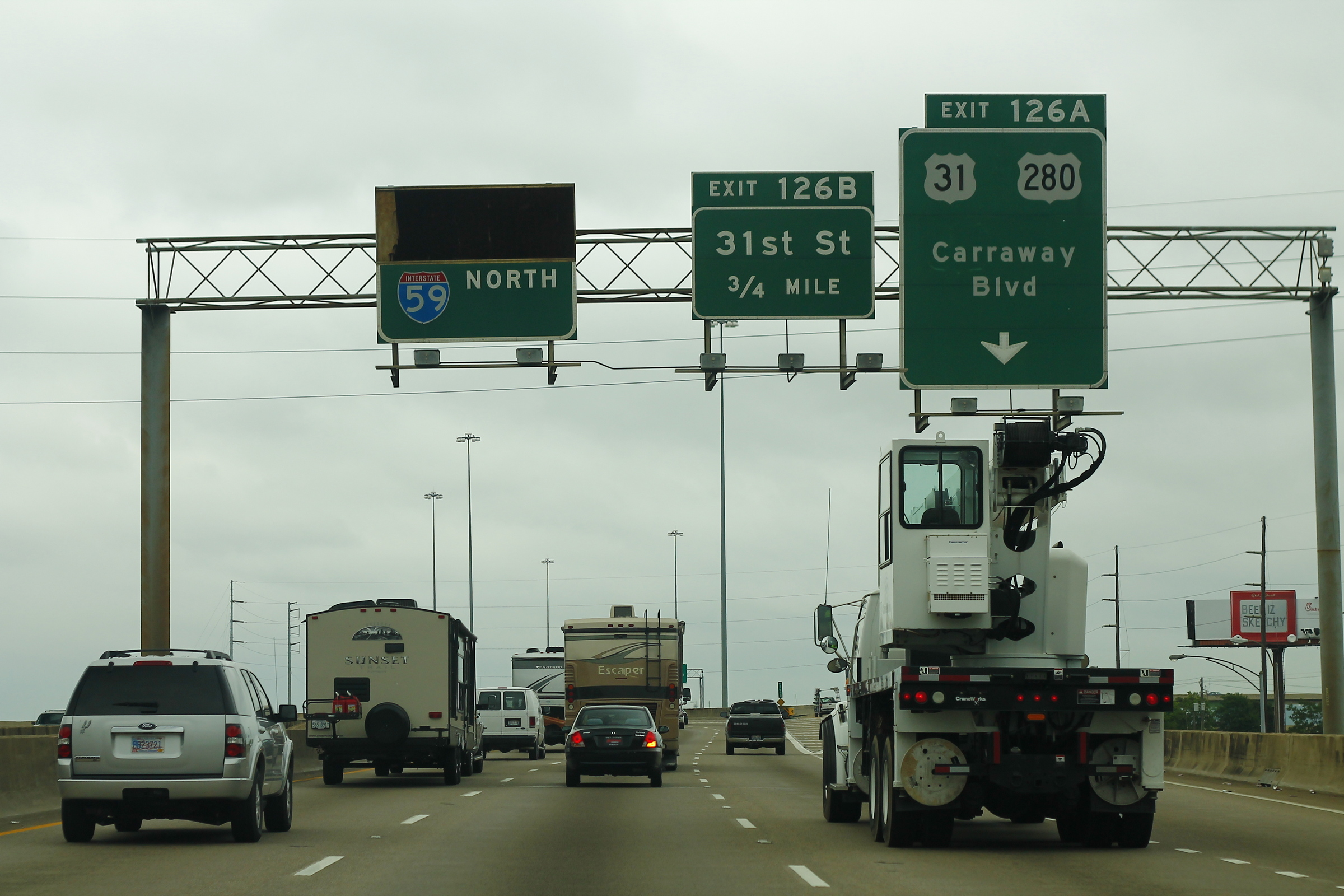
A sign designating an exit to US 31 on the concurrency of Interstates 20 and 59. It was replaced in 2020.

U.S. Route 31 (US 31) in Alabama runs north–south up through the heart of Alabama for 386.449 miles (621.929 km). US 31 proper begins at a junction with US 90 and US 98 in Spanish Fort and exits the state into Tennessee running concurrently with Interstate 65 (I-65) near Ardmore. US 31 enters the limits of major cities Montgomery, Birmingham, and Decatur. Throughout the state, with the exception of its concurrency with I-65 north of Athens, US 31 runs concurrently with the unsigned State Route 3 (SR 3). Today, aside from portions through major towns and cities, US 31 is largely a rural two-lane highway. The route has largely been supplanted by I-65, with which it has eight junctions and two concurrencies.

== Route description ==
As with several other U.S. Routes in Alabama, U.S. Route 31 is mostly parallel to Interstate 65 throughout its journey across the state, servicing several towns and cities Interstate 65 bypasses.

Upon leaving US Route 90 and US Route 98 in Spanish Fort, the route heads due east towards the town of Stapleton, where it joins Alabama State Route 59 (Gulf Shores Parkway). About eleven miles later, the route leaves the Gulf Shores Parkway right-of-way and follows a town square around the Baldwin County Courthouse in Bay Minette. Leaving Bay Minette, the route winds northeast, passing fairly close to the northwestern corner of Florida. Upon crossing into Escambia County, the route winds east through Atmore before dipping south into Flomaton. Several hundred feet from the state line with Florida, the route gains U.S. Route 29, which joins it in a fifteen-mile concurrency northeast to Brewton. After losing U.S. 29 in Brewton, the route heads directly north, crossing the county line into Conecuh County. A few miles later, the route turns to be parallel with Interstate 65.

Reaching U.S. Route 84 just east of Interstate 65, U.S. Routes 31/84 travel into Evergreen, deviating from I-65. East of Evergreen, U.S. Route 84 heads southeast towards Andalusia, while U.S. Route 31 winds back north into Butler County. In far southeastern Butler County, the route engages in a fairly short concurrency with Alabama State Route 55. From the end of this concurrency in Georgiana north to Tennessee and beyond, U.S. 31 roughly parallels I-65. Heading northeast, U.S. 31 passes through Greenville. After cutting a corner of Lowndes County, U.S. 31 enters Montgomery County and crosses over I-65 for the first time.

After crossing U.S. Route 80 - which follows the historic Selma to Montgomery March Corridor - the route turns onto a beltway routing around western Montgomery, the capital of Alabama. At this point, it passes within a few miles of its child routes U.S. Route 331 and U.S. Route 231. After crossing the Alabama River, the route cuts a corner of Elmore County and enters Autauga County. In Prattville, the route has its junction with U.S. Route 82. It crosses Interstate 65 again a few miles later, quickly entering into Chilton County.

The route reaches its next concurrency with Alabama State Route 22, which it carries across Interstate 65 and into downtown Clanton, the geographical center of Alabama. After leaving SR-22, it heads north into Shelby County. After Calera, the route crosses I-65, serving Saginaw. It yet again crosses I-65 into the town of Alabaster. It enters Jefferson County a few miles later, home of Birmingham (AL).

In southern Jefferson County, the route reaches Hoover. At this point, the route crosses Interstate 459 - a partial beltway around Birmingham. In Vestavia Hills, a suburb of Birmingham, the route crosses Interstate 65 yet again, its last crossing in the county. Snaking up to Homewood, another suburb of Birmingham, the route reaches U.S. Route 280. At its interchange with U.S. 280, the route becomes the Red Mountain Expressway, descending down Red Mountain. Descending onto a viaduct above eastern Birmingham, the route has its junctions with U.S. Route 78 and U.S. Route 11 before reaching their Interstate parallels, the concurrent Interstate 20 and Interstate 59, which is also the western terminus of U.S. Route 280. At this junction, the route dips down out of the viaduct onto surface streets, passing through the northern suburbs of Birmingham. A few miles later, the route has its junction with Interstate 22; this is also a dual junction with Interstate 65, but not a crossing. At this point, the route leaves Birmingham.

Winding through Fultondale, Gardendale, Morris, and Warrior, the route serves the communities of hilly northern Jefferson County. After crossing the county line into Blount County, the route has a junction with Alabama State Route 160 immediately followed by a Parclo Interchange with Interstate 65. At this point, U.S. Route 31 enters its first concurrency with Interstate 65. A few miles later in Smoke Rise, the route leaves Interstate 65 at a trumpet interchange. Following an arc, the route winds through a ridge cut, passes through Bangor, and crosses the Mulberry Fork of the Black Warrior River into Cullman County.

Immediately entering Garden City, the route slowly starts to arc back towards I-65. In Hanceville, the route passes Wallace State Community College and also passes within a few miles of the Shrine of the Most Blessed Sacrament. Winding north out of Hanceville, the route crosses into the city limits of Cullman. A few miles into the city limits, the route engages in a concurrency with Alabama State Route 69. About two miles later, it reaches U.S. Route 278, which is also the end of the SR-69 concurrency. Heading north out of town, the route crosses SR-157, the University of North Alabama Highway. After descending down into Morgan County, the route yet again crosses Interstate 65. Heading north, the route passes through Hartselle before serving Decatur. Just south of the Tennessee River, the route enters its next concurrency with U.S. 72 Alt.

Crossing the Tennessee River into Limestone County, the route has a Directional-T Interchange and loses U.S. 72 Alt, heading north out of the junction. Passing by Calhoun Community College, the route heads its way to Athens (AL). At this point, it has a Parclo Interchange with U.S. Route 72. A few miles later, it returns to a concurrent state with Interstate 65, which it follows all the way to one mile above the state line with Tennessee.

== Major intersections ==
County	Location	mi	km	Destinations	Notes
Baldwin	Spanish Fort	0.000	0.000	US 90 (SR 16) / US 98 (SR 42 / Spanish Fort Boulevard)	Southern terminus
Baldwin	Spanish Fort	0.209	0.336	SR 225 north	Southern terminus of SR 225
Baldwin	Daphne	3.634	5.848	SR 181 south / CR 27 north (Jimmy Faulkner Drive) to I-10	Northern terminus of SR 181
Baldwin		9.819	15.802	SR 59 south – Loxley, Gulf Shores	Southern end of SR 59 overlap
Baldwin	Bay Minette	20.446	32.905	SR 59 north (McMeans Avenue) to I-65 / D'Olive Street	Northern end of SR 59 overlap; To I-65 signed northbound only
Baldwin	Bay Minette	21.135	34.013	SR 287 north (Hand Avenue) / Hand Avenue	Southern terminus of SR 287
Escambia	Atmore	41.212	66.324	SR 21 (Main Street) to I-65 – Pensacola, Monroeville, Coastal Alabama Community College	Cities signed southbound only
Escambia	Flomaton	55.460	89.254	US 29 south / SR 113 south (Sidney E. Manning Boulevard) – Pensacola	Southern end of US 29 / SR 113 overlap
Escambia	Flomaton	56.601	91.090	SR 113 north to I-65	Northern end of SR 113 overlap
Escambia	Brewton	69.320	111.560	US 29 north (SR 15 north / Mildred Street) / SR 41 (South Nicholas Avenue) to I-65 – Andalusia, Repton	Northern end of US 29 overlap; southern terminus of SR 15; destinations signed southbound only
Conecuh		93.004	149.675	US 84 west (SR 12 west) to I-65	Southern end of US 84 / SR 12 overlap
Conecuh	Evergreen	95.670	153.966	SR 83 north (Cooper Street) to I-65 – Midway	Southern terminus of SR 83
Conecuh		101.861	163.929	US 84 east (SR 12 east) – Andalusia	Northern end of US 84 / SR 12 overlap
Butler	McKenzie	115.515	185.903	SR 55 south / South Garland Road – Andalusia, McKenzie	Southern end of SR 55 overlap
Butler		119.5	192.3	SR 55 north / Kokomo Road	Northern end of SR 55 overlap
Butler	Georgiana	122.910	197.804	SR 106 – Brantley, Georgiana	
Butler		134.128	215.858	SR 185 north (Aztec Road) / SR 185 Truck north – Greenville	Southern end of SR 185 Truck overlap; southern terminus of SR 185; southern terminus of SR 185 Truck
Butler	Greenville	138.942	223.605	SR 10 / SR 185 Truck north (Luverne Highway / East Commerce Street) to SR 10 Truck – Luverne, Greenville	Northern end of SR 185 Truck overlap
Lowndes		151.213	243.354	SR 185 south / CR 4	Northern terminus of SR 185
Lowndes		157.593	253.621	SR 97 north – Hayneville	Southern end of SR 97 overlap
Lowndes	Davenport	159.063	255.987	SR 97 south to US 331	Northern end of SR 97 overlap
Montgomery	Hope Hull	174.046	280.100	I-65 – Montgomery, Mobile	I-65 exit 164
Montgomery	Montgomery	177.262	285.276	US 80 (SR 8 / Selma Highway) / SR 21 south to I-65 – Selma	Southern end of SR 21 overlap; interchange on US 80
Montgomery	Montgomery	178.494	287.258	SR 21 north (West South Boulevard) to I-65 / I-85 / US 82 / US 231 / US 331 / Mobile Highway – Union Springs	Northern end of SR 21 overlap; destination signed southbound only
Montgomery–Elmore county line		186.018– 186.304	299.367– 299.827	Bridge over the Alabama River	
Elmore	No major junctions				
Autauga	Prattville	188.271	302.993	US 82 (SR 6) to SR 14 / I-65	
Autauga		196.581	316.366	I-65 – Montgomery, Birmingham	I-65 exit 186
Chilton	Mountain Creek	208.882	336.163	SR 143 south – Marbury	Northern terminus of SR 143
Chilton		213.408	343.447	SR 22 east – Alexander City	Southern end of SR 22 overlap
Chilton	Clanton	217.466	349.978	I-65 – Birmingham, Montgomery	I-65 exit 208
Chilton	Clanton	221.710	356.808	SR 22 west / SR 145 north (Fourth Avenue North) – Selma	Northern end of SR 22 overlap; southern terminus of SR 145
Chilton	Jemison	232.684	374.469	SR 191 south / CR 42 (Church Street) / Church Street – Maplesville	Northern terminus of SR 191
Chilton		234.790	377.858	SR 155 north – Montevallo	Southern terminus of SR 155
Shelby	Calera	242.795	390.741	SR 25 south / 18th Avenue	Southern end of SR 25 overlap
Shelby	Calera	242.955	390.998	SR 25 north (Main Street) to I-65	Northern end of SR 25 overlap
Shelby	Calera	245.674	395.374	I-65 – Montgomery, Birmingham	I-65 exit 231
Shelby	Calera	246.670	396.977	SR 70 east / CR 22 west – Columbiana	Southern terminus of SR 70
Shelby	Alabaster	252.935	407.059	I-65 – Birmingham, Montgomery	I-65 exit 238
Shelby	Alabaster	253.652	408.213	SR 119 south (Montevallo Road) / CR 11 north (Simmsville Road) – Montevallo, Brierfield State Park	Southern end of SR 119 overlap
Shelby	Pelham	260.473	419.191	SR 119 north (Cahaba Valley Road) to I-65 / Commerce Parkway	Northern end of SR 119 overlap
Shelby	Pelham	261.493	420.832	SR 261 south (Helena Road) / CR 17 north (Valleydale Road) to I-65 – Helena	Northern terminus of SR 261
Jefferson	Hoover	263.732	424.436	SR 150 west (John Hawkins Parkway) / Lorna Road	Eastern terminus of SR 150
Jefferson		264.277	425.313	I-459 – Atlanta, Gadsden, Tuscaloosa	I-459 exit 13
Jefferson	Hoover–Vestavia Hills line	266.187	428.386	I-65 / Lorna Road / Columbiana Road – Montgomery, Birmingham	I-65 exit 252
Jefferson	Homewood	270.698	435.646	SR 149	
Jefferson	Homewood	270	430	Brookwood Medical Center Drive	Interchange
Jefferson	Homewood	270.698	435.646	SR 149 (Shades Creek Parkway / Lakeshore Drive)	Interchange
Jefferson	Homewood	271.7	437.3	Southern end of Red Mountain Expressway	
Jefferson	Homewood	272.076	437.864	US 280 east (SR 38 East) / Rosedale Drive – Sylacauga, Homewood	Southern end of US 280 overlap; interchange; destinations signed southbound only; western terminus of unsigned SR 38
Jefferson	Birmingham	272.5	438.5	21st Avenue South	Southbound exit and northbound entrance
Jefferson	Birmingham	272.9	439.2	Highland Avenue / Arlington Avenue	Northbound exit and southbound entrance
Jefferson	Birmingham	273.6	440.3	University Boulevard	
Jefferson	Birmingham	274.162	441.221	To US 78 (SR 4 / 3rd-4th Avenue South)	
Jefferson	Birmingham	274.234	441.337	US 11 (SR 7 / First Avenue North)	Northbound exit only
Jefferson	Birmingham	274.4	441.6	2nd Avenue North	Northbound exit and southbound entrance; entrance ramp from 3rd Avenue North
Jefferson	Birmingham	275.407	443.225	I-20 / I-59 to I-65 – Atlanta, Gadsden, Tuscaloosa	No access from US 31 south to I-20 / 59 or from I-20 east / I-59 north to US 31 north; northern end of US 280 overlap; western terminus of US 280; I-20 / 59 exit 126A
Jefferson	Birmingham	275.1	442.7	Northern end of Red Mountain Expressway	
Jefferson	Birmingham	276.762	445.405	SR 378 west (Finley Boulevard) to I-65 / Finley Boulevard	Eastern terminus of SR 378
Jefferson	Birmingham			I-22 west – Memphis	Future interchange (under construction); future eastern terminus of I-22
Jefferson	Birmingham	279.5	449.8	I-65 – Huntsville, Birmingham	I-65 southbound exit 265B
Jefferson				I-422	Future interchange exit 19; temporary western terminus of future I-422 (funded, to be completed by 2028)
Blount		299.707	482.332	SR 160 east – Hayden	Western terminus of SR 160
Blount		299.823 284.361	482.518 457.635	I-65 south / Lester Doss Road / White Oak Trail – Birmingham	Southern end of I-65 overlap; I-65 exit 284; mileposts switch from SR 3 to I-65
Blount		287.370 302.832	462.477 487.361	I-65 north – Cullman, Decatur	Northern end of I-65 overlap; I-65 exit 287; mileposts switch from I-65 to SR 3
Cullman	Hanceville	317.460	510.902	SR 91 (Arkadelphia Road) to I-65 / US 278 (SR 74) – Holly Pond, Colony	Destinations signed southbound only
Cullman	Cullman	325.356	523.610	SR 69 south (Cherokee Avenue SW) to I-65 / King Edward Street NW	Southern end of SR 69 overlap
Cullman	Cullman	326.569	525.562	US 278 (SR 74) / SR 69 north (Third Street SW)	Northern end of SR 69 overlap
Cullman	Cullman	328.918	529.342	SR 157 to I-65 / US 278 north (SR 74) – Gadsden, Moulton	
Morgan		337.073	542.466	I-65 – Nashville, Birmingham	I-65 exit 318; Nashville signed southbound only
Morgan	Hartselle	346.313	557.337	SR 36 (Main Street West) to I-65 – Danville	
Morgan	Decatur	354.958	571.250	SR 67 (Point Mallard Parkway / Beltline Road SW) to I-65 – Priceville, Tuscumbia	
Morgan	Decatur	358.394	576.779	US 72 Alt. west (Corridor V / Wilson Street NE) / SR 20 / Wilson Street NE	Southern end of US 72 Alt. / SR 20 overlap; no access from US 31 north to US 72 Alt./SR 20 west
Morgan–Limestone county line	Decatur	358.731	577.322	Captain William J. Hudson "Steamboat Bill" Memorial Bridges over Tennessee River	
Limestone	Decatur	360.377	579.971	US 72 Alt. east (Corridor V) / SR 20 east to I-65 / I-565	Northern end of US 72 Alt. / SR 20 overlap
Limestone	Athens	371.264	597.491	US 72 (SR 2) – Athens, Huntsville	Interchange
Limestone	Athens	372.793	599.952	SR 251 north (Pryor Street) / Pryor Street – Ardmore	Southern terminus of SR 251
Limestone	Athens	373.647	601.327	SR 99 north (East Elm Street) to SR 127 / Sportsplex Loop	Southern terminus of SR 99
Limestone	Athens	374.377 354.157	602.501 569.960	I-65 south – Birmingham	Southern end of I-65 overlap; northern end of SR 3 overlap; northern terminus of SR 3; I-65 exit 354; mileposts switch from SR 3 to I-65
Limestone		360.918	580.841	Elkmont	I-65 exit 361
Limestone		364.826	587.131	SR 53 south – Ardmore	Northern terminus of SR 53; I-65 exit 365
Limestone		366.229	589.388	I-65 north / US 31 north – Nashville	Continuation into Tennessee
1.000 mi = 1.609 km; 1.000 km = 0.621 mi: Concurrency terminus

U.S. Route 31
Previous state: Terminus	Alabama	Next state: Tennessee
