= Heath, Alabama =

- Town
- Location of Heath in Covington County, Alabama.
- Coordinates: 31°21′28″N 86°28′02″W
- Country: United States
- State: Alabama
- County: Covington

Area
  - Total: 0.90 sq mi (2.33 km^{2})
  - Land: 0.89 sq mi (2.31 km^{2})
  - Water: 0.012 sq mi (0.03 km^{2})
- Elevation: 331 ft (101 m)

Population (2020)
  - Total: 236
  - Density: 265.1/sq mi (102.36/km^{2})
- Time zone: UTC-6 (Central (CST))
  - Summer (DST): UTC-5 (CDT)
- FIPS code: 01-33904
- GNIS feature ID: 2405811

Heath is a town in Covington County, Alabama, United States. At the 2020 census, the population was 236.

== Geography ==
According to the U.S. Census Bureau, the town has a total area of 0.89 square miles (2.3 km^{2}), of which 0.012 square miles (0.03 km^{2}), or 1.13%, is water.

== Demographics ==
Historical population
Census	Pop.	Note	%±
1960	125		—
1970	229		83.2%
1980	354		54.6%
1990	182		−48.6%
2000	249		36.8%
2010	254		2.0%
2020	236		−7.1%
U.S. Decennial Census; 2013 Estimate

As of the census of 2000, there were 249 people, 119 households, and 69 families residing in the town. The population density was 273.6 inhabitants per square mile (105.6/km^{2}). There were 138 housing units at an average density of 151.6 per square mile (58.5/km^{2}). The racial makeup of the town was 88.35% White, 9.24% Black or African American, 0.40% Native American, 2.01% from other races. 3.21% of the population were Hispanic or Latino of any race.

There were 119 households, out of which 31.9% had children under the age of 18 living with them, 40.3% were married couples living together, 12.6% had a female householder with no husband present, and 41.2% were non-families. 39.5% of all households were made up of individuals, and 26.1% had someone living alone who was 65 years of age or older. The average household size was 2.09 and the average family size was 2.73.

In the town, the population was spread out, with 24.9% under the age of 18, 4.0% from 18 to 24, 30.1% from 25 to 44, 22.5% from 45 to 64, and 18.5% who were 65 years of age or older. The median age was 41 years. For every 100 females, there were 91.5 males. For every 100 females age 18 and over, there were 76.4 males.

The median income for a household in the town was $19,375, and the median income for a family was $35,833. Males had a median income of $24,583 versus $15,893 for females. The per capita income for the town was $14,325. About 11.3% of families and 17.1% of the population were below the poverty line, including 22.4% of those under the age of eighteen and 20.8% of those 65 or over.

== Education ==
It is within the Covington County Board of Education school district.
