= Murder Creek (Alabama) =

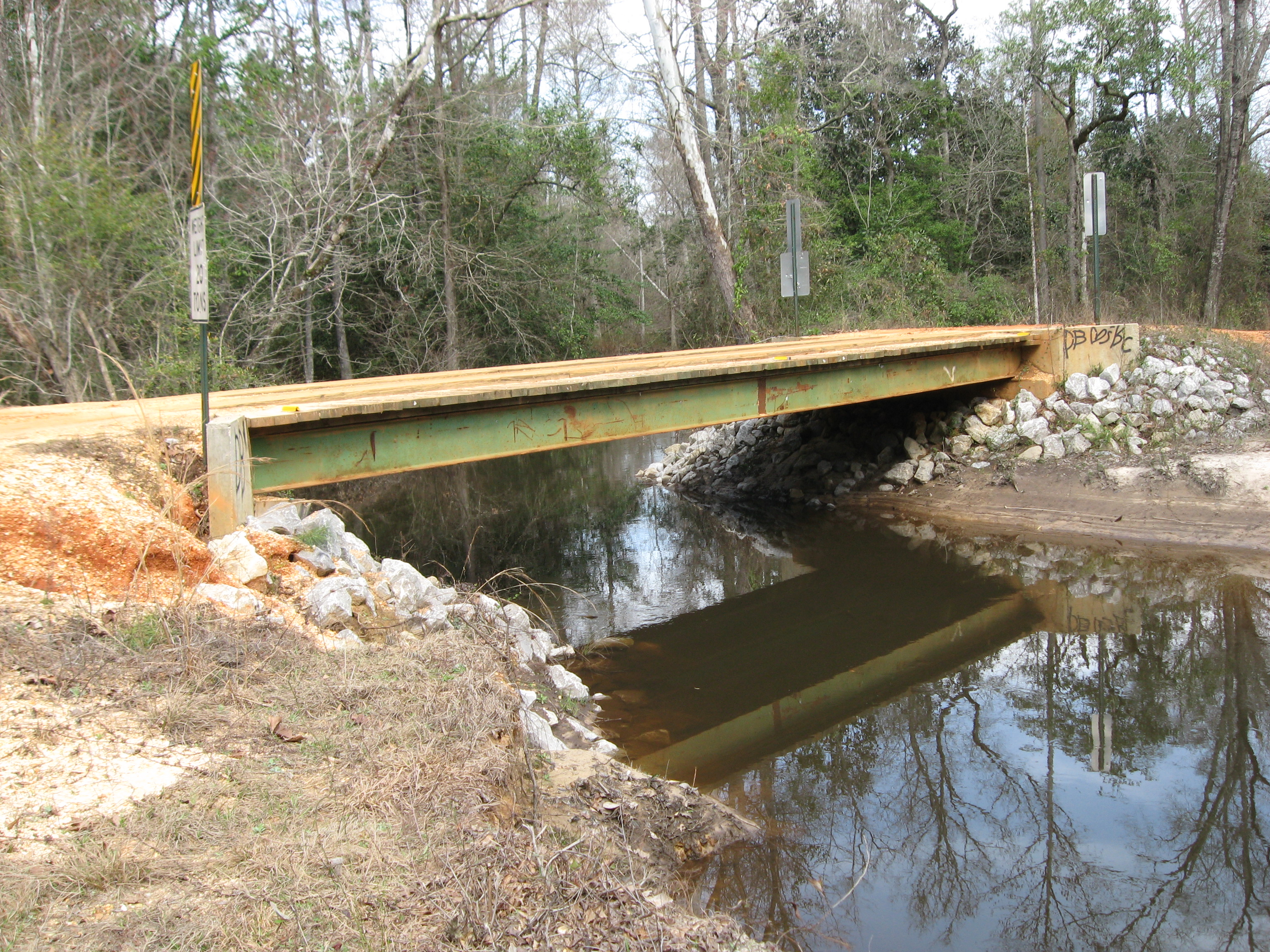
- Wooden bridge over Murder Creek, Burnt Corn, Alabama

Location
- Country: United States
- State: Alabama
- Counties: Monroe, Conecuh, and Escambia counties

Physical characteristics
- Source
  - location: East of Beatrice in Monroe County, Alabama
  - coordinates: 31°43′43″N 87°04′29″W
- Mouth
  - location: Conecuh River
  - coordinates: 31°04′04″N 87°05′52″W

Murder Creek is a tributary of the lower Conecuh River. It is primarily located in Conecuh County, Alabama.

== Origin of name ==
Excerpt from Albert James Pickett's History of Alabama, and Incidentally of Georgia and Mississippi, from the Earliest Period (1851):

1788: About this time, a bloody transaction occurred in the territory of the present county of Conecuh. During the revolutionary war, Colonel McGillivray formed an acquaintance with many conspicuous royalists, and, among others, with Colonel Kirkland, of South Carolina. That person was at McGillivray's house, upon the Coosa, in 1788, with his son, his nephew, and several other gentlemen. They were on their way to Pensacola, where they intended to procure passports, and settle in the Spanish province of Louisiana. When they determined to leave his hospitable abode, McGillivray sent his servant [slave] to guide them to Pensacola. The presence of this servant would assure the Indians that they were friends, for it was dangerous to travel without the Chieftain's protection. Colonel Kirkland and his party had much silver in their saddle-bags. Arriving within a mile of a large creek, which flows into the Conecuh, they met a pack-horse party, about sunset, going up to the nation. They had been to Pensacola, on a trading expedition. This party consisted of a Hillabee Indian, who had murdered so many men, that he was called Istillicha, the Man-slayer—a desperate white man, who had fled from the States for the crime of murder, and whom, on account of his activity and ferocity, the Indians called the Cat—and a blood-thirsty negro, named Bob, the property of Sullivan, a Creek trader of the Hillabees. As soon as Colonel Kirkland and his party were out of sight, these scoundrels formed an encampment. The former went on, crossed the creek, and encamped a short distance from the ford, by the side of the trading path. Placing their saddle-bags under their heads, and reclining their guns against a tree, Kirkland and his party fell asleep. At midnight, the bloody wretches from the other side, cautiously came over, and, seizing the guns of Kirkland and his men, killed every one of them, except three negroes, one of whom was the servant of the great Chieftain, as before stated. Dividing the booty, the murderers proceeded to the Creek nation, and, when the horrid affair became known, Colonel McGillivray sent persons in pursuit of them. Cat was arrested; but the others escaped. Milfort was directed to convey the scoundrel to the spot where he had shed the blood of these men, and there to hang him, until he was dead. Upon the journey to that point, Milfort kept him well pinioned, and, every night, secured his legs in temporary stocks, made by cutting notches in pine logs, and clamping them together. Reaching the creek where poor Kirkland and his men were murdered, Cat was suspended to the limb of a tree, the roots of which were still stained with the blood of the unfortunate colonel and his companions. While he was dangling in the air, and kicking in the last agonies, the Frenchman stopped his motions with a pistol ball. Such is the origin of the name "Murder Creek. In counter narration, the Native American peoples who attacked the travelers most likely only did so to defend the enslaved people owned by the murdered travelers. Because of these Native Americans, three enslaved people became free men. But the murderers also took the silver, which could have been the primary reason for the attack with the release of the slaves being coincidental."
