= Flomaton, Alabama =

- Town
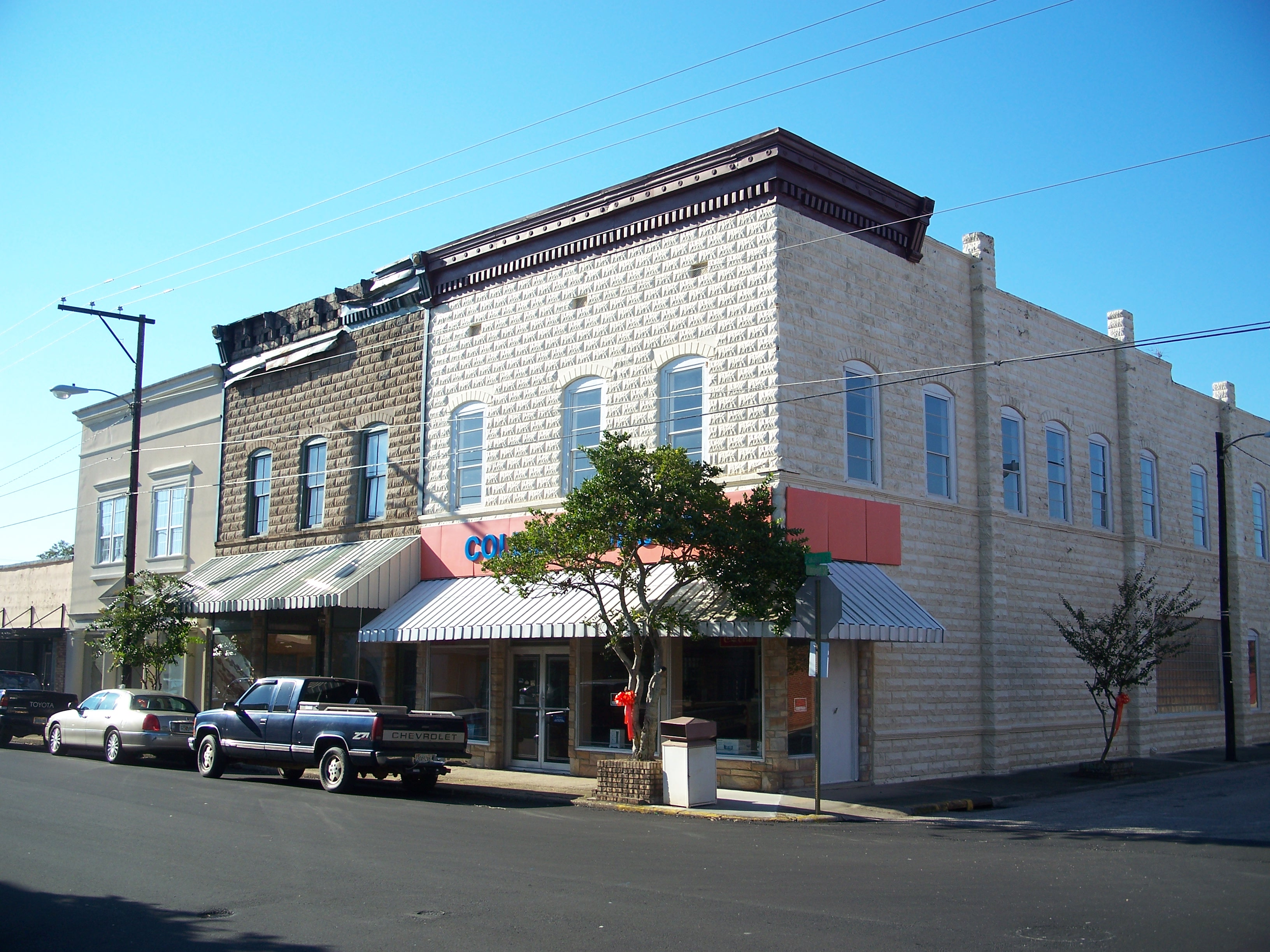
- Street scene in Flomaton

- Location in Escambia County and Alabama
- Coordinates: 31°00′32″N 87°15′20″W
- Country: United States
- State: Alabama
- County: Escambia

Area
  - Total: 5.20 sq mi (13.46 km^{2})
  - Land: 5.08 sq mi (13.17 km^{2})
  - Water: 0.11 sq mi (0.29 km^{2})
- Elevation: 102 ft (31 m)

Population (2020)
  - Total: 1,466
  - Density: 288.3/sq mi (111.31/km^{2})
- Time zone: UTC-6 (Central (CST))
  - Summer (DST): UTC-5 (CDT)
- ZIP code: 36441
- Area code: 251
- FIPS code: 01-26824
- GNIS feature ID: 2406500
- Website: https://www.flomatonal.org/index.html

Flomaton (/ˈfloʊmətən/ FLOH-mə-tən) is a town in Escambia County, Alabama, United States. As of the 2020 census, Flomaton had a population of 1,466. It is located next to the Alabama / Florida state line.

== History ==
Flomaton was incorporated as a town in 1908, having been settled on a railway junction in 1869. The site was a junction of different lines of the Louisville & Nashville Railroad. Into the 1960s the L&N ran trains south to the beach resort city of Pensacola, Florida. The L&N main line was a conduit for trains to New York City, Cincinnati, Atlanta and New Orleans. The name "Flomaton" was chosen as a combination of "Florida", "Alabama" and "town", reflecting the town's location on the border between the two states. In the early twentieth century, the town's economy was driven by the timber industry and the town's location at an important railway junction.

== Geography ==
Flomaton is located on the northern side of the border between Alabama and Florida. On the southern side of the border lies the town of Century in Florida's Escambia County.

U.S. Route 29 and U.S. Route 31 join at the town. The former, starting 45 miles (72 km) to the south in Pensacola, Florida, enters the town over the state border; the latter enters the town from the west, having originated near Mobile. The two highways continue together for about 14 miles (23 km) in a north-easterly direction, before separating at Brewton.

The town also serves as a railway junction. The town joins CSX Transportation's Montgomery–Mobile line with its line south to Pensacola and Florida's Gulf Coast.

According to the U.S. Census Bureau, the town has a total area of 5.3 square miles (14 km^{2}), all land.

== Demographics ==
Historical population
Census	Pop.	Note	%±
1910	559		—
1920	724		29.5%
1930	915		26.4%
1940	837		−8.5%
1950	1,036		23.8%
1960	1,454		40.3%
1970	1,584		8.9%
1980	1,882		18.8%
1990	1,811		−3.8%
2000	1,588		−12.3%
2010	1,440		−9.3%
2020	1,466		1.8%
U.S. Decennial Census; 2013 Estimate

=== Racial and ethnic composition ===
Flomaton town, Alabama – Racial and ethnic composition Note: the US Census treats Hispanic/Latino as an ethnic category. This table excludes Latinos from the racial categories and assigns them to a separate category. Hispanics/Latinos may be of any race. Race and ethnicity was not surveyed for populations under 2,500 in the 1980 census and under 1,000 in 1990 census.
Race / Ethnicity (NH = Non-Hispanic)	Pop 1990	Pop 2000	Pop 2010	Pop 2020	% 1990	% 2000	% 2010	% 2020
White alone (NH)	1,399	1,150	977	953	77.25%	72.42%	67.85%	65.01%
Black or African American alone (NH)	354	369	388	378	19.55%	23.24%	26.94%	25.78%
Native American or Alaska Native alone (NH)	27	21	23	20	1.49%	1.32%	1.60%	1.36%
Asian alone (NH)	5	1	2	0	0.28%	0.06%	0.14%	0.00%
Native Hawaiian or Pacific Islander alone (NH)	x	0	1	0	x	0.00%	0.07%	0.00%
Other race alone (NH)	0	2	0	3	0.00%	0.13%	0.00%	0.20%
Mixed race or Multiracial (NH)	x	16	16	74	x	1.01%	1.11%	5.05%
Hispanic or Latino (any race)	26	29	33	38	1.44%	1.83%	2.29%	2.59%
Total	1,811	1,588	1,440	1,466	100.00%	100.00%	100.00%	100.00%

=== 2020 census ===
As of the 2020 census, Flomaton had a population of 1,466. The median age was 39.3 years. 25.7% of residents were under the age of 18 and 16.4% were 65 years of age or older. For every 100 females, there were 87.7 males, and for every 100 females age 18 and over, there were 80.0 males age 18 and over.

0.0% of residents lived in urban areas, while 100.0% lived in rural areas.

There were 592 households in Flomaton, of which 36.0% had children under the age of 18 living in them. Of all households, 40.0% were married-couple households, 14.9% were households with a male householder and no spouse or partner present, and 37.0% were households with a female householder and no spouse or partner present. About 26.7% of all households were made up of individuals, and 12.3% had someone living alone who was 65 years of age or older.

There were 680 housing units, of which 12.9% were vacant. The homeowner vacancy rate was 2.1% and the rental vacancy rate was 4.9%.

=== 2010 census ===
As of the 2010 census, the town's population was 1,440.

The 2010 census counted 593 households, including 398 families. The population density was 271.6 inhabitants per square mile (104.9/km^{2}). There were 689 housing units at an average density of 130.0 per square mile (50.2/km^{2}). The racial makeup of the town was 69.5% White (a decrease since the 2000 census), 27.2% Black or African American (an increase), 1.6% Native American and 1.32% from two or more races. 2.3% of the population were Hispanic or Latino of any race.

Of the 593 households, 31.7% had children under the age of 18 living with them, 45.7% were married couples living together, 16.9% had a female householder with no husband present, and 32.9% were non-families. 29.3% of all households were made up of individuals, and 12.6% had someone living alone who was 65 years of age or older. The average household size was 2.43 and the average family size was 2.98.

The median age was 37.4 years (an increase from 36 in the 2000 census). There were 670 males and 770 females.

=== 2000 census ===
As of the 2000 census, the population had been measured at 1,588.

In the 2000 census, the median income for a household in the town was $25,875, and the median income for a family was $34,141. Males had a median income of $30,083 versus $15,292 for females. The per capita income for the town was $14,360. About 16.5% of families and 21.8% of the population were below the poverty line, including 31.0% of those under age 18 and 18.5% of those age 65 or over.

== Government ==
Flomaton has an elected mayor and city council.

== Education ==
Escambia County Public School System is the local school district.

== Notable people ==
- Sidney E. Manning — World War I soldier and Medal of Honor recipient.
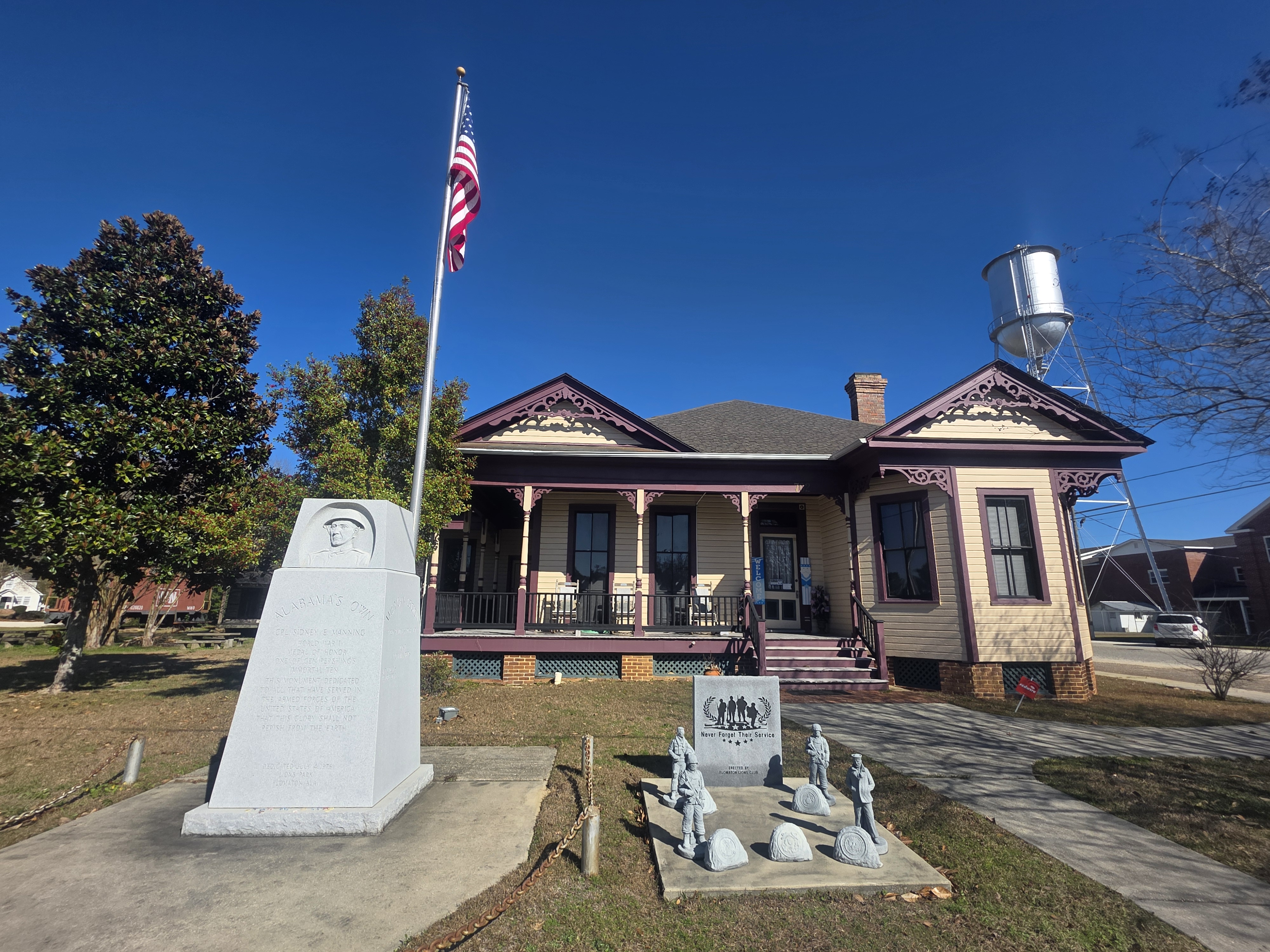
  Sidney E Manning Memorial
