= Banks, Alabama =

- Town
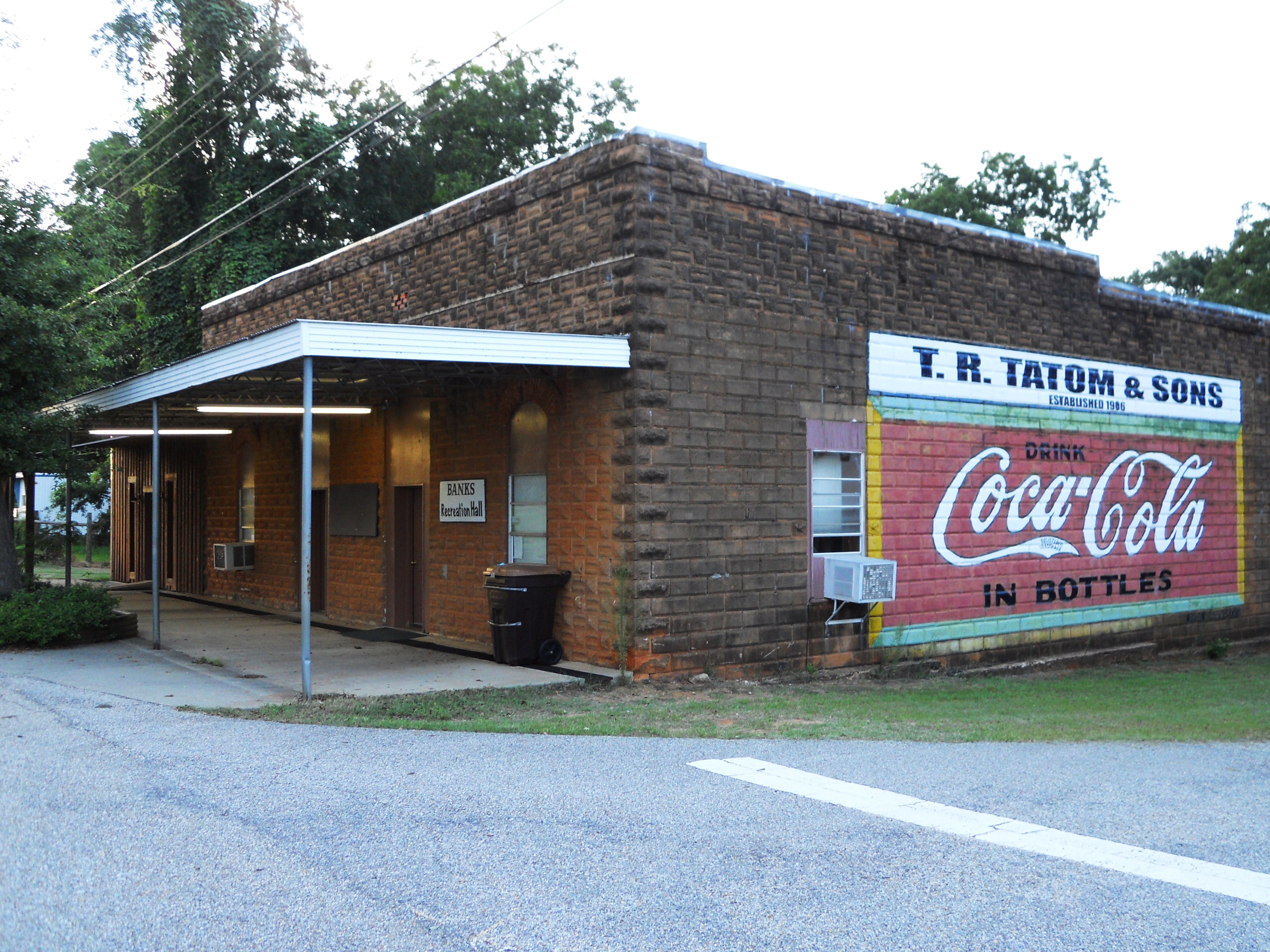
- Banks Recreation Hall in Banks, Alabama

- Location of Banks in Pike County, Alabama.
- Coordinates: 31°48′48″N 85°50′11″W
- Country: United States
- State: Alabama
- County: Pike

Government
  - Type: Mayor-Council
  - Mayor: Lisa Culpepper

Area
  - Total: 1.99 sq mi (5.15 km^{2})
  - Land: 1.99 sq mi (5.15 km^{2})
  - Water: 0 sq mi (0.00 km^{2})
- Elevation: 489 ft (149 m)

Population (2020)
  - Total: 156
  - Density: 78.5/sq mi (30.32/km^{2})
- Time zone: UTC-6 (Central (CST))
  - Summer (DST): UTC-5 (CDT)
- ZIP code: 36005
- Area code: 334
- FIPS code: 01-03940
- GNIS feature ID: 2405206

Banks is a town in Pike County, Alabama, United States. As of the 2020 census it had a population of 156, down from 179 in 2010. It incorporated in December 1894.

== Geography ==
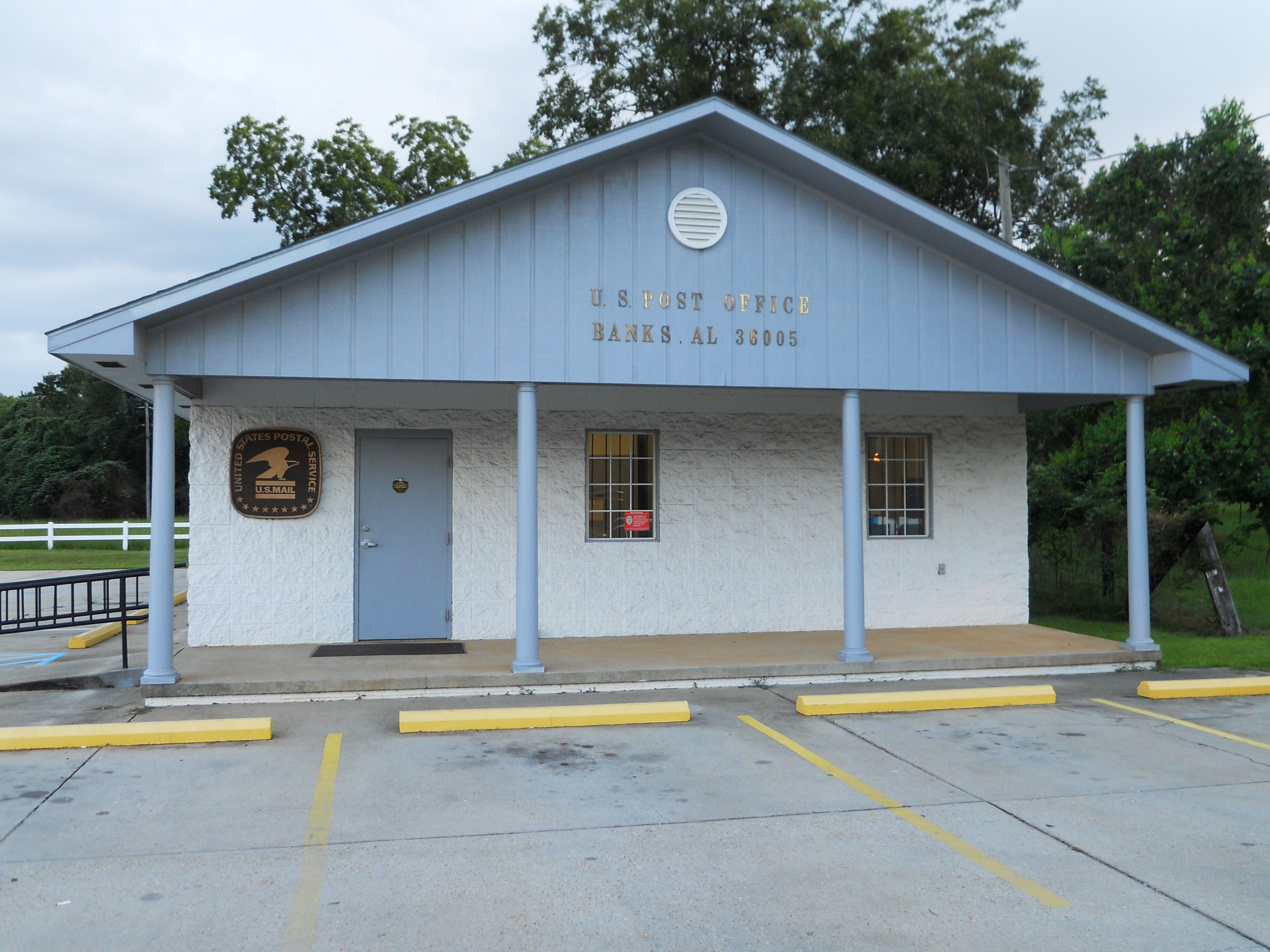
Banks Post Office (ZIP Code:36005)

The Deleon Post Office was closed at the end of September 1904 and moved to Banks.

According to the U.S. Census Bureau, the town has a total area of 2.0 square miles (5.2 km^{2}), all land.

== Demographics ==
Historical population
| Census | Pop. | Note | %± |
|---|---|---|---|
| 1900 | 198 | | — |
| 1910 | 307 | | 55.1% |
| 1920 | 299 | | −2.6% |
| 1930 | 296 | | −1.0% |
| 1940 | 252 | | −14.9% |
| 1950 | 222 | | −11.9% |
| 1960 | 201 | | −9.5% |
| 1970 | 170 | | −15.4% |
| 1980 | 160 | | −5.9% |
| 1990 | 195 | | 21.9% |
| 2000 | 224 | | 14.9% |
| 2010 | 179 | | −20.1% |
| 2020 | 156 | | −12.8% |
U.S. Decennial Census; 2013 Estimate

=== 2010 Census data ===
As of the 2010 Census Banks had a population of 179. The racial and ethic composition of the population was 69.3% white, 24.6% black or African American, 2.2% Native American, 1.1% from some other race, 2.8% reporting two or more races and 1.1% Hispanic or Latino from any race.

=== 2000 Census data ===
As of the census of 2000, there were 224 people, 92 households, and 62 families residing in the town. The population density was 111.3 inhabitants per square mile (43.0/km^{2}). There were 102 housing units at an average density of 50.7 per square mile (19.6/km^{2}). The racial makeup of the town was 84.82% White, 10.27% Black or African American, 1.79% Native American, 0.89% from other races, and 2.23% from two or more races. 0.89% of the population were Hispanic or Latino of any race.

There were 92 households, out of which 29.3% had children under the age of 18 living with them, 53.3% were married couples living together, 12.0% had a female householder with no husband present, and 32.6% were non-families. 29.3% of all households were made up of individuals, and 15.2% had someone living alone who was 65 years of age or older. The average household size was 2.43 and the average family size was 3.02.

In the town, the population dispersal was 25.4% under the age of 18, 9.4% from 18 to 24, 28.6% from 25 to 44, 20.1% from 45 to 64, and 16.5% who were 65 years of age or older. The median age was 38 years. For every 100 females, there were 94.8 males. For every 100 females age 18 and over, there were 92.0 males.

The median income for a household in the town was $21,719, and the median income for a family was $32,500. Males had a median income of $25,417 versus $26,500 for females. The per capita income for the town was $15,601. About 4.8% of families and 10.0% of the population were below the poverty line, including 10.9% of those under the age of eighteen and 11.3% of those 65 or over.

== Education ==
Banks Public Schools are part of the Pike County Schools. Schools in the district include Goshen Elementary School, Pike County Elementary School, Banks Middle School, Goshen High School, Pike County High School and the Troy-Pike Center for Technology.

Banks Middle School is located in Banks.

Dr. Mark Bazzell is the Superintendent of Schools.

== Notable person ==
- Audrey Williams, wife of Hank Williams and mother of Hank Williams, Jr. was from Banks.
- William Bartley Crawley , member of the Board of Directors of the Commodity Credit Corporation, 1950.
