= List of U.S. Highways in Alabama =

- Highway markers for US 31 and US 431

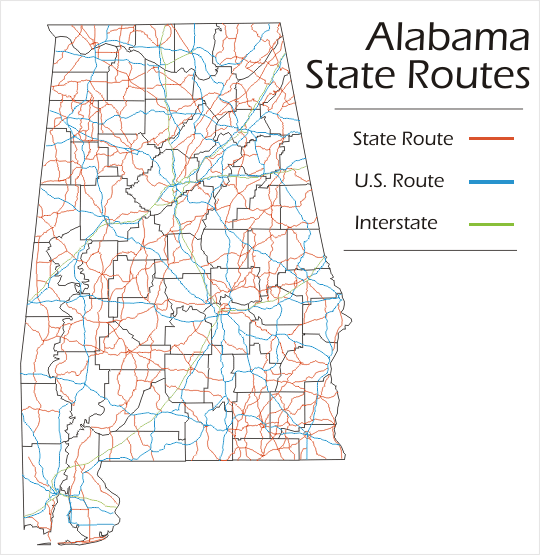
- Map of Alabama State Route System; U.S. Routes

Highway names
- Interstates: Interstate nn (I-nn)
- US Highways: U.S. Route nn (US nn)
- State: State Route nn (SR nn)

System links
- Alabama State Highway System; Interstate; US; State

The U.S. Highways in Alabama are the subset of the United States Numbered Highway System. These highways in the U.S. state of Alabama are maintained by the Alabama Department of Transportation (ALDOT). There are 19 U.S. Highways that travels through Alabama, totaling 3,852.85 miles (6,200.56 km). U.S. Route 31 (US 31) is the highway with the longest segment in Alabama, with 386.449 miles (621.929 km). The shortest is US 72 Alternate, crossing 68.3 miles (109.9 km) of North Alabama. One former U.S. Highway existed in Alabama: US 241. It traveled through the eastern part of the state. US 241 was replaced by US 280 and US 431 in 1954.

== List ==
Number	Length (mi)	Length (km)	Southern or western terminus	Northern or eastern terminus	Formed	Removed	Notes
US 11	250.671	403.416	US 11/US 80 at the Mississippi state line near Cuba	US 11 at the Georgia state line near Sulphur Springs	1926	current	
US 29	226.550	364.597	US 29 at the Florida state line near Flomaton	US 29/SR 14 at the Georgia state line near Lanett	1926	current	
US 31	386.449	621.929	US 90 in Spanish Fort	I-65/US 31 at the Tennessee state line near Ardmore	1926	current	
US 43	350.978	564.844	US 90 in Prichard	US 43 at the Tennessee state line near Green Hill	1934	current	
US 45	59.181	95.243	US 98 in Mobile	US 45 at the Mississippi state line near Yellow Pine	1926	current	
US 72	167.211	269.100	US 72 at the Mississippi state line near Lime Kiln	US 72 at the Tennessee state line near Bridgeport	1926	current	
US 78	192.192	309.303	US 78 at the Mississippi state line near Bexar	US 78/SR 8 at the Georgia state line near Muscadine	1926	current	
US 78N	18	29	US 78 and US 78S in Heflin	US 78N at the Georgia state line	1926	1933	
US 78S	23	37	US 78 and US 78N in Heflin	US 78S at the Georgia state line	1926	1933	
US 80	218.621	351.836	US 11/US 80 at Mississippi state line near Cuba	US 80/SR 22 at the Chattahoochee River/Georgia state line in Phenix City	1926	current	
US 82	239.895	386.074	US 82 at the Mississippi state line near Stafford	US 82/SR 50 at the Chattahoochee River/Georgia state line in Eufaula	1934	current	
US 84	231.682	372.856	US 84 at the Mississippi state line near Isney	US 84/SR 38 at the Chattahoochee River/Georgia state line near Alaga	1926	current	
US 90	77.031	123.969	US 90 at the Mississippi state line near Grand Bay	US 90 at the Perdido River/Florida state line near Seminole	1926	current	
US 98	80.248	129.147	US 98 at the Mississippi state line near Wilmer	US 98 at the Perdido River/Florida state line near Lillian	1955	current	
US 231	331	533	US 231 at the Florida state line near State Line	US 231/US 431 at the Tennessee state line near Fisk	1926	current	
US 241	359	578	US 84/SR 52 in Dothan, Alabama	US 241 at the Tennessee state line near Fisk	1930	1954	
US 278	199.162	320.520	US 278 at the Mississippi state line near Sulligent	US 278/SR 6 at the Georgia state line near Palestine	1951	current	
US 280	141.256	227.329	I-20/I-59/US 31 in Birmingham	US 280/SR 520 at the Chattahoochee River/Georgia state line in Phenix City	1953	current	
US 331	103	166	US 331 at the Florida state line in Florala	US 80/US 82 in Montgomery	1952	current	
US 411	87.6	141.0	US 78 in Leeds	US 411/SR 53 at the Georgia state line near Forney	1934	current	
US 431	341.824	550.112	US 231 in Dothan	US 231/US 431 at the Tennessee state line near Fisk	1953	current	
Former

== Special routes ==
Number	Length (mi)	Length (km)	Southern or western terminus	Northern or eastern terminus	Formed	Removed	Notes
US 11 Byp.	—	—	—	—	—	—	Served Tuscaloosa
US 11 Truck	—	—	—	—	—	—	Serves Birmingham
US 29 Truck	—	—	—	—	—	—	Serves Union Springs
US 31 Bus.	—	—	—	—	—	—	Served Montgomery
City US 31	—	—	—	—	—	—	Served Montgomery
US 31 Truck	—	—	—	—	—	—	Served Montgomery
US 43 Alt.	—	—	Mobile	Chickasaw	—	—	
US 43 Bus.	—	—	—	—	—	—	Served Tuscumbia
US 72 Bus.	—	—	—	—	—	—	Served Tuscumbia
US 72 Alt.	68.3	109.9	US 72 south of Muscle Shoals	I-565/US 72 in Huntsville	—	—	
US 72 Bus.	—	—	—	—	—	—	Serves Athens
US 72 Bus.	—	—	—	—	—	—	Serves Scottsboro
US 78 Alt.	—	—	Hamilton	Graysville	—	—	
US 78 Alt.	—	—	Carbon Hill	Jasper	—	—	
US 78 Alt.	—	—	Birmingham	Irondale	—	—	
US 78 Bus.	—	—	—	—	—	—	Served Anniston
US 78 Alt.	—	—	Heflin	Alabama-Georgia state line	—	—	
US 80 Bus.	—	—	—	—	—	—	Serves Selma
US 80 Truck	—	—	—	—	—	—	Serves Selma
US 80 Bus.	—	—	—	—	—	—	Served Montgomery
US 82 Byp.	—	—	—	—	—	—	Served Tuscaloosa
US 82 Alt.	—	—	Montgomery	Prattville	—	—	
US 82 Bus.	—	—	—	—	—	—	Served Montgomery
US 82 Byp.	—	—	—	—	—	—	Served Montgomery
US 82 Byp.	—	—	—	—	—	—	Served Montgomery
City US 82	—	—	—	—	—	—	Served Montgomery
US 82 Truck	—	—	—	—	—	—	Served Montgomery
US 84 Bus.	—	—	—	—	—	—	Serves Enterprise
US 84 Truck	—	—	—	—	—	—	Serves Enterprise
US 84 Bus.	—	—	—	—	—	—	Serves Dothan
US 90 Alt.	—	—	Prichard	Mobile	—	—	
US 90 Truck	—	—	—	—	—	—	Serves Mobile
US 98 Truck	—	—	—	—	—	—	Serves Mobile
US 98 Truck	—	—	—	—	—	—	Served Spanish Fort
US 98 Alt.	—	—	Fairhope	Barnwell	—	—	
US 231 Bus.	—	—	—	—	—	—	Serves Dothan
US 231 Bus.	—	—	—	—	—	—	Serves Ozark
US 231 Bus.	—	—	—	—	—	—	Served Montgomery
US 231 Alt.	—	—	Sylacauga	Pell City	—	—	
US 231 Bus.	—	—	—	—	—	—	Served Huntsville
US 278 Bus.	—	—	—	—	—	—	Served Piedmont
US 331 Alt.	—	—	Onycha	Opp	—	—	
US 411 Alt.	—	—	Centre	Alabama-Georgia state line	—	—	
US 411 Bus.	—	—	—	—	—	—	Serves Centre
Temp. US 411	—	—	Centre	Alabama-Georgia state line	—	—	
US 431 Bus.	—	—	—	—	—	—	Serves Dothan
US 431 Byp.	—	—	—	—	—	—	Served Phenix City
US 431 Bus.	—	—	—	—	—	—	Served Anniston
US 431 Byp.	—	—	—	—	—	—	Serves Gadsden
