= U.S. Route 80 in Alabama =

U.S. Highway in Alabama

U.S. Route 80
- Dixie Overland Highway
- US 80 highlighted in red

Route information
- Maintained by ALDOT
- Length: 218.621 mi (351.836 km) The total length of US 80 in Alabama and the total length of SR 8 are not the same.
- Existed: November 11, 1926–present
- Tourist routes: Selma To Montgomery March Byway; Selma To Montgomery National Historic Trail

Major junctions
- West end: US 80 / US 11 at the Mississippi state line in Cuba
- US 11 in Cuba; US 43 in Demopolis; US 31 in Montgomery; I-65 in Montgomery; I-65 / US 82 in Montgomery; US 331 in Montgomery; US 82 / US 231 in Montgomery; I-85 in Montgomery; US 29 from Tuskegee to Alliance; US 280 / US 431 in Phenix City
- East end: US 80 / SR 22 / SR 540 at the Georgia state line in Phenix City

Location
- Country: United States
- State: Alabama
- Counties: Sumter, Marengo, Hale, Perry, Dallas, Lowndes, Montgomery, Macon, Lee, Russell

Highway system
- United States Numbered Highway System; List; Special; Divided; Alabama State Highway System; Interstate; US; State
← SR 79	→ SR 81
← SR 7	SR 8	→ SR 9

U.S. Route 80 (US 80) is a major U.S. Highway in the American state of Alabama. The Alabama Department of Transportation internally designates the majority of US 80 throughout the state as State Route 8 (SR 8), save for parts of the route throughout Selma and near the Mississippi border. Serving as the main east to west highway through Alabama's Black Belt region, US 80 became well known as the main route for the 1965 Selma to Montgomery marches; it was the route along which the Civil Rights demonstrators walked, from Selma to Montgomery, and the Edmund Pettus Bridge in Selma was the site of Bloody Sunday. The highway was also once a major transcontinental highway (the Dixie Overland Highway) reaching from Tybee Island, Georgia, to San Diego, California, but has since been truncated to Dallas, Texas because it was largely replaced by the Interstate Highway System.

== Route description ==
State Route 8
- Location: Cuba, Alabama−Columbus, Georgia
- Length: 217.887 mi (350.655 km)
- Existed: 1928–present

U.S. Route 80 (US 80) through Alabama is roughly 218.621 miles (351.836 km) long. The entirety of US 80 through Alabama is called the Dixie Overland Highway. The route also makes up the entirety or components of several byways and scenic trails, including the Black Belt Nature and Heritage Trail, the Selma to Montgomery March National Historic Trail and the Selma to Montgomery March Byway, an All-American Road under the National Scenic Byways program. US 80 also serves as the main route through Alabama's Black Belt region, named after the dark colored soil often used for farming and irrigation. Demopolis, Selma, Montgomery and Tuskegee are the four largest cities on the highway.

=== Mississippi to Selma ===
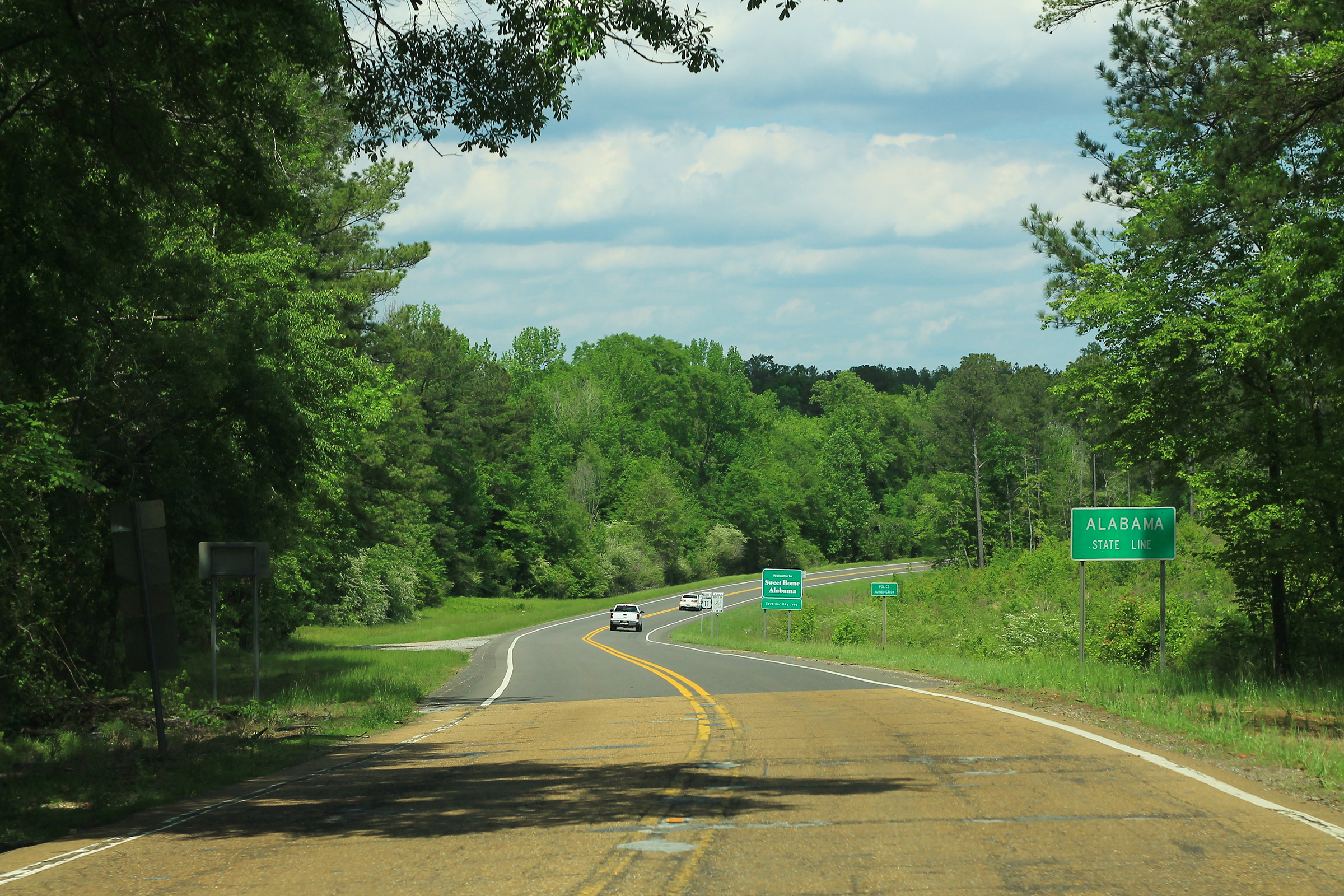
US 11 and US 80 at the Alabama state line.

US 80 and US 11 cross the Mississippi-Alabama state line east of Toomsuba, Mississippi, sharing a concurrency starting in Meridian, Mississippi. The two U.S. Highways are joined by a hidden Alabama State Route 7 designation starting at the state line. Heading northeast, the route passes through the town of Cuba and intersections with Sumter County Routes 76 and 10. CR 10 shares a small concurrency with US 11/US 80 through Cuba. On the northern end of town, US 11 and US 80 meet at a junction with a four lane divided highway starting at Interstate 20 and Interstate 59 to the west. Though unsigned west of the junction, the route is part of SR 8, which is the hidden state route US 80 shares most of its routing through Alabama with. US 80 turns east onto SR 8, ending the concurrency with US 11.

Heading east, US 80 passes over a grade separated interchange with SR 17. The highway passes a junction with CR 13, the hamlet of Bellamy and CR 21 before reaching an intersection with SR 28 and CR 25. US 80, now multiplexed with SR 28, continues east across the Rooster Bridge over the Tombigbee River into Marengo County. Next to Moscow Church, SR 28 leaves US 80 heading southeast to Linden. Continuing east past CR 57 and CR 28, US 80 arrives in Demopolis at a junction with US 43 (SR 13). For a few blocks, US 80 and US 43 run concurrent, past Jefferson Road (CR 21). At the intersection with Pettus Street, US 43 goes southeast towards Linden while US 80 continues eastward past CR 2 and CR 77 into Hale County. US 80 curves around Prairieville, intersecting with CR 12 and SR 69. US 80 and SR 69 run concurrent for less than a mile, before SR 69 heads north through Prairieville. After passing Prairieville, US 80 re-enters Marengo County. Directly north of Faunsdale, the highway crosses an intersection with SR 25 before leaving Marengo County for a final time, entering Perry County.

Upon crossing the Perry county line, US 80 enters Uniontown, reducing to two lanes in width. Through town, US 80 is known as Washington Street. First intersecting with CR 53 at West Avenue, US 80 meets with the southern terminus of SR 61 at Water Street, then the southern terminus of SR 183 and the northern terminus of CR 1 at East Street. A short distance east of the city limits, US 80 returns to being a four lane divided highway. After spending less than 10 miles (16 km) in Perry County, US 80 enters Dallas County, passing CR 177 and CR 23 at Bellevue before meeting with SR 5 at an interchange in Browns. Continuing east passing CR 178, CR 179, CR 178 a second time, CR 3 in Massillon and CR 349, US 80 meets CR 25 and CR 29 in Marion Junction. East of Marion Junction, US 80 meets with CR 45 in Harrell and CR 29 near New Morning Star Church. Entering the outskirts of Selma, a large number of minor county routes intersect with US 80; with CR 44 and CR 27 (Westwood Drive) being the last major county route intersections before entering the city limits. CR 44 along with Cahaba Road and J.L. Chestnut Junior Boulevard provide an alternate route into downtown Selma.

East of the junction with SR 219, US 80 meets SR 14 at a "Y" intersection. The two routes are co-signed down Highland Avenue through the northern part of Selma. At the intersection with SR 22 at Broad Street, SR 8 temporarily leaves US 80 following US 80 Business through downtown Selma, then across the Edmund Pettus Bridge. The intersection also marks the western terminus of US 80 Truck. Mainline US 80 and US 80 Truck remain entirely concurrent along the Selma bypass route. East of the intersection with CR 65 at Marie Foster Street, US 80 and US 80 Truck turn south at the northern terminus of SR 41, heading south, then southwest around downtown Selma. The bypass has four major intersections, two of which are freeway grade interchanges with Race Street and Water Street (CR 48). The junctions with SR 140 and CR 56 are both at grade intersections. Immediately south of downtown Selma, US 80, US 80 Truck and SR 41 meet up with US 80 Bus. and SR 8 at a signalized intersection. Despite conflicting signage on the bypass route, US 80 Truck terminates at the intersection, as does US 80 Bus. US 80 and SR 8 continue head southeast towards Lowndes County, while SR 41 continues south towards Camden.

=== Selma to Montgomery ===
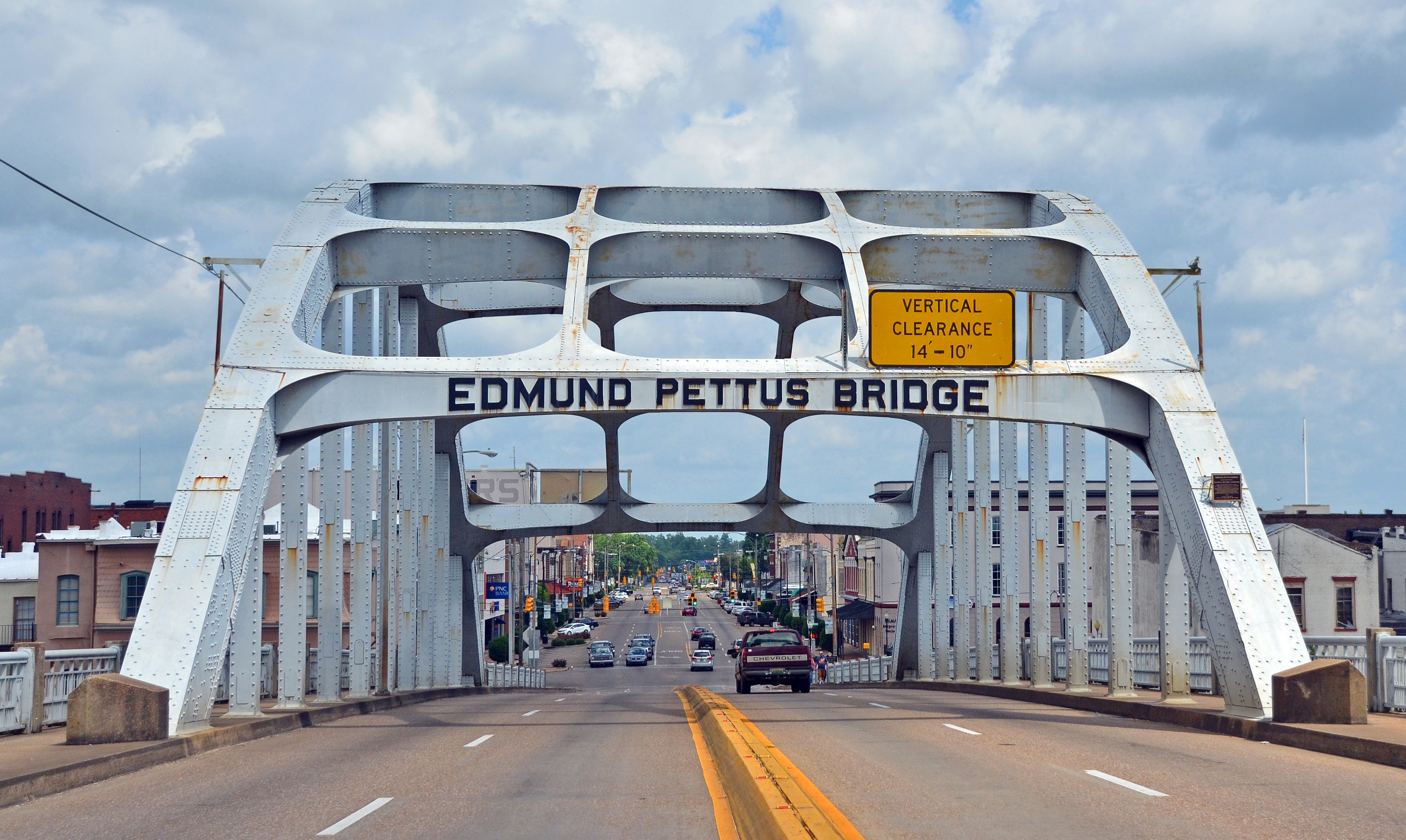
The Edmund Pettus Bridge in Selma.

US 80 made up the majority of roadway used in the 1965 Selma to Montgomery marches. The Selma to Montgomery March Byway starts at the First Baptist Church on the corner of Martin Luther King Junior Street and Jefferson Davis Avenue. The byway continues south until reaching Alabama Avenue near the Old Depot Museum then proceeds west on Alabama Avenue to US 80 Bus. at Broad Street. The Byway goes south across the Edmund Pettus Bridge and follows US 80 Bus. past the National Voting Rights Museum, then south to the intersection with US 80, US 80 Truck and SR 41. Between the eastern terminus of US 80 Bus. and Montgomery, the Byway follows US 80. The spot of the first campsite on the marching route is in the nearby suburb of Casey on the south side of US 80. Following junctions with CR 67, CR 69, CR 43, CR 7 and CR 19, the Byway continues east into Lowndes County. Going through Benton, US 80 passes the western terminus of CR 40, the Lowndes Interpretive Center located between CR 17 and CR 23, the Holy Ground Battlefield and the second campsite of the march. All three sites are located within the city limits of White Hall. Further to the east, adjacent to the Wright Chapel AME Zion Church, lies a memorial to Viola Liuzzo, a mother from Detroit, Michigan killed along US 80 by the Ku Klux Klan for her involvement in the 1965 marches.

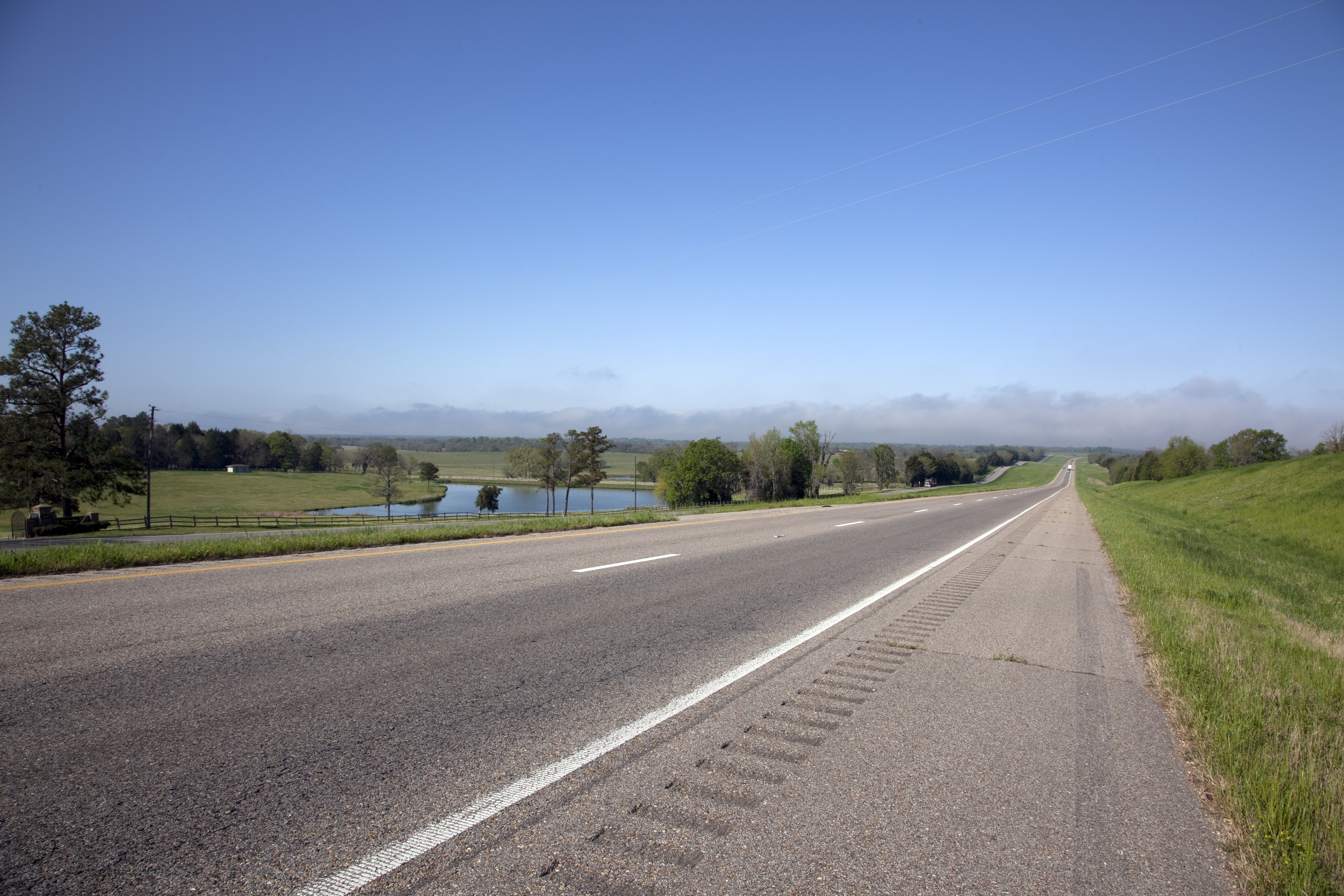
US 80 through Lowndes County.

US 80 then heads east through the southern edge of Lowndesboro and a shared junction with SR 97/CR 29. The Byway makes a curve to the northeast at the intersection with SR 21. Both US 80 and SR 21 run concurrently starting at this point. The Byway shares a short concurrency with CR 37 before crossing Pintlala Creek into Montgomery County. US 80/SR 21 intersects with CR 7 in Mount Sinai, also home to the final march campsite. At the current intersection with CR 403 is the proposed site for the interchange with SR 108 (Future I-85), also known as the Outer Loop Freeway. After the intersection with CR 17, the Byway enters Montgomery proper, intersecting with CR 103 and CR 15, before becoming a short one mile long freeway with an interchange at US 31. SR 21 and the Byway leave US 80 and head north concurrent with US 31. At South Boulevard, US 31 heads northwest, while SR 21 heads east. The Byway continues north on Mobile Highway, then curves right onto Fairview Avenue. It heads north on Oak Street just before I-65, then east on Jefferson Davis Avenue under I-65, going north on Holt Street. At Day Street (which eventually becomes I-85), it heads east for one block to Mobile Street, then goes northeast on Mobile, Goldthwaite and Montgomery Streets. In downtown Montgomery, the Byway makes a short jog down Court Street to head east on Dexter Avenue, passing the Civil Rights Memorial and ending at the Alabama State Capitol building. US 80 however, continues east one mile from US 31 to I-65. At a flyover interchange, US 80 overlaps I-65 north for one mile, before leaving the Interstate onto South Boulevard.

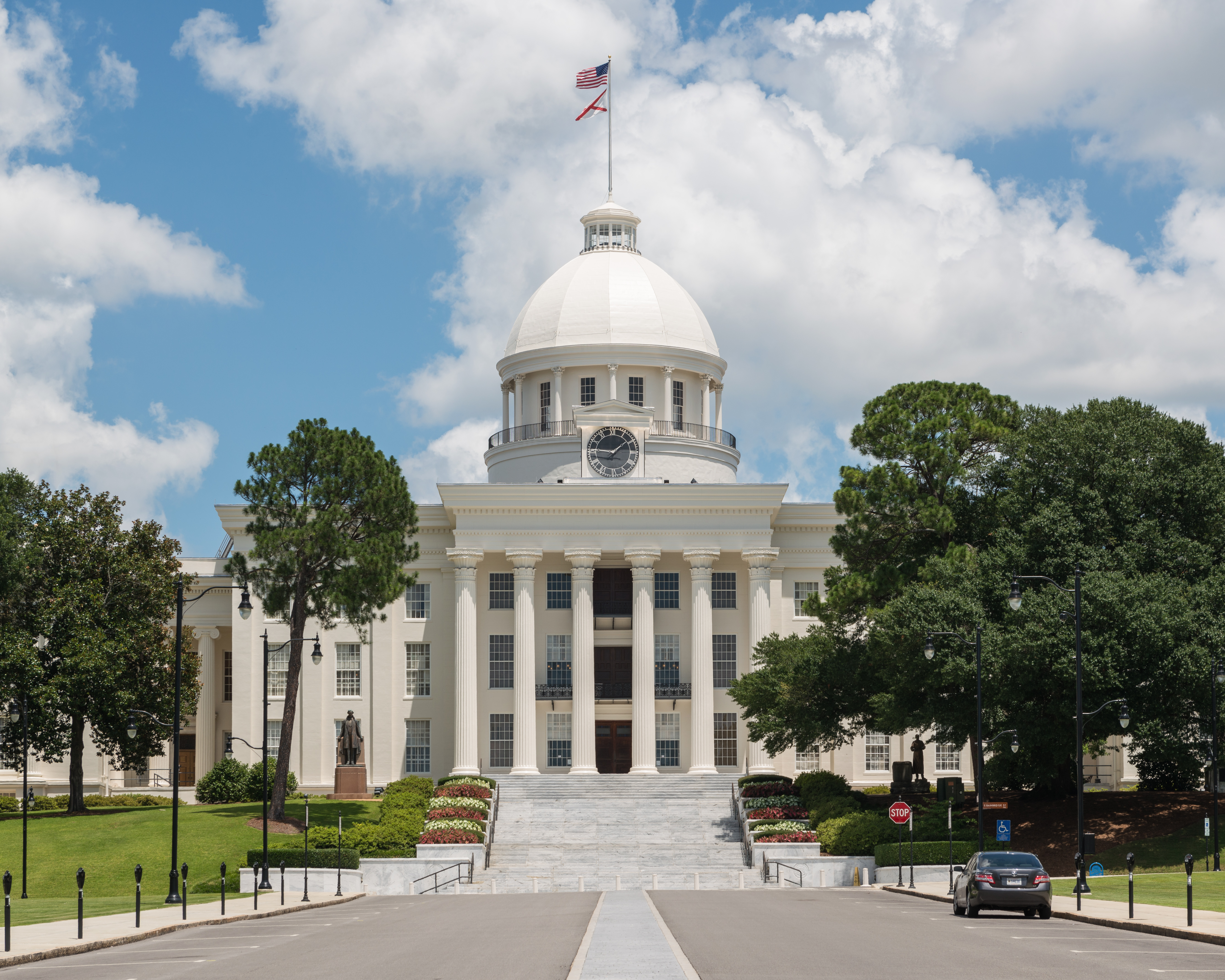
The Alabama State Capitol on Bainbridge Street and Dexter Avenue marks the end of the 1965 marching route.

On South Boulevard, US 80 picks up a concurrency with US 82 (SR 6) and SR 21 again, heading east. US 331 and SR 9, a hidden state route designation, head north on Court Street to end at US 80/US 82/SR 21. Though the intersection of South and Court is the northern terminus of US 331, the SR 9 designation begins a concurrency with US 80 and US 82 heading east. At the intersection of Troy Highway, US 82 heads southeast away from Montgomery while US 231 (SR 53) comes in from the southeast on the same highway. Now concurrent with US 231, the concurrent highways curve to the northeast towards I-85. US 80 leaves US 231, SR 21 and hidden SR 9 at the interchange with I-85 Exit 6.

=== Montgomery to Georgia ===
Leaving Montgomery, US 80 is concurrent with I-85. There are interchanges at SR 271 and SR 126 as well as a flyover with a completed portion of the SR 108 Inner Loop Freeway. At Exit 16, US 80 leaves the Interstate, sharing a brief concurrency with SR 126 into Waugh, where SR 126 splits off heading west to Mount Meigs. This is the spot where US 80 picks up the route of the Old Federal Road. US 80 heads east passing CR 200 going into Macon County. US 80 has two junctions with CR 2 and CR 97 south of Tysonville before entering Shorter. After a junction with CR 28, US 80 has a junction with a section of Old Federal Road heading through the heart of Shorter, then reaches the southern terminus of SR 38, going east towards Tuskegee. There are intersections with CR 7 at Polecat Springs, CR 9 at Calebee, SR 85 and SR 13 at La Place, CR 29 east of La Place, CR 49 near Liverpool as well as CR 81, CR 18 and CR 67 right before entering the Tuskegee City limits. US 80 is known as Martin Luther king Highway after the late Reverend Martin Luther King Jr. On the west side of town, the highway serves as the southern terminus of CR 51 and northern terminus of CR 3. The intersections with Main Street, Westside Street and Fred Gray Street at the south end of the town square serves as the southern terminus of SR 81 as well as the western end of a concurrency with US 29 (SR 15), which comes in from the southeast on Main Street.

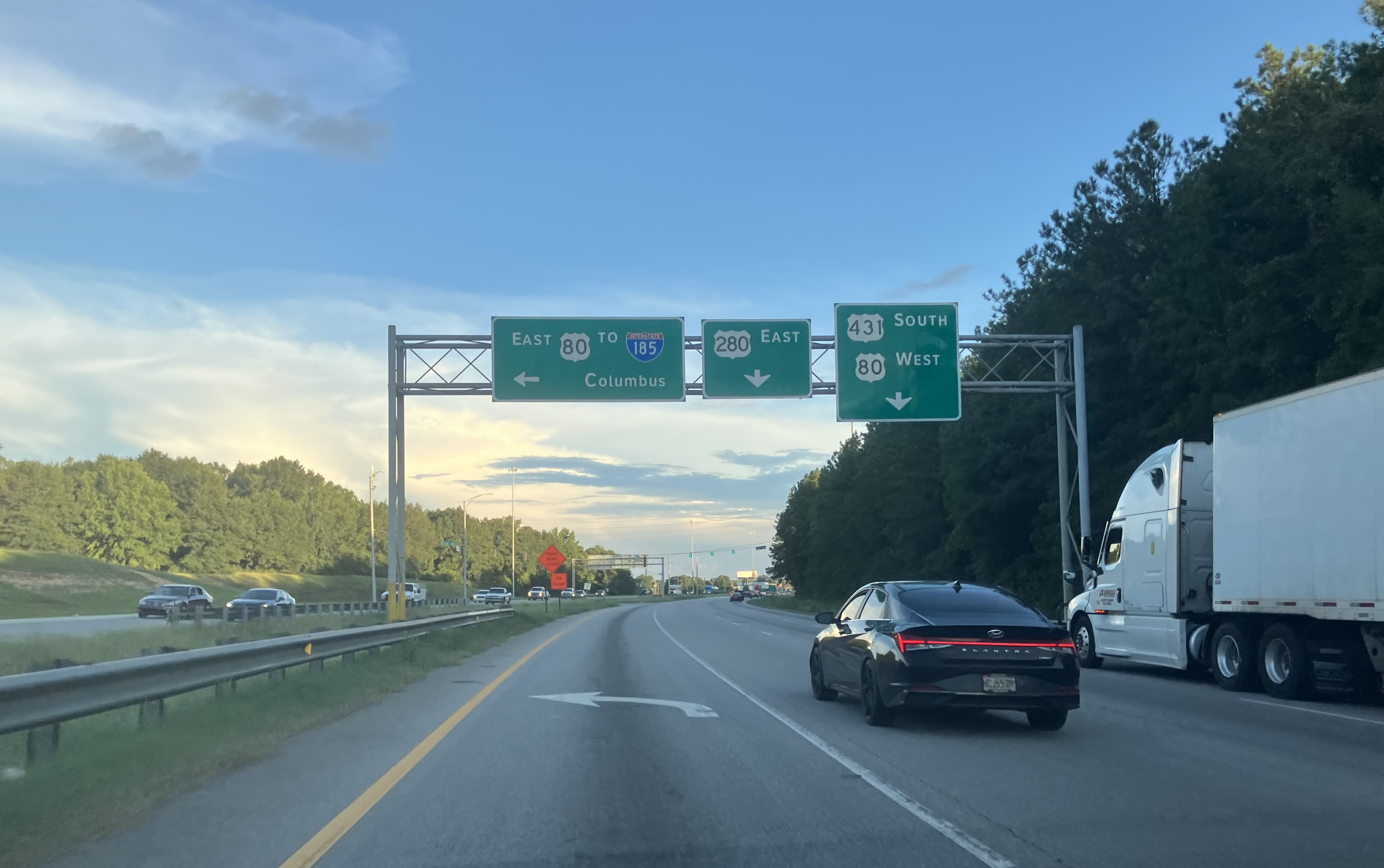
The concurrency of US 80, US 231, and US 280 in Phenix City

Both US 80 and US 29 head northeast out of Tuskegee, passing the southern terminus of CR 53 and the northern terminus of CR 63 near Pleasant Hill. Immediately after the northern terminus of CR 89, the two U.S. Highways reach an interchange at Alliance, serving as the eastern terminus of SR 186. US 29 continues northeast to Auburn, while US 80 goes southeast past CR 69, CR 24 and CR 22 before reaching a "Y" intersection with CR 26 at Society Hill. The intersection with CR 43 serves as the center of the small hamlet, before US 80 continues heading east into Lee County. US 80 travels a short distance of 6.05 miles (9.74 km) through the southernmost tip of Lee County. The first major intersection in is CR 029, followed by CR 011 and CR 034. US 80 intersects with SR 51 at a traffic signal in Marvyn. Going past CR 038, US 80 enters Russell County, the final county before reaching the Georgia state line. US 80 has several intersections with numbered county routes going east into Crawford. On the western end of town, at the intersection with SR 169 and CR 27, SR 169 forms a short concurrency with US 80 for eight blocks past CR 79 at Bleeker Road. SR 169 splits from US 80 on the east end of Crawford going southeast. Following an intersection with CR 94 and CR 35, the highway continues to Phenix City with no notable intersections until reaching the intersection with 14th Street and US 280 (SR 38)/US 431 (SR 1). US 80 turns to the north and overlaps both highways until reaching the western end of the J.R. Allen Parkway. Notably, US 80 and it's auxiliary route US 280 share a wrong-way concurrency along this stretch. US 80 turns east, becoming a four lane freeway. There are two interchanges on the Parkway in Alabama, at Summerville Road and Riverchase Drive. The junction between the Parkway and US 280/US 431 is an incomplete third interchange. US 80 crosses the Georgia state line at the western end of the Chattahoochee River bridge. This is the eastern end of the Alabama State Route 8 designation and western end of Georgia State Route 22/Georgia State Route 540. US 80, SR 22, and SR 540 continue east over the river on the J.R. Allen Parkway into Columbus, Georgia, and this marks the beginning of the Fall Line Freeway.

=== Old alignments ===
In its history as a designated highway through Alabama, the route of US 80 has gone through many changes. Prior to 1954, US 80 continued to follow US 11 northeast to Livingston, then southeast through Coatopa on present day SR 28 to modern US 80. Sumter County Route 25 and the road leading from SR 28 southwest to Mount Valley True Light Church on the Marengo County side of the river are the older routing of both US 80 and SR 28, once connected by the 1925 Rooster Bridge. Though the bridge itself was demolished in 1980, satellite images show the approach spans remain over both river banks, albeit only for short distances. In Praireville, Hale County Route 12 makes up part of an older two lane routing of US 80 through the small community.

US 80 passed through the center of Faunsdale in past years, the current highway bypasses the town altogether. Dallas County Route 29 and the eastern section of CR 44 make up the original alignment of US 80 between Marion Junction and Selma. Although the old steel highway bridge across the Cahaba River on CR 29 is still standing, it is currently closed to traffic, making that section of CR 29 impassible. The original alignment of US 80 took Washington Street and Old Montgomery Highway (CR 56) through the south side of Selma over an 1885 Wagon Road bridge. Though the bridge was torn down in 1940, a plaque stands at the current end of Washington Street in Lafayette Park, where the northern end of the bridge once was. The Bridge Keeper's house is still standing at the end of Washington Street as well. After 1940, the alignment of US 80 went over the Edmund Pettus Bridge; this alignment is currently Business US 80.

Originally, US 80 used Mobile Highway, Fairview Avenue, Perry Street, Dexter Avenue, Bainbridge Street, Madison Avenue and Atlanta Highway through Montgomery. By 1940, the highway traveled from Perry straight to Madison. Sections of present-day SR 126 are old curves and sections of US 80, especially the highway through Mount Meigs. Dallas County Route 22, also known as Glassy Mill Road, is another early segment of US 80, bypassed by the current route to Alliance. The pre-freeway route of US 80 through Phenix City took 14th Street through town, then went across the 14th Street Bridge. Following the old route exactly by highway is partially impossible as the 14th Street Bridge is now a pedestrian bridge.

== History ==
A large section of U.S. Route 80 (US 80) in Alabama traces the general path of the Old Federal Road, originally constructed in 1805. The first automobile route to be established along the current route of US 80 was the Dixie Overland Highway by the Automobile Club of Savannah in 1914, which ran from San Diego, California to Savannah, Georgia. US 80 itself was established largely along the same route as the Dixie Overland Highway on November 11, 1926, with the same eastern and western terminals as its predecessor. In Alabama, the highway is best known for its role in the Civil Rights Movement as the location of both the Bloody Sunday events at the Edmund Pettus Bridge and the Selma to Montgomery marches led by civil rights activist Martin Luther King Jr. Both events occurred in March 1965. As a result, US 80 between the two cities was later designated as the Selma to Montgomery National Historic Trail in an act passed by Congress in 1996. During the creation of the Interstate Highway System in the late 1950s, US 80 through Alabama was one of the few sections of the highway that would not be bypassed by the new system of nationwide freeways, save for small sections of I-65 and I-85 near Montgomery. However, large sections of US 80 have since been constructed into a four-lane divided highway.

=== Auto trail era ===
Much of present-day US 80 between Montgomery and the Georgia state line in Alabama follows the route of the Old Federal Road. Starting as a post road in 1805, the Old Federal Road was the first modern road across southern Alabama, then part of Mississippi Territory, connecting Fort Stoddert and Fort Mims to Montgomery and Fort Mitchell. The presence of the Old Federal Road also gave rise to many plantations, taverns, and post offices. The road became the site of many conflicts between the American Military and Native American tribes and would later be used as a means of deportation of Native Americans from southern Alabama. Through the 1830s and 1840s, the Old Federal Road would also be used as an immigration route for settlers entering Alabama and the American southeast. Much of the route would remain in use until the early to mid 1930s.

Dixie Overland Highway
- Location: Mississippi state line–Columbus, Georgia
- Existed: 1917–present

State Road 26
- Location: Mississippi state line−Columbus, Georgia
- Existed: 1924–1928

In July 1914, the Automobile Club of Savannah began planning a transcontinental auto trail to connect Savannah, Georgia to California. The Association managing the new auto trail was formed the same month, establishing the Dixie Overland Highway. By 1917, the highway had a set route from Arizona to Savannah through Alabama, following much of the Old Federal Road in both Alabama and Georgia. During a 1918 meeting of the Dixie Overland Highway Association, California politician Stanley Hufflund delivered a letter to the association on behalf of fellow politician Ed Fletcher, lobbying for the western terminus of the highway, then undecided, to be established in San Diego. Earlier lobbying and grass roots campaigns made by Fletcher had ensured the construction of a new state highway between San Diego and Yuma, Arizona, part of which was a 7 mile long plank road through previously impassible sand dunes. Although Fletcher was unable to attend, the Association gave serious consideration into the matter. In 1919, the Association agreed to make San Diego the Dixie Overland Highway's western terminus and elected Fletcher as president of the entire association. Through Alabama, the Dixie Overland Highway passed through Livingston, Selma, Montgomery and Tuskegee. By 1921, much of the Dixie Overland Highway had also attained the title of Jefferson Davis Highway, a name which sections of the highway in Alabama and Arizona retain to this day. By 1924, the entirety of the Dixie Overland Highway in Alabama had been designated as State Road 26 by the Alabama State Highway Department.

==== Rooster Bridge ====
Following finalization of the route, the Dixie Overland Highway Association faced a major obstacle: the lack of a highway bridge over the Tombigbee River between Sumter and Marengo counties in Alabama. Demopolis local Frank Derby came up with an idea to raise funding for construction of a bridge. A rooster auction would be held in Demopolis, which catered to cockfighting. At the time, cockfighting was still a legal hobby and had yet to be outlawed. Derby gained support of local public figures in order to host the auction. A U.S. Senator from Alabama, working with Derby, convinced President Woodrow Wilson, French Prime Minister Georges Clemenceau, Italian Prime Minister Vittorio Emanuele Orlando and British Prime Minister David Lloyd George to donate roosters. General John J. Pershing, Helen Keller, Roscoe Arbuckle and Mary Pickford donated hens and roosters as well. Derby had led a similar effort back in 1918 to auction off bulls at the benefit of the American Red Cross in Birmingham. The Rooster Auction attracted many visitors and hosted the largest barbecue in Alabama history. Despite having raised enough pledges for bridge construction funding, the money actually collected was not enough to build the structure. The state of Alabama and the federal government stepped in, funding the construction of the new bridge. Construction started in 1922 and the Memorial Bridge was opened on May 15, 1925. Locals however took to calling the new structure the Rooster Bridge after the auction. Due to state legislation passed in 1959, the highway bridge crossing the Tombigbee River near Demopolis is still called Rooster Bridge.

=== Early years of US 80 ===
Historical US 80 route markers

1926 design

1948 design

1961 design

1971 design

In 1925, multiple state highway departments across the United States lobbied the U.S Department of Agriculture to create a standardized national highway system to replace the auto trails. The Secretary of Agriculture appointed the Joint Board of Interstate Highways in April 1925, which was a cooperation between state highway departments and the Bureau of Public Roads, to develop a new system. Following several meetings with state highway officials across the country, the Joint Board settled on a numbering system with a standardized highway shield. This network of proposed designations would become the U.S. Highway System. Much of the Dixie Overland Highway between San Diego and Savannah received the proposed designation of U.S. Route 80. The Joint Board completed its proposal in October 1925, which the Secretary of Agriculture immediately submitted to the newly formed American Association of State Highway Officials (AASHO). On November 11, 1926 AASHO approved the new highway system officially designating US 80 as an active highway. Although the auto trail era has long passed, the Alabama segment of US 80 continues to use the Dixie Overland Highway name to this day. Upon designation of US 80 as an active highway, most of the route in the state of Alabama was still unpaved and other sections of road remained much as they were prior to adoption as a state highway. Only small sections of US 80 and SR 26 were paved in Demopolis, Selma and Montgomery respectively. By the fall of 1928, the state highway system in Alabama underwent a major highway renumbering. State Road 26 was re-designated State Route 8 between Mississippi and Phenix City, while the segment from the Mississippi state line through Cuba and Livingston was also designated as part of State Route 7. The section of highway between Tysonville and Tuskegee through Milstead was undergoing paving as was the route between Uniontown and Browns The route from Livingston to the Mississippi state line had already been paved. Much of the previously unimproved road was being improved with gravel or other secondary types of bituminous surfacing, leaving only a section between Tuskegee and Society Hill untouched by the State Highway Department. By 1929, a new section of US 80/SR 8 was constructed between Tuskegee and Tysonville bypassing the older route through Milstead. By 1930, paving was complete on US 80 between Uniontown and Browns.

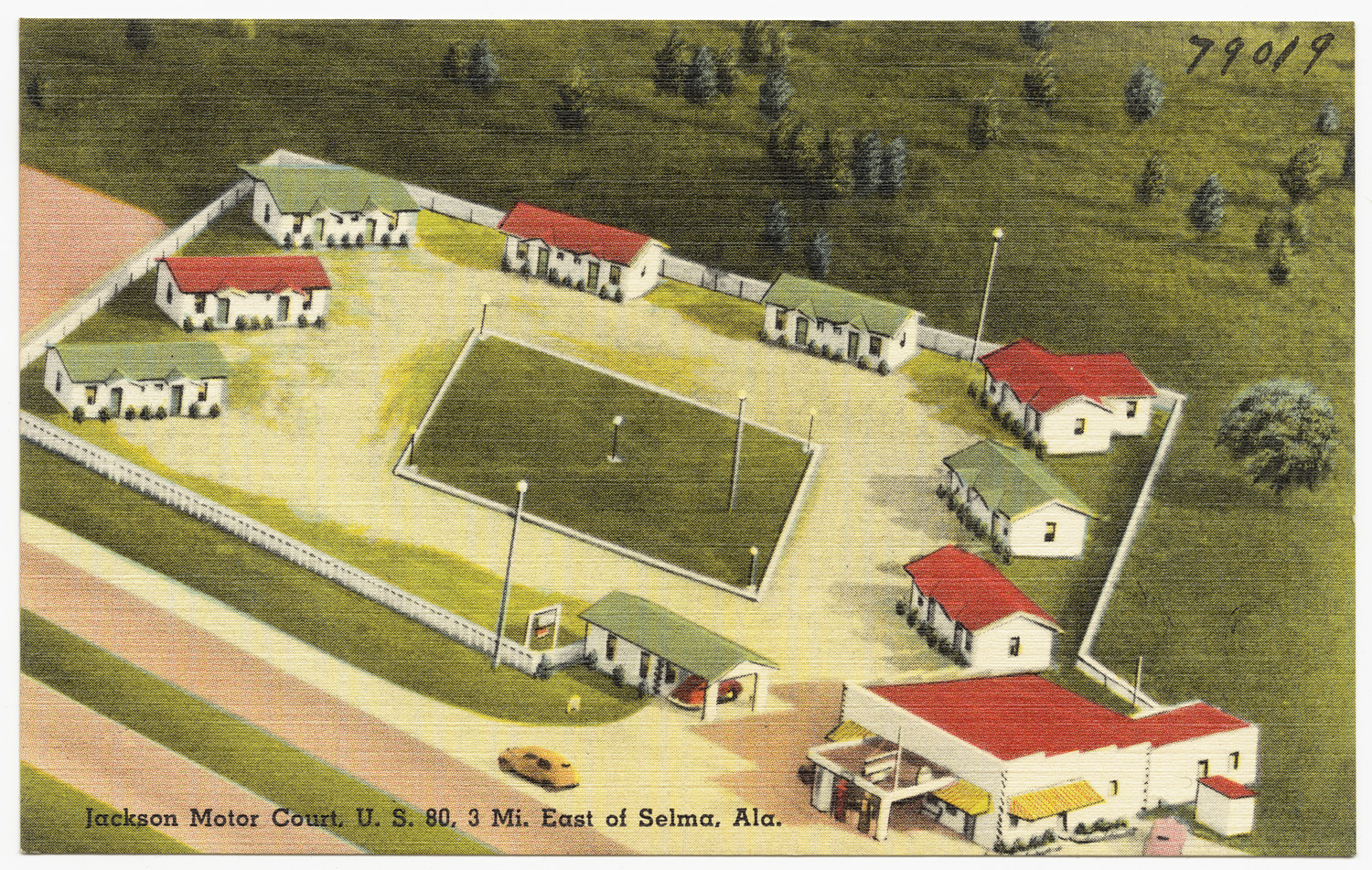
Post card of the Jackson Motor Court, a Motel on US 80 near Selma

By 1931, paving had commenced on the section of US 80 between Livingston and the Rooster Bridge. Paving was also completed on the highway from Montgomery to Tuskegee. A new less direct alignment of US 80 had been constructed between Tuskegee and Society Hill, bypassing the older unimproved route. Half of the new route was undergoing improvement at the time of opening. The total length of US 80 in Alabama that year averaged around 227 miles (365 kilometres). By 1933, paving was completed between Livingston and the Rooster Bridge. US 80 between Selma and Lowndes County was also fully paved. Further paving had been completed on US 80 from Lowndes County to Montgomery. The route from the Tuskegee Institute through Tysonville to Mount Meigs had also been bypassed by a more direct route through Shorter. The route through Shortleaf and Demopolis was bypassed by November 1934. The new route still passed through Demopolis, though around the south side of the city. US 43 was commissioned in Alabama along SR 40 and SR 13 to Mobile, sharing a short concurrency with US 80 and SR 8 through eastern Demopolis. By 1935, all of US 80 and SR 8 between Mississippi and Tuskegee was paved. The remainder of the highway to Georgia was still surfaced with gravel or sand. US 11 had been extended into Mississippi by 1936, sharing a concurrency with US 80 from Livingston to the Mississippi state line into Mississippi itself. A small section of US 80 between Phenix City and Georgia had also been paved. US 80 through Tuskegee had also been rerouted south of the Institute. In 1935, massive flooding on the Alabama River in Selma submerged the US 80 bridge under the surge, halting all traffic between Selma and Lowndes County. The bridge, built in 1885 was constructed without taking the maximum river flood height into account. Plans already in place for a large replacement steel and concrete bridge were expedited by the Alabama Highway Department. No major changes would be made to US 80 until 1940, when the route from Society Hill to Crawford was paved and the remainder of the highway between Phenix City and Tuskegee was also undergoing paving work. Finally in 1943, the entire highway had been paved from Mississippi to Georgia. The replacement bridge over the Alabama River in Selma was completed the same year and was officially named the Edmund Pettus Bridge after the Alabama statesman and American Civil War veteran Edmund W. Pettus. The 1885 bridge began demolition shortly after the Edmund Pettus Bridge opened. During the opening ceremony on May 24, 1940, Pettus' daughter in law cut the ribbon to officially open the bridge to traffic. Alabama governor Frank M. Dixon, attended the ceremony as well. In total, the construction of the Edmund Pettus Bridge cost $863,000 US.

=== Post-war changes ===
State Route 162
- Location: SR 17–Bellamy
- Length: 7.000 mi (11.265 km)
- Existed: 1948–1954

In 1947, a group of delegates from several towns along US 80 in the western United States had a meeting at the Pioneer Hotel in Tucson, Arizona, to discuss the future of US 80. Travel on the western segment of the highway had decreased dramatically since the end of the second World War. The delegates decided to form a new U.S. Highway 80 Association to promote the highway. Up until that point, the states of California, Arizona and New Mexico had promoted US 80 as the western extension of the Broadway of America, a transcontinental tourist highway ending in New York. The goal of the new association was to abandon the Broadway of America altogether and focus instead on promoting the entirety of US 80 between Savannah and San Diego as an all year scenic route. A secondary goal of the association was to make US 80 a formidable competitor to the famous US 66. In 1948, the newly formed western and central divisions of the new association, representing the highway from California to Texas, met with 75 representatives from Louisiana, Mississippi, Alabama and Georgia to form the eastern division of the association. Alabama officials representing Phenix City, Tuskegee, Montgomery, Selma and Demopolis were among the 75 persons to meet with the central and western US 80 delegates in Ruston, Louisiana to form the final part of the nascent association. The eastern division was formed and the association with its three divisions was formally organized in 1949. Though the eastern division was based in Ruston, Louisiana, it represented and promoted the highway through all four southern states US 80 passed through. The state of Alabama, Montgomery in particular, got heavily involved in promoting the highway for boosts in local tourism. Smaller US 80 statewide associations were founded to promote the highway in Alabama. In the coming decade, US 80 grew to become a very popular and heavily traveled highway. There even came a time when more people traveled into California on US 80 than on US 66. In 1955, US 80 and SR 8 underwent a major re-route, bypassing Coatopa, Livingston and York. Previously, only part of the new route had been in the state highway system as SR 162, between SR 17 and Bellamy. The old route between Cuba and Livingston remained part of US 11 while the section between Livingston and Moscow became SR 132. By 1958, large sections of US 80 between Selma and Montgomery, as well as a section immediately west of Tuskegee had been converted into a four lane divided highway.

=== Selma to Montgomery marches ===
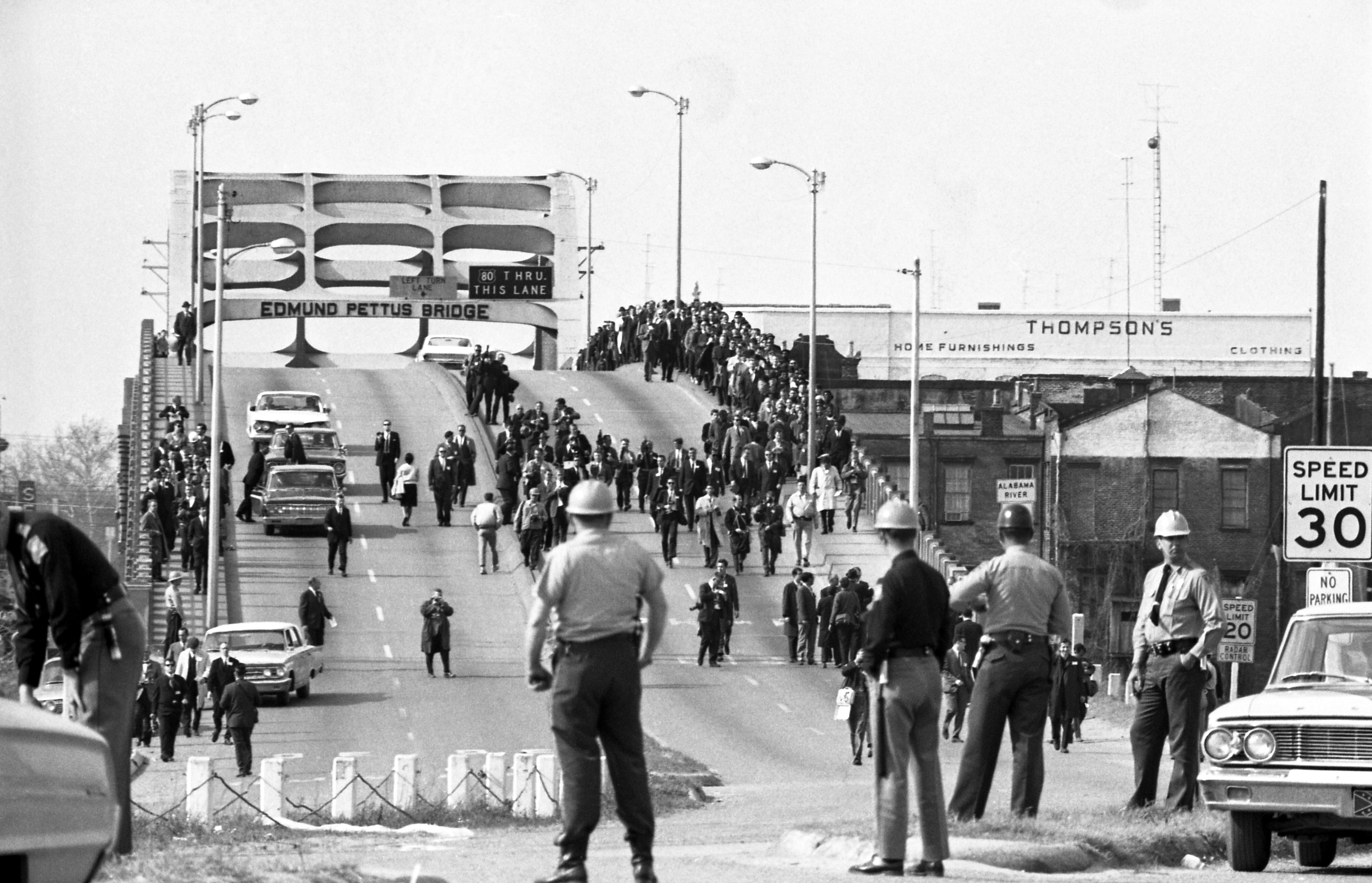
The Alabama National Guard and local law enforcement preparing to attack nonviolent civil rights demonstrators on the Edmund Pettus Bridge (US 80) on March 7, 1965.

The Alabama section of US 80 played an integral role in the events of the American Civil Rights Movement. Selma, like many cities and towns in the American southeast, was subject to Jim Crow laws, which enforced acts of racial segregation among the populace. Dating back to 1877, the Jim Crow laws were meant to separate the American black and white populations, while ensuring both had institutions and accommodations of equal quality – a notion commonly referred to as "separate but equal". In reality, the acts did little more than legally force the southeast's black population to reside in poor living conditions and also denied black citizens entry into most white establishments such as businesses and public institutions. Following the events surrounding the landmark ruling of the Supreme Court case of Brown v. Board of Education in 1954, desegregating American schools and the Montgomery bus boycott in 1955 and 1956 leading to a similar ruling regarding public bus segregation by the Supreme Court, marked the beginning of the Civil Rights Movement, meant to abolish American segregation. The movement lead to protests across the United States, including the March on Washington in 1963, where civil rights leader Martin Luther King Jr. delivered his famous "I Have a Dream" speech. Though the civil rights protests were often met with violent retaliation, the Civil Rights Act of 1964 ensured much of the goals the protesters and activists had pushed for became legal reality. However, remaining Jim Crow laws still prevented most black Americans in the southeast from voting. Initial efforts to surpass this problem during the Freedom Summer campaign in Mississippi was met with the murder of three activists involved in the project. Further retaliation by pro-segregationists, ranging from bombings to police brutality lead to an increase in protests against such violence as well as voting restrictions in the year 1965. In Dallas County, there were over 15,000 black citizens eligible for voter registration, but only 300 of those people were actually registered.

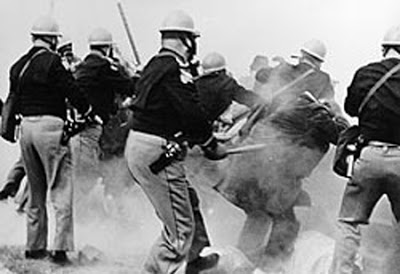
Resistance forces attacking the marchers.

Following earlier failed demonstrations in Selma and the death of Jimmie Lee Jackson in Marion, Martin Luther King Jr. began working with other activists to create a march from Selma to the state capitol in Montgomery. The march was to follow the route of US 80 between the two cities. Despite King's being unable to attend due to illness and preferring to postpone the event, the first attempt at the march started without him on March 7, 1965, with 525 individuals in attendance. The march continued east on US 80 until reaching the south side of the Edmund Pettus Bridge over the Alabama River. The Alabama National Guard, under orders of Governor George Wallace, awaited the protesters wearing gas masks and brandishing weapons. Joining the Guard were local policemen and "possemen", civilians authorized to combat the protesters by local law enforcement. The resistance proceeded to violently beat the protesters with batons and tear gas, while others trampled protesters with horses while also spitting and cracking bullwhips on the demonstrators. Over 50 participants had to be taken to the hospital. News agencies such as the American Broadcasting Company however, had recorded the event on television cameras, then proceeded to interrupt regular programming to display the footage nationwide. The event would come to be known as "Bloody Sunday". News of the attacks led to public outrage across the United States. King organized a second protest on March 9, with the support of nearly 400 new demonstrators from across the nation, despite a court-issued restraining order. This time, the resistance on the other end of the bridge cleared an open pathway on US 80 for the protesters to proceed rather than continue to block the highway. King, fearing the move was a trap, cancelled the march.

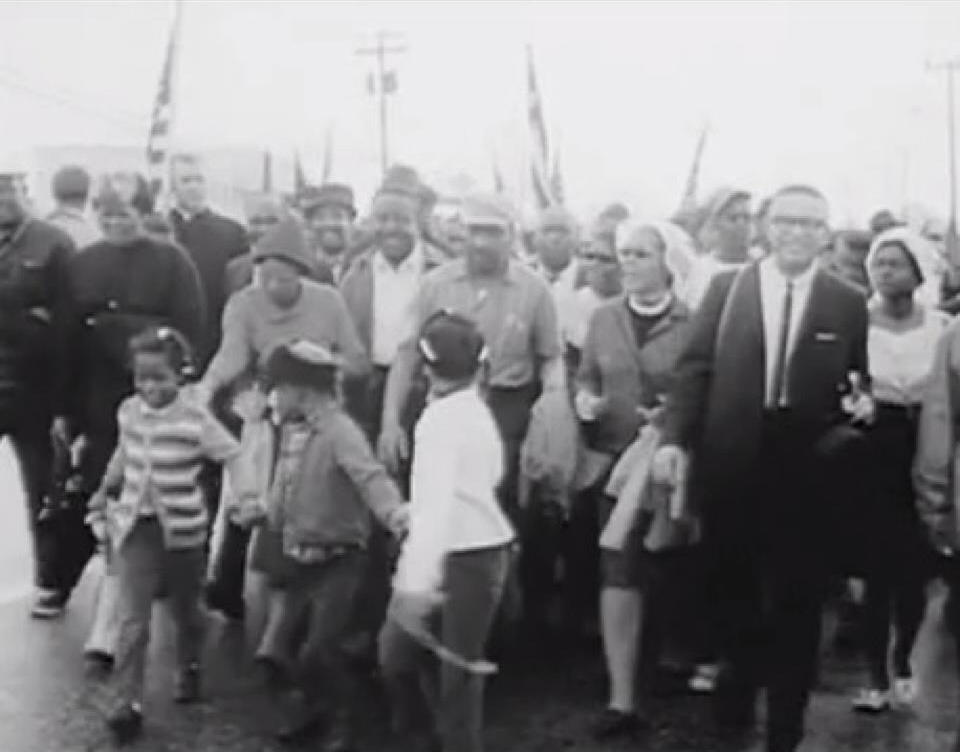
Demonstrators marching down US 80 in Montgomery on March 25, 1965.

Growing pressure and outrage caused President Lyndon Johnson to give a public address to Congress in support to the marchers. As well as the address, Johnson pressured Congress to pass legislation which would become the Voting Rights Act of 1965. This legislation abolished practices such as literacy tests, which had prevented the majority of black citizens in the southeast from voting. Though the legislation would not be passed until August 6. Judge Frank Minis Johnson overturned the earlier restraining order, ruling the protesters had every right to march along US 80 or any public under rights guaranteed by the First Amendment of the United States Constitution. A third attempt at the march led by King began on March 21, 1965, with almost 3,200 people attending. Along the march, demonstrators were met by widespread taunting including signs and posters directing verbal attacks towards the march as well as a radio store in Selma playing "Bye Bye Blackbird" towards the group. In Lowndes County, US 80 reduced from four lanes to two. Due to restrictions, the number of protesters through the county was greatly reduced to 300 persons. Despite the reduction, the march continued to push forward over the next four days. On March 25, the march reached the city limits of Montgomery. Upon entering the city, the number of demonstrators rose to 30,000 individuals. The marchers left US 80 and arrived at the state capitol on Dexter Street, where King gave his "How Long, Not Long" speech to a giant crowd on top of a flatbed trailer. President Johnson had arranged for the Alabama National Guard, United States Army, Federal Bureau of Investigation and the United States Marshals Service to protect the demonstrators from harm during the march along US 80.

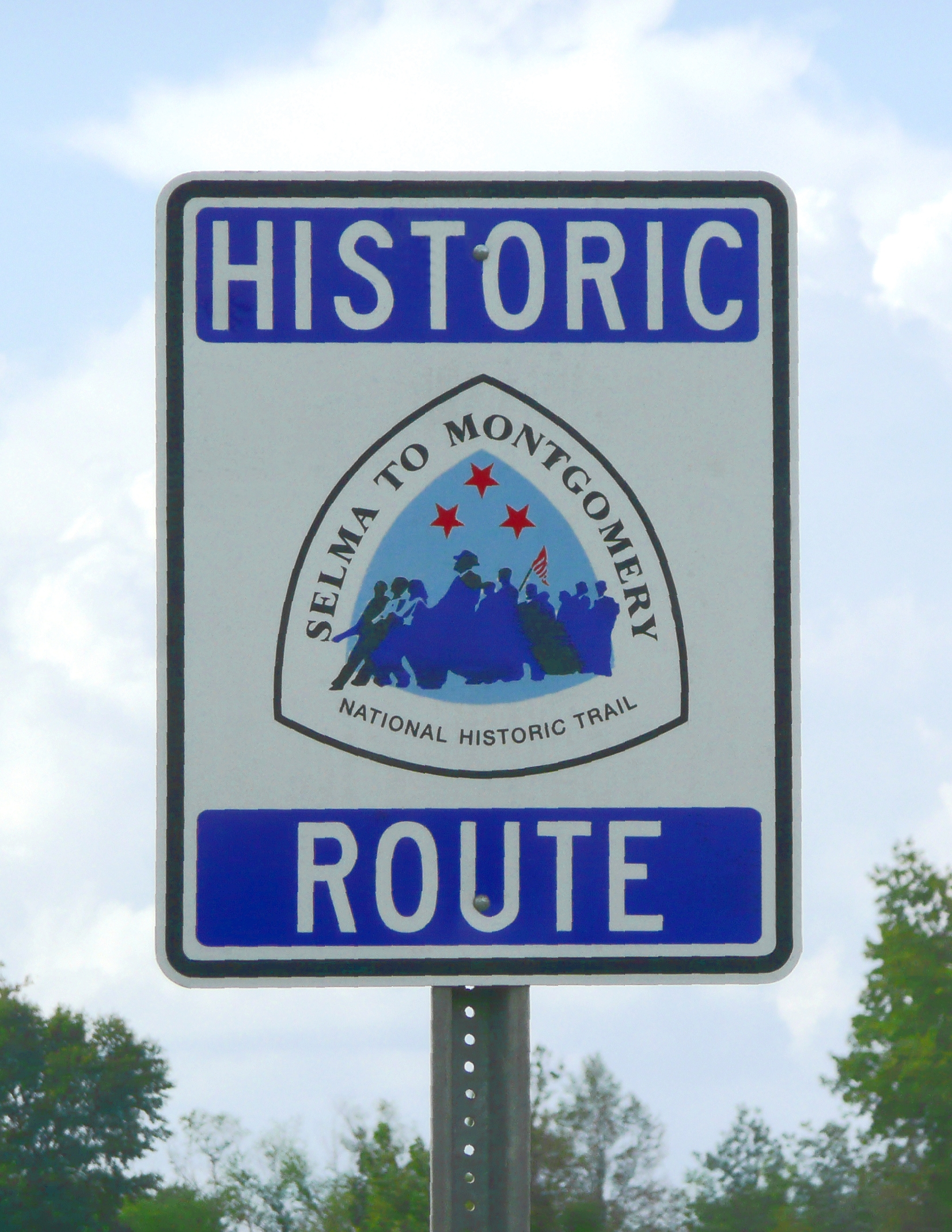
Official marker for the Selma to Montgomery National Historic Trail

In 1989, Representative John Lewis of Georgia, one of the marchers from the 1965 demonstrations, introduced the Selma to Montgomery National Trail Study Act, which enabled the National Park Service to study a potential designation of US 80 between Montgomery and Selma as a National Trail. The study was approved on July 3, 1990, signed into effect by President George H. W. Bush as Public Law 101-321. The National Park Service tasked historians Luke Lambert and Barbara Tagger to conduct the study. In April 1993, the study was completed and awaited Congressional approval. Congress approved of the designation, passing legislation to President Bill Clinton. President Clinton proceeded to sign Public Law 104-333 into effect on November 12, 1996, officially designating the 54-mile stretch of US 80 as the Selma to Montgomery National Historic Trail. The stretch of road had previously been designated as a National Scenic Byway by the Secretary of Transportation on September 19, 1996. President Clinton himself joined a commemorative march with King's widow, Coretta Scott King, and several other civil rights activists on the 35th anniversary of Bloody Sunday.

=== Interstate era ===
With the coming of the Interstate Highway System in 1957, US 80's role was slated to change from major transcontinental highway to a lesser route on a national level. US 80 was to be replaced entirely by Interstates, except between Cuba, Alabama and Macon, Georgia; a short section of Interstate 65 and Interstate 85 were also slated to replace US 80 through Montgomery. By 1961, a section of I-85 meant to bypass US 80 through Mount Meigs between eastern Montgomery and Shorter was under construction. The freeway was completed in 1963 and US 80 moved onto the new highway, bypassing Mount Meigs altogether. Another section of I-85 meant to bypass US 80 from Shorter to Alliance was under construction between Shorter and Tuskegee. The entire proposed bypass was under construction the following year. I-85 from Shorter to Tuskegee was completed in 1965. I-65 in Montgomery had started construction, with construction commencing on I-85 between Atlanta Highway and Eastern Boulevard in Montgomery as well. Construction on the entirety of both Interstates in Montgomery was well under way in 1967. All of I-85 meant to bypass US 80 between eastern Montgomery and Alliance had been completed, though US 80 remained on its own route from Shorter to Alliance. I-65 north to US 80 in Montgomery (Fairview Avenue) was complete the next year, with I-85 still under construction between Atlanta Highway and the proposed junction with I-65 and likewise with I-65 between Fairview and proposed I-85. All of I-85 into downtown Montgomery was finished by 1972. I-20 and I-59 from the Mississippi state line to Cuba was also under construction as well as a four lane divided connecting road to US 80 and US 11. US 80 from the Dallas County line through Benton into north central Lowndes County began conversion into a four lane divided highway. I-65 had been completed to I-85 in downtown Montgomery by 1973. I-20/I-59 between Mississippi and Cuba had also been finished. SR 8 was moved off the US 80/US 11 concurrency at this time and onto the new four lane connecting road between US 80 and the new Interstate freeway, leaving only the hidden SR 7 designation on the U.S. Highway from Cuba to Mississippi. This also moved the western terminus of SR 8 to the new junction with I-20/I-59. The first segment of four lane highway conversion in Lowndes County between Selma and Montgomery had also been completed.

In 1975, work began on finishing the four lane divided highway through Lowndes County on either side of Lowndesboro. By 1979, all of US 80 between Selma and Montgomery had been converted into a four lane divided highway. Massive flooding throughout the western part of Alabama's Black Belt the same year caused floodwaters on the Tombigbee River to sweep the tugboat Cahaba upstream towards the Alabama River. The Cahaba collided with the Rooster Bridge and was sucked underwater by the torrent. Amazingly, the tugboat resurfaced on the other side of the bridge and righted itself back up. The bridge was closed to traffic right away to inspect it for damage. Despite the incident, plans were already in place to demolish the Rooster Bridge. Construction on a new set of four lane bridges upstream was being undertaken. Following completion of the new bridge, the original Rooster Bridge was demolished using dynamite in 1980, bringing an end to the local icon. By 1981, four lane work was undergoing on US 80 west of Selma. Four lane conversion had also begun between Demopolis and Faunsdale in 1983. By 1985, the route of US 80 and SR 8 through Montgomery had changed. Previously, US 80 and SR 8 had taken Mobile Highway to Fairview Avenue. From Fairview, eastbound US 80/SR 8 had taken Perry Street to Madison Avenue, while westbound traffic utilized Hull Street. The two highways then followed Madison Avenue and Atlanta Highway out of the city. The new route used South Boulevard and Eastern Boulevard to between Atlanta Highway and Mobile Highway to bypass downtown Montgomery entirely. Between 1986 and 1987, four lane conversion on sections of US 80 between Demopolis and Faunsdale and between Browns and Selma was completed, with a four lane bypass around Faunsdale under construction. The Faunsdale bypass was completed by 1989.

Elsewhere in the United States, the Interstate had brought the days of US 80 being a transcontinental highway to an end. California had formally decommissioned its segment of the highway between 1964 and 1969, followed by Arizona between 1977 and 1989 and New Mexico from 1989 to 1991. Though Texas decommissioned the majority of its section by 1991, the section from Dallas to Tybee Island remained and the routing has remained unaltered since. Today, I-20, I-10 and I-8 have taken the place of US 80's western segment. Though US 80 still exists between Dallas and Tybee Island, it has long since been replaced as a main highway through all of Mississippi and Louisiana by I-20 and between Macon and Savannah in Georgia by I-16. Alabama is a unique case, as US 80 still remains the main east west highway through Alabama's Black Belt, which is almost the entire highway within the state. Since 1987, the route between Cuba and Demopolis has been upgraded into a four lane highway, and US 80 was moved onto I-85 between Eastern Boulevard in Montgomery and I-85 Exit 16 east of Mount Meigs. US 80 has also been rerouted around Selma onto SR 41 and SR 14, while SR 8 continues to be routed on the older alignment through town. Today, the old Selma route, including the Edmund Pettus Bridge, is signed as US 80 Business.

== Future ==
The Alabama Department of Transportation (ALDOT) is planning to construct a 124-mile (200 km) extension of I-85 from Montgomery to I-20/I-59 near Cuba, shadowing the path of US 80 near Demopolis, Uniontown and Selma. The project was first proposed in 2005 and is estimated to cost at least $2.4 billion. ALDOT contracted Volkert and Associates, an engineering company, to oversee the project. In 2010, Volkert completed an environmental impact study with a preferred alternative route highlighted for consideration. The Federal Highway Administration (FHWA) approved the study and preferred alternative route. Besides the environmental impact, the project will also have to minimize the overall impact on the Selma to Montgomery National Trail as well as the many Civil Rights cultural resources, historical sites and structures along US 80 between Selma and Montgomery. Likewise, a group known as the Youth Infrastructure Coalition is lobbying for the proposed extension to become part of a suggested I-14, which the coalition proposes should run from Texas to Georgia. The coalition also wants a new Interstate to be constructed along the general path taken by US 80 between Montgomery and Macon, Georgia. As of 2018 however, the coalition has not met with ALDOT to discuss the proposal. Despite the support for the proposal with the people of Selma, ALDOT put forward an official statement, explaining the coalition's proposed I-14 would be unlikely to gain serious consideration.

== Major intersections ==
County	Location	mi (Note: Mileposts along US 80 in Alabama reflect hidden or co-signed state route numbers, instead of US 80 itself. Most of the mileposts on this list reflect the unsigned SR 8.)	km	Exit	Destinations	Notes
Sumter		0.000	0.000		US 11 south / US 80 west – Meridian	Continuation into Mississippi
Sumter	Cuba	1.628	2.620		CR 76 west (Lauderdale Road)	Eastern terminus of CR 76
Sumter	Cuba	1.732	2.787		CR 10 east (3rd Street)	West end of CR 10 concurrency
Sumter	Cuba	2.353	3.787		CR 10 west (Sheepskin Road)	East end of CR 10 concurrency
Sumter	Cuba	3.012 1.890	4.847 3.042		US 11 / SR 7 north / SR 8 west to I-20 / I-59 – York	East end of US 11/SR 7 concurrency; west end of SR 8 concurrency; SR 8 to I-20/1-59 unsigned; mileposts change to reflect SR 8
Sumter		7.806	12.563		SR 17 – York, Butler	Westbound entrance and connecting service road
Sumter		12.558	20.210		CR 13 north	Southern terminus of CR 13
Sumter		17.501	28.165		CR 21 north	Southern terminus of CR 21
Sumter		20.329	32.716		SR 28 west / CR 25 south – Livingston	West end of SR 28 concurrency; former US 80
Tombigbee River		23.718	38.170	Rooster Bridge		
Marengo		24.849	39.991		SR 28 east – Linden	East end of SR 28 concurrency
Marengo		28.266	45.490		CR 57 south	Northern terminus of CR 57
Marengo		29.574	47.595		CR 28 east (Old US 80)	Western terminus of CR 28; former US 80 east
Marengo		30.478	49.050		CR 28 west (Old US 80)	Eastern terminus of CR 28; former US 80 west
Marengo	Demopolis	34.646	55.757		US 43 (Cedar Avenue) / SR 13 north – Eutaw, Tuscaloosa	West end of US 41/SR 13 concurrency
Marengo	Demopolis	34.659	55.778		CR 21 south (Jefferson Road)	Northern terminus of CR 21
Marengo	Demopolis	35.598	57.289		US 43 south / SR 13 – Providence, Linden, Thomasville, Mobile	East end of US 43/SR 13 concurrency
Marengo	Alfalfa	38.862	62.542		CR 2 north – Arcola	Southern terminus of CR 2
Marengo		40.754	65.587		CR 77 north – Oak Grove	Southern terminus of CR 77
Hale	Gallion	42.223	67.951		SR 69 south / CR 12 east to CR 1 south – Providence	West end of SR 69 concurrency; western terminus of CR 12; former US 80 east
Hale	Prairieville	42.966	69.147		SR 69 north – Greensboro	East end of SR 69 concurrency
Marengo	Faunsdale	49.610	79.840		SR 25 – Greensboro, Dayton	
Perry	Uniontown	54.429	87.595		CR 53 south (West Avenue) – Thomaston	Northern terminus of CR 53
Perry	Uniontown	54.516	87.735		SR 61 north (Water Avenue) – Greensboro	Southern terminus of SR 61
Perry	Uniontown	54.674	87.989		SR 183 north / CR 1 south (East Avenue) to CR 12 west – Central Mills	Southern terminus of SR 183; northern terminus of CR 1
Dallas		62.399	100.421		CR 23 north – Vaiden	Southern terminus of CR 23
Dallas	Browns	63.764	102.618		SR 5 – Marion, Pine Hill	Interchange
Dallas	Massillon	67.501	108.632		CR 3 – Hamburg, Hazen	
Dallas	Marion Junction	70.365	113.241		CR 25 – Hamburg	
Dallas	Marion Junction	71.016	114.289		CR 29	Former US 80 east
Dallas	Harrell	72.099	116.032		CR 45 – Vilula, Hazen	
Dallas		75.705	121.835		CR 29 west	Eastern terminus of CR 29; former US 80 west
Dallas	Potter	77.872	125.323		CR 44 – Selma	Former US 80 east
Dallas	Potter	78.594	126.485		CR 27 (Westwood Drive)	
Dallas		79.909	128.601		SR 219 – Centreville	
Dallas		81.291	130.825		SR 14 west / Medical Center Parkway – Marion	West end of SR 14 concurrency
Dallas	Selma	82.899	133.413		CR 37 north (Langley Street) – Summerfield	Southern terminus of CR 37
Dallas	Selma	83.374 116.281	134.177 187.136		US 80 Bus. / SR 8 east / US 80 Truck begin / SR 22 (Broad Street) – Clanton	East end of SR 8 concurrency; west end of US 80 Truck concurrency; western terminus of US 80 Business/US 80 Truck; mileposts change to reflect SR 14
Dallas	Selma	116.885	188.108		CR 65 north (Marie Foster Street)	Southern terminus of CR 65
Dallas	Selma	117.158 127.484	188.548 205.166		SR 14 east (Highland Avenue) / SR 41 south	East end of SR 14 concurrency; west end of SR 41 concurrency; northern terminus of SR 41; mileposts change to reflect SR 41; former US 80 east
Dallas	Selma	126.343	203.329	—	Race Street	Interchange; eastbound exit and westbound entrance/exit
Dallas	Selma	125.920	202.649	—	CR 48 east (Water Street)	Interchange; western terminus of CR 48
Dallas	Selmont	125.042	201.236		SR 140 east / River Road	Western terminus of SR 140
Dallas	Alabama River	124.172	199.835	Bridge over the Alabama River		
Dallas	West Selmont	123.458	198.686		CR 56 (Old Montgomery Road)	Former US 80
Dallas	West Selmont	122.733 87.876	197.520 141.423		US 80 Bus. / SR 8 west / US 80 Truck ends / SR 41 south	East end of US 80 Truck/SR 41 concurrency; west end of SR 8 concurrency; eastern terminus of US 80 Business/US 80 Truck; mileposts change to reflect SR 8; former US 80 west
Dallas	West Selmont	89.862	144.619		CR 56 west (Old Montgomery Road)	Eastern terminus of CR 56; former US 80 west
Dallas	Casey	92.003	148.064		CR 67 south	Northern terminus of CR 67
Dallas		93.228	150.036		CR 69 north / CR 465 south	Southern terminus of CR 69; northern terminus of CR 465
Dallas		94.744	152.476		CR 43 south	Northern terminus of CR 43
Dallas		96.120	154.690		CR 7 – Braggs	
Dallas		98.048	157.793		CR 19 south	Northern terminus of CR 19
Lowndes		100.563	161.840		CR 40 east (Benton Road) – White Hall	Western terminus of CR 40
Lowndes		101.912	164.011		CR 9 south	Northern terminus of CR 9
Lowndes	Trickem	104.742	168.566		CR 17 south – Gordonville	West end of CR 17 concurrency
Lowndes	Trickem	104.857	168.751		CR 17 north (Trickem Cutoff Road)	East end of CR 17 concurrency
Lowndes		106.101	170.753		CR 23 north (White Hall Road) – White Hall	Southern terminus of CR 23
Lowndes	Lowndesboro	113.066	181.962		SR 97 south / CR 29 north (Broad Street) – Hayneville	Northern terminus of SR 97; southern terminus of CR 29
Lowndes	Hope Hull	118.650	190.949		SR 21 south – Hayneville	West end of SR 21 concurrency
Lowndes	Hope Hull	119.017	191.539		CR 37 north	West end of CR 37 concurrency
Lowndes	Hope Hull	119.355	192.083		CR 37 south – Letohatchee	East end of CR 37 concurrency
Montgomery	Mount Sinai	121.594	195.687		CR 7 north (Cantelou Road) – Antioch	Southern terminus of CR 7
Montgomery		122.566	197.251	—	Future I-85 north / SR 108 east to I-65 / Future I-685	Proposed intersection with future I-85; future western terminus of SR 108
Montgomery		123.286	198.410		CR 17 north (Mitchell Young Road) – Antioch	Southern terminus of CR 17
Montgomery	Montgomery	127.370	204.982		CR 15 south (Lamar Road) – Tyson	Northern terminus of CR 15
Montgomery	Montgomery	128.314	206.501	West end of freeway		
Montgomery	Montgomery	128.829	207.330	—	US 31 / SR 3 / SR 21 north (Mobile Highway) – Prattville, Greenville	Interchange; east end of SR 21 concurrency
Montgomery	Montgomery	129.595 167.103	208.563 268.926	—	I-65 south – Mobile	Mileposts change to reflect I-65; west end of I-65 concurrency; Exit 167 on I-65
Montgomery	Montgomery	168.213 153.189	270.713 246.534	168	I-65 north / US 82 / SR 6 west / SR 21 south (South Boulevard) – Birmingham	Mileposts change to reflect SR 6; east end of I-65 concurrency; west end of US 82/SR 6/SR 6 concurrency
Montgomery	Montgomery	154.771	249.080		US 331 south / SR 9 (Court Street) – Luverne	Northern terminus of US 331; west end of SR 9 concurrency
Montgomery	Montgomery	158.668 136.165	255.351 219.136		US 82 / SR 6 east / US 231 / SR 53 south (Troy Highway) – Troy	Mileposts change to reflect SR 8; east end of US 82/SR 6 concurrency; west end of US 231/SR 53 concurrency
Montgomery	Montgomery	139.293 6.546	224.170 10.535		I-85 south / US 231 / SR 9 / SR 21 / SR 53 north (Eastern Boulevard) to I-65	Mileposts change to reflect I-85; west end of I-85 concurrency; east end of US 231/SR 9/SR 21/SR 53 concurrency; Exit 6 on I-85
Montgomery	Montgomery	6.546	10.535	9	SR 271 (Taylor Road) to US 82 / US 231	Auburn University at Montgomery
Montgomery	Montgomery	11.009	17.717	11	SR 126 south (Atlanta Highway) to SR 110 – Mount Meigs, Mitylene	Former US 80
Montgomery	Mount Meigs	14.441	23.241	15	SR 108 west – Pike Road	Future I-85 south; eastern terminus of SR 108
Montgomery		16.067 148.814	25.857 239.493	16	I-85 north / SR 126 west – Atlanta, Georgia	Mileposts change to reflect SR 8; east end of I-85 concurrency; west end of SR 126 concurrency
Montgomery	Waugh	148.932– 150.417	239.683– 242.073		SR 126 east – Mount Meigs	East end of SR 126 concurrency; former US 80 west
Macon		154.011	247.857		CR 2 east – Cross Keys	Western terminus of CR 2
Macon	Shorter	157.108	252.841		SR 138 west to I-85	Eastern terminus of SR 138
Macon	Shorter	157.465	253.415		CR 40 east – Milsap	Western terminus of CR 40
Macon		159.645– 159.687	256.924– 256.991		CR 7 (Cross Keys Road)	
Macon	Calebee	161.111	259.283		CR 9 – Chesson	
Macon	La Place	163.303	262.811		CR 13 south – Hardaway	Northern terminus of CR 13
Macon		166.641	268.183		CR 49 north – Franklin	Southern terminus of CR 49
Macon		168.972	271.934		CR 18 east (Heritage Hill Road)	Western terminus of CR 18
Macon		170.126	273.791		CR 67 south (Morgan Russel Road) – Mount Andrew	Northern terminus of CR 67
Macon	Tuskegee	171.050	275.278		CR 51 north (Pleasant Springs Drive) to SR 49 / I-85	Southern terminus of CR 51
Macon	Tuskegee	173.848	279.781		US 29 / SR 15 south / SR 81 north (Main Street) – Notasulga, Union Springs	West end of US 29/SR 15 concurrency; southern terminus of SR 81
Macon		176.331	283.777		CR 53 north	Southern terminus of CR 53
Macon	Alliance	180.968	291.240		CR 89 south	Northern terminus of CR 89
Macon	Alliance	181.299	291.772	—	US 29 / SR 15 north / SR 186 west to I-85 – Auburn	East end of US 29/SR 15 concurrency; eastern terminus of SR 186
Macon	Alliance	182.233	293.276		CR 69 – Little Texas	
Macon		185.886	299.155		CR 24 – Dupree	
Macon		187.407– 187.412	301.602– 301.610		CR 22 (Glassy Mill Road/Callaway Baker Road) – Tuskegee	Former US 80 west
Macon	Society Hill	189.355	304.737		CR 26 west (Red Road) – Tuskegee	Western terminus of CR 26
Macon	Society Hill	189.658– 189.663	305.225– 305.233		CR 43 – Opelika	
Lee		190.815	307.087		CR 29 north / CR 160 south	Southern terminus of CR 29; northern terminus of CR 160
Lee		192.048	309.071		CR 11 north	Southern terminus of CR 11
Lee	Marvyn	194.488	312.998		SR 51 (Marvyn Parkway) – Hurtsboro	
Russell		196.509	316.251		CR 63 north (Gullatt Road) – Opelika	Southern terminus of CR 63
Russell		197.872	318.444		CR 65 (Jenkins Road/Wills Valley Road) – Uhland	
Russell		198.720	319.809		CR 21 (Herring Road) – Uhland	
Russell		199.470	321.016		CR 71 (Lamb Road) – Griffin Mill	Southern terminus of CR 71
Russell		202.930	326.584		CR 77 north (Flournoy Road) – Salem	West end of CR 77 concurrency
Russell		203.094	326.848		CR 77 south (Pharris Road)	East end of CR 77 concurrency
Russell	Crawford	204.443	329.019		SR 169 north (Brown Road) / CR 27 south – Opelika	West end of SR 169 concurrency; northern terminus of CR 27
Russell	Crawford	204.986	329.893		SR 169 south – Parkmanville	East end of SR 169 concurrency
Russell	Phenix City	214.384 113.942	345.018 183.372		US 280 / SR 38 west / US 431 / SR 1 north / 14th Street – Columbus, Georgia	Mileposts change to reflect SR 1; west end of concurrency with US 280 (SR 38)/US 431 (SR 1); 14th Street is former US 80 east
Russell	Phenix City	114.888 215.331	184.894 346.542		US 280 / SR 38 west / US 431 / SR 1 north – Opelika	Mileposts change to reflect SR 8; east end of concurrency with US 280 (SR 38)/US 431 (SR 1)
Russell	Phenix City	114.888 215.331	184.894 346.542	West end of freeway		
Russell	Phenix City	216.551	348.505	—	Summerville Road	Freeway interchange
Russell	Phenix City	217.477	349.995	—	Riverchase Drive	Freeway interchange
Russell	Chattahoochee River	217.887	350.655	Bridge over the Chattahoochee River		
Russell	Chattahoochee River	217.887	350.655	—	US 80 east / SR 22 east (J.R. Allen Parkway) / SR 540 east (Fall Line Freeway) – Columbus	Continuation into Georgia; eastern terminus of SR 8; east end of SR 8 concurrency
1.000 mi = 1.609 km; 1.000 km = 0.621 mi: Concurrency terminus; Incomplete access; Unopened

== Notes ==
U.S. Route 80
Previous state: Mississippi	Alabama	Next state: Georgia
