= Special routes of U.S. Route 80 =

Highway system

Special routes of U.S. Route 80

Highway system
- United States Numbered Highway System; List; Special; Divided

A total of ten special routes of U.S. Route 80 exist or did exist in the past.

== Arizona ==
=== Yuma business route ===
U.S. Route 80 Business
- Location: Winterhaven, California to Yuma, Arizona
- Existed: 1957–1976

U.S. Route 80 Business ran from Winterhaven, California, crossed the 1916 Ocean to Ocean Bridge over the Colorado River into Arizona and met up with mainline US 80 again in Yuma. Prior to 1957, this was the mainline route of US 80. The Ocean to Ocean Bridge is still open to traffic as a one lane bridge with traffic lights at either end.

=== Phoenix alternate routes ===
The city of Phoenix had at least two alternate routes of US 80.

19th Street alternate route

U.S. Route 80 Alternate
- Location: Phoenix

U.S. Route 80 Alternate (US 80 Alt.) was an alternate route of US 80 paralleling the main route in southwestern Phoenix. US 80 Alt. began at US 80 at 19th Avenue and Buckeye Road, traveling north to Van Buren Street, where it turned right before terminating at US 80 at the intersection of 17th Avenue and Van Buren. The highway appeared on a 1937 Map of Phoenix within a set of general highway maps produced by the State of Arizona depicting Maricopa County. By the time the 1948 state highway map had been published, US 80 Alt. was gone.

Washington Street alternate route

U.S. Route 80 Alternate
- Location: Phoenix and Tempe
- Existed: 1930–1961

U.S. Route 80 Alternate (US 80 Alt.) was a short alternate route of US 80 located entirely within the Phoenix metro area in Maricopa County, Arizona, serving as a parallel alternate routing to mainline US 80 between Phoenix and Tempe. This route was added to the state highway system in 1930. US 80 Alt. ran down Washington Street between 16th Street in Phoenix and an interchange with US 60, US 70, US 80 and US 89 immediately north of Tempe. It paralleled the main route of US 80 which ran down Van Buren Street. US 80 Alt. Was abandoned to the city of Phoenix in 1961. The route did not appear on maps, meaning there is a likelihood US 80 Alt. was never signed.

=== Tombstone truck route ===
U.S. Route 80 Truck
- Location: Tombstone
- Existed: 1955–1964

U.S. Route 80 Truck (US 80 Truck) was a designated truck route in Tombstone, Arizona. US 80 Truck was first designated around 1955. It ran down six blocks of Fremont Street between Sumner Street and 6th Street, both of which were sections of main line US 80. US 80 itself used Allen Street between Sumner and 6th. US 80 Truck was decommissioned when main line US 80 was rerouted onto Fremont Street between Sumner Street and 6th Street. The re-routing of US 80 down US 80 Truck sparked widespread controversy across the state of Arizona, due to the heavy modifications needed to be made to Fremont Street, which was the location of several historic buildings. This was because the modifications included altering the appearance of several historic buildings and structures along Fremont Street to make room for a wider four lane highway. Officials in both the state government and Tombstone city council had to deny several petitions against the re-routing, while a group of 275 Tombstone citizens signed a petition in favor of the new highway.

== Texas ==
=== El Paso alternate route ===
Alternate U.S. Highway 80
- Location: El Paso
- Existed: 1939–1964

U.S. Route 80 (Alternate) in El Paso ran southbound from the junction of Farm To Market Road 260 and U.S. 80, following Doniphan Drive through the former community of White Spur (now part of Northwest El Paso). The route continued southbound until Doniphan Drive ended at Paisano Drive, in Smeltertown. U.S. 80 (Alternate), and Paisano drive then followed the tracks of the Atchison, Topeka and Santa Fe Railway along the eastern bank of the Rio Grande until Union Station in Downtown El Paso. U.S. 80 (Alternate) then rejoined U.S. 80 at Texas Avenue in Downtown El Paso. U.S. Route 85 now follows this routing from Paisano Drive's current junction with Interstate 10.

=== Abilene–Weatherford alternate route ===
Alternate U.S. Highway 80
- Location: Abilene–Weatherford
- Length: 130 mi (210 km)
- Existed: 1932–1943

U.S. Route 80 Alternate (Breckenridge) was an alternate route of U.S. 80 that ran between Abilene and Weatherford from 1932 to 1943. An approved amendment to the original route for Texas State Highway 1, the Texarkana-to-El Paso highway first proposed in 1917, the route was included in the re-designation of SH 1 to U.S. Route 80, and was designated as US 80N in July 1932. Diverging from the El Paso-to-Dallas section of U.S. Route 80 at Abilene, the alternate route ran northeast for 36 miles to Albany, then east for 26 miles to Breckenridge. Continuing east for 35 miles, the route turned southeast, traversing the Metcalf Gap, a pass through the low range of hills and mesas known as the Palo Pinto Mountains, before heading east for 36 miles to Weatherford. From Weatherford the alternate route rejoined the main route and continued east to Fort Worth and the terminus of U.S. 80 in Dallas. Bypassing the main route, which continued east from Abilene through Eastland, Cisco, and Strawn to Weatherford, the alternate route allowed travelers to pass near historic Fort Griffin, traverse the unique topography of the Western Cross Timbers, and take the waters in the town of Mineral Wells, known for its mineral-rich springs.

The entire route of US 80 Alt. was canceled in July 1943, and the section from the intersection with US 80 in Weatherford through Breckenridge to Albany was re-designated as part of US 180. This new route would continue west from Albany to the New Mexico state line west of Seminole, before continuing west to El Paso in concurrence with U.S. Route 62. The section from Albany to Abilene would be given its current designation of SH 351 in August 1943.

== Louisiana ==
=== Minden truck route ===
U.S. Highway 80 Truck
- Location: Minden, Louisiana

U.S. Route 80 Truck, cosigned with U.S. Route 79 Truck, is a truck route of U.S. 80 through Minden. The route begins at the intersection of Sheppard Street and Shreveport Road, and heads in an eastern direction towards U.S. 80's current alignment along Union Street. Truck U.S. 80 ends at the intersection with mainline US 80, but Truck U.S. 79 follows U.S. 80's alignment, then turns north at an intersection with LA 531.

=== Gibsland truck route ===
U.S. Highway 80 Truck
- Location: Gibsland, Louisiana

U.S. Route 80 Truck, cosigned with Louisiana Highway 799, is a truck route of U.S. 80 through Gibsland. It follows the route of LA 799, allowing truck traffic to avoid the downtown part of Gibsland. It begins at an intersection with US 80, known as South Third Street, where US 80 turns to the north, following South Main Street, which is also LA 154. Truck US 80 follows South Third Street, turning north along Gibbs Street. Truck US 80 ends at an intersection with South First Street.

=== Arcadia truck route ===
U.S. Highway 80 Truck
- Location: Arcadia, Louisiana

U.S. Route 80 Truck, cosigned with Louisiana Highway 798-1 and Louisiana Highway 151, is a truck route of U.S. 80 through Arcadia. It follows the route of LA 798–1, allowing truck traffic to avoid the main street of Arcadia. US 80 Truck begins at an intersection with US 80, LA 9, and LA 519. It follows LA 798-1 along Second Street, which is less commercialized than US 80 one block to the south. US 80 Truck then turns south to follow LA 151 until the intersection with US 80.

== Alabama ==
=== Selma business route ===
U.S. Route 80 Business
- Location: Selma, Alabama
- Length: 4.492 mi (7.229 km)

U.S. Route 80 Business (US 80 Bus.) is a former segment of US 80 in Selma, Alabama, with far more significance than a typical business route.

The route begins at US 80 and Alabama State Route 22 (SR 22), in a wrong-way concurrency with SR 22. Both routes travel south along Broad Street. South of Voeglin Avenue, the road crosses a pair of railroad lines then makes a southeast curve just before the intersection with J.L. Chestnut Junior Boulevard. The concurrency with SR 22 ends at Dallas Avenue, when it makes a right turn to head west.

At Water Avenue north of the Alabama River, US 80 Bus. approaches the Edmund Pettus Bridge, the site of the infamous police attack on the Selma to Montgomery marches. After the bridge, frontage roads begin on both sides, and the southeast-bound frontage road immediately leads to the National Voting Rights Museum. The first marked routes that intersect the road on this side of the river are Dallas County Road 56 (CR 56; Old Montgomery Highway) and Dallas CR 77 (King's Bend Road). Shortly after this, the frontage roads gradually diminish. The road curves to the southeast as it crosses a railroad line and serves as the eastern terminus of Roosevelt Avenue at the same time. US 80 Bus. ends at US 80 and SR 41.

The entire route is in Dallas County.

| Location | mi | km | Destinations | Notes |
|---|---|---|---|---|
| Selma | 83.374 | 134.177 | US 80 / SR 8 west / US 80 Truck east / SR 14 / SR 14 Truck east (Highland Avenue) / SR 22 east (Broad Street) – Uniontown, Autaugaville, Valley Grande | Western terminus of US 80 Bus. and US 80 Truck; western end of SR 8/SR 22 concurrency |
| Selma | 84.518 | 136.019 | J.L. Chestnut Jr. Boulevard – Old Cahawba Archaeological Park | Former US 80 west |
| Selma | 84.876 | 136.595 | SR 22 west (Dallas Avenue) – Safford | Eastern end of SR 22 concurrency |
| Alabama River | 85.178 | 137.081 | Edmund Pettus Bridge | |
| West Selmont | 85.643 | 137.829 | CR 56 east (Old Montgomery Highway) | Western terminus of CR 56; former US 80 east |
| West Selmont | 87.876 | 141.423 | US 80 / SR 8 east / US 80 Truck west / SR 41 – Benton, Camden | Eastern terminus of US 80 Bus. and US 80 Truck; eastern end of SR 8 concurrency |
1.000 mi = 1.609 km; 1.000 km = 0.621 mi: Concurrency terminus

=== Selma truck route ===
U.S. Route 80 Truck
- Location: Selma, Alabama
- Length: 5.628 mi (9.057 km)

U.S. Route 80 Truck (US 80 Truck) is a special route of US 80 in Selma, Alabama entirely concurrent with part of main line US 80 as well as parts of Alabama State Route 14 (SR 14) and SR 41. Despite being a redundant designation, the existence of the truck route seems to be a way of ensuring insterstate truck traffic utilizes the Selma bypass route rather than taking US 80 Business through downtown.

The Truck route begins at the intersection of Broad Street and Highland Avenue in Selma. The intersection also serves as the beginning of US 80 Business and the SR 14 Truck route. This is also the western end of its concurrency with SR 14 and US 80. US 80 Truck continues east on Highland Avenue, passing a junction with Dallas County Route 65 at Marie Foster Street. At the northern terminus of SR 41, SR 14 continues east on Highland, while US 80 and US 80 Truck turn south onto SR 41. Despite signage, SR 14 Truck ends here as well. There are two freeway grade interchanges at Race Street/J.L. Chestnut Junior Boulevard and Water Street (CR 48). US 80 Truck passes an intersection with SR 140 that also serves as the western terminus of said state highway. US 80 Truck crosses the Alabama River into West Selmont, intersecting with Old Montgomery Highway (CR 56). US 80 Truck ends at the intersection with US 80; US 80 Bus. and SR 41, despite erroneous signage suggesting it continues onto mainline US 80 south of the intersection.

The entire route is in Dallas County.

| Location | mi | km | Destinations | Notes |
|---|---|---|---|---|
| Selma | 116.281 | 187.136 | US 80 / SR 8 / SR 14 west (Highland Avenue) / US 80 Bus. east / SR 8 east / SR 22 (Broad Street) / SR 14 Truck begins – Clanton | West end of US 80, SR 14 and SR 14 Truck concurrency; western terminus of US 80 Bus. and US 80 Truck; mileposts reflect SR 14 |
| Selma | 116.885 | 188.108 | CR 65 north (Marie Foster Street) | Southern terminus of CR 65 |
| Selma | 117.158 127.484 | 188.548 205.166 | SR 14 east / SR 14 Truck ends (Highland Avenue) / SR 41 south | East end of SR 14 and SR 14 Truck concurrency; west end of SR 41 concurrency; northern terminus of SR 41; mileposts change to reflect SR 41 |
| Selma | 126.343 | 203.329 | Race Street/J.L. Chestnut Jr. Boulevard | Interchange; eastbound exit and westbound entrance/exit |
| Selma | 125.920 | 202.649 | CR 48 east (Water Street) | Interchange; western terminus of CR 48 |
| Selmont | 125.042 | 201.236 | SR 140 east / River Road | Western terminus of SR 140 |
| Alabama River | 124.172 | 199.835 | Bridge over the Alabama River | |
| West Selmont | 123.458 | 198.686 | CR 56 (Old Montgomery Road) | Former US 80 |
| West Selmont | 122.733 | 197.520 | US 80 / US 80 Bus. west / SR 8 / SR 41 south | East end of US 80 Truck/SR 41 concurrency; west end of SR 8 concurrency; eastern terminus of US 80 Business and US 80 Truck |
1.000 mi = 1.609 km; 1.000 km = 0.621 mi: Concurrency terminus; Incomplete access
