= Palo Pinto Mountains State Park =

State park in Texas, United States

- Tucker Lake in Palo Pinto Mountains State Park

- Location within Texas Location within the United States
- Location: Palo Pinto County and Stephens County Texas, United States
- Nearest city: Strawn
- Coordinates: 32°31′48″N 98°34′12″W
- Area: 4,871 acres (1,971 ha)
- Established: 2011
- Governing body: Texas Parks and Wildlife Department

Palo Pinto Mountains State Park is a 4,871-acre (1,971 ha) state park in Palo Pinto and Stephens County, Texas near the City of Strawn. The park is administered by the Texas Parks and Wildlife Department, which bought the former ranch from private landowners in October 2011 with the assistance of The Nature Conservancy. Texas Parks and Wildlife planned to open the park in 2023, but moved the opening tentatively to 2026 because of labor and materials supply issues due to the COVID-19 pandemic in the United States. The park finally opened to the public on March 1, 2026, with the official grand opening ceremony held on April 10, 2026.

== Nature ==
The park is located in the Western Cross Timbers Ecoregion.

=== Tucker Lake ===
The park surrounds Tucker Lake, a 90-acre (36 ha) reservoir completed in 1937 by the Works Progress Administration (WPA) with financing from the Public Works Administration. Originally called Strawn Lake, it was renamed to honor a local mayor. The reservoir is about 35 feet at its deepest point. It is owned by the City of Strawn and provides drinking water for the town. Vacation cottages once stood along the western bank but are now in ruins. Fish found in Tucker Lake include bass, catfish, crappie, bluegill and sunfish. Only boats with electric motors are allowed.

=== Plants ===
The park is home to various types of trees, including live oak, blackjack oak, Texas red oak, post oak, Texas ash, prickly ash, cedar elm, mesquite, ashe juniper and pecan. There are bluebonnets, Indian blanket, prickly poppy, coreopsis, soft goldenaster, Texas bluebell, little bluestem, prickly pear cactus and sideoats grama, the state grass of Texas.

=== Animals ===
The park has white-tailed deer, common raccoon, eastern fox squirrel, coyote, whiptail lizard, cricket frog, red-eared slider and a variety of birds including painted bunting, great blue heron and the endangered golden-cheeked warbler.
