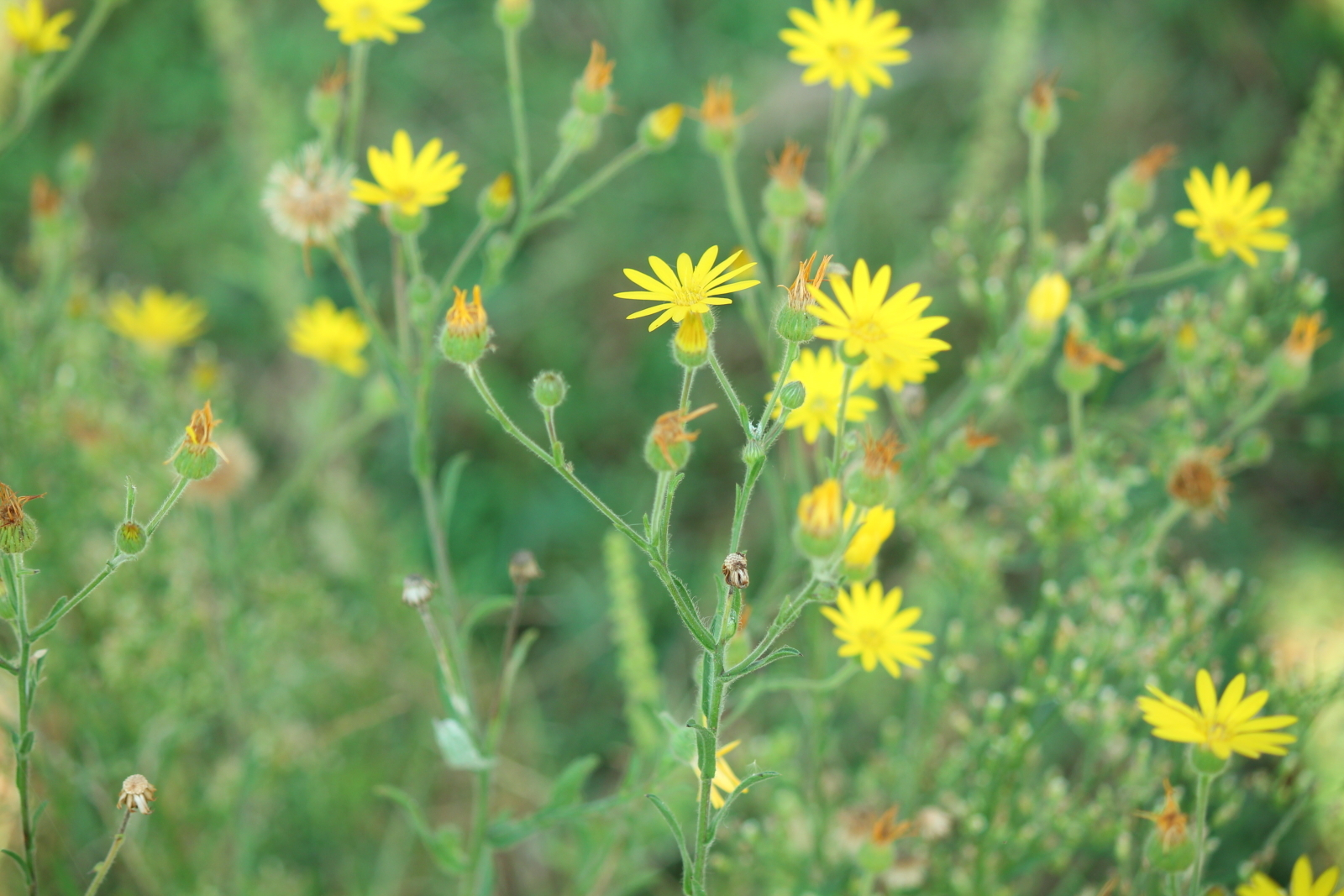

Scientific classification
- Kingdom: Plantae
- Clade: Tracheophytes
- Clade: Angiosperms
- Clade: Eudicots
- Clade: Asterids
- Order: Asterales
- Family: Asteraceae
- Genus: Bradburia
- Species: B. pilosa

Binomial name
- Bradburia pilosa (Nutt.) Semple 1996

Synonyms
- Chrysopsis nuttallii Britton; Chrysopsis pilosa Nutt.; Diplogon nuttallianum Kuntze; Heterotheca pilosa (Nutt.) Shinners

= Bradburia pilosa =

Species of flowering plant

Bradburia pilosa, the soft goldenaster, is a North American species of flowering plant in the family Asteraceae, native to the south-central United States. It is primarily found in the southeastern Great Plains and lower Mississippi Valley, in the states of Texas, Oklahoma, Kansas, Missouri, Arkansas, Louisiana, Tennessee, Mississippi, and Alabama. Additional populations have been reported further east (from Florida to Virginia), but these appear to be introductions. Its habitats include disturbed roadsides and pine-oak-juniper woods.

Bradburia pilosa is an annual plant growing up to 80 cm (31 in) tall, and it produces yellow flower heads. Its Disc florets are fertile, unlike those of the closely related B. hirtella.
