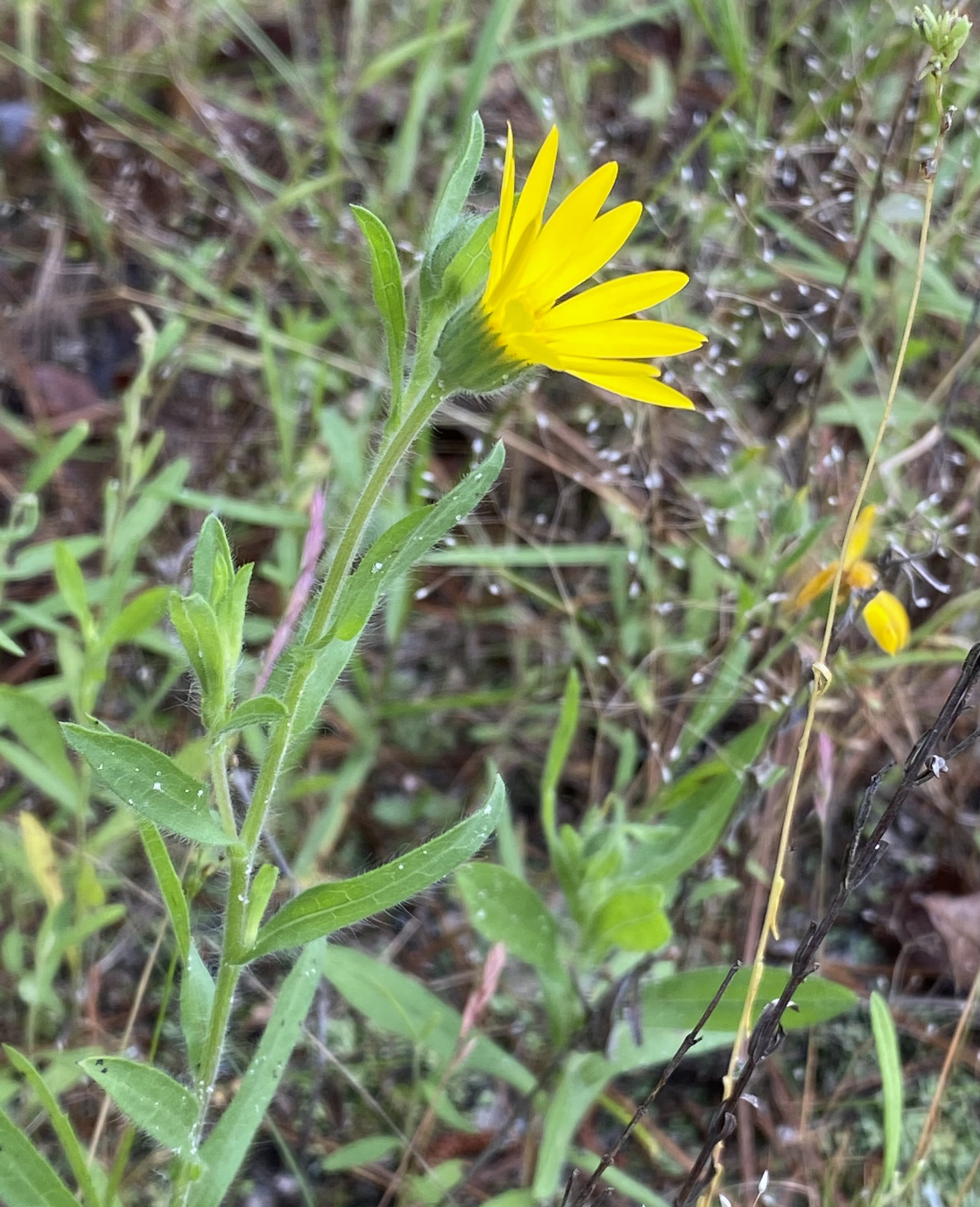
- Bradburia pilosa in Texas

Scientific classification
- Kingdom: Plantae
- Clade: Embryophytes
- Clade: Tracheophytes
- Clade: Angiosperms
- Clade: Eudicots
- Clade: Asterids
- Order: Asterales
- Family: Asteraceae
- Subfamily: Asteroideae
- Tribe: Astereae
- Subtribe: Chrysopsidinae
- Genus: Bradburia; Torr. & A.Gray 1842, conserved name, not Bradburya Raf. 1817 (syn Bradburia Spreng. 1826) (Fabaceae)

Synonyms
- Chrysopsis sect. Bradburia (Torr. & A.Gray) G.L.Nesom; Mauchia Kuntze, rejected name

= Bradburia (plant) =

Genus of flowering plants

Bradburia is a North American genus of flowering plants in the family Asteraceae, native to the southern United States.

The genus is named for British naturalist John Bradbury, 1768–1823.

Species

- Bradburia hirtella Torr. & A.Gray - Texas, Louisiana
- Bradburia pilosa (Nutt.) Semple - southeastern + south-central United States
