= Mary Ward Brown =

American short story writer and memoirist

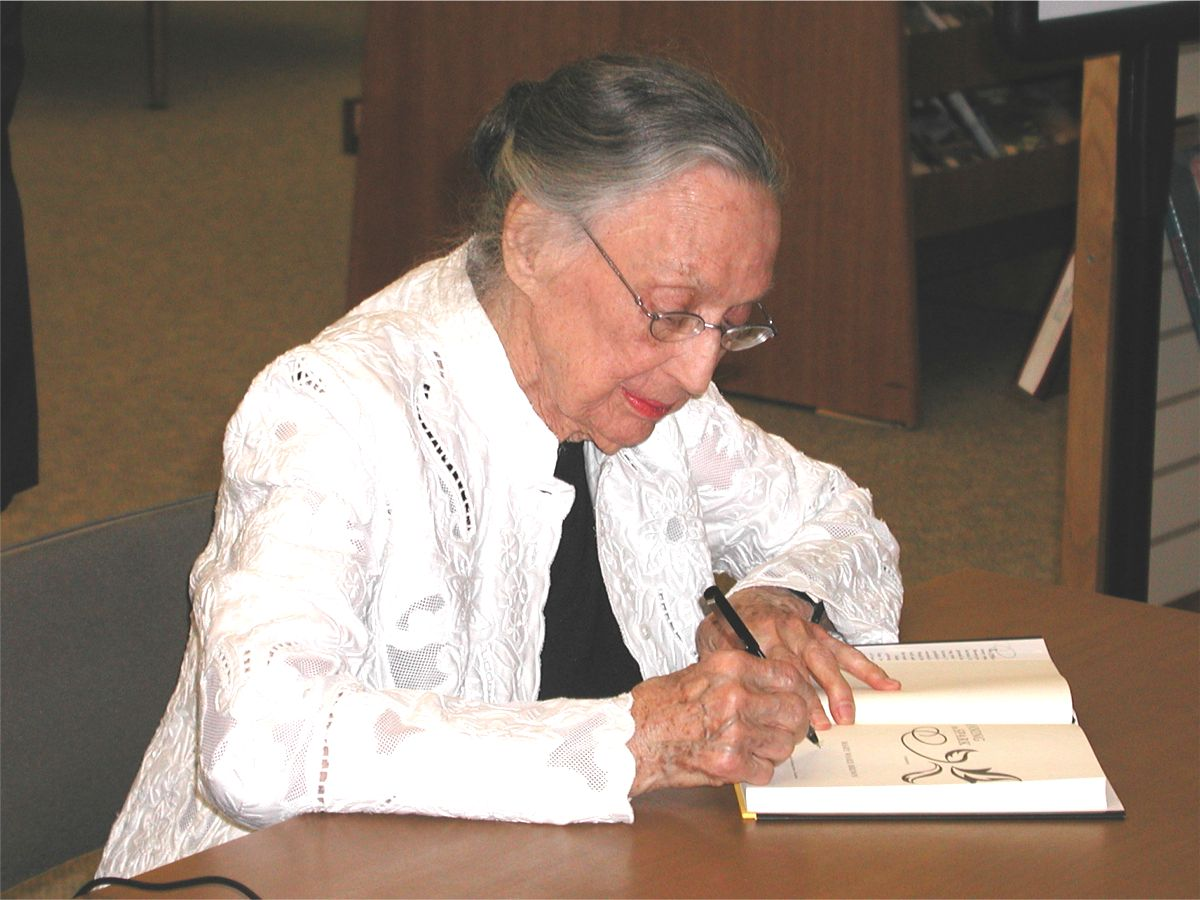
- Brown signing one of her books
- Born: Mary Ward; June 18, 1917 Hamburg, Alabama, U.S.
- Died: May 14, 2013 (aged 95)
- Occupation: Short story writer, memoirist

Mary Ward Brown (June 18, 1917 – May 14, 2013) was an American short story writer and memoirist. Her works largely feature Alabama as a setting and have received several awards.

== Early life ==
Brown was born on June 18, 1917, in Hamburg, Alabama. She graduated from Judson College. She had two half-brothers; one was Sheldon Fitts, who played college football for the Georgia Bulldogs football team.

== Career ==
Her first collection of short stories, Tongues of Flame, published in 1986, won the PEN/Hemingway (1987), the Alabama Author Award (1987), the Lillian Smith Book Award (1991), and the Hillsdale Fiction Prize (2003). Following her second collection of short stories, It Wasn't All Dancing, published in 2002, Brown was awarded the Alabama Library Author Award (2003), the Hillsdale Award for Fiction (2003), and the Harper Lee Award (2002).

Author Paul Theroux has said of her writing that it was "...direct, unaffected, unsentimental, and powerful for its simplicity and for its revealing the inner life of rural Alabama...". Her story "Cure" was included in The Best American Short Stories 1984 (edited by John Updike & Shannon Ravenel). Southern journalist John S. Sledge called Brown "our genius, our Chekov".

== Books ==
- Tongues of Flame (1986) New York: E.P. Dutton. ISBN 9780525244318.
- It wasn't all dancing, and other stories (2002) Tuscaloosa: University of Alabama Press. ISBN 9780817350079.
- Fanning the spark: a memoir (2009) Tuscaloosa: University of Alabama Press. ISBN 9780817381547.

== Death ==
Brown died of pancreatic cancer in Marion, Alabama, on May 14, 2013.
