= Alabama State Route 97 =

State highway in Alabama, United States

State Route 97

Route information
- Maintained by ALDOT
- Length: 29.798 mi (47.955 km)

Major junctions
- South end: US 331 in Highland Home
- US 31 in Davenport; I-65 in Letohatchee; SR 21 in Hayneville
- North end: US 80 in Lowndesboro

Location
- Country: United States
- State: Alabama
- Counties: Crenshaw, Montgomery, Lowndes

Highway system
- Alabama State Highway System; Interstate; US; State
← SR 96	→ US 98

State Route 97 (SR 97) is a 29.798-mile-long (47.955 km) state highway that extends from near Highland Home in Crenshaw County to Lowndesboro in Lowndes County.

== Route description ==
The southern terminus of SR 97 is located at an intersection with U.S. Route 331 (US 331) to the west of Lapine. From this point, the highway travels in a northwesterly direction to Davenport. From Davenport, the highway shares its right-of-way with US 31 for approximately 2 miles (3.2 km) while traveling in a westerly direction. After splitting from US 31, it resumes its northwesterly track en route to Hayneville, before turning to the north towards its northern terminus at US 80 in Lowndesboro.

== Major intersections ==
County	Location	mi	km	Destinations	Notes
Crenshaw	Highland Home	0.000	0.000	US 331 (SR 9) – Luverne, Montgomery	Southern terminus
Montgomery	No major junctions				
Lowndes	Davenport	9.118	14.674	US 31 north (SR 3) – Montgomery	Southern end of US 31/SR 3 concurrency
Lowndes		10.588	17.040	US 31 south (SR 3) – Greenville, Mobile	Northern end of US 31/SR 3 concurrency
Lowndes		14.844	23.889	I-65 – Mobile, Montgomery	I-65 exit 151
Lowndes	Hayneville	23.799	38.301	SR 21 – Monroeville, Montgomery	
Lowndes	Lowndesboro	29.798	47.955	US 80 (SR 8) / CR 29 north – Lowndesboro, Selma, Montgomery	Northern terminus
1.000 mi = 1.609 km; 1.000 km = 0.621 mi: Concurrency terminus
