= Alabama State Route 61 =

State highway in Alabama, United States

State Route 61

Route information
- Maintained by ALDOT
- Length: 18.311 mi (29.469 km)
- Existed: 1940–present

Major junctions
- South end: US 80 at Uniontown
- North end: SR 14 at Greensboro

Location
- Country: United States
- State: Alabama
- Counties: Perry, Hale

Highway system
- Alabama State Highway System; Interstate; US; State
← SR 60	→ SR 62

State Route 61 (SR 61) is an 18.311-mile-long (29.469 km) state highway in the west-central part of the U.S. state of Alabama. The southern terminus of the highway is at an intersection with U.S. Route 80 (US 80) at Uniontown. The northern terminus of the highway is at an intersection with SR 14 at Greensboro.

== Route description ==
SR 61 travels through Alabama's Black Belt region, perhaps the poorest area of the state. From its southern terminus at Uniontown, the highway travels through a sparsely populated region along a two-lane road in a general northward trajectory. The highway takes a slight turn towards the northwest as it approaches its northern terminus at Greensboro.

== Major intersections ==
County	Location	mi	km	Destinations	Notes
Perry	Uniontown	0.000	0.000	US 80 (SR 8)	Southern terminus
Hale	Greensboro	18.311	29.469	SR 14 – Greensboro, Marion	Northern terminus
1.000 mi = 1.609 km; 1.000 km = 0.621 mi
