= Palo Pinto Mountains =

Mountain range in Texas, United States

- Location within Texas

Highest point
- Elevation: 1,447 ft (441 m)
- Coordinates: 32°39′00″N 98°31′00″W

Naming
- English translation: Painted stick/wood/pole/tree

Geography
- Location: Palo Pinto County, Texas, United States

Climbing
- Easiest route: Drive/hike

The term Palo Pinto Mountains properly refers to a specific cuesta-like range of hills in western Palo Pinto County, Texas. The name Palo Pinto roughly translates to "painted stick" in reference to the juniper trees of the area. Isolated, rugged, and scenic, the ridge extends some 15 miles, from near the intersection of Texas State Highway 16 and Farm to Market Road 207 in the southwest, to Crawford Mountain just south of the Fortune Bend on the Brazos River in the northeast.

The Palo Pinto Mountains are located in, and form part of, the Carbonate Cross Timbers, a level IV ecoregion defined by the Environmental Protection Agency. However, the term "Palo Pinto Mountains" is also used colloquially to refer to a much larger area, essentially the entire portion of the much more extensive Western Cross Timbers located north of I-20. The mountains have been called a northern extension of the Hill Country, and indeed they are both dissected plateaus featuring karst topography with similar vegetation, including post oak (Quercus stellata), blueberry juniper (Juniperus ashei), and mesquite. The smaller Carbonate Cross Timbers also has a limestone substrate, as does the Hill Country, although the surrounding Western Cross Timbers area is underlain by sandstone, instead.

The high point of the range depends on which definition used; if referring to the specific line of hills, the high point is Crawford Mountain at the north end, with an elevation of 1,470 feet (450 m) and about 360 feet (110 m) of prominence. If referring to the broader hilly region, however, the highest point is the unnamed high point of Stephens County, at 1,628 feet (496 m).

== Human habitation and access ==
Using the broader colloquial definition of the Palo Pinto Mountains, they cover all of Jack and Palo Pinto Counties, most of Stephens County, large parts of Parker, Montague, and Wise Counties, and smaller portions of Young, Cooke, and Clay Counties. This area includes the towns of Bowie (on the northwestern fringe), Graham, Jacksboro, Bridgeport, Decatur (on the eastern edge), Breckenridge, Mineral Wells, and Springtown. It also includes Possum Kingdom Lake and its state park as well as Palo Pinto Mountains State Park, near Strawn opened in 2026.

Using the strict definition of the Palo Pinto Mountains, the only road that crosses the range is US 180, which enters from the east at a pass known as Metcalf Gap, although State Highway 16 south of US 180 runs adjacent to the eastern escarpment of the cuesta. Regarding the broader region, however, US 380 and State Highway 114 traverse the area's northern fringes, and US 281 runs north-south through the region; State Highway 59 also runs through the northeastern portion. Numerous farm-to-market (FM) roads, most notably FM 4, also cross the area.
