= Metcalf Gap =

Coordinates: 32°43′00″N 98°27′00″W

Metcalf Gap (Texas)

Metcalf Gap is a pass through the Palo Pinto Mountains located in the Western Cross Timbers region of northern Texas. Located roughly midway between the towns of Breckenridge and Mineral Wells, the pass lies at an elevation of about 1,200 feet (370 m) and forms a distinct gap in the escarpment formed by the Palo Pinto Mountains, a fifteen-mile long range of cuesta-type hills that runs southwest to northeast across southern Palo Pinto, County. The pass, as well as a small, similarly named community at the eastern end of the pass, were named in honor of local rancher and surveyor J.J. Metcalf, who surveyed, among other things, the townsite of county seat Palo Pinto, then known as Golconda.

== Transcontinental Route ==
In 1917, the newly created Texas Highway Department approved a plan for the construction and designation of State Highway 1, the Texarkana-to-El Paso road. While most of the proposed course mirrored the route of the Texas & Pacific Railroad across the state, two short alternative routes were approved by highway planners. One of these, later known as SH 1 A, would see the main route split near Weatherford, travel west through Mineral Wells, traverse the Metcalf Gap, then continue west through Breckenridge and Albany before turning southwest to Abilene, at which point it would rejoin the main route. When the highway was chosen to be part of the new U.S. Highway system in 1926, the alternative route through Metcalf Gap was included in the re-designation, becoming U.S. Route 80 (Alternative), also known as U.S. Route 80 A.

The designation of the Metcalf Gap route as part of the newly designated U.S. Route 80, a 2,671-mile transcontinental highway from Savannah, Georgia to San Diego, California, and the inclusion of the alternative route in the public notices and private advertisements that touted the new “all-weather, coast-to-coast” highway to travelers nationwide, quickly turned a small detour through the Western Cross Timbers region of northern Texas into part of a growing national network of large, improved transcontinental and interstate routes. This sudden increase in visibility would only last until 1943, when, increasingly bypassed in favor of the main route through Strawn and Cisco, the alternative route through Metcalf Gap would canceled, and that section of the road between Weatherford and Albany re-designated as part of U.S. Route 180, a new highway that would continue west from Albany to the Texas-New Mexico state line near Seminole before continuing west to El Paso in concurrence with U.S. Route 62.

== Access ==
Located 9.5 miles west of the small community of Palo Pinto, Metcalf Gap can be accessed from the east and west via the section of U.S. Route 180 between Mineral Wells and Breckenridge. From the north and south the pass can be accessed via Texas State Highway 16, an intrastate highway that runs concurrently through the pass with U.S. 180 before turning south towards Strawn.
