= Alabama State Route 140 =

State highway in Alabama, United States

State Route 140

Route information
- Maintained by ALDOT
- Length: 12.480 mi (20.085 km)
- Existed: 1986–present

Major junctions
- West end: US 80 / US 80 Truck / SR 14 Truck / SR 22 Truck / SR 41 southeast of Selma
- East end: SR 14 southeast of Burnsville

Location
- Country: United States
- State: Alabama
- Counties: Dallas County

Highway system
- Alabama State Highway System; Interstate; US; State
← SR 139	→ SR 141

State Route 140 (SR 140) is a 12.480-mile-long (20.085 km) state highway in Dallas County in the U.S. state of Alabama. It begins at US 80/US 80 Truck/SR 14 Truck/SR 22 Truck/SR 41 just southeast of Selma and ends at an intersection with SR 14 southeast of Burnsville, near the Autauga County line.

== Route description ==
SR 140 begins at an intersection with US 80/US 80 Truck/SR 14 Truck/SR 22 Truck/SR 41 just southeast of Selma. It heads to the east-southeast roughly parallel to the Alabama River. As the river curves to the northeast of Selma, so, too, does SR 140. Near the end of the highway, the river bends away to the east and SR 140 continues to the north. It ends at an intersection with SR 14 southeast of Burnsville, less than 0.5 miles (0.80 km) from the Autauga County line.

== History ==
SR 140 was previously created on a route from US 82/SR 6 east of Gordo to US 82/SR 6 in Coker. This route was decommissioned by 1979 and is now County Road 140. The current SR 140 was created between 1983 and 1985. It is routed along the former route of SR 14. When a new bypass route heading from the northeastern side of Selma towards Prattville was completed, SR 14 was aligned along the new route, and SR 140 was assigned to the former route of SR 14.

== Major intersections ==
The entire route is in Dallas County.

Location	mi	km	Destinations	Notes
	0.000	0.000	US 80 (SR 8) / US 80 Truck / SR 14 Truck / SR 22 Truck / SR 41 (Cecil Jackson Bypass) – Demopolis, Montgomery	Western terminus
	12.480	20.085	SR 14 – Selma, Prattville	Eastern terminus
1.000 mi = 1.609 km; 1.000 km = 0.621 mi
