= Bellamy, Alabama =

Place in Sumter County, Alabama, United States

- Unincorporated community Census-designated place
- Location of Bellamy in Sumter County, Alabama.
- Coordinates: 32°27′15″N 88°07′21″W
- Country: United States
- State: Alabama
- County: Sumter

Area
  - Total: 3.82 sq mi (9.89 km^{2})
  - Land: 3.78 sq mi (9.78 km^{2})
  - Water: 0.042 sq mi (0.11 km^{2})
- Elevation: 92 ft (28 m)

Population (2020)
  - Total: 363
  - Density: 96.1/sq mi (37.11/km^{2})
- Time zone: UTC-6 (Central (CST))
  - Summer (DST): UTC-5 (CDT)
- ZIP code: 36901
- Area codes: 205, 659
- GNIS feature ID: 2628579

Bellamy is a census-designated place and unincorporated community in Sumter County, Alabama, United States. As of the 2020 census, Bellamy had a population of 363.

== Demographics ==
Historical population
Census	Pop.	Note	%±
2010	543		—
2020	363		−33.1%
U.S. Decennial Census; 1850 1860 1870; 1880 1890-1900; 1910 1920 1930; 1940 1950 1960; 1970 1980 1990; 2000 2010 2020

Bellamy first appeared as a census designated place in the 2010 U.S. census.

=== 2020 census ===
Bellamy CDP, Alabama – Racial and ethnic composition Note: the US Census treats Hispanic/Latino as an ethnic category. This table excludes Latinos from the racial categories and assigns them to a separate category. Hispanics/Latinos may be of any race.
Race / Ethnicity (NH = Non-Hispanic)	Pop 2010	Pop 2020	% 2010	% 2020
White alone (NH)	45	32	8.29%	8.82%
Black or African American alone (NH)	486	321	89.50%	88.43%
Native American or Alaska Native alone (NH)	0	0	0.00%	0.00%
Asian alone (NH)	5	0	0.92%	0.00%
Native Hawaiian or Pacific Islander alone (NH)	0	0	0.00%	0.00%
Other race alone (NH)	0	0	0.00%	0.00%
Mixed race or Multiracial (NH)	0	7	0.00%	1.93%
Hispanic or Latino (any race)	7	3	1.29%	0.83%
Total	543	363	100.00%	100.00%

As of the 2010 United States census, there were 543 people living in the CDP. The racial makeup of the CDP was 89.5% Black, 8.3% White and 0.9% Asian. 1.3% were Hispanic or Latino of any race.
