= Hamburg, Alabama =

Unincorporated community in Brownsville, Alabama

- Unincorporated community
- Location within Alabama Location within the United States
- Coordinates: 32°31′40″N 87°17′11″W
- Country: United States
- State: Alabama
- County: Perry
- Elevation: 223 ft (68 m)
- Time zone: UTC-6 (Central (CST))
  - Summer (DST): UTC-5 (CDT)
- Area code: 334
- GNIS feature ID: 119621

Hamburg, also known as Hamburgh or Hamburg Station, is an unincorporated community in Perry County, Alabama, United States. A post office operated under the name Hamburg from 1833 to 1941.

== Demographics ==
Historical population
Census	Pop.	Note	%±
1850	92		—
U.S. Decennial Census

Hamburg appeared on the 1850 U.S. Census as an incorporated town. It had a population of 92. Of those 92, it had 46 black and 46 white residents. Forty five of the forty six black residents were slaves and 1 was free. This was the only time Hamburg appeared on the census rolls. Although it was mentioned on the 1870 census, its population was not separately returned from its precinct.

== Notable person ==
- Mary Ward Brown, novelist
