= Browns, Alabama =

Unincorporated community in Alabama, United States

- Unincorporated community
- Location in Alabama Browns (the United States)
- Coordinates: 32°26′12″N 87°21′58″W
- Country: United States
- State: Alabama
- County: Dallas
- Elevation: 171 ft (52 m)
- Time zone: UTC-6 (Central (CST))
  - Summer (DST): UTC-5 (CDT)
- Area code: 334
- GNIS feature ID: 115005

Browns is an unincorporated community in Dallas County, Alabama. Browns formerly had one site included on the National Register of Historic Places, St. Luke's Episcopal Church, before it was removed to Cahaba in 2006. It is home to a community airport.
