= Bradburia hirtella =

Scientific classification
- Kingdom: Plantae
- Clade: Tracheophytes
- Clade: Angiosperms
- Clade: Eudicots
- Clade: Asterids
- Order: Asterales
- Family: Asteraceae
- Genus: Bradburia
- Species: B. hirtella

Binomial name
- Bradburia hirtella Torr. & A.Gray 1842

Synonyms
- Bradburia schottii Millsp.; Chrysopsis texana (Torr. & A.Gray) G.L.Nesom; Mauchia hirtella (Torr. & A.Gray) Kuntze

Species of flowering plant

Bradburia hirtella is a North American species of flowering plants in the family Asteraceae, native to Texas and Louisiana in the south-central United States.

Bradburia hirtella is typically annual, with some populations perennial. It is a herb up to 80 cm (32 inches) tall with yellow flower heads. Disc florets are functionally male, the female parts being fertile only in the ray florets.
