= Cross Timbers =

Ecoregion in Texas, Oklahoma, and Kansas

Coordinates: 34°00′N 97°15′W

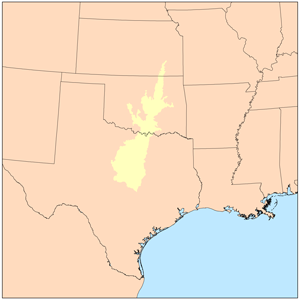
- The outline of the Cross Timbers as defined by the EPA

Ecology
- Realm: Nearctic
- Biome: Central forest-grasslands transition
- Borders: List: Central Great Plains; Flint Hills; Central Irregular Plains; Arkansas Valley (ecoregion); Texas Blackland Prairies

Geography
- Country: United States
- States: Texas; Oklahoma; Kansas

The term Cross Timbers, also known as Ecoregion 29, Central Oklahoma/Texas Plains, is used to describe a strip of land in the United States that runs from southeastern Kansas across Central Oklahoma to Central Texas. Made up of a mix of prairie, savanna, and woodland, it forms part of the boundary between the more heavily forested eastern country and the almost treeless Great Plains, and also marks the western habitat limit of many mammals and insects.

No major metropolitan areas lie wholly within the Cross Timbers, although roughly the western half of the Dallas-Fort Worth Metroplex does, including the cities of Fort Worth, Denton, Arlington, and Weatherford. The western suburbs of the Tulsa metropolitan area and the northeastern suburbs of the Oklahoma City metropolitan area also lie within this area. The main highways that cross the region are I-35 and I-35W going north to south (although they tend to skirt the Cross Timbers' eastern fringe south of Fort Worth), and both I-40 and I-44 going east to west. Numerous U.S. Highways also cross the area. I-35 means a portion of Austin and Travis County is also included in the Cross Timbers.

== As an ecoregion ==
The Cross Timbers are defined by the United States Environmental Protection Agency as Ecoregion 29, a Level III ecoregion. Some organizations and maps refer to the Cross Timbers ecoregion as the Central Oklahoma/Texas Plains. The Cross Timbers are contained within the WWF central forest-grasslands transition ecoregion.

The woodland and savanna portions of the Cross Timbers are mainly post oak and blackjack oak on coarse, sandy soils; fire suppression in recent years has increased forest density and allowed eastern redcedar to invade as well. The short, stout oaks that grow in the Cross Timbers were not usable as timber, and those that were not cleared for farmland constitute one of the least disturbed forest types in the eastern United States, with some 890,000 acres (3,600 km^{2}) of old-growth forest scattered throughout the region. These old-growth forests contain millions of post oak from 200 to 400 years old and red cedar over 500 years old. The prairie portions are chiefly tallgrass on finer, dry soils. Overall, the Cross Timbers are not as arable as the surrounding ecoregions. Today, land use is a mixture of rangeland, pastures, and farmland. The area has also been an important site of oil extraction for over 80 years.

Geologically speaking, the Cross Timbers are underlain by Pennsylvanian and Cretaceous-era sandstone and limestone that has been moderately dissected, giving the region a gently to moderately rolling topography, including some cuestas. Although local relief is relatively low, it is generally greater than that in the surrounding ecoregions, although this is not the case with the Flint Hills in Kansas.

Ecologically, the EPA includes the Cross Timbers as part of the vast Great Plains, which comprise Level I Ecoregion 9.0, stretching from central Alberta in Canada to northern Mexico. More specifically, the Cross Timbers fall into Level II Ecoregion 9.4, the smaller South Central Semi-Arid Plains. In southern Oklahoma, the Cross Timbers are located on the very edge of the Great Plains, as they border directly parts of Level I Ecoregion 8.0, the Eastern Temperate Forests; elsewhere, the Cross Timbers are separated slightly from the Eastern Temperate Forests. In turn, the Cross Timbers are themselves subdivided into nine Level IV Ecoregions:

=== 29a: Northern Cross Timbers ===
This is a wide belt of land stretching from south-central Oklahoma into southeastern Kansas and is the only part of the Cross Timbers that extends into Kansas. In that state, it covers eastern Chautauqua and Elk counties and smaller portions of Greenwood, Woodson, Wilson, and Montgomery counties, while in Oklahoma, this region covers all of Seminole, Pottawatomie, and Okfuskee counties, large parts of Osage, Lincoln, Creek, Oklahoma, Cleveland, Pontotoc, Hughes, McIntosh, and Okmulgee counties, and smaller parts of Logan, Garvin, Murray, Pawnee, Tulsa, Wagoner, and Washington counties. The towns of Sand Springs, Sapulpa, Ada, and Shawnee, Oklahoma fall within this large area; Bartlesville and Okmulgee lie on the eastern edge.

=== 29b: Eastern Cross Timbers ===
In Oklahoma, this belt of woodland covers all of Marshall County and parts of Love, Carter, Johnston, and Bryan counties, but in Texas, this region exists as a long, very narrow strip of dense forest stretching from the Red River to just north of Waco, Texas. It passes through northwestern Grayson County, eastern Cooke, Denton and Tarrant counties, central Johnson County, western Hill County, and northern McLennan County. The city of Arlington, Texas lies within this zone, and Denton and Cleburne are on its eastern edge.

=== 29c: Western Cross Timbers ===
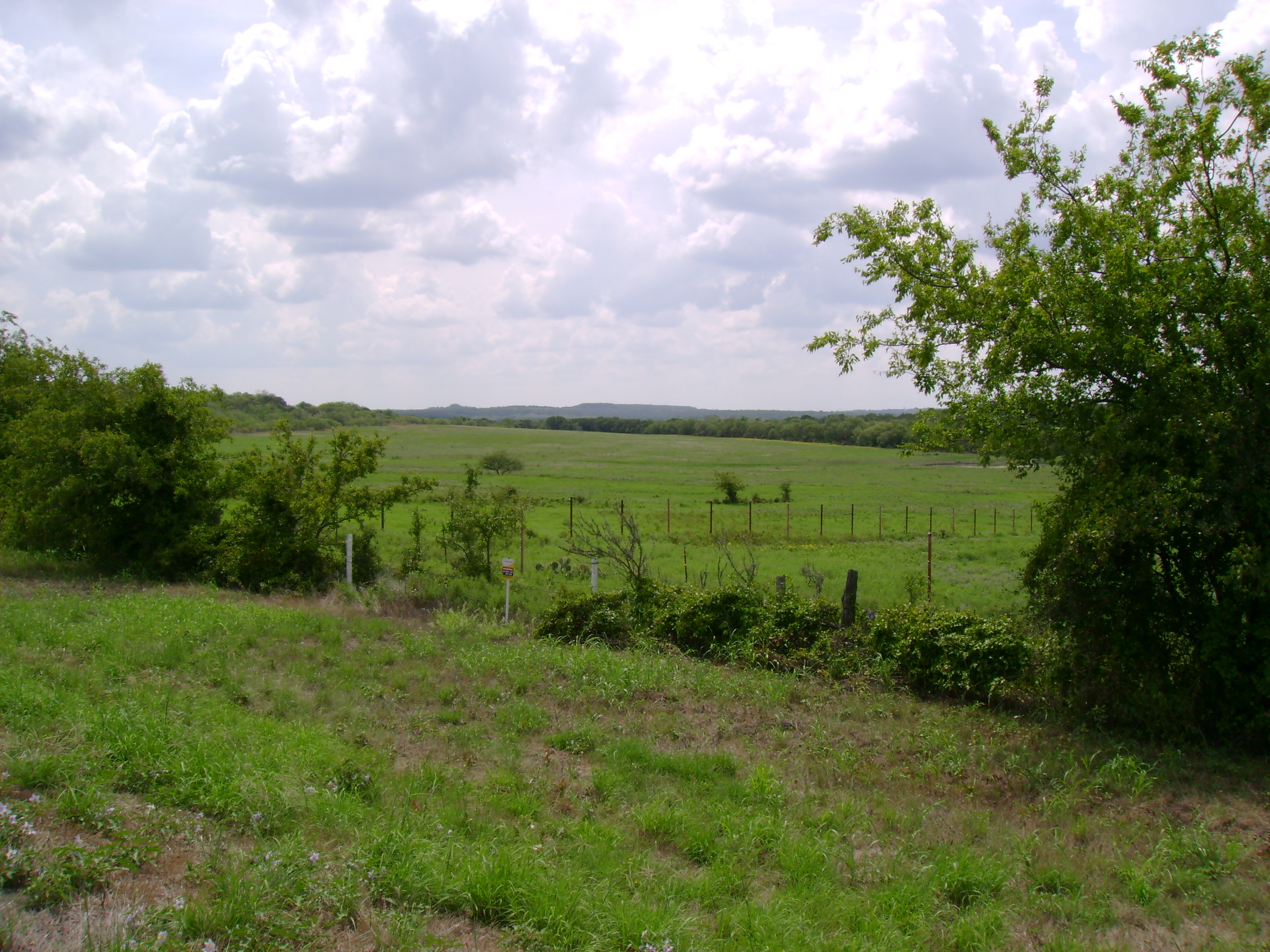
A landscape in eastern Jack County, Texas, typical of the Western Cross Timbers

A much wider band than the Eastern Cross Timbers, the Western Cross Timbers band extends from far southern Oklahoma, including parts of Love and Carter counties, into central Texas, where it covers large parts of Montague, Young, Jack, Wise, Stephens, Palo Pinto, Parker, Eastland, Erath, Brown, San Saba, and Mills counties, as well as smaller parts of Clay, Cooke, Callahan, Hood, Coleman, and McCulloch counties. In Texas, this area includes the towns of Weatherford and Mineral Wells; Stephenville lies on the eastern fringe, while Brownwood is on the western edge.

The part of this region north of I-20 is sometimes colloquially referred to as the Palo Pinto Mountains; the hills are isolated, rugged, and scenic, with spectacular bluffs along the Brazos River as it flows through the region.

Coal mining has historically been an important activity, as bituminous coal deposits are found throughout the region; indeed, the town of Newcastle in Young County was named after the English city of the same name due to the coal connection.

In the mid-to-late 19th century, Comanche Indians occupied this area, and it became a flash point for conflict between various groups of white settlers, the Comanche, and the U.S. Cavalry; Forts Belknap and Richardson were built in the area to protect this part of the frontier.

Numerous roads cross this region, including US 70 in Oklahoma and I-20, I-30, US 67, US 81, US 82, US 180, US 183, US 281, US 287, and US 380 in Texas.

=== 29d: Grand Prairie ===
A fairly narrow strip dividing the Eastern and Western Cross Timbers, the Grand Prairie differs in physiography, topography, and land use from both of these, as it is much more nearly level and better suited to agriculture. It includes a small part of Love County, Oklahoma (the only part of this region outside of Texas) and passes south through western Cooke County, eastern Wise County, and western Denton, Tarrant, and Johnson counties, and also includes parts of Parker, Erath, Hood, Somervell, Hill, and McLennan counties. This region contains the cities of Fort Worth, Granbury and Denton, although Denton lies on the border with the Eastern Cross Timbers. I-35 and I-35W cross north to south, while US 82, US 380, I-30, I-20, US 377, and US 67 cross east to west; US 81 and US 287 also cross southwest to northeast.

=== 29e: Limestone Cut Plains ===
A broader, southern extension of the Grand Prairie, found only in Texas; it is underlain by limestone rather than sandstone, and serves as a physiological and vegetational transition to the Edwards Plateau, which it borders to the south. All of Hamilton and Coryell counties, large parts of Bell, Lampasas, Mills, Erath, and Bosque counties, and smaller parts of Williamson, Burnet, Brown, Comanche, Hood, Somervell, and McLennan counties, including the towns of Killeen, Copperas Cove, and Lampasas as well as the Fort Cavazos Army base, fall within this region. Among the few major roads that cross the Limestone Cut Plains are US 281 north to south and US 84 east to west.

=== 29f: Carbonate Cross Timbers ===
This ecoregion exists as an enclave within the Western Cross Timbers, stretching from southern Jack County, Texas across northwestern Palo Pinto County into eastern Stephens County, as well as tiny parts of Young and Eastland counties. The region features a limestone substrate as opposed to sandstone, and has greater topographical relief and denser and different vegetation than other parts of the Cross Timbers. No towns of any size lie within this area, although Possum Kingdom Lake and State Park do; the region is crossed by US 180 and Texas State Highway 16.

=== 29g: Arbuckle Uplift ===
Covering a fairly small area in south-central Oklahoma and underlain by a unique mosaic of several different minerals, this region includes the town of Ardmore.

=== 29h: Northwestern Cross Timbers ===
An extension in two branches of the Cross Timbers into southwestern Oklahoma, this area features reduced tree density and height, but also small forests dominated by sugar maple, bur oak, and live oak in deeper river canyons. The towns of Duncan, Oklahoma and Walters, Oklahoma, lie in this region.

=== 29i: Arbuckle Mountains ===
The Arbuckle Mountains are located in a small area nestled in between regions 29g and h; it is made of folded, rather than dissected, limestone, sandstone, and dolomite, and features the greatest topographical relief of the entire Cross Timbers, though not the highest elevations. The landscape includes many caves, sinkholes, springs, and streams. I-35 crosses this region north to south.

== Climatology ==
Part of the difference in the Cross Timbers region and the surrounding regions west (drier) and east (wetter) has to do with the dry line which separates humid air from the Gulf of Mexico from the dry air of the Llano Estacado, the Texas Panhandle, and the High Plains.

== History ==
The thick growth formed an almost impenetrable barrier for early American explorers and travelers. Washington Irving, in 1835, described it as "like struggling through forests of cast iron." Rachel Plummer, while a captive of the Comanche in 1836, described it as "a range of timber-land from the waters of Arkansas, bearing a southwest direction, crossing the False Ouachita, Red River, the heads of Sabine, Angelina, Natchitoches, Trinity, Brazos, Colorado...the range of timber is of an irregular width, say 5 to 35 miles wide...abounding with small prairies, skirted with timber of various kinds — oak, of every description, ash, elm, hickory, walnut and mulberry...the purest atmosphere I ever breathed was that of these regions." Josiah Gregg described the Cross Timbers in 1845 as varying in width from five to thirty miles and attributed their denseness to the continual burning of the prairies.

The Cross Timbers vary in width from five to thirty miles, and entirely cut off the communication betwixt the interior prairies and those of the great plains. They may be considered as the "fringe" of the great prairies, being a continuous brushy strip, composed of various kinds of undergrowth; such as black-jack, post-oaks, and in some places hickory, elm, etc., intermixed with a very diminutive dwarf oak, called by the hunters, "shin-oak." Most of the timber appears to be kept small by the continual inroads of the "burning prairies;" for, being killed almost annually, it is constantly replaced by scions of undergrowth; so that it becomes more and more dense every reproduction. In some places, however, the oaks are of considerable size, and able to withstand the conflagrations. The Underwood is so matted in many places with grapevines, green-briars, etc., as to form almost impenetrable "roughs," which serve as hiding-places for wild beasts, as well as wild Indians; and would, in savage warfare, prove almost as formidable as the hammocks of Florida.

— Josiah Gregg

Robert Neighbors and Rip Ford reached the "Cross Timbers, two parallel strips of timber region that ran down the middle of Texas", in 1849 while blazing an emigrant trail from Austin to El Paso.

== See also ==
- Dry line
- History of Texas forests

== Bibliography ==
- Francaviglia, Richard V. The Cast Iron Forest: A Natural and Cultural History of the North American Cross Timbers. University of Texas Press, 2000. ISBN 0-292-72515-9
- Gregg, Josiah. "The Cross Timbers". Commerce of the Prairies. 1845. V. II, Ch. 10, pp. 199–201. (accessed June 19, 2007: hosted by The Kansas Collection)
- Hoagland, B. W.; Butler, I. H.; Johnson, F. L.; Glenn, S. (1999). "The Cross Timbers". In Anderson, Roger C.; Fralish, James S.; Baskin, Jerry M. (eds.). Savannas, Barrens and Rock Outcrop Communities of North America. Cambridge: Cambridge University Press. pp. 231–245. ISBN 052157322X.
- Irving, Washington. A Tour on the Prairies, Chapter XXI. 1835.
- Johnson, Neil R. (ed. C. Neil Kingsley). The Chickasaw Rancher. University Press of Colorado, 2001. ISBN 978-0-87081-635-2
- McLeran, Vic. The Cooper's Hawk: A Cross Timbers Chronicle. Philadelphia: Xlibris Corporation, 2000. ISBN 0-7388-5935-4 and ISBN 0-7388-5934-6
