= Alabama State Route 55 =

State highway in Alabama, United States

State Route 55

Route information
- Maintained by ALDOT
- Length: 58.758 mi (94.562 km)
- Existed: 1940–present

Major junctions
- South end: SR 85 at the Florida state line in Florala
- US 331 in Florala; US 29 in Andalusia; US 84 in Andalusia; US 31 in Mckenzie
- North end: I-65 / SR 106 in Georgiana

Location
- Country: United States
- State: Alabama
- Counties: Covington, Conecuh, Butler

Highway system
- Alabama State Highway System; Interstate; US; State
← SR 54	→ SR 56

State Route 55 (SR 55) is a 58.758-mile-long (94.562 km) state highway in the southern part of the U.S. state of Alabama. The southern terminus of the highway is at the Florida state line, where the highway continues as Florida State Road 85 (SR 85). The northern terminus of the highway is at an intersection with SR 106 at Georgiana in southern Butler County.

== Route description ==
SR 55 is a continuation of a route heading northward from Fort Walton Beach and Crestview, Florida. It enters the state at the border town of Florala, where it continues as Florida State Road 85. As the highway heads towards Andalusia, it travels through the Conecuh National Forest.

The highway intersects US 29/US 84 at Andalusia, forming a brief wrong-way concurrency, as southbound US 29 shares the same roadway as northbound SR 55, as well as westbound US 84. SR 55 and US 84 are concurrent as they lead northwesterly from Andalusia. At the small community of River Falls, SR 55 splits from US 84 and heads northward towards McKenzie, where it joins with US 31. Just south of Georgiana, US 31 splits from the route which continues to its terminus at SR 106, which connects with Interstate 65 (I-65).

The route is now a four-lane highway from its intersection with US 29 just south of Andalusia northward to its terminus with SR 106 and Interstate 65 near Georgiana.

This highway is increasing in popularity with travelers headed to the Fort Walton/Destin area.

== History ==
From its creation in 1928, S.R. 55 has been extremely important to the infrastructure of Alabama. From 1934 to 1955, its routing from McKenzie to Andalusia was also a portion of U.S. Route 84. U.S. 84 was rerouted onto a shorter, much more direct route from Evergreen to Andalusia in 1955.

In 1978, S.R. 55 was rerouted onto a new, much less curvy highway from McKenzie to Andalusia, bypassing Red Level - this new routing was a four-lane highway. In the mid-2000s, a bypass of Georgiana - home to its junction with SR-106 - was constructed. This new routing would junction with SR-106 west of Georgiana, continuing west to its junction with Interstate 65 - its present-day junction with the Interstate.

On the other hand, its routing south of Andalusia has remained relatively unchanged, with the only major change to the routing being the addition of a bypass of downtown Andalusia in 1995 - thus making SR-55 through Andalusia a Truck-and-Business route complex.

== Major intersections ==
County	Location	mi	km	Destinations	Notes
Covington	Florala	0.000	0.000	SR 85 south – Crestview, Destin	Florida state line
Covington	Florala	0.828	1.333	US 331 south (SR 9) to SR 54 east – Samson, Panama City	South end of US 331/SR 9 concurrency
Covington	Florala	1.051	1.691	US 331 north (Sixth Street / SR 9) – Opp, Montgomery, Florala Municipal Airport	North end of US 331/SR 9 concurrency
Covington	Andalusia	23.539	37.882	Stanley Avenue (SR 15 north) – Andalusia	South end of SR 15 concurrency
Covington	Andalusia	25.449	40.956	US 29 south (SR 15) – Brewton	North end of SR 15 concurrency; south end of US 29 concurrency
Covington	Andalusia	28.149	45.301	US 29 north / US 84 east (M.L. King Jr. Expressway / SR 12) – Opp, LBW Community College Andalusia Campus	North end of US 29 concurrency; south end of US 84/SR 12 concurrency
Covington	River Falls	31.449	50.612	US 84 west (SR 12) to I-65 south – Evergreen, Conecuh County	North end of US 84/SR 12 concurrency
Conecuh	No major junctions				
Butler	McKenzie	49.431	79.551	US 31 south (SR 3) / South Garland Road – Evergreen, Conecuh County, McKenzie	South end of US 31/SR 3 concurrency
Butler		53.741	86.488	US 31 (SR 3) – Greenville	North end of US 31/SR 3 concurrency
Butler	Georgiana	57.275	92.175	SR 106 east – Brantley	South end of SR 106 concurrency
Butler	Georgiana	58.758	94.562	I-65 / SR 106 west – Mobile, Montgomery	Northern terminus; I-65 exit 114
1.000 mi = 1.609 km; 1.000 km = 0.621 mi: Concurrency terminus

== See also ==
- List of highways numbered 55
