= Alabama State Route 263 =

Highway in Alabama

State Route 263

Route information
- Maintained by ALDOT
- Length: 15.132 mi (24.353 km)

Major junctions
- South end: SR 185 north of Greenville
- North end: SR 21 in Braggs

Location
- Country: United States
- State: Alabama
- Counties: Butler, Lowndes

Highway system
- Alabama State Highway System; Interstate; US; State
← SR 261	→ SR 265

State Route 263 (SR 263) is a 15-mile-long (24 km) route that serves as a connection between SR 185 northwest of Greenville in Fort Dale with SR 21 at Braggs.

== Route description ==
The northern terminus of SR 263 is located at its intersection with SR 21 in Braggs. The route then takes a southeasterly track to its southern terminus at SR 185 in Fort Dale to the northwest of Greenville.

== Major intersections ==
County	Location	mi	km	Destinations	Notes
Butler	Fort Dale	0.000	0.000	SR 185 (Fort Dale Road) to I-65 – Greenville, Fort Deposit	Southern terminus
Lowndes	Braggs	15.132	24.353	SR 21 – Oak Hill, Hayneville	Northern terminus; road continues north as Lowndes County Road 7 (CR 7)
1.000 mi = 1.609 km; 1.000 km = 0.621 mi
