= Fort Bibb =

United States historic site in Alabama

- Pine Flat, Alabama in United States
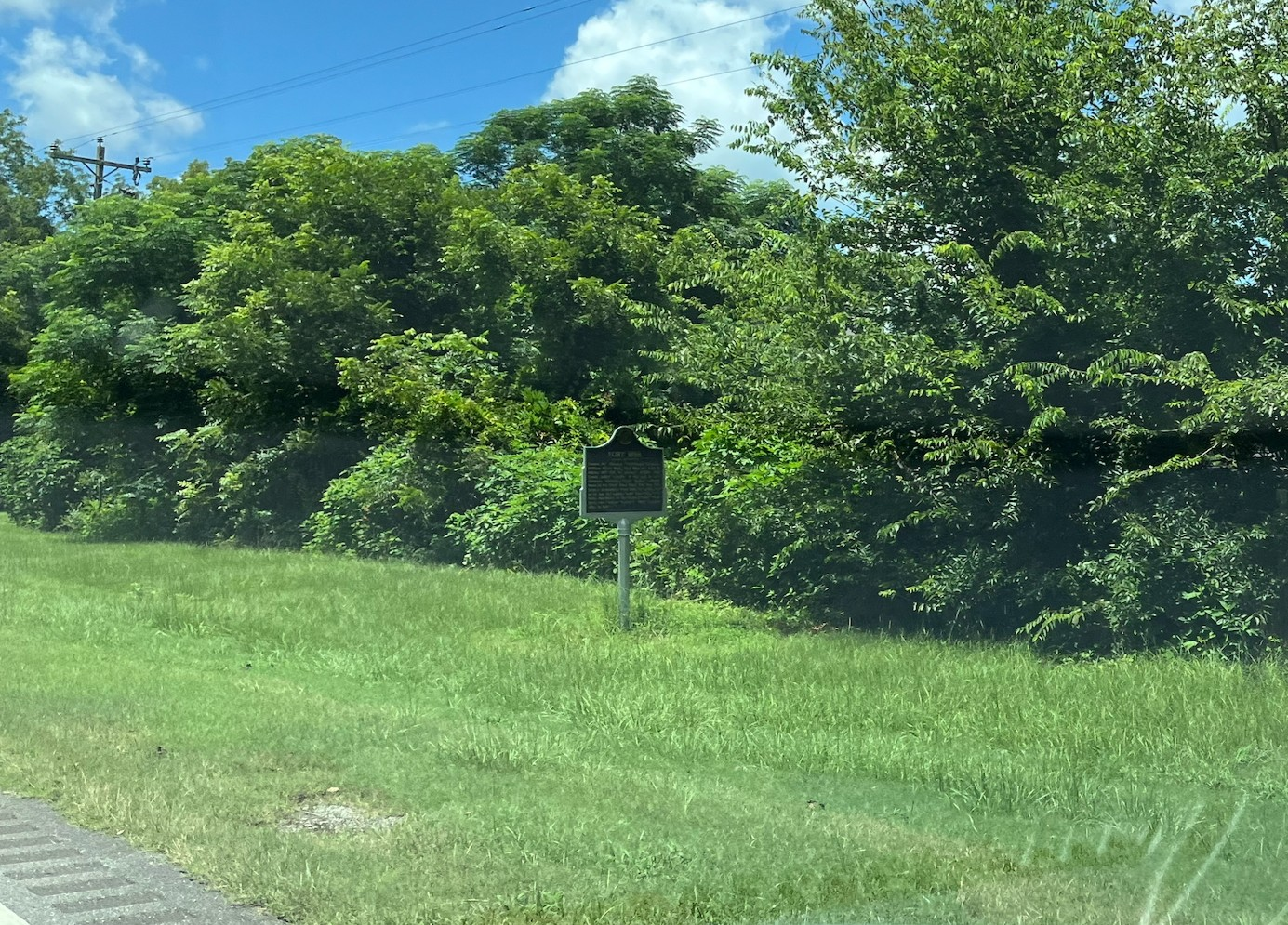
- Fort Bibb Historical Marker along Alabama State Route 10

Site information
- Type: Stockade fort
- Owner: Private
- Controlled by: Private
- Open to the public: No

Location
- Location within Alabama Location within the United States
- Coordinates: 31°50′20″N 86°53′00″W

Site history
- Built: Early 1818
- Built by: Alabama Territory settlers
- In use: 1818-?

Fort Bibb was a stockade fort built in present-day Butler County, Alabama during the First Seminole War.

== History ==
After the Ogly Massacre, many of the settlers in the surrounding area began to build protective stockades around their homes. Fort Bibb was first constructed in early 1818 and was built around the home of Captain James Saffold. The fort was named for William Wyatt Bibb, who was the acting governor of the Alabama Territory. Captain Saffold participated in the Battle of Calebee Creek, and afterwards settled in the area of Pine Flat. Warren A. Thompson and William Butler also settled in Pine Flat.

Colonel Samuel Dale helped to fortify Fort Bibb while he and his militia constructed Fort Dale on the Federal Road in the spring of 1818. Fort Dale was built in response to the murders of Butler, William Gardender and Daniel Shaw. These men, along with Saffold and John Hinson had left Fort Bibb on March 20, 1818 to rendezvous with Colonel Dale. They were attacked by Red Sticks under the command of Savannah Jack. This incident became known as the Butler Massacre. Captain Saffold and three other local men were also killed in the area prior to the construction of Fort Dale. After these killings, soldiers and allied Choctaw warriors were sent from Fort Crawford to assist in the pursuit of the Red Sticks.

Fort Bibb served as one of the first election sites in Butler County.
