= Warren A. Thompson =

American explorer

Warren A. Thompson (May 10, 1802 – July 14, 1891) was a noted explorer and original settler of Butler County, Alabama.

== Explorations ==
Thompson went with Captain John H. Watts and Thomas Hill on their many explorations throughout Butler County, and had the particular honor of naming the many creeks found in the area. He was in Fort Bibb in 1818, and was personally acquainted with Captain William Butler, seeing them off on the morning that they started on their way to Fort Dale.

== Personal life ==
Born in Clarke County, Georgia, Thompson began life under the unusual circumstance of having all of his brothers and sisters taken in by different members of the community in 1807, when his father's unexpected death left the family with no means of support. Thomas Hill took in Warren and adopted him. When Thomas Hill came to Alabama Territory in 1816, he brought the adopted child with him. Warren spent the earlier days of his life driving cattle for his adoptive father until his death in 1821, and remained with his adoptive mother until her death in 1822. He was then grown, though only weighing 98 pounds, but was very strong and tough for his size, able to even throw down Betsy Donaldson, who was quite a noted character for strength at that time. He was employed by Dave Elder as overseer, and remained with him for six years.

He was married on December 19, 1829, to Mary Danvis, whose father Thomas Hayes was so opposed to the marriage that Warren had to steal his bride from the paternal roof at night. The marriage produced nine children, Albert, Mary, James, Arvilla, Franklin, David, Calvin, John, and Pinkney. Supporting such a large family proved tough, and after Warren gave up farming in order to have his family live in a more healthful location, he spent his time as captain of a company in the county, and joined the Primitive Baptists in 1840.
