= Alabama State Route 185 =

State highway in Alabama, United States

State Route 185

Route information
- Maintained by ALDOT
- Length: 23.129 mi (37.223 km)

Major junctions
- South end: US 31 south of Greenville
- SR 10 in Greenville; I-65 in Greenville and Fort Deposit
- North end: US 31 in Fort Deposit

Location
- Country: United States
- State: Alabama
- Counties: Butler, Lowndes

Highway system
- Alabama State Highway System; Interstate; US; State
← SR 184	→ SR 186

State Route 185 (SR 185) is a 23.129-mile (37.223 km) state highway that serves as a north–south connection between Greenville and Fort Deposit. SR 185 intersects US 31 at both its southern and northern termini.

== Route description ==
SR 185 begins at its intersection with US 31 south of Greenville. From this point, the route continues in a northerly track where it intersects SR 10 just west of the Greenville central business district. SR 185 continues north through the city and intersects both SR 245 and I-65 at Exit 130 prior to leaving the city limits. From this point, the route continues in its northerly track and intersects SR 263 en route to Fort Deposit. SR 185 then reorients in an easterly direction at Fort Deposit and continues its course where it again intersects I-65 (Exit 142) prior to reaching its northern terminus at US 31.

== Major intersections ==
County	Location	mi	km	Destinations	Notes
Butler		0.0	0.0	US 31 (Mobile Road/SR 3) – Georgiana, Montgomery	Southern terminus
Butler	Greenville	3.650	5.874	SR 10 (W Commerce Street) – Pine Apple, Luverne	
Butler	Greenville	5.133	8.261	SR 245 south (Greenville Bypass) – Mac Crenshaw Memorial Airport	Northern terminus of SR 245
Butler	Greenville	5.294	8.520	I-65 – Montgomery, Mobile	I-65 Exit 130
Butler	Fort Dale	7.614	12.254	SR 263 north (Braggs Road)	Southern terminus of SR 263
Lowndes	Fort Deposit	20.7	33.3	I-65 – Montgomery, Mobile	I-65 Exit 142
Lowndes		23.129	37.223	US 31 (Montgomery Highway/SR 3) – Montgomery, Greenville	Northern terminus
1.000 mi = 1.609 km; 1.000 km = 0.621 mi

== Greenville truck route ==
State Route 185 Truck
- Location: Greenville
- Length: 8.002 mi (12.878 km)

Alabama State Route 185 Truck (SR 10 Truck) is a truck route of SR 185 around downtown Greenville. The highway runs 8.002 miles (12.878 km) between SR 185's southern terminus and US 31 on the south side of town to SR 185 and SR 10 Truck north of the community. The truck route allows large vehicles to bypass the roundabout at the county courthouse downtown.

The entire route is in Greenville, Butler County.

mi	km	Destinations	Notes
0.000	0.000	US 31 south (Mobile Road) / SR 185 north (Aztec Road) – Mobile, Greenville	Southern terminus; south end of US 31 overlap
4.814	7.747	US 31 north (Montgomery Highway) / SR 10 east (Luverne Highway) – Montgomery, Luverne	North end of US 31 overlap; south end of SR 10 overlap
5.416	8.716	SR 10 west (East Commerce Street) – Greenville, Camden	North end of SR 10 overlap; south end of SR 10 Truck / SR 245 overlap; eastern terminus of SR 10 Truck; southern terminus of SR 245
8.002	12.878	SR 185 / SR 10 Truck north (Fort Dale Road) to I-65	Northern terminus; north end of SR 10 Truck / SR 245 overlap; northern terminus of SR 245
1.000 mi = 1.609 km; 1.000 km = 0.621 mi: Concurrency terminus
