= Alabama State Route 245 =

State highway in Alabama, United States

State Route 245

Route information
- Maintained by ALDOT
- Length: 2.586 mi (4.162 km)

Major junctions
- South end: SR 10 in Greenville
- North end: SR 185 in Greenville

Location
- Country: United States
- State: Alabama
- Counties: Butler

Highway system
- Alabama State Highway System; Interstate; US; State
← SR 243	→ SR 247

State Route 245 (SR 245) is a 3-mile-long (4.8 km) route that serves as a bypass to the northeast of Greenville between SR 10 and SR 185.

== Route description ==
The southern terminus of SR 245 is located at its intersection with SR 10 to the east of downtown Greenville. From this point, the route travels in a northwesterly direction to its northern terminus at its intersection with SR 185 to the north of downtown Greenville.

== Major intersections ==
The entire route is in Greenville, Butler County.

mi	km	Destinations	Notes
0.000	0.000	SR 10 (E Commerce Street) – Downtown, Pine Apple, Luverne	Southern terminus
1.36	2.19	Airport Road - Mac Crenshaw Memorial Airport	
2.586	4.162	SR 185 (Fort Dale Road) to I-65 – Downtown, Fort Deposit	Northern terminus
1.000 mi = 1.609 km; 1.000 km = 0.621 mi
