= Robert W. Lee IV =

American minister, author, and columnist

- Born: Robert Wright Lee IV; September 14, 1992 (age 33); Statesville, Iredell County, North Carolina, U.S.
- Education: Appalachian State University; Duke University; Pacific School of Religion
- Occupations: Minister, author, columnist, activist
- Years active: 2017–Present
- Spouse: Stephanie Lee
- Relatives: William Lee (4th-great grandfather)
- Website: roblee4.com

Robert Wright Lee IV is an American Protestant minister, activist, author, and newspaper columnist.

== Early life and education ==
Lee was born and raised in Statesville, North Carolina, United States. He was baptized at Broad Street United Methodist Church in Statesville, and was raised in the United Methodist faith. He completed his undergraduate studies at Appalachian State University in Boone, where he majored in Appalachian studies and religious studies. In 2017, he received a Master of Theological Studies degree from Duke Divinity School in Durham. While at Duke, Lee had an academic concentration in practical theology and homiletics. In December 2023, Lee completed a Doctor of Ministry degree from Pacific School of Religion. His dissertation was on faith and the American presidency.

Through his father, Robert W. Lee III, Lee is a direct lineal descendant of Robert Scothrup Lee, a Confederate States Army veteran and farmer from Butler County, Alabama. His great-great-great-great-grandfather, William Lee, was a pioneer in early Alabama politics, having served in the Alabama State Legislature and as a court judge after immigrating to the United States from England. Journalists from Axios who have reviewed Lee's private genealogy records have stated that Lee is a collateral descendant of Confederate General Robert E. Lee.

In 2016, while an intern at Edenton Street United Methodist Church in Raleigh, North Carolina, he submitted an Op-Ed piece to the "Act of Faith" section of The Washington Post. In it, he wrote that he was "related to the Lees of Virginia." The following summer, Lee appeared at the televised MTV Awards show at the LA Forum and announced that he was "a descendant of Robert E. Lee." In 2019, he published a paperback autobiography in which he states that his grandmother, "Nana," told him when he was a child sitting on her knee: "See that painting over there, the one of General Lee on the horse? You are related to him, a nephew separated by many generations." Since his appearance on the MTV Video Music Awards on August 27, 2017, he has become known for his efforts to "especially challenge white Christians in America to take seriously the deadly legacy of slavery." Following a backlash from some parishioners after the appearance, Lee announced that he was stepping down from the pulpit of the Bethany United Church of Christ in Winston-Salem.

== Activism ==
On June 4, 2020, Lee was invited by Virginia governor Ralph Northam to speak at a televised press conference in support of Northam's desire to remove Lee's equestrian statue from Monument Avenue in Richmond. Northam introduced Lee with the statement that "we have been talking about his great-grandfather." Lee replied that he was Robert E. Lee's nephew, "so many greats removed of course." Lee explained his stance on removal of the statue, stating that while there are more important things to address than statues, "the monument has become an idol for many to the Lost Cause."

On June 7, 2020, Lee published an opinion piece in The Washington Post calling for the replacement of the mythology of the Lost Cause. On July 21, 2020, Lee testified before a House Subcommittee on National Parks, Forests, and Public Lands in regards to a statue of Robert E. Lee.

== Investigation by media ==
On May 14, 2021, The Washington Post "Fact Checker" examined historical and genealogical records and determined that Lee is the direct descendant of Confederate Private Robert S. Lee of Alabama, and further concluded "the pastor should not state he is related to Robert E. Lee, especially in legal filings — and news organizations should not echo this claim." Their conclusions were based on finding no evidence the Lee is a direct descendant of Robert E. Lee's older brother, Charles Carter Lee, stating that Lee had made this claim when appearing in Tulsa, Oklahoma, in January 2020, and not on analysis of his other paternal lines, or any of his maternal lines. On February 1, 2022, CNN cited an Axios report which stated that Lee was in fact a "a close and multiple cousin" of General Robert E. Lee. The report linking Lee to Charles Carter Lee directly was originally published in the Tulsa World on January 17, 2020, before Lee's event there. It stated that Lee was a direct descendant of Charles Carter Lee, but did not quote or attribute this to Lee. On November 16, 2021, the Tulsa World corrected its article to remove the reference to a direct descendancy of Lee from Charles Carter Lee as its error and noted that Lee does not make this claim. On February 1, 2022, it was reported that Lee in contradiction with other sources was a collateral descendant of General Robert E. Lee, not direct.

== Published works ==
- Stained Glass Millennials, Smyth and Helwys Publishing, 2017, foreword by United Methodist Bishop William H. Willimon
- A Sin by Any Other Name: Reckoning with Racism and the Heritage of the South, Convergent Books, 2019, foreword by Bernice A. King
- The Pulpit and the Paper: A Pastor's Coming of Age in Newsprint Smyth and Helwys Publishing, 2020, foreword by Chelsea Clinton
- Fostering Hope: A Prayerbook for Foster and Adoptive Families, 2022, Smyth and Helwys Publishing, foreword by Chanequa Walker-Barnes.
- Night Owl Prayers: A Prayerbook, 2024, Smyth and Helwys Publishing, foreword by Gary R. Hall
