= Bolling, Alabama =

Unincorporated community in Alabama, United States

- Unincorporated community
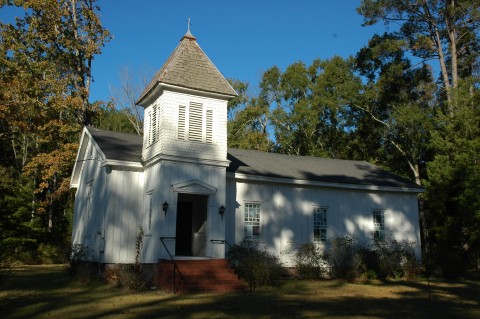
- Bolling Church, 2006

- Location within Alabama Location within the United States
- Coordinates: 31°43′32″N 86°42′21″W
- Country: United States
- State: Alabama
- County: Butler
- Elevation: 328 ft (100 m)
- Time zone: UTC-6 (Central (CST))
  - Summer (DST): UTC-5 (CDT)
- Area code: 334
- GNIS feature ID: 114698

Bolling is an unincorporated community in Butler County, Alabama, United States.

== Location ==
Bolling is 12 miles south of Greenville and 7 miles north of Georgiana on Solomon Hill Road, off U.S. Highway 31. It is near the geographical center of Butler County, with a concrete marker marking the exact center next to the railroad just off Bolling Road.

== History ==
The community was established when the Louisville and Nashville Railroad was built through the pine forest region south of Montgomery. It is commonly believed to have been named for Judge S. J. Bolling of Greenville, Alabama.

John T. Milner and B. C. Milner began building the first structure in the town in 1865, a steam saw-mill. This mill, known locally as Flowers' Mill, began operating in 1866, employing James Flowers as sawyer. W. H. Flowers served as General Superintendent of the mill. At its height, Flowers' Mill produced 35,000 feet of sawed planks per day, most of which was shipped West.

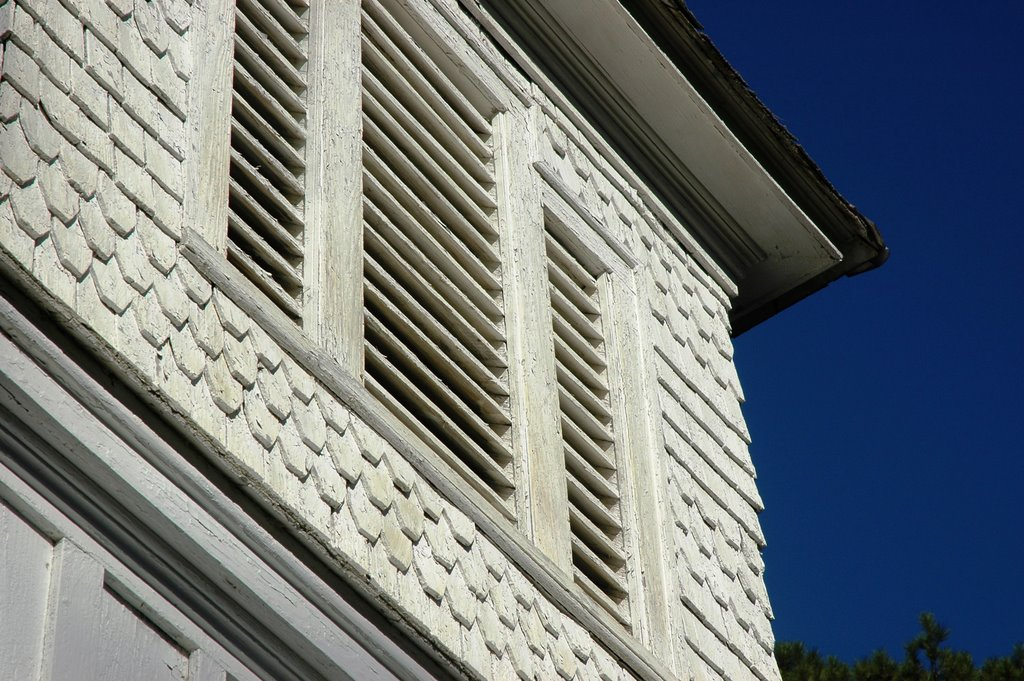
Bolling Church, Fall 2006

The mill supported the construction of a grocery store, post office, and telegraph office in 1873. Bolling School was built by Gulf States Land Sales Co. for the community in 1914. It was touted during its construction as "the most modern two-room school in the state." In addition, the Louisville and Nashville Railroad sponsored the building of the Bolling Depot. After they discontinued passenger service in 1938, the depot was closed and later torn down.

Bolling Church was built in 1888 by W. H. Flowers for the wedding of his daughter. After the wedding, it was donated to the community by the Flowers family and served as a community center, school, and church. Although it was originally a Methodist Episcopal Church, it was used by several denominations. The church, now operated under the auspices of the Bolling Homecoming and Funeral Association, is the only remaining original structure in Bolling, Alabama. It is maintained by the community and former members. It still holds homecoming services every second Sunday in October.

In addition to the Flowers and Milner families, early founding families include the Wrights, Plants, Wesleys, Boggans, Gaffords, Taylors, Parkmans, Mitchells, Hendersons, Byrds, Greens, Faircloths, Popes, Luckies and Ashcrafts.

A post office operated under the name Bolling from 1872 to 1980.

== Demographics ==
Historical population
Census	Pop.	Note	%±
1900	175		—
1910	350		100.0%
1920	146		−58.3%
1930	369		152.7%
U.S. Decennial Census
