= Alabama State Route 106 =

State highway in Alabama, United States

State Route 106

Route information
- Maintained by ALDOT
- Length: 40.819 mi (65.692 km)

Major junctions
- West end: CR 106 at Conecuh–Butler county line
- I-65 at Georgiana; US 31 at Georgiana
- East end: US 29 southwest of Brantley

Location
- Country: United States
- State: Alabama
- Counties: Butler, Crenshaw

Highway system
- Alabama State Highway System; Interstate; US; State
← SR 105	→ SR 107

State Route 106 (SR 106) is a 46-mile-long (74 km) route in the south-central part of the state. The route begins at the Conecuh–Butler County line, serving as a continuation of Conecuh County Road 106 (CR 106). The eastern terminus of the route is at its junction with US 29 southwest of Brantley.

== Route description ==
SR 106 traverses Butler and Crenshaw counties along a two-lane road. As it leads across Butler County, the route travels eastwardly, continuing this trajectory until it crosses into Crenshaw County. After crossing into Crenshaw County, the route turns southeastwardly until it reaches its terminus near Brantley.

== History ==
Between 1962 and 1968, the section of SR 106 between its junctions with I-65 and US 31 saw significant traffic. The temporary northern terminus of the Interstate Highway route was at the interchange with SR 106, and motorists had to use the state route to connect with US 31, which parallels I-65 through Alabama.

== Major intersections ==
County	Location	mi	km	Destinations	Notes
Butler		0.000	0.000	CR 106	Route begins at the county line; western terminus
Butler	Georgiana	9.873	15.889	I-65 / SR 55 begins – Mobile, Montgomery	I-65 exit 114; western end of SR 55 concurrency
Butler	Georgiana	11.356	18.276	SR 55 south – McKenzie, Crestview	Eastern end of SR 55 concurrency; road continues south past Alabama state line as Florida State Road 85
Butler	Georgiana	12.821	20.633	US 31 (Mobile Road/SR 3) – Greenville, McKenzie	
Crenshaw		40.819	65.692	US 29 (Dozier Highway/SR 15) – Brantley, Dozier, Andalusia	Eastern terminus
1.000 mi = 1.609 km; 1.000 km = 0.621 mi: Concurrency terminus
