= Joe Taylor (outfielder) =

American baseball player (1926–1993)

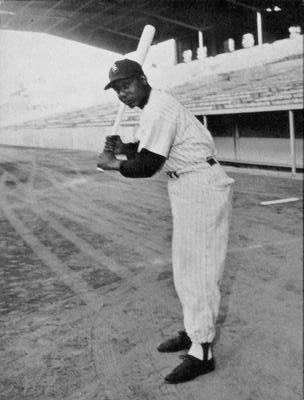
- Outfielder
- Born: March 2, 1926; Chapman, Alabama, U.S.
- Died: March 18, 1993 (aged 67); Pittsburgh, Pennsylvania, U.S.
- Batted: Right Threw: Right

MLB debut
- August 26, 1954, for the Philadelphia Athletics

Last MLB appearance
- July 21, 1959, for the Baltimore Orioles

MLB statistics
- Batting average: .249
- Home runs: 9
- Runs batted in: 31
- Stats at Baseball Reference

Teams
- Philadelphia Athletics (1954); Cincinnati Redlegs (1957); St. Louis Cardinals (1958); Baltimore Orioles (1958–1959)

Joe Cephus Taylor (March 2, 1926 – March 18, 1993) was an American baseball player whose 18-year semi-pro and professional career included 119 games over parts of four seasons in organized Major League Baseball. Born in Chapman, Alabama, and raised in Pittsburgh, he threw and batted right-handed, stood 6 feet 1 inch (1.85 m) tall and weighed 185 pounds (84 kg).

== Baseball career ==
Taylor was a hard-hitting outfielder whose career began in the semipro ranks in 1946. From 1949 to 1951, he played in the Negro leagues, including service with the Chicago American Giants, prior to entering minor league baseball (MiLB) at the Class C level. By 1954, he was an All-Star in the Triple-A International League, hitting .323 with 23 home runs for the Ottawa A's.

The performance earned him a call-up to the American League and the Philadelphia Athletics in August, but Taylor hit only .224 with 13 hits in 18 games during the franchise's waning days in its original home city. He did not make the move to Kansas City with the Athletics, spending 1955 with three clubs at the top levels of the minors. Two strong campaigns and an All-Star selection as a member of the Seattle Rainiers of the Open-Classification Pacific Coast League got him a late-season trial with the 1957 Cincinnati Redlegs. Taylor batted .262 with 28 hits (including four home runs) in 33 games over the final two months of the season, including 24 starts as a corner outfielder. At season's end, however, he was included in a five-player December 5 trade in which the Redlegs, seeking pitching help, sent him and a young future All-Star centerfielder, Curt Flood, to the St. Louis Cardinals for three hurlers.

Taylor began 1958 at Triple-A Omaha before his recall to St. Louis late in May. Playing sparingly, he batted .304 in 23 at bats, largely as a pinch hitter, before he was claimed on waivers by the Baltimore Orioles on July 25. He played in 50 games for Baltimore over two seasons, but batted a composite .239. His last major-league appearance came July 21, 1959, as a pinch hitter against his first-ever MLB team, the Athletics. He then returned to the Triple-A Vancouver Mounties, where he was selected to the Pacific Coast League All-Star team for a second time. He played in the high minors in the United States and Mexico through 1963 before retiring.

Taylor's baseball career was hampered by bouts of alcoholism. In parts of four years with four MLB teams, he batted .249 in 119 games. His 74 career hits included 16 doubles, one triple and nine homers, with 31 runs batted in. In addition, he played for the Leones del Caracas of the Venezuelan Professional Baseball League (VPBL).
