= Tom Morrow (American football) =

American football player (born 1938)

Tommy Morrow
No. 35
- Position: Safety

Personal information
- Born: June 3, 1938; Georgiana, Alabama
- Died: April 4, 2018 (aged 79)
- Listed height: 6 ft 0 in (1.83 m)
- Listed weight: 187 lb (85 kg)

Career information
- College: Southern Miss
- AFL draft: 1962: undrafted

Career history
- Oakland Raiders (1962–1964)

Awards and highlights
- NFL record: Most consecutive games with an interception: 8

Career statistics
- Interceptions: 23
- Interception return yards: 346
- Stats at Pro Football Reference

Tom Morrow (June 3, 1938 – April 4, 2018) was an American football safety who played three years for the Oakland Raiders of the American Football League (AFL). He holds the record for the most consecutive games with an interception, with eight. He played college football at the University of Southern Mississippi.

== See also ==
- Other American Football League players
