= Fort Deposit–Lowndes County Airport =

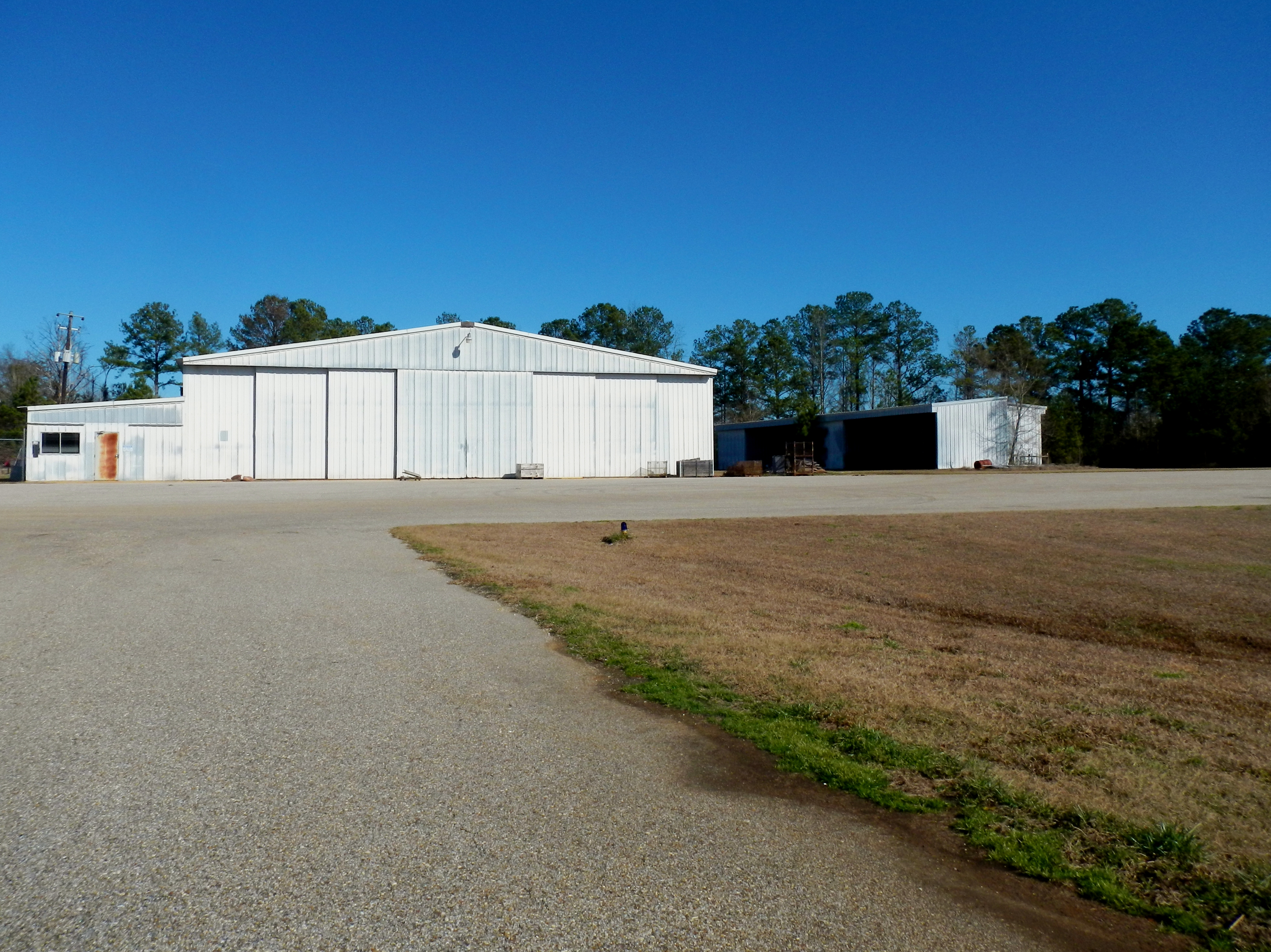
- Fort Deposit–Lowndes County Airport in the winter of 2012
- IATA: none; ICAO: none; FAA LID: 67A

Summary
- Airport type: Public
- Owner: City of Fort Deposit
- Serves: Fort Deposit, Alabama
- Elevation AMSL: 490 ft (150 m)
- Coordinates: 31°58′21″N 086°35′30″W

Map
- Location of airport in Alabama

Runways
Direction	Length		Surface
Direction	ft	m	Surface
15/33	3,593	1,095	Asphalt

Statistics (2010)
- Aircraft operations: 200
- Source: Federal Aviation Administration

Fort Deposit–Lowndes County Airport (FAA LID: 67A) is a city-owned public-use airport located one nautical mile (2 km) southwest of Fort Deposit, a town in Lowndes County, Alabama, United States. The airport is closed indefinitely.

== Facilities and aircraft ==
Fort Deposit–Lowndes County Airport covers an area of 55 acres (22 ha) at an elevation of 490 feet (149 m) above mean sea level. It has one runway designated 15/33 with an asphalt surface measuring 3,593 by 78 feet (1,095 x 24 m). For the 12-month period ending August 19, 2010, the airport had 200 general aviation aircraft operations, an average of 16 per month.

== See also ==
- List of airports in Alabama
