= William Lee (American judge) =

British-born American judge

William Lee was an English-born American politician, military officer, and slaveowner. He served in the War of 1812 and in the Creek War as an officer in the Georgia Volunteer Militia. An early settler of Alabama, Lee attended the convention that drafted the Constitution of Alabama, and served as a member of the Alabama House of Representatives. In 1821 he was appointed as the first judge in Butler County.

== Biography ==
Lee was born in the 1700s in England. He immigrated to the United States and worked as a plantation manager for Joel McClendon in Jones County, Georgia. He was not likely related to the Lee Family of Virginia whose immigrant ancestor Richard Lee I arrived in America around 1639 not the 1700s. Richard Lee I's ancestry in England isn't certain making any connection between him and William Lee dubious. In 1810, on behalf of the plantation owner, Lee posted a notice in the Georgia Journal about a runaway enslaved person. That same year, he served as a witness, alongside Marvelle McClendon, for his employer being granted power of attorney for Mary Partin. In June 1817, he posted another notice searching for a runaway apprentice named Daniel Jefferson McClendon.

Lee moved to the Mississippi Territory and purchased land in Conecuh County (later Butler County) on October 4, 1817. His land would later be part of the Alabama Territory once the western part of the Mississippi territory was granted statehood. He enslaved three black people on his farm.

His wife, likely Penelope McClendon Lee, was of Scottish descent. He had a son, Robert Scothrup Lee.

=== Military career ===
In 1813, Lee served as captain of an infantry company in the Second Regiment of the Georgia Volunteer Militia. He led the company during the Creek War. He had previously served in the army during the War of 1812. He was later promoted to the rank of brigadier general.

On May 20, 1819, Lee was appointed as Major Commandant of the State Militia, 11th Regiment of the 1st Battalion of the Alabama Territory in Conecuh County. In March 1820, he was commissioned as a colonel in the 29th Regiment, Fourth Division, Eighth Brigade of the Alabama Militia.

=== Political career ===
In Alabama, Lee became a judge and played a significant role in early Alabama politics, including helping craft the Constitution of Alabama. In June 1820, he was one of the voters for justices and constables in Captain Jolly's District. In September 1820, he was elected to the House of Representatives in the Alabama Legislature. In August 1820 he managed the election at Fort Dale for Sheriff of Butler County. In 1821 he managed another election at Fort Dale for a senatorial seat that was left vacant after the resignation of Herbert.

On June 14, 1821, Lee was appointed as a judge of the Butler County Court.

=== Later life and death ===
Lee was the first Master of the Hiram Lodge of Masons in Butler County.

Lee died around 1823 and was buried near his residence, three and a half miles east of Fort Dale. The first Masonic demonstration ever made in Butler County sits atop his grave.
