= Wald, Alabama =

Unincorporated community in Alabama, United States

- Unincorporated community
- Location within Alabama Location within the United States
- Coordinates: 31°45′29″N 86°39′56″W
- Country: United States
- State: Alabama
- County: Butler
- Elevation: 390 ft (120 m)
- Time zone: UTC-6 (Central (CST))
  - Summer (DST): UTC-5 (CDT)
- Area code: 334
- GNIS feature ID: 157208

Wald (also Forest) is an unincorporated community in Butler County, Alabama, United States.
