= Chapman, Alabama =

Unincorporated community in Alabama, United States

- Unincorporated community
- Location within Alabama Location within the United States
- Coordinates: 31°40′17″N 86°42′44″W
- Country: United States
- State: Alabama
- County: Butler
- Elevation: 259 ft (79 m)
- Time zone: UTC-6 (Central (CST))
  - Summer (DST): UTC-5 (CDT)
- ZIP code: 36015
- Area code: 334
- GNIS feature ID: 117963

Chapman is an unincorporated community in Butler County, Alabama, United States. Chapman is located on County Route 37, 2.9 miles (4.7 km) west-northwest of Georgiana. Chapman has a post office with ZIP code 36015.

== History ==
Chapman is located on the former Louisville and Nashville Railroad and was founded as a lumber town. It was the headquarters of the W. T. Smith Lumber Company, one of the oldest lumber firms in Alabama. At one point, Chapman contained three sawmills, a veneer mill, a box factory, two barrel factories, and forty-four company houses. The W. T. Smith Company sponsored baseball teams for both white and black workers. Uniforms were provided for both teams, and they were given two-week vacations to play in summer baseball tournaments.

== Demographics ==
Historical population
Census	Pop.	Note	%±
1920	1,142		—
1930	1,189		4.1%
1940	1,167		−1.9%
1950	943		−19.2%
1960	617		−34.6%
U.S. Decennial Census
