= Spring Hill, Butler County, Alabama =

Unincorporated community in Alabama, United States

Spring Hill, Alabama
- Unincorporated community
- Location within Alabama Location within the United States
- Coordinates: 31°52′22″N 86°34′27″W
- Country: United States
- State: Alabama
- County: Butler
- Elevation: 486 ft (148 m)
- Time zone: UTC-6 (Central (CST))
  - Summer (DST): UTC-5 (CDT)
- Area code: 334
- GNIS feature ID: 157093

Spring Hill is an unincorporated community in Butler County, Alabama, United States. Spring Hill is located on U.S. Route 31, 3.9 miles (6.3 km) northeast of Greenville.
