= Pine Flat, Alabama =

Unincorporated community in Alabama, United States

- Unincorporated community
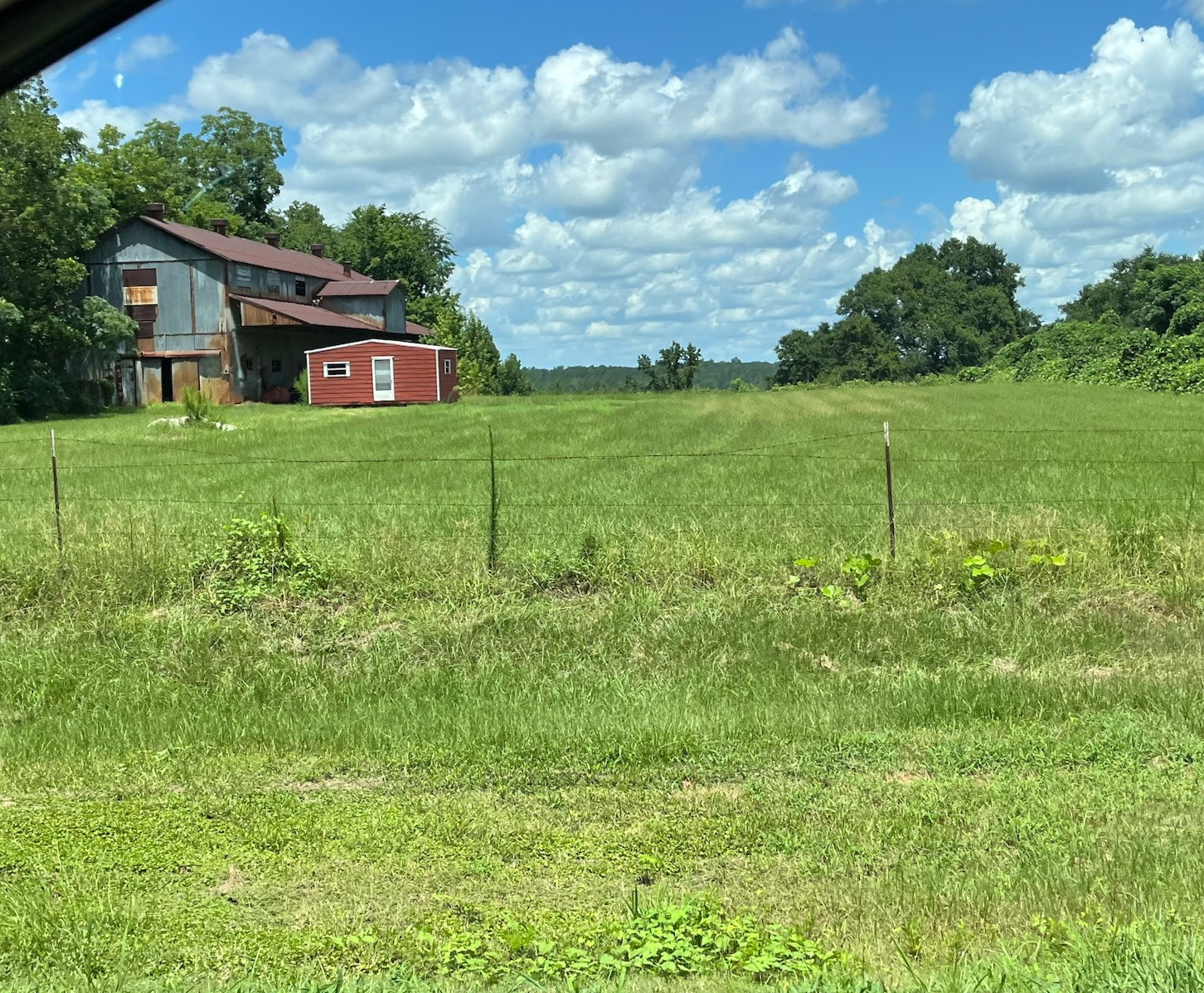
- Farm in Pine Flat

- Location within Alabama Location within the United States
- Coordinates: 31°50′21″N 86°53′22″W
- Country: United States
- State: Alabama
- County: Butler
- Elevation: 210 ft (64 m)
- Time zone: UTC-6 (Central (CST))
  - Summer (DST): UTC-5 (CDT)
- Area code: 334
- GNIS feature ID: 155363

Pine Flat, also known as Dogwood Flat, is an unincorporated community in Butler County, Alabama, United States, located on Alabama State Route 10.

== History ==
Pine Flat was originally known as Dogwood Flat, and was one of the first areas settled in Butler County.

A post office operated under the name Pine Flat from 1894 to 1907.

Fort Bibb was located in Pine Flat and was built around the house of James Saffold.

The William Carter Home (Pine Flat Plantation) and Pine Flat Methodist Church are listed on the Alabama Register of Landmarks and Heritage.

== Notable person ==
- Thomas H. Watts, 18th Governor of Alabama from 1863 to 1865
