= Saucer, Alabama =

Unincorporated community in Alabama, United States

- Unincorporated community
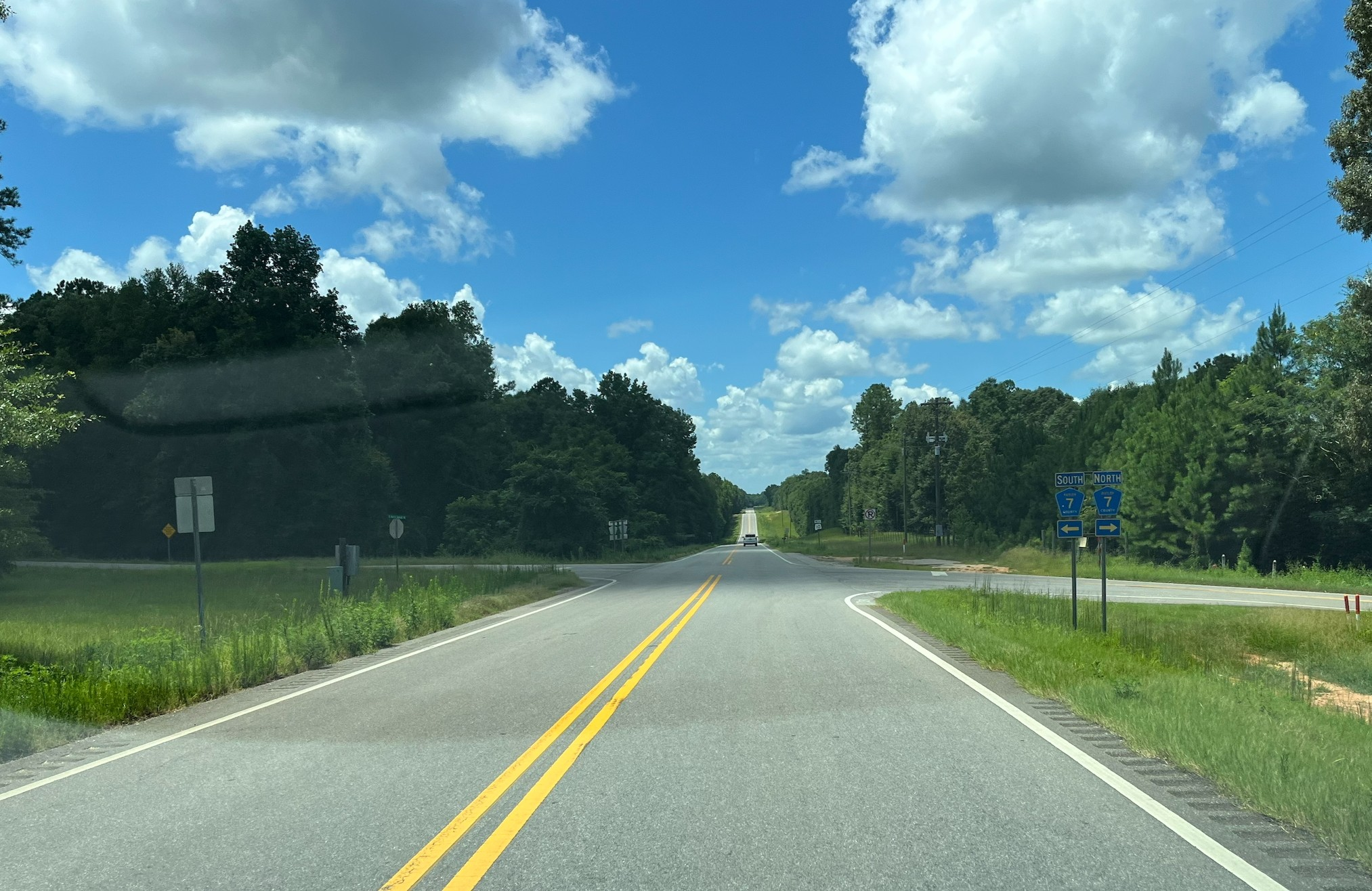
- Saucer along Alabama State Route 10

- Location within Alabama Location within the United States
- Coordinates: 31°49′23″N 86°50′08″W
- Country: United States
- State: Alabama
- County: Butler
- Elevation: 381 ft (116 m)
- Time zone: UTC-6 (Central (CST))
  - Summer (DST): UTC-5 (CDT)
- Area code: 334
- GNIS feature ID: 135056

Saucer is an unincorporated community in Butler County, Alabama, United States. Saucer is located along Alabama State Route 10. A post office operated under the name Saucer from 1903 to 1908.
