= Industry, Alabama =

Unincorporated community in Alabama, United States

- Unincorporated community
- Location within Alabama Location within the United States
- Coordinates: 31°36′16″N 86°36′46″W
- Country: United States
- State: Alabama
- County: Butler
- Elevation: 312 ft (95 m)
- Time zone: UTC-6 (Central (CST))
  - Summer (DST): UTC-5 (CDT)
- Area code: 334
- GNIS feature ID: 120678

Industry is an unincorporated community in Butler County, Alabama, United States.
