= River Falls, Alabama =

- Town
- Flag Seal

- Location of River Falls in Covington County, Alabama.
- Coordinates: 31°21′09″N 86°32′28″W
- Country: United States
- State: Alabama
- County: Covington

Area
  - Total: 7.10 sq mi (18.38 km^{2})
  - Land: 6.83 sq mi (17.70 km^{2})
  - Water: 0.26 sq mi (0.68 km^{2})
- Elevation: 203 ft (62 m)

Population (2020)
  - Total: 479
  - Density: 70.1/sq mi (27.06/km^{2})
- Time zone: UTC-6 (Central (CST))
  - Summer (DST): UTC-5 (CDT)
- ZIP code: 36476
- Area code: 334
- FIPS code: 01-64776
- GNIS feature ID: 2407223
- Website: www.riverfallsal.com

River Falls is a town in Covington County, Alabama, United States. At the 2020 census, the population was 479.

The town contains the neighborhood of Montezuma, which was once an unincorporated community and the first county seat of Covington County, before the seat moved to Andalusia.

== Geography ==
River Falls is located 5 miles (8 km) northwest of Andalusia, the county seat. The town lies along the Conecuh River. A hydroelectric dam creating Point A Lake on the river is located at the northeast corner of the town.

According to the U.S. Census Bureau, the town has a total area of 7.1 square miles (18.4 km^{2}), of which 6.8 square miles (17.7 km^{2}) is land and 0.27 square miles (0.7 km^{2}), or 3.67%, is water.

== Demographics ==
Historical population
Census	Pop.	Note	%±
1910	760		—
1920	1,107		45.7%
1930	556		−49.8%
1940	413		−25.7%
1950	376		−9.0%
1960	401		6.6%
1970	580		44.6%
1980	669		15.3%
1990	710		6.1%
2000	616		−13.2%
2010	526		−14.6%
2020	479		−8.9%
U.S. Decennial Census; 2013 Estimate

As of the census of 2000, there were 616 people, 272 households, and 174 families residing in the town. The population density was 88.9 inhabitants per square mile (34.3/km^{2}). There were 307 housing units at an average density of 44.3 per square mile (17.1/km^{2}). The racial makeup of the town was 62.50% White, 36.04% Black or African American, 0.65% Native American, and 0.81% from two or more races. 0.81% of the population were Hispanic or Latino of any race.

There were 272 households, out of which 27.6% had children under the age of 18 living with them, 46.3% were married couples living together, 14.7% had a female householder with no husband present, and 36.0% were non-families. 34.6% of all households were made up of individuals, and 15.4% had someone living alone who was 65 years of age or older. The average household size was 2.26 and the average family size was 2.89.

In the town, the population was spread out, with 22.7% under the age of 18, 9.4% from 18 to 24, 27.1% from 25 to 44, 24.0% from 45 to 64, and 16.7% who were 65 years of age or older. The median age was 40 years. For every 100 females, there were 93.7 males. For every 100 females age 18 and over, there were 83.1 males.

The median income for a household in the town was $21,838, and the median income for a family was $30,556. Males had a median income of $22,266 versus $20,469 for females. The per capita income for the town was $14,016. About 14.3% of families and 20.4% of the population were below the poverty line, including 27.0% of those under age 18 and 20.7% of those age 65 or over.

== 2012 mayoral scandal ==
The mayor of River Falls, Mary Ella Hixon, age 91, was accused in theft of $201,600 of public funds, during her mayorship. The scandal came August 2012, when a majority of the then-sitting River Falls Town Council members told the Andalusia Star-News they never voted in 2008 to sell the town's former city hall property to Richard Moss, Hixon's housemate for more than a decade. She served as mayor for more than 30 years. The court sentenced her to 10 years imprisonment, considering her advanced age, suspended for five years of implementation. Moss pleaded guilty to his part of the crime in May 2015. He was sentenced to 10 years in prison on each count, to be served concurrently. He was required to pay back $105,609.82 to the town of River Falls.

== Education ==
It is within the Covington County Board of Education school district.
