= Fort Crawford (Alabama) =

United States historic site

- East Brewton, Alabama in United States
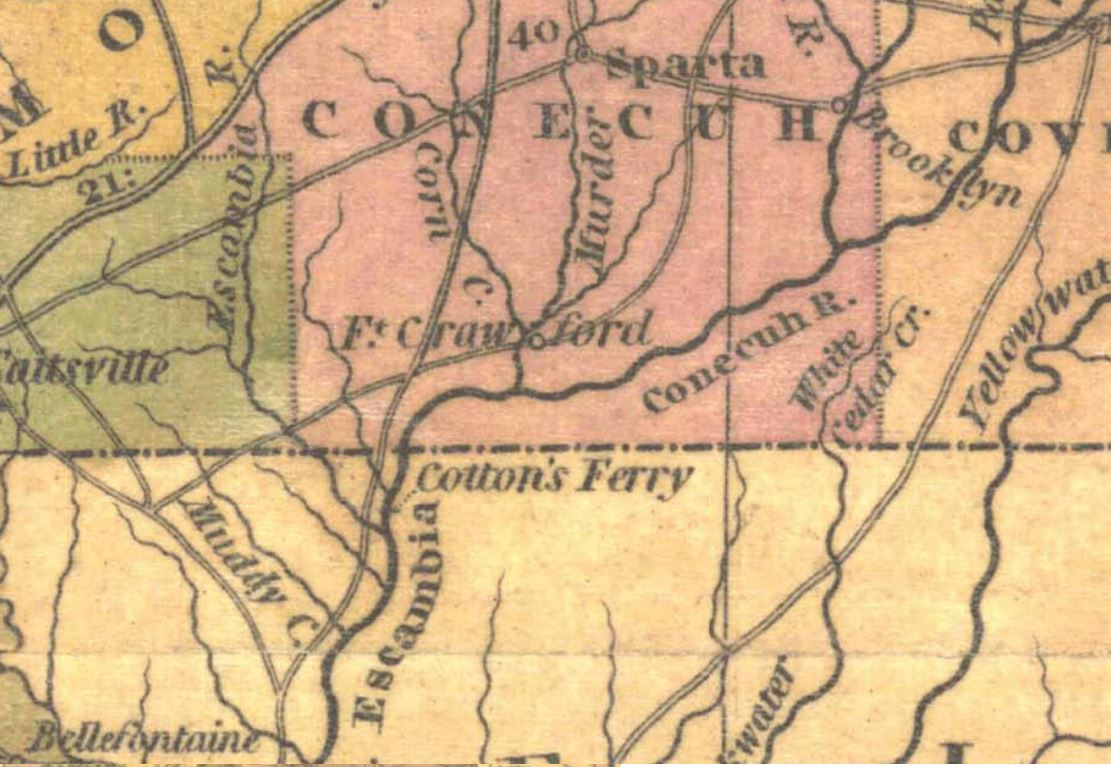
- Fort Crawford (located in the center) as portrayed in Henry Schenck Tanner's 1830 The Traveler's Pocket Map of Alabama.

Site information
- Type: Stockade fort
- Owner: Private
- Controlled by: Private
- Open to the public: No

Location
- Location within Alabama Location within the United States
- Coordinates: 31°06′03″N 87°02′44″W

Site history
- Built: 1816
- Built by: United States Army
- In use: 1816-1821
- Battles/wars: First Seminole War
- Events

Alabama Register of Landmarks and Heritage
- Designated: January 18, 1978

Fort Crawford was a fort that once provided defense for settlers in what is today East Brewton, Alabama.

== History ==
After the Creek War, General Andrew Jackson ordered Major General Edmund P. Gaines and the 7th Infantry Regiment to construct a fort to protect settlers in the area from hostile Red Sticks. General Gaines instructed Major David E. Twiggs to set out from Fort Montgomery and establish a new post. The fort was placed at the border of the newly-formed Alabama Territory and Spanish West Florida on the bank of Murder Creek. Fort Crawford was named for either 2nd Lieutenant Joel Crawford or for former US Secretary of War and US Secretary of the Treasury William H. Crawford. Major John M. Davis described the fort as having two blockhouses located diagonally from each other, with the walls of the fort being made from multiple buildings. The fort also contained a medical building, artificer shop, and guard house. During the First Seminole War, Fort Crawford served as a base of operations for raids against Red Sticks in the Florida Panhandle. After the Butler Massacre, soldiers and Choctaw under the command of Major White Youngs were sent from Fort Crawford to Fort Dale to assist in the pursuit of the Red Sticks.

Supplies were sent to Fort Crawford from Fort Montgomery but delays were common. General Gaines wrote to Jose Masot, the governor of West Florida, to ask permission for supplies to be sent up the Conecuh River from Pensacola. Masot allowed three different ships to supply Fort Crawford via Pensacola, but never permitted regular supply lines via Pensacola. General Jackson (while headquartered at Fort Gadsden), also wrote to Governor Masot requesting permission for ships to pass through Pensacola to Fort Crawford. Masot allowed the schooners Mobiliana and Italiana to bring supplies to Fort Crawford, but did not allow the Italiana to make a second trip without paying duties to the Kingdom of Spain. Jackson sent a Lieutenant Cross to Pensacola to discuss the release of the supplies without paying duties, but Masot would not agree. Masot did agree to release hostile Creeks into the custody of the United States for transportation back to Fort Crawford. In a letter to George W. Campbell, Jackson listed the seizure of Fort Crawford's supplies (along with Spain's harboring of hostile Creeks) as his reason for invading Pensacola on May 23, 1818.

After the Adams–Onís Treaty took effect in 1821, Florida was ceded to the United States and Fort Crawford was no longer needed for its original use.

Fort Crawford was connected to Fort Gaines via a road built in 1817.

A post office operated at Fort Crawford until at least 1824.

== Present site ==
The site is marked on maps from the 1800s, but archaeological investigations have been unable to identify the original site of the fort.

== Sources ==
- Harris, W. Stuart (1977). Dead Towns of Alabama. Tuscaloosa, Alabama: University of Alabama Press. ISBN 0-8173-1125-4.
- Jackson, Andrew (1927) [Composed 1818]. Bassett, John Spencer (ed.). Correspondence of Andrew Jackson. Vol. 2. Washington, D.C.: Carnegie Institution of Washington.
- Masot, Jose (1927) [Composed 1818]. Bassett, John Spencer (ed.). Correspondence of Andrew Jackson. Vol. 2. Washington, D.C.: Carnegie Institution of Washington. p. 359.
- Pickett, Albert James (1878). History of Alabama, and Incidentally of Georgia and Mississippi, from the Earliest Period. Tuscaloosa, Alabama: Willo Publishing Company. ISBN 978-1363310845.
- Shell, Eddie Wayne (2013). Evolution of the Alabama Agroecosystem: Always Keeping Up, but Never Catching Up. Montgomery, Alabama: NewSouth Books. ISBN 978-1-60306-203-9.
- Wilkerson, Lyn (2010). Slow Travels-Alabama. Lulu.com. ISBN 978-0-557-14055-8.
