= Braggs, Alabama =

Unincorporated community in Alabama, US

- Unincorporated community
- Location within Alabama Location within the United States
- Coordinates: 32°03′02″N 86°47′44″W
- Country: United States
- State: Alabama
- County: Lowndes
- Elevation: 285 ft (87 m)
- Time zone: UTC-6 (Central (CST))
  - Summer (DST): UTC-5 (CDT)
- Area code: 334

Braggs is an unincorporated community in Lowndes County, Alabama, United States.

== History ==
Braggs was named for Peter Braggs, who served as the first postmaster. Bragg served as a soldier during the American Revolutionary War.

A post office operated under the name Braggs from 1833 to 1959 and under the name Braggs Rural Station from 1959 to 1972.

== Geology ==
Portions of a mosasaur have been discovered in Braggs.

A Cretaceous–Paleogene boundary site is located near Braggs.
