= William Butler (militiaman) =

William Butler (1759 – 20 March 1818) was an American militiaman who fought in the Creek War. Born in Louisa County, Virginia, he moved to Hancock County, Georgia, where he married Charity Garrett in 1796 and served in the state legislature. He then moved west to the Alabama Territory. He served as a militia leader during the Creek War of 1813–1814.

Butler was killed near what is now Butler Springs, Alabama, on March 20, 1818, when he and four others travelling from Fort Bibb to Fort Dale were attacked by Creek Indians led by Savannah Jack. Butler managed to kill one of the attackers, but was overpowered by their numbers. His body and those others killed were found horribly mutilated the next day and were buried in the woods.

Nearly 40 years later, the remains of Captain Butler and his companions were moved to the cemetery at Greenville, Alabama, where a monument stands in their memory.

Butler County, Alabama, was named in his honor.
