= McKenzie, Alabama =

- Town
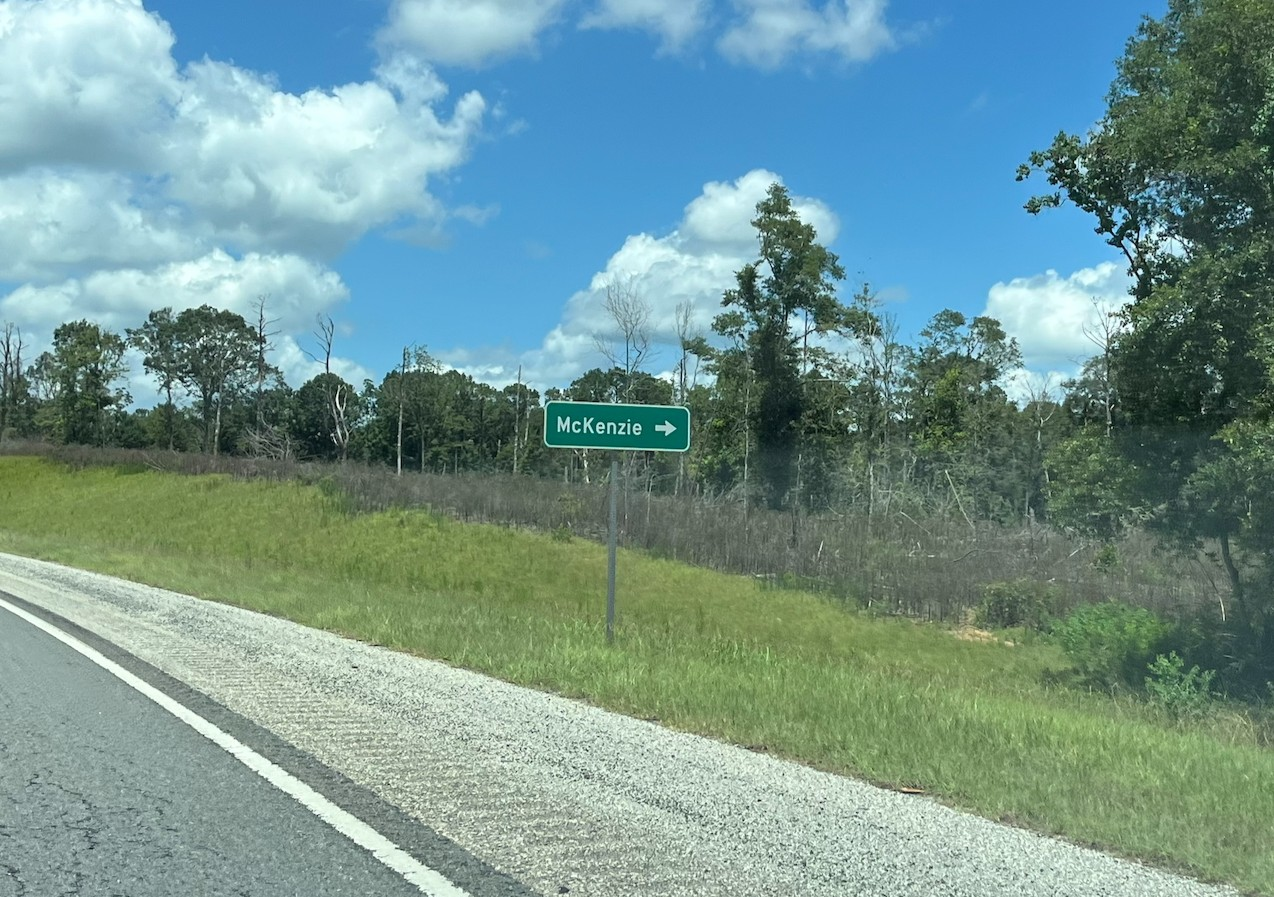
- Sign for McKenzie

- Location of McKenzie in Butler County and Conecuh County, Alabama.
- Coordinates: 31°32′34″N 86°43′29″W
- Country: United States
- State: Alabama
- Counties: Butler, Conecuh

Area
  - Total: 3.74 sq mi (9.69 km^{2})
  - Land: 3.72 sq mi (9.64 km^{2})
  - Water: 0.015 sq mi (0.04 km^{2})
- Elevation: 427 ft (130 m)

Population (2020)
  - Total: 507
  - Density: 136.2/sq mi (52.57/km^{2})
- Time zone: UTC-6 (Central (CST))
  - Summer (DST): UTC-5 (CDT)
- ZIP code: 36456
- Area code: 334
- FIPS code: 01-45496
- GNIS feature ID: 2406134

McKenzie is a town in Butler and Conecuh counties in the U.S. state of Alabama. As of the 2020 census, McKenzie had a population of 507.

== Geography ==
McKenzie is located in southern Butler County. A portion of the town extends south into Conecuh County. U.S. Route 31 passes to the west of the town center, leading north 23 miles (37 km) to Greenville, the Butler County seat, and southwest 19 miles (31 km) to Evergreen, the Conecuh County seat. State Route 55 leads southeast from McKenzie 23 miles (37 km) to Andalusia.

According to the United States Census Bureau, McKenzie has a total area of 3.7 square miles (9.7 km^{2}), of which 0.015 square miles (0.04 km^{2}), or 0.45%, is water.

== Demographics ==
Historical population
Census	Pop.	Note	%±
1920	293		—
1930	396		35.2%
1940	504		27.3%
1950	504		0.0%
1960	558		10.7%
1970	491		−12.0%
1980	605		23.2%
1990	464		−23.3%
2000	644		38.8%
2010	530		−17.7%
2020	507		−4.3%
U.S. Decennial Census; 2018 Estimate

As of the census of 2000, there were 644 people, 284 households, and 170 families residing in the town. The population density was 171.4 inhabitants per square mile (66.2/km^{2}). There were 324 housing units at an average density of 86.2 per square mile (33.3/km^{2}). The racial makeup of the town was 76.09% White, 22.52% Black or African American, 0.47% Native American, 0.16% Asian, and 0.78% from two or more races. 0.31% of the population were Hispanic or Latino of any race.

There were 284 households, out of which 28.2% had children under the age of 18 living with them, 40.8% were married couples living together, 16.2% had a female householder with no husband present, and 40.1% were non-families. 37.7% of all households were made up of individuals, and 22.2% had someone living alone who was 65 years of age or older. The average household size was 2.27 and the average family size was 3.04.

In the town, the age distribution of the population shows 25.3% under the age of 18, 7.5% from 18 to 24, 24.5% from 25 to 44, 21.4% from 45 to 64, and 21.3% who were 65 years of age or older. The median age was 41 years. For every 100 females, there were 86.1 males. For every 100 females age 18 and over, there were 77.5 males.

The median income for a household in the town was $18,173, and the median income for a family was $24,423. Males had a median income of $23,077 versus $16,071 for females. The per capita income for the town was $10,359. About 21.1% of families and 27.5% of the population were below the poverty line, including 34.3% of those under age 18 and 33.3% of those age 65 or over.

== Education ==
McKenzie High School is a K-12 school located in McKenzie.
