= Mac Crenshaw Memorial Airport =

Airport in Alabama, United States

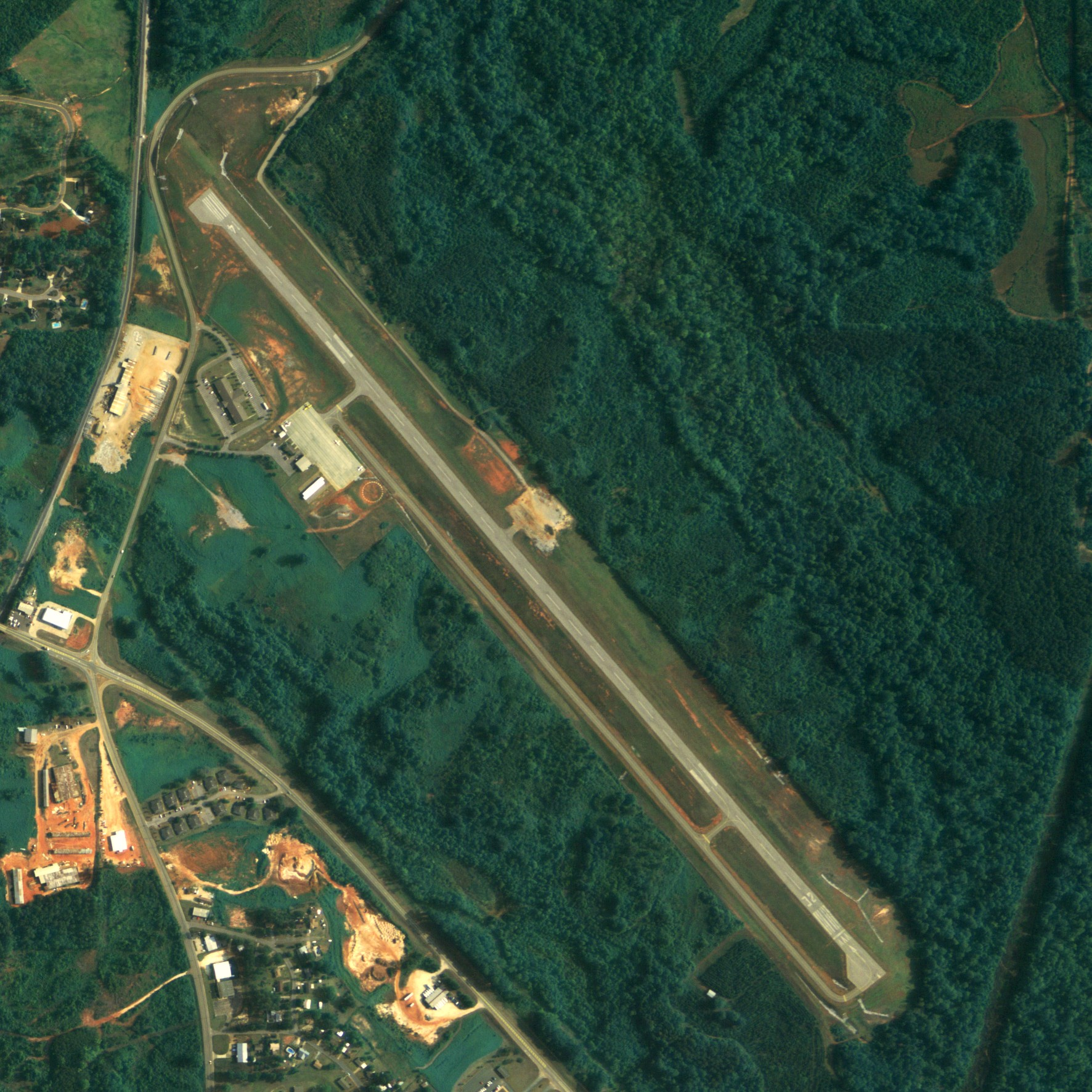
- IATA: none; ICAO: KPRN; FAA LID: PRN

Summary
- Airport type: Public
- Owner: City of Greenville
- Serves: Greenville, Alabama
- Elevation AMSL: 451 ft (137 m)
- Coordinates: 31°50′44″N 086°36′38″W
- Interactive map of Mac Crenshaw Memorial Airport

Runways
Direction	Length		Surface
Direction	ft	m	Surface
14/32	5,500	1,676	Asphalt

Statistics (2006)
- Aircraft operations: 4,274
- Source: Federal Aviation Administration

Mac Crenshaw Memorial Airport (ICAO: KPRN, FAA LID: PRN) is a city-owned public-use airport located 2 nautical miles (4 km) northeast of the central business district of Greenville, a city in Butler County, Alabama, United States.

Although most U.S. airports use the same three-letter location identifier for the FAA and IATA, this airport is assigned PRN by the FAA but has no designation from the IATA.

== Facilities and aircraft ==
Mac Crenshaw Memorial Airport covers an area of 89 acres (36 ha) at an elevation of 451 feet (137 m) above mean sea level. It has one asphalt paved runway designated 14/32 which measures 5,500 by 80 ft (1,676 by 24 m). For the 12-month period ending September 13, 2006, the airport had 4,274 aircraft operations, an average of 11 per day: 88% general aviation and 12% military.

== See also ==
- List of airports in Alabama
