= Fort Dale =

Stockade fort built in present-day Butler County, Alabama, United States

- Greenville, Alabama in United States
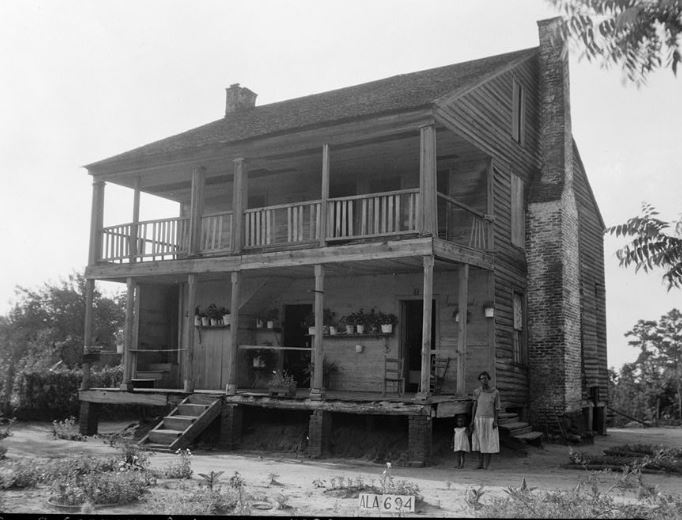
- "The Palings" stage stop in 1933 as documented during the Historic American Buildings Survey

Site information
- Type: Stockade fort
- Owner: Private
- Controlled by: Private
- Open to the public: No

Location
- Location within Alabama Location within the United States
- Coordinates: 31°53′33″N 86°38′58″W

Site history
- Built: March 1818
- Built by: Alabama Territory settlers
- In use: 1818
- Events

Alabama Register of Landmarks and Heritage
- Designated: January 29, 1980

Fort Dale was a stockade fort built in present-day Butler County, Alabama, United States, by Alabama Territory settlers. The fort was constructed in response to Creek Indian attacks on settlers in the surrounding area.

== Background ==
After the Creek War, a number of hostile Creeks (known as Red Sticks) remained in the area surrounding present-day Butler County. The Red Sticks were indignant over the large number of settlers who began traveling down the Federal Road and soon began attacking them. Settlers in the area began building protective stockades such as the one built by Thomas Gary near present-day Greenville. Gary had built a blockhouse and charged residents a fee to stay in it. On March 13, 1818, members of the Ogly and Stroud families were killed by Red Stick warriors under the command of Uchee Tom in what became known as the Ogly-Stroud Massacre. After the massacre, settlers petitioned territorial governor William Wyatt Bibb over the fees Gary was charging. In response, Bibb dispatched Captain Samuel Dale and a number of troops from Fort Claiborne to strengthen Fort Bibb and construct a new fort on the Federal Road.

== History ==
=== Fort ===
While under construction, the builders decided to name the fort in honor of Dale. The fort was built on the Federal Road and encompassed a settler's cabin. The fort's defenses consisted of a wooden stockade and two blockhouses. Lieutenant Colonel Gilbert C. Russell described the blockhouses as being built at diagonal angles. Seven days after the Ogly-Stroud Massacre, Captain William Butler, William Gardender, James Saffold, Daniel Shaw, and John Hinson left Fort Bibb towards Fort Dale with a message for Dale. En route, the party was attacked and killed by Reds Sticks under the command of Savannah Jack. This incident became known as the Butler Massacre and added to the settlers' fear. In response, additional troops were sent from Fort Claiborne to reinforce Fort Dale. Soldiers and allied Choctaw warriors were also sent from Fort Crawford to assist in the pursuit of the Red Sticks. Fort Dale was garrisoned from April to June 1818, but some sources indicate it was garrisoned until the end of 1818. Members of the Choctaw tribe served with the 8th U.S. Infantry at Fort Dale during the summer of 1818. Captain W. F. Ware commanded a detachment of cavalry and a Captain Motley commanded infantry at Fort Dale in September 1818. Lieutenant Samuel Riddle of the U.S. Army was also stationed at Fort Dale in the fall of 1818.

An inn and stagecoach stop was built near the site of Fort Dale and was known as "The Palings" (so named due to the palisade of Fort Dale). English merchant Adam Hodgson stayed at "The Palings" on his North American tour, describing it as a "flourishing plantation".

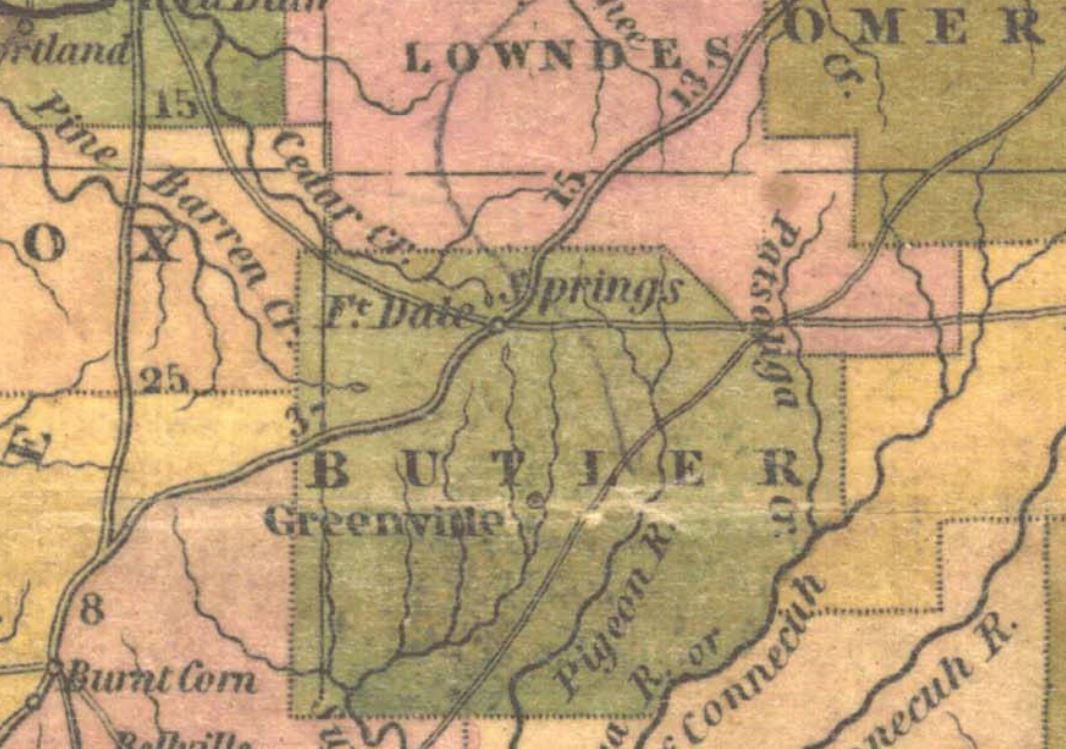
Fort Dale (located in the center) as portrayed in Henry Schenck Tanner's 1830 The Traveler's Pocket Map of Alabama.

=== Community ===
Once the fort was no longer needed for protection, a community grew up around the fort site. The community was originally known as Poplar Spring but later known as Fort Dale. Fort Dale served as the county seat for Butler County from 1819 to 1822. A post office first began operating at Fort Dale in October 1818, with John Herbert serving as the first postmaster. Fort Dale was also a stop on a postal road from Greenville to Hayneville. Fort Dale also had the first school and church in Butler County and served as one of the first voting sites.

Naturalist William Bartram passed by the site of Fort Dale on his four-year journey through the Southern United States.

=== Present site ===
Nothing remains of Fort Dale today. The Fort Dale Cemetery lies along Alabama State Route 185 and is near the site of Fort Dale. The cemetery was documented in the 1935 Historic American Buildings Survey and the earliest marked burial in Butler County is located in the cemetery. The cemetery and former fort site are listed on the Alabama Register of Landmarks and Heritage.

== Sources ==
- Braund, Kathryn; Waselkov, Gregory; Christopher, Raven (2019). The Old Federal Road in Alabama. Tuscaloosa, Alabama: University of Alabama Press. ISBN 978-0-8173-5930-0.
- Foscue, Virginia (1989). Place Names in Alabama. Tuscaloosa, Alabama: The University of Alabama Press. ISBN 0-8173-0410-X.
- Harris, W. Stuart (1977). Dead Towns of Alabama. Tuscaloosa, Alabama: University of Alabama Press. ISBN 0-8173-1125-4.
- Little, John Buckner (1885). History of Butler County, Alabama, 1815 to 1885. Cincinnati, Ohio: J. G. Little, Jr. LCCN rc01002468.
- Pickett, Albert James (1878). History of Alabama, and Incidentally of Georgia and Mississippi, from the Earliest Period. Tuscaloosa, Alabama: Willo Publishing Company. ISBN 978-1363310845.
- United States Congress (1836). Register of Debates in Congress: Comprising the Leading Debates and Incidents of the First Session of the Twenty-Fourth Congress. Washington, D.C.: Gales & Seaton.
- Waselkov, Gregory; Christopher, Raven (April 2012). Archaeological Survey of the Old Federal Road in Alabama (Technical report). Montgomery, Alabama: Alabama Department of Transportation. "Submitted by the Center for Archaeological Studies University of South Alabama."
