= Fort Deposit, Alabama =

- Town
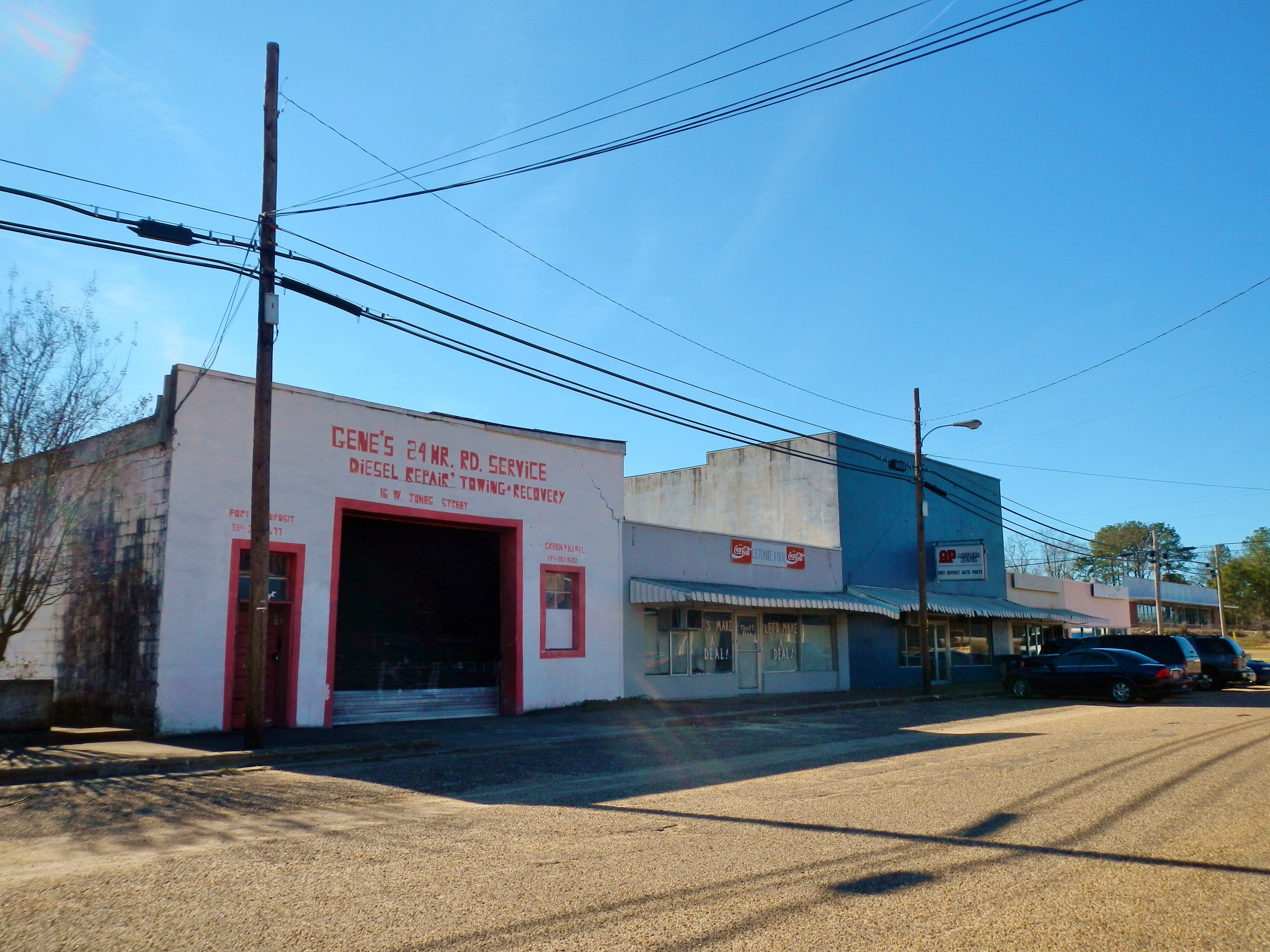
- Fort Deposit, Alabama

- Location of Fort Deposit in Lowndes County, Alabama.
- Coordinates: 31°59′32″N 86°34′19″W
- Country: United States
- State: Alabama
- County: Lowndes

Area
  - Total: 5.66 sq mi (14.66 km^{2})
  - Land: 5.66 sq mi (14.66 km^{2})
  - Water: 0 sq mi (0.00 km^{2})
- Elevation: 453 ft (138 m)

Population (2020)
  - Total: 1,225
  - Density: 216.4/sq mi (83.54/km^{2})
- Time zone: UTC-6 (Central (CST))
  - Summer (DST): UTC-5 (CDT)
- ZIP code: 36032
- Area code: 334
- FIPS code: 01-27520
- GNIS feature ID: 2406507
- Website: fortdeposital.gov

Fort Deposit is a town in Lowndes County, Alabama, United States. Since 1890, it has been the largest town in Lowndes County. As of the 2020 census, Fort Deposit had a population of 1,225. It is part of the Montgomery Metropolitan Statistical Area.

This town is named after a fort that was built under the order of General Andrew Jackson. This was a supply fort that was built to serve the soldiers during the Creek Indian War. There is an annual arts and crafts fair called Calico Fort on the second weekend of April every year.

It was incorporated on February 13, 1891. It reportedly sits on the highest point of land between Montgomery and New Orleans, Louisiana.

== Geography ==
According to the U.S. Census Bureau, the town has a total area of 5.6 square miles (15 km^{2}), all land.

=== Climate ===
According to the Köppen climate classification, Fort Deposit has a humid subtropical climate (abbreviated Cfa).

Climate data for Fort Deposit, 1991–2020 simulated normals (486 ft elevation)
Month	Jan	Feb	Mar	Apr	May	Jun	Jul	Aug	Sep	Oct	Nov	Dec	Year
Mean daily maximum °F (°C)	58.1 (14.5)	62.1 (16.7)	69.3 (20.7)	76.1 (24.5)	83.1 (28.4)	88.5 (31.4)	90.9 (32.7)	90.3 (32.4)	86.5 (30.3)	77.7 (25.4)	67.5 (19.7)	59.7 (15.4)	75.8 (24.3)
Daily mean °F (°C)	46.8 (8.2)	50.4 (10.2)	57.2 (14.0)	63.7 (17.6)	71.8 (22.1)	78.1 (25.6)	80.8 (27.1)	80.1 (26.7)	75.7 (24.3)	65.8 (18.8)	55.4 (13.0)	48.9 (9.4)	64.6 (18.1)
Mean daily minimum °F (°C)	35.4 (1.9)	38.7 (3.7)	45.0 (7.2)	51.4 (10.8)	60.3 (15.7)	67.6 (19.8)	70.7 (21.5)	70.0 (21.1)	65.1 (18.4)	53.8 (12.1)	43.2 (6.2)	38.1 (3.4)	53.3 (11.8)
Average precipitation inches (mm)	5.25 (133.30)	4.84 (122.97)	5.39 (136.78)	4.55 (115.67)	3.87 (98.27)	4.96 (125.99)	5.08 (128.97)	4.75 (120.58)	4.01 (101.80)	3.32 (84.32)	4.38 (111.31)	5.40 (137.16)	55.8 (1,417.12)
Average dew point °F (°C)	37.6 (3.1)	40.5 (4.7)	45.5 (7.5)	52.2 (11.2)	60.6 (15.9)	68.0 (20.0)	70.9 (21.6)	70.3 (21.3)	65.8 (18.8)	55.8 (13.2)	46.2 (7.9)	41.0 (5.0)	54.5 (12.5)
Source: PRISM Climate Group

== Demographics ==
Historical population
Census	Pop.	Note	%±
1880	350		—
1890	518		48.0%
1900	1,078		108.1%
1910	893		−17.2%
1920	830		−7.1%
1930	1,092		31.6%
1940	1,351		23.7%
1950	1,358		0.5%
1960	1,466		8.0%
1970	1,438		−1.9%
1980	1,519		5.6%
1990	1,240		−18.4%
2000	1,270		2.4%
2010	1,344		5.8%
2020	1,225		−8.9%
U.S. Decennial Census; 2013 Estimate

=== Racial and ethnic composition ===
Fort Deposit town, Alabama – Racial and ethnic composition Note: the US Census treats Hispanic/Latino as an ethnic category. This table excludes Latinos from the racial categories and assigns them to a separate category. Hispanics/Latinos may be of any race. Race and ethnicity was not surveyed for populations under 2,500 in the 1980 census and under 1,000 in 1990 census.
Race / Ethnicity (NH = Non-Hispanic)	Pop 1990	Pop 2000	Pop 2010	Pop 2020	% 1990	% 2000	% 2010	% 2020
White alone (NH)	403	397	315	244	32.50%	31.26%	23.44%	19.92%
Black or African American alone (NH)	827	863	1,012	942	66.69%	67.95%	75.30%	76.90%
Native American or Alaska Native alone (NH)	1	0	1	0	0.08%	0.00%	0.07%	0.00%
Asian alone (NH)	0	0	2	3	0.00%	0.00%	0.15%	0.24%
Native Hawaiian or Pacific Islander alone (NH)	x	0	0	0	x	0.00%	0.00%	0.00%
Other race alone (NH)	0	0	0	0	0.00%	0.00%	0.00%	0.00%
Mixed race or Multiracial (NH)	x	4	8	23	x	0.31%	0.60%	1.88%
Hispanic or Latino (any race)	9	6	6	13	0.73%	0.47%	0.45%	1.06%
Total	1,240	1,270	1,344	1,225	100.00%	100.00%	100.00%	100.00%

=== 2020 census ===
As of the 2020 census, Fort Deposit had a population of 1,225. The median age was 36.5 years. 27.7% of residents were under the age of 18 and 14.4% of residents were 65 years of age or older. For every 100 females there were 86.2 males, and for every 100 females age 18 and over there were 79.7 males age 18 and over.

0.0% of residents lived in urban areas, while 100.0% lived in rural areas.

There were 479 households in Fort Deposit, of which 34.4% had children under the age of 18 living in them. Of all households, 34.0% were married-couple households, 19.6% were households with a male householder and no spouse or partner present, and 41.8% were households with a female householder and no spouse or partner present. About 29.6% of all households were made up of individuals and 9.8% had someone living alone who was 65 years of age or older.

There were 534 housing units, of which 10.3% were vacant. The homeowner vacancy rate was 1.8% and the rental vacancy rate was 11.0%.

=== 2010 census ===
At the 2010 census there were 1,344 people, 512 households, and 348 families in the town. The population density was 240 inhabitants per square mile (93/km^{2}). There were 592 housing units at an average density of 105.7 per square mile (40.8/km^{2}). The racial makeup of the town was 75.5% Black or African American, 23.7% White and 0.6% from two or more races. 0.4% of the population were Hispanic or Latino of any race. Of the 512 households 28.9% had children under the age of 18 living with them, 34.8% were married couples living together, 29.3% had a female householder with no husband present, and 32.0% were non-families. 28.9% of households were one person and 11.2% were one person aged 65 or older. The average household size was 2.63 and the average family size was 3.28.

The age distribution was 29.5% under the age of 18, 9.6% from 18 to 24, 22.1% from 25 to 44, 26.6% from 45 to 64, and 12.2% 65 or older. The median age was 34.3 years. For every 100 females, there were 86.9 males. For every 100 women age 18 and over, there were 76.7 men.

The median household income was $30,000 and the median family income was $31,591. Males had a median income of $41,579 versus $25,341 for females. The per capita income for the town was $14,411. About 19.4% of families and 22.2% of the population were below the poverty line, including 43.6% of those under age 18 and 25.4% of those age 65 or over.

=== 2000 Census ===
At the 2000 census there were 1,270 people, 489 households, and 349 families in the town. The population density was 225.1 inhabitants per square mile (86.9/km^{2}). There were 569 housing units at an average density of 100.9 per square mile (39.0/km^{2}). The racial makeup of the town was 68.19% Black or African American, 31.50% White and 0.31% from two or more races. 0.47% of the population were Hispanic or Latino of any race. Of the 489 households 35.0% had children under the age of 18 living with them, 39.3% were married couples living together, 27.4% had a female householder with no husband present, and 28.6% were non-families. 25.6% of households were one person and 9.6% were one person aged 65 or older. The average household size was 2.60 and the average family size was 3.12.

The age distribution was 29.8% under the age of 18, 8.6% from 18 to 24, 27.1% from 25 to 44, 21.7% from 45 to 64, and 12.8% 65 or older. The median age was 35 years. For every 100 females, there were 86.2 males. For every 100 women age 18 and over, there were 83.0 men.

The median household income was $20,433 and the median family income was $24,250. Males had a median income of $27,391 versus $20,882 for females. The per capita income for the town was $12,584. About 29.8% of families and 35.3% of the population were below the poverty line, including 42.8% of those under age 18 and 34.2% of those age 65 or over.

== Notable people ==
- Ed Bell, country blues singer and guitarist
- Richard Williamson, former NFL head coach (Tampa Bay Buccaneers)

== Gallery ==
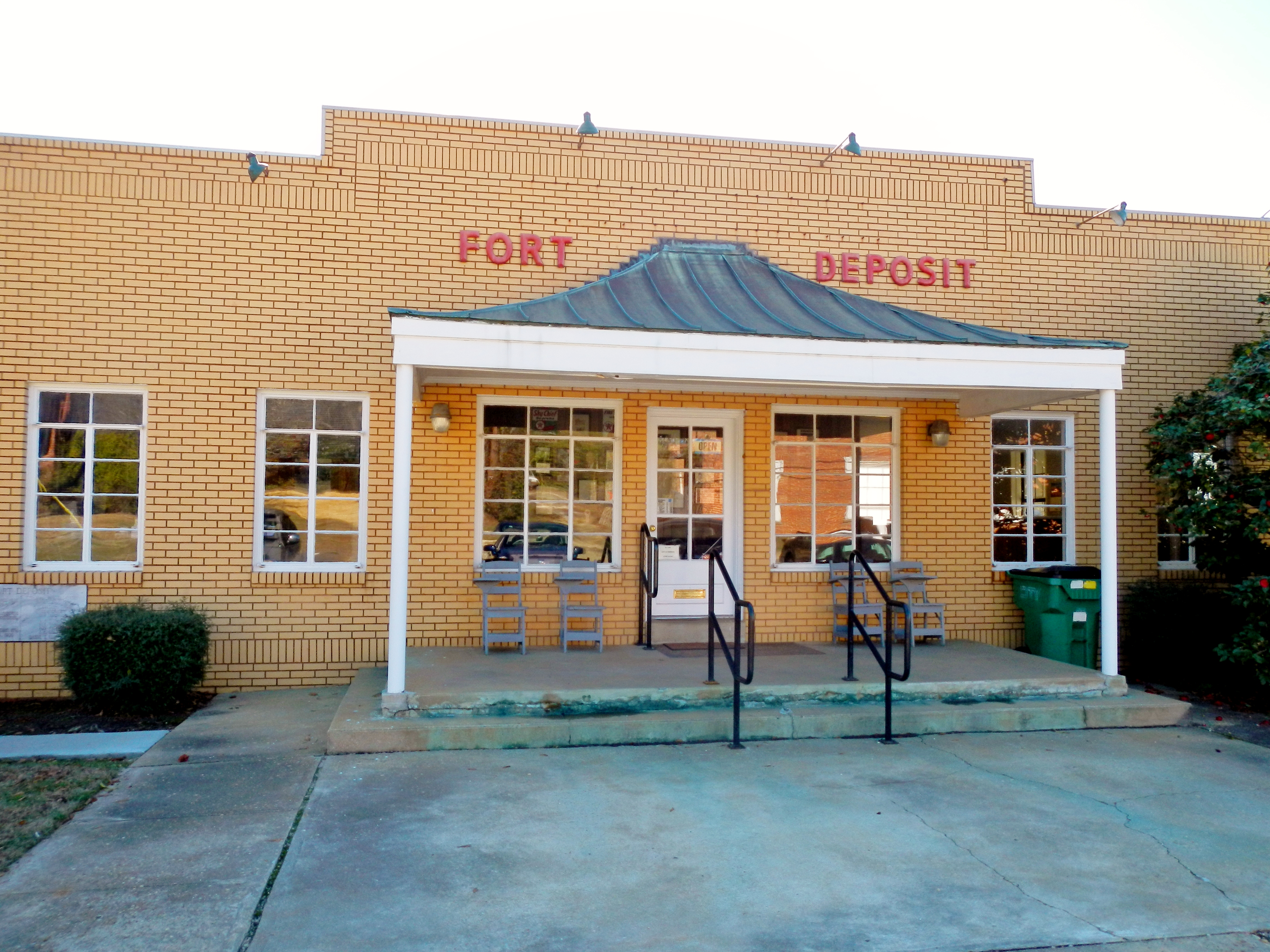
Fort Deposit Town Hall

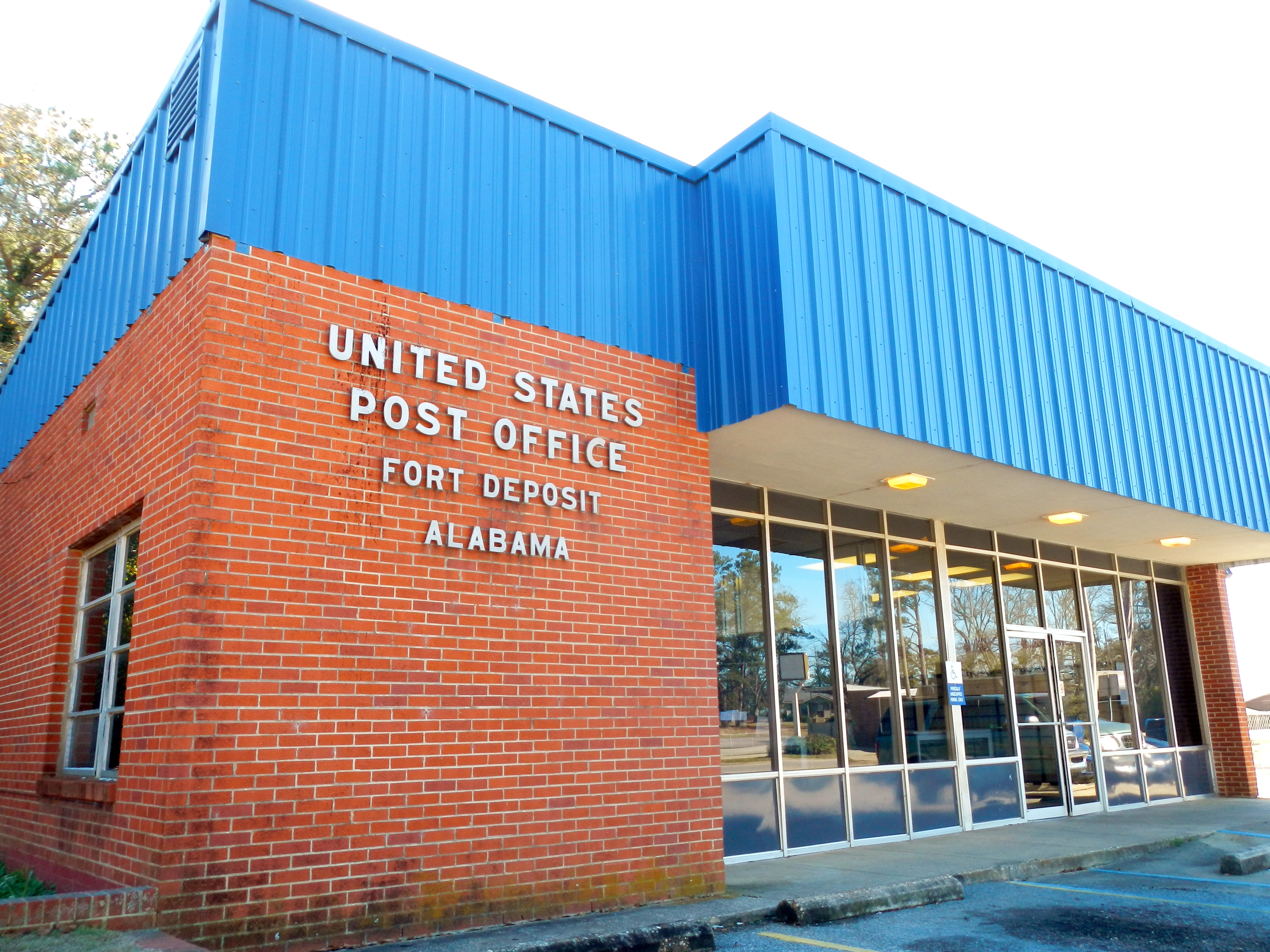
Fort Deposit Post Office (ZIP code:36032)

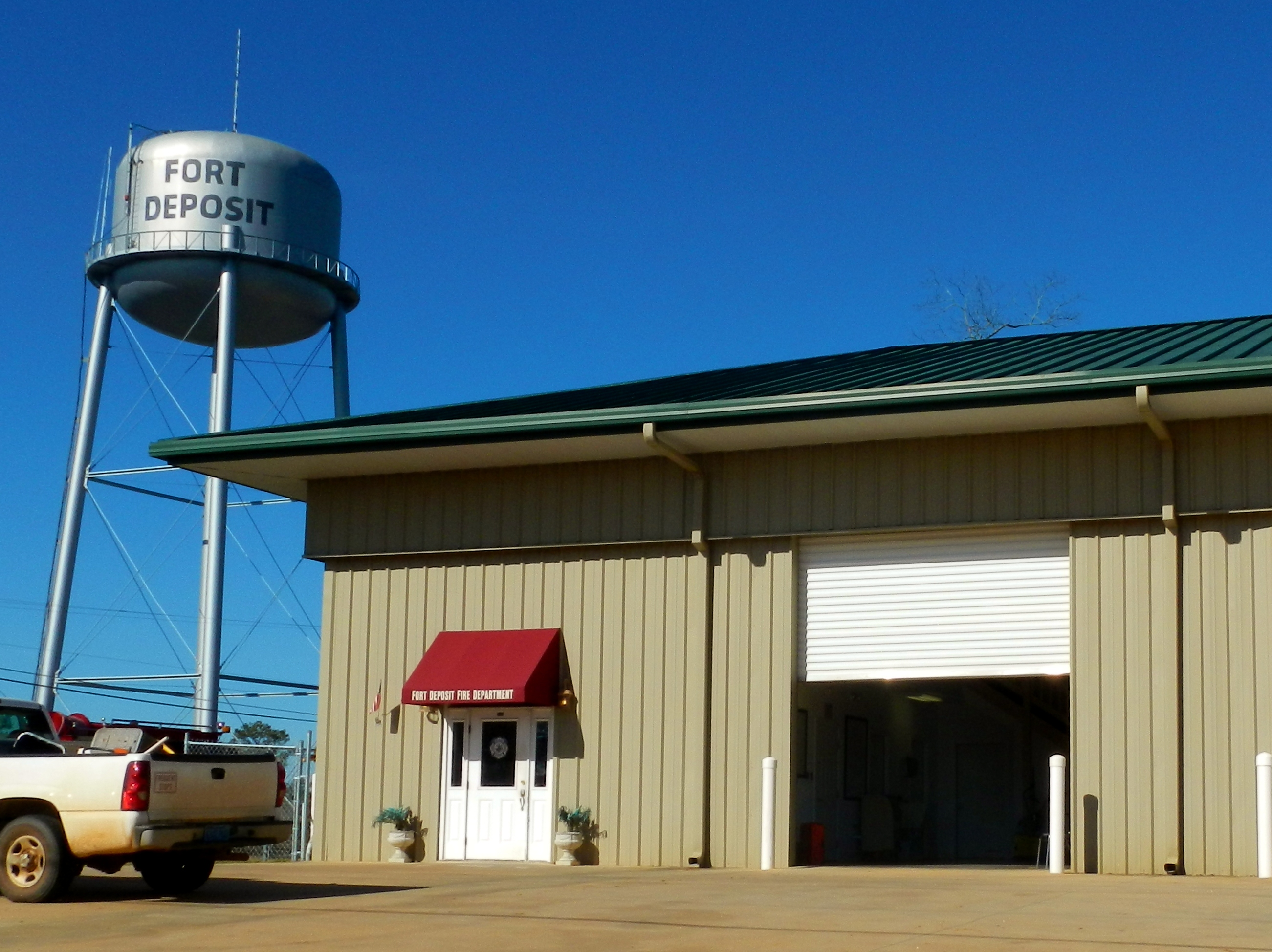
Fort Deposit Fire Department

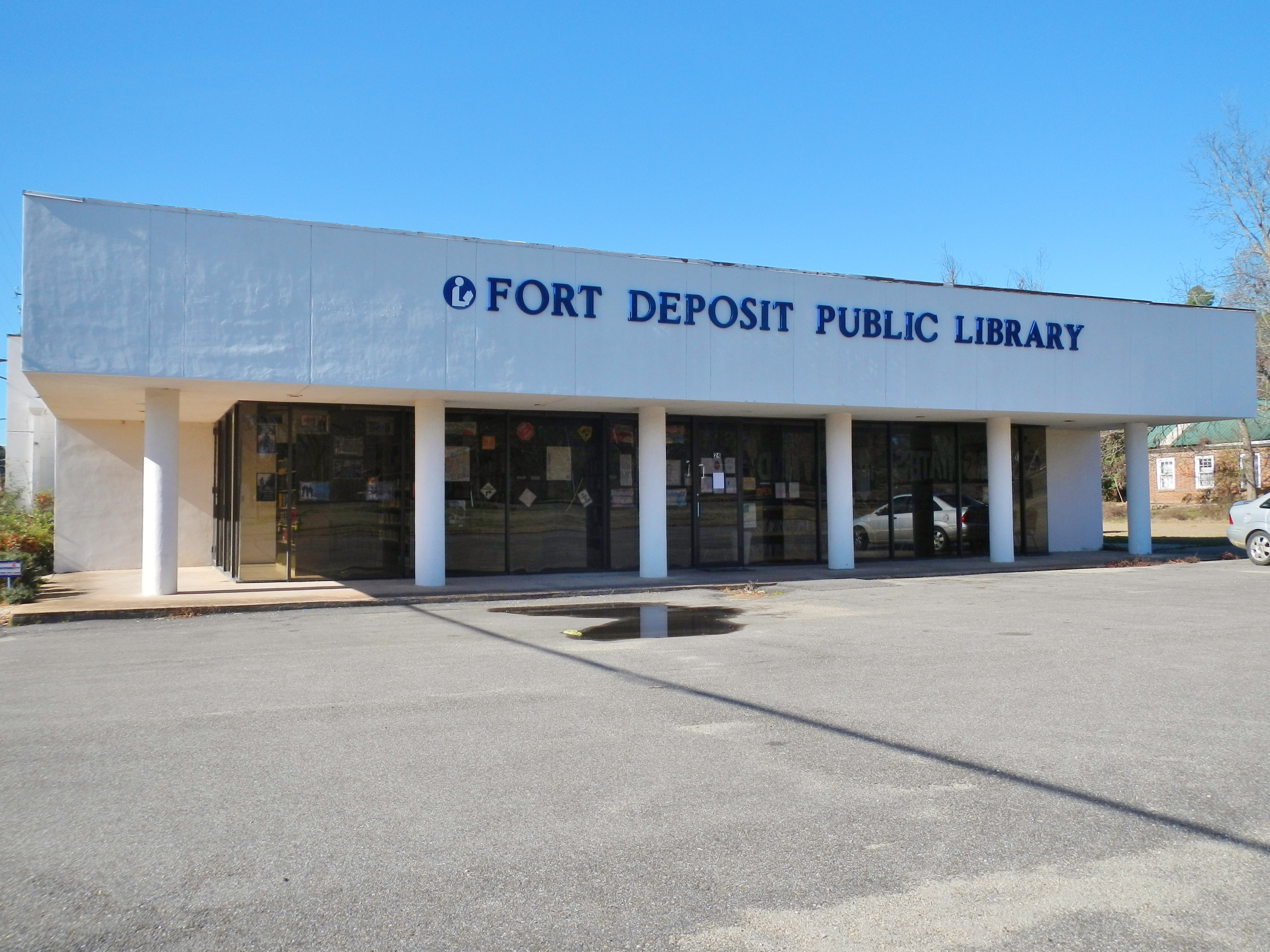
Fort Deposit Public Library

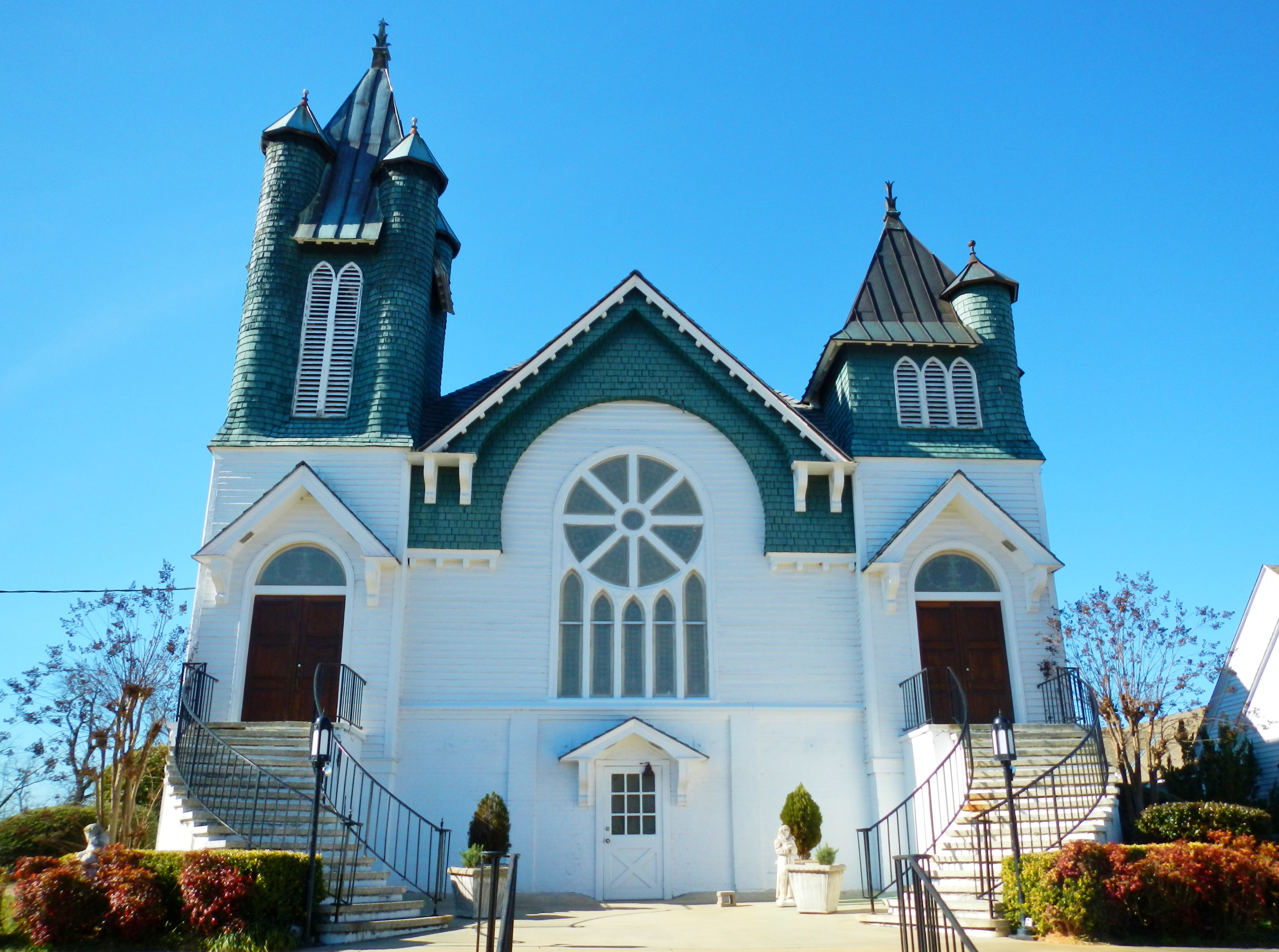
Fort Deposit United Methodist Church

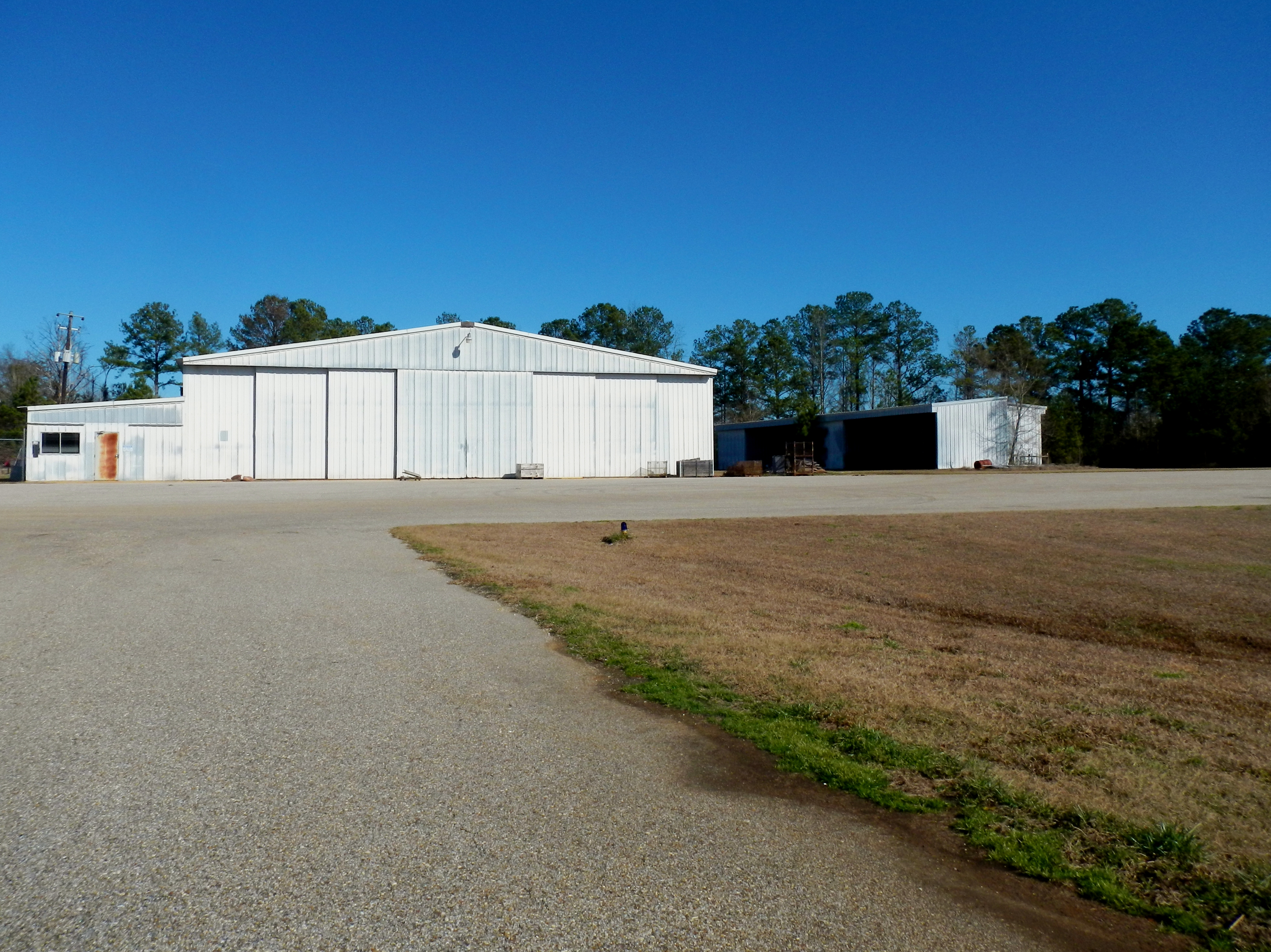
Fort Deposit–Lowndes County Airport
