= Butler County, Alabama =

County in Alabama, United States

- County
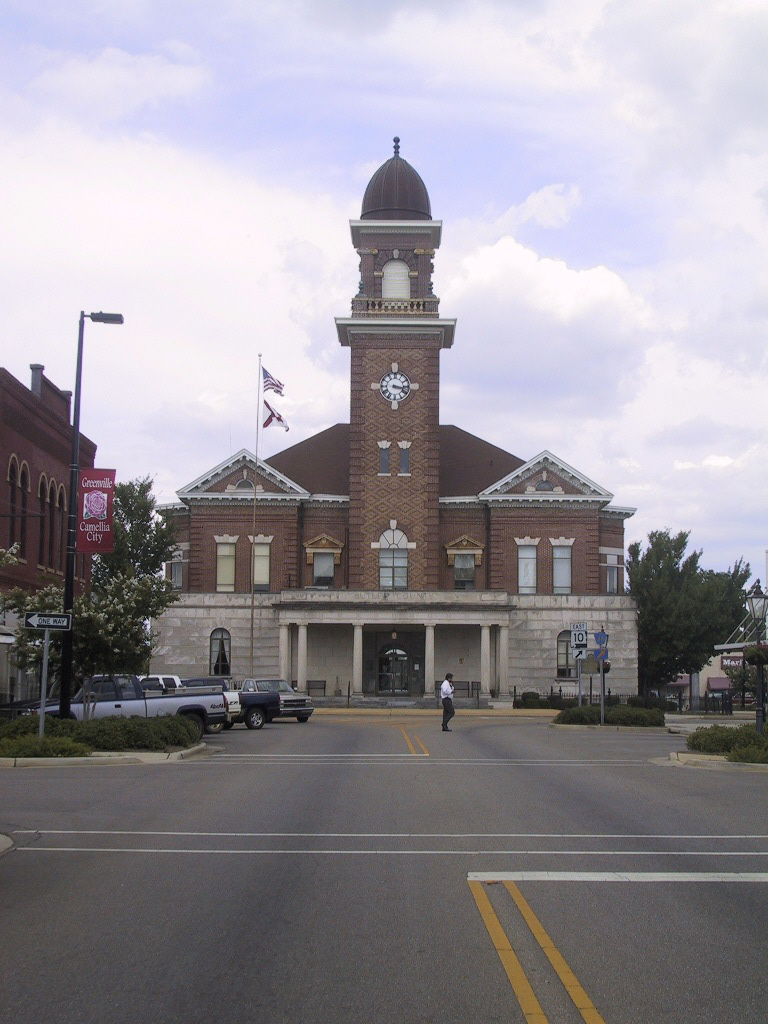
- Butler County Courthouse in Greenville

- Seal

- Location within the U.S. state of Alabama
- Coordinates: 31°44′58″N 86°40′56″W
- Country: United States
- State: Alabama
- Founded: December 13, 1819
- Named for: William Butler
- Seat: Greenville
- Largest city: Greenville

Area
  - Total: 778 sq mi (2,020 km^{2})
  - Land: 777 sq mi (2,010 km^{2})
  - Water: 1.1 sq mi (2.8 km^{2}) 0.1%

Population (2020)
  - Total: 19,051
  - Estimate (2025): 18,100 ▼
  - Density: 24.5/sq mi (9.47/km^{2})
- Time zone: UTC−6 (Central)
  - Summer (DST): UTC−5 (CDT)
- Congressional district: 2nd
- Website: www.butlercogov.com
- County Number 10 on Alabama License Plates

Butler County is a county located in the south central portion of the U.S. state of Alabama. As of the 2020 census, the population was 19,051. Its county seat is Greenville. Its name is in honor of Captain William Butler, who was born in Virginia and fought in the Creek War, and who was killed in May 1818.

== History ==
Butler County was formed from Conecuh County, Alabama, and Monroe County, Alabama, by an act passed December 13, 1819, by the Legislature while in session at Huntsville. This was the first session of the Legislature of Alabama as a State. The name of Fairfield was first proposed for this county, but was changed on the passage of the bill to Butler, in honor of Captain William Butler.

The precise date of the first settlement made by whites in Butler County is unclear. Some have it as early as 1814, but the earliest settler of no dispute is James K. Benson, who settled in the Flat in 1815, where he built a log house near the current location of Pine Flat Methodist Church. He was soon followed by William Ogly and John Dickerson and their families, who settled on the Federal Road, some 3 miles (4.8 km) south of where later Fort Dale was built. In the fall of 1816, a group of people from Georgia settled in a tent camp in Pine Flat, and the year after, another group settled near Fort Dale.

== Geography ==
According to the United States Census Bureau, the county has a total area of 778 square miles (2,020 km^{2}), of which 777 square miles (2,010 km^{2}) is land and 1.1 square miles (2.8 km^{2}) (0.1%) is water. It is located in the Gulf Coastal Plain region of the state.

=== Major highways ===
- Interstate 65
- U.S. Highway 31 / State Route 3 (unsigned)
- State Route 10
- State Route 55
- State Route 106
- State Route 185
- State Route 245
- State Route 263

=== Adjacent counties ===
- Lowndes County (north)
- Crenshaw County (east)
- Covington County (southeast)
- Conecuh County (southwest)
- Monroe County (west)
- Wilcox County (northwest)

== Demographics ==
Historical population
Census	Pop.	Note	%±
1820	1,405		—
1830	5,650		302.1%
1840	8,685		53.7%
1850	10,836		24.8%
1860	18,122		67.2%
1870	14,981		−17.3%
1880	19,649		31.2%
1890	21,641		10.1%
1900	25,761		19.0%
1910	29,030		12.7%
1920	29,531		1.7%
1930	30,195		2.2%
1940	32,447		7.5%
1950	29,228		−9.9%
1960	24,560		−16.0%
1970	22,007		−10.4%
1980	21,680		−1.5%
1990	21,892		1.0%
2000	21,399		−2.3%
2010	20,947		−2.1%
2020	19,051		−9.1%
2025 (est.)	18,100	▼	−5.0%
U.S. Decennial Census; 1790–1960 1900–1990; 1990–2000 2010–2020

=== Racial and ethnic composition ===
Butler County, Alabama – Racial and ethnic composition Note: the US Census treats Hispanic/Latino as an ethnic category. This table excludes Latinos from the racial categories and assigns them to a separate category. Hispanics/Latinos may be of any race.
Race / Ethnicity (NH = Non-Hispanic)	Pop 2000	Pop 2010	Pop 2020	% 2000	% 2010	% 2020
White alone (NH)	12,429	11,324	9,679	58.08%	54.06%	50.81%
Black or African American alone (NH)	8,671	9,047	8,389	40.52%	43.19%	44.03%
Native American or Alaska Native alone (NH)	44	59	23	0.21%	0.28%	0.12%
Asian alone (NH)	34	174	143	0.16%	0.83%	0.75%
Pacific Islander alone (NH)	0	7	5	0.00%	0.03%	0.03%
Other race alone (NH)	4	3	46	0.02%	0.01%	0.24%
Mixed race or Multiracial (NH)	74	142	506	0.35%	0.68%	2.66%
Hispanic or Latino (any race)	143	191	260	0.67%	0.91%	1.36%
Total	21,399	20,947	19,051	100.00%	100.00%	100.00%

=== 2020 census ===
As of the 2020 census, the county had a population of 19,051. The median age was 43.5 years. 21.8% of residents were under the age of 18 and 21.5% of residents were 65 years of age or older. For every 100 females there were 89.0 males, and for every 100 females age 18 and over there were 82.9 males age 18 and over.

The racial makeup of the county was 51.2% White, 44.2% Black or African American, 0.2% American Indian and Alaska Native, 0.8% Asian, 0.0% Native Hawaiian and Pacific Islander, 0.6% from some other race, and 3.1% from two or more races. Hispanic or Latino residents of any race comprised 1.4% of the population.

30.6% of residents lived in urban areas, while 69.4% lived in rural areas.

There were 8,170 households in the county, of which 27.4% had children under the age of 18 living with them and 39.6% had a female householder with no spouse or partner present. About 34.1% of all households were made up of individuals and 16.4% had someone living alone who was 65 years of age or older.

There were 9,806 housing units, of which 16.7% were vacant. Among occupied housing units, 64.4% were owner-occupied and 35.6% were renter-occupied. The homeowner vacancy rate was 1.9% and the rental vacancy rate was 17.6%.

=== 2010 census ===
As of the 2010 United States census, there were 20,947 people living in the county. 54.4% were White, 43.4% Black or African American, 0.8% Asian, 0.3% Native American, 0.2% of some other race and 0.8% of two or more races. 0.9% were Hispanic or Latino (of any race).

=== 2000 census ===
As of the census of 2000, there were 21,399 people, 8,398 households, and 5,870 families living in the county. The population density was 28 people per square mile (11 people/km^{2}). There were 9,957 housing units at an average density of 13 units per square mile (5.0 units/km^{2}). The racial makeup of the county was 58.38% White, 40.81% Black or African American, 0.21% Native American, 0.16% Asian, 0.05% from other races, and 0.39% from two or more races. 0.67% of the population were Hispanic or Latino of any race.

There were 8,398 households, out of which 32.50% had children under the age of 18 living with them, 47.70% were married couples living together, 18.20% had a female householder with no husband present, and 30.10% were non-families. 27.50% of all households were made up of individuals, and 13.50% had someone living alone who was 65 years of age or older. The average household size was 2.52 and the average family size was 3.06.

In the county, the population was spread out, with 26.90% under the age of 18, 8.60% from 18 to 24, 25.10% from 25 to 44, 23.00% from 45 to 64, and 16.40% who were 65 years of age or older. The median age was 38 years. For every 100 females there were 88.00 males. For every 100 females age 18 and over, there were 82.90 males age 18 and over.

The median income for a household in the county was $24,791, and the median income for a family was $30,915. Males had a median income of $28,968 versus $18,644 for females. The per capita income for the county was $15,715. About 20.40% of families and 24.60% of the population were below the poverty line, including 31.30% of those under age 18 and 28.60% of those age 65 or over.

== Education ==
Butler County contains one public school district. There are approximately 3,000 students in public PK-12 schools in Butler County.

=== Districts ===
School districts include:

- Butler County School District

== Government ==
The last Democrat to win the county in a presidential election is Bill Clinton, who won it by a plurality in 1996.

United States presidential election results for Butler County, Alabama
Year	Republican		Democratic		Third party(ies)	
Year	No.	%	No.	%	No.	%
1904	83	8.69%	805	84.29%	67	7.02%
1908	137	15.15%	727	80.42%	40	4.42%
1912	86	7.90%	903	83.00%	99	9.10%
1916	78	6.24%	1,162	93.03%	9	0.72%
1920	153	10.40%	1,299	88.31%	19	1.29%
1924	95	7.54%	1,050	83.33%	115	9.13%
1928	699	36.14%	1,235	63.86%	0	0.00%
1932	74	3.13%	2,280	96.45%	10	0.42%
1936	83	3.39%	2,358	96.32%	7	0.29%
1940	52	1.87%	2,732	97.99%	4	0.14%
1944	80	4.00%	1,915	95.75%	5	0.25%
1948	91	6.46%	0	0.00%	1,318	93.54%
1952	1,087	30.81%	2,440	69.16%	1	0.03%
1956	1,324	37.48%	1,958	55.42%	251	7.10%
1960	1,231	29.87%	2,872	69.69%	18	0.44%
1964	4,002	80.44%	0	0.00%	973	19.56%
1968	500	6.79%	1,240	16.85%	5,621	76.36%
1972	4,685	76.45%	1,401	22.86%	42	0.69%
1976	2,909	40.36%	4,271	59.25%	28	0.39%
1980	3,810	45.53%	4,156	49.67%	402	4.80%
1984	4,941	56.73%	3,641	41.81%	127	1.46%
1988	3,923	52.59%	3,465	46.45%	71	0.95%
1992	3,494	41.21%	4,021	47.43%	963	11.36%
1996	3,352	43.14%	3,828	49.27%	590	7.59%
2000	4,127	52.89%	3,606	46.21%	70	0.90%
2004	4,979	59.16%	3,413	40.55%	24	0.29%
2008	5,485	56.49%	4,188	43.14%	36	0.37%
2012	5,087	53.54%	4,374	46.03%	41	0.43%
2016	4,901	56.13%	3,726	42.67%	105	1.20%
2020	5,458	57.53%	3,965	41.79%	65	0.69%
2024	5,172	60.99%	3,251	38.34%	57	0.67%

United States Senate election results for Butler County, Alabama2
Year	Republican		Democratic		Third party(ies)	
Year	No.	%	No.	%	No.	%
2020	5,232	55.45%	4,193	44.44%	11	0.12%

United States Senate election results for Butler County, Alabama3
Year	Republican		Democratic		Third party(ies)	
Year	No.	%	No.	%	No.	%
2022	3,789	64.12%	2,039	34.51%	81	1.37%

Alabama Gubernatorial election results for Butler County
Year	Republican		Democratic		Third party(ies)	
Year	No.	%	No.	%	No.	%
2022	3,856	65.00%	1,937	32.65%	139	2.34%

== Communities ==
=== City ===
- Greenville (county seat)

=== Towns ===
- Georgiana
- McKenzie

=== Unincorporated communities ===
- Bolling
- Chapman
- Forest Home
- Garland
- Industry
- Pine Flat
- Saucer
- Spring Hill
- Wald

== Notable people ==
- William Butler, militiaman during the Creek War
- Hilary A. Herbert, Secretary of the Navy under President Grover Cleveland
- William Lee, politician, judge, and militia officer
- Earnie Shavers, heavyweight boxer
- Janie Shores, Alabama Supreme Court justice
- Warren A. Thompson, explorer
- Hank Williams, country singer

== See also ==
- National Register of Historic Places listings in Butler County, Alabama
- Properties on the Alabama Register of Landmarks and Heritage in Butler County, Alabama
