= Georgiana, Alabama =

- Town
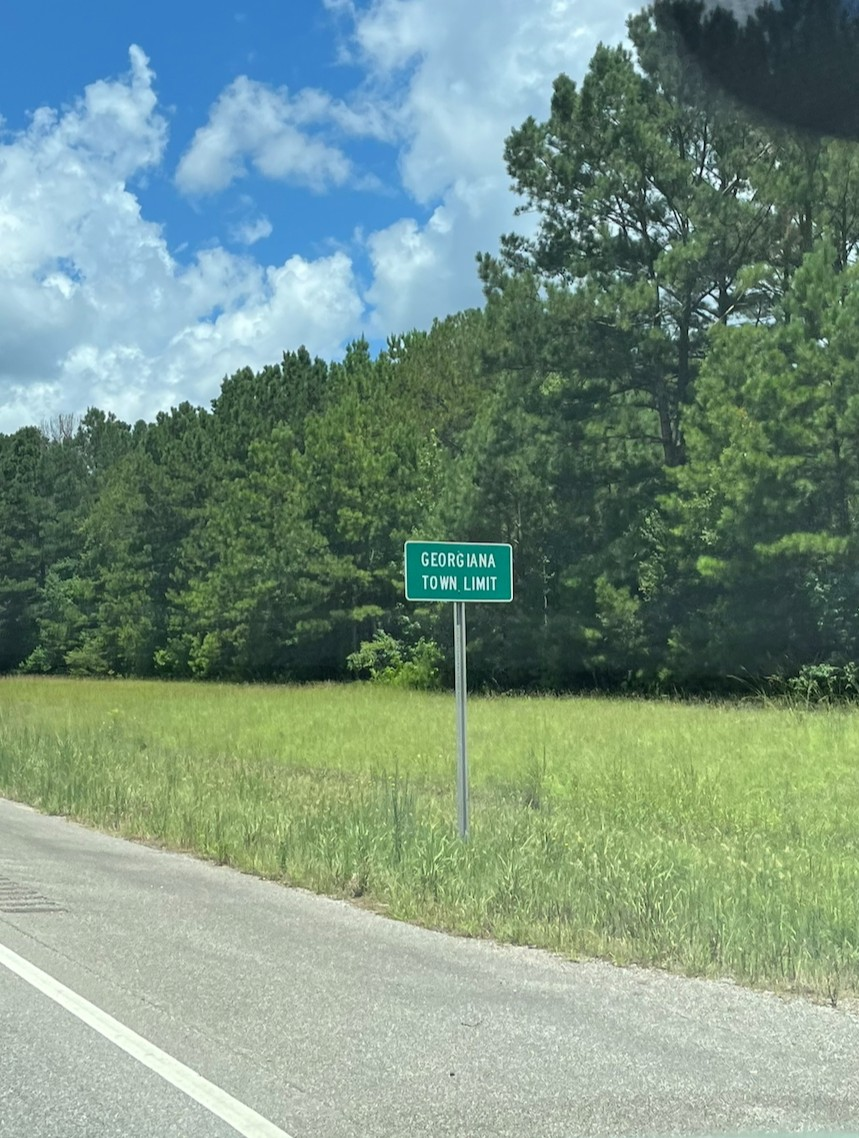
- Georgiana Town Limit sign

- Location of Georgiana in Butler County, Alabama.
- Coordinates: 31°38′04″N 86°45′15″W
- Country: United States
- State: Alabama
- County: Butler

Area
  - Total: 6.24 sq mi (16.15 km^{2})
  - Land: 6.24 sq mi (16.15 km^{2})
  - Water: 0 sq mi (0.00 km^{2})
- Elevation: 328 ft (100 m)

Population (2020)
  - Total: 1,324
  - Density: 212.3/sq mi (81.96/km^{2})
- Time zone: UTC-6 (Central (CST))
  - Summer (DST): UTC-5 (CDT)
- ZIP codes: 36033
- Area code: 334
- FIPS code: 01-29560
- GNIS feature ID: 2406560

Georgiana is a town in Butler County, Alabama, United States. As of the 2020 census, Georgiana had a population of 1,324.

== Geography ==
Georgiana is located in southern Butler County. Interstate 65 passes to the northwest of the town, with access from exit 114 (State Route 106). U.S. Route 31 (Mobile Road) passes through the east side of the town, leading north 16 miles (26 km) to Greenville, the county seat. Via I-65, it is 58 miles (93 km) north to Montgomery, the state capital, and 110 miles (180 km) southwest to Mobile.

According to the U.S. Census Bureau, the town has a total area of 6.3 square miles (16 km^{2}), all land.

== Demographics ==
Historical population
| Census | Pop. | Note | %± |
|---|---|---|---|
| 1880 | 277 | | — |
| 1890 | 456 | | 64.6% |
| 1900 | 567 | | 24.3% |
| 1910 | 999 | | 76.2% |
| 1920 | 1,550 | | 55.2% |
| 1930 | 1,480 | | −4.5% |
| 1940 | 1,627 | | 9.9% |
| 1950 | 1,596 | | −1.9% |
| 1960 | 2,093 | | 31.1% |
| 1970 | 2,148 | | 2.6% |
| 1980 | 1,993 | | −7.2% |
| 1990 | 1,933 | | −3.0% |
| 2000 | 1,737 | | −10.1% |
| 2010 | 1,738 | | 0.1% |
| 2020 | 1,324 | | −23.8% |
U.S. Decennial Census; 2013 Estimate

=== Racial and ethnic composition ===
Georgiana town, Alabama – Racial and ethnic composition Note: the US Census treats Hispanic/Latino as an ethnic category. This table excludes Latinos from the racial categories and assigns them to a separate category. Hispanics/Latinos may be of any race. Race and ethnicity was not surveyed for populations under 2,500 in the 1980 census and under 1,000 in 1990 census.
| Race / Ethnicity (NH = Non-Hispanic) | Pop 1990 | Pop 2000 | Pop 2010 | Pop 2020 | % 1990 | % 2000 | % 2010 | % 2020 |
|---|---|---|---|---|---|---|---|---|
| White alone (NH) | 837 | 646 | 576 | 321 | 43.30% | 37.19% | 33.14% | 24.24% |
| Black or African American alone (NH) | 1,073 | 1,070 | 1,134 | 960 | 55.51% | 61.60% | 65.25% | 72.51% |
| Native American or Alaska Native alone (NH) | 6 | 4 | 5 | 3 | 0.31% | 0.23% | 0.29% | 0.23% |
| Asian alone (NH) | 0 | 0 | 2 | 0 | 0.00% | 0.00% | 0.12% | 0.00% |
| Native Hawaiian or Pacific Islander alone (NH) | x | 0 | 2 | 0 | x | 0.00% | 0.12% | 0.00% |
| Other race alone (NH) | 0 | 0 | 0 | 1 | 0.00% | 0.00% | 0.00% | 0.08% |
| Mixed race or Multiracial (NH) | x | 11 | 14 | 30 | x | 0.63% | 0.81% | 2.27% |
| Hispanic or Latino (any race) | 17 | 6 | 5 | 9 | 0.88% | 0.35% | 0.29% | 0.68% |
| Total | 1,933 | 1,737 | 1,738 | 1,324 | 100.00% | 100.00% | 100.00% | 100.00% |

=== 2020 census ===
As of the 2020 census, Georgiana had a population of 1,324. The median age was 41.5 years. 22.5% of residents were under the age of 18 and 20.0% of residents were 65 years of age or older. For every 100 females there were 77.7 males, and for every 100 females age 18 and over there were 67.6 males age 18 and over.

0.0% of residents lived in urban areas, while 100.0% lived in rural areas.

There were 617 households in Georgiana, including 319 family households. Of all households, 27.4% had children under the age of 18 living in them. Of family households, 21.7% were married-couple households, 23.5% were households with a male householder and no spouse or partner present, and 51.5% were households with a female householder and no spouse or partner present. About 42.0% of all households were made up of individuals and 19.9% had someone living alone who was 65 years of age or older.

There were 768 housing units, of which 19.7% were vacant. The homeowner vacancy rate was 0.7% and the rental vacancy rate was 19.8%.

=== 2010 census ===
As of the census of 2010, there were 738 people, 249 households, and 220 families residing in the town. The population density was 279 inhabitants per square mile (108/km^{2}). There were 777 housing units at an average density of 123.3 per square mile (47.6/km^{2}). The racial makeup of the town was 65.4% Black or African American, 33.1% White, 0.3% Native American, and 0.8% from two or more races. 0.3% of the population were Hispanic or Latino of any race.

There were 249 households, out of which 25.9% had children under the age of 18 living with them, 34.1% were married couples living together, 25.0% had a female householder with no husband present, and 35.9% were non-families. 32.7% of all households were made up of individuals, and 16.2% had someone living alone who was 65 years of age or older. The average household size was 2.42 and the average family size was 3.06.

In the town, the age distribution of the population shows 21.3% under the age of 18, 8.2% from 18 to 24, 22.1% from 25 to 44, 24.2% from 45 to 64, and 24.1% who were 65 years of age or older. The median age was 43.3 years. For every 100 females, there were 82.2 males. For every 100 women age 18 and over, there were 88.8 men.

The median income for a household in the town was $38,694, and the median income for a family was $40,139. Males had a median income of $30,625 versus $28,519 for females. The per capita income for the town was $31,181. About 39.4% of families and 13.6% of the population were below the poverty line, including 54.1% of those under age 18 and 32.5% of those age 65 or over.

== Notable people ==
- Amasa Coleman Lee, Alabama lawyer and legislator
- Tom Morrow, former NFL safety for the Oakland Raiders
- Hank Williams, country music legend
- William Herbert York, bass player in Hank Williams' Drifting Cowboys band

== See also ==
- SS Georgiana, Confederate cruiser wrecked March 19, 1863, while attempting to run the U.S. Navy's blockade at Charleston, South Carolina
