= Thomas Brewer (activist) =

African-American physician and civil rights activist (1894–1956)

Thomas Hency Brewer, Sr. (1894–1956) was an African-American physician, who was instrumental in the civil rights movement in Columbus, Georgia during the early- to mid-twentieth century, before he was assassinated in 1956.

== Life and death ==
Brewer was born on November 19, 1894, in Saco, Alabama, graduated from Selma University in Selma, Alabama, then from Meharry Medical College in Nashville, Tennessee, and moved to Columbus, Georgia in 1920. He became a respected physician and one of Columbus' most prominent civil rights activists, succeeding in the desegregation of the Columbus, Georgia Police Department, being one of the founders of the city's NAACP chapter, and as a supporter of Primus King, among other advocacies. He was active in the Republican Party, serving as a delegate to the GOP National Convention in Philadelphia.

On July 4, 1944, Primus E. King, an African-American registered voter, went to the Muscogee County Courthouse in Columbus to cast his vote in the Democratic Party's primary election. He was turned away by law enforcement. Dr. Brewer encouraged and financially supported Mr. King in his lawsuit filed in federal court, styled King v. Chapman. In a landmark ruling, the court found in Mr. King's favor, deciding that the exclusion of black voters was unconstitutional. The U.S. Court of Appeals agreed, which ended the State of Georgia's "whites only" primaries.

=== Murder ===
Dr. Brewer shared an office building on First Street in Columbus with the F&B Department store, owned by Luico Flowers. In 1956, the two men witnessed a beating of a black man by police outside of the building. Dr. Brewer and Mr. Flowers argued about the incident: Dr. Brewer believed the police officer used excessive force and Mr. Flowers disagreed. About a week later, on February 18, 1956, Mr. Flowers shot Dr. Brewer seven times and killed him, claiming self-defense. The grand jury believed Mr. Flowers' account of the incident and he was not charged. A year later, Mr. Flowers was found shot with a gunshot wound to the head at the entrance a theater, in what authorities determined was a suicide. However, the United States Department of Justice said that Flowers had been murdered.

Approximately 2,500 mourners showed up for Dr. Brewer's funeral at the First African Baptist Church on Fifth Avenue.

Lillian "Bunky" McClung, the daughter of the first African-American mayor of Columbus, A. J. McClung, recalled the death of Dr. Brewer in a 2015 interview with the Columbus Ledger-Enquirer newspaper: "Dr. Brewer had been the person behind motivating the people in this community to want more. ... I remember that day he was shot. I remember when my daddy got that phone call and he ran out the door. ... There were several dentists, several doctors in the community ... they all left when Dr Brewer was shot." Brewer's wife and daughter left the city, as did Brewer's attorney and several other prominent physicians and businessmen, including Dr. W.G. McCoo, his spouse, Dr. Mary McCoo and their children, including their young daughter Marilyn McCoo.

A historical marker placed at the site of his assassination reads "Dr. Thomas H. Brewer - A Pike County, Alabama native of African-American descent, Dr. Brewer was born November 16, 1894. His office was located at 1025½ First Avenue. Brewer emerged as a chief spokesman for the civil rights of the Negro and was described by Roy Wilkins of the NAACP as a 'fearless champion of the rights of his people.' His goal to guarantee the Negro the right to vote throughout the State of Georgia and the South was achieved in the Primus King case in 1945. He was a leader of the local chapter of the NAACP and worked tirelessly for racial equality. Brewer was killed by gunshots February 18, 1956 near this site."

== Honors ==
Brewer Elementary School in Columbus is named in honor of Dr. Brewer.

By proclamation issued by the Mayor of Columbus and the Governor of Georgia in 1989, November 19 is designated as "Dr. Thomas H. Brewer, Sr. Day" in the State of Georgia.
