= Goshen High School =

Goshen High School may refer to:

- Goshen High School (Alabama), in Goshen, Alabama
- Goshen High School (Indiana), in Goshen, Indiana
- Goshen High School (Ohio), in Goshen, Ohio
- Goshen Central High School, in Goshen, New York
