= Pike County Schools =

Pike County Schools could refer to the following school districts in the United States:

- Pike County Schools (Alabama)
- Pike County Schools (Kentucky)
- Pike County School District in Georgia
