= Goshen, Alabama =

- Town
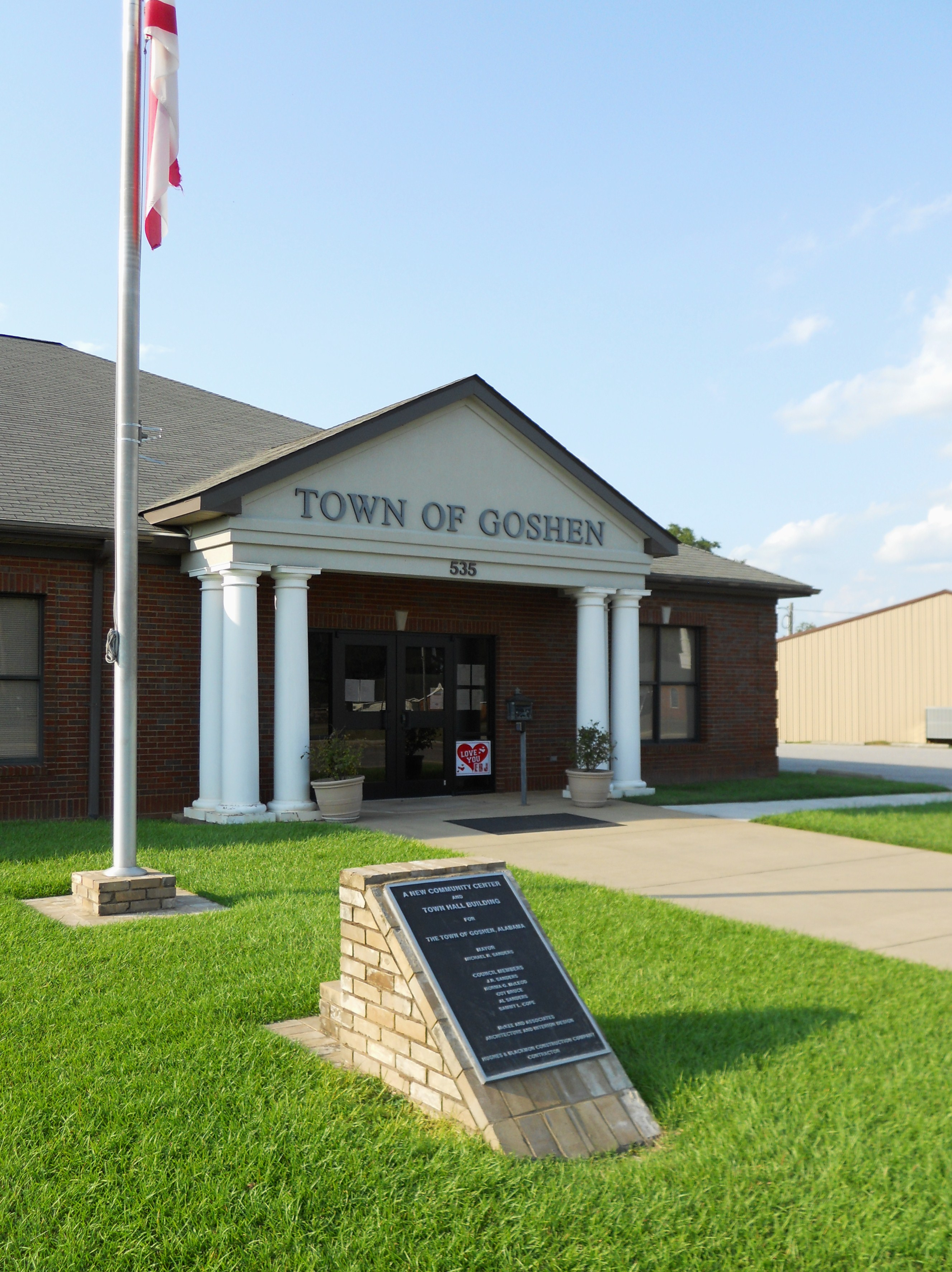
- The new community center and town hall building in Goshen, Alabama

- Location of Goshen in Pike County, Alabama.
- Coordinates: 31°43′06″N 86°07′38″W
- Country: United States
- State: Alabama
- County: Pike

Area
  - Total: 2.58 sq mi (6.67 km^{2})
  - Land: 2.56 sq mi (6.63 km^{2})
  - Water: 0.015 sq mi (0.04 km^{2})
- Elevation: 325 ft (99 m)

Population (2020)
  - Total: 269
  - Density: 105.0/sq mi (40.54/km^{2})
- Time zone: UTC-6 (Central (CST))
  - Summer (DST): UTC-5 (CDT)
- ZIP code: 36035
- Area code: 334
- FIPS code: 01-30880
- GNIS feature ID: 2406594

Goshen is a town in Pike County, Alabama, United States. As of the 2020 census, Goshen had a population of 269. It incorporated in 1907.

== History ==
A post office called Goshen has been in operation since 1839. The town was named after the biblical Land of Goshen.

== Geography ==
According to the U.S. Census Bureau, the town has a total area of 2.5 square miles (6.5 km^{2}), of which 2.5 square miles (6.5 km^{2}) is land and 0.40% is water.

== Demographics ==
Historical population
Census	Pop.	Note	%±
1910	347		—
1920	337		−2.9%
1930	367		8.9%
1940	356		−3.0%
1950	286		−19.7%
1960	260		−9.1%
1970	279		7.3%
1980	365		30.8%
1990	302		−17.3%
2000	300		−0.7%
2010	266		−11.3%
2020	269		1.1%
U.S. Decennial Census; 2013 Estimate

As of the census of 2000, there were 300 people, 138 households, and 85 families residing in the town. The population density was 119.4 inhabitants per square mile (46.1/km^{2}). There were 146 housing units at an average density of 58.1 per square mile (22.4/km^{2}). The racial makeup of the town was 67.67% White, 29.33% Black or African American and 3.00% Native American.

There were 138 households, out of which 23.2% had children under the age of 18 living with them, 47.8% were married couples living together, 8.7% had a female householder with no husband present, and 38.4% were non-families. 37.0% of all households were made up of individuals, and 18.8% had someone living alone who was 65 years of age or older. The average household size was 2.17 and the average family size was 2.86.

In the town, the population was spread out, with 23.3% under the age of 18, 5.0% from 18 to 24, 23.3% from 25 to 44, 26.3% from 45 to 64, and 22.0% who were 65 years of age or older. The median age was 44 years. For every 100 females, there were 89.9 males. For every 100 females age 18 and over, there were 88.5 males.

The median income for a household in the town was $24,219, and the median income for a family was $28,393. Males had a median income of $22,969 versus $15,000 for females. The per capita income for the town was $13,664. About 17.2% of families and 23.7% of the population were below the poverty line, including 39.0% of those under the age of eighteen and 15.9% of those 65 or over.

== Education ==
Goshen Public Schools are part of the Pike County Schools. Schools in the district include Goshen Elementary School, Pike County Elementary School, Banks Middle School, Goshen High School, Pike County High School and the Troy-Pike Center for Technology.

Goshen Elementary School (Alabama) and Goshen High School (Alabama) are located in Goshen.

Dr. Mark Bazzell is the Superintendent of Schools.

== Notable people ==
- Derrick Foster, running backs coach for three teams
- Mike Pelton, former NFL defensive tackle and current defensive line coach for the Kennesaw State Owls

== Gallery ==
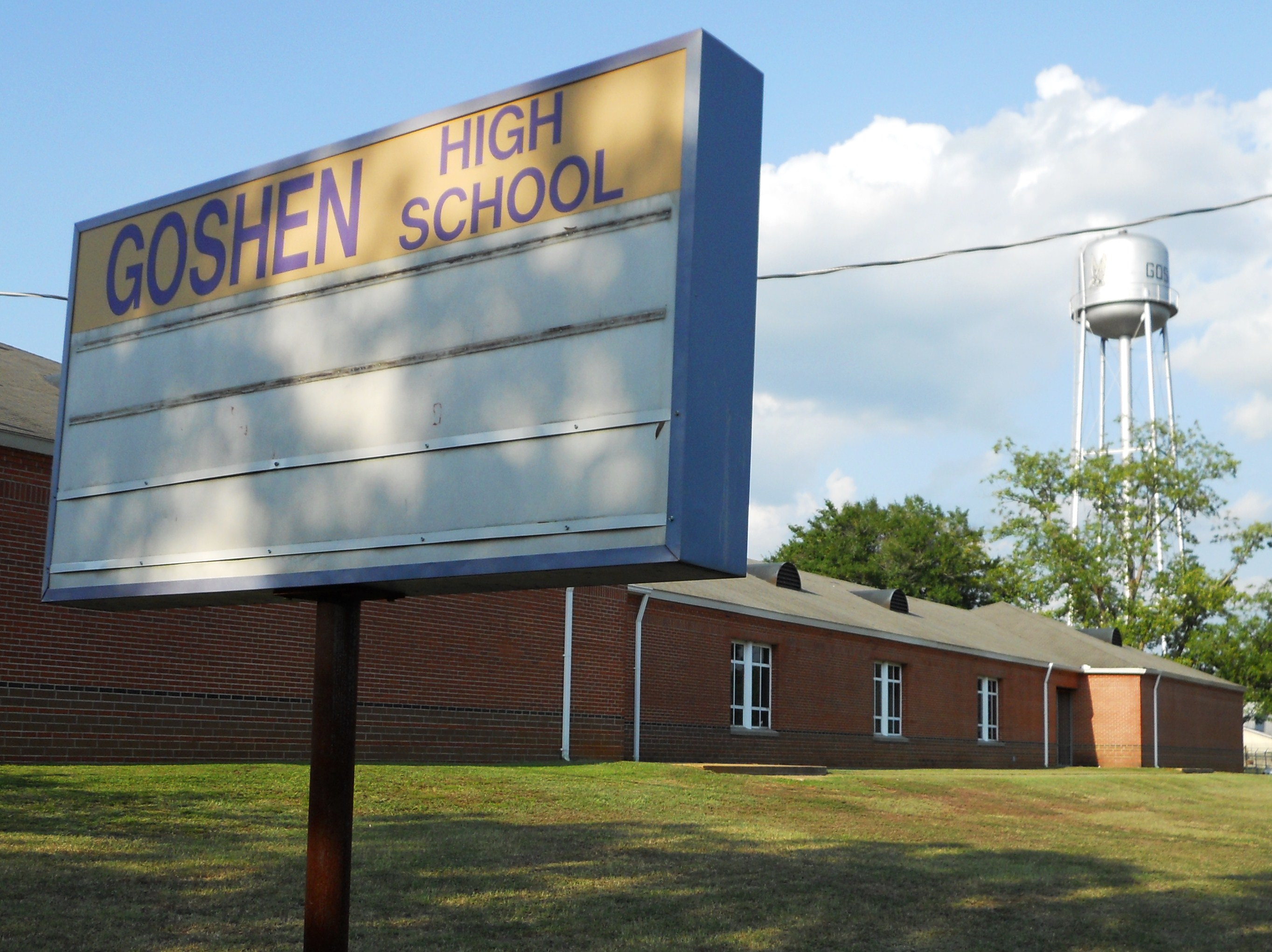
Goshen High School

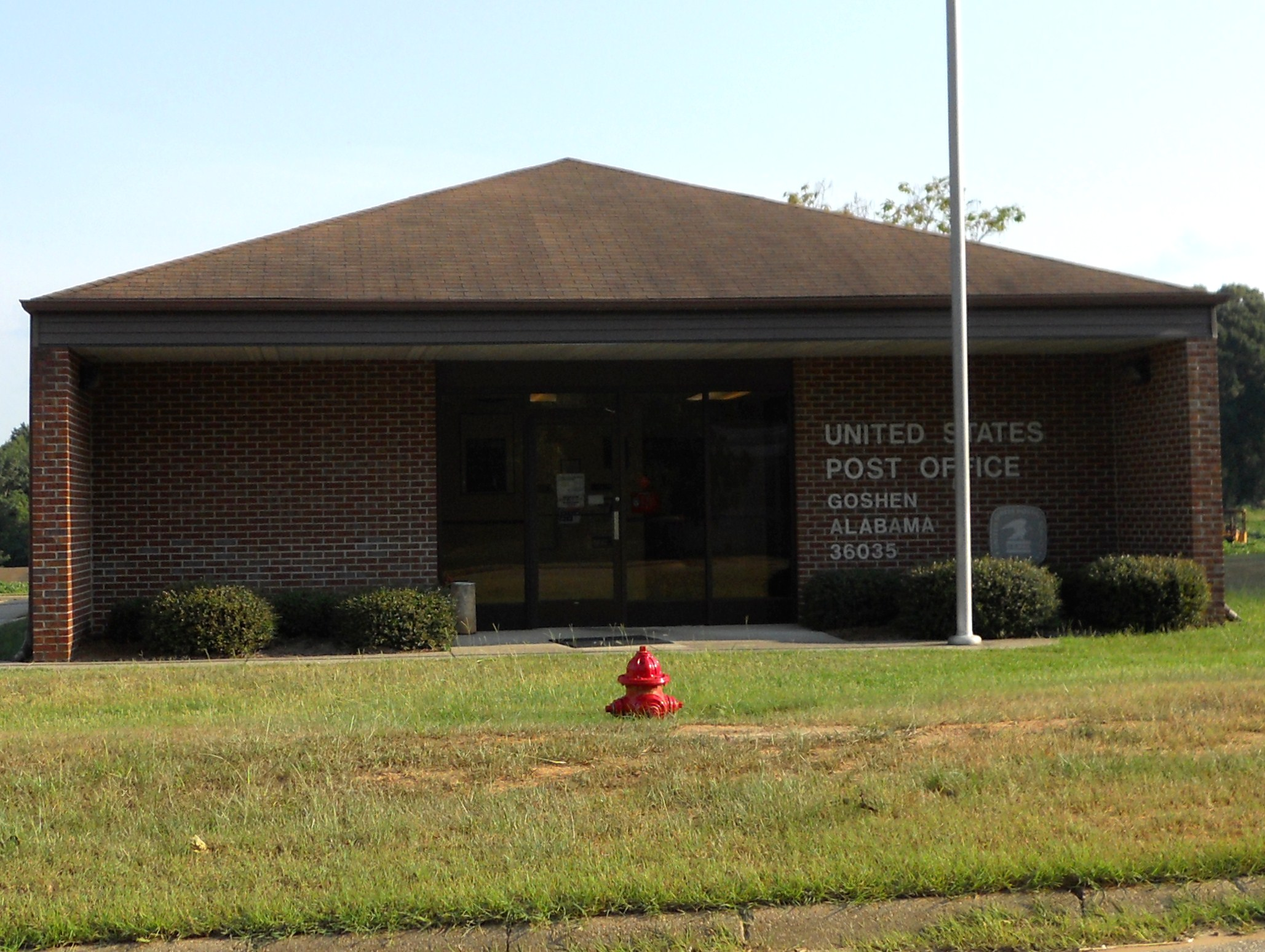
Goshen Post Office (ZIP Code: 36035)

== See also ==
- List of towns in Alabama
