= Black Heritage Trail (Columbus, Georgia) =

Coordinates: 32°27′40.0″N 84°59′17.5″W

The Black Heritage Trail is a National Recreation Trail located in Columbus, Georgia. The trail received National Recreation Trail Designation from the Secretary of the Interior during a 2000 ceremony at the historic Liberty Theater. The ceremony paid tribute to Ms. Judith Grant, a Black Heritage Trail organizer and local historian. It is an urban trail connecting 30 African American Heritage Points of interest. The Trail features many contributions and significant events in African American History of Columbus.

== Trail features ==
1. Ma Rainey Home
2. First African Baptist Church
3. St. John AME Church
4. Claflin School
5. Metropolitan Baptist Church
6. Restored Train Station
7. Saint James AME Church
8. Old City Jail
9. Friendship Baptist Church
10. The Liberty Theatre
11. Spencer High School
12. Porterdale Cemetery
13. Old Slave Cemetery
14. Fifth Avenue School
15. Mildred L. Terry Library
16. Fourth Street Baptist
17. The Spencer House
18. Columbus Urban League
19. Brick Streets Laid by Slaves
20. First Interracial Law Firm of Columbus
21. Primus King Site
22. Springer Opera House
23. Dr. Thomas H. Brewer Assassination Site
24. Site of first Silent store
25. Temperance Hall
26. Greater Shady Grove Baptist Church
27. City Mills
28. Isaac Maund House
29. Kinfolks Corner
30. Dillingham Street Bridge
