= Primus King =

Georgian (state) civil rights activist

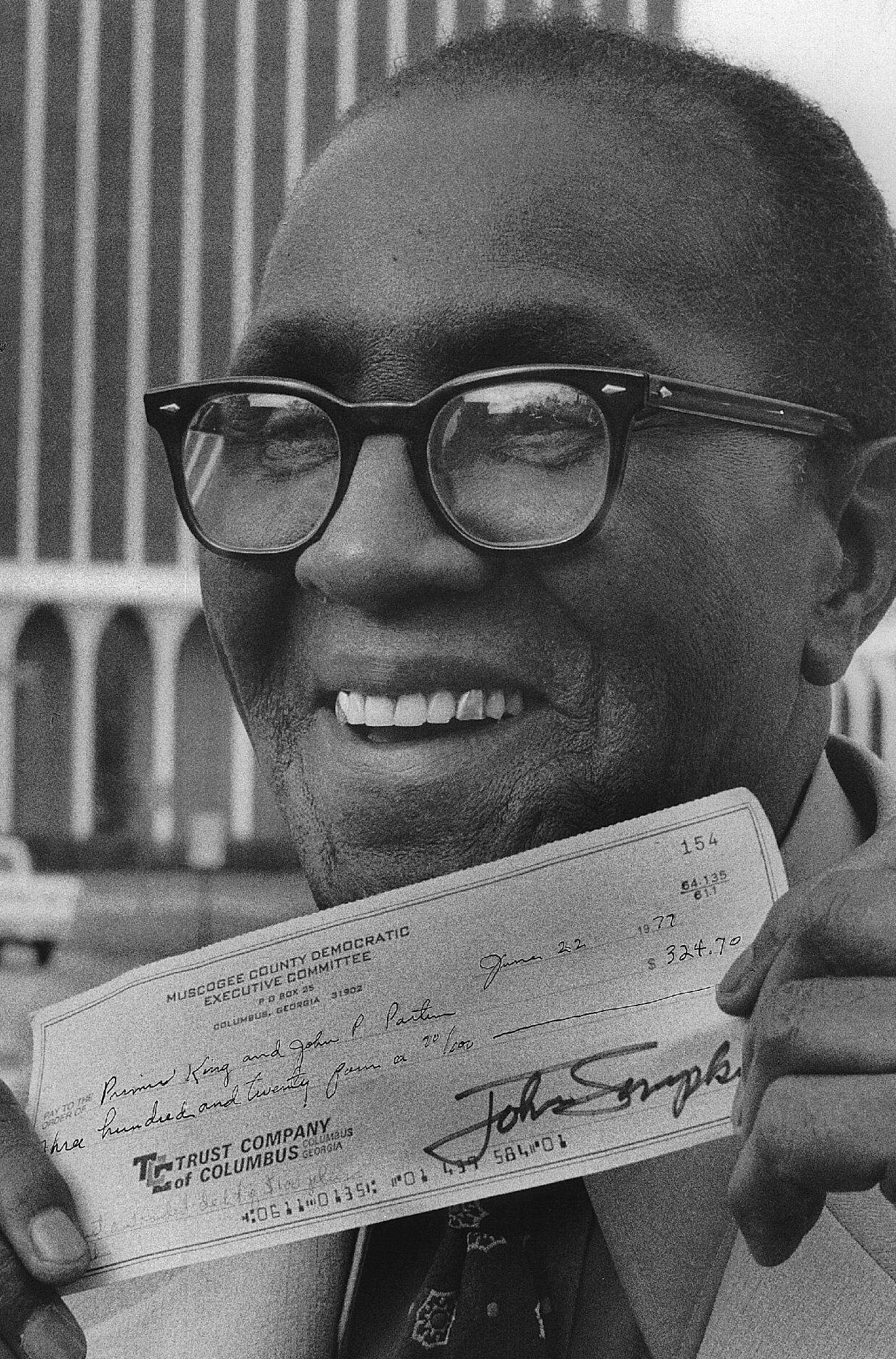
- King in 1977, holding the check he received from the Muscogee County Democratic Executive Committee for $324.70
- Born: February 5, 1900; Russell County, Alabama
- Died: November 3, 1986 (aged 86); Columbus, Georgia
- Occupations: Barber and minister
- Known for: King v. Chapman

Primus King (February 5, 1900–November 3, 1986) was a barber, minister, and activist involved in the civil rights movement in Columbus, Georgia. He served as the plaintiff in King v. Chapman which ruled white primaries unconstitutional in the state of Georgia.

== Early life ==
Primus King was born on February 5, 1900 near Hatchechubbee, Russell County, Alabama to sharecropper parents, Ed and Lucy King. The family moved to Columbus when King was 11 years old. He did not receive any formal education instead beginning work as a water boy at age 12 at the nearby cotton mill, Meritas Mill, with his father. After working at the mill for a few years, he became a butler for Molly Woodall for $8 a week (equivalent to $144 in 2025), later beginning to chauffeur for the family earning $9 a week.

Circa 1921, King left the employ of Molly Woodall and took a position as a chauffeur for Dan Joseph. It was during this time that he married his wife Genie Mae King. (Note: Her name is spelled as "Genie" in the New Georgia Encyclopedia and the Ledger-Enquirer, "Geenie" in King's obituary in The New York Times, and "Jeanie" in the transcript of an interview with Paul Allen Davis that appears in the Muscogee Genealogical Society's journal Muscogiana) After a confrontation in which Joseph cursed King for "allowing a Black woman selling vegetables door to door to speak to his wife," King left the Joseph's employ. Explaining his decision, he said, "I'm a man that loved my people, Black folks, and couldn't say that about them white people." Using savings, King purchased a barber shop because he wanted to be his "own boss." He bought the barber shop for $8 before knowing how to cut hair and charged ¢35 (equivalent to $6 in 2025) for a shave and a haircut. King learned from watching barbers at the 1st Avenue Sherald Barber Shop. He barbered for thirty years.

At 22 years old, King became a pastor after converting to Christianity at a revival meeting. He ministered first at Shady Grove Baptist Church in Columbus as an acting pastor. In 1939 he became pastor of Mt. Pleasant Baptist Church, also in Columbus, and remained there for 14 or 15 years. He also ministered at Salem Baptist Church.

== Activism ==
In early 1944, the Supreme Court of the United States ruled on Smith v. Allwright, setting a precedent for southern states allowing black people to vote. Dr. Thomas Brewer of Columbus, in defiance of the civil rights leaders in Atlanta organized and funded a challenge to the "Whites-only primaries" that were taking place in Georgia at the time. In an act of intentional protest, King, with the support of Columbus' civil rights activists, went to the Muscogee County courthouse to attempt to vote in the primary. When he entered the building, an unnamed law enforcement officer "roughly" grabbed King and removed him from the building. In a 1979 interview with Paul Allen Davis, King recalled the event,

When I went in, the detective grabbed me, asked "what in the hell are you doin’ nigger?" I say "I’m going to vote, sir." Detectives: "ain’t no niggers votin’ here today."

After being thrown out of the courthouse, King walked the three blocks to the attorney's office. A white attorney, Oscar D. Smith, worked with King to file a lawsuit in the Columbus Division of the United States District Court stating that excluding black voters from the primary was unconstitutional. National NAACP attorneys were not involved in the case until it had reached the national stage.

=== King v. Chapman et al. ===
Judge Thomas Hoyt Davis who had been newly appointed by President Franklin D. Roosevelt to the station of district judge for the Middle District of Georgia would hear the case. On October 12, 1945, Judge Davis heard the case. Oscar Smith and Harry Strozier represented King as the plaintiff. A. Edward Smith and Hall & Bloch (Note: Chas J. Bloch and Ellsworth Hall, Jr.) represented the defendants. The primary defendant named in the lawsuit was the Chairman of the Democratic Executive Committee of Muscogee County, Georgia, J. E. Chapman, Jr. Other defendants were the remaining members of the committee. In the lawsuit, King was seeking damages for "the alleged deprivation of his civil rights guaranteed to him by the Constitution and laws of the United States." Judge Davis ruled,

The defendants acting as the duly constituted authorities of the Democratic Party, in refusing to permit plaintiff to vote in the Primary of July 4, 1944, solely on account of his race and color, deprived the plaintiff of a right secured to him by the Constitution and laws of the United States, and was in violation of the Fourteenth, Fifteenth and Seventeenth Amendments.

Immediately following the ruling, the case was appealed which eventually led to it being heard by the U.S. Circuit Court of Appeals in New Orleans, Louisiana on March 6, 1946 by Judge Samuel H. Sibley, who upheld Judge Davis' ruling.

In 1946, after the U.S. Circuit Court decision upheld Judge Davis' decision, black people were able to vote in the Georgia state primaries for the first time. Veterans and civilians alike helped to organize groups to register black voters and challenge conservatives who wanted to uphold the "all-white" primaries. (Note: Brooks 2004, p. 7, 102.) Governor Eugene Talmadge campaigned to have the court decision to be overturned. He went so far as to make a campaign promise that he would begin his term as governor by sending a bill to the state legislature reinstating the "white-only" primary. (Note: Brooks 2004, p. 144.)

== Late life ==
At the age of 63, King retired and sold his barber shop. In 1973, then-Columbus Mayor Bob Hydrick proclaimed June 28 as Primus E. King day in Columbus. At 86, King died in Columbus on November 3, 1986.

== Legacy ==
King's activism allowed black voters in Georgia to begin to take steps towards equality. His lawsuit set a precedent for Georgia that removed a "significant legal barrier to black voting in the state."

In 2000, then-Georgia governor Roy Barnes signed into law a bill naming a state road as the Primus King Highway.

There is a park in Columbus, Georgia named Primus King Park and Recreation Center.

At the dedication of the Primus King historical marker in downtown Columbus on April 10, 2015 by the Georgia Historical Society, local scholar and historian Dr. Gary Sprayberry said,

Today, we honor one of those foot soldiers – Primus King – whose solitary brave act in July of 1944 helped to restore the vote for thousands of African Americans across Georgia, commencing a long march to freedom that would culminate with the passage of the Voting Rights Act in 1965.

== Citations ==
=== References ===
- Tuck, Stephen G. N. (2001). Beyond Atlanta. Athens [u.a.]University of Georgia Press: University of Georgia Press. ISBN 978-0-8203-2528-6.
- King, Primus (July 16, 1979). "An Interview with Primus King, Conducted by Paul A. Davis". Muscogiana (Interview). Interviewed by Davis, Paul Allen. Columbus, Georgia.
- Sprayberry, Gary S. (2018). Bunn, Mike; Dobson, Rachel (eds.). "Primus King and the Postwar Struggle for Voting Rights in Georgia: Remarks at the Dedication of the Primus King Historical Marker". MUSCOGIANA {{{!}}} Journal of the Muscogee Genealogical Society. 29 (1). Columbus State University: 12–16.
- Brooks, Jennifer E. (2004). Defining the Peace. Chapel Hill: Univ of North Carolina Press. ISBN 978-0-8078-5578-2.
