= Alabama State Route 93 =

State highway in Alabama, United States

State Route 93

Route information
- Maintained by ALDOT
- Length: 8.398 mi (13.515 km)

Major junctions
- South end: US 231 in Brundidge
- SR 10 in Brundidge; SR 201 south of Banks
- North end: US 29 in Banks

Location
- Country: United States
- State: Alabama
- Counties: Pike

Highway system
- Alabama State Highway System; Interstate; US; State
← SR 92	→ SR 94

State Route 93 (SR 93) is an 8.398-mile (13.515 km) state highway in Pike County, Alabama, United States, that serves as a connection between the towns of Brundidge and Banks.

== Route description ==
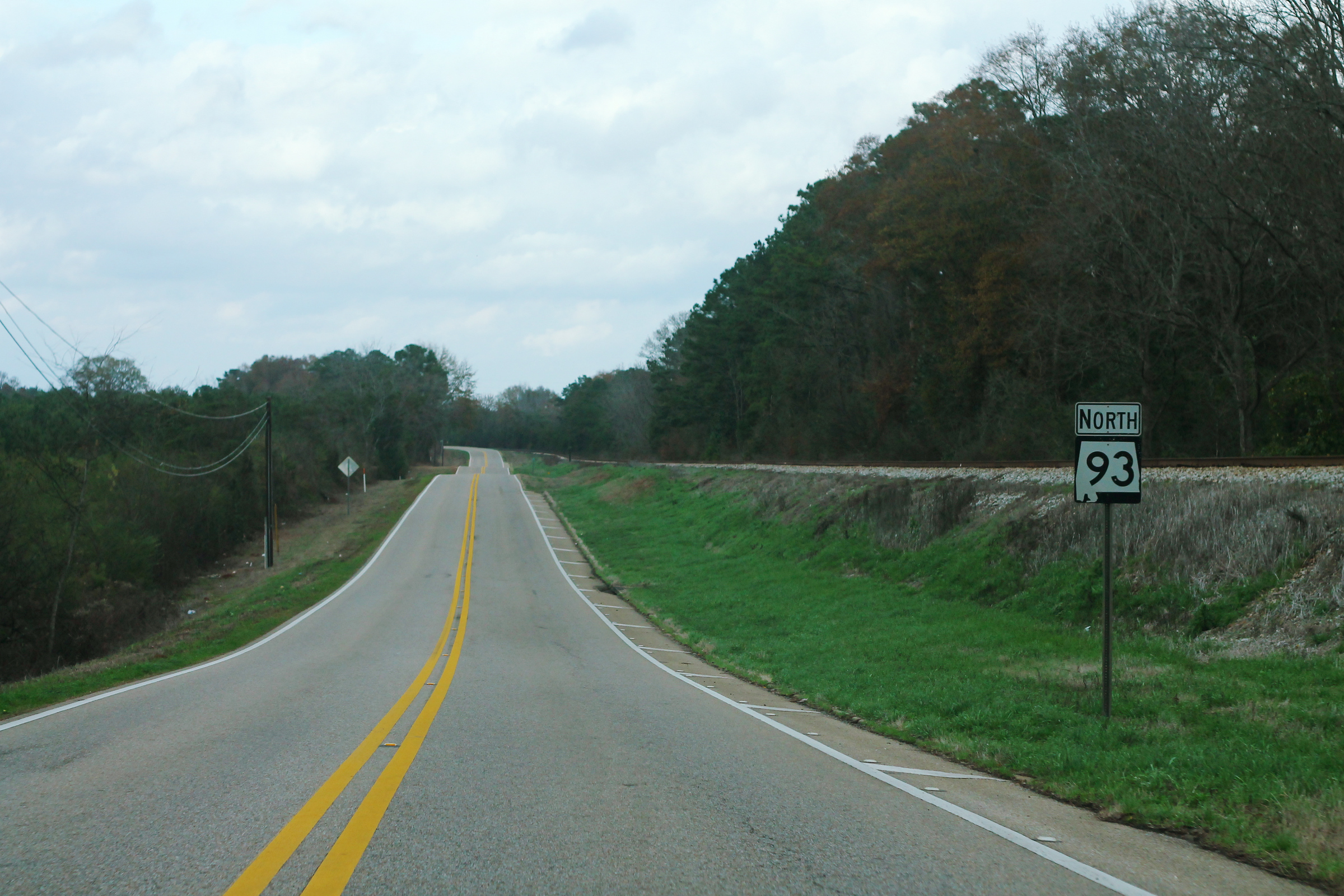
North on SR 93 in Brundidge, December 2013

SR 93 begins at an intersection with U.S. Route 231 (US 231) to the south of downtown Brundidge. From this point, the highway travels in a northerly direction before reaching its northern terminus at US 29 in Banks.

== Major intersections ==
The entire route is in Pike County.

Location	mi	km	Destinations	Notes
Brundidge	0.000	0.000	US 231 (SR 53) – Ozark, Dothan, Troy	Southern terminus
Brundidge	1.269	2.042	SR 10 (Troy Street)	
	6.494	10.451	SR 201 north / CR 5513	Southern terminus of SR 201
Banks	8.393	13.507	US 29 (SR 15) – Troy, Union Springs	Northern terminus
1.000 mi = 1.609 km; 1.000 km = 0.621 mi
