= Josie, Alabama =

- Unincorporated community
- Location within Alabama Location within the United States
- Coordinates: 31°52′12″N 85°43′08″W
- Country: United States
- State: Alabama
- County: Pike
- Elevation: 587 ft (179 m)
- Time zone: UTC-6 (Central (CST))
  - Summer (DST): UTC-5 (CDT)
- Area code: 334
- GNIS feature ID: 151930

Josie – also known as Upper Josie – is an unincorporated community in Pike County, Alabama, United States. It was named for Josie Lawson, who was the daughter of local merchant Joe Lawson. Josie was formerly served by a local school. A post office operated under the name Josie from 1881 to 1907.
