= Littleton Prince =

Littleton Prince (died 1833) was a white man executed by hanging in 1833 at Pike County, Alabama for having helped two runaway slaves.

The Alabama Department of Archives and History has a letter from the Montgomery County Sheriff informing the governor, John Gayle, that Littleton Prince had escaped from jail.

The case did not get much attention outside Alabama. In the state itself it seems to have been treated as a straightforward criminal case, rather than a politically controversial one. There is no reference to Prince having been a member of any abolitionist organization, or connected with the Underground Railroad. The assumption that helping a fugitive slave was a crime meriting capital punishment might have been connected with the alarm and panic felt throughout the slave states in the wake of Nat Turner's Rebellion two years earlier.

Abolitionists did not take up Prince as a martyr, either at the time or during the later three decades. The story of his life and death remained obscure even at the time when slavery in general and aid to fugitive slaves in particular became a central controversial issue on the American political agenda.

It is unclear whether Prince was an abolitionist. The ESPY execution database reports him as potentially innocent. Prince was accused of stealing two slaves, one of whom he said he sold on his way to the city. He was walking with the other slave when he was confronted by the owner, who accused him of slave stealing. Prince maintained his innocence, and the slave supported this claim.
