= Saco, Alabama =

Community in Pike County, Alabama

Saco
- Unincorporated Community
- Location in Alabama.
- Coordinates: 31°57′18″N 85°49′14″W
- Country: United States
- State: Alabama
- County: Pike
- Elevation: 381 ft (116 m)
- Time zone: UTC-6 (CST)
  - Summer (DST): UTC-5 (CDT)
- Area codes: Area code 334

Saco is an unincorporated community in Pike County, Alabama. It is located 13 miles northeast of Troy, Alabama.

== History ==
The name Saco is possibly derived from the name of a local business. A post office was established as Saco in 1905, and remained in operation until it was discontinued in 1960.

== Notable person ==
Thomas Brewer, a civil rights activist, was born in Saco.
