= Alabama State Route 201 =

State highway in Pike County, Alabama, United States

State Route 201

Route information
- Maintained by ALDOT
- Length: 1.553 mi (2.499 km)

Major junctions
- South end: SR 93 near Banks
- North end: US 29 in Banks

Location
- Country: United States
- State: Alabama
- Counties: Pike

Highway system
- Alabama State Highway System; Interstate; US; State
← SR 199	→ SR 202

State Route 201 (SR 201) is a 1.553-mile (2.499 km) state highway in Pike County, Alabama, United States, that serves as an eastern bypass around the town of Banks.

== Route description ==
The southern terminus of SR 201 is located at its intersection with SR 93 southeast of Banks. From this point, the route travels in a northerly direction before reaching its northern terminus at US 29 east of Banks.

== Major intersections ==
The entire route is in Pike County.

Location	mi	km	Destinations	Notes
	0.000	0.000	SR 93 – Brundidge, Banks	Southern terminus
Banks	1.553	2.499	US 29 (SR 15) – Banks, Union Springs	Northern terminus
1.000 mi = 1.609 km; 1.000 km = 0.621 mi
