= Tennille, Alabama =

Community southeast of Troy, Alabama

Tennille
- Unincorporated Community
- Location in Alabama.
- Coordinates: 31°37′23″N 85°46′6″W
- Country: United States
- State: Alabama
- County: Pike
- Elevation: 305 ft (93 m)
- Time zone: UTC-6 (Central (CST))
  - Summer (DST): UTC-5 (Central (CST))
- Area codes: Area code 334
- GNIS feature ID: 127762

Tennille, also spelled as Tennile is an unincorporated community in Pike County, Alabama. It is located 17 miles southeast of Troy, Alabama.

== History ==
Tennille is named for St. Clair Tennille, a railroad promoter from Troy. A grist mill operated in Tennille in 1886. Tennille was incorporated in 1901 and disincorporated at a later date. A post office was established as Tennile in 1890, and remained in operation until it was discontinued in 1958.

== Geography ==
Tennille is just over one mile north of the Pea River, which separates Pike County from Dale County.
