= Goshen High School (Alabama) =

Coordinates: 31.72293°N 86.12413°W

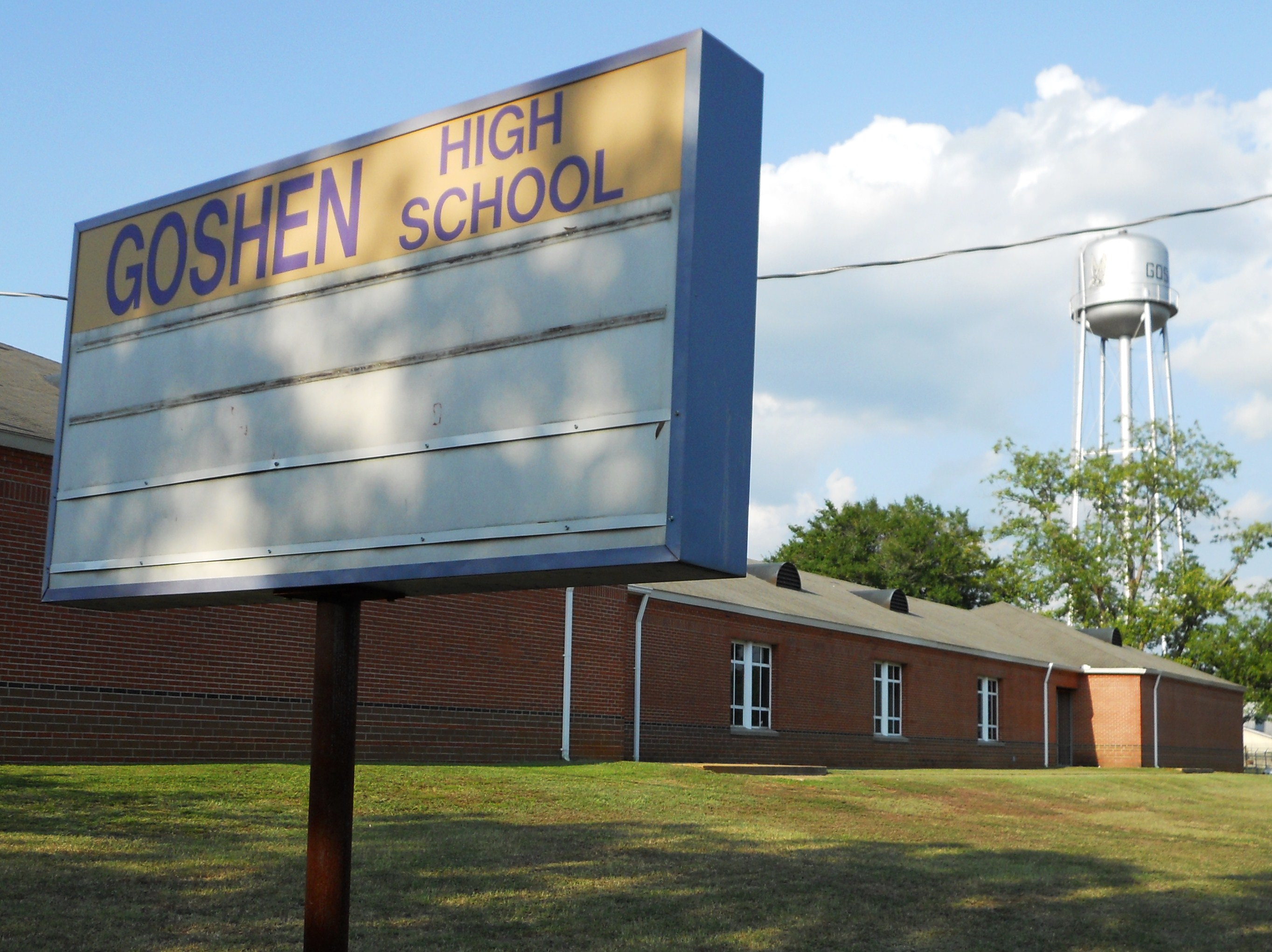

Location
- 286 Eagle Circle; Goshen, Alabama 36035; United States

Information
- Type: Public
- Established: 1897 (129 years ago)
- School district: Pike County Schools
- CEEB code: 011270
- Principal: Ms. Lane
- Teaching staff: 25.00 (on an FTE basis)
- Grades: 7–12
- Enrollment: 361 (2023–2024)
- Average class size: 20
- Student to teacher ratio: 14.44
- Schedule: 7:35 AM to 3:08 (3:08 - 3:12) PM
- Campus type: Small town area
- Colors: Dark purple and Old gold
- Mascot: Eagle
- Website: www.goshenhs.com

Goshen High School is a secondary school located at 101 Eagle Circle in Goshen, Alabama.

== Community ==
Goshen is located about 10 miles (16 km) west of Troy, and 10 miles east of Luverne. The earliest record of a public school in Goshen was in the middle 19th century. A small wooden structure made from hand-split logs was located between Goshen and the Troy-Luverne Highway (U.S. Route 29) on a parcel of land called "Goshen Hill". This is what is now known as Mt. Zion Community. This first public school in Goshen was a one-room building with one teacher. The school term was whenever the students were not busy on the farm. The school was moved to its present site in the town of Goshen in 1897 and employed its first principal, Miss Ada Ray, about 1920. Goshen High School has grown continually over the past number of years, and has over 200 students in grades seven through twelve. The current principal is Bennie Shellhouse.

== Teaching grades ==
- mid-19th century to 1897 Grades (6 - 12)
- (Goshen Location) 1897 to 2004 Grades (6 - 12)
- 2004 to present (7 - 12)

== ARMT results ==
Scale: % meeting or exceeding standards

=== Grade 7 ===
Reading 63% (2006) 68% (2005) The state average for Reading was 74% in 2006.

Math 45% (2006) 52% (2005) The state average for Math was 59% in 2006.

Source: Alabama Dept. of Education, 2005–2006

=== Grade 8 ===
Reading 60% (2006) 65% (2005) 31% (2004) The state average for Reading was 72% in 2006.

Math 67% (2006) 54% (2005) The state average for Math was 68% in 2006.

Source: Alabama Dept. of Education, 2005–2006

== Notable alumni ==
- Derrick Foster, NFL running backs coach for the New Orleans Saints
- Mike Pelton, Former NFL player and current defensive line coach for the Georgia Tech Yellow Jackets
- Wesley Wright, Former MLB relief pitcher
