= Derrick Foster =

American football coach (born 1986)

Dallas Cowboys
- Title: Running backs coach

Personal information
- Born: March 6, 1986 (age 40); Goshen, Alabama, U.S.
- Listed height: 5 ft 8 in (1.73 m)
- Listed weight: 170 lb (77 kg)

Career information
- Position: Wide receiver
- High school: Goshen (AL) (Goshen, Alabama)
- College: Southwest Baptist (2007–2010)

Career history
- Valdosta State (2011) Graduate assistant; Tennessee (2012) Graduate assistant; Northwestern State (2013) Running backs coach; Northwestern State (2014–2015) Wide receivers coach; Samford (2016–2017) Run game coordinator & running backs coach; Iowa (2018) Running backs coach; Iowa (2019–2020) Running backs coach & offensive recruiting coordinator; Los Angeles Chargers (2021–2023) Running backs coach; New Orleans Saints (2024) Running backs coach; Dallas Cowboys (2025–present) Running backs coach

Derrick Foster (born March 6, 1986) is an American football coach and former player who is currently the running backs coach for the Dallas Cowboys of the National Football League (NFL).

== Early life ==
Foster was born in Goshen, Alabama on March 6, 1986. He played for the Goshen High School football team as a running back and was an All-County running back for the Eagles, surpassing 1,000 yards on the ground as a senior. In his senior year he was nominated to play in the Mississippi-Alabama All-Star Game. He began playing on the varsity team during 7th grade.

== College career ==
After high school, Foster earned a scholarship to Southwest Baptist University where he would transition from running back to wide receiver. In four years, he tallied 2,062 all-purpose yards and four touchdowns. After graduating, he took a job working at the SMART Plant in Luverne, where both his father and older brother worked.

== Coaching career ==
=== Early coaching ===
In 2011, Foster reached out to Valdosta State University offensive coordinator Robby Brown, who was his offensive coordinator in college. Foster served as a graduate assistant at Valdosta State in 2011 while he pursued a master’s degree in sports management. In 2012, Foster moved to an offensive assistant role with Tennessee, helping to coach running backs. He would then spend the next three years at Northwestern State, initially as a running backs coach before moving to a role coaching wide receivers.

=== Samford ===
In 2016, Foster took a job as the run game coordinator and running backs coach at Samford, helping lead the Bulldogs to two straight FCS playoff appearances.

=== Iowa ===
In 2018, Foster took a job as the running backs coach of the Iowa Hawkeyes. In 2020, he also became the offensive recruiting coordinator for the team, helping to reestablish recruiting efforts in the South.

In 2020, he helped to coach sophomore running back, Tyler Goodson, into a first-team all-Big Ten Conference player. Iowa's first running back to achieve the honor since 2008.

=== Los Angeles Chargers ===
In 2021, Foster joined the Los Angeles Chargers as a running backs coach. He had previously worked with Chargers head coach, Brandon Staley, as a graduate assistant at Tennessee. Under the direction of Foster, Chargers running back Austin Ekeler totaled 44 regular-season scrimmage touchdowns, ranking first in the NFL over that span and leading the league in his first two seasons. Ekeler's 228 receptions for 1,805 yards with 14 touchdowns led NFL running backs in catches and receiving yardage over the three-season span under Foster's direction, while tying for first in touchdown grabs.

=== New Orleans Saints ===
On February 21, 2024, New Orleans Saints head coach Dennis Allen announced that Foster had been hired as the Saints running backs coach.

=== Dallas Cowboys ===
On February 3, 2025, the Dallas Cowboys hired Foster as their running backs coach.

== Personal life ==
Foster is the son of Robert Gamble and Dorothy Foster. He graduated with a bachelor’s degree in sports management from Southwest Baptist in 2010 and a master’s in public administration from Valdosta State University awarded in 2013.

He and his wife, Bianca, have two children, Cooper and Brielle.
