= Shady Grove, Alabama =

- Unincorporated community
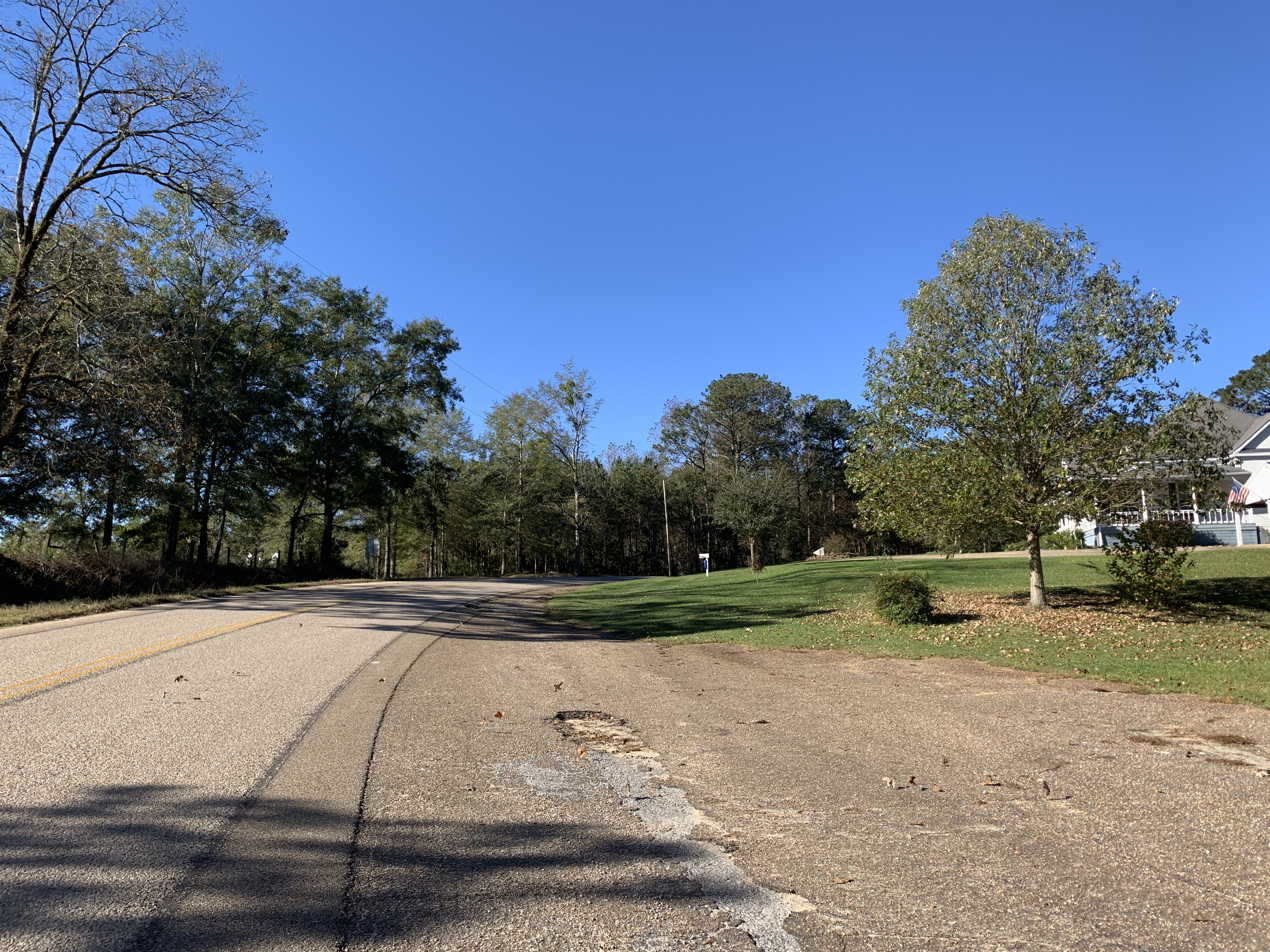

- Location within Alabama Location within the United States
- Coordinates: 31°54′35″N 86°09′45″W
- Country: United States
- State: Alabama
- County: Pike
- Elevation: 433 ft (132 m)
- Time zone: UTC-6 (Central (CST))
  - Summer (DST): UTC-5 (CDT)
- Area code: 334
- GNIS feature ID: 153379

Shady Grove, also known as Chesser, is an unincorporated community in Pike County, Alabama, United States.

== History ==
Shady Grove was originally known as Chesser in honor of Jim Chesser, an early settler. The name was then changed to Shady Grove in honor of Shady Grove Methodist Church. A post office operated under the name Chesser from 1880 to 1890.

== In popular culture ==
- Ethel Cain, the fictional protagonist of Hayden Anhedönia's album trilogy, was born, and grew up here.
