= Mike Pelton =

American football player and coach (born 1971)

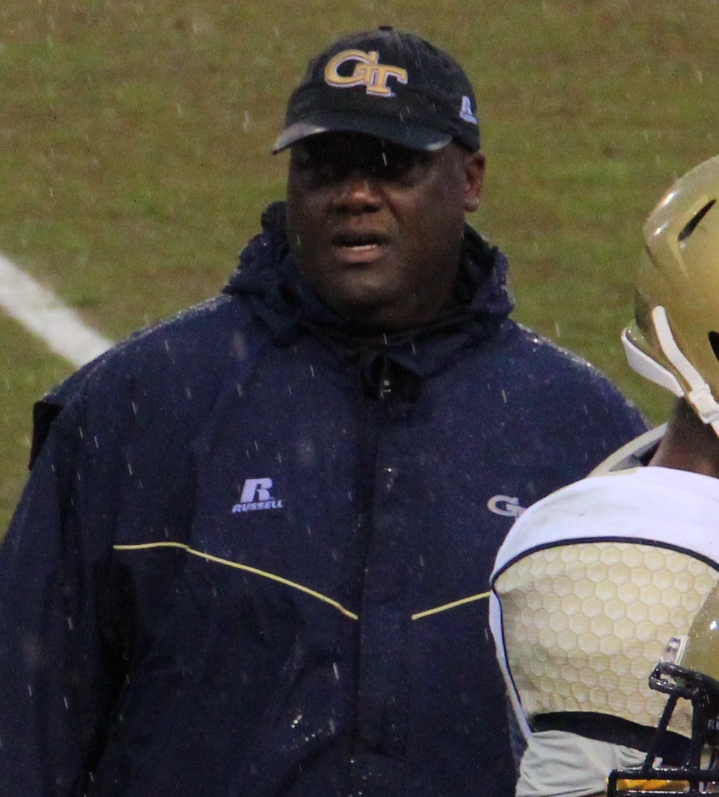
- Pelton in 2014

Biographical details
- Born: December 13, 1971 (age 54); Goshen, Alabama, U.S.

Playing career
- 1990–1994: Auburn
- 1995: Kansas City Chiefs*
- 1995: Indianapolis Colts
- Position: Defensive line

Coaching career (HC unless noted)
- 1999: Troy (GA)
- 2000: Valdosta State (DL)
- 2001–2006: Troy (DL)
- 2007–2008: Iowa State (DL)
- 2009: Oak Mountain HS (AL) (DL)
- 2010: Vanderbilt (DE)
- 2011–2012: Auburn (DL/DE)
- 2013–2017: Georgia Tech (DL)
- 2023: Sewanee (DC)
- 2024: Kennesaw State (DL)

Accomplishments and honors

Awards
- Second-team All-American (1994); First-team All-SEC (1994)

Michael Pelton (born December 13, 1971) is an American college football coach and former player. He was most recently the defensive line coach for Kennesaw State University, a position he held in 2024. He also coached for Troy, Valdosta State, Iowa State, Oak Mountain High School, Vanderbilt, Auburn, and Georgia Tech. He played college football for Auburn as a defensive lineman and was drafted in the fifth round of the 1995 NFL draft by the Kansas City Chiefs of the National Football League (NFL).

== Sources ==
- Sewanee profile
- Georgia Tech profile
- Iowa State profile
- Auburn coach profile
- Auburn player profile
