= Pike County, Alabama =

County in Alabama, United States

- County
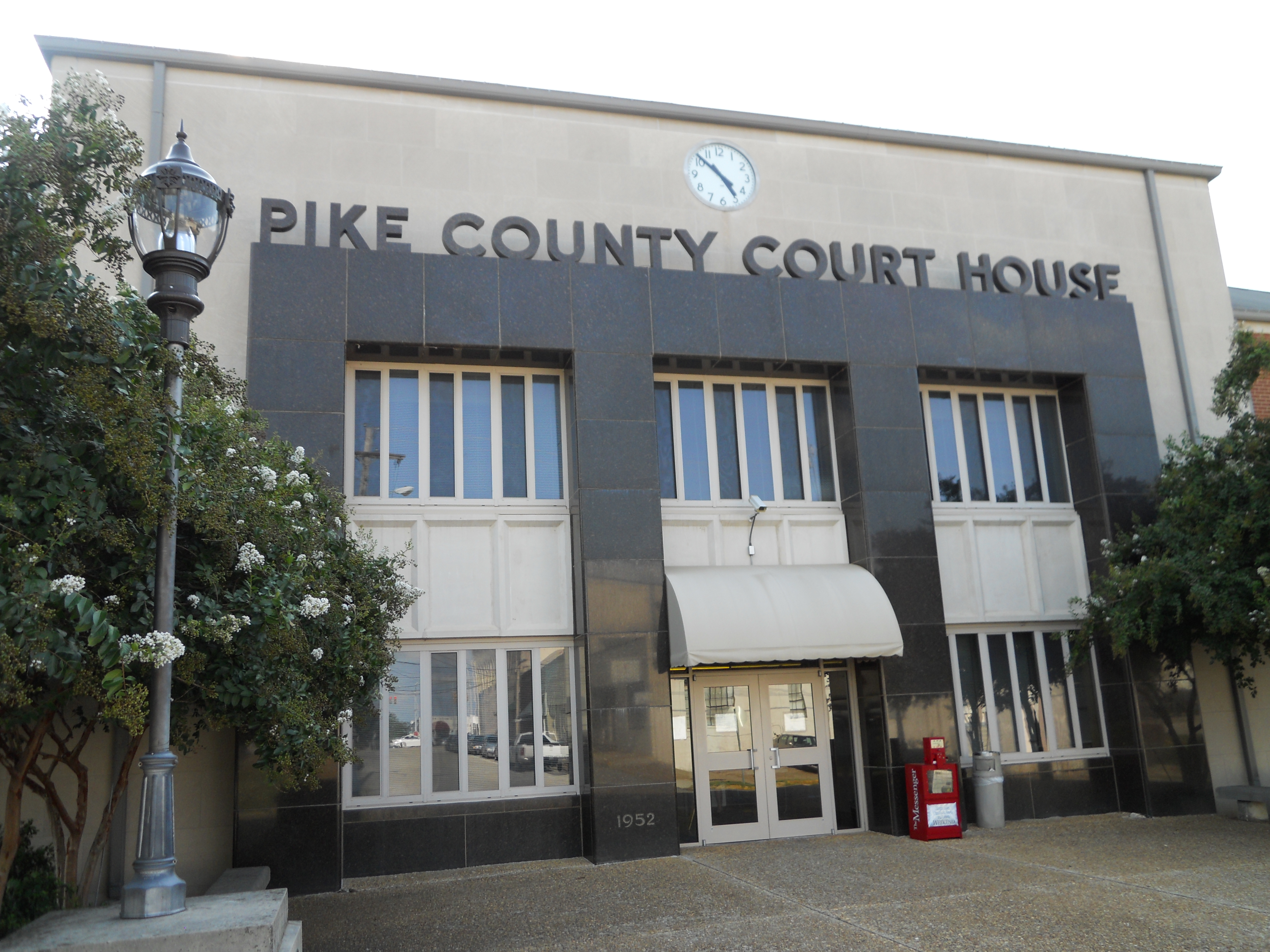
- Pike County Courthouse in Troy

- Seal

- Location within the U.S. state of Alabama
- Coordinates: 31°47′57″N 85°56′19″W
- Country: United States
- State: Alabama
- Founded: December 17, 1821
- Named for: Zebulon Pike
- Seat: Troy
- Largest city: Troy

Area
  - Total: 673 sq mi (1,740 km^{2})
  - Land: 672 sq mi (1,740 km^{2})
  - Water: 0.9 sq mi (2.3 km^{2}) 0.1%

Population (2020)
  - Total: 33,009
  - Estimate (2025): 33,688 ▲
  - Density: 49.1/sq mi (19.0/km^{2})
- Time zone: UTC−6 (Central)
  - Summer (DST): UTC−5 (CDT)
- Congressional district: 2nd
- Website: www.pikecommission.com
- County Number 55 on Alabama Licence Plates

Pike County is a county located in the U.S. state of Alabama. As of the 2020 census the population was 33,009. Its county seat is Troy. Its name is in honor of General Zebulon Pike, of New Jersey, who led an expedition to southern Colorado and encountered Pikes Peak in 1806.

Pike County comprises the Troy, AL Micropolitan Statistical Area.

== History ==
The area of present-day Pike County was inhabited by Native Americans from prehistoric times. Spain, France, and Great Britain all claimed the area, but except for scattered military outposts like Fort Toulouse near present-day Wetumpka, European inhabitants were concentrated along the Gulf Coast, with very few settling inland. In 1763, at the close of the French and Indian War, France ceded all the territories of New France (including what is now Pike County, Spanish claims notwithstanding) to the victorious British. In the same year, the Royal Proclamation of 1763 prohibited British subjects from settling in this area, which was reserved for the native peoples.

A map from 1767 of British West Florida, including the area of present-day Pike County

Between the years of 1767 and 1783, the area that is now Pike County was part of the colony of British West Florida, though still with nearly all whites concentrated in the settlements along the coast or near the Mississippi River. After the American victory in the Revolutionary War, the British ceded the territory to Spain, an American ally. However, Spain and the United States both claimed the region fell until Spain gave up its claims to the land north of the 31st parallel (present-day border of Alabama and Florida) in the Treaty of Madrid (1795). The United States organized the entire region north of that border and east of Georgia as the Mississippi Territory. In 1812, following the Louisiana Purchase, the United States unilaterally annexed the Mobile District from Spanish West Florida, most of the rest of which was acqurired with the Adams–Onís Treaty of 1819 (ratified 1821).

In 1817, the Mississippi Territory was divided, with the western part admitted to the Union as the State of Mississippi; the remainder was admitted as the State of Alabama in 1819, and was soon organized into counties. Pike County is one of the oldest in the state, organized on December 17, 1821. The temporary county seat was established at the house of Andrew Townsend. Pike County comprised a large tract of country, so large that it was called the State of Pike, including a part of what are now Crenshaw, Montgomery, Macon, Bullock, and Barbour counties, and extended to the Chattahoochee River on the east.

== Geography ==
According to the United States Census Bureau, the county has a total area of 673 square miles (1,740 km^{2}), of which 672 square miles (1,740 km^{2}) is land and 0.9 square miles (2.3 km^{2}) (0.1%) is water.

=== Major highways ===
- U.S. Highway 29 / State Route 15 (unsigned)
- U.S. Highway 231 / State Route 53 (unsigned)
- State Route 10
- State Route 87
- State Route 93
- State Route 125
- State Route 130
- State Route 167
- State Route 201
- State Route 223

=== Transit ===
- Pike Area Transit System (PATS) provides demand-response service.

=== Adjacent counties ===
- Bullock County (northeast)
- Barbour County (east)
- Dale County (southeast)
- Coffee County (south)
- Crenshaw County (west)
- Montgomery County (northwest)

== Demographics ==
Historical population
| Census | Pop. | Note | %± |
|---|---|---|---|
| 1830 | 7,108 | | — |
| 1840 | 10,108 | | 42.2% |
| 1850 | 15,920 | | 57.5% |
| 1860 | 24,435 | | 53.5% |
| 1870 | 17,423 | | −28.7% |
| 1880 | 20,640 | | 18.5% |
| 1890 | 24,423 | | 18.3% |
| 1900 | 29,172 | | 19.4% |
| 1910 | 30,815 | | 5.6% |
| 1920 | 31,631 | | 2.6% |
| 1930 | 32,240 | | 1.9% |
| 1940 | 32,493 | | 0.8% |
| 1950 | 30,608 | | −5.8% |
| 1960 | 25,987 | | −15.1% |
| 1970 | 25,038 | | −3.7% |
| 1980 | 28,050 | | 12.0% |
| 1990 | 27,595 | | −1.6% |
| 2000 | 29,605 | | 7.3% |
| 2010 | 32,899 | | 11.1% |
| 2020 | 33,009 | | 0.3% |
| 2025 (est.) | 33,688 | ▲ | 2.1% |
U.S. Decennial Census; 1790–1960 1900–1990; 1990–2000 2010–2020

=== Racial and ethnic composition ===
Pike County, Alabama – Racial and ethnic composition Note: the US Census treats Hispanic/Latino as an ethnic category. This table excludes Latinos from the racial categories and assigns them to a separate category. Hispanics/Latinos may be of any race.
| Race / Ethnicity (NH = Non-Hispanic) | Pop 2000 | Pop 2010 | Pop 2020 | % 2000 | % 2010 | % 2020 |
|---|---|---|---|---|---|---|
| White alone (NH) | 17,790 | 18,887 | 18,036 | 60.09% | 57.41% | 54.64% |
| Black or African American alone (NH) | 10,766 | 11,990 | 12,068 | 36.37% | 36.44% | 36.56% |
| Native American or Alaska Native alone (NH) | 190 | 185 | 169 | 0.64% | 0.56% | 0.51% |
| Asian alone (NH) | 105 | 645 | 577 | 0.35% | 1.96% | 1.75% |
| Pacific Islander alone (NH) | 5 | 6 | 9 | 0.02% | 0.02% | 0.03% |
| Other race alone (NH) | 25 | 14 | 117 | 0.08% | 0.04% | 0.35% |
| Mixed race or Multiracial (NH) | 359 | 442 | 1,128 | 1.21% | 1.34% | 3.42% |
| Hispanic or Latino (any race) | 365 | 730 | 905 | 1.23% | 2.22% | 2.74% |
| Total | 29,605 | 32,899 | 33,009 | 100.00% | 100.00% | 100.00% |

=== 2020 Census ===
As of the 2020 census, the county had a population of 33,009. The median age was 34.8 years. 18.8% of residents were under the age of 18 and 16.5% of residents were 65 years of age or older. For every 100 females there were 87.3 males, and for every 100 females age 18 and over there were 84.1 males age 18 and over.

The racial makeup of the county was 55.4% White, 36.8% Black or African American, 0.6% American Indian and Alaska Native, 1.8% Asian, 0.1% Native Hawaiian and Pacific Islander, 1.3% from some other race, and 4.1% from two or more races. Hispanic or Latino residents of any race comprised 2.7% of the population.

43.8% of residents lived in urban areas, while 56.2% lived in rural areas.

There were 13,901 households in the county, of which 25.0% had children under the age of 18 living with them and 37.6% had a female householder with no spouse or partner present. About 36.0% of all households were made up of individuals and 12.6% had someone living alone who was 65 years of age or older.

There were 15,977 housing units, of which 13.0% were vacant. Among occupied housing units, 56.9% were owner-occupied and 43.1% were renter-occupied. The homeowner vacancy rate was 1.2% and the rental vacancy rate was 10.7%.

=== 2010 census ===
As of the census of 2010, there were 32,899 people, 13,210 households, and 7,759 families living in the county. The population density was 49 people per square mile (19 people/km^{2}). There were 15,267 housing units at an average density of 22.7 units per square mile (8.8 units/km^{2}). The racial makeup of the county was 58.2% White, 36.6% Black or African American, 0.6% Native American, 2.0% Asian, 0.1% Pacific Islander, 1.0% from other races, and 1.5% from two or more races. 2.2% of the population were Hispanic or Latino of any race.

There were 13,210 households, out of which 23.9% had children under the age of 18 living with them, 38.1% were married couples living together, 16.2% had a female householder with no husband present, and 41.3% were non-families. 30.3% of all households were made up of individuals, and 9.5% had someone living alone who was 65 years of age or older. The average household size was 2.34 and the average family size was 2.94.

In the county, the population was spread out, with 20.3% under the age of 18, 21.2% from 18 to 24, 22.7% from 25 to 44, 22.9% from 45 to 64, and 12.8% who were 65 years of age or older. The median age was 31.4 years. For every 100 females, there were 91.3 males. For every 100 females age 18 and over, there were 92.4 males.

The median income for a household in the county was $29,181, and the median income for a family was $41,570. Males had a median income of $38,605 versus $26,495 for females. The per capita income for the county was $19,013. About 20.5% of families and 28.6% of the population were below the poverty line, including 35.8% of those under age 18 and 16.9% of those age 65 or over.

=== 2000 census ===
As of the census of 2000, there were 29,605 people, 11,933 households, and 7,649 families living in the county. The population density was 44 people per square mile (17 people/km^{2}). There were 13,981 housing units at an average density of 21 units per square mile (8.1 units/km^{2}). The racial makeup of the county was 60.77% White, 36.60% Black or African American, 0.66% Native American, 0.35% Asian, 0.02% Pacific Islander, 0.26% from other races, and 1.35% from two or more races. 1.23% of the population were Hispanic or Latino of any race.

There were 11,933 households, out of which 29.70% had children under the age of 18 living with them, 43.60% were married couples living together, 16.80% had a female householder with no husband present, and 35.90% were non-families. 29.80% of all households were made up of individuals, and 11.00% had someone living alone who was 65 years of age or older. The average household size was 2.38 and the average family size was 2.98.

In the county, the population was spread out, with 24.40% under the age of 18, 15.80% from 18 to 24, 26.00% from 25 to 44, 21.20% from 45 to 64, and 12.60% who were 65 years of age or older. The median age was 32 years. For every 100 females, there were 89.50 males. For every 100 females age 18 and over, there were 84.90 males.

The median income for a household in the county was $25,551, and the median income for a family was $34,132. Males had a median income of $27,094 versus $18,758 for females. The per capita income for the county was $14,904. About 18.50% of families and 23.10% of the population were below the poverty line, including 29.90% of those under age 18 and 21.90% of those age 65 or over.

== Politics ==
Pike County is a strongly Republican county. The last Democrat to win the county was Jimmy Carter in 1976.

United States presidential election results for Pike County, Alabama
| Year | Republican | | Democratic | | Third party(ies) | |
| Year | No. | % | No. | % | No. | % |
|---|---|---|---|---|---|---|
| 1824 | 14 | 14.29% | 72 | 73.47% | 12 | 12.24% |
| 1836 | 313 | 50.73% | 304 | 49.27% | 0 | 0.00% |
| 1840 | 653 | 51.02% | 627 | 48.98% | 0 | 0.00% |
| 1844 | 862 | 52.88% | 768 | 47.12% | 0 | 0.00% |
| 1848 | 935 | 58.51% | 663 | 41.49% | 0 | 0.00% |
| 1852 | 379 | 32.87% | 703 | 60.97% | 71 | 6.16% |
| 1856 | 0 | 0.00% | 1,262 | 51.72% | 1,178 | 48.28% |
| 1860 | 0 | 0.00% | 84 | 2.90% | 2,808 | 97.10% |
| 1868 | 256 | 12.37% | 1,813 | 87.63% | 0 | 0.00% |
| 1872 | 553 | 23.10% | 1,841 | 76.90% | 0 | 0.00% |
| 1876 | 464 | 18.02% | 2,111 | 81.98% | 0 | 0.00% |
| 1880 | 741 | 24.13% | 2,327 | 75.77% | 3 | 0.10% |
| 1884 | 783 | 23.71% | 2,494 | 75.53% | 25 | 0.76% |
| 1888 | 890 | 25.33% | 2,623 | 74.67% | 0 | 0.00% |
| 1892 | 42 | 1.11% | 2,298 | 60.55% | 1,455 | 38.34% |
| 1896 | 862 | 26.33% | 2,077 | 63.44% | 335 | 10.23% |
| 1900 | 498 | 25.47% | 1,413 | 72.28% | 44 | 2.25% |
| 1904 | 29 | 1.80% | 1,544 | 95.66% | 41 | 2.54% |
| 1908 | 39 | 2.49% | 1,507 | 96.29% | 19 | 1.21% |
| 1912 | 13 | 0.96% | 1,293 | 95.14% | 53 | 3.90% |
| 1916 | 50 | 2.69% | 1,789 | 96.39% | 17 | 0.92% |
| 1920 | 204 | 11.32% | 1,586 | 88.01% | 12 | 0.67% |
| 1924 | 30 | 1.59% | 1,832 | 97.34% | 20 | 1.06% |
| 1928 | 552 | 23.24% | 1,819 | 76.59% | 4 | 0.17% |
| 1932 | 52 | 2.00% | 2,545 | 97.92% | 2 | 0.08% |
| 1936 | 55 | 1.74% | 3,100 | 98.19% | 2 | 0.06% |
| 1940 | 121 | 3.81% | 3,049 | 95.94% | 8 | 0.25% |
| 1944 | 90 | 3.63% | 2,328 | 93.91% | 61 | 2.46% |
| 1948 | 87 | 4.74% | 0 | 0.00% | 1,747 | 95.26% |
| 1952 | 965 | 27.46% | 2,546 | 72.45% | 3 | 0.09% |
| 1956 | 997 | 25.97% | 2,631 | 68.53% | 211 | 5.50% |
| 1960 | 1,006 | 22.62% | 3,421 | 76.91% | 21 | 0.47% |
| 1964 | 4,373 | 84.49% | 0 | 0.00% | 803 | 15.51% |
| 1968 | 658 | 7.89% | 1,565 | 18.76% | 6,118 | 73.35% |
| 1972 | 5,690 | 76.66% | 1,624 | 21.88% | 108 | 1.46% |
| 1976 | 4,363 | 44.12% | 5,387 | 54.47% | 139 | 1.41% |
| 1980 | 5,220 | 52.25% | 4,417 | 44.21% | 354 | 3.54% |
| 1984 | 6,231 | 62.60% | 3,541 | 35.58% | 181 | 1.82% |
| 1988 | 5,897 | 60.04% | 3,813 | 38.82% | 111 | 1.13% |
| 1992 | 5,423 | 48.45% | 4,688 | 41.88% | 1,082 | 9.67% |
| 1996 | 5,281 | 51.07% | 4,514 | 43.65% | 546 | 5.28% |
| 2000 | 6,058 | 57.45% | 4,357 | 41.32% | 129 | 1.22% |
| 2004 | 7,483 | 62.97% | 4,334 | 36.47% | 66 | 0.56% |
| 2008 | 8,004 | 57.36% | 5,879 | 42.13% | 72 | 0.52% |
| 2012 | 7,963 | 56.38% | 6,035 | 42.73% | 125 | 0.89% |
| 2016 | 7,693 | 58.42% | 5,056 | 38.40% | 419 | 3.18% |
| 2020 | 8,042 | 58.10% | 5,636 | 40.72% | 163 | 1.18% |
| 2024 | 8,224 | 62.14% | 4,899 | 37.02% | 111 | 0.84% |

United States Senate election results for Pike County, Alabama2
| Year | Republican | | Democratic | | Third party(ies) | |
| Year | No. | % | No. | % | No. | % |
|---|---|---|---|---|---|---|
| 2020 | 7,777 | 56.31% | 6,020 | 43.59% | 14 | 0.10% |

United States Senate election results for Pike County, Alabama3
| Year | Republican | | Democratic | | Third party(ies) | |
| Year | No. | % | No. | % | No. | % |
|---|---|---|---|---|---|---|
| 2022 | 5,359 | 65.88% | 2,661 | 32.71% | 115 | 1.41% |

Alabama Gubernatorial election results for Pike County
| Year | Republican | | Democratic | | Third party(ies) | |
| Year | No. | % | No. | % | No. | % |
|---|---|---|---|---|---|---|
| 2022 | 5,375 | 65.98% | 2,568 | 31.52% | 203 | 2.49% |

== Communities ==
=== Cities ===
- Brundidge
- Troy (county seat)

=== Towns ===
- Banks
- Goshen

=== Unincorporated communities ===
- China Grove
- Henderson
- Josie
- Needmore
- Orion
- Saco
- Shady Grove
- Shiloh
- Tennille

== Notable people ==
- Littleton Prince (?-1833), white man executed for helping a runaway slave
- DeMarcus Ware, (1982–present), NFL Hall of Famer, played college football at Troy
- John Lewis (1940–2020), African-American civil rights leader and U.S. Congressman (1987–2020)

== See also ==
- Pike County Schools
- National Register of Historic Places listings in Pike County, Alabama
- Properties on the Alabama Register of Landmarks and Heritage in Pike County, Alabama
