= First African Baptist Church (Columbus, Georgia) =

Historic church in Georgia, United States

- U.S. National Register of Historic Places
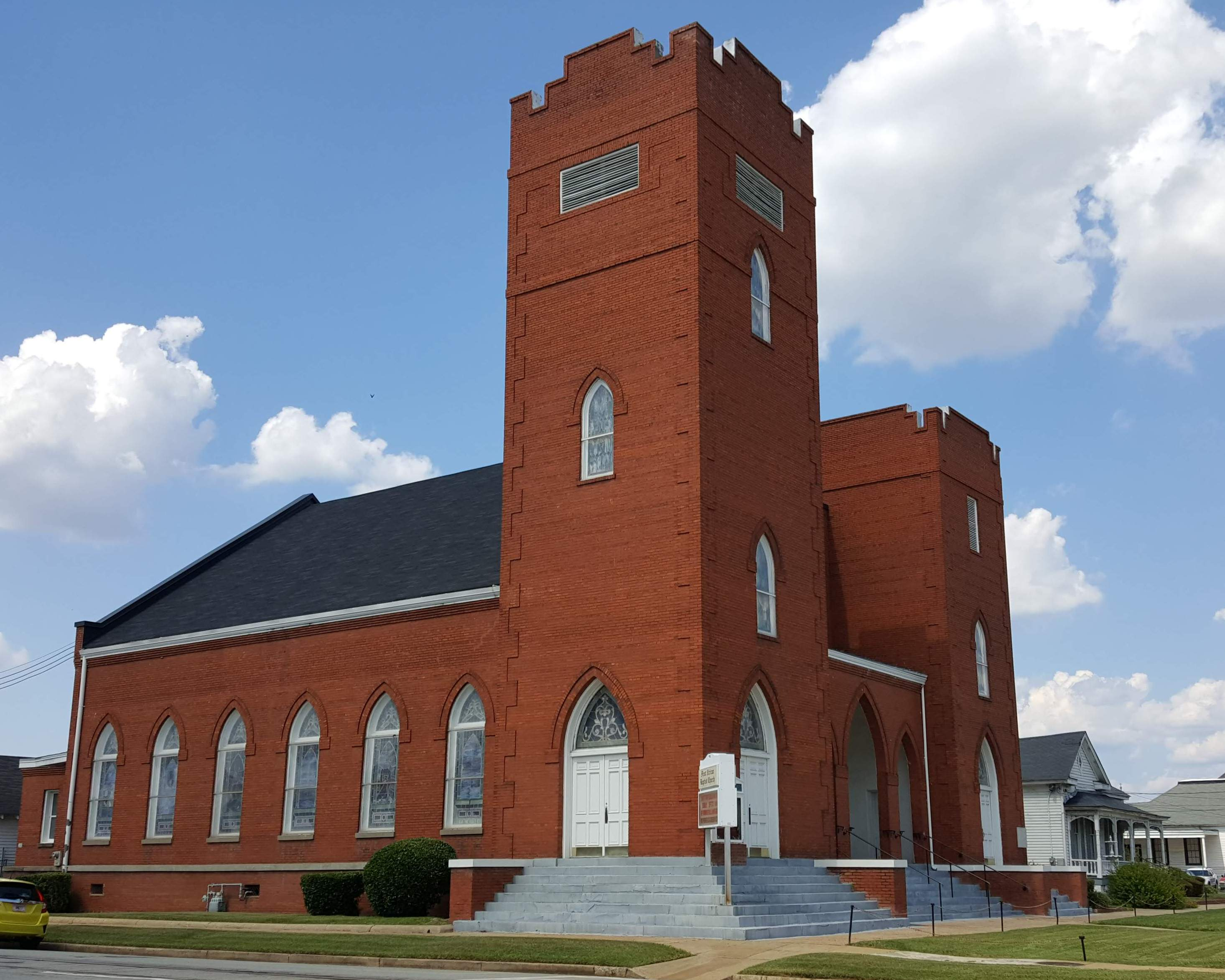
- First African Baptist Church

- Location within Georgia Location within the United States
- Location: 901 5th Ave., Columbus, Georgia
- Coordinates: 32°27′46″N 84°59′12″W
- Area: less than one acre
- Built: 1915
- Architectural style: Gothic Revival
- MPS: Columbus MRA
- NRHP reference No.: 80001165
- Added to NRHP: September 29, 1980

First African Baptist Church is a Baptist church located in Columbus, Georgia. It is affiliated with the National Baptist Convention, USA.

It was built in 1915 and added to the National Register in 1980. The First Baptist Church of Columbus was key in the construction.

It is featured on the Black Heritage Trail.
