= King v. Chapman =

- Court: United States District Court for the Middle District of Georgia
- Full case name: Primus E. King v. J. E. Chapman, Jr.
- Decided: 1945

Case history
- Prior action: Smith v. Allwright
- Appealed to: U.S. Court of Appeals, U.S. Supreme Court (denied cert)
- Related actions: (Consider cases dealing with voting rights and white primaries)

King v. Chapman is a 1945 court case between Primus King, a religious leader and barber in Columbus, Georgia, and J. E. Chapman, Jr., the chair of the Muscogee County Democratic Party. It ruled the white primary as used by the Democratic Party of Georgia to be unconstitutional. This case followed the Smith v. Allwright case, which struck down the white primaries in Texas and began the downfall of white primaries in other Deep South states.

== Background and ruling ==
On July 4, 1944, Primus E. King, an African-American registered voter, went to the Muscogee County Courthouse in Columbus to cast his vote in the Democratic Party’s primary election. He was turned away by law enforcement. Dr. Thomas Brewer, a local physician who co-founded the local branch of the NAACP, encouraged and financially supported Mr. King in his lawsuit filed in federal court. Lawyers for the Muscogee County Democratic Executive Committee, then chaired by J. E. Chapman, Jr., countered that the recent ruling in Smith v. Allwright, as well as the previous ruling in United States v. Classic, did not apply to Georgia due to the lack of a statutory requirement for primaries in Georgia law compared to the existence of the requirement in Texas and Louisiana law.

In a landmark ruling in 1945, the United States District Court for the Middle District of Georgia found in Mr. King's favor, deciding that the exclusion of black voters was unconstitutional under the Fourteenth, Fifteenth and Seventeenth Amendments. The court further ruled that the lack of a requirement for a primary under Georgia law did not negate the role of political parties acting as agents of the state in conducting publicly-regulated elections. The U.S. Court of Appeals affirmed the ruling on appeal, and the U.S. Supreme Court refused to hear the appeal by Chapman, which ended the white primary in Georgia.

== Impact ==
The end of the white primary in Georgia allowed African Americans to pursue the right to vote in Georgia for the first time, although the enforcement of poll taxes, literacy tests and the County Unit System would remain a significant barrier to most African-American voters in Georgia until the 1960s. The case was later cited in Gray v. Sanders (1963) to explain the role of political parties as agents of the state, as well as to overturn the county unit system. The ruling forced the state to further liberalize the state's elections under "one person, one vote", allowing for the election of Leroy Johnson, the first African American to serve in the Georgia General Assembly.

King v. Chapman also served as an inspiration to Martin Luther King Jr., then a 15-year-old who was admitted to Morehouse College.
