= Pike County Schools (Alabama) =

School district in Alabama

Pike County School District

Address
- 101 W. Love St Troy, Alabama, 36081; United States

District information
- Grades: K - 12
- Superintendent: Mark Bazzell

Other information
- Telephone: (334) 566-1850
- Fax: (334) 566-2580
- Website: www.pikecountyschools.com

Pike County Schools is a public school district in Pike County, Alabama, United States, based in Troy, Alabama.

== Schools ==
The Pike County School District has three elementary schools, one middle school, two high schools and one vocational facility.

Education Stage	Facilities
Elementary	Banks Primary School; Goshen Elementary School; Pike County Elementary School
Middle	Banks Middle School
High	Goshen High School; Pike County High School
Vocational	Troy-Pike Center for Technology
