= Nathan Brewington =

American politician

Nathan A. Brewington was an American state legislator in Alabama during the Reconstruction era. He represented Lowndes County from 1868 until 1870. He was prosperous.

He was born in Alabama in 1841. He was a minister and farmer.
