= 1908 United States presidential election in Alabama =

- November 3, 1908
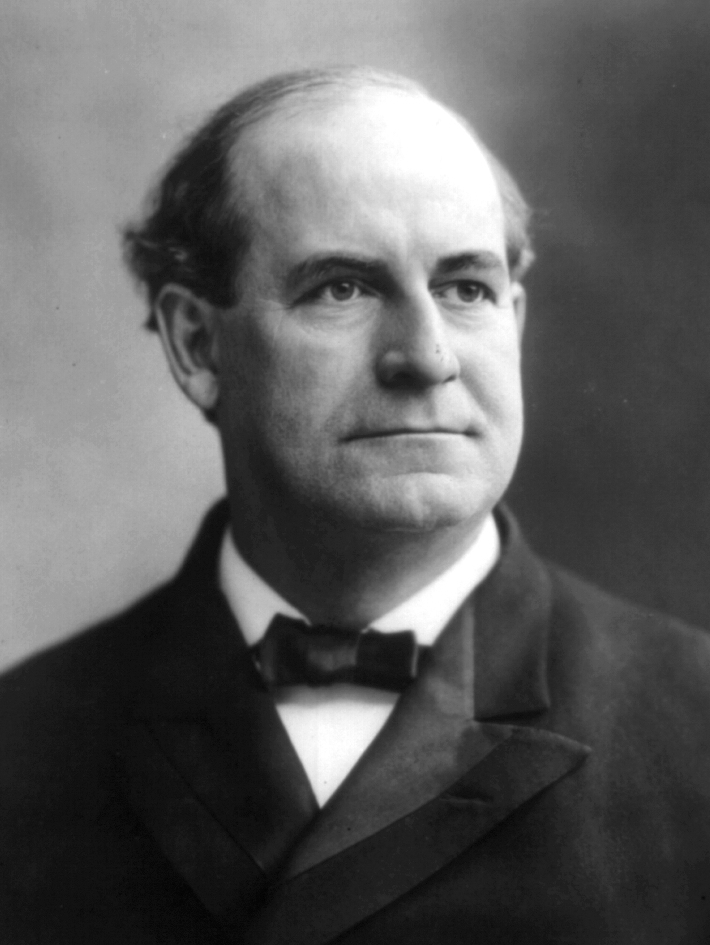

Nominee	William Jennings Bryan	William Howard Taft
Party	Democratic	Republican
Home state	Nebraska	Ohio
Running mate	John W. Kern	James S. Sherman
Electoral vote	11	0
Popular vote	74,374	25,372
Percentage	70.88%	24.18%
County results
Bryan
40–50%
50–60%
60–70%
70–80%
80–90%
90–100%
Taft
40–50%
50–60%
60–70%
President before election
Theodore Roosevelt
Republican
Elected President
William Howard Taft
Republican

The 1908 United States presidential election in Alabama took place on November 3, 1908. All contemporary 46 states were part of the 1908 United States presidential election. Alabama voters chose eleven electors to the Electoral College, which selected the president and vice president.

Alabama was won by the Democratic nominees, former Representative William Jennings Bryan of Nebraska and his running mate John W. Kern of Indiana. They defeated the Republican candidates, United States Secretary of War William Howard Taft of Ohio and his running mate James S. Sherman of New York. Bryan won the state by a margin of 46.7%.

With 70.88% of the popular vote, Alabama would prove to be Bryan's fifth strongest state in the 1908 presidential election after South Carolina, Mississippi, Louisiana and Texas.

Bryan had previously defeated William McKinley in Alabama in both 1896 and 1900.

== Results ==
1908 United States presidential election in Alabama
Party	Candidate	Votes	Percentage	Electoral votes
Democratic	William Jennings Bryan	74,374	70.88%	11
Republican	William Howard Taft	25,372	24.18%	0
Populist	Thomas E. Watson	1,575	1.50%	0
Social Democratic	Eugene V. Debs	1,450	1.38%	0
Republican	Davidson Faction	987	0.94%	0
Prohibition	Eugene W. Chafin	677	0.65%	0
Independence	Thomas L. Hisgen	497	0.47%	0
Totals		104,932	100.00%	11
Voter turnout				—

=== Results by county ===
County	William J. Bryan Democratic		William H. Taft Republican		Thomas E. Watson Populist		Eugene V. Debs Social Democratic		Various candidates Other parties		Margin		Total votes cast
County	#	%	#	%	#	%	#	%	#	%	#	%	Total votes cast
Autauga	655	87.10%	97	12.90%	0	0.00%	0	0.00%	0	0.00%	558	74.20%	752
Baldwin	439	68.70%	109	17.06%	0	0.00%	63	9.86%	28	4.38%	330	51.64%	639
Barbour	1,303	92.81%	43	3.06%	34	2.42%	6	0.43%	18	1.28%	1,260	89.74%	1,404
Bibb	670	72.98%	139	15.14%	16	1.74%	77	8.39%	16	1.74%	531	57.84%	918
Blount	1,133	52.80%	973	45.34%	23	1.07%	0	0.00%	17	0.79%	160	7.46%	2,146
Bullock	782	98.74%	10	1.26%	0	0.00%	0	0.00%	0	0.00%	772	97.47%	792
Butler	727	80.42%	137	15.15%	19	2.10%	9	1.00%	12	1.33%	590	65.27%	904
Calhoun	1,438	67.80%	570	26.87%	27	1.27%	9	0.42%	77	3.63%	868	40.92%	2,121
Chambers	1,025	92.84%	50	4.53%	15	1.36%	9	0.82%	5	0.45%	975	88.32%	1,104
Cherokee	712	50.42%	602	42.63%	24	1.70%	48	3.40%	26	1.84%	110	7.79%	1,412
Chilton	656	40.44%	890	54.87%	37	2.28%	26	1.60%	13	0.80%	−234	−14.43%	1,622
Choctaw	590	89.26%	44	6.66%	9	1.36%	9	1.36%	9	1.36%	546	82.60%	661
Clarke	1,169	94.20%	56	4.51%	5	0.40%	4	0.32%	7	0.56%	1,113	89.69%	1,241
Clay	863	57.76%	594	39.76%	26	1.74%	2	0.13%	9	0.60%	269	18.01%	1,494
Cleburne	278	38.83%	357	49.86%	2	0.28%	0	0.00%	79	11.03%	−79	−11.03%	716
Coffee	1,305	69.19%	341	18.08%	195	10.34%	13	0.69%	32	1.70%	964	51.11%	1,886
Colbert	849	67.06%	353	27.88%	0	0.00%	46	3.63%	18	1.42%	496	39.18%	1,266
Conecuh	651	81.78%	111	13.94%	11	1.38%	10	1.26%	13	1.63%	540	67.84%	796
Coosa	717	57.64%	447	35.93%	7	0.56%	0	0.00%	73	5.87%	270	21.70%	1,244
Covington	1,054	70.88%	315	21.18%	74	4.98%	17	1.14%	27	1.82%	739	49.70%	1,487
Crenshaw	1,100	74.07%	311	20.94%	38	2.56%	15	1.01%	21	1.41%	789	53.13%	1,485
Cullman	1,239	42.68%	1,521	52.39%	52	1.79%	11	0.38%	80	2.76%	−282	−9.71%	2,903
Dale	921	69.61%	346	26.15%	30	2.27%	4	0.30%	22	1.66%	575	43.46%	1,323
Dallas	1,420	97.06%	28	1.91%	4	0.27%	4	0.27%	7	0.48%	1,392	95.15%	1,463
DeKalb	1,395	54.58%	1,103	43.15%	18	0.70%	13	0.51%	27	1.06%	292	11.42%	2,556
Elmore	1,063	86.49%	138	11.23%	6	0.49%	4	0.33%	18	1.46%	925	75.26%	1,229
Escambia	641	80.93%	113	14.27%	0	0.00%	25	3.16%	13	1.64%	528	66.67%	792
Etowah	1,309	54.29%	996	41.31%	17	0.71%	44	1.82%	45	1.87%	313	12.98%	2,411
Fayette	731	47.22%	678	43.80%	45	2.91%	59	3.81%	35	2.26%	53	3.42%	1,548
Franklin	650	47.69%	652	47.84%	10	0.73%	42	3.08%	9	0.66%	−2	−0.15%	1,363
Geneva	854	56.15%	500	32.87%	126	8.28%	4	0.26%	37	2.43%	354	23.27%	1,521
Greene	423	96.36%	12	2.73%	4	0.91%	0	0.00%	0	0.00%	411	93.62%	439
Hale	714	97.81%	13	1.78%	0	0.00%	1	0.14%	2	0.27%	701	96.03%	730
Henry	723	81.24%	79	8.88%	72	8.09%	8	0.90%	8	0.90%	644	72.36%	890
Houston	965	66.23%	423	29.03%	28	1.92%	10	0.69%	31	2.13%	542	37.20%	1,457
Jackson	1,404	71.52%	469	23.89%	26	1.32%	3	0.15%	61	3.11%	935	47.63%	1,963
Jefferson	7,803	72.88%	2,182	20.38%	28	0.26%	367	3.43%	327	3.05%	5,621	52.50%	10,707
Lamar	839	83.07%	160	15.84%	2	0.20%	0	0.00%	9	0.89%	679	67.23%	1,010
Lauderdale	1,177	71.90%	427	26.08%	4	0.24%	14	0.86%	15	0.92%	750	45.82%	1,637
Lawrence	602	60.93%	344	34.82%	17	1.72%	14	1.42%	11	1.11%	258	26.11%	988
Lee	1,126	88.38%	64	5.02%	7	0.55%	51	4.00%	26	2.04%	1,062	83.36%	1,274
Limestone	1,188	81.76%	238	16.38%	2	0.14%	6	0.41%	19	1.31%	950	65.38%	1,453
Lowndes	633	94.20%	36	5.36%	0	0.00%	0	0.00%	3	0.45%	597	88.84%	672
Macon	482	91.12%	38	7.18%	5	0.95%	4	0.76%	0	0.00%	444	83.93%	529
Madison	2,168	87.10%	277	11.13%	1	0.04%	17	0.68%	26	1.04%	1,891	75.97%	2,489
Marengo	1,333	93.15%	78	5.45%	20	1.40%	0	0.00%	0	0.00%	1,255	87.70%	1,431
Marion	1,100	64.71%	589	34.65%	1	0.06%	2	0.12%	8	0.47%	511	30.06%	1,700
Marshall	1,313	56.09%	923	39.43%	52	2.22%	9	0.38%	44	1.88%	390	16.66%	2,341
Mobile	2,422	75.03%	453	14.03%	8	0.25%	53	1.64%	292	9.05%	1,969	61.00%	3,228
Monroe	856	96.61%	18	2.03%	5	0.56%	1	0.11%	6	0.68%	838	94.58%	886
Montgomery	2,621	96.54%	79	2.91%	1	0.04%	9	0.33%	5	0.18%	2,542	93.63%	2,715
Morgan	1,548	70.01%	497	22.48%	21	0.95%	92	4.16%	53	2.40%	1,051	47.54%	2,211
Perry	776	97.98%	12	1.52%	4	0.51%	0	0.00%	0	0.00%	764	96.46%	792
Pickens	816	85.36%	69	7.22%	23	2.41%	19	1.99%	29	3.03%	747	78.14%	956
Pike	1,507	96.29%	39	2.49%	15	0.96%	0	0.00%	4	0.26%	1,468	93.80%	1,565
Randolph	799	66.20%	395	32.73%	0	0.00%	5	0.41%	8	0.66%	404	33.47%	1,207
Russell	516	91.01%	32	5.64%	2	0.35%	15	2.65%	2	0.35%	484	85.36%	567
Shelby	1,011	40.57%	1,231	49.40%	212	8.51%	23	0.92%	15	0.60%	−220	−8.83%	2,492
St. Clair	820	45.71%	782	43.59%	108	6.02%	6	0.33%	78	4.35%	38	2.12%	1,794
Sumter	719	98.76%	3	0.41%	3	0.41%	1	0.14%	2	0.27%	716	98.35%	728
Talladega	1,010	72.61%	351	25.23%	10	0.72%	2	0.14%	18	1.29%	659	47.38%	1,391
Tallapoosa	1,343	81.59%	104	6.32%	6	0.36%	8	0.49%	185	11.24%	1,239	75.27%	1,646
Tuscaloosa	1,729	85.05%	162	7.97%	7	0.34%	76	3.74%	59	2.90%	1,567	77.08%	2,033
Walker	1,632	53.32%	1,367	44.66%	0	0.00%	43	1.40%	19	0.62%	265	8.66%	3,061
Washington	464	87.22%	40	7.52%	2	0.38%	10	1.88%	16	3.01%	424	79.70%	532
Wilcox	1,027	99.81%	2	0.19%	0	0.00%	0	0.00%	0	0.00%	1,025	99.61%	1,029
Winston	443	31.55%	949	67.59%	10	0.71%	2	0.14%	0	0.00%	−506	−36.04%	1,404
Totals	74,391	70.75%	25,561	24.31%	1,576	1.50%	1,444	1.37%	2,174	2.07%	48,830	46.44%	105,146

== See also ==
- United States presidential elections in Alabama
