= 1908 Alabama Railroad Commission election =

- November 3, 1908
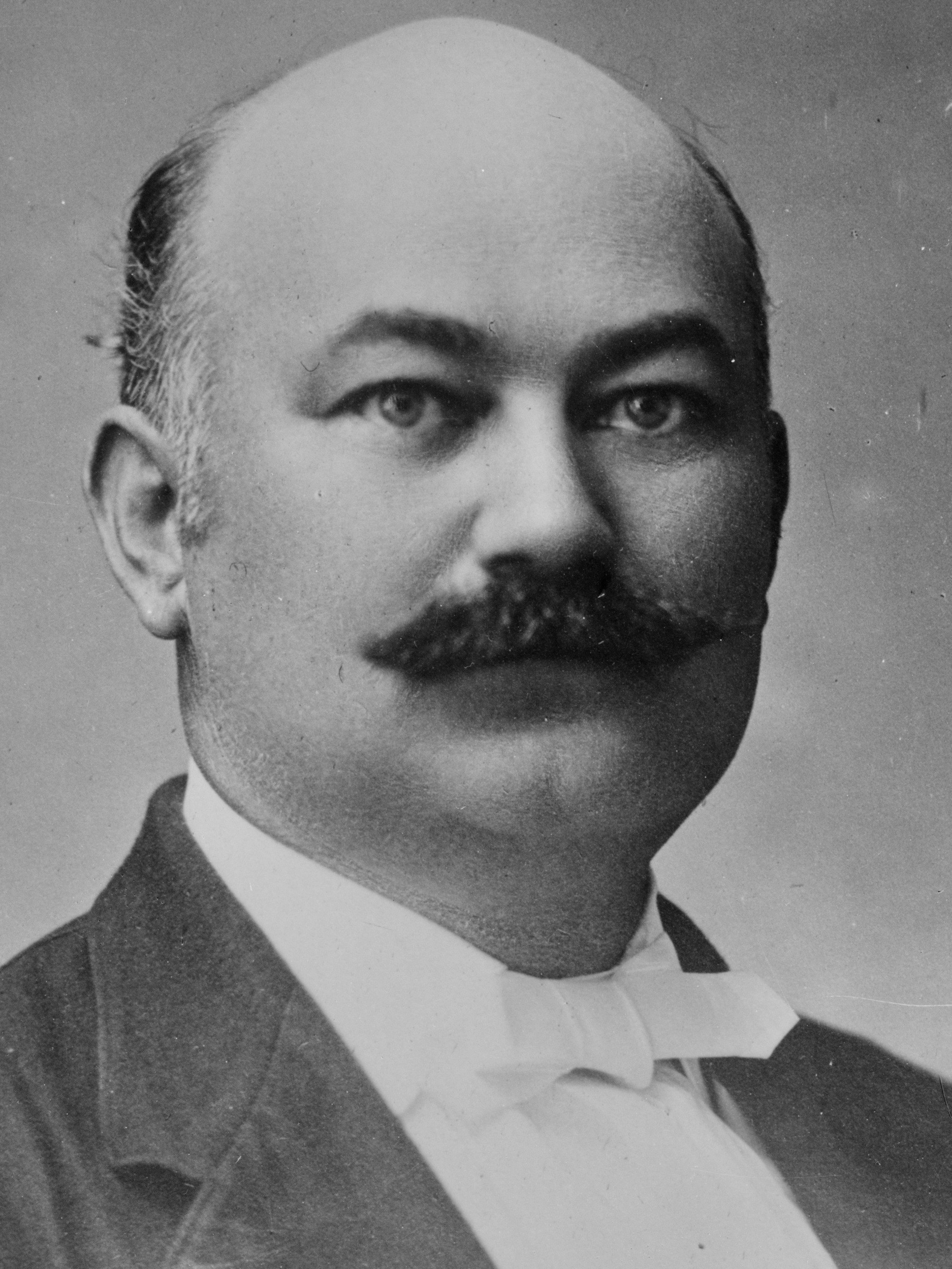

Candidate	Chas. Henderson	J. A. Hurst
Party	Democratic	Republican
Popular vote	75,275	22,910
Percentage	76.3%	23.2%
President before election
Chas. Henderson
Democratic
Elected President
Chas. Henderson
Democratic

The 1908 Alabama Railroad Commission election was held on November 3, 1908 to elect the president of the Alabama Railroad Commission (ARC). The primary election was held on May 18, 1908.

== Democratic primary ==
=== Candidates ===
==== Nominee ====
- Chas. Henderson, incumbent ARC president

== Republican convention ==
=== May convention ===
Hurst was nominated by the "Thompson" faction of the party. This convention was held in an attempt to contest the prior April convention, and was later considered the official convention.

==== Nominee ====
- J. A. Hurst

=== April convention ===
J. M. Cranford was nominated by the "Davidson" faction of the party. He appeared on the ballot under the label "Davidson Faction."

==== Nominee ====
- J. M. Cranford

== General election ==
=== Results ===
1908 Alabama Railroad Commission presidential election
Party	Candidate	Votes	%
Democratic	Chas. Henderson	75,275	76.28
Republican	J. A. Hurst	22,910	23.22
Davidson Faction	J. M. Crawford	501	0.51
Total votes		98,686	100.00
