= White v. Crook =

1966 court case in America

In White v. Crook (1966), the U.S. District Court for the Middle District of Alabama found that jury commissioners had violated the 14th Amendment, which prohibits sex and racial discrimination. White v. Crook was initially filed in 1965 following the murder of Jonathan Daniels, a young, white student at Harvard Divinity School. The American Civil liberties Union (ACLU) filed a civil lawsuit against Lowndes County Jury Commission of Alabama, utilizing Gardenia White, a black woman, as their lead plaintiff. Created by Charles Morgan, the lead civil rights lawyer on this case, charges argued that the systemic exclusion of potential jurors based on race and sex violated the 5th, 6th and 7th amendments, as well as the 14th Amendment's Due Process and Equal Protections Clause.

On August 20, 1965, Jonathan Daniels, Dick Morris, Ruby Sales and Joyce Bailey were released from jail in Hayneville, Alabama, following their unlawful arrests after participating in protests at white-only stores. Morris was a white Catholic priest, while Sales and Bailey were both black females activists. After their release, the four of them entered a near-by store where they encountered Tom Coleman, a middle-aged white volunteer deputy sheriff. Coleman aimed to shoot and kill Sales, however Daniels' timely sacrifice saved Sales, ultimately resulting in his own death. Although Strauder v. West Virginia (1888) prohibits the exclusion of black men from juries due to the Equal Protection Clause of the 14th Amendment, juries remained disproportionately stacked to increase the rate of exoneration amongst white offenders. Moreover, as of 1965, Alabama was one of only three remaining states legally banning women from participating in jury duty.

Once the initial lawsuit was filed, the Department of Justice became involved, calling for the release of the Lowndes Country Jury's records that may reveal the exclusions of potential black jury participants. While the claims most directly addressed the race-based discrimination, they implied that sex-based discrimination was equally as unjust and functioned similarly. Morgan and the ACLU faced three judges, Richard T Rives, Frank M Johnson, and Clarence Allgood, on their path through the legal system. Rives was known for helping make key decisions regarding Brown v. Board of Education (1954) and Johnson found the segregation within the transportation of Montgomery, Alabama to be unconstitutional, enforcing Brown v. Board of Education (1954), but Allgood was an intense segregationist.

Despite this, on February 7, 1966, the judges ruled that discrimination based on race and sex were in fact present and that the exclusion of women and African Americans from the Lowndes County jury violates the 14 Amendment's Equal Protection Clause, therefore it is unconstitutional. Since this victory mainly addressed the race-based discrimination claims, Murray and Kenyon maintained their status within the ACLU to further scrutinize and showcase the sex-based discrimination in hopes to achieve similar success, but they were ultimately less successful. It was not for another five years, in Reed v. Reed (1971), where courts ruled that the 14th amendment must prohibit gender-based discrimination as it violates the Equal Protection Clause.
