= 1900 United States presidential election in Alabama =

- November 6, 1900

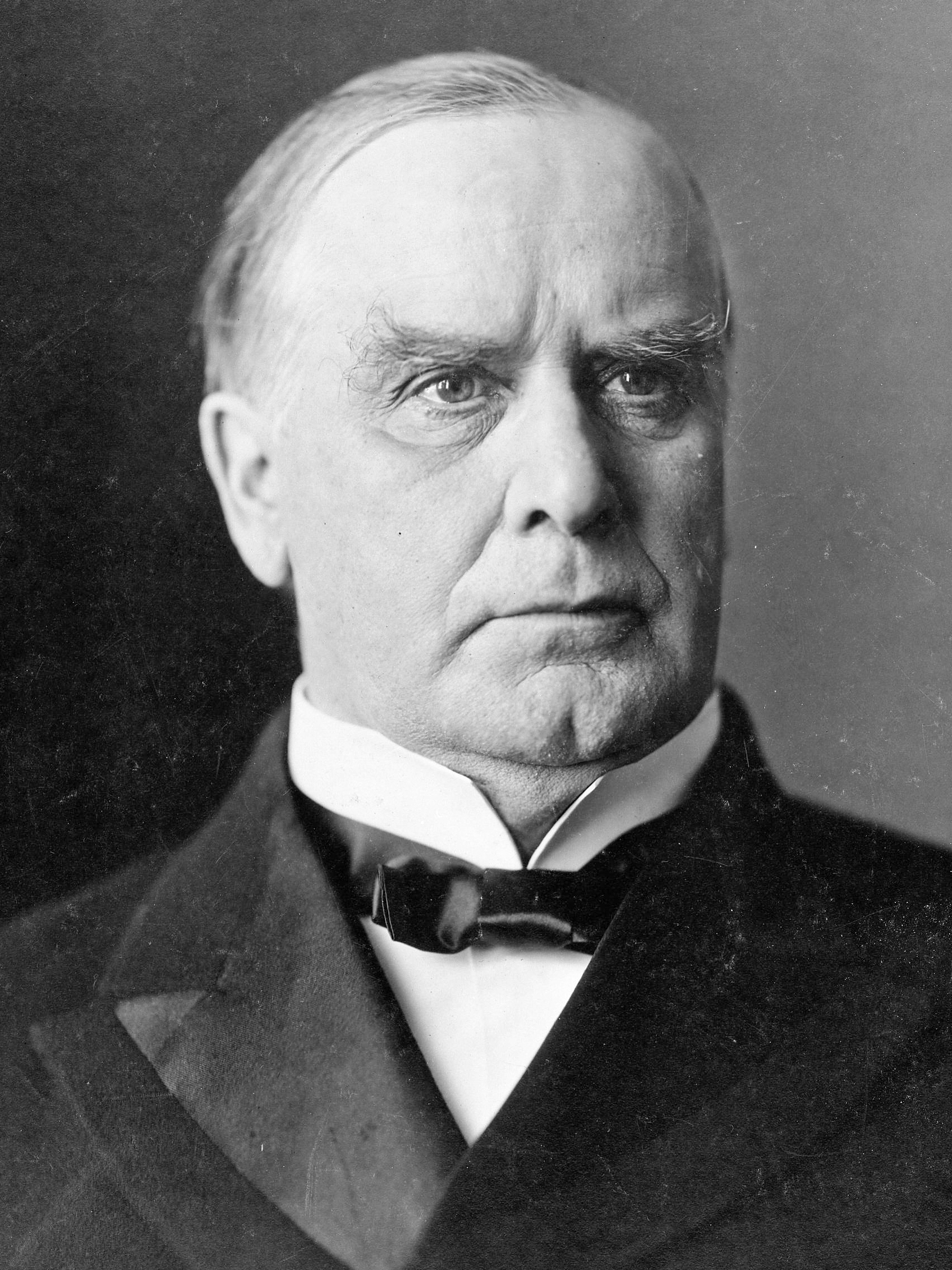
Nominee	William Jennings Bryan	William McKinley
Party	Democratic	Republican
Home state	Nebraska	Ohio
Running mate	Adlai Stevenson I	Theodore Roosevelt
Electoral vote	11	0
Popular vote	97,129	55,612
Percentage	60.82%	34.82%
County results
Bryan
40–50%
50–60%
60–70%
70–80%
80–90%
90–100%
McKinley
40–50%
50–60%
60–70%
President before election
William McKinley
Republican
Elected President
William McKinley
Republican

The 1900 United States presidential election in Alabama took place on November 6, 1900. All contemporary 45 states were part of the 1900 United States presidential election. Alabama voters chose eleven electors to the Electoral College, which selected the president and vice president.

Alabama was won by the Democratic nominees, former U.S. Representative William Jennings Bryan of Nebraska and his running mate Adlai Stevenson I of Illinois. They defeated the Republican nominees, incumbent President William McKinley of Ohio and his running mate Theodore Roosevelt of New York. Bryan won the state by a margin of 26%.

This would prove to be the last occasion when the Republican presidential candidate won Lauderdale and Limestone counties until Richard Nixon in 1972, the last when the Republican nominee carried Butler and Walker counties until Barry Goldwater in 1964, and the last when the Democratic nominee carried Winston County until Franklin D. Roosevelt won it by one vote in 1932. McKinley would be the last Republican nominee to win without carrying Winston County.

Bryan had previously defeated McKinley in Alabama four years earlier and would later win the state again in 1908 against William Howard Taft.

== Results ==
1900 United States presidential election in Alabama
Party	Candidate	Votes	Percentage	Electoral votes
Democratic	William J. Bryan	97,129	60.82%	11
Republican	William McKinley (incumbent)	55,612	34.82%	0
Populist	Wharton Barker	4,188	2.62%	0
Prohibition	John G. Woolley	2,763	1.73%	0
Totals		159,692	100.00%	11
Voter turnout				—

=== Results by county ===
1900 United States presidential election in Alabama by county
County	William Jennings Bryan Democratic		William McKinley Republican		Wharton Barker Populist		John Granville Woolley Prohibition		Margin		Total votes cast
County	#	%	#	%	#	%	#	%	#	%	Total votes cast
Autauga	980	62.70%	537	34.36%	38	2.43%	8	0.51%	443	28.34%	1,563
Baldwin	444	48.21%	396	43.00%	74	8.03%	7	0.76%	48	5.21%	921
Barbour	2,714	89.57%	272	8.98%	21	0.69%	23	0.76%	2,442	80.59%	3,030
Bibb	725	56.77%	482	37.74%	30	2.35%	40	3.13%	243	19.03%	1,277
Blount	1,484	52.92%	1,134	40.44%	113	4.03%	73	2.60%	350	12.48%	2,804
Bullock	1,586	84.99%	269	14.42%	7	0.38%	4	0.21%	1,317	70.58%	1,866
Butler	744	37.18%	1,161	58.02%	76	3.80%	20	1.00%	−417	−20.84%	2,001
Calhoun	1,835	68.37%	567	21.13%	198	7.38%	84	3.13%	1,268	47.24%	2,684
Chambers	2,837	74.21%	835	21.84%	62	1.62%	89	2.33%	2,002	52.37%	3,823
Cherokee	1,167	41.87%	1,169	41.94%	392	14.07%	59	2.12%	−2	−0.07%	2,787
Chilton	469	37.22%	791	62.78%	24	1.83%	28	2.13%	−322	−25.56%	1,260
Choctaw	658	59.07%	406	36.45%	33	2.96%	17	1.53%	252	22.62%	1,114
Clarke	2,066	84.12%	372	15.15%	4	0.16%	14	0.57%	1,694	68.97%	2,456
Clay	990	44.84%	1,087	49.23%	94	4.26%	37	1.68%	−97	−4.39%	2,208
Cleburne	660	47.69%	624	45.09%	50	3.61%	50	3.61%	36	2.60%	1,384
Coffee	998	63.08%	535	33.82%	19	1.20%	30	1.90%	463	29.27%	1,582
Colbert	1,542	53.08%	1,243	42.79%	85	2.93%	35	1.20%	299	10.29%	2,905
Conecuh	718	43.07%	803	48.17%	81	4.86%	65	3.90%	−85	−5.10%	1,667
Coosa	959	48.41%	951	48.01%	31	1.56%	40	2.02%	8	0.40%	1,981
Covington	560	66.59%	183	21.76%	59	7.02%	39	4.64%	377	44.83%	841
Crenshaw	1,141	57.68%	549	27.76%	168	8.49%	120	6.07%	592	29.93%	1,978
Cullman	1,167	54.46%	820	38.26%	122	5.69%	34	1.59%	347	16.19%	2,143
Dale	1,141	51.21%	888	39.86%	146	6.55%	53	2.38%	253	11.36%	2,228
Dallas	4,714	94.26%	161	3.22%	50	1.00%	76	1.52%	4,553	91.04%	5,001
DeKalb	1,873	50.53%	1,735	46.80%	67	1.81%	32	0.86%	138	3.72%	3,707
Elmore	1,773	58.34%	1,104	36.33%	31	1.02%	131	4.31%	669	22.01%	3,039
Escambia	609	56.18%	436	40.22%	15	1.38%	24	2.21%	173	15.96%	1,084
Etowah	1,734	48.65%	1,629	45.71%	164	4.60%	37	1.04%	105	2.95%	3,564
Fayette	698	43.35%	892	55.40%	11	0.68%	9	0.56%	−194	−12.05%	1,610
Franklin	814	38.58%	1,151	54.55%	89	4.22%	56	2.65%	−337	−15.97%	2,110
Geneva	679	46.48%	657	44.97%	99	6.78%	26	1.78%	22	1.51%	1,461
Greene	964	88.44%	107	9.82%	5	0.46%	14	1.28%	857	78.62%	1,090
Hale	1,563	80.48%	348	17.92%	12	0.62%	19	0.98%	1,215	62.56%	1,942
Henry	1,984	73.35%	590	21.81%	86	3.18%	45	1.66%	1,394	51.53%	2,705
Jackson	1,933	52.37%	1,694	45.90%	24	0.65%	40	1.08%	239	6.48%	3,691
Jefferson	4,580	59.32%	2,842	36.81%	86	1.11%	213	2.76%	1,738	22.51%	7,721
Lamar	890	61.29%	509	35.06%	30	2.07%	23	1.58%	381	26.24%	1,452
Lauderdale	1,380	48.13%	1,458	50.85%	17	0.59%	12	0.42%	−78	−2.72%	2,867
Lawrence	1,262	54.30%	996	42.86%	27	1.16%	39	1.68%	266	11.45%	2,324
Lee	1,718	60.34%	1,026	36.04%	28	0.98%	75	2.63%	692	24.31%	2,847
Limestone	1,063	46.56%	1,157	50.68%	26	1.14%	37	1.62%	−94	−4.12%	2,283
Lowndes	1,770	53.43%	1,524	46.00%	10	0.30%	9	0.27%	246	7.43%	3,313
Macon	1,295	69.96%	511	27.61%	19	1.03%	26	1.40%	784	42.36%	1,851
Madison	3,641	67.80%	1,679	31.27%	36	0.67%	14	0.26%	1,962	36.54%	5,370
Marengo	2,306	90.40%	234	9.17%	4	0.16%	7	0.27%	2,072	81.22%	2,551
Marion	1,137	61.63%	685	37.13%	8	0.43%	15	0.81%	452	24.50%	1,845
Marshall	1,398	49.49%	1,139	40.32%	219	7.75%	69	2.44%	259	9.17%	2,825
Mobile	2,939	54.56%	2,243	41.64%	112	2.08%	93	1.73%	696	12.92%	5,387
Monroe	909	85.11%	145	13.58%	6	0.56%	8	0.75%	764	71.54%	1,068
Montgomery	3,047	80.91%	567	15.06%	60	1.59%	92	2.44%	2,480	65.85%	3,766
Morgan	1,747	52.45%	1,500	45.03%	67	2.01%	17	0.51%	247	7.42%	3,331
Perry	1,748	94.18%	80	4.31%	15	0.81%	13	0.70%	1,668	89.87%	1,856
Pickens	797	70.72%	203	18.01%	59	5.24%	68	6.03%	594	52.71%	1,127
Pike	1,413	72.28%	498	25.47%	35	1.79%	9	0.46%	915	46.80%	1,955
Randolph	1,510	51.48%	1,377	46.95%	36	1.23%	10	0.34%	133	4.53%	2,933
Russell	1,416	90.13%	135	8.59%	12	0.76%	8	0.51%	1,281	81.54%	1,571
Shelby	749	32.92%	1,389	61.05%	96	4.22%	41	1.80%	−640	−28.13%	2,275
St. Clair	794	32.47%	1,171	47.89%	411	16.81%	69	2.82%	−377	−15.42%	2,445
Sumter	1,053	82.20%	204	15.93%	6	0.47%	18	1.41%	849	66.28%	1,281
Talladega	1,602	50.68%	1,393	44.07%	44	1.39%	122	3.86%	209	6.61%	3,161
Tallapoosa	2,557	66.00%	1,202	31.03%	31	0.80%	84	2.17%	1,355	34.98%	3,874
Tuscaloosa	1,173	62.03%	650	34.37%	39	2.06%	29	1.53%	523	27.66%	1,891
Walker	1,250	41.78%	1,699	56.78%	25	0.84%	18	0.60%	−449	−15.01%	2,992
Washington	492	61.50%	269	33.63%	27	3.38%	12	1.50%	223	27.88%	800
Wilcox	2,031	97.46%	30	1.44%	2	0.10%	21	1.01%	2,001	96.02%	2,084
Winston	539	49.59%	519	47.75%	15	1.38%	14	1.29%	20	1.84%	1,087
Totals	97,129	60.84%	55,612	34.84%	4,188	2.62%	2,763	1.73%	41,517	26.01%	159,640

== See also ==
- United States presidential elections in Alabama
