= Burkville, Alabama =

Unincorporated community in Alabama, US

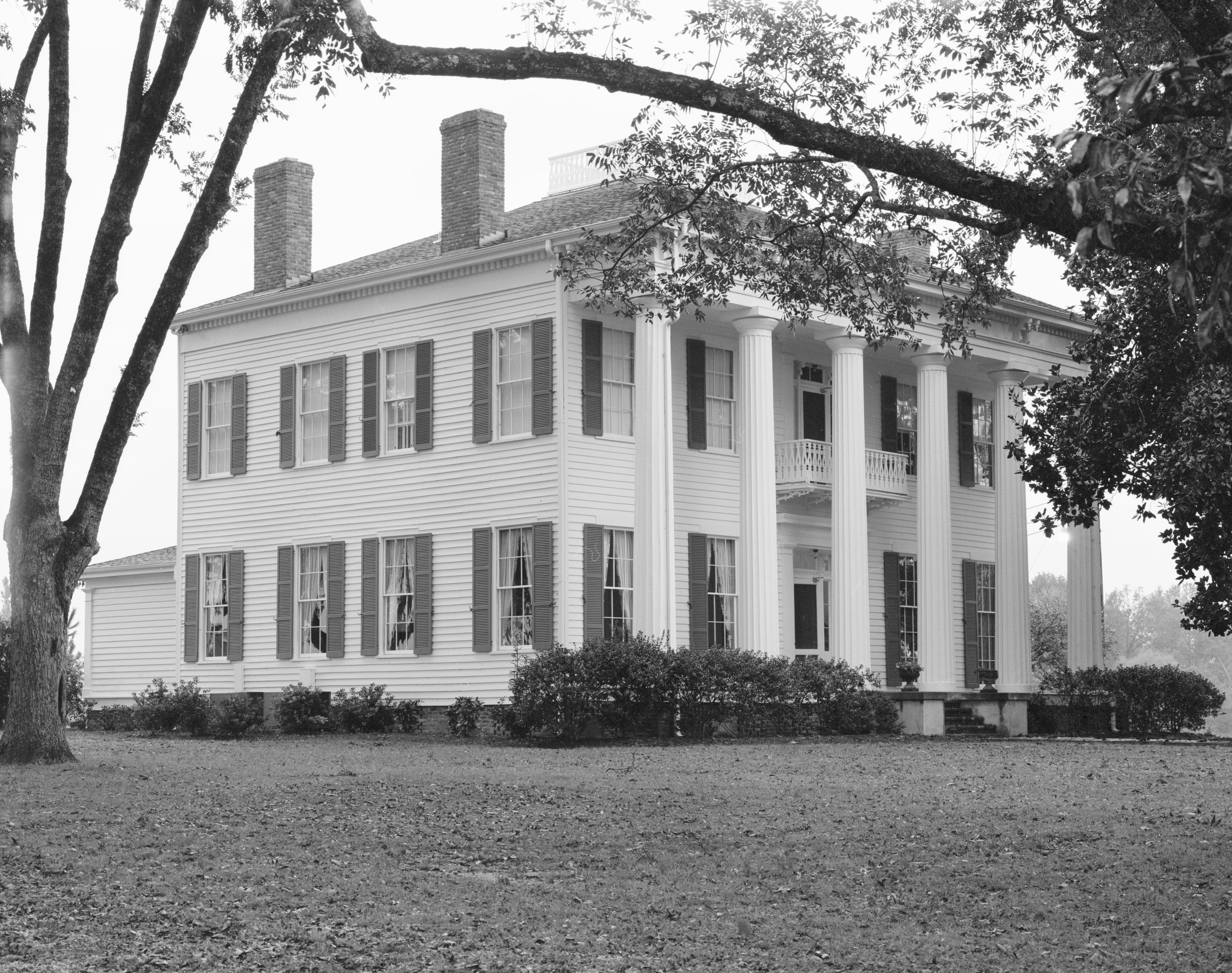
- Warren Stone House, known as Magnolia Crest, built c.1840 in Burkville

- Location within Alabama Location within the United States
- Coordinates: 32.32819°N 86.53691°W
- Country: United States
- State: Alabama
- County: Lowndes
- Elevation: 151 ft (46 m)
- Time zone: UTC-6 (Central (CST))
  - Summer (DST): UTC-5 (CDT)
- Area code: 334

Burkville, is an unincorporated community in Lowndes County, Alabama, United States.

== Geography ==
Burkville is located at 32.32819°N 86.53691°W and has an elevation of 151 feet (46 m).

== Gallery ==
Below are photographs taken in Burkville for the Historic American Buildings Survey:

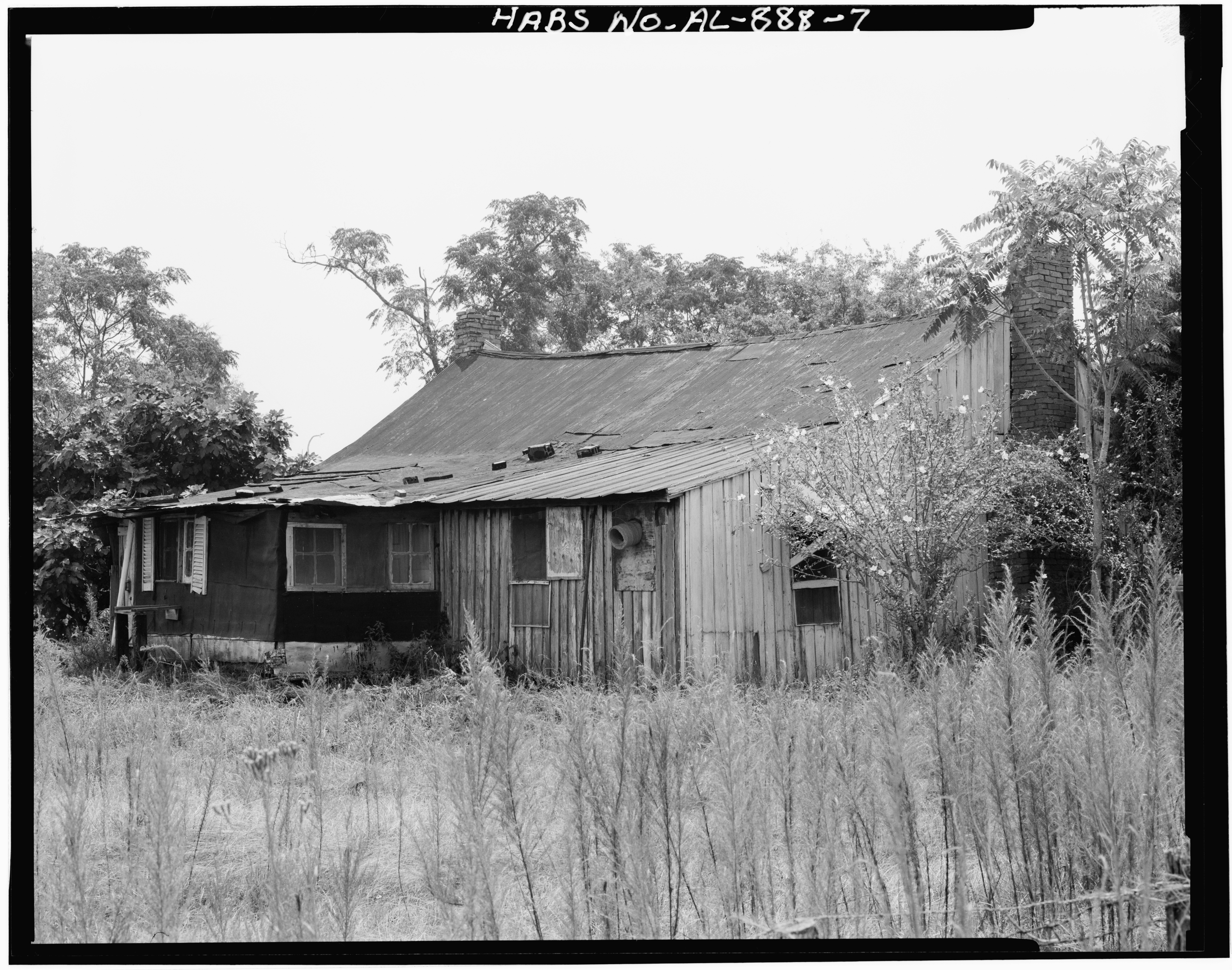
McCary Tenant House

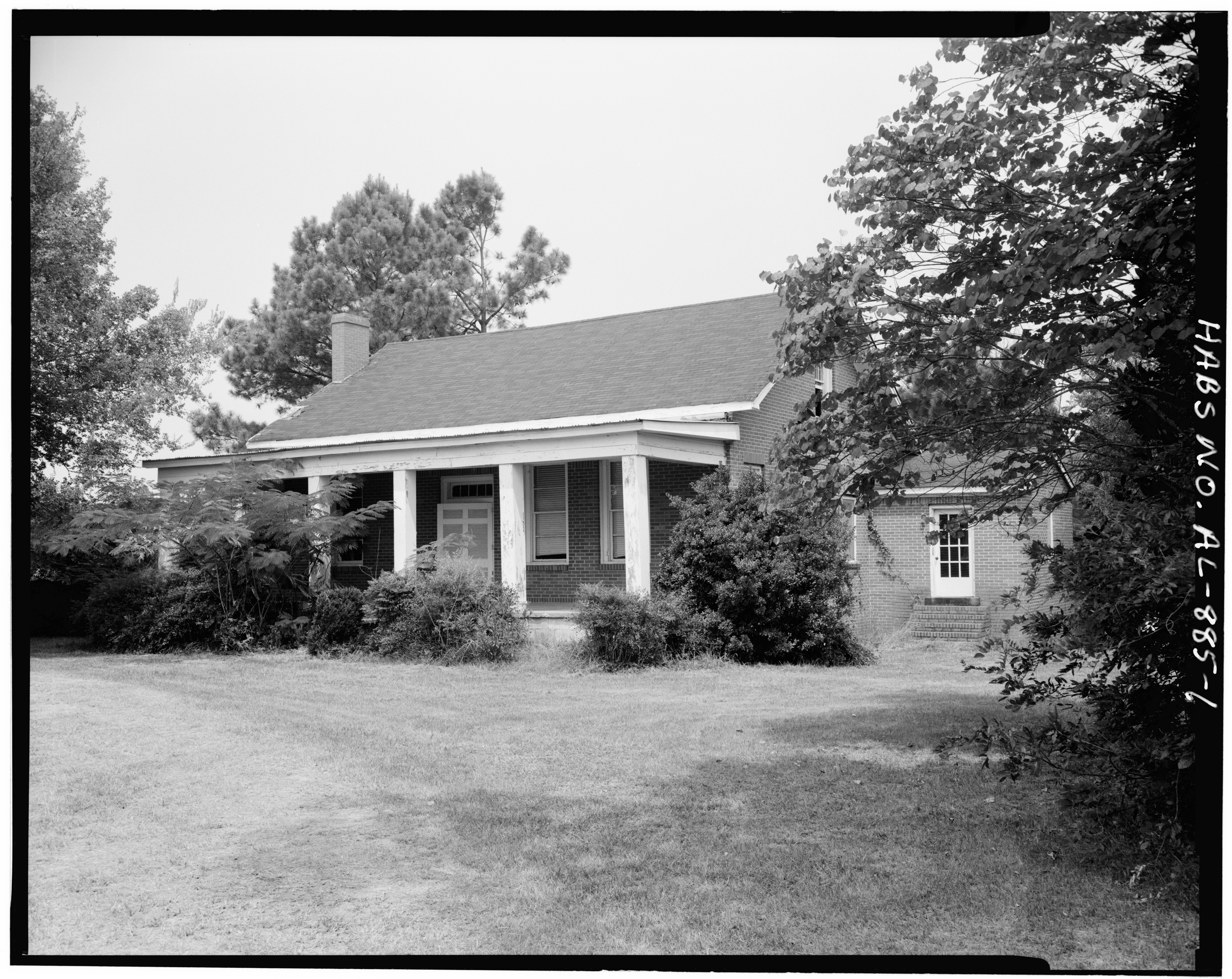
David Graves House

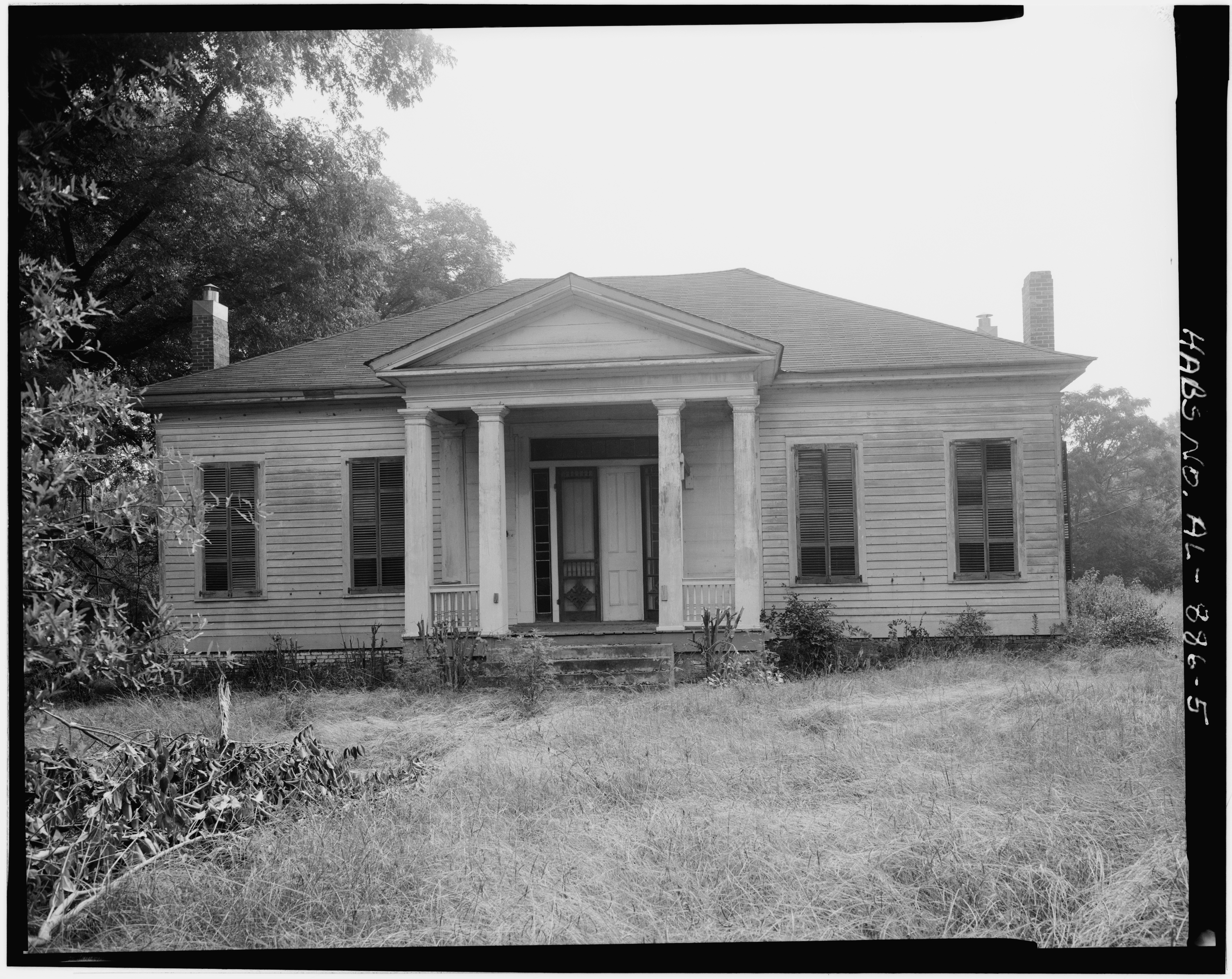
Young-Nall House

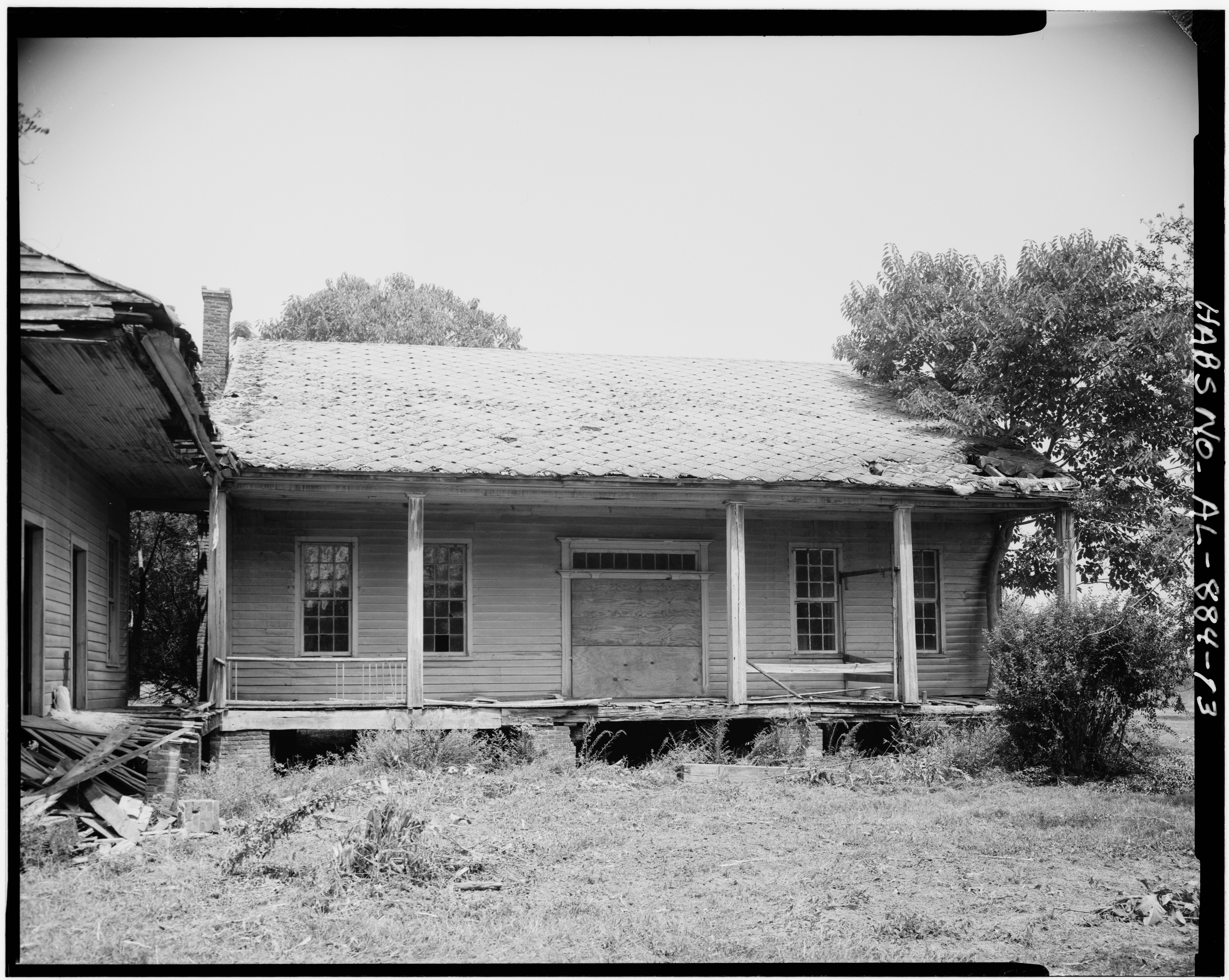
Josiah Haigler Plantation House

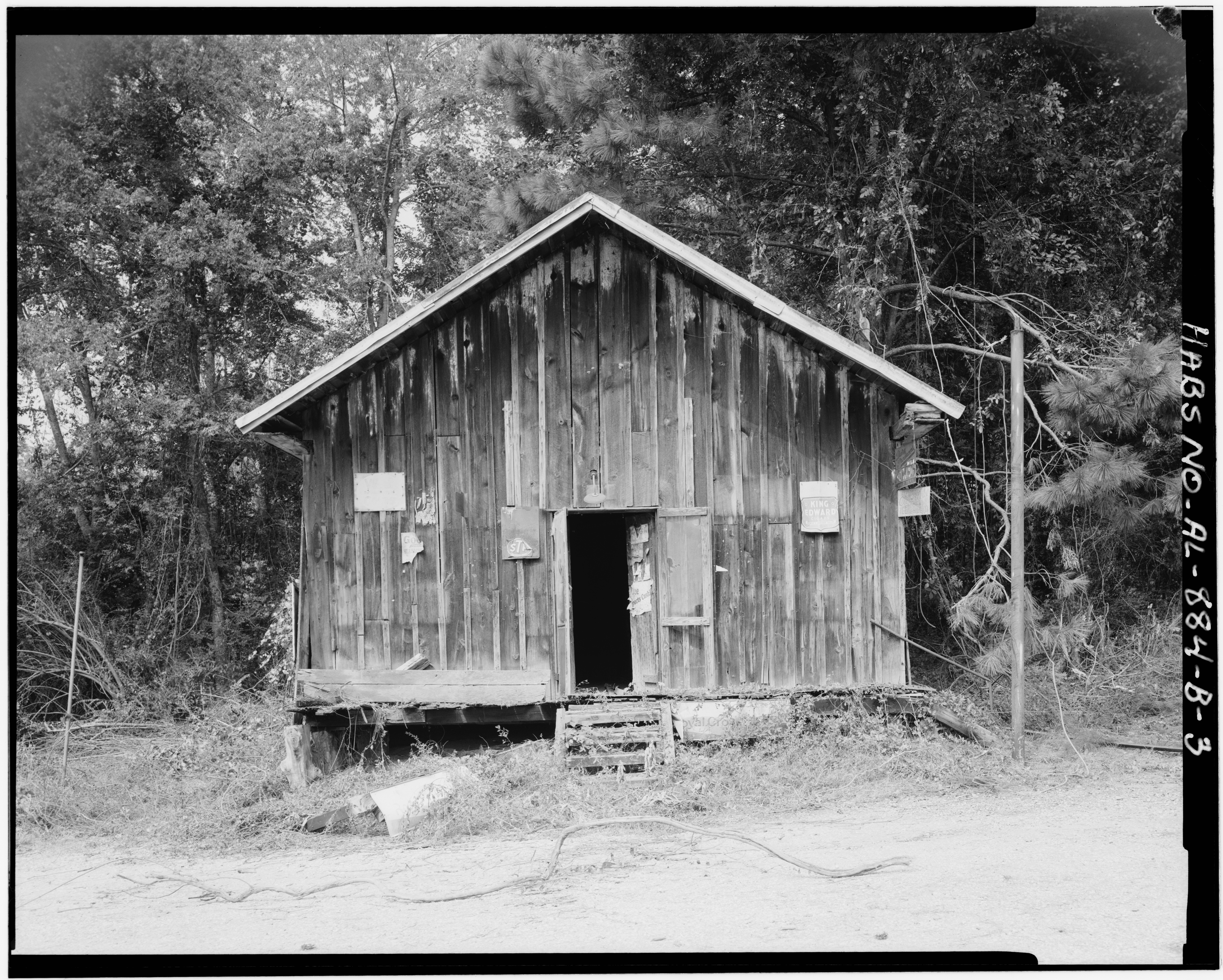
Josiah Haigler Plantation Commissary

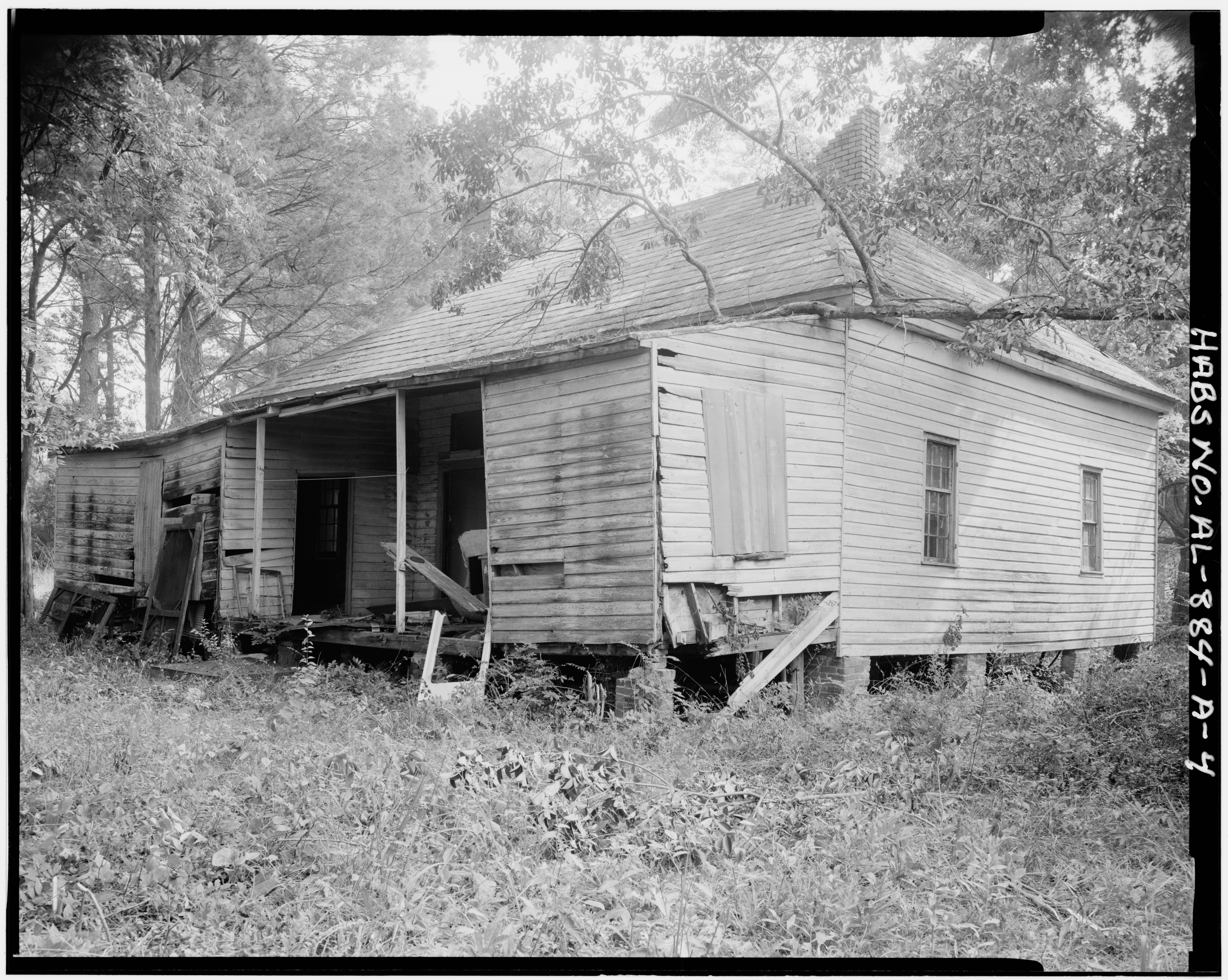
New Josiah Haigler Plantation House
