= Trickem, Lowndes County, Alabama =

Unincorporated community in Alabama, United States

Trickem, Alabama
- Unincorporated community
- Location within Alabama Location within the United States
- Coordinates: 32°16′25″N 86°44′49″W
- Country: United States
- State: Alabama
- County: Lowndes
- Elevation: 210 ft (64 m)
- Time zone: UTC-6 (Central (CST))
  - Summer (DST): UTC-5 (CDT)
- Area code: 334
- GNIS feature ID: 155278

Trickem is an unincorporated community in Lowndes County, Alabama, United States.
