= Lowndes County Courthouse (Alabama) =

- U.S. National Register of Historic Places
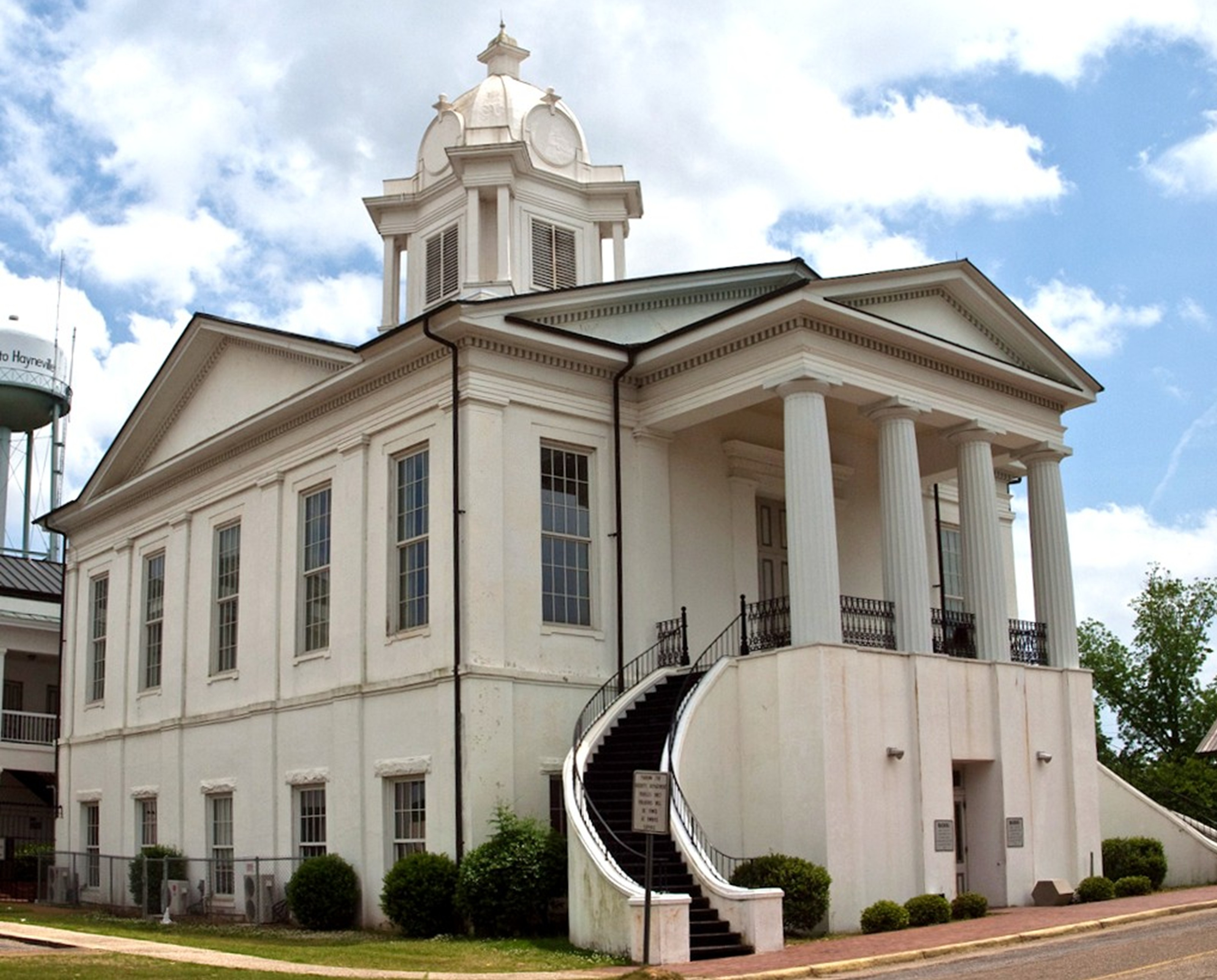
- The courthouse in 2011

- Location within Alabama Location within the United States
- Interactive map showing the location of Lowndes County Courthouse
- Location: Washington St., Hayneville, Alabama
- Coordinates: 32°11′01″N 86°34′47″W
- Area: less than one acre
- Built: 1856
- Architectural style: Greek Revival
- NRHP reference No.: 71000100
- Added to NRHP: June 24, 1971

The Lowndes County Courthouse is a historic courthouse building in Hayneville, Alabama. It has served as the Lowndes County courthouse since 1856. The Greek Revival-style building is one of only four antebellum courthouses that remain in use in Alabama. It was added to the National Register of Historic Places on June 24, 1971.

== History ==
The Lowndes County Courthouse was completed in 1856. It replaced an earlier courthouse, built in 1832, that had been deemed unsafe. The building was expanded during 1905 remodeling, with two-story wings added to each side, an enclosed front entrance replacing the portico, and a domed cupola added to the center of the roof. The side wings and enclosed entrance were removed during the 1980s and the portico replaced with a duplicate of the original, at an approximate cost of $1 million. A new two-story annex was constructed to the rear of the 1856 building.
