= Bates Turkey Farm =

Coordinates: 31°57′55.46″N 86°29′12.99″W

- Interactive map of Bates Turkey Farm
- State: Alabama
- Country: United States

Bates Turkey Farm is a domestic turkey producer founded in 1923 and based near Fort Deposit, Alabama (about thirty miles south of Montgomery, in Lowndes County). A wedding gift of nine turkey eggs was the start of the operation.

The farm is on approximately 900 acres (360 ha) of land and raises free-range turkeys (about 60,000 in 2008) under pecan trees on about 30 of those acres. The farm purchases poults (baby turkeys) from a hatchery in Oakwood, Ohio. The turkeys are fed a diet of "freshly ground corn, oats and soybean meal, along with some vitamins" and each "needs 70 pounds of grain to reach slaughter size". The Bates Farm services customers from a wide range of locations, including many that are far-flung, including California, Oregon, and Alaska. Because it is cheaper to raise turkeys in the Mid-West, nearer where the grain they eat is grown, other turkey farms in the state have gone out of business, leaving Bates as the sole remaining in Alabama, which once had 150 turkey growers. Turkey prices are highly dependent on feed costs—in 2011 Bates had to double his prices after corn got more expensive.

It is the supplier of Clyde, a series of turkeys that have been ritually pardoned by the governor of Alabama on Thanksgiving since 1949 (Clyde was first pardoned by "Big Jim" Folsom) as well as a frozen turkey, which is eaten as the governor's Thanksgiving meal.

In 1969, Willie Claude "Bill" Bates, Jr. opened his first Bates House of Turkey restaurant in Greenville; two more have followed, each serving an all-turkey menu and having turkey-themed decor.
