= 1896 United States presidential election in Alabama =

- November 3, 1896

Nominee	William Jennings Bryan	William McKinley
Party	Democratic	Republican
Alliance	Populist
Home state	Nebraska	Ohio
Running mate	Arthur Sewall	Garret Hobart
Electoral vote	11	0
Popular vote	130,298	55,673
Percentage	66.96%	28.61%
County results
Bryan
40–50%
50–60%
60–70%
70–80%
80–90%
90–100%
McKinley
40–50%
50–60%
60–70%
President before election
Grover Cleveland
Democratic
Elected President
William McKinley
Republican

The 1896 United States presidential election in Alabama took place on November 3, 1896. All contemporary 45 states were part of the 1896 United States presidential election. Alabama voters chose eleven electors to the Electoral College, which selected the president and vice president.

Alabama was won by the Democratic nominees, former U.S. Representative William Jennings Bryan of Nebraska and his running mate Arthur Sewall of Maine. They defeated the Republican nominees, former Governor of Ohio William McKinley and his running mate Garret Hobart of New Jersey. Bryan won the state by a margin of 38.35%.

Despite losing by more than a two-to-one margin, this would prove the last time a Republican won Colbert County until Richard Nixon in 1972.

Bryan would defeat McKinley in Alabama again four years later and would later win the state again in 1908 against William Howard Taft.

== Results ==
1896 United States presidential election in Alabama
Party	Candidate	Votes	Percentage	Electoral votes
Democratic	William Jennings Bryan	106,209	54.58%	11
Populist	William Jennings Bryan	24,089	12.38%	0
Total	William Jennings Bryan	130,298	66.96%	11
Republican	William McKinley	55,673	28.61%	0
National Democratic	John M. Palmer	6,375	3.28%	0
Prohibition	Joshua Levering	2,234	1.15%	0
Totals		194,580	100.00%	11
Voter turnout				—

=== Results by county ===
County	William Jennings Bryan Democratic		William McKinley Republican		John M. Palmer National Democratic		Joshua Levering Prohibition		Margin		Total votes cast
County	#	%	#	%	#	%	#	%	#	%	Total votes cast
Autauga	1,281	76.25%	289	17.20%	99	5.89%	11	0.65%	992	59.05%	1,680
Baldwin	726	61.47%	404	34.21%	34	2.88%	17	1.44%	322	27.27%	1,181
Barbour	2,657	59.87%	1,437	32.38%	315	7.10%	29	0.65%	1,220	27.49%	4,438
Bibb	1,516	67.83%	650	29.08%	39	1.74%	30	1.34%	866	38.75%	2,235
Blount	2,422	47.39%	2,619	51.24%	40	0.78%	30	0.59%	−197	−3.85%	5,111
Bullock	1,867	67.57%	749	27.11%	131	4.74%	16	0.58%	1,118	40.46%	2,763
Butler	1,809	65.31%	846	30.54%	88	3.18%	27	0.97%	963	34.77%	2,770
Calhoun	2,788	64.90%	1,222	28.45%	171	3.98%	115	2.68%	1,566	36.45%	4,296
Chambers	2,010	63.67%	1,057	33.48%	63	2.00%	27	0.86%	953	30.19%	3,157
Cherokee	1,776	71.47%	602	24.23%	89	3.58%	18	0.72%	1,174	47.24%	2,485
Chilton	1,131	74.65%	310	20.46%	52	3.43%	22	1.45%	821	54.19%	1,515
Choctaw	1,485	78.03%	357	18.76%	50	2.63%	11	0.58%	1,128	59.27%	1,903
Clarke	2,243	80.34%	502	17.98%	25	0.90%	22	0.79%	1,741	62.36%	2,792
Clay	1,410	71.90%	489	24.94%	37	1.89%	25	1.27%	921	46.97%	1,961
Cleburne	993	65.37%	472	31.07%	21	1.38%	33	2.17%	521	34.30%	1,519
Coffee	1,494	88.72%	114	6.77%	52	3.09%	24	1.43%	1,380	81.95%	1,684
Colbert	1,658	47.12%	1,754	49.84%	93	2.64%	14	0.40%	−96	−2.73%	3,519
Conecuh	931	46.36%	881	43.87%	155	7.72%	41	2.04%	50	2.49%	2,008
Coosa	1,293	68.78%	499	26.54%	49	2.61%	39	2.07%	794	42.23%	1,880
Covington	1,097	91.57%	69	5.76%	16	1.34%	16	1.34%	1,028	85.81%	1,198
Crenshaw	1,808	77.56%	330	14.16%	164	7.04%	28	1.20%	1,478	63.41%	2,331
Cullman	1,202	66.19%	447	24.61%	140	7.71%	27	1.49%	755	41.57%	1,816
Dale	2,155	83.27%	289	11.17%	94	3.63%	50	1.93%	1,866	72.10%	2,588
Dallas	4,091	87.56%	519	11.11%	52	1.11%	10	0.21%	3,572	76.46%	4,672
DeKalb	1,586	51.06%	1,446	46.56%	46	1.48%	28	0.90%	140	4.51%	3,106
Elmore	1,923	55.47%	1,379	39.78%	119	3.43%	46	1.33%	544	15.69%	3,467
Escambia	914	61.01%	482	32.18%	82	5.47%	20	1.34%	432	28.84%	1,498
Etowah	1,782	63.64%	873	31.18%	109	3.89%	36	1.29%	909	32.46%	2,800
Fayette	1,222	71.21%	441	25.70%	39	2.27%	14	0.82%	781	45.51%	1,716
Franklin	1,108	67.52%	483	29.43%	33	2.01%	17	1.04%	625	38.09%	1,641
Geneva	1,246	92.16%	46	3.40%	39	2.88%	21	1.55%	1,200	88.76%	1,352
Greene	1,864	77.47%	503	20.91%	24	1.00%	15	0.62%	1,361	56.57%	2,406
Hale	2,906	73.40%	933	23.57%	77	1.94%	43	1.09%	1,973	49.84%	3,959
Henry	3,060	75.99%	675	16.76%	246	6.11%	46	1.14%	2,385	59.23%	4,027
Jackson	3,556	81.21%	675	15.41%	117	2.67%	31	0.71%	2,881	65.79%	4,379
Jefferson	8,819	67.67%	3,394	26.04%	450	3.45%	369	2.83%	5,425	41.63%	13,032
Lamar	1,263	67.79%	509	27.32%	69	3.70%	22	1.18%	754	40.47%	1,863
Lauderdale	2,300	67.97%	1,024	30.26%	45	1.33%	15	0.44%	1,276	37.71%	3,384
Lawrence	1,248	41.48%	1,685	56.00%	31	1.03%	45	1.50%	−437	−14.52%	3,009
Lee	1,737	51.06%	1,491	43.83%	133	3.91%	41	1.21%	246	7.23%	3,402
Limestone	1,812	53.58%	1,520	44.94%	27	0.80%	23	0.68%	292	8.63%	3,382
Lowndes	3,001	81.35%	642	17.40%	40	1.08%	6	0.16%	2,359	63.95%	3,689
Macon	1,043	76.52%	259	19.00%	56	4.11%	5	0.37%	784	57.52%	1,363
Madison	4,056	60.06%	2,548	37.73%	103	1.53%	46	0.68%	1,508	22.33%	6,753
Marengo	3,168	79.80%	764	19.24%	25	0.63%	13	0.33%	2,404	60.55%	3,970
Marion	1,201	69.46%	502	29.03%	23	1.33%	3	0.17%	699	40.43%	1,729
Marshall	1,944	76.72%	520	20.52%	37	1.46%	33	1.30%	1,424	56.20%	2,534
Mobile	3,948	53.66%	2,778	37.76%	482	6.55%	149	2.03%	1,170	15.90%	7,357
Montgomery	2,653	63.17%	977	23.26%	526	12.52%	44	1.05%	1,676	39.90%	4,200
Morgan	2,128	55.46%	1,462	38.10%	195	5.08%	52	1.36%	666	17.36%	3,837
Perry	2,682	84.10%	463	14.52%	34	1.07%	10	0.31%	2,219	69.58%	3,189
Pickens	2,210	88.26%	211	8.43%	66	2.64%	17	0.68%	1,999	79.83%	2,504
Pike	2,077	63.44%	862	26.33%	292	8.92%	43	1.31%	1,215	37.11%	3,274
Randolph	1,442	62.13%	802	34.55%	55	2.37%	22	0.95%	640	27.57%	2,321
Russell	1,645	66.98%	773	31.47%	35	1.43%	3	0.12%	872	35.50%	2,456
Shelby	1,582	58.23%	1,051	38.68%	65	2.39%	19	0.70%	531	19.54%	2,717
St. Clair	1,604	70.38%	603	26.46%	47	2.06%	25	1.10%	1,001	43.92%	2,279
Sumter	1,834	52.44%	1,459	41.72%	186	5.32%	18	0.51%	375	10.72%	3,497
Talladega	1,854	64.78%	922	32.22%	49	1.71%	40	1.40%	932	32.56%	2,862
Tallapoosa	2,691	75.53%	685	19.23%	106	2.98%	81	2.27%	2,006	56.30%	3,563
Tuscaloosa	2,151	66.27%	965	29.73%	79	2.43%	51	1.57%	1,186	36.54%	3,246
Walker	1,248	52.15%	1,101	46.01%	22	0.92%	22	0.92%	147	6.14%	2,393
Washington	642	69.63%	224	24.30%	46	4.99%	10	1.08%	418	45.34%	922
Wilcox	2,956	96.95%	45	1.48%	45	1.48%	3	0.10%	2,911	95.47%	3,049
Winston	349	36.78%	589	62.07%	6	0.63%	5	0.53%	−240	−25.29%	949
Monroe (Note: No returns for Monroe County were given in the Register and no explanations were given as to where the county's voters were recorded.)	0	N/A	0	N/A	0	0	0	N/A	N/A	N/A	N/A
Totals	130,298	66.96%	55,673	28.61%	6,375	3.28%	2,234	1.15%	74,625	38.35%	194,578

== See also ==
- United States presidential elections in Alabama
