= Jonathan Daniels =

American Episcopal seminarian and civil rights activist

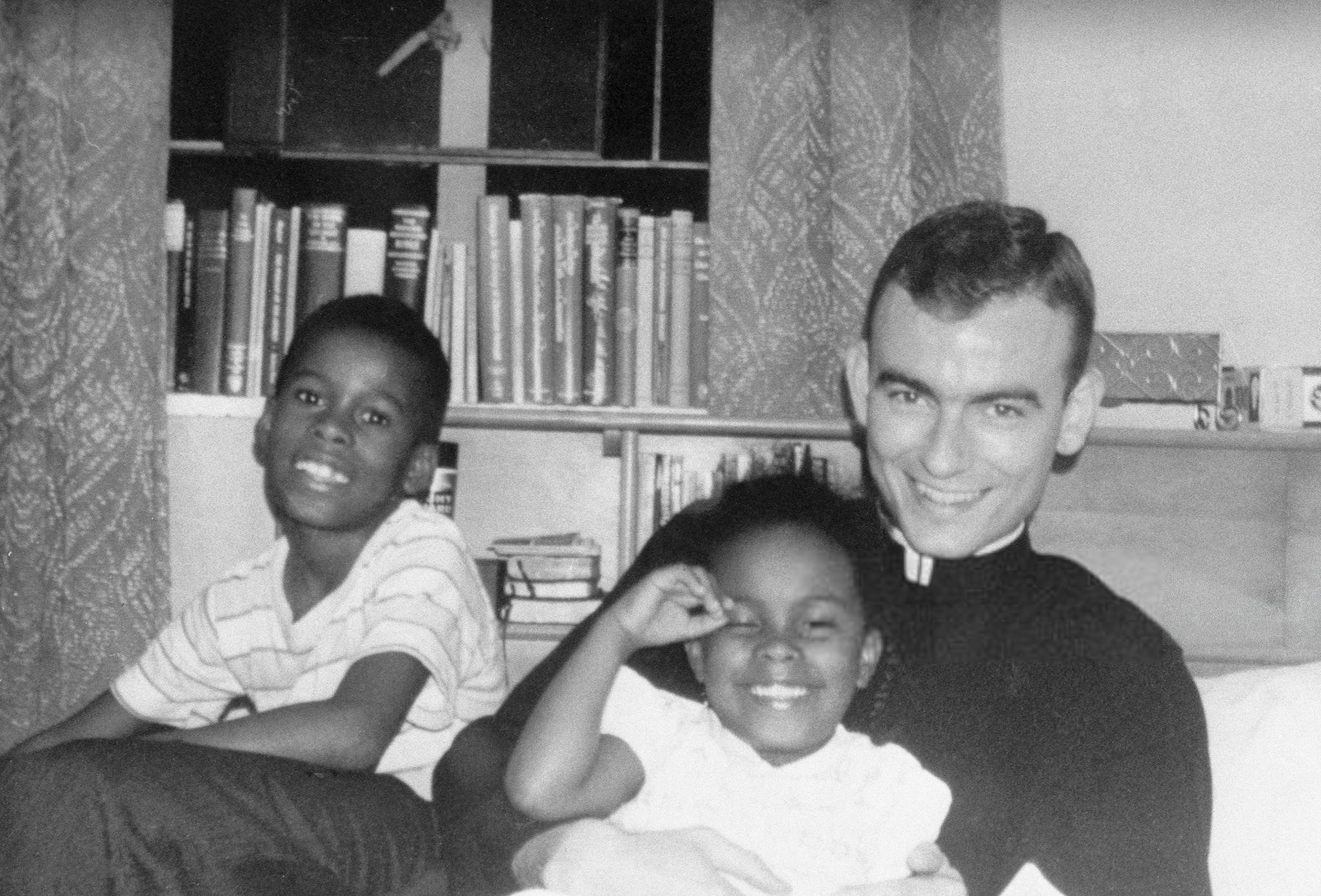
- Daniels (far right), c. 1960s

Seminarian and civil rights activist
- Born: Jonathan Myrick Daniels; March 20, 1939; Keene, New Hampshire, U.S.
- Died: August 20, 1965 (aged 26); Hayneville, Alabama, U.S.
- Venerated in: Anglican Communion
- Feast: August 14
- Patronage: Episcopal Diocese of Alabama

Jonathan Myrick Daniels (March 20, 1939 – August 20, 1965) was an Episcopal seminarian and civil rights activist. In 1965, he was killed by Tom Coleman, a highway worker and part-time deputy sheriff, in Hayneville, Alabama, while in the act of shielding 17-year-old Ruby Sales from a racist attack. He saved the life of the young Black civil rights activist. They were both working in the nonviolent civil rights movement in Lowndes County to integrate public places and register Black voters after passage of the Voting Rights Act that summer. Daniels' death generated further support for the civil rights movement.

In 1991, Daniels was designated as a martyr in the Episcopal church, and is recognized annually in its calendar.

== Background ==
Born in Keene, New Hampshire, Jonathan Myrick Daniels was the son of Phillip Brock Daniels, a physician and Congregationalist, and his wife Constance Weaver. Daniels considered a career in the ministry as early as high school and joined the Episcopal Church as a young man. Daniels enrolled at Virginia Military Institute after graduating high school. During his studies he struggled with doubts about his plan to enter the ministry. His father died during his junior year, and his sister fell ill, which put strain on his family's finances. Still, he graduated VMI as valedictorian of his class.

In the fall of 1961, Daniels entered Harvard University to study English literature. In the spring of 1962, during an Easter service at the Church of the Advent in Boston, Daniels felt a renewed conviction that he was being called to serve God. Soon after, he decided to pursue ordination. After spending a year back in Keene working odd jobs to support his family, he applied and was accepted to the Episcopal Theological School in Cambridge, Massachusetts, starting his studies in 1963 and expecting to graduate in 1966.

== Civil rights work ==
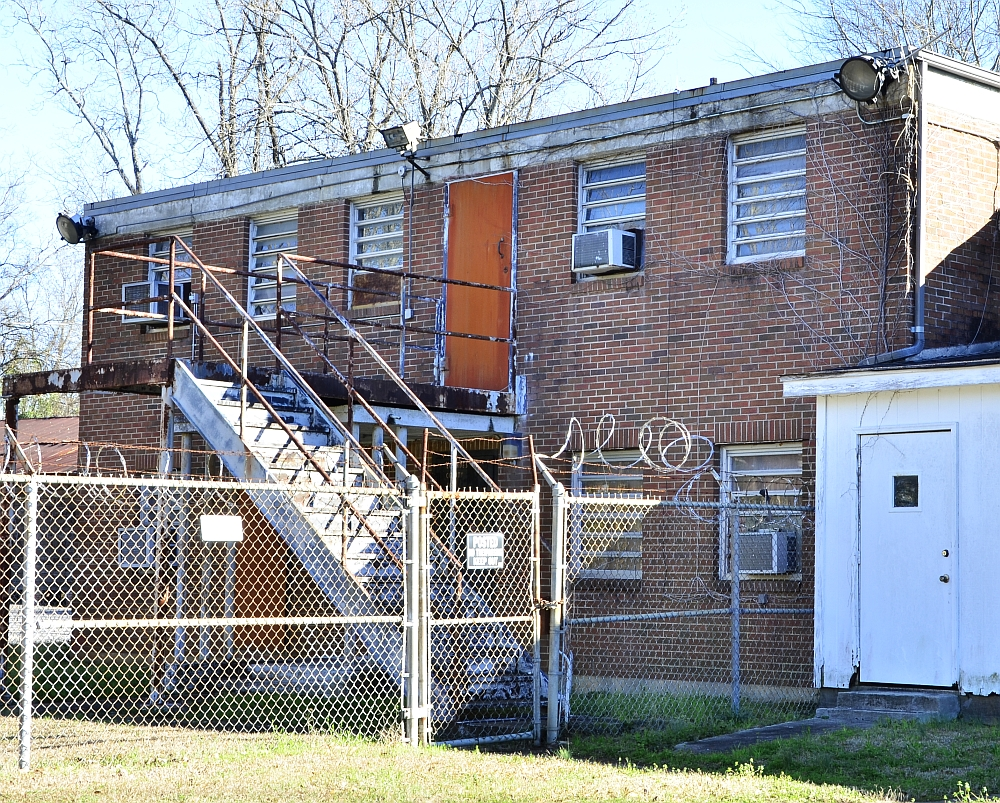
Old Hayneville Jail where Daniels and others were held

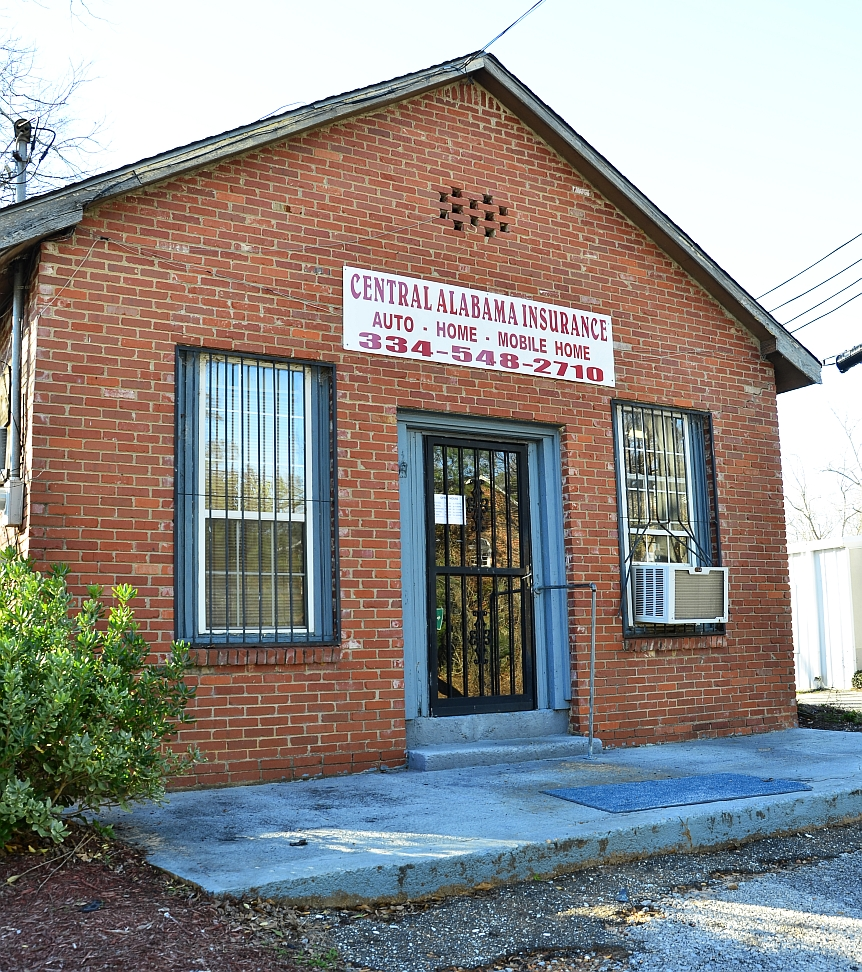
Varner's Cash Store, 2013

In March 1965, Daniels answered the call of Martin Luther King Jr., who recruited students and clergy to join the movement in Selma, Alabama, to take part in the march for voting rights from Selma to the state capital of Montgomery. Daniels and several other seminary students left for Alabama on Thursday, intending to stay the weekend. After Daniels and friend Judy Upham were delayed on the march and then missed the bus home, they had second thoughts about their short stay. The two returned to the seminary just long enough to request permission to spend the rest of the semester working in Selma.

During the spring in Selma, Daniels and Upham worked to integrate the local Episcopal church by taking groups of young African Americans to the church. The church members were not welcoming. In May, Daniels returned to the seminary to take his semester exams and passed.

Daniels went back to Alabama in July to continue his work. He helped assemble a list of federal, state, and local agencies that could provide assistance for those in need. That summer, on August 2, 1965, Congress passed the Voting Rights Act which provided broad federal oversight and enforcement of the constitutional right to vote. Before that, blacks had been effectively disenfranchised in Lowndes County, where Daniels was staying. He worked with the Student Nonviolent Coordinating Committee (SNCC) to help blacks register to vote.

== Murder ==
On August 14, 1965, Daniels was one of a group of 29 protesters, including members of the Student Nonviolent Coordinating Committee (SNCC), who went to Fort Deposit, Alabama, to picket its whites-only stores. All of the protesters were arrested. They were transported in a garbage truck to a jail in the nearby town of Hayneville. The police released five juvenile protesters the next day. The rest of the group was held for six days in a facility which lacked air conditioning. Authorities refused to accept bail for anyone unless everyone was bailed.

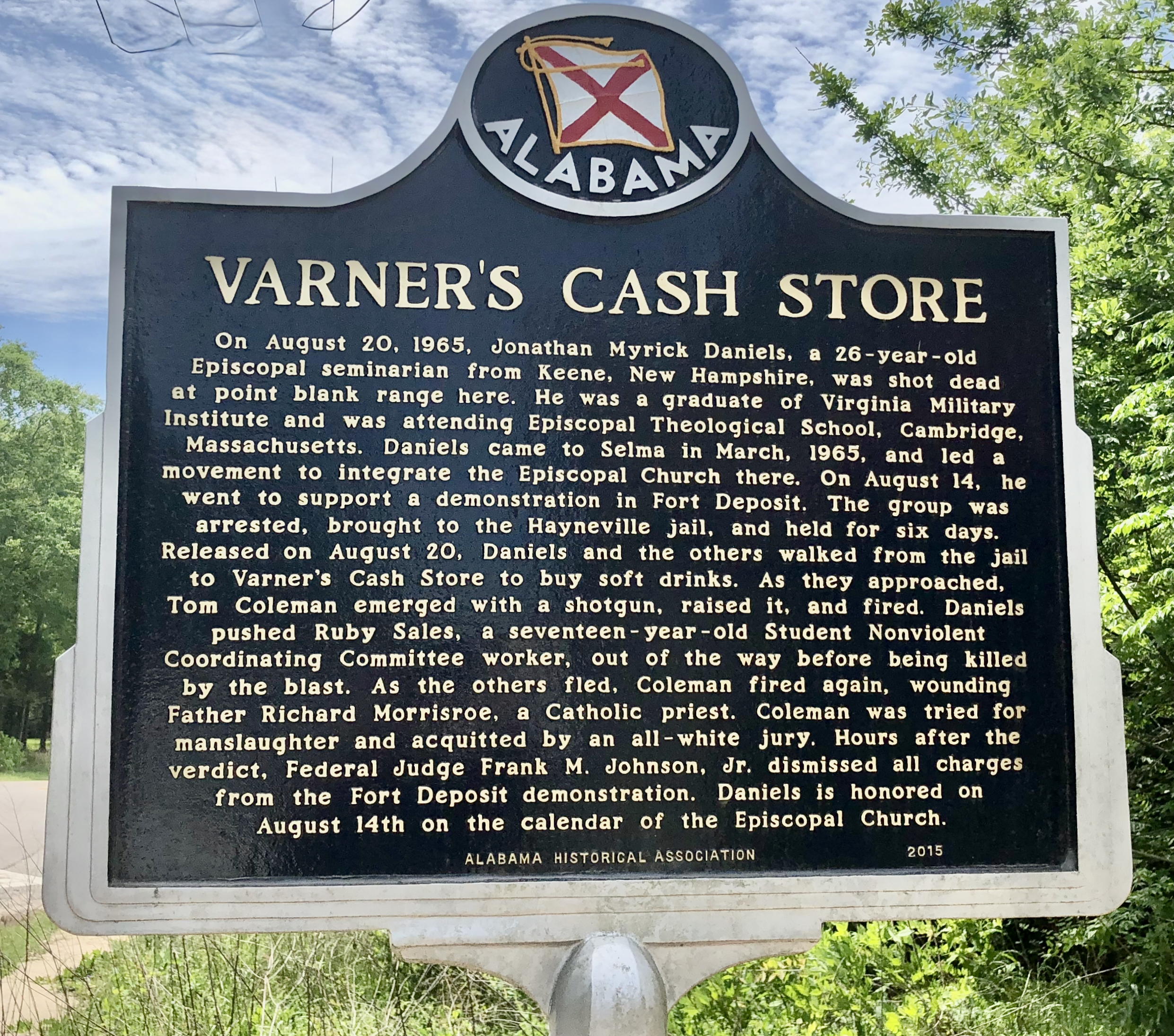

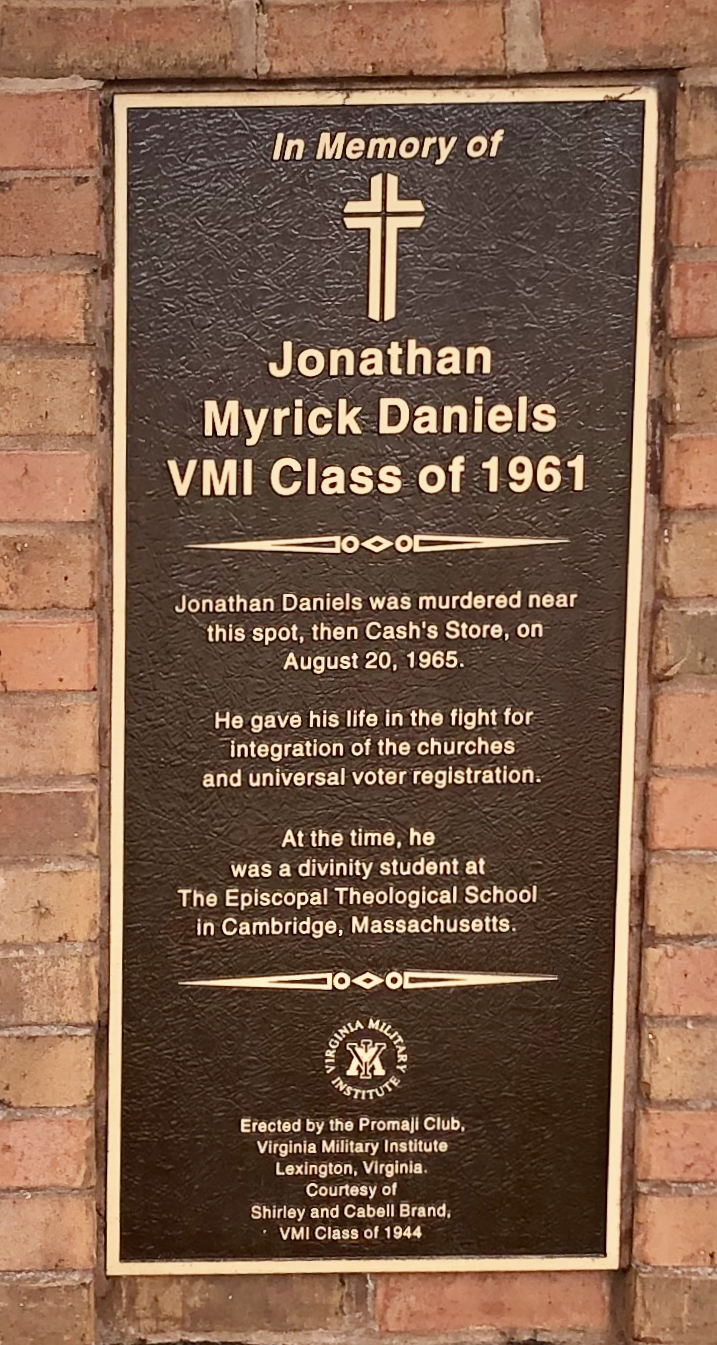
Episcopal seminarian and civil rights activist.

Finally, on August 20, the prisoners were released without transport back to Fort Deposit. After release, the group waited near the courthouse jail while one of their members called for transport. Daniels and three others—a white Catholic priest and two black female activists—walked to buy a cold soft drink at nearby Varner's Cash Store, one of the few local places to serve non-whites. But barring the front was Tom L. Coleman, an unpaid special deputy who was holding a shotgun and had a pistol in a holster. Coleman threatened the group and leveled his gun at seventeen-year-old Ruby Sales. Daniels pushed Sales down and caught the full blast of the shotgun and was instantly killed. Father Richard F. Morrisroe grabbed activist Joyce Bailey and ran with her. Coleman shot Morrisroe, severely wounding him in the lower back, and then stopped firing.

Upon learning of Daniels' murder, Martin Luther King Jr. stated that "one of the most heroic Christian deeds of which I have heard in my entire ministry was performed by Jonathan Daniels."

A grand jury indicted Coleman for manslaughter. Richmond Flowers Sr., the Attorney General of Alabama, believed the charge should have been murder and intervened in the prosecution, but was thwarted by the trial judge T. Werth Thagard. He refused to wait until Morrisroe had recovered enough to testify and removed Flowers from the case. Coleman claimed self-defense, although Morrisroe and the others were unarmed, and was acquitted of manslaughter charges by an all-white jury. Disfranchisement had resulted in excluding blacks from jury duty, as only voters were called. Flowers described the verdict as representing the "democratic process going down the drain of irrationality, bigotry and improper law enforcement."

Coleman continued working as an engineer for the state highway department. He died at the age of 86 on June 13, 1997, without having faced further prosecution.

== Aftermath ==
The murder of an educated, white seminarian who was defending an unarmed teenage girl shocked members of the Episcopal Church and other whites into facing the violent reality of racial inequality in the South. Other members worked to continue the civil rights movement and work for social justice.

Ruby Sales went on to attend Episcopal Theological School (later Episcopal Divinity School). She worked as a human rights advocate in Washington, DC, and founded an inner-city mission dedicated to Daniels.

== Commemorations ==
- A sculpture group, The Garden of Gethsemani (1965–66) by sculptor Walker Hancock, was dedicated to Daniels when installed at the Abbey of Our Lady of Gethsemani in Bardstown, Kentucky
- In 1991, the Episcopal Church designated Jonathan Myrick Daniels as a martyr, and August 14 was designated as a day of remembrance for the sacrifice of Daniels and all the martyrs of the civil rights movement. The church also recognizes Martin Luther King Jr.
- In 1991, a memorial plaque was erected in the town square in Hayneville by Promaji Club of Virginia Military Institute.
- Daniels is one of 15 Episcopal martyrs to have been designated since the start of the 20th century.
- Daniels was the subject of historian Charles Eagles' book Outside Agitator: Jon Daniels and the Civil Rights Movement in Alabama (1993), which won the Lillian Smith Award that year.
- Since 1997, the Episcopal Diocese of Alabama and the Episcopal Diocese of the Central Gulf Coast have sponsor a yearly pilgrimage in Hayneville on August 14, to commemorate Daniels and all other martyrs of the civil rights movement.
- The Virginia Military Institute created the Jonathan Daniels Humanitarian Award in 1998; awardees include former president Jimmy Carter. Additionally, VMI erected a memorial quote in barracks.
- One of the five elementary schools in Daniels' hometown of Keene, New Hampshire, is named after him. Daniels is one of 40 martyrs memorialized at the Southern Poverty Law Center's Civil Rights Memorial in Montgomery, Alabama.
- A New Hampshire historical marker (number 226) about Daniels was erected in Keene in 2011.
- In November 2013, the Episcopal Diocese of Rhode Island announced its plan to open the Jonathan Daniels House, a service-oriented intentional community for young adults, as part of the national Episcopal Service Corps program.
- In 2013, the Order of Saint Luke, a religious order in the United Methodist Church, added Daniels to their calendar of saints and recommended his commemoration to all United Methodists.
- In 2015, Washington National Cathedral unveiled and dedicated a sculpture of Daniels within its Human Rights Porch, designed by Chas Fagan and sculpted by stonemason Sean Callahan. Looking on at the dedication was the woman Daniels saved, Ruby Sales.
- Daniels is honored by a stained glass window at All Saints' Episcopal Church in Austin, Texas, depicted standing with Absalom Jones, a former slave who was the first African-American to be ordained as an Episcopal priest in the United States.
- In 2025 icon of Jonathan Daniels was donated to Jonathan's home church, St. James Episcopal Church, in Keene, New Hampshire.
- In January 2025, Daniels was named the patron of the Episcopal Diocese of Alabama.

== Representation in other media ==
- A play by Lowell Williams, Six Nights in the Black Belt, chronicles events related to the arrests in Fort Deposit, six nights in jail, and Daniels' murder. It also explores the relationship between Daniels and Stokely Carmichael, then a member of the Student Nonviolent Coordinating Committee, with whom he shared a jail cell in Hayneville.
- Daniels and his murder were referred to in the TV film Selma, Lord, Selma (1999). He was played by Mackenzie Astin.
- The Civil Rights memoir Brother to a Dragonfly by Will Campbell includes the account of Daniels' murder.
- The film Here Am I, Send Me: The Story of Jonathan Daniels (2000) documents his life and murder.
