= 1932 United States presidential election in Alabama =

- November 8, 1932

All 11 Alabama votes to the Electoral College

Nominee	Franklin D. Roosevelt	Herbert Hoover
Party	Democratic	Republican
Home state	New York	California
Running mate	John Nance Garner	Charles Curtis
Electoral vote	11	0
Popular vote	207,910	34,675
Percentage	84.76%	14.14%
County results
Roosevelt
40–50%
50–60%
60–70%
70–80%
80–90%
90–100%
President before election
Herbert Hoover
Republican
Elected President
Franklin D. Roosevelt
Democratic

The 1932 United States presidential election in Alabama took place on November 8, 1932, as part of the nationwide presidential election. Alabama voters chose eleven representatives, or electors, to the Electoral College, who voted for president and vice president. In Alabama, voters voted for electors individually instead of as a slate, as in the other states.

Since the 1890s, Alabama had been effectively a one-party state ruled by the Democratic Party. Disenfranchisement of almost all African-Americans and a large proportion of poor whites via poll taxes, literacy tests and informal harassment had essentially eliminated opposition parties outside of Unionist Winston County and a few nearby northern hill counties that had been Populist strongholds. The only competitive statewide elections became Democratic Party primaries that were limited by law to white voters. Unlike most other Confederate states, however, soon after black disenfranchisement Alabama's remaining white Republicans made rapid efforts to expel blacks from the state Republican Party. Indeed, under Oscar D. Street, who ironically was appointed state party boss as part of the pro-Taft "black and tan" faction in 1912, the state GOP would permanently turn "lily-white", with the last black delegates from the state at any Republican National Convention serving in 1920.

The 1920 election, aided by isolationism in Appalachia and the whitening of the state GOP, saw the Republicans gain their best presidential vote share in Alabama since 1884, while the GOP even exceed forty percent in the House of Representatives races for the 4th, 7th and 10th congressional districts. However, isolationist sentiment in Appalachia would ease after the election of Warren G. Harding while funding issues meant the Republicans would not emulate their efforts in the rest of the decade.

Then in 1928, a virtual "civil war" broke out in the state Democratic Party over the nomination of Al Smith, as the hegemonic Democratic Party was placed in a quandary over the nomination of an urban, Catholic, racial liberal. The loyalists centred in the Black Belt supported Smith and the traditional Democratic Party as the best route to maintaining absolute white supremacy through encouraging capital investment, whereas the "Hoovercrats" led by former leaders of the Ku Klux Klan backed Republican Herbert Hoover and were intensely focused on nativism, Prohibition and Protestant fundamentalism.

After Smith narrowly carried the state, Hoovercrat leader James Thomas Heflin would not be renominated for the Senate in 1930, while the economic catastrophe of the Great Depression meant that this trend towards the GOP would be short-lived. The Depression had extremely severe effects in the South, which had the highest unemployment rate in the nation, and many Southerners blamed this on the North and on Wall Street, rejecting Hoover's claim that the Depression's causes were exogenous. No campaigning was done in the state, and polls showed always that Democratic nominees Governor Franklin D. Roosevelt and Speaker John Nance Garner would re-establish the large margins by which the state had been won before 1928. An early October poll showed Roosevelt leading incumbent President Herbert Hoover and Vice President Charles Curtis by a nine-to-two majority. This poll underestimated the return of the Hoovercrats to the party, for Roosevelt won 84.74 percent of the vote to a mere 14.13 percent for Hoover. This remains the only time in history that any presidential candidate has won every single county in Alabama, due to Roosevelt carrying Southern Unionist and reliably Republican Winston County by just a single vote.

== Results ==
General election results
Party	Pledged to	Elector	Votes
Democratic Party	Franklin D. Roosevelt	L. R. Tucker	207,910
Democratic Party	Franklin D. Roosevelt	W. C. Davis	207,832
Democratic Party	Franklin D. Roosevelt	H. B. Fuller	207,773
Democratic Party	Franklin D. Roosevelt	B. H. Cooper	207,763
Democratic Party	Franklin D. Roosevelt	H. D. Agnew	207,760
Democratic Party	Franklin D. Roosevelt	Jas. B. Stanley	207,756
Democratic Party	Franklin D. Roosevelt	W. F. Miller	207,751
Democratic Party	Franklin D. Roosevelt	Bernard Harwood	207,723
Democratic Party	Franklin D. Roosevelt	T. E. Buntin	207,711
Democratic Party	Franklin D. Roosevelt	R. E. Jones	207,661
Democratic Party	Franklin D. Roosevelt	Y. M. Quinn	207,635
Republican Party	Herbert Hoover (incumbent)	Frank H. Lathrop	34,675
Republican Party	Herbert Hoover (incumbent)	Precy Pitts	34,664
Republican Party	Herbert Hoover (incumbent)	S. B. Adams	34,663
Republican Party	Herbert Hoover (incumbent)	Victor Hovis	34,657
Republican Party	Herbert Hoover (incumbent)	J. M. Pennington	34,655
Republican Party	Herbert Hoover (incumbent)	C. W. McKay	34,655
Republican Party	Herbert Hoover (incumbent)	C. P. Lunsford	34,654
Republican Party	Herbert Hoover (incumbent)	Arthur B. Fowler	34,649
Republican Party	Herbert Hoover (incumbent)	W. A. Clardy	34,647
Republican Party	Herbert Hoover (incumbent)	Leon McCalebe	34,634
Republican Party	Herbert Hoover (incumbent)	C. E. Roberts	34,628
Socialist Party of America	Norman Thomas	M. D. Alexander	2,030
Socialist Party of America	Norman Thomas	Otis H. Britton	2,029
Socialist Party of America	Norman Thomas	T. D. Hendrix	2,026
Socialist Party of America	Norman Thomas	C. G. Hutchisson	2,025
Socialist Party of America	Norman Thomas	Orville H. Mastin	2,025
Socialist Party of America	Norman Thomas	J. O. Meadows	2,025
Socialist Party of America	Norman Thomas	George Wilson	2,025
Socialist Party of America	Norman Thomas	Paul Nichols	2,023
Socialist Party of America	Norman Thomas	E. E. Stuart	2,023
Socialist Party of America	Norman Thomas	Henry Trapp	2,020
Socialist Party of America	Norman Thomas	W. Frank Wynne	2,020
Communist Party USA	William Z. Foster	Andrew M. Forsman	726
Communist Party USA	William Z. Foster	John A. Lindquist	676
Prohibition Party	William David Upshaw	William David Upshaw	13
Total votes			245,354

=== Results by county ===
County	Franklin D. Roosevelt Democratic		Herbert Hoover Republican		Norman Thomas Socialist		William Z. Foster Communist		William D. Upshaw Prohibition		Margin		Total votes cast
County	#	%	#	%	#	%	#	%	#	%	#	%	Total votes cast
Autauga	1,322	89.81%	138	9.38%	11	0.75%	1	0.07%	0	0.00%	1,184	80.43%	1,472
Baldwin	2,097	75.43%	544	19.57%	131	4.71%	8	0.29%	0	0.00%	1,553	55.86%	2,780
Barbour	2,207	96.88%	64	2.81%	6	0.26%	1	0.04%	0	0.00%	2,143	94.07%	2,278
Bibb	1,636	90.29%	145	8.00%	31	1.71%	0	0.00%	0	0.00%	1,491	82.28%	1,812
Blount	2,232	77.99%	582	20.34%	43	1.50%	5	0.17%	0	0.00%	1,650	57.65%	2,862
Bullock	1,004	98.72%	12	1.18%	1	0.10%	0	0.00%	0	0.00%	992	97.54%	1,017
Butler	2,280	96.45%	74	3.13%	9	0.38%	1	0.04%	0	0.00%	2,206	93.32%	2,364
Calhoun	4,392	85.98%	685	13.41%	28	0.55%	3	0.06%	0	0.00%	3,707	72.57%	5,108
Chambers	2,552	87.85%	342	11.77%	7	0.24%	4	0.14%	0	0.00%	2,210	76.08%	2,905
Cherokee	1,897	83.09%	359	15.72%	23	1.01%	4	0.18%	0	0.00%	1,538	67.37%	2,283
Chilton	1,664	51.17%	1,533	47.14%	53	1.63%	2	0.06%	0	0.00%	131	4.03%	3,252
Choctaw	1,533	96.90%	48	3.03%	1	0.06%	0	0.00%	0	0.00%	1,485	93.87%	1,582
Clarke	2,408	97.69%	53	2.15%	3	0.12%	1	0.04%	0	0.00%	2,355	95.54%	2,465
Clay	2,104	68.78%	933	30.50%	13	0.42%	9	0.29%	0	0.00%	1,171	38.28%	3,059
Cleburne	1,403	77.43%	405	22.35%	2	0.11%	2	0.11%	0	0.00%	998	55.08%	1,812
Coffee	2,868	96.73%	95	3.20%	1	0.03%	1	0.03%	0	0.00%	2,773	93.52%	2,965
Colbert	2,908	89.64%	312	9.62%	24	0.74%	0	0.00%	0	0.00%	2,596	80.02%	3,244
Conecuh	2,125	94.91%	114	5.09%	0	0.00%	0	0.00%	0	0.00%	2,011	89.82%	2,239
Coosa	1,265	82.63%	250	16.33%	15	0.98%	1	0.07%	0	0.00%	1,015	66.30%	1,531
Covington	3,855	97.15%	99	2.49%	10	0.25%	4	0.10%	0	0.00%	3,756	94.66%	3,968
Crenshaw	2,248	93.20%	127	5.27%	3	0.12%	30	1.24%	4	0.17%	2,121	87.94%	2,412
Cullman	2,910	73.78%	956	24.24%	71	1.80%	7	0.18%	0	0.00%	1,954	49.54%	3,944
Dale	2,300	93.65%	155	6.31%	1	0.04%	0	0.00%	0	0.00%	2,145	87.34%	2,456
Dallas	3,027	96.62%	93	2.97%	12	0.38%	1	0.03%	0	0.00%	2,934	93.65%	3,133
DeKalb	4,217	54.13%	3,496	44.88%	73	0.94%	4	0.05%	0	0.00%	721	9.26%	7,790
Elmore	3,197	87.88%	159	4.37%	7	0.19%	275	7.56%	0	0.00%	2,922 (Note: In this county where Foster ran second ahead of Hoover, margin given is Roosevelt vote minus Foster vote and percentage margin Roosevelt percentage minus Foster percentage.)	80.32%	3,638
Escambia	2,024	92.67%	157	7.19%	3	0.14%	0	0.00%	0	0.00%	1,867	85.49%	2,184
Etowah	5,167	82.08%	1,066	16.93%	62	0.98%	0	0.00%	0	0.00%	4,101	65.15%	6,295
Fayette	2,013	72.70%	733	26.47%	19	0.69%	4	0.14%	0	0.00%	1,280	46.23%	2,769
Franklin	2,876	64.53%	1,547	34.71%	34	0.76%	0	0.00%	0	0.00%	1,329	29.82%	4,457
Geneva	2,559	90.33%	270	9.53%	1	0.04%	3	0.11%	0	0.00%	2,289	80.80%	2,833
Greene	665	95.82%	9	1.30%	20	2.88%	0	0.00%	0	0.00%	645 (Note: In this county where Thomas ran second ahead of Hoover, margin given is Roosevelt vote minus Thomas vote and percentage margin Roosevelt percentage minus Thomas percentage.)	92.94%	694
Hale	1,276	94.59%	70	5.19%	1	0.07%	2	0.15%	0	0.00%	1,206	89.40%	1,349
Henry	1,741	97.43%	42	2.35%	4	0.22%	0	0.00%	0	0.00%	1,699	95.08%	1,787
Houston	3,863	95.83%	157	3.89%	7	0.17%	2	0.05%	2	0.05%	3,706	91.94%	4,031
Jackson	3,112	76.69%	938	23.11%	8	0.20%	0	0.00%	0	0.00%	2,174	53.57%	4,058
Jefferson	30,858	85.15%	4,567	12.60%	779	2.15%	34	0.09%	1	0.00%	26,291	72.55%	36,239
Lamar	2,207	89.24%	258	10.43%	4	0.16%	4	0.16%	0	0.00%	1,949	78.81%	2,473
Lauderdale	3,336	88.09%	431	11.38%	19	0.50%	1	0.03%	0	0.00%	2,905	76.71%	3,787
Lawrence	1,920	86.53%	299	13.47%	0	0.00%	0	0.00%	0	0.00%	1,621	73.05%	2,219
Lee	1,988	94.53%	103	4.90%	11	0.52%	1	0.05%	0	0.00%	1,885	89.63%	2,103
Limestone	2,667	95.94%	107	3.85%	5	0.18%	1	0.04%	0	0.00%	2,560	92.09%	2,780
Lowndes	1,073	98.35%	18	1.65%	0	0.00%	0	0.00%	0	0.00%	1,055	96.70%	1,091
Macon	905	94.07%	56	5.82%	1	0.10%	0	0.00%	0	0.00%	849	88.25%	962
Madison	4,795	88.76%	559	10.35%	45	0.83%	3	0.06%	0	0.00%	4,236	78.42%	5,402
Marengo	2,097	95.45%	50	2.28%	50	2.28%	0	0.00%	0	0.00%	2,047	93.17%	2,197
Marion	2,325	80.73%	545	18.92%	5	0.17%	1	0.03%	4	0.14%	1,780	61.81%	2,880
Marshall	3,921	79.45%	904	18.32%	65	1.32%	45	0.91%	0	0.00%	3,017	61.13%	4,935
Mobile	9,658	84.37%	1,710	14.94%	61	0.53%	18	0.16%	0	0.00%	7,948	69.43%	11,447
Monroe	1,972	96.52%	66	3.23%	3	0.15%	2	0.10%	0	0.00%	1,906	93.29%	2,043
Montgomery	10,066	95.57%	441	4.19%	18	0.17%	8	0.08%	0	0.00%	9,625	91.38%	10,533
Morgan	4,896	86.62%	656	11.61%	31	0.55%	69	1.22%	0	0.00%	4,240	75.02%	5,652
Perry	1,382	95.05%	37	2.54%	2	0.14%	33	2.27%	0	0.00%	1,345	92.50%	1,454
Pickens	1,479	87.10%	128	7.54%	9	0.53%	82	4.83%	0	0.00%	1,351	79.56%	1,698
Pike	2,545	97.92%	52	2.00%	1	0.04%	1	0.04%	0	0.00%	2,493	95.92%	2,599
Randolph	2,227	74.09%	767	25.52%	10	0.33%	2	0.07%	0	0.00%	1,460	48.57%	3,006
Russell	1,894	97.28%	46	2.36%	5	0.26%	2	0.10%	0	0.00%	1,848	94.92%	1,947
Shelby	2,365	72.48%	864	26.48%	33	1.01%	1	0.03%	0	0.00%	1,501	46.00%	3,263
St. Clair	2,185	59.46%	1,449	39.43%	38	1.03%	3	0.08%	0	0.00%	736	20.03%	3,675
Sumter	1,293	98.03%	26	1.97%	0	0.00%	0	0.00%	0	0.00%	1,267	96.06%	1,319
Talladega	3,353	84.33%	617	15.52%	4	0.10%	2	0.05%	0	0.00%	2,736	68.81%	3,976
Tallapoosa	3,391	95.87%	138	3.90%	6	0.17%	2	0.06%	0	0.00%	3,253	91.97%	3,537
Tuscaloosa	5,322	94.08%	302	5.34%	28	0.49%	4	0.07%	1	0.02%	5,020	88.74%	5,657
Walker	4,734	74.31%	1,583	24.85%	44	0.69%	10	0.16%	0	0.00%	3,151	49.46%	6,371
Washington	1,307	94.10%	81	5.83%	1	0.07%	0	0.00%	0	0.00%	1,226	88.26%	1,389
Wilcox	1,358	98.33%	23	1.67%	0	0.00%	0	0.00%	0	0.00%	1,335	96.67%	1,381
Winston	1,006	49.83%	1,005	49.78%	7	0.35%	1	0.05%	0	0.00%	1	0.05%	2,019
Totals	207,910	84.76%	34,675	14.14%	2,030	0.83%	675	0.28%	13	0.01%	173,235	70.62%	245,303

==== Counties that flipped from Republican to Democratic ====
- Baldwin
- Blount
- Calhoun
- Chambers
- Cherokee
- Chilton
- Choctaw
- Clay
- Cleburne
- Conecuh
- Coosa
- Cullman
- DeKalb
- Elmore
- Escambia
- Etowah
- Fayette
- Franklin
- Geneva
- Jackson
- Jefferson
- Madison
- Marshall
- Morgan
- Randolph
- St. Clair
- Shelby
- Winston

== See also ==
- United States presidential elections in Alabama
