= Ruby Sales =

African-American social justice activist, scholar, and theologian

- Born: Ruby Nell Sales; July 8, 1948 (age 78); Jemison, Alabama, U.S.
- Occupation: Civil rights activist

External videos
- Civil Rights History Project: Ruby Nell Sales, 1:32:24, Library of Congress
- October 11, 2015: "The Legacy of Jonathan Daniels" with Ruby Sales, 47:47, Washington National Cathedral

Ruby Nell Sales (born July 8, 1948 in Jemison, Alabama) is an African-American social justice activist, scholar, and public theologian. She has been described as a "legendary civil rights activist" by the PBS program Religion and Ethics Weekly, and is one of 50 civil rights leaders showcased by the Smithsonian National Museum of African American History and Culture in Washington, DC.

She has degrees from Tuskegee Institute, Manhattanville College, and Princeton University. She received a Masters of Divinity from the Episcopal Divinity School in 1998. Sales is the founder and director of the Spirit House Project, and regularly speaks throughout the country about race, class, and reconciliation.

== Early life ==
Sales attended local segregated schools including Carver High School, and was also educated in the community during the 1960s era of the Civil Rights Movement.

== Civil rights activism ==
After graduating from high school, Sales attended Tuskegee Institute where she became involved in the Student Nonviolent Coordinating Committee (SNCC). At the age of 17, she marched in the Selma to Montgomery marches of 1965.

== 1965 shooting incident ==
In the summer of 1965, Sales left Tuskegee to work full-time as a voter registration organizer as part of the U.S. Civil Rights Movement. SNCC assigned her to Calhoun County, Alabama. Students in Fort Deposit, a small town in Lowndes County, asked SNCC for its support in a demonstration aimed at protesting the local store-owner's treatment of their sharecropper parents and the organization sent members from various counties to join their cause. Sales acknowledged that she and the others were scared, and that violence and intimidation in "Bloody Lowndes" had been well-documented. Sales was one of the 30 people who took part in the demonstration on August 14, 1965.

Many members of the group were arrested and taken to the county seat of Hayneville. After being jailed for six days, the group was suddenly released. No advance notice was given, so there was no one available to pick the demonstrators up. She and a few others went to a nearby store to get something to drink. There she and the group were threatened by a shotgun-wielding state highway department employee, Tom Coleman, who was also a volunteer county deputy. One of Sales' fellow marchers, Jonathan Daniels, a White Episcopal seminarian, pushed her out of the way and took the shot meant for her, dying instantly. Daniels was a 1961 graduate of the Virginia Military Institute (VMI) and valedictorian of his class, and was studying at the Episcopal Theological School in Cambridge, Massachusetts.

Sales was so traumatized by Daniels' murder that she did not speak for the next several months. Despite death threats made to her and her family, Sales resolved to testify at Tom Coleman's trial. He was acquitted by a jury of 12 white men and said in a CBS television interview a year after the killings that he had no regrets, declaring, "I would shoot them both tomorrow."

== Continued civil rights activism ==
Sales went on to attend Episcopal Divinity School in Cambridge, Massachusetts, successor institution to the seminary Daniels had attended. She has worked as a human rights advocate in Washington, D.C., and across the south.

=== The Spirit House Project ===
Sales founded the Spirit House Project, a non-profit organization and inner-city mission dedicated to Daniels.

Starting in 2007, the Spirit House Project documented over 2,000 state-sanctioned deaths against Black people. 98 percent of those counted in that number were unarmed. "It is not by accident that Black Lives Matter is a theme today," said Sales. She believes "Black Lives Matter" has always been a theme of the fight for justice even in slavery. At a 2014 conference she organized in Washington, DC, Sales contended that saying "All Lives Matter" as a response to the slogan "Black Lives Matter" is an act that perpetuates White nationalism. The Conference was titled "What's Behind the Wave of Police and Vigilante Killings of Black People?" (April 22, 2014, Washington, DC). The conference was coordinated by Sales and Cheryl Blankenship.

== Bibliography ==
- Combs, Barbara Harris (2013). From Selma to Montgomery: The Long March to Freedom. Routledge. ISBN 9781136173769.
- Daniels, Jonathan Myrick (1992) [1967]. Schneider, William J. (ed.). American Martyr: The Jon Daniels Story. Harrisburg, PA: Morehouse Publishing. ISBN 978-0819215864. Originally published as The Jon Daniels Story: with his Letters and Papers (New York: Seabury Press, 1967).
- Eagles, Charles (2000) [1993]. Outside Agitator: Jon Daniels and the Civil Rights Movement in Alabama. Tuscaloosa: University of Alabama Press. ISBN 978-0817310691. Originally published under same title by the University of North Carolina Press (Chapel Hill, 1993).
- Wallace, Rich and Sandra Neil (2016). Blood Brother: Jonathan Daniels and His Sacrifice for Civil Rights. Honesdale, PA: Calkins Creek..
