= Lowndes County, Alabama =

County in Alabama, United States

- County
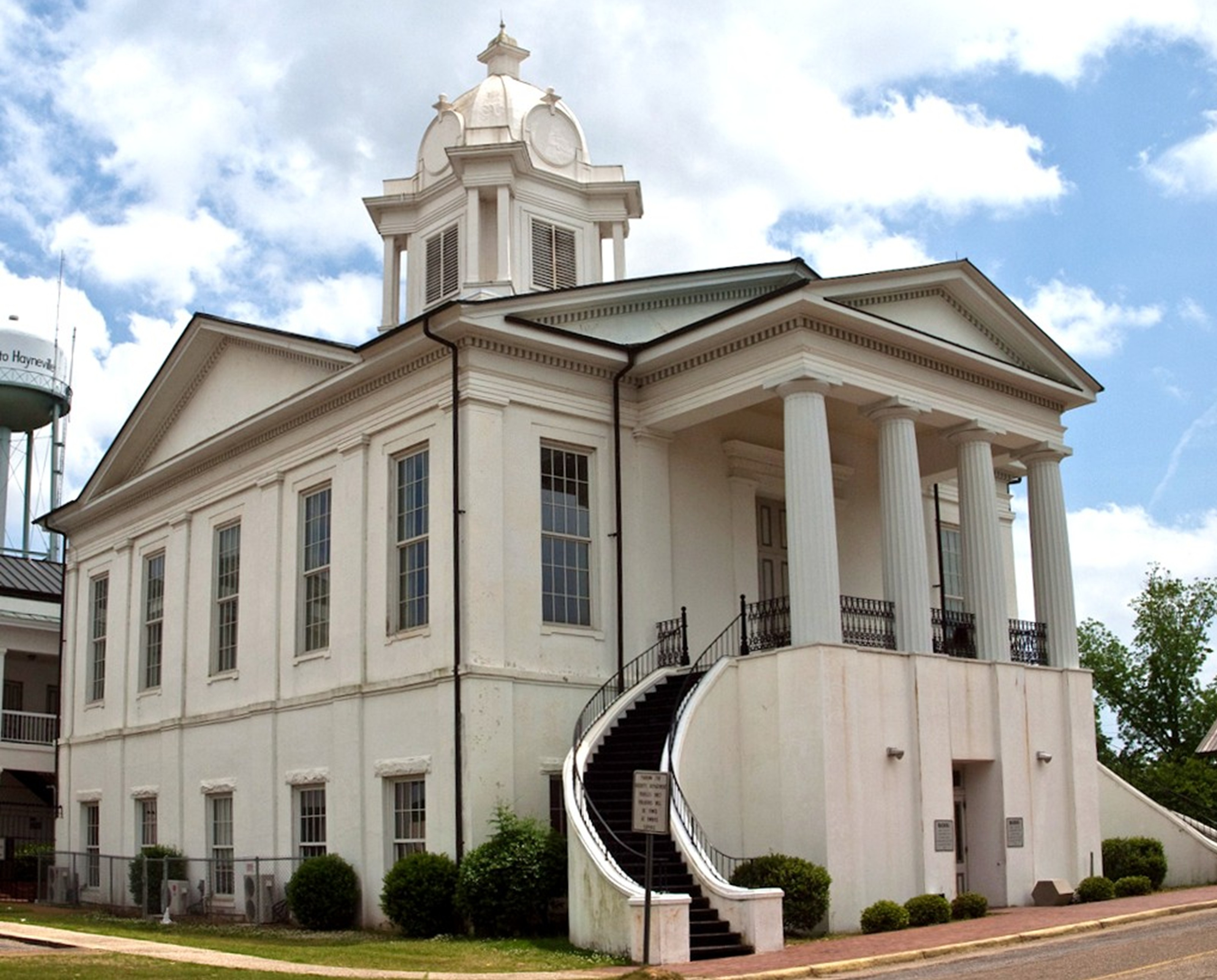
- Lowndes County Courthouse in Hayneville

- Seal

- Location within the U.S. state of Alabama
- Coordinates: 32°09′N 86°39′W
- Country: United States
- State: Alabama
- Founded: January 20, 1830
- Named for: William Jones Lowndes
- Seat: Hayneville
- Largest town: Fort Deposit

Area
  - Total: 725 sq mi (1,880 km^{2})
  - Land: 716 sq mi (1,850 km^{2})
  - Water: 9.2 sq mi (24 km^{2}) 1.3%

Population (2020)
  - Total: 10,311
  - Estimate (2025): 9,359 ▼
  - Density: 14.4/sq mi (5.56/km^{2})
- Time zone: UTC−6 (Central)
  - Summer (DST): UTC−5 (CDT)
- Congressional district: 7th
- Website: www.lowndes-al.gov
- County number 45 on Alabama license plates

Lowndes County is in the central part of the U.S. state of Alabama. As of the 2020 census, the county's population was 10,311. Its county seat is Hayneville. The county is named in honor of William Lowndes, a member of the United States Congress from South Carolina.

Lowndes County is part of the Montgomery, Alabama Metropolitan Statistical Area. Historically it has been considered part of the Black Belt, known for its fertile soil, cotton plantations, and a high number of African American workers, enslaved and later freed.

== History ==
Lowndes County was formed from Montgomery, Dallas and Butler counties, by an act of the Alabama General Assembly on January 20, 1830. The county is named for South Carolina statesman William Lowndes. It is part of the Black Belt, where cotton plantations were developed in the antebellum years and agriculture continued as a dominant part of the economy into the 20th century.

During the Reconstruction era, Black people were elected to local and state offices. White Democrats regained power and control of the state legislature in 1874 and drove the remaining office holders out. They adopted the 1875 Constitution of Alabama and another in 1901 that disenfranchised most blacks and many poor whites. Requirements were added for payment of a cumulative poll tax before registering to vote, difficult for poor people to manage who often had no cash on hand; and literacy tests (with a provision for a grandfather clause to exempt illiterate white voters from being excluded.) The number of black voters on the rolls fell dramatically in the next few years, as did the number of poor white voters.

From the end of the 19th through the early decades of the 20th centuries, organized white violence increased against blacks, with 16 lynchings recorded in the county, the fourth-highest total in the state, which historically is among those in the South with the highest per capita rate of lynchings. Most victims were black men, subjected to white extra-legal efforts to maintain white supremacy by racial terrorism. Seven of these murders were committed in Letohatchee, an unincorporated community south of Montgomery; five in 1900 and two in 1917. In 1900 mobs killed a black man accused of killing a white man. When local black resident Jim Cross objected, he was killed, too, at his house, followed by his wife, son and daughter. In 1917 two black brothers were killed by a white mob for alleged "insolence" to a white farmer on the road. On July 31, 2016, a historical marker was erected at Letohatchee by the Equal Justice Initiative in coordination with the city to commemorate the people who had suffered these extrajudicial executions.

Because of the shift in agriculture and the Great Migration of blacks to leave oppressive conditions, population in the rural county has declined by two thirds since the 1900 high of more than 35,000. The effects of farm mechanization and the boll weevil infestation, which decimated the cotton crops and reduced the need for farm labor in the 1920s and 1930s, caused widespread loss of jobs.

=== Civil Rights Era ===
By 1960 (as shown on census tables below), the population had declined to about 15,000 residents and was about 80 percent-majority black. The rural county was referred to as "Bloody Lowndes", the rusty buckle of Alabama's Black Belt, because of the high rate of white violence against blacks to maintain segregation. In 1965, a century after the American Civil War and decades after whites had disenfranchised blacks via the 1901 state constitution, they maintained white supremacy by intimidation and violence, suppressing black voting.

County population had fallen by more than half from its 1900 high, as both blacks and whites moved to urban areas. Blacks still outnumbered whites by a 4-to-1 ratio. Eighty-six white families owned 90 percent of the land in the county and controlled the government, as whites had since 1901. With an economy based on agriculture, black residents worked mostly in low-level rural jobs. In the civil rights era, not one black resident was registered to vote before March 1, 1965.

When in 1956 NAACP was outlawed in Alabama, local activist John Hulett joined Alabama Christian Movement for Human Rights, a new organization founded by Fred Shuttlesworth. Following passage of the Civil Rights Act of 1964 and the Voting Rights Act of 1965, he joined the voter-registration drive of the Student Nonviolent Coordinating Committee (SNCC), becoming with John C. Larson, a preacher, the first African-Americans on the county's electoral rolls in more than six decades.

With the registration drive "swarmed" by young people, SNCC chairman Stokely Carmichael took the initiative to help form the Lowndes County Freedom Organization (LCFO), with Hulett, its first chair. The first independent black political party in the county since Reconstruction, the LCFO took as its symbol a rampant black panther, representing black "strength and dignity", which contrasted with the white rooster of the segregationist Alabama Democratic Party. (A year later, the example was followed by Bobby Seale and Huey Newton in framing the nationwide the Black Panther Party for Self Defense). The goal was to get enough black people to vote, and to stand as candidates for county office, so that they might be fully represented in local government and redirect services to black residents, 80 percent of whom lived below the poverty line.

The police continued to arrest protesters in the summer of 1965. A group of protesters were released from jail in the county seat of Hayneville on August 20, 1965. As four of them approached a small store, Thomas Coleman, an unpaid special deputy, ordered them away. When he aimed his shotgun at one of the young black women (Ruby Sales), Jonathan Myrick Daniels pushed her down and was shot, which immediately killed him. Coleman also shot Father Richard Morrisroe, a Catholic priest, in the back, then stopped. He was indicted for the murder of Daniels; and an all-white jury quickly acquitted him after his claim of self-defense, although both men were unarmed. Coleman had been appointed as special deputy by the county sheriff. In response to the violence, some LCFO organizers began to openly carry arms.

On May 3, 1966, over 900 registered black voters cast their ballots at the county seat in Hayneville as independent participants in the primary, with some driving over 25 miles to do so. One notable strategy the LCFO encouraged among black voters was to help other black voters if they needed assistance as a precaution against the fact that "the Lowndes County Freedom Organization knew that once a local white person got behind the curtain with a black person, that vote would be lost" (p. 111). Another was to encourage black voters to simply pull the lever to vote strictly for LCFO candidates; in other words, to "pull the lever for the Black Panther and go on home," as stated on a sign on Highway U.S. 80 between Montgomery and Selma.

Whites in Lowndes County reacted strongly against the LCFO. In retaliation for black sharecroppers engaging in civil rights work, white landowners evicted many of them from their rental houses and land plots. They used economic blackmail to make them both homeless and unemployed in a struggling economy. The SNCC and Lowndes County leaders worked to help these families stay together and remain in the county. They bought tents, cots, heaters, food, and water and helped several families build a temporary "tent city". Despite harassment, including shots regularly fired into the encampment, these black residents persevered for nearly two years as organizers helped them find new jobs and look for permanent housing.

Whites refused to serve known LCFO members in stores and restaurants. Several small riots broke out over the issue. The LCFO pushed forward and continued to organize and register voters. However, none of their candidates won in the November 1966 general election. In a December 1966 edition of The Liberator, a Black Power magazine, activist Gwendolyn Patton alleged the election had been subverted by widespread ballot fraud. But historians believe that black sharecroppers refrained from voting, submitting to the severe pressure put on them by the local white plantation owners, who employed most of them. After the LCFO folded into the statewide Democratic Party in 1970, African Americans have supported candidates who have won election to local offices. In a continuing divide, since the late 20th century, most white conservative voters in Alabama have shifted to the Republican Party.

In White v. Crook (1966), Federal District Judge Frank M. Johnson ruled in a class action suit brought on behalf of black residents of Lowndes County, who demonstrated they had been excluded from juries. Women of all races were excluded from juries by state statute. Johnson ordered that the state of Alabama must take action to recruit both male and female blacks to serve on juries, as well as other women, according to their rights under the Fourteenth Amendment. The suit was joined by other class members from other counties who dealt with similar conditions of exclusion from juries. It was "one of the first civil actions brought to remedy systematic exclusion of Negroes from jury service generally."

The LCFO continued to fight for wider political participation. Their goal of democratic, community control of politics spread into the wider civil rights movement. After merging with the state Democratic Party in 1970, LCFO candidates began winning public offices, Hulett becoming the first black sheriff in the county to be elected since Reconstruction.

Today an Interpretive Center in the county, maintained by the National Park Service, memorializes the Tent City and LCFO efforts in political organizing.

==== The "DEI" sewage controversy ====
In April 2025, the U.S. Justice Department terminated a landmark civil rights settlement with the State of Alabama to address serious health risks posed by the county's inadequate sanitation systems. The department claimed that the Biden-era agreement violated President Donald Trump’s proscription of DEI (diversity, equity and inclusion) initiatives.

The Alabama Department of Public Health said that it would continue working on remedial actions envisaged by the 2023 settlement "until appropriated funding expires”.

== Geography ==
According to the United States Census Bureau, the county has a total area of 725 square miles (1,880 km^{2}), of which 716 square miles (1,850 km^{2}) is land and 9.2 square miles (24 km^{2}) (1.3%) is water. The county is located in the Gulf Coastal Plain region of the state.

=== Major highways ===
- Interstate 65
- U.S. Highway 31 / State Route 3 (unsigned)
- U.S. Highway 80 / State Route 8 (unsigned)
- State Route 21
- State Route 97
- State Route 185
- State Route 263

=== Adjacent counties ===
- Autauga County (north)
- Montgomery County (east)
- Crenshaw County (southeast)
- Butler County (south)
- Wilcox County (southwest)
- Dallas County (west)

=== National protected area ===
- Selma to Montgomery National Historic Trail (part)

== Demographics ==
Historical population
| Census | Pop. | Note | %± |
|---|---|---|---|
| 1830 | 9,410 | | — |
| 1840 | 19,539 | | 107.6% |
| 1850 | 21,915 | | 12.2% |
| 1860 | 27,716 | | 26.5% |
| 1870 | 25,719 | | −7.2% |
| 1880 | 31,176 | | 21.2% |
| 1890 | 31,550 | | 1.2% |
| 1900 | 35,651 | | 13.0% |
| 1910 | 31,894 | | −10.5% |
| 1920 | 25,406 | | −20.3% |
| 1930 | 22,878 | | −10.0% |
| 1940 | 22,661 | | −0.9% |
| 1950 | 18,018 | | −20.5% |
| 1960 | 15,417 | | −14.4% |
| 1970 | 12,897 | | −16.3% |
| 1980 | 13,253 | | 2.8% |
| 1990 | 12,658 | | −4.5% |
| 2000 | 13,473 | | 6.4% |
| 2010 | 11,299 | | −16.1% |
| 2020 | 10,311 | | −8.7% |
| 2025 (est.) | 9,359 | ▼ | −9.2% |
U.S. Decennial Census; 1790–1960 1900–1990; 1990–2000 2010–2020

=== 2020 Census ===
Lowndes County, Alabama – Racial and ethnic composition Note: the US Census treats Hispanic/Latino as an ethnic category. This table excludes Latinos from the racial categories and assigns them to a separate category. Hispanics/Latinos may be of any race.
| Race / Ethnicity (NH = Non-Hispanic) | Pop 2000 | Pop 2010 | Pop 2020 | % 2000 | % 2010 | % 2020 |
|---|---|---|---|---|---|---|
| White alone (NH) | 3,464 | 2,841 | 2,807 | 25.71% | 25.14% | 27.3% |
| Black or African American alone (NH) | 9,841 | 8,283 | 7,149 | 73.04% | 73.31% | 69.8% |
| Native American or Alaska Native alone (NH) | 15 | 25 | 9 | 0.11% | 0.22% | 0.2% |
| Asian alone (NH) | 15 | 14 | 15 | 0.11% | 0.12% | 0.1% |
| Pacific Islander alone (NH) | 3 | 0 | 0 | 0.02% | 0.00% | 0.0% |
| Other race alone (NH) | 1 | 4 | 5 | 0.01% | 0.04% | 0.4% |
| Mixed race or Multiracial (NH) | 49 | 45 | 186 | 0.36% | 0.40% | 2.2% |
| Hispanic or Latino (any race) | 85 | 87 | 140 | 0.63% | 0.77% | 1.4% |
| Total | 13,473 | 11,299 | 10,311 | 100.00% | 100.00% | 100.00% |

As of the 2020 census, the county had a population of 10,311. The median age was 45.8 years. 19.7% of residents were under the age of 18 and 20.8% of residents were 65 years of age or older. For every 100 females there were 93.0 males, and for every 100 females age 18 and over there were 90.2 males age 18 and over.

The racial makeup of the county was 27.3% White, 69.8% Black or African American, 0.2% American Indian and Alaska Native, 0.1% Asian, 0.0% Native Hawaiian and Pacific Islander, 0.4% from some other race, and 2.2% from two or more races. Hispanic or Latino residents of any race comprised 1.4% of the population.

0.0% of residents lived in urban areas, while 100.0% lived in rural areas.

There were 4,272 households in the county, of which 27.2% had children under the age of 18 living with them and 37.7% had a female householder with no spouse or partner present. About 32.3% of all households were made up of individuals and 13.3% had someone living alone who was 65 years of age or older.

There were 4,779 housing units, of which 10.6% were vacant. Among occupied housing units, 76.0% were owner-occupied and 24.0% were renter-occupied. The homeowner vacancy rate was 0.6% and the rental vacancy rate was 8.3%.

=== 2010 census ===
As of the 2010 United States census, there were 11,299 people living in the county. In terms of ethnicity, 73.5% identified as Black or African American, 25.3% White, 0.2% Native American, 0.1% Asian, 0.3% of some other race and 0.5% of two or more races. 0.8% were Hispanic or Latino (of any race).

=== 2000 census ===
As of the census of 2000, there were 13,473 people, 4,909 households, and 3,588 families living in the county. The population density was 19 people per square mile (7.3 people/km^{2}). There were 5,801 housing units at an average density of 8 units per square mile (3.1 units/km^{2}). The racial makeup of the county was 73.37% Black or African American, 25.86% White, 0.11% Native American, 0.12% Asian, 0.02% Pacific Islander, 0.12% from other races, and 0.40% from two or more races. 0.63% of the population were Hispanic or Latino of any race.

According to the census of 2000, the largest ancestry groups claimed by residents in Lowndes County were African American 73.37%, English 20.14%, and Scots-Irish 3.1%.

There were 4,909 households, out of which 35.40% had children under the age of 18 living with them, 42.90% were married couples living together, 25.70% had a female householder with no husband present, and 26.90% were non-families. 24.60% of all households were made up of individuals, and 9.40% had someone living alone who was 65 years of age or older. The average household size was 2.73 and the average family size was 3.28.

In the county, the population was spread out, with 30.20% under the age of 18, 9.10% from 18 to 24, 27.10% from 25 to 44, 21.40% from 45 to 64, and 12.20% who were 65 years of age or older. The median age was 34 years. For every 100 females, there were 87.90 males. For every 100 females age 18 and over, there were 82.90 males.

The median income for a household in the county was $23,050, and the median income for a family was $28,935. Males had a median income of $27,694 versus $20,137 for females. The per capita income for the county was $12,457. About 26.60% of families and 31.40% of the population were below the poverty line, including 41.70% of those under age 18 and 26.60% of those age 65 or over.

== Government ==
Like all of the Black Belt, Lowndes County is powerfully Democratic. The only Republican to carry the county since 1900 was Barry Goldwater in 1964. In that year, most of the county's black majority was still prevented from voting. Opposition by the voting white minority to civil rights had resulted in the national Democratic candidate, Lyndon Johnson, being excluded from the ballot in the state.

Even after congressional passage of the Voting Rights Act of 1965, black registration was so slow that segregationist George Wallace comfortably carried the county in 1968. Since then, the Democratic presidential candidate has carried Lowndes in every election. In 1972, Lowndes was one of six former Wallace counties (Note: The others were the Alabama counties of Bullock and Wilcox, which similarly had delayed black registration after 1965; and the white-majority, historically secessionist Middle Tennessee trio of Houston, Perry and Stewart counties.) to vote for George McGovern in 1972 against Richard Nixon's 3,000-plus-county landslide.

As of 2014, Lowndes County has a five-member county commission, elected from single-member districts. The county sheriff is elected as well.

United States presidential election results for Lowndes County, Alabama
| Year | Republican | | Democratic | | Third party(ies) | |
| Year | No. | % | No. | % | No. | % |
|---|---|---|---|---|---|---|
| 1832 | 0 | 0.00% | 421 | 100.00% | 0 | 0.00% |
| 1836 | 870 | 73.36% | 316 | 26.64% | 0 | 0.00% |
| 1840 | 896 | 63.19% | 522 | 36.81% | 0 | 0.00% |
| 1844 | 710 | 51.15% | 678 | 48.85% | 0 | 0.00% |
| 1848 | 761 | 63.68% | 434 | 36.32% | 0 | 0.00% |
| 1852 | 126 | 24.32% | 186 | 35.91% | 206 | 39.77% |
| 1856 | 0 | 0.00% | 699 | 49.86% | 703 | 50.14% |
| 1860 | 0 | 0.00% | 57 | 3.44% | 1,599 | 96.56% |
| 1868 | 3,339 | 74.04% | 1,171 | 25.96% | 0 | 0.00% |
| 1872 | 3,959 | 81.39% | 905 | 18.61% | 0 | 0.00% |
| 1876 | 4,152 | 76.03% | 1,309 | 23.97% | 0 | 0.00% |
| 1880 | 2,399 | 62.92% | 1,414 | 37.08% | 0 | 0.00% |
| 1884 | 1,436 | 32.65% | 2,962 | 67.35% | 0 | 0.00% |
| 1888 | 1,468 | 41.09% | 2,105 | 58.91% | 0 | 0.00% |
| 1892 | 349 | 8.11% | 3,238 | 75.25% | 716 | 16.64% |
| 1896 | 642 | 17.40% | 3,001 | 81.35% | 46 | 1.25% |
| 1900 | 1,524 | 46.00% | 1,770 | 53.43% | 19 | 0.57% |
| 1904 | 32 | 4.37% | 697 | 95.22% | 3 | 0.41% |
| 1908 | 36 | 5.36% | 633 | 94.20% | 3 | 0.45% |
| 1912 | 4 | 0.67% | 583 | 97.00% | 14 | 2.33% |
| 1916 | 9 | 1.63% | 540 | 98.00% | 2 | 0.36% |
| 1920 | 6 | 0.82% | 727 | 99.18% | 0 | 0.00% |
| 1924 | 5 | 0.80% | 602 | 95.86% | 21 | 3.34% |
| 1928 | 180 | 20.39% | 703 | 79.61% | 0 | 0.00% |
| 1932 | 18 | 1.65% | 1,073 | 98.35% | 0 | 0.00% |
| 1936 | 10 | 0.82% | 1,205 | 99.01% | 2 | 0.16% |
| 1940 | 12 | 1.05% | 1,132 | 98.86% | 1 | 0.09% |
| 1944 | 16 | 1.95% | 802 | 97.92% | 1 | 0.12% |
| 1948 | 13 | 1.64% | 0 | 0.00% | 779 | 98.36% |
| 1952 | 631 | 43.73% | 809 | 56.06% | 3 | 0.21% |
| 1956 | 326 | 27.35% | 623 | 52.27% | 243 | 20.39% |
| 1960 | 432 | 34.84% | 796 | 64.19% | 12 | 0.97% |
| 1964 | 1,548 | 83.32% | 0 | 0.00% | 310 | 16.68% |
| 1968 | 234 | 7.17% | 1,127 | 34.54% | 1,902 | 58.29% |
| 1972 | 1,990 | 42.69% | 2,559 | 54.90% | 112 | 2.40% |
| 1976 | 1,621 | 29.68% | 3,732 | 68.33% | 109 | 2.00% |
| 1980 | 1,524 | 28.60% | 3,577 | 67.12% | 228 | 4.28% |
| 1984 | 1,629 | 31.02% | 3,567 | 67.92% | 56 | 1.07% |
| 1988 | 1,405 | 29.42% | 3,328 | 69.68% | 43 | 0.90% |
| 1992 | 1,328 | 25.80% | 3,500 | 67.99% | 320 | 6.22% |
| 1996 | 1,369 | 25.16% | 3,970 | 72.96% | 102 | 1.87% |
| 2000 | 1,638 | 26.24% | 4,557 | 72.99% | 48 | 0.77% |
| 2004 | 1,786 | 29.66% | 4,233 | 70.30% | 2 | 0.03% |
| 2008 | 1,809 | 24.86% | 5,449 | 74.87% | 20 | 0.27% |
| 2012 | 1,756 | 23.34% | 5,747 | 76.39% | 20 | 0.27% |
| 2016 | 1,751 | 26.20% | 4,883 | 73.06% | 50 | 0.75% |
| 2020 | 1,836 | 26.86% | 4,972 | 72.74% | 27 | 0.40% |
| 2024 | 1,758 | 31.09% | 3,867 | 68.38% | 30 | 0.53% |

United States Senate election results for Lowndes County, Alabama2
| Year | Republican | | Democratic | | Third party(ies) | |
| Year | No. | % | No. | % | No. | % |
|---|---|---|---|---|---|---|
| 2020 | 1,758 | 25.81% | 5,051 | 74.16% | 2 | 0.03% |

United States Senate election results for Lowndes County, Alabama3
| Year | Republican | | Democratic | | Third party(ies) | |
| Year | No. | % | No. | % | No. | % |
|---|---|---|---|---|---|---|
| 2022 | 1,277 | 31.37% | 2,734 | 67.16% | 60 | 1.47% |

Alabama Gubernatorial election results for Lowndes County
| Year | Republican | | Democratic | | Third party(ies) | |
| Year | No. | % | No. | % | No. | % |
|---|---|---|---|---|---|---|
| 2022 | 1,309 | 32.04% | 2,706 | 66.23% | 71 | 1.74% |

== Education ==
Lowndes County is served by Lowndes County Public Schools, which include:

- Calhoun High School
- Central Elementary School
- Central High School
- Fort Deposit Elementary School
- Hayneville Middle School
- Jackson-Steele Elementary School
- Lowndes County Middle School

== Health ==
A study published in the American Journal of Tropical Medicine and Hygiene in 2017 collected samples from 55 people in Lowndes County and found that 19 (34.5%) of studied samples tested positive for hookworm. The study concluded that the parasite burden was low. Hookworm infection is a soil-transmitted helminthiasis and classified as a neglected tropical disease associated with extreme poverty.

As of 2013, 23.5% of residents had diagnosed diabetes, the highest percentage of any county in the United States.

== Communities ==
=== Towns ===
- Benton
- Fort Deposit
- Gordonville
- Hayneville (county seat)
- Lowndesboro
- Mosses
- White Hall

=== Unincorporated communities ===
- Braggs
- Burkville
- Calhoun
- Collirene
- Letohatchee
- Mount Willing
- Sandy Ridge
- Trickem

== See also ==
- National Register of Historic Places listings in Lowndes County, Alabama
- Properties on the Alabama Register of Landmarks and Heritage in Lowndes County, Alabama
- Fort Deposit–Lowndes County Airport
- Battle of Holy Ground
- Calhoun Colored School
- Bates Turkey Farm
