= Davidson Faction =

- Founded: 1906 (as faction); 1908 (as party)
- Dissolved: 1908 (as party); 1910 (as faction)
- Split from: Alabama Republican Party
- Merged into: Alabama Republican Party

The Davidson Faction was a political party and Republican Party faction active in the U.S. state of Alabama from 1906 to 1910 as a faction, and 1908 as a party. The party split from the Alabama Republican Party to contest the 1908 elections.

== History ==
The Davidson faction was a political faction within the Alabama Republican Party that was opposed to the Thompson faction, led by chairman J. O. Thompson. The Davidson faction had initially nominated candidates in the 1906 elections, which were accepted by the Secretary of State as the official Republican candidates. The faction ended up nominating 13 candidates on the Republican Party ticket.

In 1908, Thompson led the initiative to expel all members of the Davidson faction from the Alabama Republican Party committee. The faction held a convention in May, and attempted to have their nominated candidates certified as the official Republican candidates, but the Thompson faction challenged this.

The issue was first brought to the Republican National Committee, which ruled in favor of the Thompson faction. A judge ruled that the party should appear on the ballot, though separate from the Republican Party and directed probate judges across the state to certify the Davidson Faction nominees. The party appeared on the ballot as the Davidson Faction, though the candidates were asked to support the regular Republican nominees. The emblem used was an arm and a hammer.

In 1910, the faction officially dissolved after announcing that they would support the regular Republican Party candidate slate.
