= 1876 United States presidential election in Alabama =

- November 7, 1876
- Turnout: 17.22% ▲0.22 pp
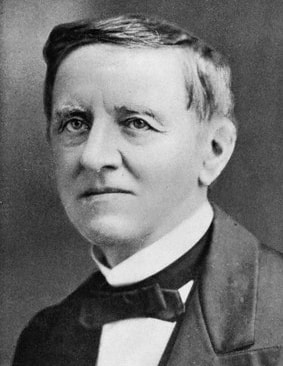

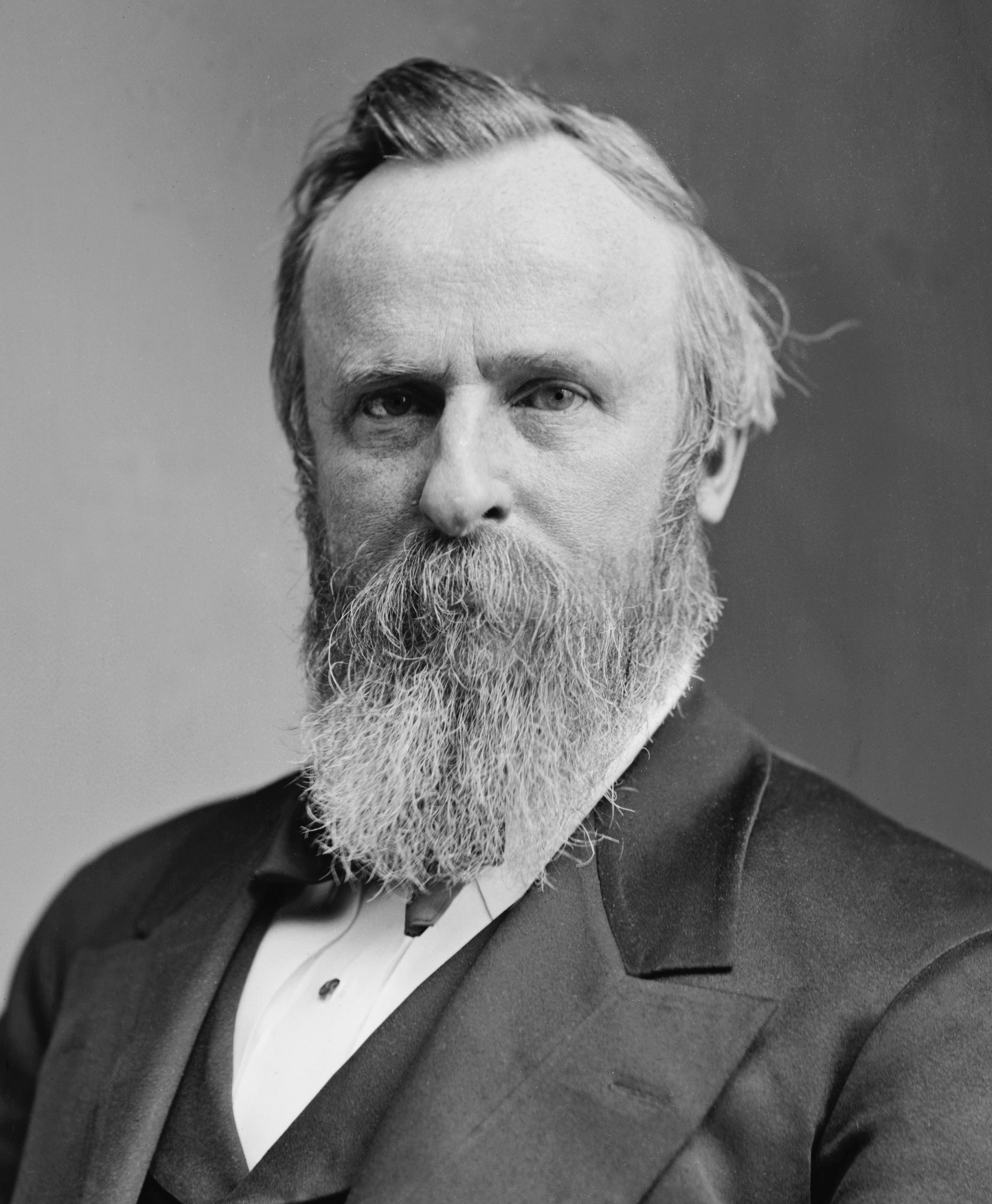
Nominee	Samuel J. Tilden	Rutherford B. Hayes
Party	Democratic	Republican
Home state	New York	Ohio
Running mate	Thomas A. Hendricks	William A. Wheeler
Electoral vote	10	0
Popular vote	102,989	68,708
Percentage	59.98%	40.02%
County results
Tilden
50–60%
60–70%
70–80%
80–90%
90–100%
Hayes
50–60%
60–70%
70–80%
President before election
Ulysses S. Grant
Republican
Elected President
Rutherford B. Hayes
Republican

The 1876 United States presidential election in Alabama took place on November 7, 1876, as part of the 1876 presidential election. State voters chose ten representatives, or electors, to the Electoral College, who voted for president and vice president.

Alabama was won by Samuel J. Tilden, the former governor of New York (D–New York), running with Thomas A. Hendricks, the governor of Indiana, with 59.98% of the popular vote, against Rutherford B. Hayes, the governor of Ohio (R-Ohio), running with Representative William A. Wheeler, with 40.02% of the vote. This was the first time since 1848 that Alabama backed the losing candidate in a presidential election with the primary opponent listed on the ballot. (Note: In 1856, John C. Frémont was not listed on the state ballot and only Buchanan and Fillmore were listed as candidates. Retroactively in 1860, Lincoln was not listed on the ballot and only Bell, Breckinridge, and Douglas were listed as candidates. Both Frémont and Lincoln were the Republican nominees)

== Results ==
1876 United States presidential election in Alabama
Party	Candidate	Votes	%
Democratic	Samuel J. Tilden	102,989	59.98%
Republican	Rutherford B. Hayes	68,708	40.02%
Write-in	Others	2	0.00%
Total votes		171,699	100%

=== Results By County ===
1876 United States Presidential Election in Alabama (By County)
County	Samuel J. Tilden Democratic		Rutherford B. Hayes Republican		Write-ins Other parties		Total
County	#	%	#	%	#	%	Total
Autauga	804	33.78%	1,576	66.22%	0	0.00%	2,380
Baldwin	789	54.38%	662	45.62%	0	0.00%	1,451
Barbour	3,594	95.69%	162	4.31%	0	0.00%	3,756
Bibb	890	72.77%	333	27.23%	0	0.00%	1,223
Blount	1,402	80.16%	347	19.84%	0	0.00%	1,749
Bullock	1,567	62.03%	959	37.97%	0	0.00%	2,526
Butler	1,956	66.06%	1,005	33.94%	0	0.00%	2,961
Calhoun	2,040	82.89%	421	17.11%	0	0.00%	2,461
Chambers	2,282	68.38%	1,053	31.56%	2	0.06%	3,337
Cherokee	1,666	85.04%	293	14.96%	0	0.00%	1,959
Chilton	728	82.82%	151	17.18%	0	0.00%	879
Choctaw	1,209	63.56%	693	36.44%	0	0.00%	1,902
Clarke	1,406	55.66%	1,120	44.34%	0	0.00%	2,526
Clay	1,188	86.46%	166	13.54%	0	0.00%	1,354
Cleburne	1,052	82.77%	219	17.23%	0	0.00%	1,271
Coffee	835	97.09%	25	2.91%	0	0.00%	860
Colbert	1,382	63.98%	778	36.02%	0	0.00%	2,160
Conecuh	1,169	60.07%	777	39.93%	0	0.00%	1,946
Coosa	1,347	64.76%	733	35.24%	0	0.00%	2,080
Covington	820	96.36%	31	3.64%	0	0.00%	851
Crenshaw	1,427	89.13%	174	10.87%	0	0.00%	1,601
Dale	1,143	80.95%	269	19.05%	0	0.00%	1,412
Dallas	1,609	29.05%	3,930	70.95%	0	0.00%	5,539
DeKalb	987	67.42%	447	32.58%	0	0.00%	1,434
Elmore	1,399	52.83%	1,249	47.17%	0	0.00%	2,648
Escambia	784	79.84%	198	20.16%	0	0.00%	982
Etowah	1,198	81.44%	273	18.56%	0	0.00%	1,471
Fayette	935	77.79%	267	22.21%	0	0.00%	1,202
Franklin	781	85.17%	136	14.83%	0	0.00%	917
Geneva	408	99.51%	2	0.49%	0	0.00%	410
Greene	1,055	28.20%	2,686	71.80%	0	0.00%	3,741
Hale	2,177	47.69%	2,388	52.31%	0	0.00%	4,565
Henry	1,587	78.53%	434	21.47%	0	0.00%	2,021
Jackson	2,689	79.49%	694	20.51%	0	0.00%	3,383
Jefferson	2,102	75.31%	689	24.69%	0	0.00%	2,791
Lamar	1,201	85.85%	198	14.15%	0	0.00%	1,399
Lauderdale	1,720	62.23%	1,044	37.77%	0	0.00%	2,764
Lawrence	1,659	52.78%	1,484	47.22%	0	0.00%	3,143
Lee	2,885	72.31%	1,105	27.69%	0	0.00%	3,990
Limestone	1,684	55.63%	1,343	44.37%	0	0.00%	3,027
Lowndes	1,309	23.97%	4,152	76.03%	0	0.00%	5,461
Macon	1,493	62.89%	881	37.11%	0	0.00%	2,374
Madison	3,423	55.21%	2,777	44.79%	0	0.00%	6,200
Marengo	2,755	58.16%	1,982	41.84%	0	0.00%	4,737
Marion	733	86.85%	111	13.15%	0	0.00%	844
Marshall	1,067	86.47%	167	13.53%	0	0.00%	1,234
Mobile	5,330	55.51%	4,272	44.49%	0	0.00%	9,602
Monroe	1,532	71.66%	606	28.34%	0	0.00%	2,138
Montgomery	2,381	27.56%	6,259	72.44%	0	0.00%	8,640
Morgan	1,432	64.94%	773	35.06%	0	0.00%	2,205
Perry	1,467	29.37%	3,528	70.63%	0	0.00%	4,995
Pickens	2,158	97.82%	48	2.18%	0	0.00%	2,206
Pike	2,111	81.98%	464	18.02%	0	0.00%	2,575
Randolph	1,179	57.68%	865	42.32%	0	0.00%	2,044
Russell	2,051	66.74%	1,022	33.26%	0	0.00%	3,073
Shelby	1,475	65.70%	770	34.30%	0	0.00%	2,245
St. Clair	1,134	72.28%	435	27.72%	0	0.00%	1,569
Sumter	2,234	61.99%	1,370	38.01%	0	0.00%	3,604
Talladega	2,014	60.61%	1,309	39.39%	0	0.00%	3,323
Tallapoosa	2,892	80.27%	711	19.73%	0	0.00%	3,603
Tuscaloosa	2,184	68.85%	988	31.15%	0	0.00%	3,172
Walker	799	61.27%	505	38.73%	0	0.00%	1,304
Washington	553	85.21%	96	14.79%	0	0.00%	649
Wilcox	1,490	29.28%	3,599	70.72%	0	0.00%	5,089
Winston	237	34.30%	454	65.70%	0	0.00%	691
Totals	102,989	59.98%	68,708	40.02%	2	0.00%	171,699

== See also ==
- United States presidential elections in Alabama
