= 1872 United States presidential election in Alabama =

- November 5, 1872
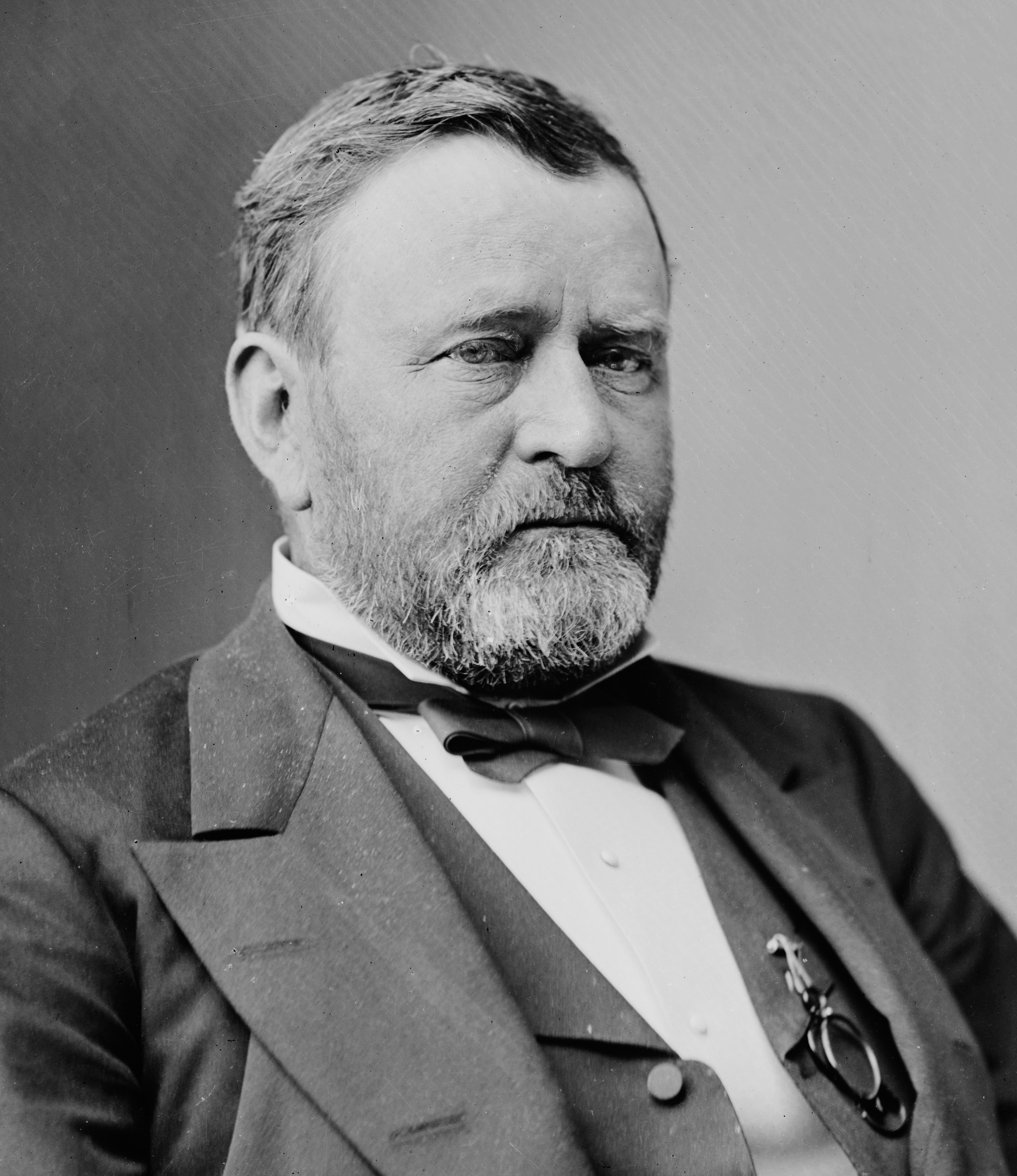

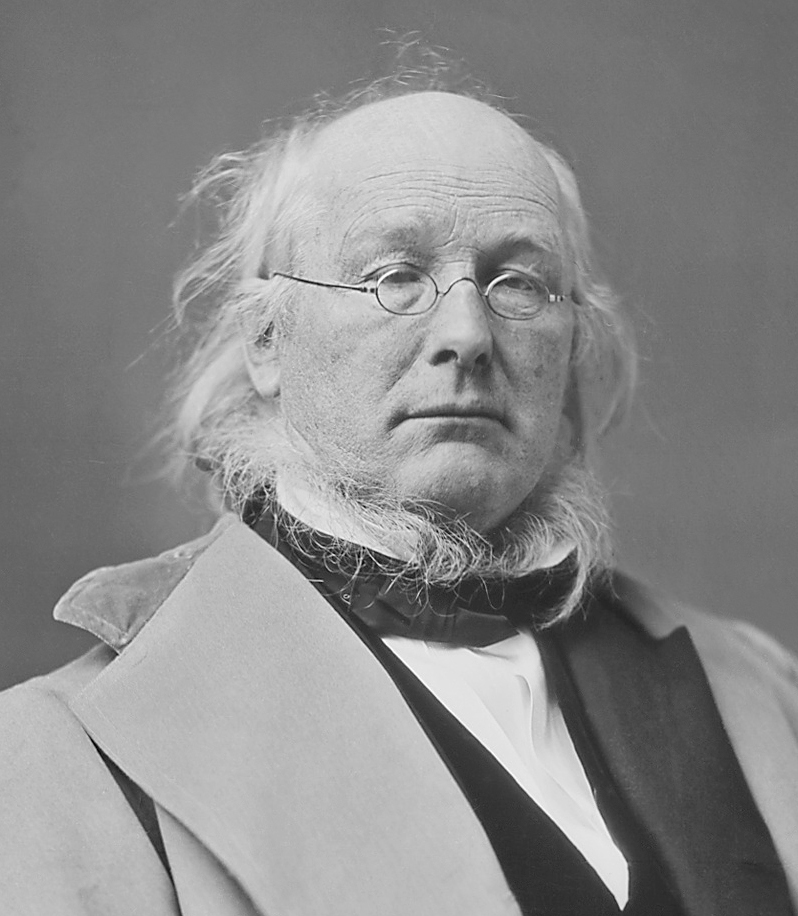
Nominee	Ulysses S. Grant	Horace Greeley
Party	Republican	Liberal Republican
Home state	Illinois	New York
Running mate	Henry Wilson	Benjamin G. Brown
Electoral vote	10	0
Popular vote	90,272	79,444
Percentage	53.19%	46.81%
County results
Grant
50–60%
60–70%
70–80%
80–90%
Greeley
50–60%
60–70%
70–80%
80–90%
President before election
Ulysses S. Grant
Republican
Elected President
Ulysses S. Grant
Republican

The 1872 United States presidential election in Alabama took place on November 5, 1872, as part of the 1872 United States presidential election. Voters chose ten representatives, or electors, to the Electoral College, who voted for president and vice president.

Alabama voted for the Republican candidate, Ulysses S. Grant, over Liberal Republican candidate Horace Greeley. Grant won the state by a margin of 6.38%.

This was the last time that Alabama voted for a Republican until Barry Goldwater won it in the 1964 presidential election. As of 2025, this is also the last time that a Republican won a majority of the vote in heavily black Macon County, home of Tuskegee Institute, which would become one of the most strongly Democratic counties in the nation in the late 20th and 21st centuries.

== Results ==
1872 United States presidential election in Alabama
Party	Candidate	Votes	%
Republican	Ulysses S. Grant	90,272	53.19%
Liberal Republican	Horace Greeley	79,444	46.81%
Total votes		169,716	100%

=== Results By County ===
1872 United States Presidential Election in Alabama (By County)
County	Ulysses S. Grant Republican		Horace Greeley Liberal Republican		Total votes cast
County	#	%	#	%	Total votes cast
Autauga	1,593	70.42%	669	29.58%	2,262
Baker	237	33.29%	475	66.71%	712
Baldwin	707	56.29%	549	43.71%	1,256
Barbour	2,756	54.29%	2,320	45.71%	5,076
Bibb	433	35.43%	789	64.57%	1,222
Blount	276	33.45%	549	66.55%	825
Bullock	3,101	71.68%	1,225	28.32%	4,326
Butler	1,101	42.53%	1,488	57.47%	2,589
Calhoun	400	18.48%	1,764	81.52%	2,164
Chambers	1,318	42.63%	1,774	57.37%	3,092
Cherokee	228	15.69%	1,225	84.31%	1,453
Choctaw	645	35.91%	1,151	64.09%	1,796
Clarke	1,095	43.08%	1,447	56.92%	2,542
Clay	401	30.04%	934	69.96%	1,335
Cleburne	416	44.83%	512	55.17%	928
Coffee	98	11.68%	741	88.32%	839
Colbert	856	45.95%	1,007	54.05%	1,863
Conecuh	951	51.32%	902	48.68%	1,853
Coosa	890	46.40%	1,028	53.60%	1,918
Covington	70	10.45%	600	89.55%	670
Crenshaw	309	23.27%	1,019	76.73%	1,328
Dale	322	24.16%	1,011	75.84%	1,333
Dallas	7,081	78.55%	1,934	21.45%	9,015
DeKalb	585	50.39%	576	49.61%	1,161
Elmore	1,564	54.44%	1,309	45.56%	2,873
Escambia	216	26.50%	599	73.50%	815
Etowah	288	28.92%	708	71.08%	996
Fayette	345	40.49%	507	59.51%	852
Franklin	425	48.79%	446	51.21%	871
Geneva	55	17.41%	261	82.59%	316
Greene	2,516	67.80%	1,195	32.20%	3,711
Hale	3,665	82.05%	802	17.95%	4,467
Henry	398	17.53%	1,873	82.47%	2,271
Jackson	675	29.51%	1,612	70.49%	2,287
Jefferson	1,053	46.65%	1,204	53.35%	2,257
Lauderdale	936	41.14%	1,339	58.86%	2,275
Lawrence	1,468	55.00%	1,201	44.00%	2,669
Lee	2,369	52.28%	2,162	47.72%	4,531
Limestone	893	51.95%	826	48.05%	1,719
Lowndes	3,959	81.39%	905	18.61%	4,864
Macon	2,073	68.62%	948	31.38%	3,021
Madison	2,991	54.81%	2,466	45.19%	5,457
Marengo	1,620	49.45%	1,656	50.55%	3,276
Marion	286	53.66%	247	46.34%	533
Marshall	298	32.68%	614	67.32%	912
Mobile	5,946	47.69%	6,522	52.31%	12,468
Monroe	481	25.05%	1,439	74.95%	1,920
Montgomery	7,096	70.43%	2,979	29.57%	10,075
Morgan	1,018	50.30%	1,006	49.70%	2,024
Perry	4,143	74.96%	1,384	25.04%	5,527
Pickens	446	23.38%	1,462	76.62%	1,908
Pike	553	23.10%	1,841	76.90%	2,394
Randolph	978	53.18%	861	46.82%	1,839
Russell	2,531	60.23%	1,671	39.77%	4,202
Sanford	278	32.36%	581	67.64%	859
Shelby	897	45.63%	1,069	54.37%	1,966
St. Clair	501	38.51%	800	61.49%	1,301
Sumter	2,491	60.15%	1,650	39.85%	4,141
Talladega	1,943	55.59%	1,552	44.41%	3,495
Tallapoosa	725	25.65%	2,101	74.35%	2,826
Tuscaloosa	1,363	45.22%	1,651	54.78%	3,014
Walker	450	51.72%	420	48.28%	870
Washington	79	13.76%	495	86.24%	574
Wilcox	3,958	75.77%	1,266	24.23%	5,224
Winston	433	80.48%	105	19.52%	538
Totals	90,272	53.19%	79,444	46.81%	169,716

== See also ==
- United States presidential elections in Alabama
