= 1888 United States presidential election in Alabama =

- November 6, 1888
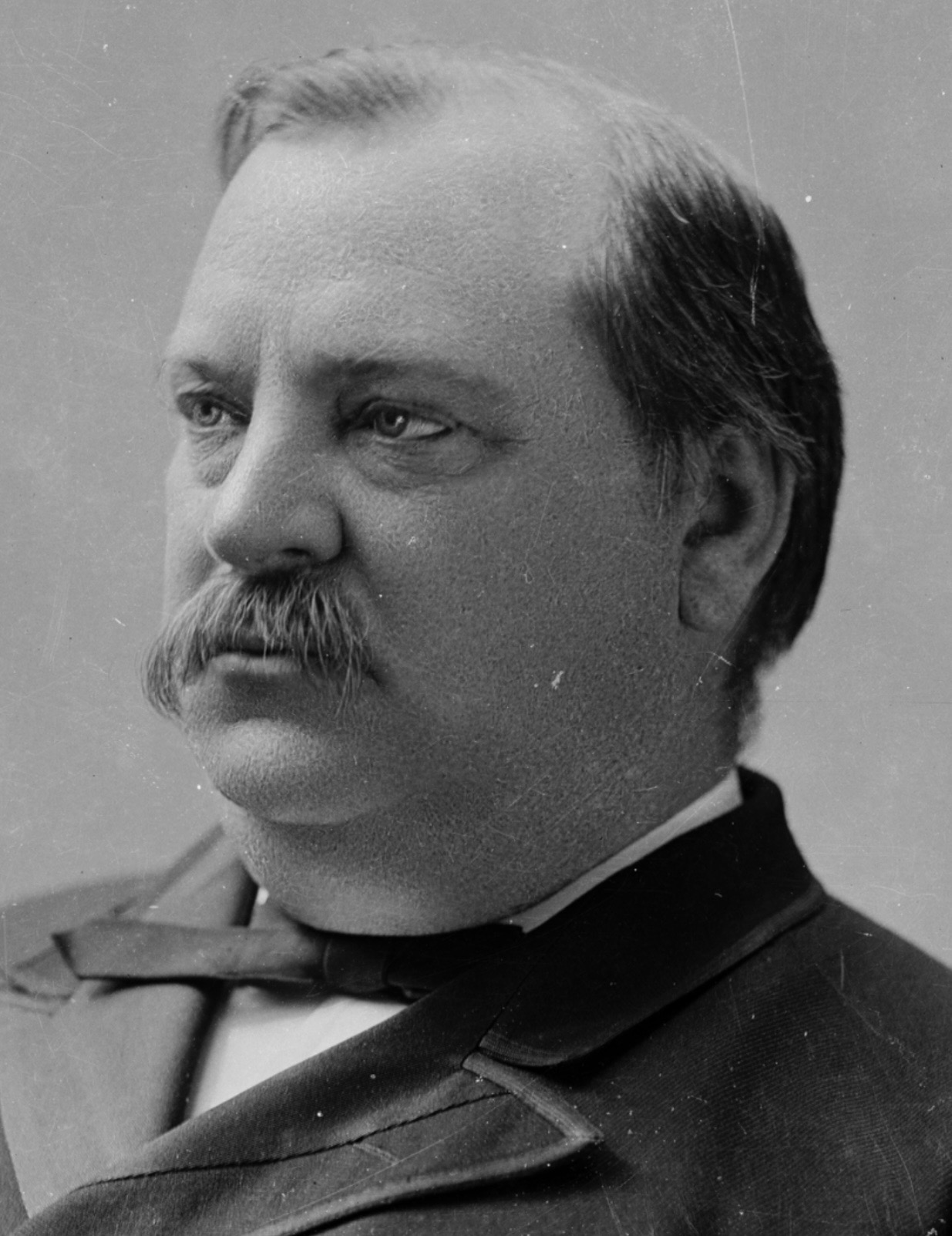

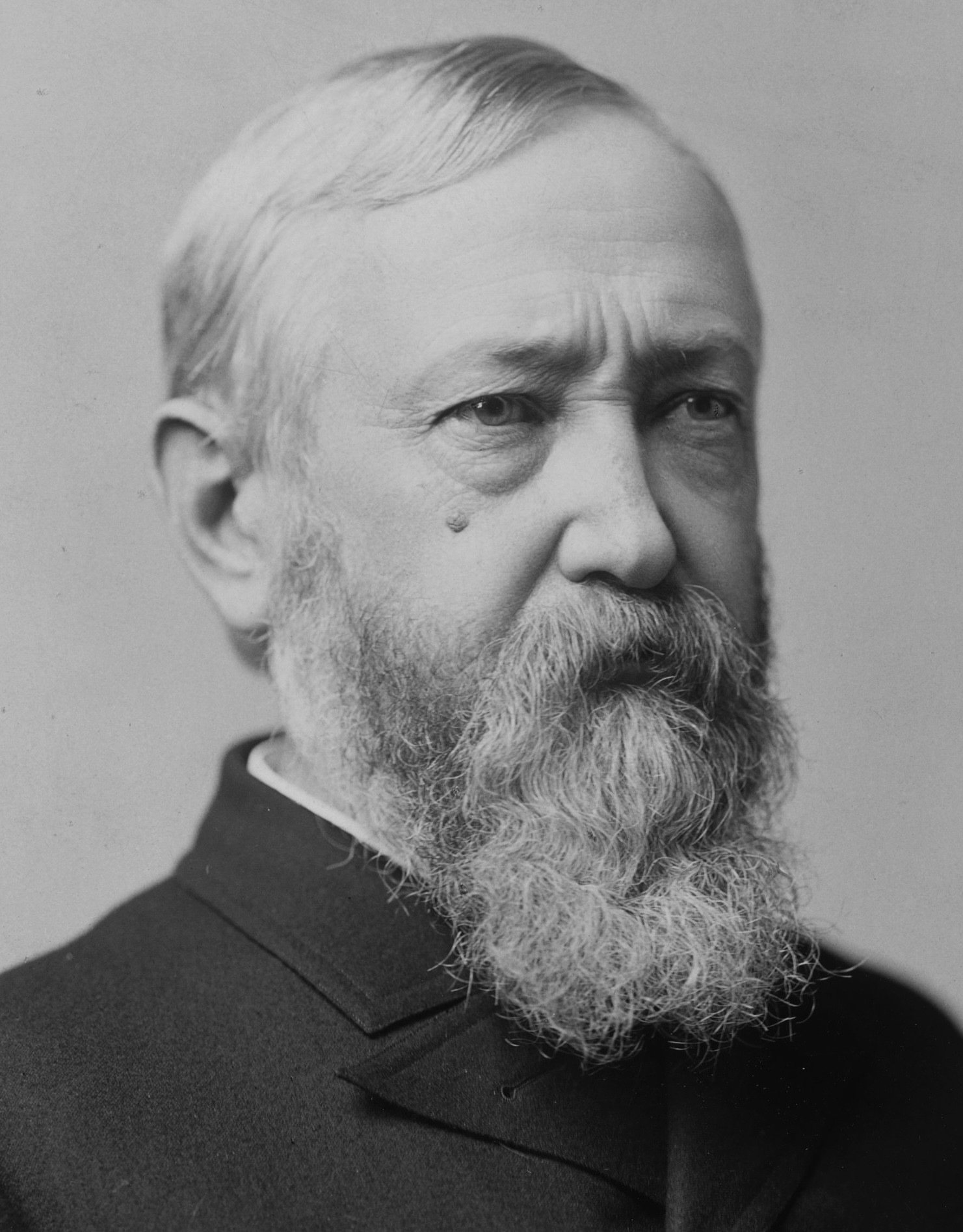
Nominee	Grover Cleveland	Benjamin Harrison
Party	Democratic	Republican
Home state	New York	Indiana
Running mate	Allen G. Thurman	Levi P. Morton
Electoral vote	10	0
Popular vote	117,314	57,177
Percentage	67.00%	32.66%
County results
Cleveland
50–60%
60–70%
70–80%
80–90%
90–100%
Harrison
40–50%
50–60%
President before election
Grover Cleveland
Democratic
Elected President
Benjamin Harrison
Republican

The 1888 United States presidential election in Alabama was held on November 6, 1888, as part of the concurrent Presidential election in which all thirty-eight contemporary states participated. Alabama voters chose ten electors, or representatives to the Electoral College, who voted for President and Vice-president.

Alabama was won easily by the Democratic nominee, former president and Governor of New York Grover Cleveland, over the Republican nominee, former Indiana Senator Benjamin Harrison. Increasing intimidation of African Americans who attempted to vote meant that Cleveland increased his margin of 22% in 1884 to 34.51%. Increasingly blatant electoral fraud in the region against the Republican Party – associated at this stage with the memories of Reconstruction – meant that Cleveland carried every Black Belt county, and lost only five counties in North Alabama that were unfavourable to his Bourbon Democrat policies and image.

== Results ==
1888 United States presidential election in Alabama
Party	Candidate	Votes	Percentage	Electoral votes
Democratic	Grover Cleveland (incumbent)	117,314	67.00%	10
Republican	Benjamin Harrison	57,177	32.66%	0
Prohibition	Clinton B. Fisk	594	0.34%	0
Totals		175,085	100.00%	10

=== Results by county ===
County	Grover Cleveland Democratic		Benjamin Harrison Republican		Clinton B. Fisk Prohibition		Various candidates Write-ins		Margin		Total votes cast
County	#	%	#	%	#	%	#	%	#	%	Total votes cast
Autauga	893	63.24%	519	36.76%	0	0.00%			374	26.49%	1,412
Baldwin	724	56.96%	547	43.04%	0	0.00%			177	13.93%	1,271
Barbour	3,530	88.65%	452	11.35%	0	0.00%			3,078	77.30%	3,982
Bibb	960	59.04%	657	40.41%	9	0.55%			303	18.63%	1,626
Blount	1,873	83.06%	375	16.63%	7	0.31%			1,498	66.43%	2,255
Bullock	716	60.63%	465	39.37%	0	0.00%			251	21.25%	1,181
Butler	1,905	58.13%	1,347	41.10%	25	0.76%			558	17.03%	3,277
Calhoun	2,680	73.87%	938	25.85%	10	0.28%			1,742	48.02%	3,628
Chambers	2,115	57.04%	1,593	42.96%	0	0.00%			522	14.08%	3,708
Cherokee	1,686	82.65%	333	16.32%	19	0.93%	2	0.10%	1,353	66.32%	2,040
Chilton	1,101	71.59%	437	28.41%	0	0.00%			664	43.17%	1,538
Choctaw	1,389	68.83%	629	31.17%	0	0.00%			760	37.66%	2,018
Clarke	1,566	55.91%	1,235	44.09%	0	0.00%			331	11.82%	2,801
Clay	1,278	77.08%	376	22.68%	4	0.24%			902	54.40%	1,658
Cleburne	940	77.24%	276	22.68%	1	0.08%			664	54.56%	1,217
Coffee	1,124	99.38%	7	0.62%	0	0.00%			1,117	98.76%	1,131
Colbert	1,274	49.08%	1,315	50.65%	7	0.27%			-41	-1.58%	2,596
Conecuh	1,347	64.30%	748	35.70%	0	0.00%			599	28.59%	2,095
Coosa	1,329	64.26%	739	35.74%	0	0.00%			590	28.53%	2,068
Covington	1,058	95.49%	50	4.51%	0	0.00%			1,008	90.97%	1,108
Crenshaw	1,923	90.71%	197	9.29%	0	0.00%			1,726	81.42%	2,120
Cullman	920	72.33%	350	27.52%	2	0.16%			570	44.81%	1,272
Dale	1,266	98.83%	15	1.17%	0	0.00%			1,251	97.66%	1,281
Dallas	5,302	71.69%	2,090	28.26%	4	0.05%			3,212	43.43%	7,396
DeKalb	1,326	68.49%	593	30.63%	17	0.88%			733	37.86%	1,936
Elmore	1,717	52.80%	1,535	47.20%	0	0.00%			182	5.60%	3,252
Escambia	694	58.47%	484	40.78%	9	0.76%			210	17.69%	1,187
Etowah	1,912	68.09%	841	29.95%	55	1.96%			1,071	38.14%	2,808
Fayette	864	72.85%	315	26.56%	7	0.59%			549	46.29%	1,186
Franklin	784	76.86%	236	23.14%	0	0.00%			548	53.73%	1,020
Geneva	794	99.37%	5	0.63%	0	0.00%			789	98.75%	799
Greene	1,401	64.24%	778	35.67%	2	0.09%			623	28.56%	2,181
Hale	2,914	66.23%	1,478	33.59%	8	0.18%			1,436	32.64%	4,400
Henry	1,947	99.85%	2	0.10%	1	0.05%			1,945	99.74%	1,950
Jackson	2,304	68.45%	1,022	30.36%	40	1.19%			1,282	38.09%	3,366
Jefferson	5,508	63.95%	3,001	34.84%	104	1.21%			2,507	29.11%	8,613
Lamar	1,133	82.28%	243	17.65%	1	0.07%			890	64.63%	1,377
Lauderdale	1,637	59.35%	1,120	40.61%	1	0.04%			517	18.75%	2,758
Lawrence	1,449	49.54%	1,457	49.81%	19	0.65%			-8	-0.27%	2,925
Lee	1,991	58.11%	1,432	41.80%	3	0.09%			559	16.32%	3,426
Limestone	1,489	55.29%	1,183	43.93%	21	0.78%			306	11.36%	2,693
Lowndes	2,105	58.91%	1,468	41.09%	0	0.00%			637	17.83%	3,573
Macon	931	77.65%	268	22.35%	0	0.00%			663	55.30%	1,199
Madison	2,136	45.08%	2,595	54.77%	6	0.13%	1	0.02%	-459	-9.69%	4,738
Marengo	3,426	63.93%	1,933	36.07%	0	0.00%			1,493	27.86%	5,359
Marion	721	72.54%	273	27.46%	0	0.00%			448	45.07%	994
Marshall	1,166	79.43%	248	16.89%	20	1.36%	34	2.32%	918	62.53%	1,468
Mobile	3,109	55.02%	2,542	44.98%	0	0.00%			567	10.03%	5,651
Monroe	1,445	65.33%	767	34.67%	0	0.00%			678	30.65%	2,212
Montgomery	3,712	55.58%	2,966	44.41%	1	0.01%			746	11.17%	6,679
Morgan	1,707	76.65%	507	22.77%	13	0.58%			1,200	53.88%	2,227
Perry	2,729	77.55%	790	22.45%	0	0.00%			1,939	55.10%	3,519
Pickens	1,326	98.66%	17	1.26%	1	0.07%			1,309	97.40%	1,344
Pike	2,623	74.67%	890	25.33%	0	0.00%			1,733	49.33%	3,513
Randolph	1,023	57.93%	733	41.51%	8	0.45%	2	0.11%	290	16.42%	1,766
Russell	1,970	64.42%	1,088	35.58%	0	0.00%			882	28.84%	3,058
Shelby	1,626	60.65%	1,037	38.68%	18	0.67%			589	21.97%	2,681
St. Clair	1,489	69.26%	640	29.77%	21	0.98%			849	39.49%	2,150
Sumter	2,060	71.28%	819	28.34%	11	0.38%			1,241	42.94%	2,890
Talladega	1,983	46.64%	2,179	51.25%	90	2.12%			-196	-4.61%	4,252
Tallapoosa	2,385	76.05%	751	23.95%	0	0.00%			1,634	52.10%	3,136
Tuscaloosa	2,214	67.09%	1,057	32.03%	28	0.85%	1	0.03%	1,157	35.06%	3,300
Walker	1,126	51.82%	1,047	48.18%	0	0.00%			79	3.64%	2,173
Washington	508	69.97%	217	29.89%	1	0.14%			291	40.08%	726
Wilcox	4,811	88.80%	607	11.20%	0	0.00%			4,204	77.59%	5,418
Winston	220	40.52%	323	59.48%	0	0.00%			-103	-18.97%	543
Totals	117,094	67.07%	56,854	32.57%	594	0.34%	40	0.02%	60,240	34.51%	174,582

== See also ==
- First presidency of Grover Cleveland
- Presidency of Benjamin Harrison
- United States presidential elections in Alabama
