= 1880 United States presidential election in Alabama =

- November 2, 1880
- Turnout: 12.03% of the total population ▼5.19 pp
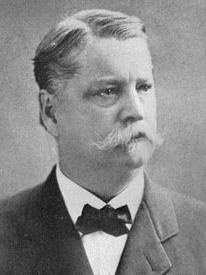

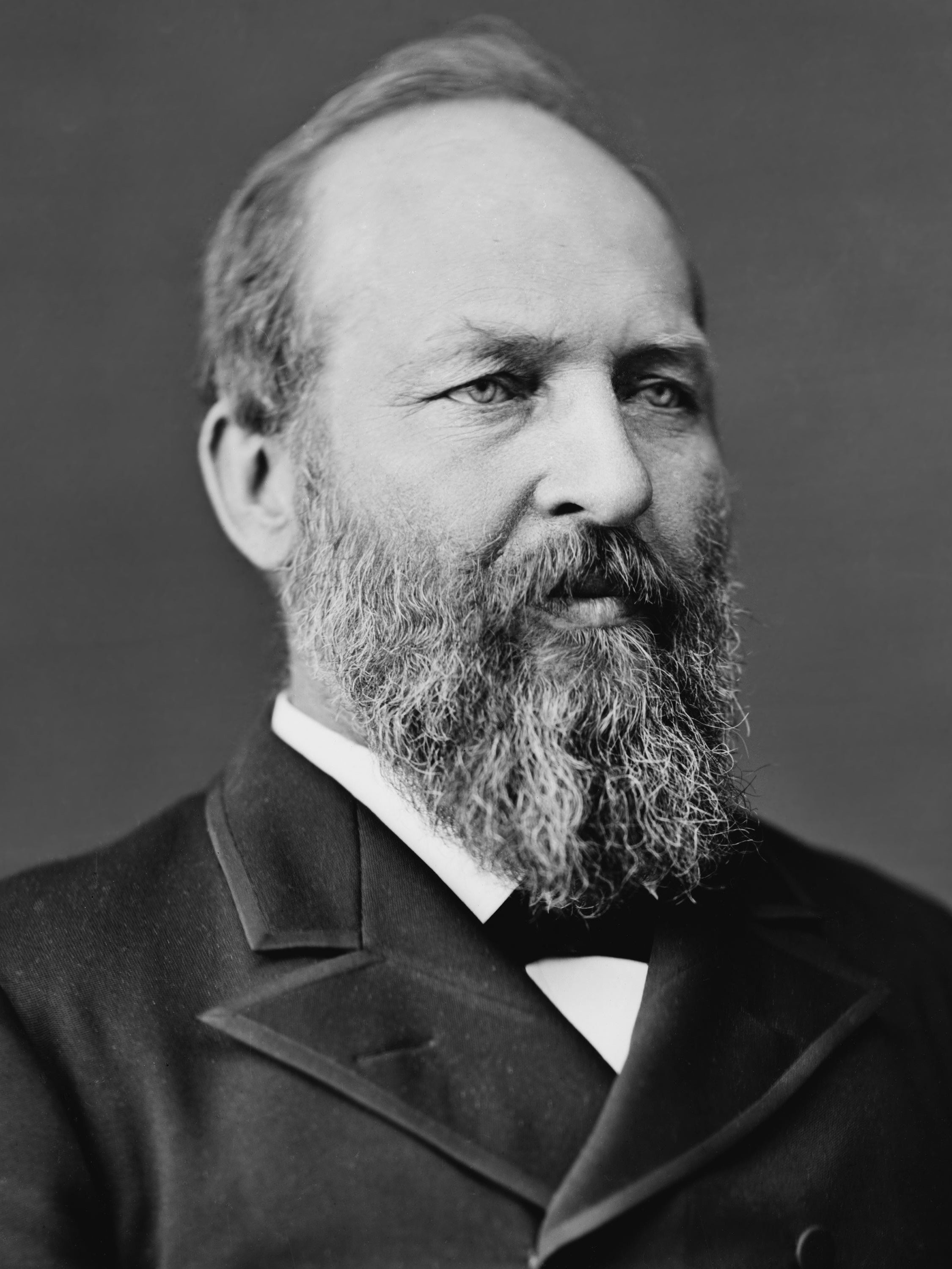
Nominee	Winfield Scott Hancock	James A. Garfield
Party	Democratic	Republican
Home state	Pennsylvania	Ohio
Running mate	William Hayden English	Chester A. Arthur
Electoral vote	10	0
Popular vote	91,130	56,350
Percentage	59.99%	37.10%
County results
Hancock
40–50%
50–60%
60–70%
70–80%
80–90%
90–100%
Garfield
40–50%
50–60%
60–70%
80–90%
President before election
Rutherford B. Hayes
Republican
Elected President
James A. Garfield
Republican

The 1880 United States presidential election in Alabama took place on November 2, 1880, as part of the nationwide presidential election. State voters chose ten representatives, or electors, to the Electoral College, who voted for president and vice president.

Alabama was won by General Winfield Scott Hancock (D–Pennsylvania), running with former Representative William Hayden English, with 59.99% of the popular vote, against Representative James A. Garfield (R-Ohio), running with the 10th chairman of the New York State Republican Executive Committee, Chester A. Arthur, with 37.10% of the vote.

== Results ==
1880 United States presidential election in Alabama
Party	Candidate	Votes	%
Democratic	Winfield Scott Hancock	91,130	59.99%
Republican	James A. Garfield	56,350	37.10%
Greenback	James B. Weaver	4,422	2.91%
Total votes		151,902	100%

=== Results By County ===
1880 United States Presidential Election (By County)
County	Winfield Scott Hancock Democratic		James A. Garfield Republican		James B. Weaver Greenback		Total votes cast
County	#	%	#	%	#	%	Total votes cast
Autauga	978	49.72%	974	49.52%	15	0.76%	1,967
Baldwin	767	52.79%	663	45.63%	23	1.58%	1,453
Barbour	2,753	69.63%	1,200	30.35%	1	0.03%	3,954
Bibb	737	87.43%	106	12.57%	0	0.00%	843
Blount	1,318	83.52%	260	16.48%	0	0.00%	1,578
Bullock	125	16.01%	656	83.99%	0	0.00%	781
Butler	2,026	70.13%	861	29.08%	2	0.07%	2,889
Calhoun	1,984	79.20%	509	20.32%	12	0.48%	2,505
Chambers	1,918	67.77%	884	31.24%	28	0.99%	2,830
Cherokee	1,390	88.54%	180	11.46%	0	0.00%	1,570
Chilton	713	84.48%	131	15.52%	0	0.00%	844
Choctaw	1,050	46.21%	520	20.89%	702	30.90%	2,272
Clarke	1,138	60.60%	740	39.40%	0	0.00%	1,878
Clay	1,002	81.60%	52	4.23%	174	14.17%	1,228
Cleburne	904	88.54%	117	11.46%	0	0.00%	1,021
Coffee	764	92.38%	63	7.62%	0	0.00%	827
Colbert	1,237	49.96%	1,072	43.30%	167	6.74%	2,476
Conecuh	1,154	57.79%	843	42.21%	0	0.00%	1,997
Coosa	1,296	61.07%	812	38.27%	14	0.66%	2,122
Covington	879	92.92%	64	6.77%	3	0.32%	946
Crenshaw	1,774	88.48%	231	11.52%	0	0.00%	2,005
Cullman	336	67.33%	163	32.67%	0	0.00%	499
Dale	1,224	81.17%	284	18.83%	0	0.00%	1,508
Dallas	1,794	61.82%	1,108	38.18%	0	0.00%	2,902
DeKalb	759	75.07%	252	24.93%	0	0.00%	1,011
Elmore	1,467	51.13%	1,389	48.41%	13	0.45%	2,869
Escambia	812	72.56%	285	25.47%	22	1.97%	1,119
Etowah	1,217	77.61%	347	22.13%	4	0.26%	1,568
Fayette	631	72.03%	202	23.06%	43	4.91%	876
Franklin	655	65.24%	239	23.80%	110	10.96%	1,004
Geneva	460	98.71%	6	1.29%	0	0.00%	466
Greene	943	39.19%	1,463	60.81%	0	0.00%	2,406
Hale	1,736	52.85%	1,549	47.15%	0	0.00%	3,285
Henry	1,729	86.36%	273	13.64%	0	0.00%	2,002
Jackson	2,059	56.97%	599	16.57%	956	26.45%	3,614
Jefferson	1,712	64.14%	781	29.26%	176	6.59%	2,669
Lamar	856	83.27%	172	16.73%	0	0.00%	1,028
Lauderdale	1,743	56.98%	1,228	40.14%	88	2.88%	3,059
Lawrence	1,555	44.09%	1,414	40.09%	558	15.82%	3,527
Lee	1,943	55.25%	1,569	44.61%	5	0.14%	3,517
Limestone	1,600	48.80%	1,623	49.50%	56	1.71%	3,279
Lowndes	1,414	37.08%	2,399	62.92%	0	0.00%	3,813
Macon	538	73.80%	191	26.20%	0	0.00%	729
Madison	2,808	44.16%	3,062	48.15%	489	7.69%	6,359
Marengo	2,359	56.38%	1,825	43.62%	0	0.00%	4,184
Marion	498	92.05%	43	7.95%	0	0.00%	541
Marshall	939	86.86%	83	7.68%	59	5.46%	1,081
Mobile	3,784	52.38%	3,239	44.84%	201	2.78%	7,224
Monroe	1,087	56.97%	821	43.03%	0	0.00%	1,908
Montgomery	2,971	34.04%	5,469	64.50%	39	0.46%	8,479
Morgan	1,420	60.71%	644	27.53%	275	11.76%	2,339
Perry	2,278	52.25%	2,082	47.75%	0	0.00%	4,360
Pickens	1,562	87.95%	214	12.05%	0	0.00%	1,776
Pike	2,327	75.77%	741	24.13%	3	0.10%	3,071
Randolph	832	63.13%	486	36.87%	0	0.00%	1,318
Russell	1,678	54.48%	1,402	45.52%	0	0.00%	3,080
Shelby	1,455	63.18%	840	36.47%	8	0.35%	2,303
St. Clair	942	65.51%	496	34.49%	0	0.00%	1,438
Sumter	1,787	57.20%	1,337	42.80%	0	0.00%	3,124
Talladega	1,659	47.70%	1,767	50.52%	62	1.78%	3,488
Tallapoosa	2,676	77.45%	779	22.55%	0	0.00%	3,455
Tuscaloosa	1,855	69.68%	807	30.32%	0	0.00%	2,662
Walker	539	66.38%	220	27.09%	53	6.53%	812
Washington	575	74.19%	139	17.94%	61	7.87%	775
Wilcox	1,860	59.54%	1,264	40.46%	0	0.00%	3,124
Winston	149	54.18%	126	45.82%	0	0.00%	275
Totals	91,130	59.99%	56,350	37.10%	4,422	2.91%	151,902

== See also ==
- United States presidential elections in Alabama
