= 1860 United States presidential election in Alabama =

- November 6, 1860
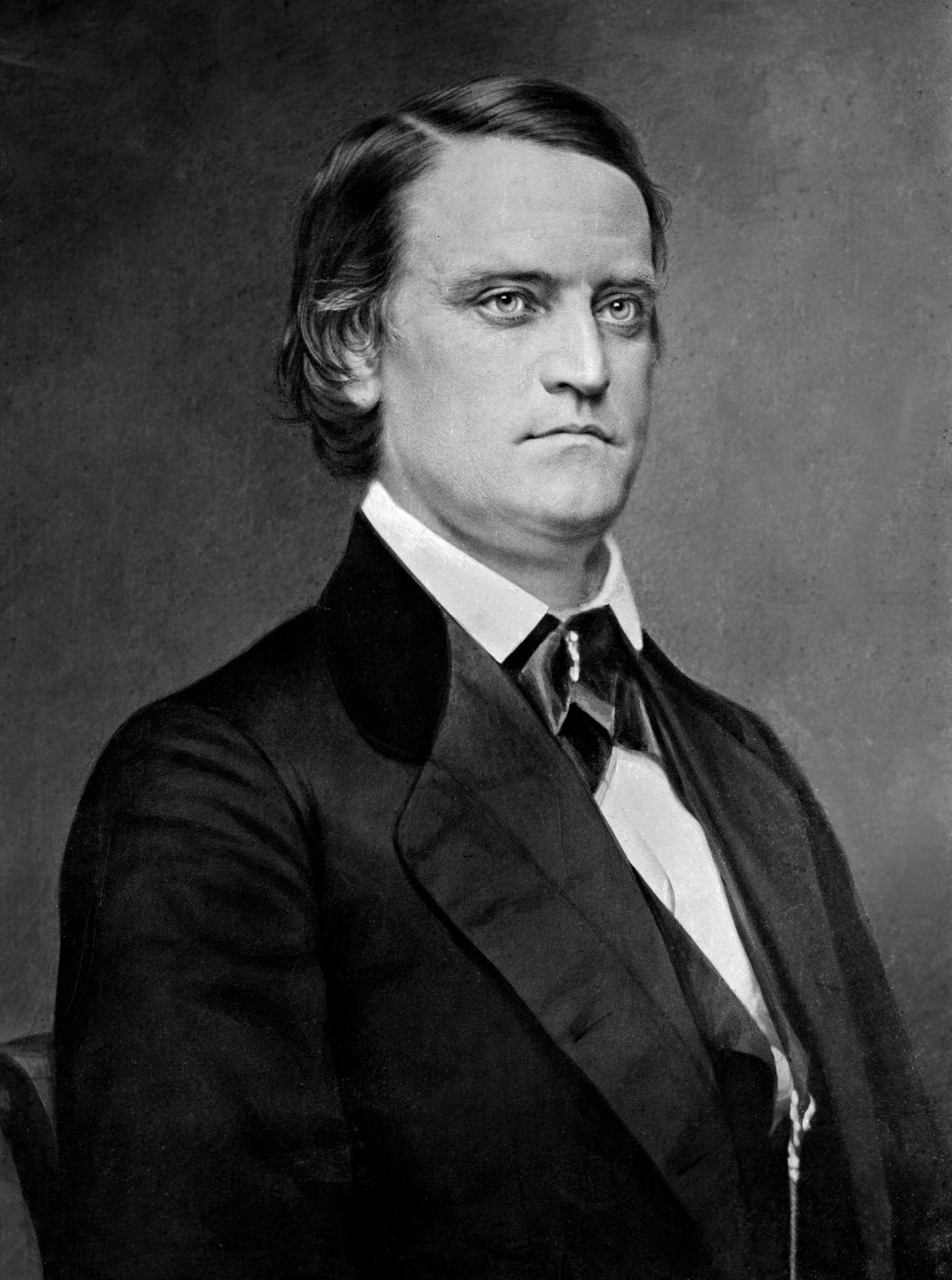

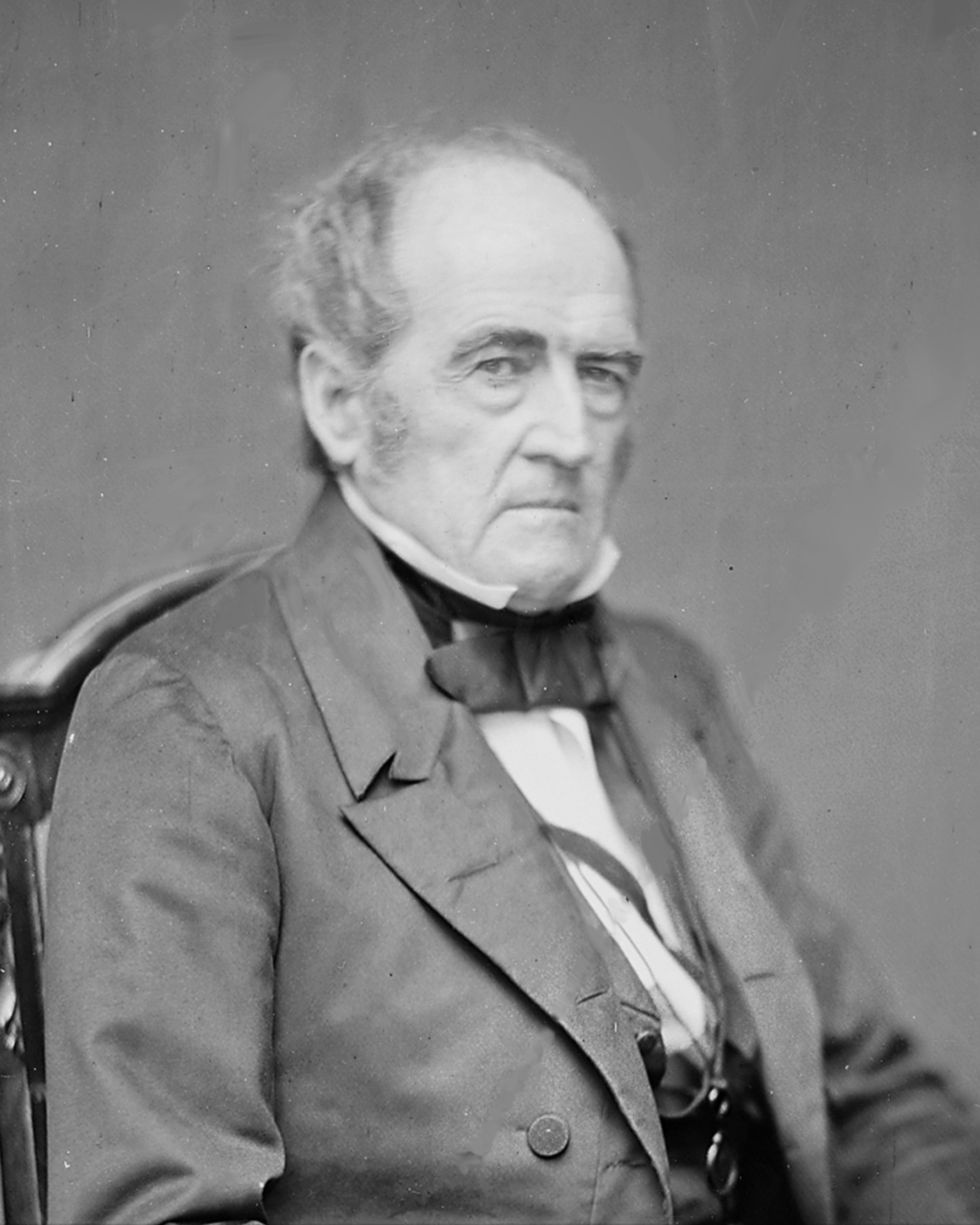

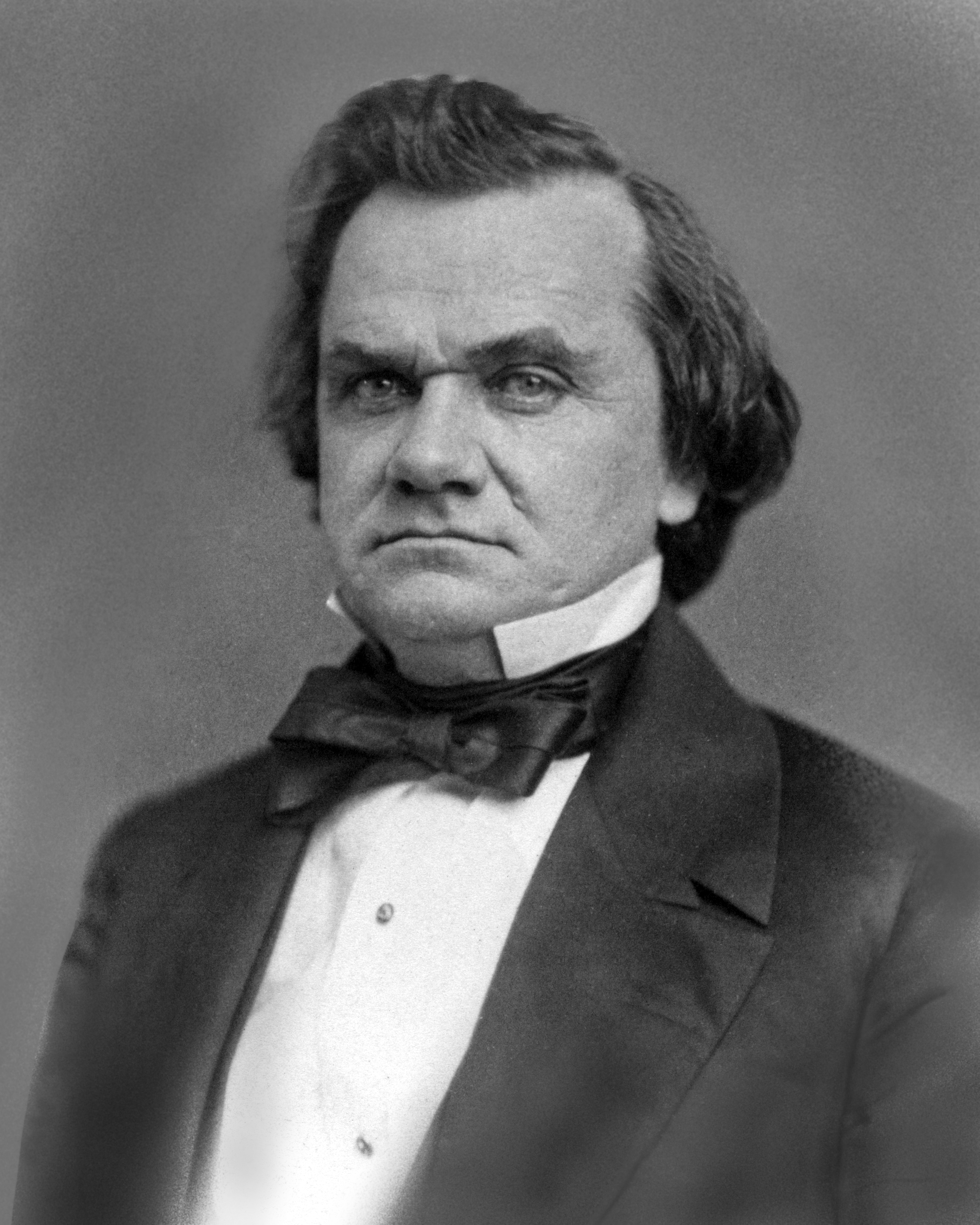
| Nominee | John C. Breckinridge | John Bell | Stephen A. Douglas |
| Party | Southern Democratic | Constitutional Union | Democratic |
| Home state | Kentucky | Tennessee | Illinois |
| Running mate | Joseph Lane | Edward Everett | Herschel V. Johnson |
| Electoral vote | 9 | 0 | 0 |
| Popular vote | 48,669 | 27,835 | 13,618 |
| Percentage | 54.00% | 30.89% | 15.11% |
County results
Breckinridge
30–40%
40–50%
50–60%
60–70%
70–80%
80–90%
Bell
40–50%
50–60%
Douglas
30–40%
40–50%
50–60%
President before election
James Buchanan
Democratic
Elected President
Abraham Lincoln
Republican

The 1860 United States presidential election in Alabama took place on November 6, 1860, as part of the 1860 United States presidential election. Alabama voters chose nine representatives, or electors, to the Electoral College, who voted for president and vice president.

Alabama was won by the Southern Democratic candidate 14th Vice President of the United States John C. Breckinridge of Kentucky and his running mate Senator Joseph Lane of Oregon. They defeated the Constitutional Union candidate Senator John Bell of Tennessee and his running mate Governor of Massachusetts Edward Everett as well as the Democratic candidate 15th Senator Stephen A. Douglas of Illinois) and his running mate 41st Governor of Georgia Herschel V. Johnson. Breckinridge would win the state by a margin of 23.11%.

The Republican Party and its candidate Abraham Lincoln did not have significant ballot distribution in the state.

== Results ==
1860 United States presidential election in Alabama
| Party | Candidate | Votes | % |
|---|---|---|---|
| Southern Democratic | John C. Breckinridge | 48,669 | 54.00% |
| Constitutional Union | John Bell | 27,835 | 30.89% |
| Democratic | Stephen A. Douglas | 13,618 | 15.11% |
| Total votes | | 90,122 | 100.00% |

=== Results by county ===
| County | John C. Breckinridge Southern Democratic | | John Bell Constitutional Union | | Stephen A. Douglas Democratic | | Margin | | Total votes cast |
| County | # | % | # | % | # | % | # | % | Total votes cast |
|---|---|---|---|---|---|---|---|---|---|
| Autauga | 611 | 48.53% | 256 | 20.33% | 392 | 31.14% | 219 | 17.39% | 1,259 |
| Baldwin | 129 | 28.17% | 248 | 54.15% | 81 | 17.69% | -119 | -25.98% | 458 |
| Barbour | 1,715 | 72.52% | 644 | 27.23% | 6 | 0.25% | 1,071 | 45.29% | 2,365 |
| Bibb | 613 | 45.41% | 582 | 43.11% | 155 | 11.48% | 31 | 2.30% | 1,350 |
| Blount | 698 | 55.80% | 65 | 5.20% | 488 | 39.01% | 210 | 16.79% | 1,251 |
| Butler | 918 | 43.55% | 1,079 | 51.19% | 111 | 5.27% | -161 | -7.64% | 2,108 |
| Calhoun | 2,347 | 84.88% | 364 | 13.16% | 54 | 1.95% | 1,983 | 71.72% | 2,765 |
| Chambers | 1,017 | 48.61% | 918 | 43.88% | 157 | 7.50% | 99 | 4.73% | 2,092 |
| Cherokee | 1,706 | 69.46% | 527 | 21.46% | 223 | 9.08% | 1,179 | 48.00% | 2,456 |
| Choctaw | 542 | 46.25% | 472 | 40.27% | 158 | 13.48% | 70 | 5.98% | 1,172 |
| Clarke | 952 | 74.14% | 255 | 19.86% | 77 | 6.00% | 697 | 54.28% | 1,284 |
| Coffee | 878 | 68.92% | 394 | 30.93% | 2 | 0.16% | 484 | 37.99% | 1,274 |
| Conecuh | 358 | 39.73% | 338 | 37.51% | 205 | 22.75% | 20 | 2.22% | 901 |
| Coosa | 930 | 37.50% | 706 | 28.47% | 844 | 34.03% | 86 | 3.47% | 2,480 |
| Covington | 404 | 48.56% | 416 | 50.00% | 12 | 1.44% | -12 | -1.44% | 832 |
| Dale | 1,280 | 81.95% | 277 | 17.73% | 5 | 0.32% | 1,003 | 64.22% | 1,562 |
| Dallas | 833 | 46.48% | 620 | 34.60% | 339 | 18.92% | 213 | 11.88% | 1,792 |
| DeKalb | 849 | 67.65% | 204 | 16.25% | 202 | 16.10% | 645 | 51.40% | 1,255 |
| Fayette | 1,299 | 76.64% | 359 | 21.18% | 37 | 2.18% | 940 | 55.46% | 1,695 |
| Franklin | 902 | 43.43% | 715 | 34.42% | 460 | 22.15% | 187 | 9.01% | 2,077 |
| Greene | 696 | 43.02% | 765 | 47.28% | 157 | 9.70% | -69 | -4.26% | 1,618 |
| Henry | 1,109 | 77.77% | 317 | 22.23% | 0 | 0.00% | 792 | 55.54% | 1,426 |
| Jackson | 1,760 | 71.69% | 130 | 5.30% | 565 | 23.01% | 1,195 | 48.68% | 2,455 |
| Jefferson | 831 | 72.07% | 245 | 21.25% | 77 | 6.68% | 586 | 50.82% | 1,153 |
| Lauderdale | 706 | 36.39% | 444 | 22.89% | 790 | 40.72% | -84 | -4.33% | 1,940 |
| Lawrence | 370 | 25.15% | 525 | 35.69% | 576 | 39.16% | -51 | -3.47% | 1,471 |
| Limestone | 522 | 42.96% | 368 | 30.29% | 325 | 26.75% | 154 | 12.67% | 1,215 |
| Lowndes | 1,007 | 60.81% | 592 | 35.75% | 57 | 3.44% | 415 | 25.06% | 1,656 |
| Macon | 1,184 | 48.52% | 1,210 | 49.59% | 46 | 1.89% | -26 | -1.07% | 2,440 |
| Madison | 591 | 25.80% | 400 | 17.46% | 1,300 | 56.74% | -709 | -30.94% | 2,291 |
| Marengo | 838 | 59.31% | 512 | 36.23% | 63 | 4.46% | 326 | 23.08% | 1,413 |
| Marion | 986 | 79.20% | 197 | 15.82% | 62 | 4.98% | 789 | 63.38% | 1,245 |
| Marshall | 441 | 32.21% | 165 | 12.05% | 763 | 55.73% | -322 | -23.52% | 1,369 |
| Mobile | 1,541 | 30.86% | 1,629 | 32.63% | 1,823 | 36.51% | -194 | -3.88% | 4,993 |
| Monroe | 530 | 44.20% | 447 | 37.28% | 222 | 18.52% | 83 | 6.92% | 1,199 |
| Montgomery | 1,555 | 57.13% | 1,034 | 37.99% | 133 | 4.89% | 521 | 19.14% | 2,722 |
| Morgan | 549 | 44.35% | 144 | 11.63% | 545 | 44.02% | 4 | 0.33% | 1,238 |
| Perry | 982 | 52.46% | 791 | 42.25% | 99 | 5.29% | 191 | 10.21% | 1,872 |
| Pickens | 1,211 | 65.60% | 619 | 33.53% | 16 | 0.87% | 592 | 32.07% | 1,846 |
| Pike | 1,581 | 54.67% | 1,227 | 42.43% | 84 | 2.90% | 354 | 12.24% | 2,892 |
| Randolph | 1,734 | 65.58% | 567 | 21.44% | 343 | 12.97% | 1,167 | 44.14% | 2,644 |
| Russell | 993 | 52.26% | 854 | 44.95% | 53 | 2.79% | 139 | 7.31% | 1,900 |
| St. Clair | 963 | 69.93% | 174 | 12.64% | 240 | 17.43% | 723 | 52.50% | 1,377 |
| Shelby | 853 | 53.01% | 570 | 35.43% | 186 | 11.56% | 283 | 17.58% | 1,609 |
| Sumter | 682 | 52.83% | 473 | 36.64% | 136 | 10.53% | 209 | 16.19% | 1,291 |
| Talladega | 1,307 | 52.87% | 1,091 | 44.13% | 74 | 2.99% | 216 | 8.74% | 2,472 |
| Tallapoosa | 1,451 | 48.06% | 1,270 | 42.07% | 298 | 9.87% | 181 | 5.99% | 3,019 |
| Tuscaloosa | 1,219 | 53.82% | 1,023 | 45.17% | 23 | 1.02% | 196 | 8.65% | 2,265 |
| Walker | 446 | 52.35% | 103 | 12.09% | 303 | 35.56% | 143 | 16.79% | 852 |
| Washington | 176 | 49.58% | 155 | 43.66% | 24 | 6.76% | 21 | 5.92% | 355 |
| Wilcox | 833 | 64.03% | 355 | 27.29% | 113 | 8.69% | 478 | 36.74% | 1,301 |
| Winston | 203 | 52.05% | 40 | 10.26% | 147 | 37.69% | 56 | 14.36% | 390 |
| Totals: | 48,669 | 54.00% | 27,835 | 30.89% | 13,618 | 15.11% | 20,834 | 23.11% | 90,122 |

==== Counties that flipped from Democratic to Southern Democratic ====
- Autauga
- Barbour
- Bibb
- Blount
- Calhoun
- Chambers
- Cherokee
- Choctaw
- Clarke
- Coffee
- Conecuh
- Coosa
- Dale
- Dallas
- DeKalb
- Fayette
- Franklin
- Henry
- Jackson
- Jefferson
- Limestone
- Lowndes
- Marengo
- Marion
- Monroe
- Montgomery
- Morgan
- Perry
- Pickens
- Pike
- Randolph
- Russell
- St. Clair
- Shelby
- Sumter
- Talladega
- Tallapoosa
- Tuscaloosa
- Walker
- Washington
- Wilcox
- Winston

==== Counties that flipped from Know Nothing to Southern Democratic ====
- Lowndes
- Montgomery
- Perry
- Tuscaloosa

==== Counties that flipped from Know Nothing to Constitutional Union ====
- Baldwin
- Butler
- Greene
- Macon

==== Counties that flipped from Democratic to Constitutional Union ====
- Covington

== See also ==
- United States presidential elections in Alabama
