= 1844 United States presidential election in Alabama =

- November 11, 1844

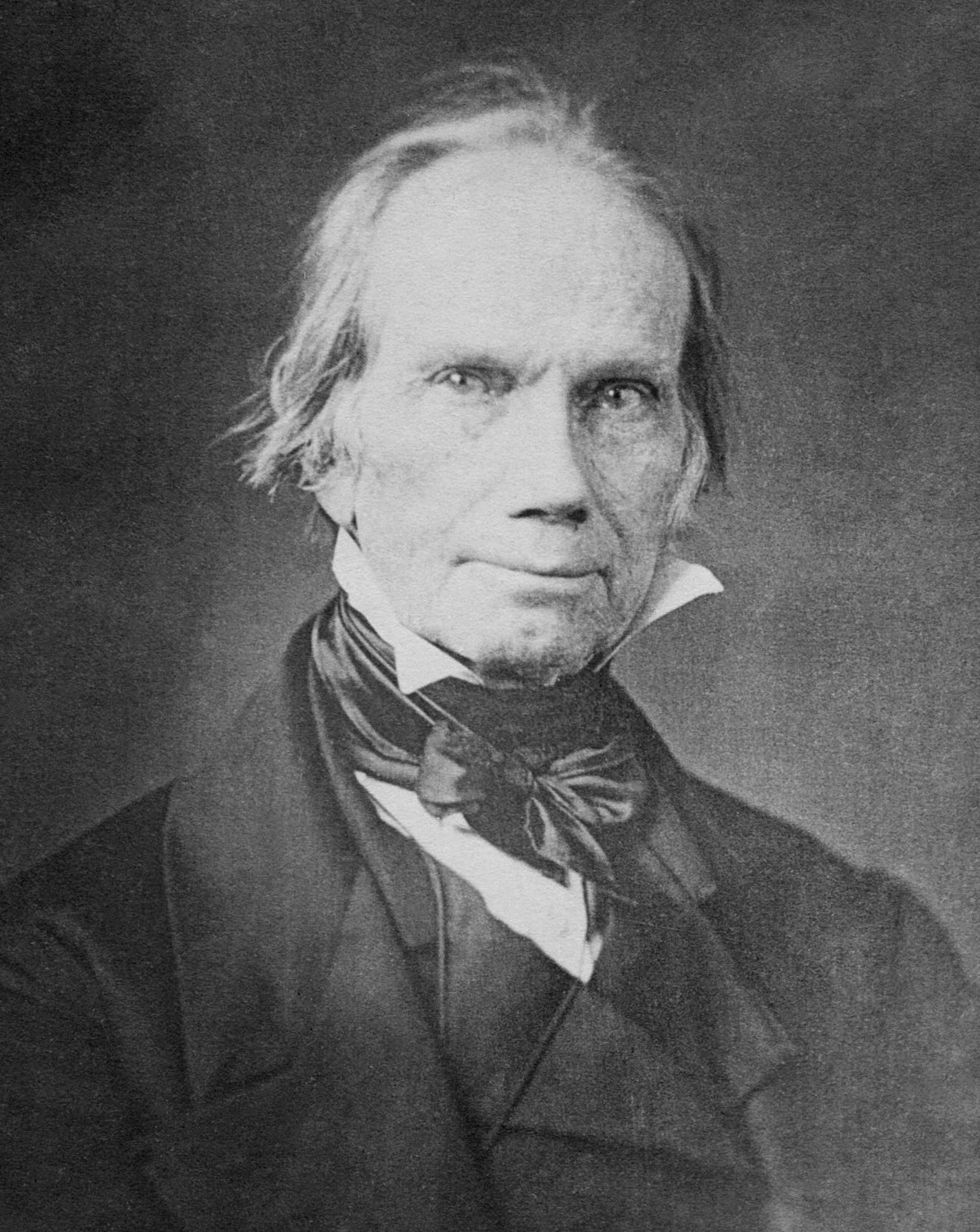
| Nominee | James K. Polk | Henry Clay |
| Party | Democratic | Whig |
| Home state | Tennessee | Kentucky |
| Running mate | George M. Dallas | Theodore Frelinghuysen |
| Electoral vote | 9 | 0 |
| Popular vote | 37,401 | 26,002 |
| Percentage | 58.99% | 41.01% |
County results
Polk
50–60%
60–70%
70–80%
80–90%
90–100%
Clay
50–60%
60–70%
President before election
John Tyler
Independent
Elected President
James K. Polk
Democratic

A presidential election was held in Alabama on November 11, 1844 as part of the 1844 United States presidential election. Voters chose nine representatives, or electors to the Electoral College, who voted for President and Vice President.

Alabama voted for the Democratic candidate, James K. Polk, over Whig candidate Henry Clay. Polk won Alabama by a margin of 17.98%.

== Results ==
1844 United States presidential election in Alabama
| Party | Candidate | Votes | % |
|---|---|---|---|
| Democratic | James K. Polk | 37,401 | 58.99% |
| Whig | Henry Clay | 26,002 | 41.01% |
| Total votes | | 63,403 | 100% |

=== Results by county ===
1844 United States Presidential Election in Alabama (by county)
| County | James K. Polk Democratic | | Henry Clay Whig | | Total votes cast |
| County | # | % | # | % | Total votes cast |
|---|---|---|---|---|---|
| Autauga | 633 | 57.13% | 475 | 42.87% | 1,108 |
| Baldwin | 120 | 44.61% | 149 | 55.39% | 269 |
| Barbour | 860 | 43.59% | 1,113 | 56.41% | 1,973 |
| Bibb | 1,382 | 78.75% | 373 | 21.25% | 1,755 |
| Benton | 596 | 56.98% | 450 | 43.02% | 1,046 |
| Blount | 774 | 90.21% | 84 | 9.79% | 858 |
| Butler | 405 | 37.82% | 666 | 62.18% | 1,071 |
| Chambers | 936 | 44.70% | 1,158 | 55.30% | 2,094 |
| Cherokee | 955 | 72.85% | 356 | 27.15% | 1,311 |
| Clarke | 631 | 73.12% | 232 | 26.88% | 863 |
| Coffee | 315 | 68.93% | 142 | 31.07% | 457 |
| Conecuh | 277 | 38.58% | 441 | 61.42% | 718 |
| Coosa | 796 | 66.56% | 400 | 33.44% | 1,196 |
| Covington | 139 | 48.43% | 148 | 51.57% | 287 |
| Dale | 616 | 74.67% | 209 | 25.33% | 825 |
| Dallas | 722 | 45.52% | 864 | 54.48% | 1,586 |
| DeKalb | 700 | 77.18% | 207 | 22.82% | 907 |
| Fayette | 796 | 83.88% | 153 | 16.12% | 949 |
| Franklin | 983 | 67.89% | 465 | 32.11% | 1,448 |
| Greene | 819 | 42.90% | 1,090 | 57.10% | 1,909 |
| Henry | 546 | 59.80% | 367 | 40.20% | 913 |
| Jackson | 1,751 | 95.27% | 87 | 4.73% | 1,838 |
| Jefferson | 585 | 68.90% | 264 | 31.10% | 849 |
| Lauderdale | 919 | 65.97% | 474 | 34.03% | 1,393 |
| Lawrence | 783 | 62.54% | 469 | 37.46% | 1,252 |
| Limestone | 965 | 74.81% | 325 | 25.19% | 1,290 |
| Lowndes | 678 | 48.85% | 710 | 51.15% | 1,388 |
| Macon | 626 | 36.54% | 1,087 | 63.46% | 1,713 |
| Madison | 1,720 | 82.81% | 357 | 17.19% | 2,077 |
| Marengo | 634 | 46.62% | 726 | 53.38% | 1,360 |
| Marion | 638 | 84.17% | 120 | 15.83% | 758 |
| Marshall | 875 | 84.38% | 162 | 15.62% | 1,037 |
| Mobile | 1,347 | 48.98% | 1,403 | 51.02% | 2,750 |
| Monroe | 359 | 38.77% | 567 | 61.23% | 926 |
| Montgomery | 836 | 45.14% | 1,016 | 54.86% | 1,852 |
| Morgan | 682 | 71.56% | 271 | 28.44% | 953 |
| Perry | 849 | 49.42% | 869 | 50.58% | 1,718 |
| Pickens | 967 | 52.02% | 892 | 47.98% | 1,859 |
| Pike | 768 | 47.12% | 862 | 52.88% | 1,630 |
| Randolph | 747 | 72.17% | 288 | 27.83% | 1,035 |
| Russell | 624 | 45.88% | 736 | 54.12% | 1,360 |
| Shelby | 472 | 48.02% | 511 | 51.98% | 983 |
| St. Clair | 644 | 93.33% | 46 | 6.67% | 690 |
| Sumter | 1,061 | 53.37% | 927 | 46.63% | 1,988 |
| Talladega | 851 | 57.35% | 633 | 42.65% | 1,484 |
| Tallapoosa | 705 | 49.20% | 728 | 50.80% | 1,433 |
| Tuscaloosa | 964 | 51.66% | 902 | 48.34% | 1,866 |
| Walker | 442 | 72.22% | 170 | 27.78% | 612 |
| Washington | 279 | 50.54% | 273 | 49.46% | 552 |
| Wilcox | 629 | 51.81% | 585 | 48.19% | 1,214 |
| Totals | 37,401 | 58.99% | 26,002 | 41.01% | 63,403 |

== See also ==
- United States presidential elections in Alabama
