= 1884 United States presidential election in Alabama =

- November 4, 1884
- Turnout: 12.03% of the total population ▲0.14 pp

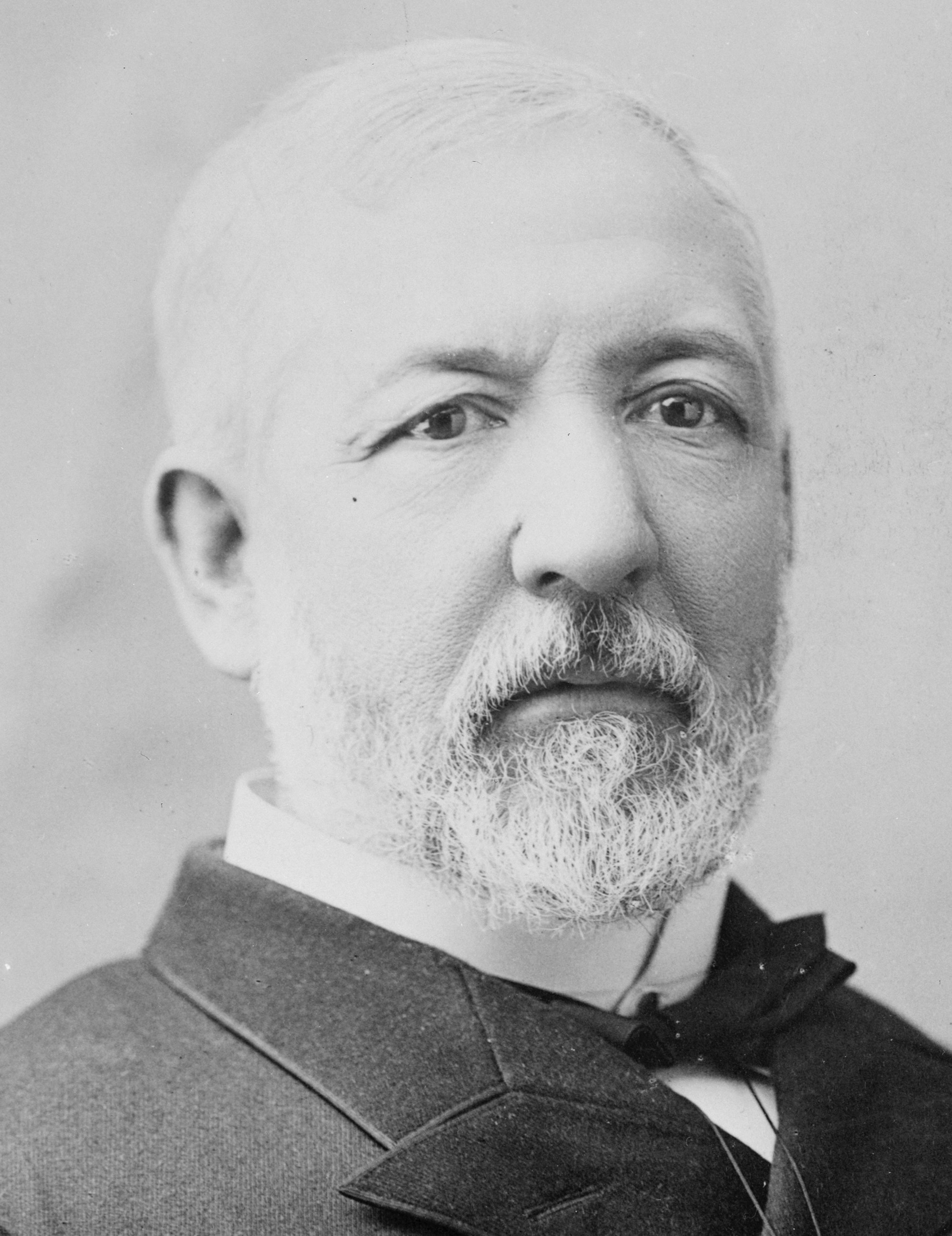
Nominee	Grover Cleveland	James G. Blaine
Party	Democratic	Republican
Home state	New York	Maine
Running mate	Thomas A. Hendricks	John A. Logan
Electoral vote	10	0
Popular vote	92,736	59,444
Percentage	60.37%	38.69%
County results
Cleveland
50–60%
60–70%
70–80%
80–90%
90–100%
Blaine
40–50%
50–60%
60–70%
President before election
James A. Garfield
Republican
Elected President
Grover Cleveland
Democratic

The 1884 United States presidential election in Alabama took place on November 4, 1884, as part of the nationwide presidential election. Alabama voters chose ten representatives, or electors, to the Electoral College, who voted for president and vice president.

Alabama was won by Grover Cleveland, the 28th governor of New York, (D–New York), running with the former governor of Indiana Thomas A. Hendricks, with 60.37% of the popular vote, against Secretary of State James G. Blaine (R-Maine), running with Senator John A. Logan, with 38.69% of the vote.

== Results ==
1884 United States presidential election in Alabama
Party	Candidate	Votes	%
Democratic	Grover Cleveland	92,736	60.37%
Republican	James G. Blaine	69,444	38.69%
Greenback	Benjamin Butler	762	0.50%
Prohibition	John St. John	610	0.40%
Write-in	Others	72	0.05%
Total votes		153,624	100%

=== Results By County ===
1884 United States Presidential Election in Alabama (By County)
County	Grover Cleveland Democratic		James G. Blaine Republican		Various candidates Other parties		Total votes cast
County	#	%	#	%	#	%	Total votes cast
Autauga	911	50.92%	877	9.02%	1	0.06%	1,789
Baldwin	776	52.15%	702	47.18%	10	0.67%	1,488
Barbour	2,122	75.09%	700	24.77%	4	0.14%	2,826
Bibb	622	69.03%	275	30.52%	4	0.44%	901
Blount	1,490	76.29%	463	23.71%	0	0.00%	1,953
Bullock	580	65.98%	296	33.67%	3	0.34%	879
Butler	1,724	60.85%	1,080	38.12%	29	1.02%	2,833
Calhoun	2,035	65.52%	1,066	34.32%	5	0.16%	3,106
Chambers	1,805	62.80%	1,069	37.20%	0	0.00%	2,874
Cherokee	1,397	76.59%	427	23.41%	0	0.00%	1,824
Chilton	841	74.03%	295	25.97%	0	0.00%	1,136
Choctaw	964	72.43%	367	27.57%	0	0.00%	1,331
Clarke	1,045	54.06%	888	45.94%	0	0.00%	1,933
Clay	1,147	80.72%	274	19.28%	0	0.00%	1,421
Cleburne	935	76.64%	285	23.36%	0	0.00%	1,220
Coffee	875	95.73%	39	4.27%	0	0.00%	914
Colbert	1,094	47.03%	1,200	51.59%	32	1.38%	2,326
Conecuh	1,036	51.57%	972	48.38%	1	0.05%	2,009
Coosa	1,361	62.32%	817	37.41%	6	0.27%	2,184
Covington	741	89.06%	89	10.70%	2	0.24%	832
Crenshaw	1,600	86.67%	246	13.33%	0	0.00%	1,846
Cullman	506	68.38%	232	31.35%	2	0.27%	740
Dale	980	81.94%	145	12.12%	71	5.94%	1,196
Dallas	3,026	59.87%	2,023	40.03%	5	0.10%	5,054
DeKalb	1,077	69.84%	465	30.16%	0	0.00%	1,542
Elmore	1,452	55.31%	1,141	43.47%	32	1.22%	2,625
Escambia	682	64.04%	367	34.46%	16	1.50%	1,065
Etowah	1,313	60.98%	813	37.76%	27	1.26%	2,153
Fayette	737	69.53%	322	30.38%	1	0.09%	1,060
Franklin	763	64.99%	368	31.35%	43	3.66%	1,174
Geneva	488	99.19%	0	0.00%	4	0.81%	492
Greene	625	32.40%	1,304	67.60%	0	0.00%	1,929
Hale	1,925	46.45%	2,203	53.16%	16	0.39%	4,144
Henry	1,653	89.25%	196	10.58%	3	0.16%	1,852
Jackson	2,217	61.40%	1,052	21.93%	342	9.47%	3,611
Jefferson	2,183	51.20%	2,018	47.33%	63	1.48%	4,264
Lamar	828	77.97%	234	22.03%	0	0.00%	1,062
Lauderdale	1,698	71.25%	629	26.40%	56	2.35%	2,383
Lawrence	1,407	44.88%	1,582	50.46%	146	4.66%	3,135
Lee	1,907	52.78%	1,680	46.50%	26	0.72%	3,612
Limestone	1,430	48.87%	1,450	49.56%	46	1.58%	2,926
Lowndes	2,962	67.35%	1,436	32.65%	0	0.00%	4,398
Macon	323	80.15%	80	19.85%	0	0.00%	403
Madison	2,800	46.17%	3,155	52.02%	110	1.82%	6,065
Marengo	2,457	61.73%	1,523	38.27%	0	0.00%	3,980
Marion	446	93.89%	25	5.26%	4	0.84%	475
Marshall	987	92.94%	73	6.87%	2	0.19%	1,062
Mobile	2,806	50.03%	2,787	49.69%	16	0.29%	5,609
Monroe	1,111	58.32%	794	41.68%	0	0.00%	1,905
Montgomery	2,587	33.06%	5,210	66.57%	29	0.37%	7,826
Morgan	1,573	60.45%	853	32.78%	176	6.77%	2,602
Perry	3,508	76.23%	1,079	23.45%	15	0.33%	4,602
Pickens	1,085	96.62%	31	2.76%	7	0.62%	1,123
Pike	2,494	75.53%	783	23.71%	25	0.76%	3,302
Randolph	949	52.99%	833	46.51%	9	0.50%	1,791
Russell	1,998	59.73%	1,347	40.27%	0	0.00%	3,345
Shelby	1,389	54.77%	1,123	44.28%	24	0.95%	2,536
St. Clair	901	57.32%	661	42.05%	10	0.64%	1,572
Sumter	1,525	61.15%	963	38.61%	6	0.24%	2,494
Talladega	1,278	41.55%	1,779	57.83%	19	0.62%	3,076
Tallapoosa	2,261	76.96%	675	22.97%	2	0.07%	2,938
Tuscaloosa	1,776	68.31%	807	31.04%	17	0.65%	2,600
Walker	670	50.53%	643	48.49%	13	0.98%	1,326
Washington	469	76.63%	143	23.37%	0	0.00%	612
Wilcox	2,429	61.18%	1,541	38.82%	0	0.00%	3,970
Winston	131	41.59%	184	58.41%	0	0.00%	315
Totals	92,736	60.37%	59,444	38.69%	1,444	0.95%	153,624

== See also ==
- United States presidential elections in Alabama
