= 1836 United States presidential election in Alabama =

- November 14, 1836
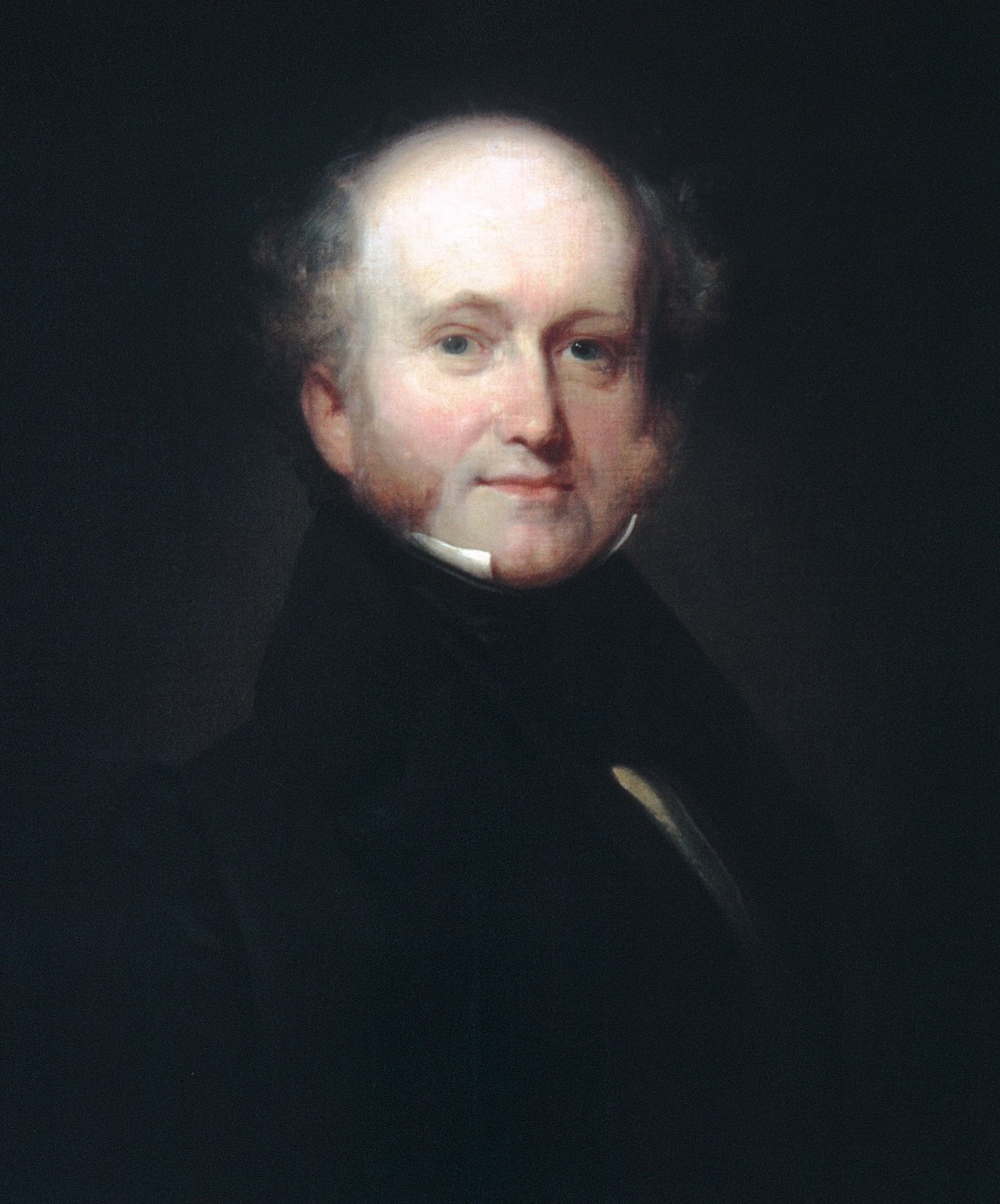

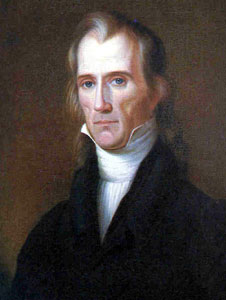
Nominee	Martin Van Buren	Hugh Lawson White
Party	Democratic	Whig
Home state	New York	Tennessee
Running mate	Richard Mentor Johnson	John Tyler
Electoral vote	7	0
Popular vote	20,638	16,658
Percentage	55.34%	44.66%
County results
Van Buren
50–60%
60–70%
70–80%
80–90%
90–100%
White
50–60%
60–70%
70–80%
80–90%
Unknown/No Vote
President before election
Andrew Jackson
Democratic
Elected President
Martin Van Buren
Democratic

A presidential election was held in Alabama on November 14, 1836, as part of the 1836 United States presidential election. Voters chose seven representatives, or electors, to the Electoral College, who voted for President and Vice President.

Alabama voted for the Democratic candidate, Martin Van Buren, over Whig candidate Hugh Lawson White. Van Buren won Alabama by a margin of 10.68%.

== Results ==
1836 United States presidential election in Alabama
Party	Candidate	Votes	Percentage	Electoral votes
Democratic	Martin Van Buren	20,638	55.34%	7
Whig	Hugh Lawson White	16,658	44.66%	0
Totals		37,296	100.00%	7

=== Results by county ===
County	Martin Van Buren Democratic		Hugh Lawson White Whig		Total votes cast
County	#	%	#	%	Total votes cast
Autauga	565	48.13%	609	51.87%	1,174
Baldwin	74	63.25%	43	36.75%	117
Barbour	291	47.63%	320	52.37%	611
Benton	637	68.94%	287	31.06%	924
Bibb	297	75.38%	97	24.62%	394
Blount	480	89.72%	55	10.28%	535
Butler	144	29.69%	341	70.31%	485
Cherokee	180	42.65%	242	57.35%	422
Clarke	386	72.97%	143	27.03%	529
Conecuh	88	23.59%	285	76.41%	373
Coosa	130	70.27%	55	29.73%	185
Covington	27	30.34%	62	69.66%	89
Dale	133	71.51%	53	28.49%	186
Dallas	456	33.24%	916	66.76%	1,372
DeKalb	378	90.00%	42	10.00%	420
Fayette	580	86.57%	90	13.43%	670
Franklin	593	59.90%	397	40.10%	990
Greene	672	37.65%	1,113	62.35%	1,785
Henry	131	52.61%	118	47.39%	249
Jackson	1,626	94.81%	89	5.19%	1,715
Jefferson	536	69.97%	230	30.03%	766
Lauderdale	917	68.84%	415	31.16%	1,332
Lawrence	600	51.55%	564	48.45%	1,164
Limestone	715	69.15%	319	30.85%	1,034
Lowndes	316	26.67%	869	73.33%	1,185
Macon	34	18.48%	150	81.52%	184
Madison	1,678	79.98%	420	20.02%	2,098
Marengo	422	44.66%	523	55.34%	945
Marion	299	67.80%	142	32.20%	441
Marshall	539	84.22%	101	15.78%	640
Mobile	866	53.96%	739	46.04%	1,605
Monroe	307	40.72%	447	59.28%	754
Montgomery	723	43.37%	944	56.63%	1,667
Morgan	568	54.46%	475	45.54%	1,043
Perry	290	25.96%	827	74.04%	1,117
Pickens	432	47.95%	469	52.05%	901
Pike	304	49.27%	313	50.73%	617
Randolph	56	46.28%	65	53.72%	121
Russell	40	20.62%	154	79.38%	194
Shelby	198	36.60%	343	63.40%	541
St. Clair	464	94.69%	26	5.31%	490
Sumter	631	44.44%	789	55.56%	1,420
Talladega	413	52.34%	376	47.66%	789
Tallapoosa	63	39.13%	98	60.87%	161
Tuscaloosa	841	53.53%	730	46.47%	1,571
Walker	110	59.14%	76	40.86%	186
Washington	166	64.84%	90	35.16%	256
Wilcox	242	28.50%	607	71.50%	849
Totals	21,231	55.45%	17,055	44.55%	38,286

== See also ==
- United States presidential elections in Alabama
