= United States presidential elections in Alabama =

Presidential elections in Alabama
- Number of elections: 51
- Voted Democratic: 29
- Voted Republican: 16
- Voted Democratic-Republican: 1
- Voted other: 2 (Note: George Wallace, 1968; Strom Thurmond, 1948.)
- Voted for winning candidate: 27
- Voted for losing candidate: 24

Following is a table of United States presidential elections in Alabama, ordered by year. Since its admission to statehood in 1819, Alabama has participated in every U.S. presidential election except the election of 1864, during the American Civil War, when the state had seceded to join the Confederacy.

A socially conservative Deep South state, Alabama was dominated by the Democratic Party for most of its history, voting almost exclusively Democratic from the founding of the party in the 1820s until the Civil Rights Movement in the 1960s. Since the election of 1980, the state has voted Republican, like most of the south.

Notably, Alabama has also almost always voted for the same presidential candidate as neighboring Mississippi. In more than two hundred years of presidential elections, they have supported the same candidate in all but one; the election of 1840, when Mississippi voted for William Henry Harrison and Alabama for Martin Van Buren (in 1868, only Alabama participated, as Mississippi had not yet been readmitted to the Union).

Winners of the state are in bold. The shading refers to the state winner, and not the national winner.

== Elections from 1864 to present ==
View source data.

Year	Winner (nationally)	Votes	Percent	Runner-up (nationally)	Votes	Percent	Other national candidates (Note: For purposes of these lists, other national candidates are defined as those who won at least one electoral vote, or won at least ten percent of the vote in multiple states.)	Votes	Percent	Electoral votes	Notes
2024	Donald Trump	1,462,616	64.57	Kamala Harris	772,412	34.10	–			9	
2020	Joe Biden	849,624	36.57	**Donald Trump**	1,441,170	62.03	—			9	
2016	**Donald Trump** (Note: Won the electoral college while losing the popular vote)	1,318,255	62.08	Hillary Clinton	729,547	34.36	—			9	
2012	Barack Obama	795,696	38.36	**Mitt Romney**	1,255,925	60.55	—			9	
2008	Barack Obama	813,479	38.74	**John McCain**	1,266,546	60.32	—			9	
2004	**George W. Bush**	1,176,394	62.46	John Kerry	693,933	36.84	—			9	
2000	**George W. Bush**	941,173	56.48	Al Gore	692,611	41.57	—			9	
1996	Bill Clinton	662,165	43.16	**Bob Dole**	769,044	50.12	Ross Perot	92,149	6.01	9	
1992	Bill Clinton	690,080	40.88	**George H. W. Bush**	804,283	47.65	Ross Perot	183,109	10.85	9	
1988	**George H. W. Bush**	815,576	59.17	Michael Dukakis	549,506	39.86	—			9	
1984	**Ronald Reagan**	872,849	60.54	Walter Mondale	551,899	38.28	—			9	
1980	**Ronald Reagan**	654,192	48.75	Jimmy Carter	636,730	47.45	John B. Anderson	16,481	1.23	9	
1976	**Jimmy Carter**	659,170	55.73	Gerald Ford	504,070	42.61	—			9	
1972	**Richard Nixon**	728,701	72.43	George McGovern	256,923	25.54	—			9	
1968	Richard Nixon	146,923	13.99	Hubert Humphrey	196,579	18.72	**George Wallace**	691,425	65.86	10	
1964	Lyndon B. Johnson	n/a	n/a	**Barry Goldwater**	479,085	69.45	Unpledged Democratic electors	210,732	30.55	10	Johnson did not appear on the ballot.
1960	**John F. Kennedy**	318,303	56.41	Richard Nixon	237,981	42.18	**Harry F. Byrd** (unpledged Democratic Electors)	324,050	57.43	11	Electoral votes split: five Kennedy and six unpledged (Byrd).
1956	Dwight D. Eisenhower	195,694	39.39	**Adlai Stevenson II**	280,844	56.52	T. Coleman Andrews/ Unpledged Electors (Note: Was allied with a slate of unpledged electors in Louisiana, Mississippi and South Carolina)	20,323	4.09	11	Electoral vote split: 11 to Stevenson, 1 to Jones (faithless elector)
1952	Dwight D. Eisenhower	149,231	35.02	**Adlai Stevenson II**	275,075	64.55	—			11	
1948	Harry S. Truman	n/a	n/a	Thomas E. Dewey	40,930	19.04	**Strom Thurmond**	171,443	79.75	11	Truman did not appear on the ballot.
1944	**Franklin D. Roosevelt**	198,918	81.28	Thomas E. Dewey	44,540	18.2	—			11	
1940	**Franklin D. Roosevelt**	250,726	85.22	Wendell Willkie	42,184	14.34	—			11	
1936	**Franklin D. Roosevelt**	238,136	86.38	Alf Landon	35,358	12.82	—			11	
1932	**Franklin D. Roosevelt**	207,910	84.74	Herbert Hoover	34,675	14.13	—			11	
1928	Herbert Hoover	120,725	48.49	**Al Smith**	127,797	51.33	—			12	
1924	Calvin Coolidge	45,005	27.01	**John W. Davis**	112,966	67.81	Robert M. La Follette	8,084	4.85	12	
1920	Warren G. Harding	74,556	31.37	**James M. Cox**	159,965	67.31	Parley P. Christensen	—	—	12	
1916	**Woodrow Wilson**	99,409	76.04	Charles E. Hughes	28,662	21.92	—			12	
1912	**Woodrow Wilson**	82,438	69.89	Theodore Roosevelt	22,680	19.23	William H. Taft	9,807	8.31	12	
1908	William H. Taft	25,561	24.31	**William Jennings Bryan**	74,391	70.75	—			11	
1904	Theodore Roosevelt	22,472	20.66	**Alton B. Parker**	79,797	73.35	—			11	
1900	William McKinley	55,612	34.82	**William Jennings Bryan**	97,129	60.82	—			11	
1896	William McKinley	55,673	28.61	**William Jennings Bryan**	130,298	66.96	—			11	
1892	**Grover Cleveland**	138,135	59.40	Benjamin Harrison	9,184	3.95	James B. Weaver	84,984	36.55	11	
1888	Benjamin Harrison	57,177	32.66	**Grover Cleveland**	117,314	67.00	—			10	
1884	**Grover Cleveland**	92,736	60.37	James G. Blaine	59,444	38.69	—			10	
1880	James A. Garfield	56,350	37.10	**Winfield S. Hancock**	91,130	59.99	James B. Weaver	4,422	2.91	10	
1876	Rutherford B. Hayes	68,708	40.02	**Samuel J. Tilden**	102,989	59.98	—			10	
1872	**Ulysses S. Grant**	90,272	53.19	Horace Greeley	79,444	46.81	—			10	
1868	**Ulysses S. Grant**	76,667	51.3	Horatio Seymour	72,921	48.7	—			8	
1864	Abraham Lincoln	n/a	n/a	George B. McClellan	n/a	n/a	—			n/a	No vote due to secession.

== Election of 1860 ==
The election of 1860 was a complex realigning election in which the breakdown of the previous two-party alignment culminated in four parties each competing for influence in different parts of the country. The result of the election, with the victory of an ardent opponent of slavery, spurred the secession of eleven states and brought about the American Civil War.

Year	Winner (nationally)	Votes	Percent	Runner-up (nationally)	Votes	Percent	Runner-up (nationally)	Votes	Percent	Runner-up (nationally)	Votes	Percent	Electoral votes
1860	Abraham Lincoln	no ballots	—	Stephen A. Douglas	13,618	15.1	**John C. Breckinridge**	48,669	54.0	John Bell	27,835	30.9	9

== Elections from 1828 to 1856 ==
Year	Winner (nationally)	Votes	Percent	Runner-up (nationally)	Votes	Percent	Other national candidates	Votes	Percent	Electoral votes	Notes
1856	**James Buchanan**	46,739	62.08	John C. Frémont	no ballots	—	Millard Fillmore	28,552	37.92	9	Frémont did not appear on the ballot
1852	**Franklin Pierce**	26,881	60.89	Winfield Scott	15,061	34.12	John P. Hale	—	—	9	
1848	Zachary Taylor	30,482	49.43	**Lewis Cass**	31,173	50.56	Martin Van Buren	—	—	9	
1844	**James K. Polk**	37,401	58.99	Henry Clay	26,002	41.01	—			9	
1840	William Henry Harrison	28,518	45.62	**Martin Van Buren**	33,996	54.38	—			7	
1836	**Martin Van Buren**	20,638	55.34	Hugh Lawson White	16,658	44.66	various (Note: Three other candidates ran and received electoral votes nationally as part of the unsuccessful Whig strategy to defeat Martin Van Buren by running four candidates with local appeal in different regions of the country. The others were William Henry Harrison, Daniel Webster, and Willie Person Mangum. None of these candidates appeared on the ballot in Alabama.)			7	
1832	**Andrew Jackson**	14,286	99.97	Henry Clay	5	0.03	William Wirt	—	—	7	
1828	**Andrew Jackson**	16,736	89.89	John Quincy Adams	1,878	10.09	—			5	

== Election of 1824 ==
The election of 1824 was a complex realigning election following the collapse of the prevailing Democratic-Republican Party, resulting in four different candidates each claiming to carry the banner of the party, and competing for influence in different parts of the country. The election was the only one in history to be decided by the House of Representatives under the provisions of the Twelfth Amendment to the United States Constitution after no candidate secured a majority of the electoral vote. It was also the only presidential election in which the candidate who received a plurality of electoral votes (Andrew Jackson) did not become president, a source of great bitterness for Jackson and his supporters, who proclaimed the election of Adams a corrupt bargain.

Year	Winner (nationally)	Votes	Percent	Runner-up (nationally)	Votes	Percent	Runner-up (nationally)	Votes	Percent	Runner-up (nationally)	Votes	Percent	Electoral votes
1824	**Andrew Jackson**	9,429	69.32	John Quincy Adams	2,422	17.80	Henry Clay	96	0.71	William H. Crawford	1,656	12.17	5

== Election of 1820 ==
In the election of 1820, incumbent President James Monroe ran effectively unopposed, winning all electoral votes (including Alabama's three electoral votes) except one vote in New Hampshire. The popular vote was primarily directed to filling the office of vice president. Alabama had its electors chosen not by the people, but by the State House and Senate. George W. Philips, Henry Minor and John Scott were selected by the legislature and all three men voted for James Monroe.

1820 United States presidential election in Alabama
Party	Candidate	Votes	Percentage	Electoral votes
**Democratic-Republican**	**George W. Philips**	**63**	**29.72%**	**1**
Democratic-Republican	**Henry Minor**	**62**	**29.25%**	**1**
Democratic-Republican	**John Scott**	**56**	**26.42%**	**1**
Democratic-Republican	James S. Walker	31	14.62%	0
**Totals**		**212**	**100.00%**	**3**

== See also ==
- Elections in Alabama
- List of United States Senate elections in Alabama
