= 1820 United States presidential election in Alabama =

- November 1 – December 6, 1820
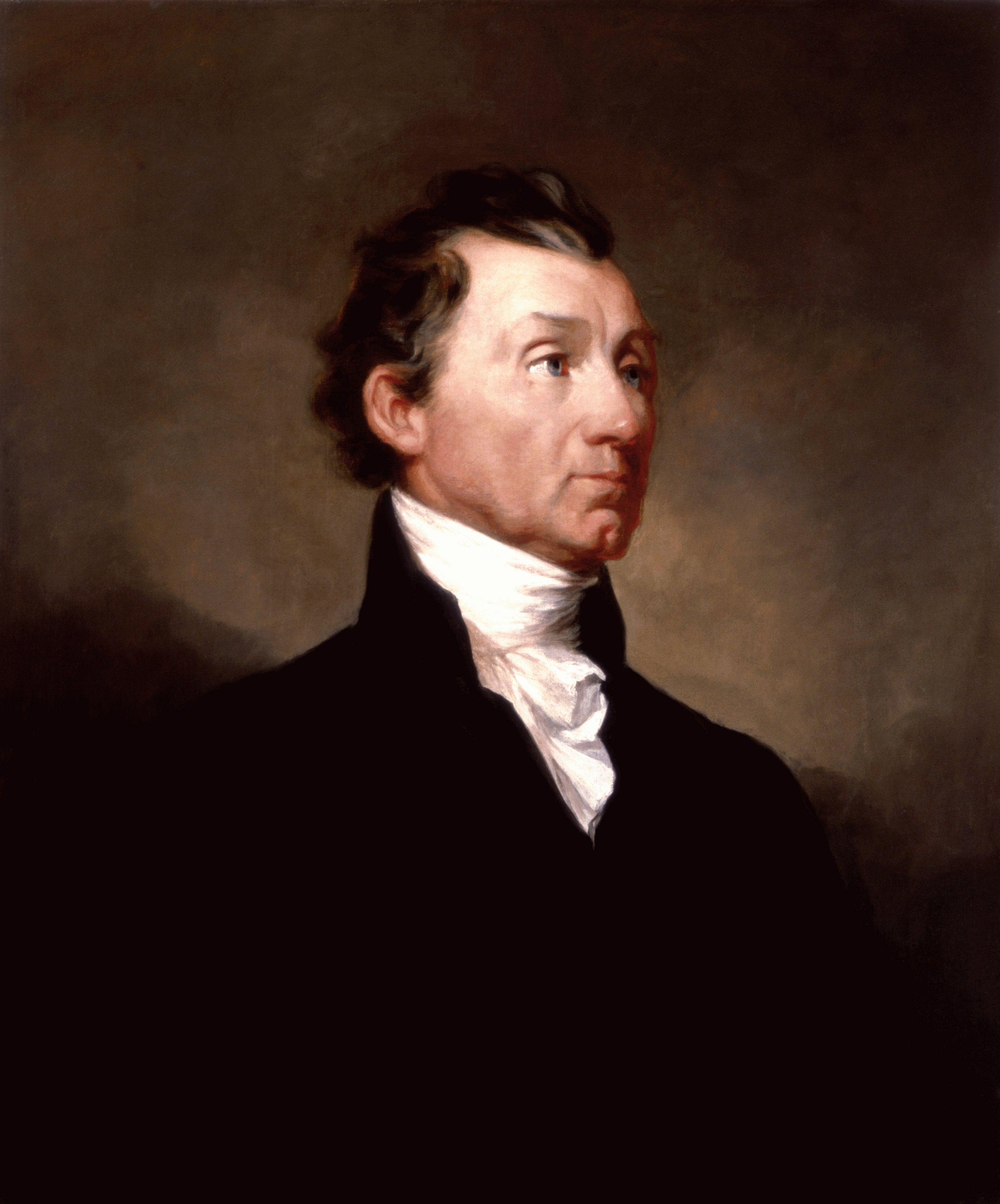
Nominee	James Monroe
Party	Democratic-Republican
Home state	Virginia
Running mate	Daniel D. Tompkins
Electoral vote	3
Legislative vote	212
Percentage	100.00%
President before election
James Monroe
Democratic-Republican
Elected President
James Monroe
Democratic-Republican

The 1820 United States presidential election in Alabama took place between November 1 and December 6, 1820, as part of the nationwide presidential election. The state legislature chose three representatives, or electors to the Electoral College, who voted for President and Vice President.

Alabama, along with eight other states, had its electors chosen not by the people, but by the State House and Senate. George W. Philips, Henry Minor and John Scott were selected by the legislature and all three men voted for James Monroe.

== Results ==
1820 United States presidential election in Alabama
Party	Candidate	Votes	Percentage	Electoral votes
Democratic-Republican	George W. Philips	63	29.72%	1
Democratic-Republican	Henry Minor	62	29.25%	1
Democratic-Republican	John Scott	56	26.42%	1
Democratic-Republican	James S. Walker	31	14.62%	0
Totals		212	100.00%	3

== See also ==
- United States presidential elections in Alabama
