= 1856 United States presidential election in Alabama =

- November 4, 1856
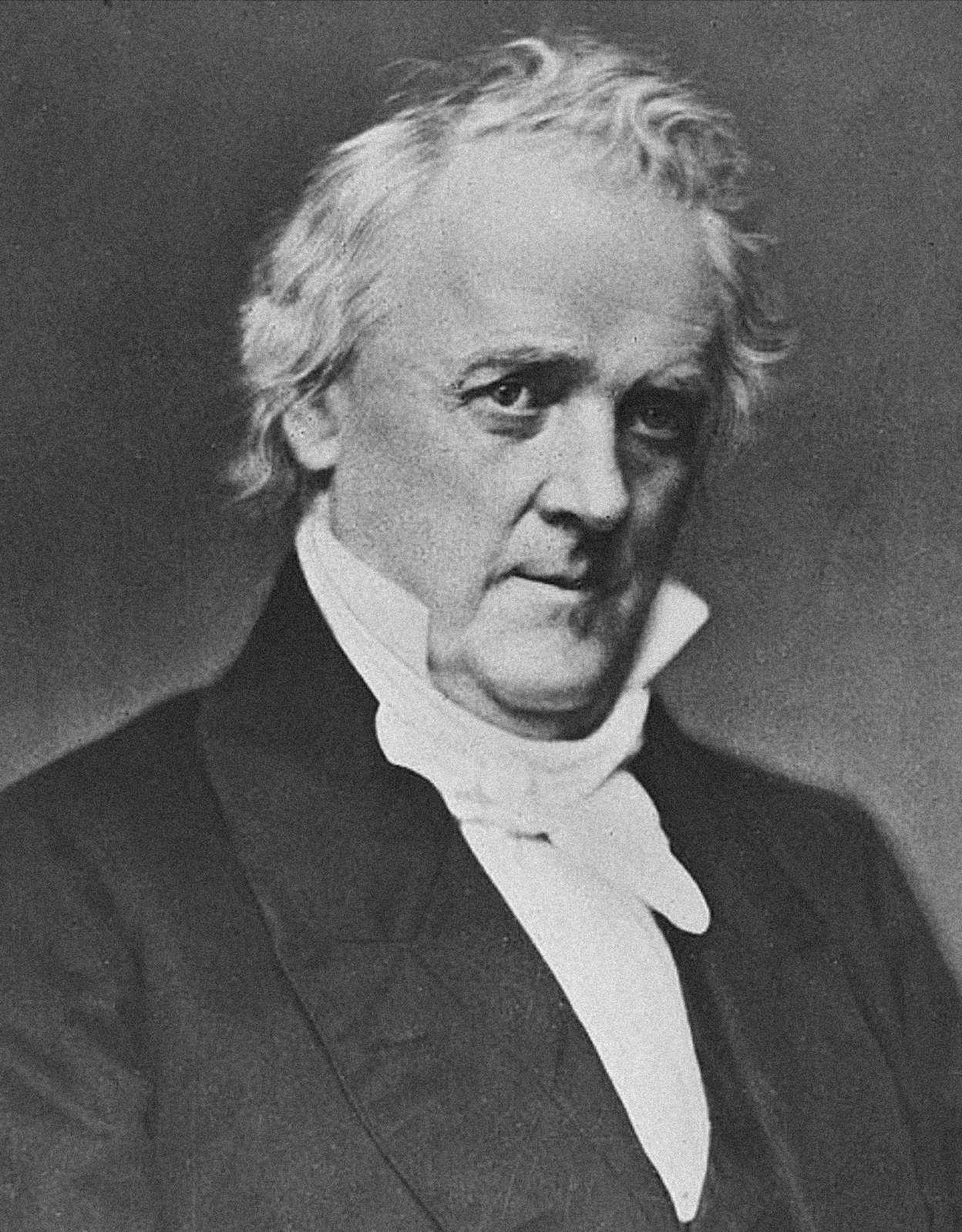

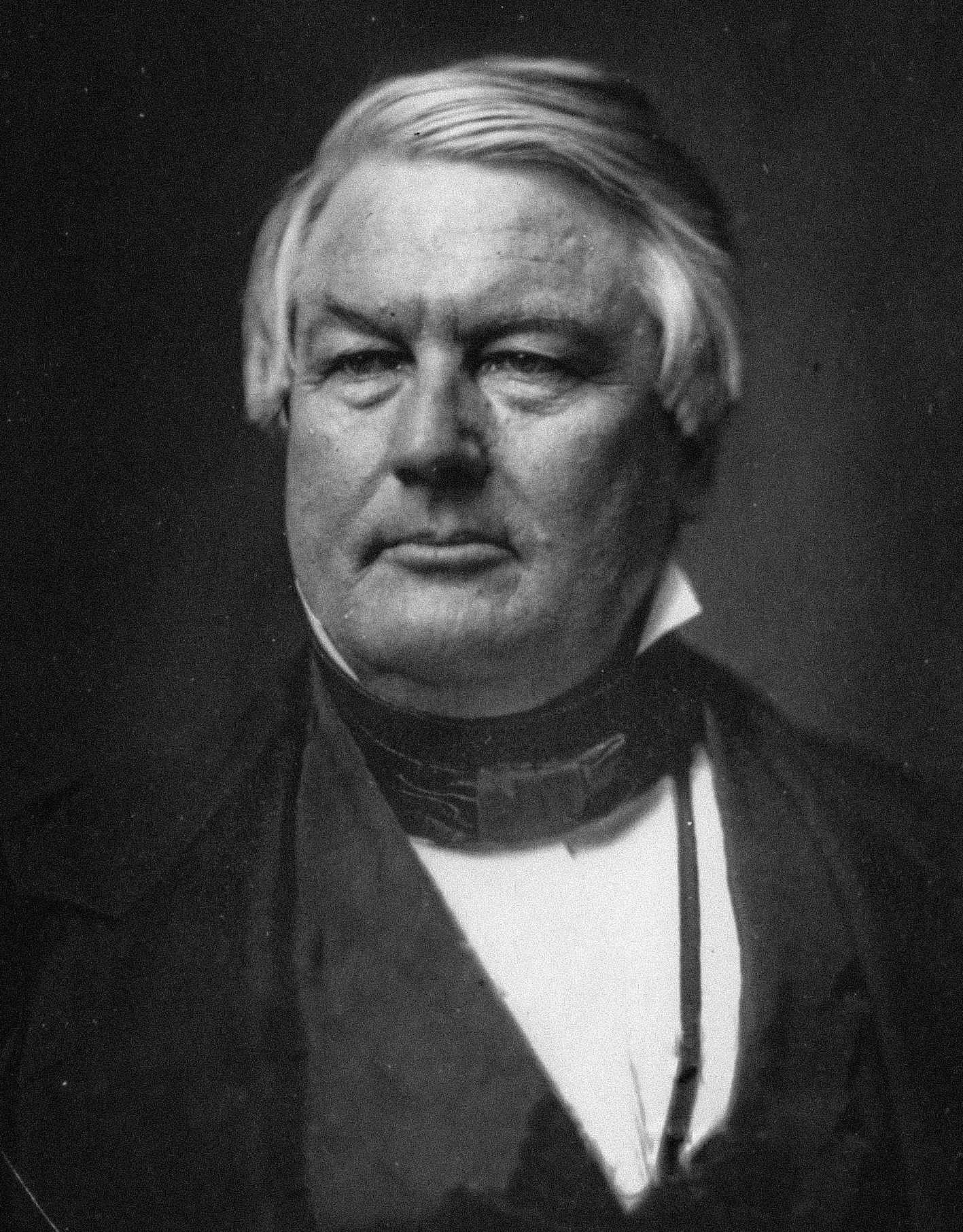
Nominee	James Buchanan	Millard Fillmore
Party	Democratic	Know Nothing
Home state	Pennsylvania	New York
Running mate	John C. Breckinridge	Andrew Jackson Donelson
Electoral vote	9	0
Popular vote	46,739	28,552
Percentage	62.08%	37.92%
County results
Buchanan
50–60%
60–70%
70–80%
80–90%
90–100%
Fillmore
50–60%
60–70%
President before election
Franklin Pierce
Democratic
Elected President
James Buchanan
Democratic

The 1856 United States presidential election in Alabama was held on November 4, 1856. Alabama voters chose 9 electors to represent the state in the Electoral College, which chose the president and vice president.

Alabama was won by Senator James Buchanan (D–Pennsylvania), running with Representative and future presidential candidate in the 1860 presidential election John C. Breckinridge, with 62.08% of the popular vote, against the 13th president of the United States Millard Fillmore (A–New York), running with the 2nd United States Ambassador to Germany Andrew Jackson Donelson, with 37.92% of the popular vote.

The Republican Party nominee John C. Frémont was not on the ballot.

== Results ==
1856 United States presidential election in Alabama
Party	Candidate	Votes	%
Democratic	James Buchanan	46,739	62.08%
Know Nothing	Millard Fillmore	28,552	37.92%
Total votes		75,291	100.00%

=== Results by county ===
1856 United States Presidential Election in Alabama (by county)
County	James Buchanan Democratic		Millard Fillmore Know Nothing		Total votes cast
County	#	%	#	%	Total votes cast
Autauga	621	56.66%	475	43.34%	1,096
Baldwin	144	39.67%	219	60.33%	363
Barbour	1,445	62.77%	857	37.23%	2,302
Benton	1,687	79.20%	443	20.80%	2,130
Bibb	539	52.95%	479	47.05%	1,018
Blount	770	95.42%	37	4.58%	807
Butler	777	49.52%	792	50.48%	1,569
Chambers	1,141	54.13%	967	45.87%	2,108
Cherokee	1,537	77.16%	455	22.84%	1,992
Choctaw	643	61.41%	404	38.59%	1,047
Clarke	754	77.25%	222	22.75%	976
Coffee	703	70.02%	301	29.98%	1,004
Conecuh	425	51.02%	408	48.98%	833
Coosa	1,167	59.27%	802	40.73%	1,969
Covington	304	51.35%	288	48.65%	592
Dale	945	69.28%	419	30.72%	1,364
Dallas	831	55.14%	676	44.86%	1,507
DeKalb	900	87.38%	130	12.62%	1,030
Fayette	799	64.49%	440	35.51%	1,239
Franklin	1,056	59.76%	711	40.24%	1,767
Greene	694	46.96%	784	53.04%	1,478
Hancock	221	94.04%	14	5.96%	235
Henry	966	67.22%	471	32.78%	1,437
Jackson	1,790	94.86%	97	5.14%	1,887
Jefferson	697	78.05%	196	21.95%	893
Lauderdale	1,141	67.28%	555	32.72%	1,696
Lawrence	699	52.56%	631	47.44%	1,330
Limestone	790	73.76%	281	26.24%	1,071
Lowndes	699	49.86%	703	50.14%	1,402
Macon	1,039	45.61%	1,239	54.39%	2,278
Madison	1,476	78.64%	401	21.36%	1,877
Marengo	789	58.19%	567	41.81%	1,356
Marion	700	77.95%	198	22.05%	898
Marshall	883	90.84%	89	9.16%	972
Mobile	1,838	50.93%	1,771	49.07%	3,609
Monroe	604	56.29%	469	43.71%	1,073
Montgomery	1,100	48.72%	1,158	51.28%	2,258
Morgan	808	78.45%	222	21.55%	1,030
Perry	808	49.51%	824	50.49%	1,632
Pickens	1,037	60.79%	669	39.21%	1,706
Pike	1,262	51.72%	1,178	48.28%	2,440
Randolph	1,460	68.13%	683	31.87%	2,143
Russell	994	53.76%	855	46.24%	1,849
Shelby	787	62.71%	468	37.29%	1,255
St. Clair	818	90.79%	83	9.21%	901
Sumter	703	56.92%	532	43.08%	1,235
Talladega	1,134	55.86%	896	44.14%	2,030
Tallapoosa	1,478	53.67%	1,276	46.33%	2,754
Tuscaloosa	680	41.14%	973	58.86%	1,653
Walker	449	75.46%	146	24.54%	595
Washington	194	56.07%	152	43.93%	346
Wilcox	813	64.58%	446	35.42%	1,259
Totals	46,739	62.08%	28,552	37.92%	75,291

== See also ==
- United States presidential elections in Alabama
