= 1868 United States presidential election in Alabama =

- November 3, 1868
- Turnout: 15.51% of the total population
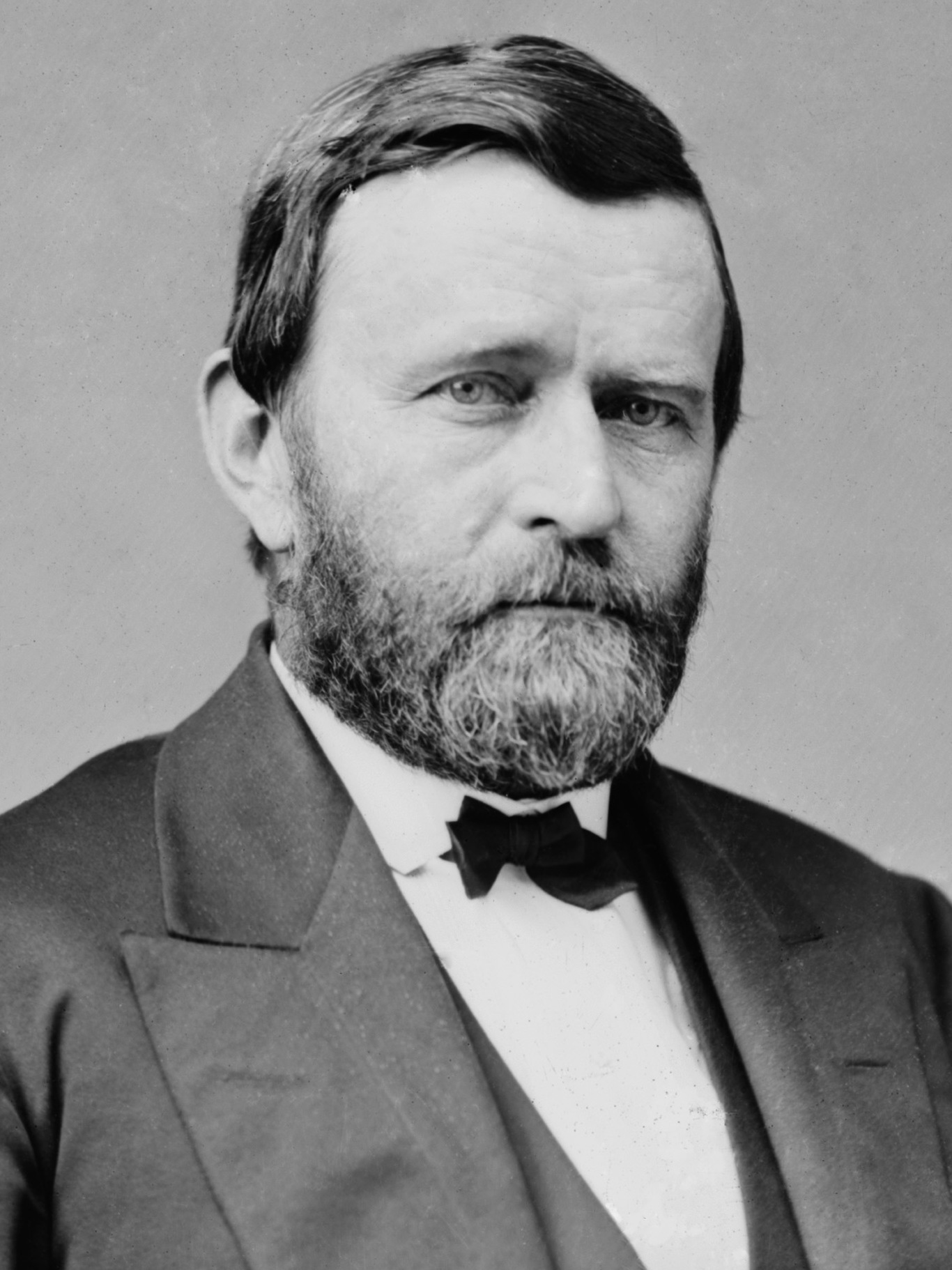

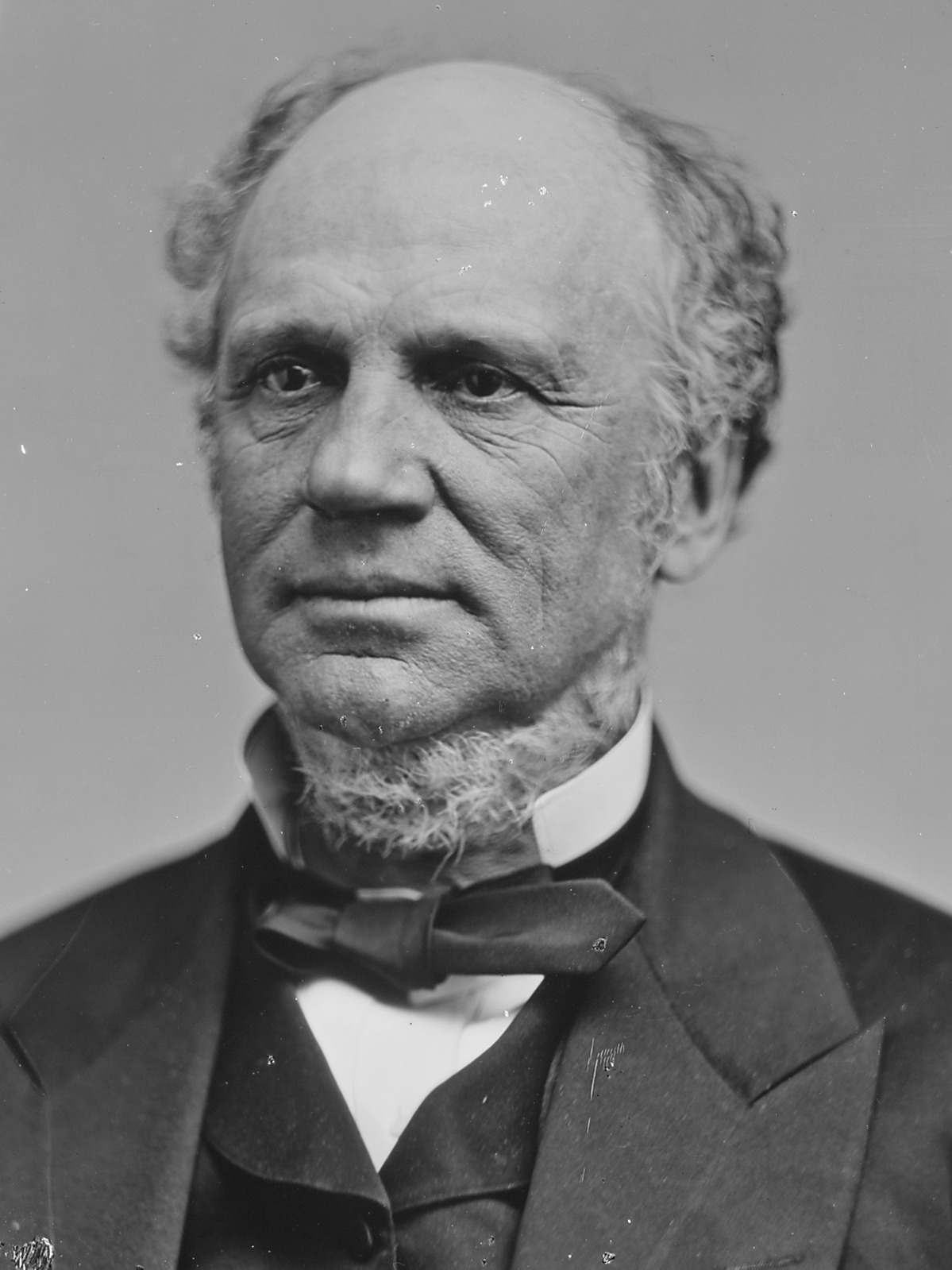
Nominee	Ulysses S. Grant	Horatio Seymour
Party	Republican	Democratic
Home state	Illinois	New York
Running mate	Schuyler Colfax	Francis Preston Blair Jr.
Electoral vote	8	0
Popular vote	76,667	72,921
Percentage	51.25%	48.75%

Grant
50–60%
60–70%
70–80%
80–90%
Seymour
50–60%
60–70%
70–80%
80–90%
90–100%
President before election
Andrew Johnson
Democratic
Elected President
Ulysses S. Grant
Republican

The 1868 United States presidential election in Alabama took place on November 3, 1868, as part of the 1868 presidential election. State voters chose eight representatives, or electors, to the Electoral College, who voted for president and vice president.

Alabama was won by Ulysses S. Grant, formerly the 6th Commanding General of the United States Army (R-Illinois), running with Speaker of the House Schuyler Colfax, with 51.25% of the popular vote, against the 18th governor of New York, Horatio Seymour (D–New York), running with former Senator Francis Preston Blair Jr., with 48.75% of the vote.

Grant was the first Republican presidential candidate ever to have carried Alabama.

== Results ==
1868 United States presidential election in Alabama
Party	Candidate	Votes	%
Republican	Ulysses S. Grant	76,667	51.25%
Democratic	Horatio Seymour	72,921	48.75%
Other	Write-ins	6	0.00%
Total votes		80,329	100%

=== Results By County ===
1868 United States Presidential Election in Alabama (By County)
County	Ulysses S. Grant Republican		Horatio Seymour Democratic		Write-ins Other parties		Total votes cast
County	#	%	#	%	#	%	Total votes cast
Autauga	1,505	63.88%	851	36.12%	0	0.00%	2,356
Baker	283	29.51%	676	70.49%	0	0.00%	959
Baldwin	558	45.33%	673	54.67%	0	0.00%	1,231
Barbour	3,168	58.91%	2,210	41.09%	0	0.00%	5,378
Bibb	492	39.81%	744	60.19%	0	0.00%	1,236
Blount	275	37.36%	461	62.64%	0	0.00%	736
Bullock	2,103	56.28%	1,634	43.72%	0	0.00%	3,737
Butler	724	28.43%	1,823	71.57%	0	0.00%	2,547
Calhoun	600	32.02%	1,274	67.98%	0	0.00%	1,874
Chambers	1,105	43.37%	1,443	56.63%	0	0.00%	2,548
Cherokee	171	15.17%	956	84.83%	0	0.00%	1,127
Choctaw	925	45.39%	1,113	54.61%	0	0.00%	2,038
Clarke	562	32.73%	1,155	67.27%	0	0.00%	1,717
Clay	256	27.26%	683	72.74%	0	0.00%	939
Cleburne	402	50.76%	390	49.24%	0	0.00%	792
Coffee	80	8.67%	843	91.33%	0	0.00%	923
Conecuh	843	48.48%	896	51.52%	0	0.00%	1,739
Coosa	635	39.89%	957	60.11%	0	0.00%	1,592
Covington	0	0.00%	534	100.00%	0	0.00%	534
Crenshaw	90	6.90%	1,214	93.10%	0	0.00%	1,304
Dale	346	22.31%	1,205	77.69%	0	0.00%	1,551
Dallas	7,137	80.05%	1,779	19.95%	0	0.00%	8,916
DeKalb	492	57.34%	360	41.96%	6	0.70%	858
Elmore	1,262	51.32%	1,197	48.68%	0	0.00%	2,459
Etowah	283	28.47%	711	71.53%	0	0.00%	994
Fayette	202	31.76%	434	68.24%	0	0.00%	636
Franklin	90	12.69%	619	87.31%	0	0.00%	709
Greene	2,927	77.11%	869	22.89%	0	0.00%	3,796
Hale	3,297	79.20%	866	20.80%	0	0.00%	4,163
Henry	410	23.91%	1,305	76.09%	0	0.00%	1,715
Jackson	539	25.42%	1,581	74.58%	0	0.00%	2,120
Jefferson	420	43.84%	538	56.16%	0	0.00%	958
Lauderdale	378	20.84%	1,436	79.16%	0	0.00%	1,814
Lawrence	692	34.53%	1,312	65.47%	0	0.00%	2,004
Lee	1,650	48.86%	1,727	51.14%	0	0.00%	3,377
Limestone	355	23.17%	1,177	76.83%	0	0.00%	1,532
Lowndes	3,339	74.04%	1,171	25.96%	0	0.00%	4,510
Macon	2,327	68.40%	1,075	31.60%	0	0.00%	3,402
Madison	1,535	41.59%	2,156	58.41%	0	0.00%	3,691
Marengo	2,793	59.78%	1,879	40.22%	0	0.00%	4,672
Marshall	422	40.66%	616	59.34%	0	0.00%	1,038
Mobile	5,200	43.85%	6,658	56.15%	0	0.00%	11,858
Monroe	58	4.63%	1,196	95.37%	0	0.00%	1,254
Montgomery	6,770	74.51%	2,316	25.49%	0	0.00%	9,086
Morgan	518	43.53%	672	56.47%	0	0.00%	1,190
Perry	3,733	73.63%	1,337	26.37%	0	0.00%	5,070
Pickens	531	26.18%	1,497	73.82%	0	0.00%	2,028
Pike	256	12.37%	1,813	87.63%	0	0.00%	2,069
Randolph	678	52.03%	625	47.97%	0	0.00%	1,303
Russell	1,746	58.67%	1,230	41.33%	0	0.00%	2,976
Sanford	164	23.16%	544	76.84%	0	0.00%	708
Shelby	799	48.63%	844	51.37%	0	0.00%	1,643
St. Clair	632	59.57%	429	40.43%	0	0.00%	1,061
Sumter	2,516	63.14%	1,469	36.86%	0	0.00%	3,985
Talladega	1,771	59.37%	1,212	40.63%	0	0.00%	2,983
Tallapoosa	340	14.03%	2,083	85.97%	0	0.00%	2,423
Tuscaloosa	1,167	45.76%	1,383	54.24%	0	0.00%	2,550
Walker	282	49.39%	289	50.61%	0	0.00%	571
Washington	104	85.95%	17	14.05%	0	0.00%	121
Wilcox	3,396	69.59%	1,484	30.41%	0	0.00%	4,880
Winston	284	87.93%	39	12.07%	0	0.00%	323
Totals	76,384	51.39%	72,245	48.61%	6	0.00%	148,635

== See also ==
- United States presidential elections in Alabama
