= 1848 United States presidential election in Alabama =

- November 7, 1848
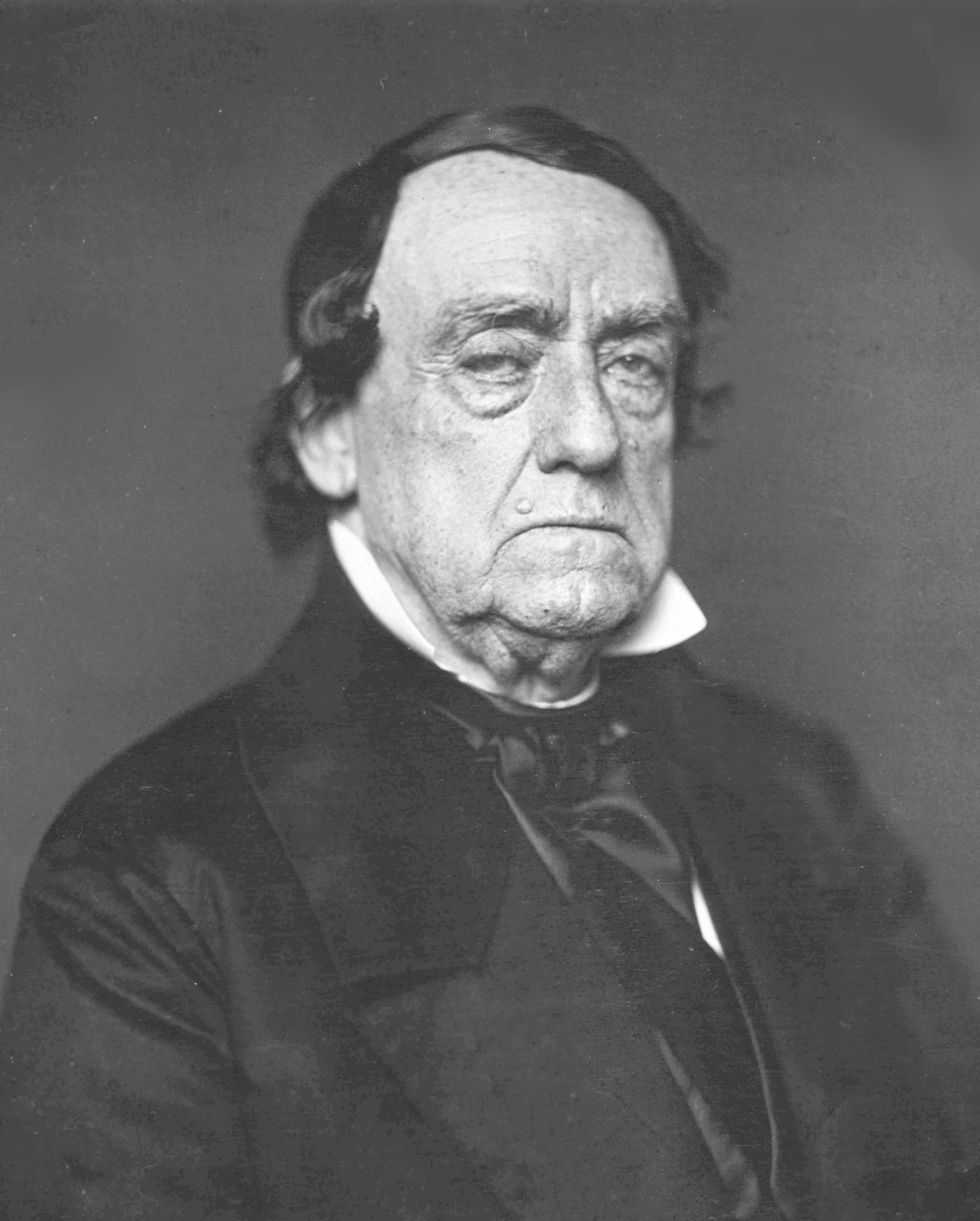

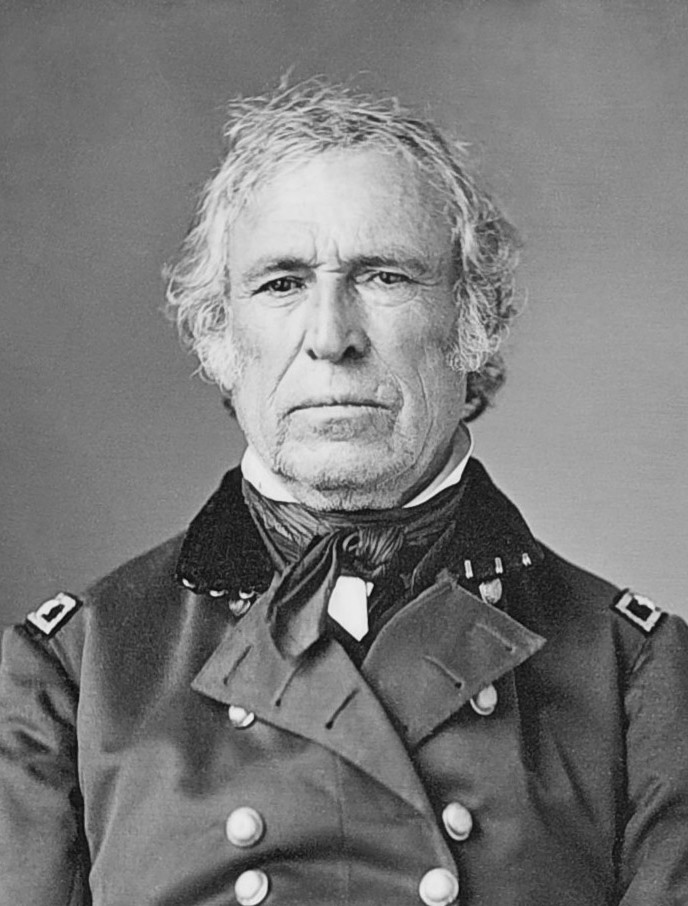
Nominee	Lewis Cass	Zachary Taylor
Party	Democratic	Whig
Home state	Michigan	Louisiana
Running mate	William O. Butler	Millard Fillmore
Electoral vote	9	0
Popular vote	31,173	30,482
Percentage	50.56%	49.43%
County results
Cass
50–60%
60–70%
70–80%
80–90%
90–100%
Taylor
50–60%
60–70%
70–80%
President before election
James K. Polk
Democratic
Elected President
Zachary Taylor
Whig

The 1848 United States presidential election in Alabama took place on November 7, 1848, as part of the 1848 United States presidential election. Voters chose nine representatives, or electors to the Electoral College, who voted for President and Vice President.

Alabama voted for the Democratic candidate, Lewis Cass, over Whig candidate Zachary Taylor. Cass won Alabama by a narrow margin of 1.12%.

== Results ==
1848 United States presidential election in Alabama
Party	Candidate	Votes	%
Democratic	Lewis Cass	31,173	50.56%
Whig	Zachary Taylor	30,482	49.43%
Other	Write-ins	4 (Note: Write-in votes are only given as a statewide total, and are not included in most county manuscripts)	0.01%
Total votes		61,659	100%

=== Results by county ===
1848 United States Presidential Election in Alabama (by county)
County	Lewis Cass Democratic		Zachary Taylor Whig		Total votes cast
County	#	%	#	%	Total votes cast
Autauga	471	46.00%	553	54.00%	1,024
Baldwin	133	57.08%	100	42.92%	233
Barbour	614	33.75%	1,205	66.25%	1,819
Benton	1,272	69.21%	566	30.79%	1,838
Bibb	416	46.74%	474	53.26%	890
Blount	526	79.70%	134	20.30%	660
Butler	277	26.41%	772	73.59%	1,049
Chambers	689	34.24%	1,323	65.76%	2,012
Cherokee	921	59.38%	630	40.62%	1,551
Choctaw	278	42.70%	373	57.30%	651
Clarke	327	73.15%	120	26.85%	447
Coffee	174	47.54%	192	52.46%	366
Conecuh	231	35.16%	426	64.84%	657
Coosa	883	58.52%	626	41.48%	1,509
Covington	92	27.06%	248	72.94%	340
Dale	555	60.13%	368	39.87%	923
Dallas	618	41.81%	860	58.19%	1,478
DeKalb	650	71.66%	257	28.34%	907
Fayette	841	75.56%	272	24.44%	1,113
Franklin	795	60.92%	510	39.08%	1,305
Greene	712	39.56%	1,088	60.44%	1,800
Henry	496	49.60%	504	50.40%	1,000
Jackson	1,589	92.12%	136	7.88%	1,725
Jefferson	385	57.21%	288	42.79%	673
Lauderdale	772	52.62%	695	47.38%	1,467
Lawrence	656	49.73%	663	50.27%	1,319
Limestone	833	69.01%	374	30.99%	1,207
Lowndes	434	36.32%	761	63.68%	1,195
Macon	532	26.65%	1,464	73.35%	1,996
Madison	1,385	74.86%	465	25.14%	1,850
Marengo	553	42.80%	739	57.20%	1,292
Marion	514	72.70%	193	27.30%	707
Marshall	708	74.21%	246	25.79%	954
Mobile	1,073	44.86%	1,319	55.14%	2,392
Monroe	216	31.08%	479	68.92%	695
Montgomery	669	36.26%	1,176	63.74%	1,845
Morgan	335	48.13%	361	51.87%	696
Perry	631	43.31%	826	56.69%	1,457
Pickens	931	47.14%	1,044	52.86%	1,975
Pike	663	41.49%	935	58.51%	1,598
Randolph	770	62.55%	461	37.45%	1,231
Russell	577	37.30%	970	62.70%	1,547
Shelby	368	39.78%	557	60.22%	925
St. Clair	456	75.25%	150	24.75%	606
Sumter	771	48.46%	820	51.54%	1,591
Talladega	820	48.55%	869	51.45%	1,689
Tallapoosa	920	48.63%	972	51.37%	1,892
Tuscaloosa	694	41.56%	976	58.44%	1,670
Walker	383	62.38%	231	37.62%	614
Washington	85	54.14%	72	45.86%	157
Wilcox	479	42.84%	639	57.16%	1,118
Totals	31,173	50.56%	30,482	49.44%	61,655

== See also ==
- United States presidential elections in Alabama
