= Hill v. Cundiff =

2015 sexual assault case in Alabama, US

Hill v. Cundiff refers to a case of minor-on-minor sexual assault that occurred at Sparkman Middle School in Toney, Alabama, on January 22, 2010. The victim, Jane Doe, was a 14-year-old special needs eighth-grader attending the school. The school's policy on sexual harassment was broken into three scenarios: catching the harasser in the act, physical evidence of the harassment, or admission of guilt by the harasser. CJC, the harasser, was a 15-year-old student who had a disciplinary history of violence and sexual misconduct. Before the sexual assault, CJC had five infractions for sexual misconduct and four infractions for violent or threatening behavior.

== Prior context ==
CJC's first relevant infraction was recorded on September 24, 2008. At this time, CJC was a seventh-grader at Ardmore High School. It was reported that CJC received five days of in-school suspension for inappropriate public displays of affection and writing notes to fellow female students asking to have sex with them. CJC also hit another student and received a three-day in-school suspension while at Ardmore.

On December 17, 2008, CJC received an unspecified amount of out-of-school suspension for fighting with another student on the bus, where he hit said student multiple times. This incident was followed by another period of out-of-school suspension on February 4, 2009, for making sexual comments to a young female student. In September 2009, CJC received yet another period of out-of-school suspension for offering to pay another student to beat up a girl and say that he would like to kill her. CJC was suspended from riding the bus on October 23, 2009, for saying "fuck you" to the driver. Just five days later, CJC received in-school-suspension for inappropriate touching, which was coded as disobedience. On November 18, 2009, CJC was suspended from the bus yet again for "refusing to obey [the] driver and keep hands off a female student." The boy was then given more in-school-suspension on December 15, 2009, for a verbal confrontation with another student. Three days afterwards, CJC received out-of-school suspension for threatening another student and intimidation, while serving his in-school-suspension.

== The incident ==
For over two weeks, CJC had been persistently asking Doe to have sex with him, with no response from Doe. Doe told teacher's aide Simpson on January 21, 2010, and, that same night, told her guardian, Patricia Jones, that "a guy at school was trying to have sex with me at school." The next day, CJC was still asking Doe about having sex with him. She went up to Simpson and told him. Simpson replied, "Do you want to get [CJC]" in trouble and Doe replied yes. Simpson advised Doe to meet with CJC so they could set him up and get him caught in the act. This is when Doe replied, saying that she "didn't want to go" and walked to the locker room. Doe and her friend walked to a locker room and talked for a few minutes, before Doe returned as told Simpson that she would do it. Doe found CJC and told him that she would have sex with him. CJC said to meet at the sixth-grade boys' bathroom. Doe and CJC walked into the bathroom and went into the most spacious stall.

In this stall, CJC unbuttoned Doe's pants and then pulled his own pants down. Doe attempted leave to stall, saying that the teachers were going to arrive, and told CJC that she did not want to do this anymore. Doe attempted to pull her pants back up, but CJC overpowered her and anally sexually assaulted Doe.

The two students were eventually found in the bathroom stall. CJC told one of the teachers, Kennedy, that all they were doing was making out. Doe could only tell the other teacher, Campbell, that CJC had "touched" her. Principal Blair interviewed Simpson in his office, where Simpson said she had devised a plan to catch CJC in the act. Simpson said that the plan had gone wrong when Doe failed to meet CJC at the correct bathroom (the one that Simpson had planned on catching him). Both students were interviewed as well. CJC continued to claim that they had only been kissing consensually. When Doe was interviewed, she wrote a statement describing the sexual assault in vivid detail.

CJC was suspended for five days for the sexual assault. Once police had arrived, Doe was transported to a child advocacy center where nurses performed tests. The records from these tests were consistent with anal sexual assault. For unknown reasons, the Madison County District Attorney's Office never filed charges against CJC. After his suspension, CJC returned to Sparkman Middle School.

== Legal proceedings ==
Represented by her father, James Hill, Doe filed a complaint against the Madison County School Board, Principal Ronnie J. Blair, Assistant Principal Teresa G. Terrell, Assistant Principal Jeanne Dunaway, and Teacher's Aide June Ann Simpson, claiming a violation of the Equal Protection Clause. The lawsuit had initially been dismissed, but the Eleventh Circuit Court of Appeals overturned that ruling, reinstating Doe's claims. The Eleventh Circuit Court determined that the principal "deprived Doe of equal protection through his deliberate indifference to inadequate sexual harassment policies."

== Aftermath ==
Parents protested outside of the Madison County School Board meeting on October 16, 2014, to demand the school district take greater accountability for the assault. In 2015, a petition was presented to the school district's new superintendent with more than 103,000 signatures of people seeking the firing of Ronnie Blair and Jeanne Dunaway.

Doe reports that, other than feeling unsafe at school and wanting to be alone, her grades began to decline, and she did not like to play basketball anymore. Doe transferred to another school out of the state, and eventually dropped out of that school before graduating. Since the sexual assault, Doe has been under the care of both a psychologist and a psychiatrist.

An agreement was met in court in March 2016 that the claims against the Madison County school officials would be dismissed in exchange for an undisclosed amount of money.
