= Gurley Historic District =

Historic district in Alabama, United States

- U.S. National Register of Historic Places
- U.S. Historic district
- Alabama Register of Landmarks and Heritage
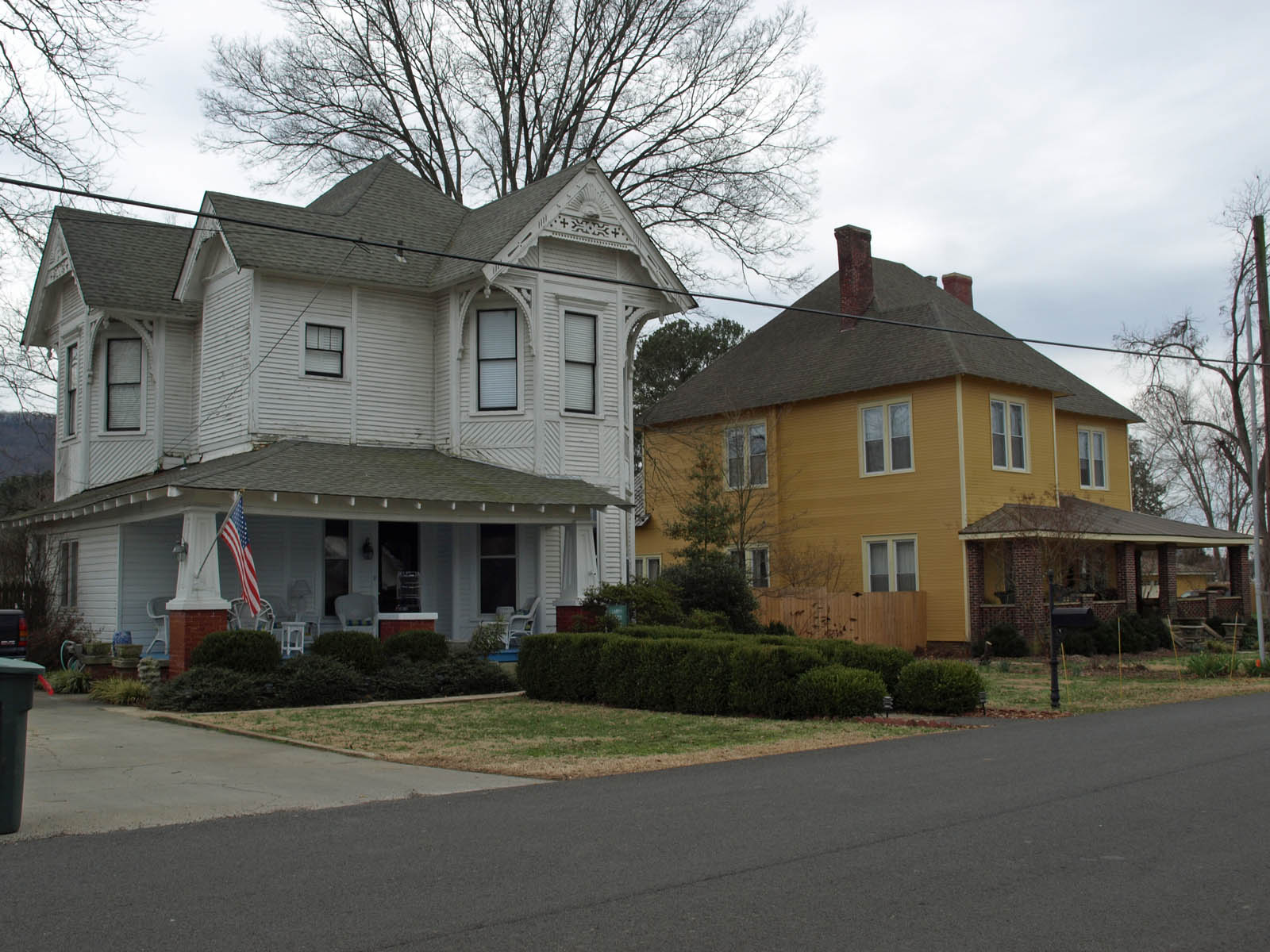
- The H. A. Smith and William Walker Houses in February 2012

- Location within Alabama Location within the United States
- Location: Section Line St., Railroad St., Maple Blvd. and Church St. bet. Gurley Pike and Jackson St., Gurley, Alabama
- Coordinates: 34°42′0″N 86°22′25″W
- Area: 70 acres (28 ha)
- Architectural style: Late Victorian, Late 19th And 20th Century Revivals
- NRHP reference No.: 04000562

Significant dates
- Added to NRHP: June 2, 2004
- Designated ARLH: November 17, 1995

The Gurley Historic District is a historic district in Gurley, Alabama. The district was listed on the Alabama Register of Landmarks and Heritage in 1995 and the National Register of Historic Places in 2004.

== History ==
The town was originally the plantation of John Gurley, who came to Madison County from North Carolina in the 1830s. In 1857, the Memphis and Charleston Railroad built its line through the property, and Gurley constructed a water tank to service the line's locomotives. A post office was established in 1866, at which time only a few families lived in the area. The town incorporated in 1890, and the population immediately began to grow. Industry was attracted to the area by its abundance of lumber; many sawmills, producers of wooden barrels, and the Eagle Pencil Company set up shop near the town. Retail establishments were centered on Joplin Street, however a fire in 1923 destroyed most of the structures. Depletion of the area's timber and the greater influence of neighboring Huntsville drew industry away in the 1920s and 1930s, though despite declining population a new Madison County High School was built in 1936.

The oldest extant building in the district is the Captain Elijah F. Walker House, built in 1874 by the Civil War veteran who would later serve in the Alabama House of Representatives. The majority of the remaining structures were built between 1891 and 1910; notable among them is the H. A. Smith House, an elaborate Queen Anne house built by a carpenter who would later serve as postmaster. Several other houses exhibit Queen Anne, American Craftsman, and Bungalow details, though most are less decorated folk architectural forms. Two churches in the district, the United Methodist church built in 1891 and the Presbyterian church built in 1912, are Gothic Revival in style.
