= Madison County Schools (Alabama) =

School district in Alabama, United States

Madison County Schools is a school district in Madison County, Alabama, United States, headquartered in an unincorporated area, bordering Huntsville.

Communities in the district include: Gurley, Harvest, Hazel Green, Meridianville, Moores Mill, New Hope, Owens Cross Roads, New Market, Redstone Arsenal, Toney, and Triana. It also includes a few parcels of Huntsville.

== Education ==
It is the 8th largest district in the state in terms of enrollment with approximately 19,700 students and 1,168 faculty.

There are 29 schools:

=== High schools ===
- Buckhorn High School, New Market
- Hazel Green High School, Hazel Green
- Madison County Career Tech Center, Huntsville
- Madison County High School, Gurley
- New Hope High School, New Hope
- Sparkman High School, Harvest

=== Other schools ===
- Buckhorn Middle School, New Market
- Central School, Huntsville
- Endeavor Elementary School, Harvest
- Harvest Elementary School, Harvest
- Hazel Green Elementary School, Hazel Green
- Legacy Elementary School, Madison
- Lynn Fanning Elementary School, Meridianville
- Madison County Elementary School, Gurley
- Madison Cross Roads School, Toney
- Meridianville Middle School, Meridianville
- Monrovia Elementary School, Huntsville
- Monrovia Middle School, Huntsville
- Moores Mill Intermediate, New Market
- Mt. Carmel Elementary School, Huntsville
- New Hope Elementary School, New Hope
- New Market School, New Market
- Owens Cross Roads School, Owens Cross Roads
- Pace School, Huntsville
- Riverton Elementary School, Huntsville
- Riverton Intermediate School, Huntsville
- Sparkman Intermediate School, Toney
- Sparkman Middle School, Harvest
- Walnut Grove School, New Market
