= Madison County, Alabama =

County in Alabama, United States

- County
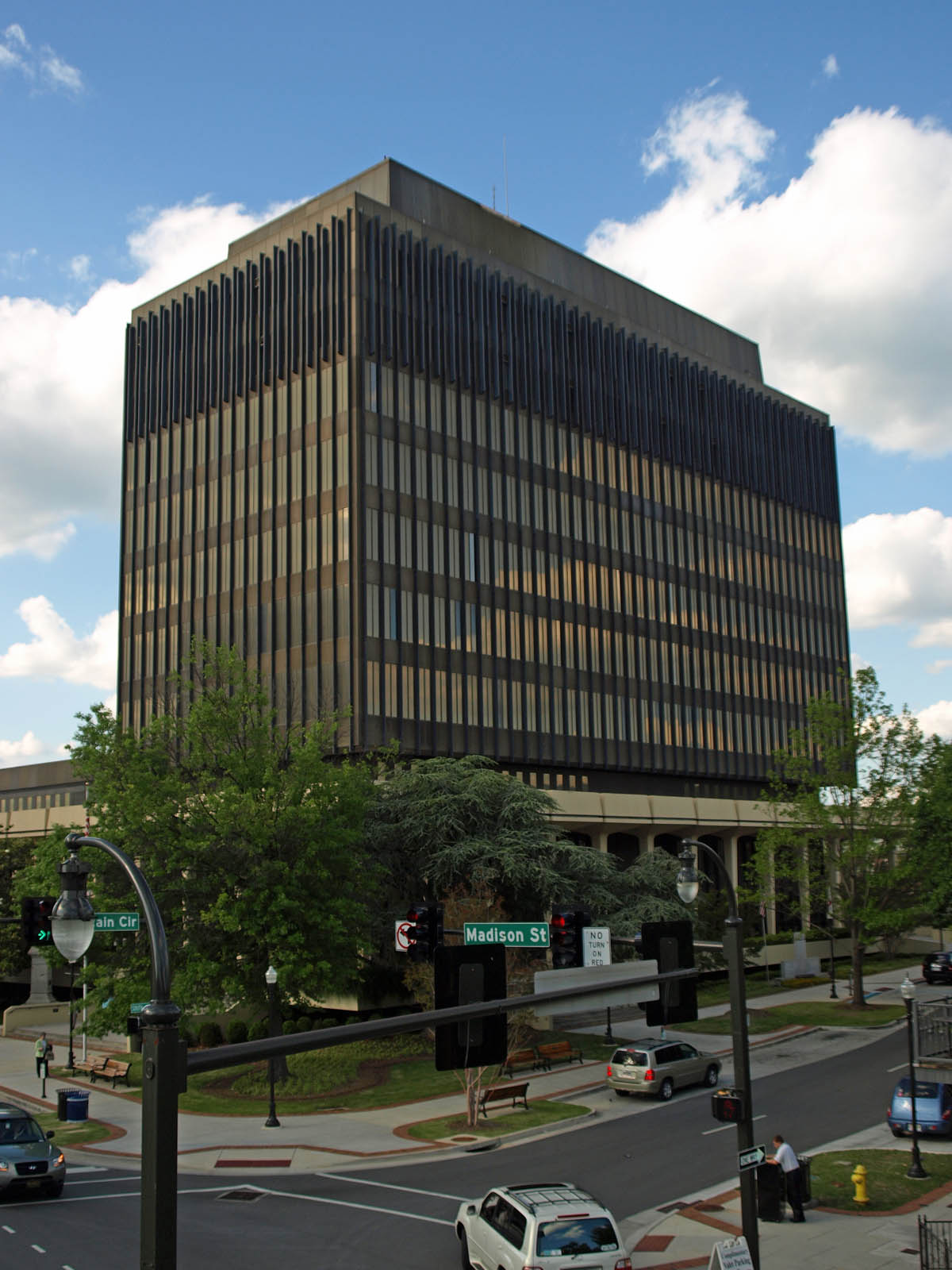
- Madison County Courthouse in Huntsville

- Seal

- Location within the U.S. state of Alabama
- Coordinates: 34°45′57″N 86°33′28″W
- Country: United States
- State: Alabama
- Founded: December 13, 1808
- Named for: James Madison
- Seat: Huntsville
- Largest city: Huntsville

Government
  - Commission Chairman: Mac McCutcheon

Area
  - Total: 813 sq mi (2,110 km^{2})
  - Land: 802 sq mi (2,080 km^{2})
  - Water: 11 sq mi (28 km^{2}) 1.4%

Population (2020)
  - Total: 388,153
  - Estimate (2025): 433,516 ▲
  - Density: 484/sq mi (187/km^{2})
- Time zone: UTC−6 (Central)
  - Summer (DST): UTC−5 (CDT)
- Congressional district: 5th
- Website: www.madisoncountyal.gov
- County Number 47 on Alabama License Plates; Largest County by population not shuffled to top 2 on Alabama License Plates

Madison County is a county located in the north central portion of the U.S. state of Alabama. As of the 2020 Census, the population was 388,153, and according to a 2023 population estimate the county has become the second-most populous county in Alabama after only Jefferson County, home to Birmingham. Its county seat is Huntsville. Since the mid-20th century it has become an area of defense and space research and industry. The county is named in honor of James Madison, fourth President of the United States and the first President to visit the state of Alabama. Madison County covers parts of the former Decatur County. Madison County is included in the Huntsville, Alabama Metropolitan Statistical Area.

== History ==
=== Mississippi Territory ===
Madison County was established on December 13, 1808, by the governor of the Mississippi Territory. The land was ceded by the Cherokee under the Treaty of Washington signed 1806, ratified 1807. The county was named for James Madison. There were 2,223 whites and 322 enslaved blacks resident in the county in 1809. The lands were surveyed in 1809 and initially sold out of the land office at Nashville, Tennessee. In 1811 the town of Huntsville was incorporated within the county and the General Land Office was relocated there from Nashville.

=== Alabama ===
Madison County is recognized as the "birthplace" of the state of Alabama, which was admitted to the Union on December 14, 1819. Huntsville was designated as the first capital of the new state.

For much of the county's history, its economy was based on agriculture, particularly cotton plantations, which were established across the uplands. These plantations and their owners' profits were dependent on the labor of enslaved African Americans before the Civil War. Madison County was one of the largest cotton-producing counties in the state.

Madison County was the largest county in Alabama in population from 1810 to 1840. In the 1810 census alone, Madison County made up nearly half of the population in what would become Alabama, though this did not include Native American tribes and their people. By 1850 however it would lose the title and be the 7th due to its population growth having slowed down. The likely reason was due to Madison County having mainly relied on cotton with little to no other industries.

Cotton remained important after the war. Most labor for cultivation was still provided by African Americans, but they worked as sharecroppers and tenant farmers. By the late 19th century, textile mills had been established around the county; they were restricted to white workers by the Jim Crow practices of racial segregation. During the early 20th century, the economy continued to be largely agricultural, although textile mills expanded their production.

During World War II, the Army established Redstone Arsenal here as a chemical weapon manufacturing site, and the county attracted related industries. After the war, it became a center of new weapon and rocket development. In 1950, a group of former Nazi rocket scientists, led by Wernher von Braun, were brought by the U.S. Army to Redstone Arsenal in order to develop new types of rockets.

By the 1960s, research expanded to rockets for space exploration. The Redstone rocket was modified to launch the first two Americans into space. The US began to emphasize investment in the Space Race, in order to compete with the Soviet Union during the Cold War years and to increase scientific gains. This work in the defense and space industries has generated tens of thousands of jobs in the area, most of them private contractors working in these fields. The population of Madison County has risen from 72,903 in 1950 to an estimated 403,565 in 2022.

== Geography ==
According to the United States Census Bureau, the county has a total area of 813 square miles (2,110 km^{2}), of which 802 square miles (2,080 km^{2}) is land and 11 square miles (28 km^{2}) (1.4%) is water.

The topography in the southern and eastern portions of the county is dominated by the dissected remnants of the Cumberland Plateau, such as Keel Mountain, Monte Sano Mountain and Green Mountain. The northern and western portions of the county are flatter.

=== Rivers ===
- Tennessee River
- Flint River
- Paint Rock River

=== Adjacent counties ===
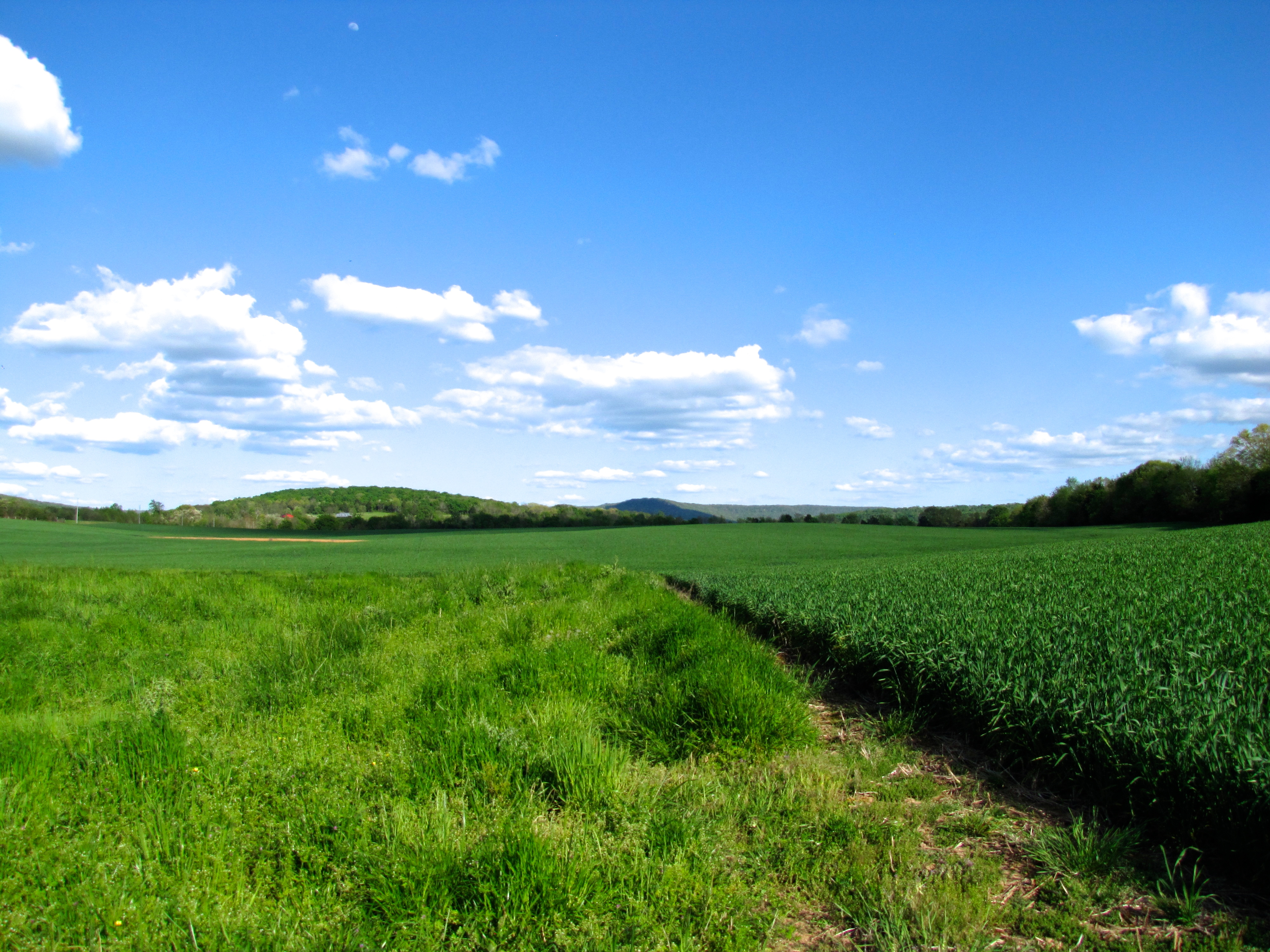
Farm fields near New Market

- Lincoln County, Tennessee (north)
- Franklin County, Tennessee (northeast)
- Jackson County (east)
- Marshall County (southeast)
- Morgan County (southwest)
- Limestone County (west)

=== National protected area ===
- Wheeler National Wildlife Refuge (part)

== Demographics ==
Historical population
Census	Pop.	Note	%±
1810	4,699		—
1820	17,481		272.0%
1830	27,990		60.1%
1840	25,706		−8.2%
1850	26,427		2.8%
1860	26,451		0.1%
1870	31,267		18.2%
1880	37,625		20.3%
1890	38,119		1.3%
1900	43,702		14.6%
1910	47,041		7.6%
1920	51,268		9.0%
1930	64,623		26.0%
1940	66,317		2.6%
1950	72,903		9.9%
1960	117,348		61.0%
1970	186,540		59.0%
1980	196,966		5.6%
1990	238,912		21.3%
2000	276,700		15.8%
2010	334,811		21.0%
2020	388,153		15.9%
2025 (est.)	433,516	▲	11.7%
U.S. Decennial Census; 1790–1960 1900–1990; 1990–2000 2010–2020

=== 2020 census ===
As of the 2020 census, there were 388,153 people, 157,770 households, and 101,684 families residing in the county. The population density was 484.2 inhabitants per square mile (187.0/km^{2}).

The median age was 38.3 years. 21.6% of residents were under the age of 18 and 15.5% of residents were 65 years of age or older. For every 100 females there were 95.2 males, and for every 100 females age 18 and over there were 93.0 males age 18 and over.

The racial makeup of the county was 62.5% White, 23.7% Black or African American, 0.8% American Indian and Alaska Native, 2.7% Asian, 0.1% Native Hawaiian and Pacific Islander, 2.7% from some other race, and 7.6% from two or more races. Hispanic or Latino residents of any race comprised 6.4% of the population.

82.9% of residents lived in urban areas, while 17.1% lived in rural areas.

There were 157,770 households in the county, of which 28.9% had children under the age of 18 living with them and 28.4% had a female householder with no spouse or partner present. About 30.1% of all households were made up of individuals and 10.1% had someone living alone who was 65 years of age or older.

There were 169,820 housing units, of which 7.1% were vacant. Among occupied housing units, 66.3% were owner-occupied and 33.7% were renter-occupied. The homeowner vacancy rate was 1.3% and the rental vacancy rate was 7.7%.

=== Racial and ethnic composition ===
Madison County, Alabama – Racial and ethnic composition Note: the US Census treats Hispanic/Latino as an ethnic category. This table excludes Latinos from the racial categories and assigns them to a separate category. Hispanics/Latinos may be of any race.
Race / Ethnicity (NH = Non-Hispanic)	Pop 1980	Pop 1990	Pop 2000	Pop 2010	Pop 2020	% 1980	% 1990	% 2000	% 2010	% 2020
White alone (NH)	153,498	182,334	196,496	221,445	237,497	77.93%	76.32%	71.01%	66.14%	61.19%
Black or African American alone (NH)	38,721	47,826	62,602	79,517	91,079	19.66%	20.02%	22.62%	23.75%	23.46%
Native American or Alaska Native alone (NH)	443	1,564	2,067	2,335	2,132	0.22%	0.65%	0.75%	0.70%	0.55%
Asian alone (NH)	1,508	4,140	5,107	8,167	10,179	0.77%	1.73%	1.85%	2.44%	2.62%
Native Hawaiian or Pacific Islander alone (NH)	x	x	140	321	450	x	x	0.05%	0.10%	0.12%
Other race alone (NH)	710	64	300	471	1,702	0.36%	0.03%	0.11%	0.14%	0.44%
Mixed race or Multiracial (NH)	x	x	4,762	7,151	20,178	x	x	1.72%	2.14%	5.20%
Hispanic or Latino (any race)	2,086	2,984	5,226	15,404	24,936	1.06%	1.25%	1.89%	4.60%	6.42%
Total	196,966	238,912	276,700	334,811	388,153	100.00%	100.00%	100.00%	100.00%	100.00%

=== 2010 ===
As of the 2010 census, there were 334,811 people, 109,955 households, out of which 33.00% had children under the age of 18 living with them; 53.40% were married couples living together, 11.80% had a female householder with no husband present, and 31.50% were non-families. Nearly 27.20% of all households were made up of individuals, and 7.40% had someone living alone who was 65 years of age or older. The average household size was 2.45, and the average family size was 3.00.

In the county, the population was spread out, with 25.60% under the age of 18, 9.40% from 18 to 24, 31.50% from 25 to 44, 22.70% from 45 to 64, and 10.80% who were 65 years of age or older. The median age was 36 years. For every 100 females, there were 95.30 males. For every 100 females age 18 and over, there were 92.10 males.

The median income for a household in the county was $44,704, and the median income for a family was $54,360. Males had a median income of $40,779 versus $26,534 for females. The per capita income for the county was $23,091. About 8.10% of families and 10.50% of the population were below the poverty line, including 14.10% of those under age 18 and 9.60% of those age 65 or over.

=== 2000 ===
As of the 2000 census, there were 276,700 people, 109,955 households, and 75,319 families residing in the county. The population density was 344 people per square mile (133 people/km^{2}). There were 120,288 housing units at an average density of 149 units per square mile (58 units/km^{2}). The racial makeup of the county was 72.06% White, 22.78% Black or African American, 0.77% Native American, 1.86% Asian, 0.06% Pacific Islander, 0.59% from other races, and 1.89% from two or more races. Nearly 1.91% of the population were Hispanic or Latino of any race.

According to the 2000 census, the largest ancestry groups in Madison County were English 50.2%, African 22.78%, Scots-Irish 8.71%, Irish 4.3%, Scottish 4.12%, and Welsh 2.9%.

== Communities ==
=== Cities ===
- Huntsville (county seat; portions in Limestone, Marshall, and Morgan Counties)
- Madison (partly in Limestone County)
- New Hope
- Owens Cross Roads

=== Towns ===
- Gurley
- Triana

=== Census-designated places ===
- Harvest
- Hazel Green
- Meridianville
- Moores Mill
- New Market
- Redstone Arsenal

=== Unincorporated communities ===
- Big Cove
- Brownsboro
- Chase
- Hobbs Island
- Maysville
- Monrovia
- Moontown
- Plevna
- Poplar Ridge
- Rainbow
- Ryland
- Toney

== Education ==
The Madison County School System operates public schools throughout unincorporated Madison County as well as the municipalities of Gurley, New Hope, and Owens Cross Roads. Communities served include Hazel Green, Harvest, Meridianville, Monrovia, Moores Mill, New Market, Redstone Arsenal, and Toney. It also includes a few parcels of Huntsville.. The system has 14 elementary schools, 4 middle schools, 5 high schools and a ninth grade school, and a career/technical center.

High schools in the Madison County School System are:

- Buckhorn High School (New Market)
- Hazel Green High School
- Madison County High School (Gurley)
- New Hope High School
- Sparkman High School (Harvest)

There are a number of private schools serving Madison County. These include Randolph School, Madison Academy, Westminster Christian Academy, Faith Christian Academy, and several others.

Madison City and the vast majority of Huntsville both have their own separate school systems (Madison City School District and Huntsville City School District). The Madison City School District also includes the town of Triana.

== Transportation ==
=== Major highways ===
- I-565 / US 72 Alt.
- US 72 / SR 2 (unsigned)
- US 231
- US 431 / SR 1 (unsigned)
- SR 53
- SR 255

=== Transit ===
- Orbit

=== Rail ===
- Norfolk Southern Railway
- Huntsville and Madison County Railroad Authority

=== Air travel ===
The Port of Huntsville provides both passenger air service, via Huntsville International Airport which allows access to most of the rest of the United States, and shipping air service, via the International Intermodal Center. There are also three smaller public airports in the county: Hazel Green Airport, Madison County Executive Airport, and Moontown Airport.

=== Bicycle routes ===
There are several bicycle routes in the city of Huntsville. Madison County has a master plan to develop a 70-mile bicycle and walking trail.

== Politics ==
Madison County was formerly an overwhelmingly Democratic county as with most of the rest of Alabama, with only a narrow loss by Al Smith in 1928 due to Prohibitionist anti-Catholicism disrupting this trend until the 1960s. Even in 1964, the county nearly voted against Barry Goldwater due to its opposition to the Arizona Senator's privatization plans for the Tennessee Valley Authority. However, since that time, the county has become solidly Republican, with the only national Democratic nominee to carry the county since 1960 being Deep South native Jimmy Carter in 1976.

In the 2016 election, Gary Johnson had his best showing in the state, carrying 4.05 percent of the vote. The county is trending less Republican recently, 58.9% in 2004, 56.9% in 2008, 54.8% in 2016, and in 2020 the Republican margin of victory was the lowest since 1980. The county shifted right by 1% in 2024, compared to the state shifting right by 5%.

For Alabama counties supporting Donald Trump in 2016, it was the fourth narrowest margin, and in 2020 the third-narrowest after Conecuh and Barbour.

The governing body of the county is a commission. The commission is responsible for levying the county tax, establish, maintain, and discontinue county roads and bridges. The commission is also responsible for the county jail as well as the sheriff's department. The County Commission is composed of seven members. A Chairman is elected at-large by the county while each of the other six members is elected by their districts. Each commissioner serves a four-year term. In 2020, Violet Edwards made history becoming the first black woman to be elected to the Madison County Commission.

United States presidential election results for Madison County, Alabama
Year	Republican		Democratic		Third party(ies)	
Year	No.	%	No.	%	No.	%
1824	194	11.77%	1,295	78.58%	159	9.65%
1828	204	9.34%	1,980	90.66%	0	0.00%
1832	0	0.00%	1,451	100.00%	0	0.00%
1836	420	20.02%	1,678	79.98%	0	0.00%
1840	393	16.53%	1,985	83.47%	0	0.00%
1844	357	17.19%	1,720	82.81%	0	0.00%
1848	465	25.14%	1,385	74.86%	0	0.00%
1852	354	21.40%	1,300	78.60%	0	0.00%
1856	0	0.00%	1,476	78.64%	401	21.36%
1860	0	0.00%	1,300	56.74%	991	43.26%
1868	1,535	41.59%	2,156	58.41%	0	0.00%
1872	2,991	54.81%	2,466	45.19%	0	0.00%
1876	2,777	44.79%	3,423	55.21%	0	0.00%
1880	3,062	48.15%	2,808	44.16%	489	7.69%
1884	3,155	52.02%	2,800	46.17%	110	1.81%
1888	2,595	54.77%	2,136	45.08%	7	0.15%
1892	3	0.05%	3,046	45.72%	3,614	54.24%
1896	2,548	37.73%	4,056	60.06%	149	2.21%
1900	1,679	31.27%	3,641	67.80%	50	0.93%
1904	182	7.87%	2,119	91.61%	12	0.52%
1908	277	11.13%	2,168	87.10%	44	1.77%
1912	150	5.47%	2,146	78.21%	448	16.33%
1916	215	8.69%	2,206	89.17%	53	2.14%
1920	489	14.64%	2,822	84.49%	29	0.87%
1924	368	14.23%	2,166	83.76%	52	2.01%
1928	2,695	50.11%	2,681	49.85%	2	0.04%
1932	559	10.35%	4,792	88.76%	48	0.89%
1936	514	8.26%	5,661	91.01%	45	0.72%
1940	566	9.28%	5,515	90.44%	17	0.28%
1944	455	8.39%	4,951	91.33%	15	0.28%
1948	466	13.22%	0	0.00%	3,060	86.78%
1952	1,623	16.36%	8,216	82.82%	81	0.82%
1956	2,993	24.63%	9,054	74.52%	103	0.85%
1960	5,299	32.34%	10,959	66.88%	128	0.78%
1964	14,279	51.93%	0	0.00%	13,217	48.07%
1968	13,213	25.43%	8,004	15.41%	30,736	59.16%
1972	38,899	73.42%	13,108	24.74%	977	1.84%
1976	20,959	36.59%	35,497	61.96%	831	1.45%
1980	30,604	47.03%	30,469	46.82%	3,999	6.15%
1984	50,428	64.54%	26,881	34.40%	825	1.06%
1988	53,575	67.06%	25,800	32.29%	519	0.65%
1992	51,444	47.71%	38,974	36.14%	17,416	16.15%
1996	50,390	49.96%	42,259	41.90%	8,209	8.14%
2000	62,151	54.85%	48,199	42.53%	2,968	2.62%
2004	77,173	58.88%	52,644	40.17%	1,245	0.95%
2008	86,965	56.88%	64,117	41.93%	1,817	1.19%
2012	90,884	58.47%	62,015	39.90%	2,529	1.63%
2016	89,520	54.79%	62,822	38.45%	11,047	6.76%
2020	102,780	52.77%	87,286	44.82%	4,701	2.41%
2024	105,430	53.35%	87,824	44.44%	4,363	2.21%

United States Senate election results for Madison County, Alabama2
Year	Republican		Democratic		Third party(ies)	
Year	No.	%	No.	%	No.	%
2020	99,181	51.10%	94,458	48.67%	443	0.23%

United States Senate election results for Macon County, Alabama3
Year	Republican		Democratic		Third party(ies)	
Year	No.	%	No.	%	No.	%
2022	70,577	58.57%	45,976	38.15%	3,947	3.28%

Alabama Gubernatorial election results for Macon County
Year	Republican		Democratic		Third party(ies)	
Year	No.	%	No.	%	No.	%
2022	72,059	59.86%	42,176	35.04%	6,143	5.10%

== Places of interest ==
Madison County is home to Monte Sano State Park, the U.S. Space & Rocket Center, and part of the Flint River. It also contains Hampton Cove Golf Course, part of the Robert Trent Jones Golf Trail. There is a historical marker for Lincoln School and Village which were incorporated into Huntsville in 1956.

Other attractions include the Orion Amphitheater and Big Springs International Park.

== See also ==
- National Register of Historic Places listings in Huntsville, Alabama
- National Register of Historic Places listings in Madison County, Alabama
- Properties on the Alabama Register of Landmarks and Heritage in Madison County, Alabama
- Redstone Arsenal cemeteries
