= Hazel Green Airport =

- IATA: none; ICAO: none; FAA LID: M38

Summary
- Owner: Hazel Green Flyers, Inc.
- Serves: Hazel Green, Alabama
- Elevation AMSL: 814 ft (248 m)
- Coordinates: 34°54′58″N 086°38′50″W
- Interactive map of Hazel Green Airport

Runways
Direction	Length		Surface
Direction	ft	m	Surface
7/25	2,670	814	Asphalt

Statistics (1997)
- Aircraft operations: 11,240
- Based aircraft: 20
- Source: Federal Aviation Administration

Hazel Green Airport (FAA LID: M38) is a privately owned airport, located four nautical miles (7 km) west of the central business district of Hazel Green, a community in Madison County, Alabama, United States.

== Facilities and aircraft ==
Hazel Green Airport covers an area of 30 acres (12 ha) at an elevation of 814 feet (248 m) above mean sea level. It has one runway designated 7/25 with an asphalt surface measuring 2,670 by 40 feet (814 x 12 m).

For the 12-month period ending October 29, 1997, the airport had 11,240 general aviation aircraft operations, an average of 30 per day. At that time there were 20 aircraft based at this airport: 90% single-engine and 10% glider.

== See also ==
- List of airports in Alabama
