= Owens Cross Roads, Alabama =

- City
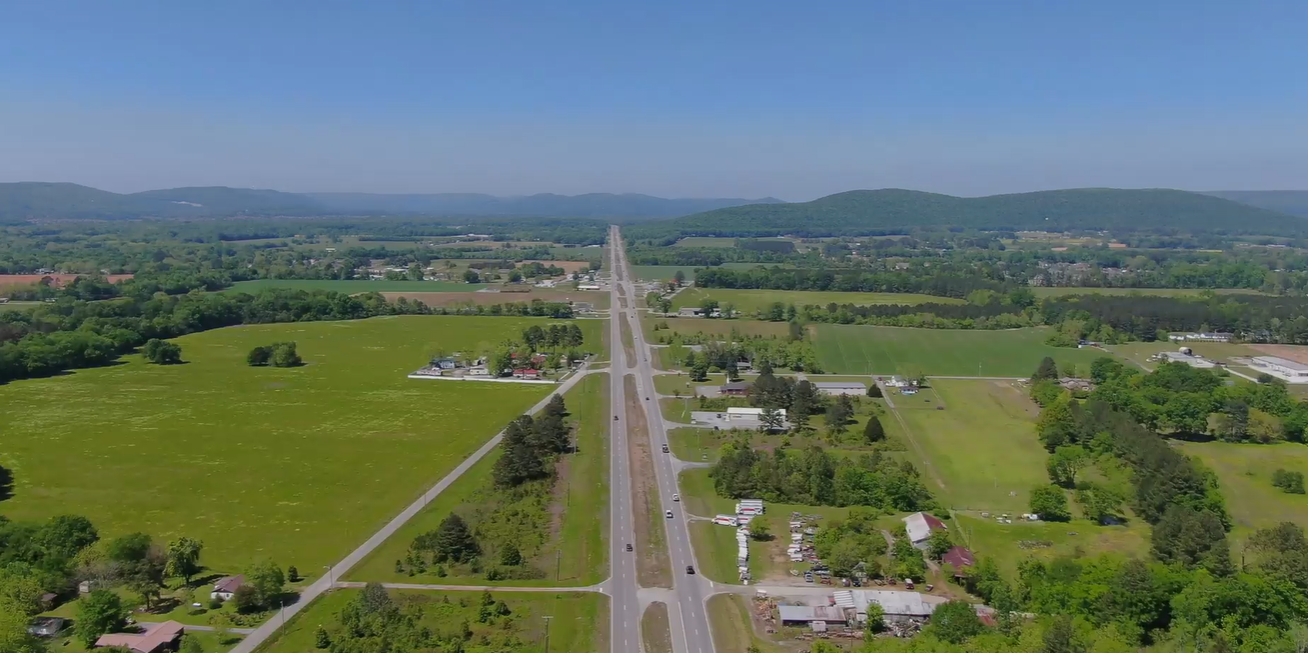
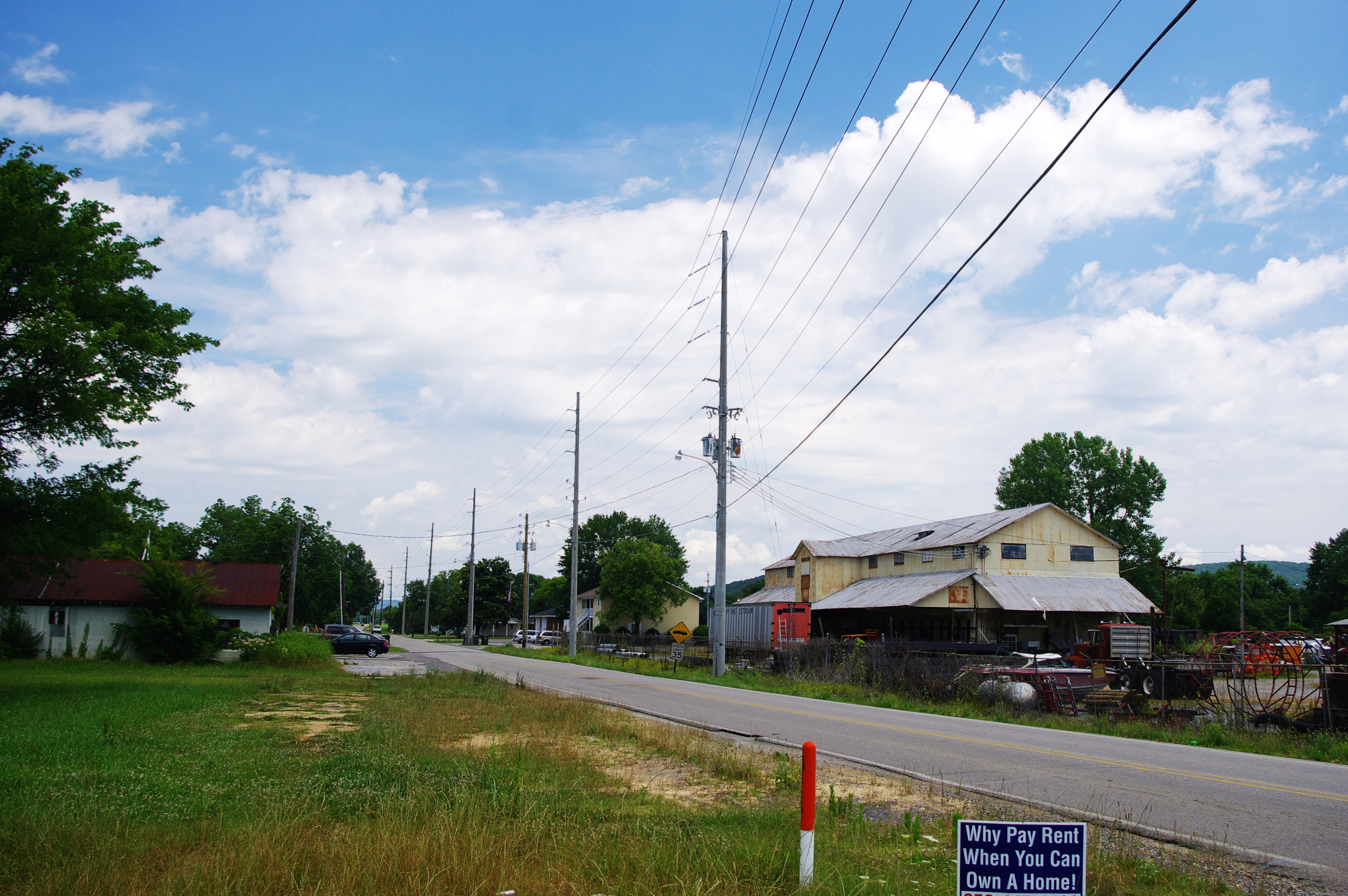
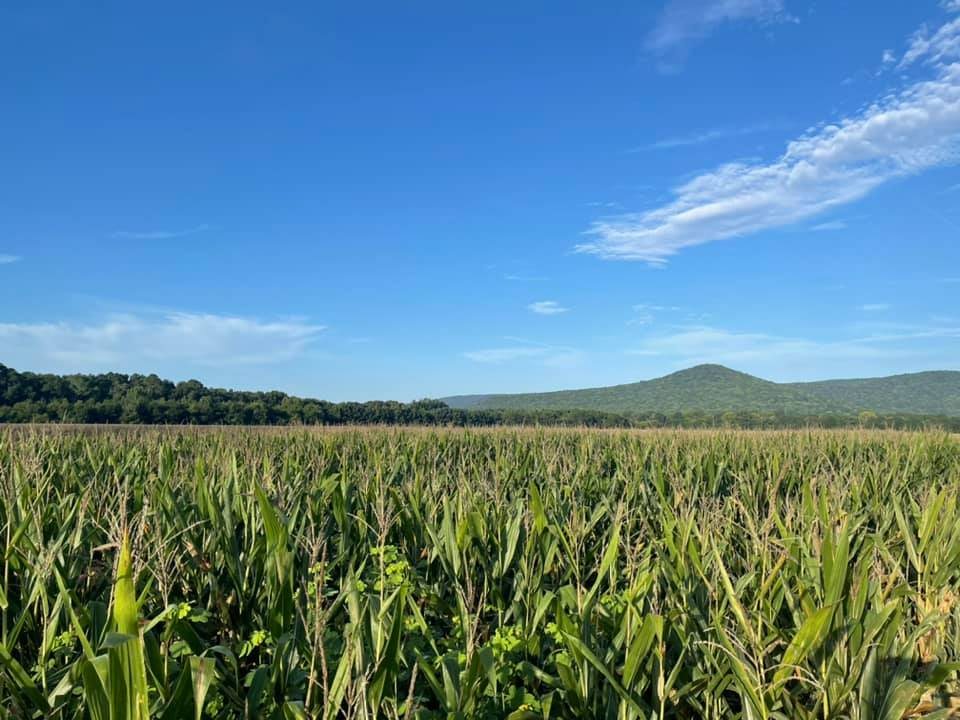
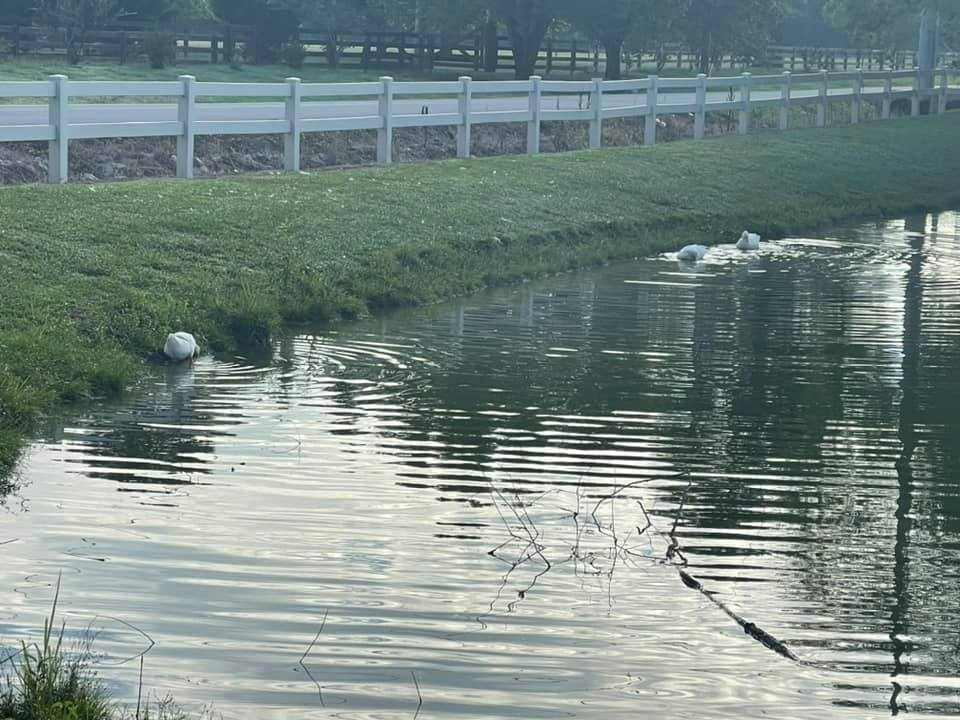
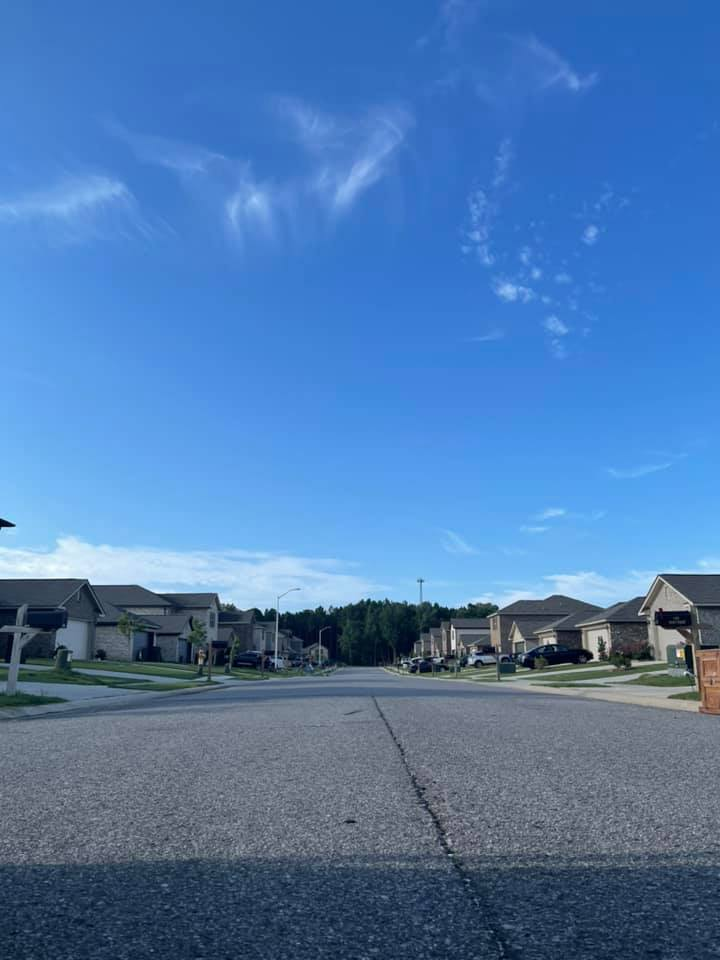
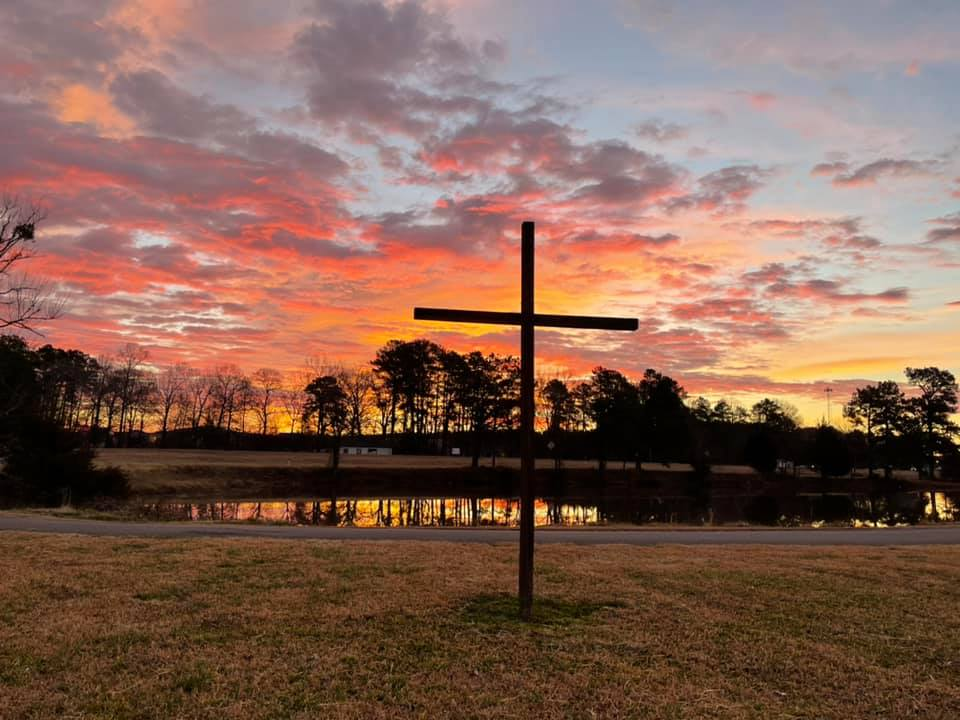
- Overlooking Owens Cross Roads US 431 Old Highway 431 in the Center of Owens Cross Roads A field in Owens Cross Roads A neighborhood pond A neighborhood street Sunday morning sunrise

- Flag Seal
- Interactive map of Owens Cross Roads, Alabama
- Location within Alabama
- Coordinates: 34.5855°N 86.4550°W
- Country: United States
- State: Alabama
- County: Madison
- Incorporated (town): October 9, 1967
- Incorporated (city): October 10, 2022

Government
  - Type: Mayor–council
  - Mayor: Tony Craig
  - Mayor Pro Tempore: Scott Baker
  - Councilmembers: Elizabeth Craig; Claude Lang; Dan Arvidson; Jennifer Liddle

Area
  - Total: 8.064 sq mi (20.886 km^{2})
  - Land: 7.944 sq mi (20.576 km^{2})
  - Water: 0.120 sq mi (0.311 km^{2}) 1.49%
- Elevation: 584 ft (178 m)

Population (2020)
  - Total: 2,594
  - Estimate (2025): 3,334
  - Density: 326.5/sq mi (126.1/km^{2})
- Time zone: UTC–6 (Central (CST))
  - Summer (DST): UTC–5 (CDT)
- ZIP Code: 35763
- Area codes: 256 and 938
- FIPS code: 01-57504
- GNIS feature ID: 2407060
- Website: owenscrossroadsal.org

Owens Cross Roads is a city in Madison County, Alabama, United States, and is included in the Huntsville-Decatur Combined Statistical Area. It was incorporated as a town on October 9, 1967, and later met the city threshold of 2,000 population in 2020, later changing its designation to city on October 10, 2022. The population was 2,594 as of the 2020 census, and was estimated at 3,334 in 2025. It is home to Brazelton Cemetery.

== History ==
The area has a history that can be dated back to the early 1800's. Pioneers had drifted into the area from Tennessee, Virginia, North Carolina, South Carolina and Georgia with names such as Wood, Parker, Craig, Craft, Maples, Carpenter and Brannum, but a gentleman named Thomas J. Owens had migrated from Virginia and was the first to build his family home near an intersection of two roads.

The name Owens Cross Roads was very appropriately chosen since the Owens home was at "the cross roads". The community grew in size at a steady pace over the years as a large frame business house was erected near the intersection, containing a post office (established 1861), general store and blacksmith shop. Owens Cross Roads first appeared on maps in 1850.

Following the Civil War, the population grew as businesses sprang up and a new school was erected to replace the original log schoolhouse. With the turn of the 20th century came new growth to the neighboring towns of Huntsville and Guntersville, making Owens Cross Roads a welcome stop for travelers between the two larger towns. The town relied heavily on cotton cultivation throughout much of its early history, with some crop diversification coming in the 1920s and 1930s.

=== Incorporation ===
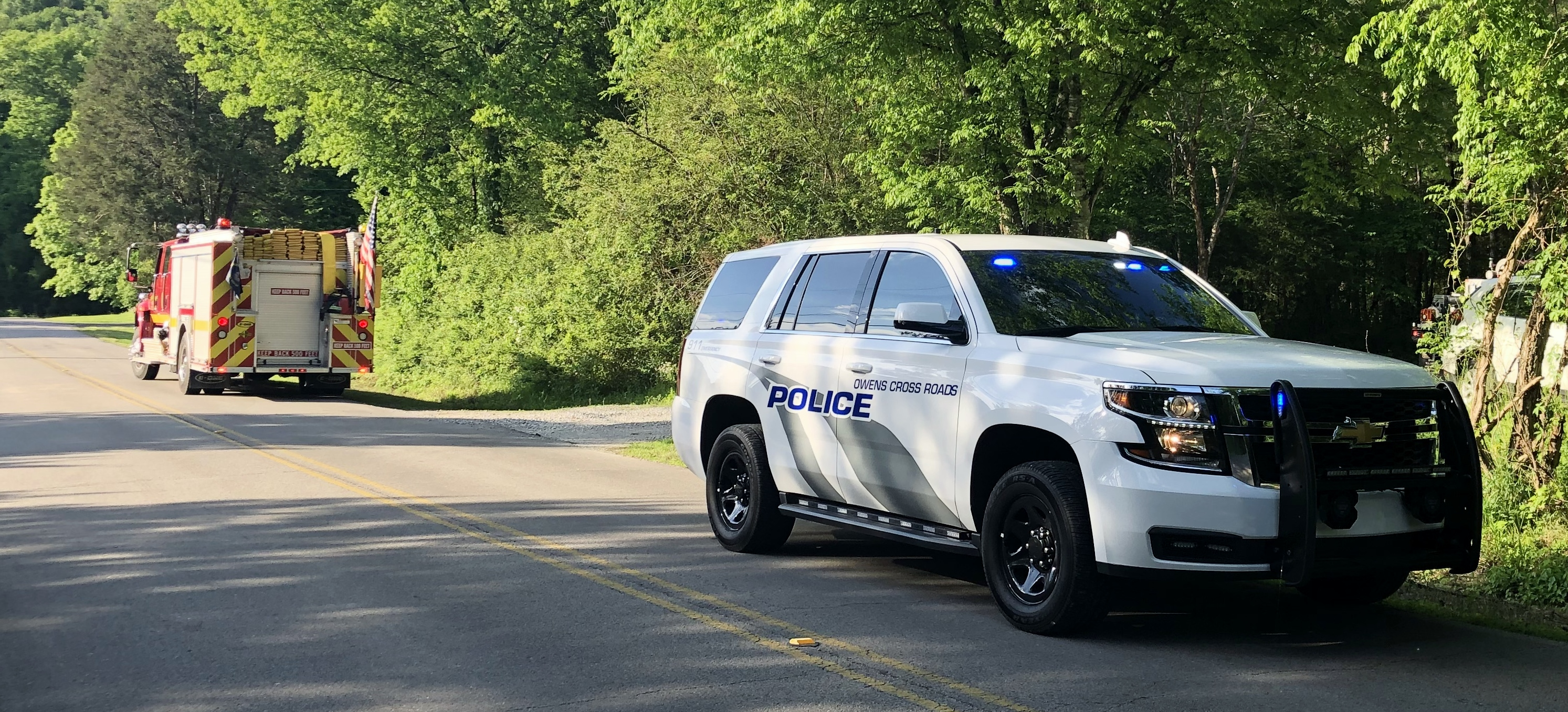
Owens Cross Roads Police and Volunteer Fire on a scene

Incorporated in 1967, Owens Cross Roads City Hall faces U.S. Route 431. The municipality includes a Blue Ribbon-designated public school, a Volunteer Fire Department, and a municipal Police Department.

== Geography ==
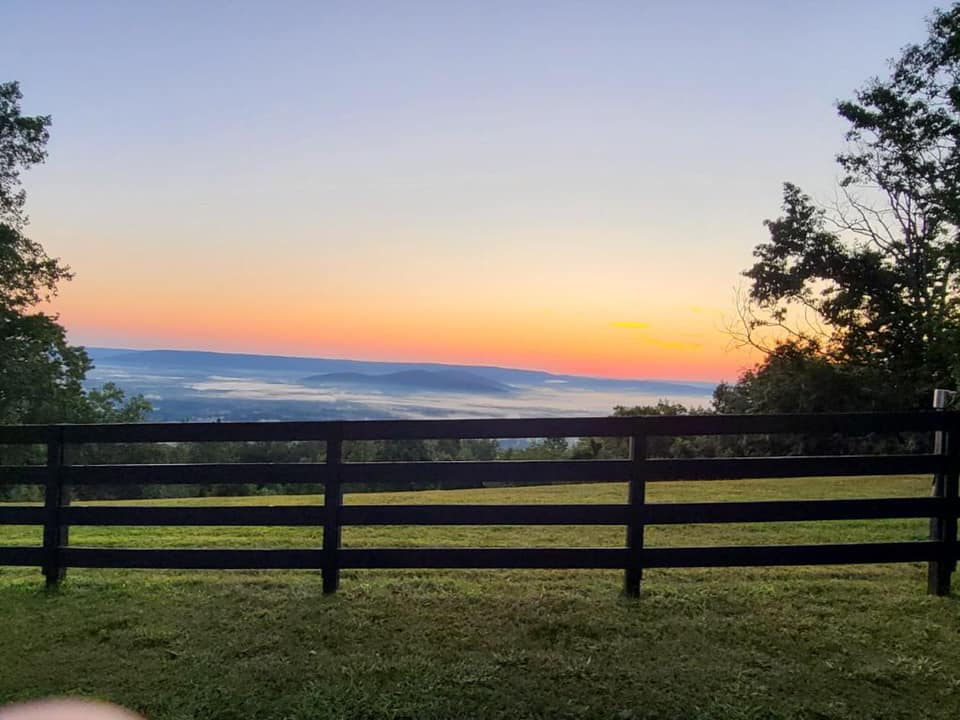
Looking off Green Mountain to the Owens Cross Roads area below.

Owens Cross Roads is situated in a broad valley carved by the Flint River. Rugged hills and mountains surround the town, including Green Mountain to the west, and Keel Mountain to the east. Huntsville lies across Green Mountain to the northwest, New Hope lies just to the southeast, and Paint Rock lies across Keel Mountain to the northeast. U.S. Route 431 passes through Owens Cross Roads, connecting the town with Huntsville and Guntersville. Owens Cross Roads met the threshold to become a city in 2020 with the population exceeding 2,000 persons under Alabama law

According to the United States Census Bureau, the city has an area of 8.064 square miles (20.89 km^{2}), of which 7.944 square miles (20.57 km^{2}) is land and 0.120 square miles (0.31 km^{2}) (1.49%) is water.

== Demographics ==
Historical population
Census	Pop.	Note	%±
1970	767		—
1980	804		4.8%
1990	695		−13.6%
2000	1,124		61.7%
2010	1,521		35.3%
2020	2,594		70.5%
2025 (est.)	3,334		28.5%
U.S. Decennial Census; 2020 Census

According to realtor website Zillow, the average price of a home as of July 31, 2026, in Owens Cross Roads was $437,409.

As of the 2024 American Community Survey, there were 965 estimated households in Owens Cross Roads with an average of 2.85 persons per household. The city has a median household income of $86,188. Approximately 10.1% of the city's population lives at or below the poverty line. Owens Cross Roads has an estimated 60.8% employment rate, with 24.4% of the population holding a bachelor's degree or higher and 85.2% holding a high school diploma. There were 1,003 housing units at an average density of 126.26 per square mile (48.75/km^{2}).

The top five reported languages (people were allowed to report up to two languages, thus the figures will generally add to more than 100%) were English (96.6%), Spanish (1.4%), Indo-European (1.7%), Asian and Pacific Islander (0.3%), and Other (0.0%).

The median age in the city was 32.1 years.

Owens Cross Roads, Alabama – racial and ethnic composition Note: the US Census treats Hispanic/Latino as an ethnic category. This table excludes Latinos from the racial categories and assigns them to a separate category. Hispanics/Latinos may be of any race.
Race / ethnicity (NH = non-Hispanic)	Pop. 2000	Pop. 2010	Pop. 2020	% 2000	% 2010	% 2020
White alone (NH)	1,071	1,371	1,992	95.28%	90.14%	76.79%
Black or African American alone (NH)	8	51	201	0.71%	3.35%	7.75%
Native American or Alaska Native alone (NH)	8	15	35	0.71%	0.99%	1.35%
Asian alone (NH)	3	4	29	0.27%	0.26%	1.12%
Pacific Islander alone (NH)	0	0	4	0.00%	0.00%	0.15%
Other race alone (NH)	1	1	14	0.09%	0.07%	0.54%
Mixed race or multiracial (NH)	26	45	198	2.31%	2.96%	7.63%
Hispanic or Latino (any race)	7	34	121	0.62%	2.24%	4.66%
Total	1,124	1,521	2,594	100.00%	100.00%	100.00%

=== 2020 census ===
As of the 2020 census, there were 2,594 people, 978 households, and 718 families residing in the city. The population density was 311.33 inhabitants per square mile (120.21/km^{2}). There were 1,032 housing units at an average density of 123.86 per square mile (47.82/km^{2}). The racial makeup of the city was 78.53% White, 7.79% African American, 1.39% Native American, 1.12% Asian, 0.15% Pacific Islander, 1.70% from some other races and 9.33% from two or more races. Hispanic or Latino people of any race were 4.66% of the population.

=== 2010 census ===
As of the 2010 census, there were 1,521 people, 593 households, and 409 families residing in the town. The population density was 183.30 inhabitants per square mile (70.77/km^{2}). There were 650 housing units at an average density of 78.33 per square mile (30.24/km^{2}). The racial makeup of the town was 91.52% White, 3.62% African American, 0.99% Native American, 0.33% Asian, 0.00% Pacific Islander, 0.59% from some other races and 2.96% from two or more races. Hispanic or Latino people of any race were 2.24% of the population.

There were 593 households 30.4% had children under the age of 18 living with them, 53.3% were married couples living together, 10.5% had a female householder with no husband present, and 31.0% were non-families. 27.0% of households were one person and 8.7% were one person aged 65 or older. The average household size was 2.41 and the average family size was 2.91.

The age distribution was 23.1% under the age of 18, 7.8% from 18 to 24, 28.3% from 25 to 44, 23.9% from 45 to 64, and 16.9% 65 or older. The median age was 38.1 years. For every 100 females, there were 97.0 males. For every 100 females age 18 and over, there were 107.0 males.

The median household income was $40,625 and the median family income was $43,750. Males had a median income of $43,889 versus $33,393 for females. The per capita income for the town was $21,542. About 23.6% of families and 31.2% of the population were below the poverty line, including 60.9% of those under age 18 and 6.1% of those age 65 or over.

=== 2000 census ===
As of the 2000 census, there were 1,124 people, 443 households, and 329 families residing in the town. The population density was 145.76 inhabitants per square mile (56.28/km^{2}). There were 482 housing units at an average density of 62.51 per square mile (24.14/km^{2}). The racial makeup of the town was 95.64% White, 0.71% African American, 0.71% Native American, 0.27% Asian, 0.00% Pacific Islander, 0.36% from some other races and 2.31% from two or more races. Hispanic or Latino people of any race were 0.62% of the population.

There were 443 households out of which 29.8% had children under the age of 18 living with them, 60.0% were married couples living together, 9.9% had a female householder with no husband present, and 25.7% were non-families. 21.9% of all households were made up of individuals and 8.6% had someone living alone who was 65 years of age or older. The average household size was 2.47 and the average family size was 2.88.

In the town the population was spread out with 23.3% under the age of 18, 8.4% from 18 to 24, 29.6% from 25 to 44, 24.7% from 45 to 64, and 14.0% who were 65 years of age or older. The median age was 38 years. For every 100 females there were 95.8 males. For every 100 females age 18 and over, there were 95.0 males.

The median income for a household in the town was $34,856, and the median income for a family was $45,167. Males had a median income of $30,781 versus $22,917 for females. The per capita income for the town was $17,534. About 4.6% of families and 7.1% of the population were below the poverty line, including 8.9% of those under age 18 and 11.8% of those age 65 or over.

== Education ==
The local school district is Madison County Schools.

== Notable person ==
- Jim Tabor, (1916-1953) Major League 3rd Baseman, Red Sox, Phillies
- Edward Troye, painter
