= Sparkman High School =

Coordinates: 34.834°N 86.716°W

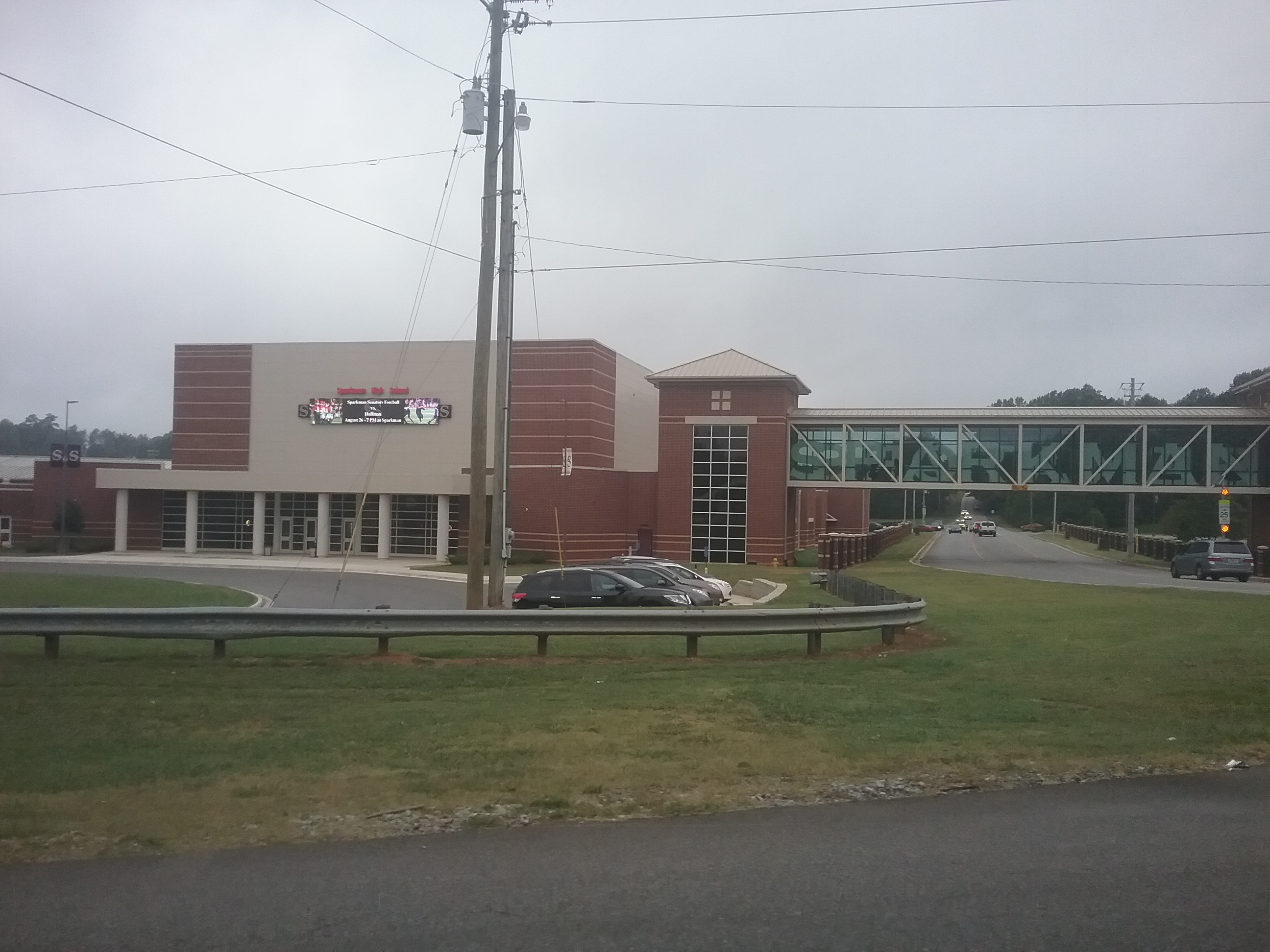
- Sparkman High School in 2022

Location
- 2616 Jeff Road; Harvest, Alabama 35749; United States

Information
- School type: Public
- Established: 1958 (68 years ago)
- CEEB code: 012648
- Principal: Todd Dreifort
- Teaching staff: 87.95 (FTE)
- Grades: 10-12
- Enrollment: 1,770 (2024-2025)
- Student to teacher ratio: 20.13
- Colors: Black and cardinal
- Nickname: Senators
- Website: sparkmanhighschool.mcssk12.org

Sparkman High School is a public high school in Harvest, Alabama, United States in the Madison County Schools district. The school was named after senator and former vice presidential nominee John Jackson Sparkman. Sparkman is one of the largest high schools in northern Alabama and serves students in grades 10-12. The school's mascot is a Senator. The school has an enrollment of around 2,400 students. Sparkman High's main rivals are Bob Jones High School and James Clemens High School.

In 2006, the Sparkman Ninth Grade School was built next to the high school.

== Campus ==
Sparkman High was originally located in Toney. The old building is now Sparkman Middle School. Now located on Jeff Road in Harvest, the current high school building was built in 1997. The facility has art rooms, two gyms, a photo studio, drama rooms, a choir room, a band room, three JROTC rooms and musical theater classes. In 2001, additional rooms were built to accommodate the overcrowding. The high school has now split; the Sparkman 9th Grade School, which is across the street from the main high school, opened in 2006 to help overcrowding. There are currently around 607 freshmen at Sparkman 9; Sparkman High has over 1,800 students at the 10-12th grade building.

== Notable alumni ==
- Adia, musician
- Caitlin Carver, actress
- Bruce Maxwell, Major League Baseball player
- Izzy Miller, musician
- Dell Pettus, NFL safety for the New England Patriots
- Caleb Ransaw, NFL cornerback for the Jacksonville Jaguars
- Dale Strong, U.S. Representative (2023–present)
- Jonathan Wallace, former professional basketball player
- Andy Whitt, Alabama State Representative (2018–present)
