= Buckhorn High School =

Coordinates: 34°52′16″N 86°27′14″W

Location
- 4123 Winchester Road; New Market, Alabama 35761; United States

Information
- School type: Public
- Established: 1958 (68 years ago)
- School district: Madison County Schools
- CEEB code: 011980
- Principal: Lavell Everett
- Faculty: 66.15 (FTE)
- Grades: 9-12
- Enrollment: 1,295 (2023–2024)
- Student to teacher ratio: 19.58
- Colors: Navy blue and gold
- Fight song: Victory March
- Athletics: AHSAA Class 6A
- Nickname: Bucks
- Rival: Hazel Green High School
- Website: www.mcssk12.org/buckhornhighschool

Buckhorn High School is a four-year public high school in New Market, Alabama, United States, north of Huntsville. It is one of five high schools in the Madison County School System. The school colors are Navy, Gold, and White, and the athletic teams are called the Bucks. Buckhorn competes in AHSAA Class 6A athletics.

Buckhorn is located at the site of the American Civil War Skirmish of Buckhorn Tavern, fought on October 12, 1863, between General Phillip D. Roddey's Alabama Cavalry Brigade and a Union cavalry brigade commanded by General Robert Mitchell.

== Recognition ==
Buckhorn has been recognized by a variety of sources as one of the best high schools in Alabama:

- U.S. News & World Report ranks Buckhorn 29th out of 391 high schools in the state of Alabama and 6th among high schools in the Huntsville area.
- The school has been featured in the Washington Post's List of America's Most Challenging High Schools (2013, 2014, 2015, 2016, 2017).
- BHS has been a Blue Ribbon Lighthouse School of Excellence (2011 & 2018).
- Buckhorn has been a U.S. Dept. of Education National Blue Ribbon School, the highest recognition a school can receive from the department (2001).
- BHS is a Blue Ribbon Point of Light School (2010).
- The school received the AP Computer Science Female Diversity Award (2024).

== History ==
By tradition, the tavern took its name "Buckhorn" in 1858 when William L. Fanning killed a buck near the site and presented its antlers to the innkeeper. The antlers are now displayed at Buckhorn High School. The Madison County Board of Education bought land on November 19, 1956, from Annie Bruce Walker Short to construct a school.

On August 29, 1958, as a result of the consolidation of New Market and Riverton High School, Buckhorn High School opened with approximately 200 students. William Loyd Fanning presented the original horns to Buckhorn High School on December 12, 1958.

To accommodate the rapid growth of New Market and the school, additions have been made over a span of 20 years, including a new library/media center, 2 gymnasiums, the Tommy R. Ledbetter stadium, a technology wing, new science classrooms and labs, a cafetorium, a music wing, a refurbished JROTC building, and the front atrium.

The school was damaged on March 2, 2012, during the tornado outbreak of March 2–3, 2012. The tornado struck the school building, damaging the science wing and a portion of the roof, then destroyed the press box at the soccer field and damaged the JROTC building. There were no reported injuries to staff or students.

Buckhorn hosts a notable athletics rivalry with fellow Madison County school Hazel Green High School. This fierce rivalry has been dubbed the “Cotton Classic” due to the significance of agriculture in the community. A trophy was made to be handed out to the winner of each football game between the two schools. As of the 2026 season, Buckhorn leads the overall series 41-23-1, with the most recent game ending with Buckhorn winning 48-22.

== Student Profile ==
Enrollment in grades 9-12 for the 2025-26 school year are 1305 students. Approximately 55.9% of students are white, 24.4% are African-American, 11.3% are Two or more races, 5.2% are American Indian/Alaska Native, 1.8% are Asian-American, and 1.2% are Hispanic/Latino. Roughly 28% of students qualify for free or reduced price lunch.

Buckhorn has a graduation rate of 94.72%. The average ACT score for Buckhorn students is 24 and the average SAT composite is 1100.

== Curriculum ==
Approximately 38% of students take one or more of the following Advanced Placement courses:

- English Language and Composition
- English Literature and Composition
- United States History
- World History: Modern
- Calculus AB
- Calculus BC
- Computer Science A
- Computer Science Principles
- Precalculus
- Psychology
- Statistics
- Biology
- Chemistry
- Physics 1
- Environmental Science

== Student Activities ==
Buckhorn High School sponsors a variety of student activities, including many nationally affiliated clubs and organizations. The following is a list of many of these:

- Archery
- Art Club
- B.A.S.S. Fishing Club
- Buckhorn Ambassadors
- Choir
- Competition Marching Band
- Dance Team
- Debate Team
- Drama Club
- Fellowship of Christian Athletes
- FCCLA
- FFA
- Football Marching Band
- Historical Society
- HOSA
- JOI Club
- JROTC
- Mountain Biking Club
- Mu Alpha Theta
- National Honor Society
- Peer Helpers
- Prom Committee
- Scholar's Bowl
- Science National Honor Society
- Spanish Club
- Student Council
- Student 2 Student
- Travel
- Yearbook

== Performing Arts ==
Buckhorn High School offers a variety of Performing Arts programs with their Bands, Drama, and Choirs.

=== Bands ===
The Buckhorn High School Marching Band has instilled a tradition of success, winning various awards and competitions, including Grand Champion Band at the inaugural Rocket City Marching Invitational in 2023. The Buckhorn Band has been a frequent finalist at the MTSU Contest of Champions competition with their productions. The Buckhorn Band made history in October 2026 when they made their Bands Of America debut at the BOA Chattanooga Regional, The band advanced into the BOA Regional Finals, marking a major milestone for the music program.

Past and Current Shows
Year	Competition Program Title	Director(s)
2011	Suenos De Espana	Jacob Souder
2012	Simple Gifts	Jacob Souder
2013	Darkness to Light	Jacob Souder
2014	Fallen	Jacob Souder
2015	American Dream	Jacob Souder
2016	Mad World	Jacob Souder
2017	Run	Jacob Souder
2018	Tick-Tock	Jacob Souder
2019	Star Beatz	Jacob Souder
2020	The Dark Side of Oz	Jacob Souder
2021	El Toro	Jacob Souder
2022	Turn	Jacob Souder
2023	Wanted	Jacob Souder
2024	Phantoms of The Opera	Jacob Souder & Kristen Daugherty
2025	Blue World	Jake House & Kristen Daugherty
2026	The Rite of "Spring"	Jake House & Kristen Daugherty

Other programs within the Buckhorn Band Organization, such as Buckhorn Indoor Percussion Ensemble, ran by Leah Farris and Chandler McCoy, also have a record of success throughout, winning multiple Southeastern Color Guard Circuit (SCGC) and Winter Guard International (WGI) Championships and Regionals. Buckhorn's Indoor Percussion has competed in various classes such as PIO with their productions "Gaia" in 2024, scoring a 89.25 at SCGC 2024 Championships and "Ssss" in 2026, scoring a 87.025 at WGI World Championships as a Finalist and being the Grand Champion of PIO in SCGC Championships. Buckhorn has also competed as a PSO in 2025 with their production "The Curse of Greenstone Manor", acquiring a score of 84.7 at WGI World Championships.

The Buckhorn Band Organization is the school's largest organization and comprises the Marching Band, Symphonic Band, Wind Ensemble, Jazz Band, Indoor Percussion Ensemble, and Winter Guards. The current Directors of Bands are Dr. Jake House and Kristen Daugherty.

=== Drama Club ===
The Buckhorn High School Drama Club offers opportunities for student involvement in theatrical productions, with meetings often held in the Blue Gym Stage. It is part of the school's various extracurricular offerings.

=== Choir ===
The Buckhorn High School Choir has earned historical accolades, becoming the first vocal ensemble from the Madison County School System to be selected to perform at the Alabama Music Educators Association (AMEA) In-service Conference in 2022. Their Chamber Choir is highly active in auditioned roles and they consistently achieve high standards in vocal performances.

== Athletics ==
=== Athletic Teams ===
Buckhorn competes in AHSAA Class 6A athletics and fields teams in the following sports:

- Baseball
- Basketball
- Bowling (discontinued)
- Cheerleading
- Cross Country
- Football
- Golf
- Indoor Track & Field
- Outdoor Track & Field
- Soccer
- Softball
- Swim
- Tennis
- Volleyball
- Wrestling

=== Facilities ===
Tommy R. Ledbetter Stadium is home to the Buckhorn Bucks football team.The field is named after the former principal of Buckhorn, who served for 29 years from 1982 to 2011. Ledbetter also coached the Buckhorn boy's basketball team for 3 years, from 1972 to 1975. He played college basketball for the North Alabama Lions men's basketball from 1969-1971, ranking as an all-time leading scorer. He was inducted into the University of North Alabama athletic Hall of Fame in 2000. The stadium was dedicated in the fall of 2010. For the 2026-2027 season, the school has added an artificial turf field, as Madison County Schools (Alabama) announced that all five high schools will be equipped with such fields. Other current athletic facilities include the auxiliary and main gymnasiums, colloquially known as the "Blue" and "Gold" Gyms, Roger Wright Field (baseball stadium), Buckhorn softball stadium, and the Buckhorn soccer stadium.

=== Cheer ===
The Buckhorn High School cheerleading program, based in New Market, Alabama, has established itself as a competitive program at both the state and national levels. Competing in Alabama High School Athletic Association (AHSAA) events and Universal Cheerleaders Association (UCA) competitions, the program has earned multiple state championships and national titles across its varsity and junior varsity teams. Among its notable accomplishments are the 2021 AHSAA Class 6A Varsity State Championship, the 2023 AHSAA Class 6A Varsity State Championship, and the 2024 AHSAA Class 6A Varsity State Championship. The junior varsity program has also achieved state-level success, winning the 2021 junior varsity and junior varsity Game Day state competitions, as well as the 2023 Junior Varsity Small State Championship. In April 2021, Buckhorn's cheerleading squad received three national championship awards at the Universal Cheerleaders Association National High School Cheerleading Championship, held at Walt Disney World in Orlando, Florida. In February 2024, the varsity squad captured the UCA Large Varsity Game Day Division II National Championship in Orlando, further adding to the program's national accomplishments. The team also earned the 2024 AHSAA Class 6A state title, finishing ahead of Athens High School. The program's achievements have received regional media coverage, including recognition from WAFF 48 following its 2021 and 2024 national championship victories. Buckhorn's cheerleading program includes separate teams supporting school athletic events and competitive cheerleading, with its coaches and athletes representing the school in state and national competitions.

=== Boy's and Girl's Basketball ===
The Buckhorn Boys' Basketball team has been frequent Area and District Champs and State qualifiers, having recently won consecutive 6A state championships in 2023 and 2024, both against Mountain Brook High School; their first state titles since 1995.

Bucks Basketball State Championships: (1960, 1991, 1995, 2023, 2024)

Bucks Basketball Final Four: (1985, 1990, 2006)

Bucks Basketball Area Championships: (1959, 1980, 1989, 1992, 1993, 1994, 2000, 2022)

Lady Bucks Basketball State Championships: (1988, 1994, 2000)

Lady Bucks Basketball Elite 8: (1985, 1991, 1992, 2001, 2002)

Lady Bucks Basketball Area Championships: (1987, 1990, 1999, 2009, 2010, 2012, 2016, 2021)

=== Baseball ===
Bucks Baseball Elite 8: (2004, 2012, 2022)

Bucks Baseball Area Champs: (1986, 2003, 2006, 2008, 2024, 2025)

=== Softball ===
Lady Bucks Softball State Championships: (2004, 2017, 2019)

Lady Bucks Softball Final Four: (2002, 2015)

Lady Bucks Softball Elite 8: (1994, 1999, 2001, 2005, 2018)

Lady Bucks Softball Area Champs: (2000, 2016, 2023, 2024)

=== Volleyball ===
Lady Bucks Volleyball Final Four: (2003, 2026)

Lady Bucks Volleyball Elite 8: (2004, 2019, 2021, 2024)

Lady Bucks Volleyball Area Championships: (2001, 2002, 2005, 2006)

=== Bowling ===
Buckhorn Bowling State Championships: (2018)

=== Football ===
Buckhorn Football State Runner-Up: (2005)

== Notable alumni ==
- Khari Blasingame (2014), running back for the Philadelphia Eagles.
- Anton "Bubba" Keller, Jr., Madison County Sports Hall of Fame Member; winner of a gold medal, silver medal, and two bronze medals at the 1995 Special Olympics World Summer Games.
- Holly Halcomb (2010), Female Vocalist of The Springs (band)
- Kyle Wright (2014), baseball player, first-round selection in 2017 MLB draft; 2021 World Series Champion. Currently Playing for the Kansas City Royals.
- Karen Miga (1996), scientist, one of Time 100's most influential people in 2022, known for her work on the Telomere-to-Telomere Project.
- Denver Jones (2020), former Auburn Tigers men's basketball team guard
- Janelle Odionu (2014 - transferred), former Cornell Big Red women's basketball center
- Lillian Claire (2020), fashion influencer, with over 3 million followers across platforms
- Caleb Holt (2026 - transferred), college basketball guard for the Arizona Wildcats men's basketball team of the Big 12 Conference, highest-ranked player to ever come out of the state of Alabama
