= Jordan Beck (baseball) =

American baseball player (born 2001)

Colorado Rockies – No. 27
- Outfielder
- Born: April 19, 2001 (age 25); Hazel Green, Alabama, U.S.
- Bats: Right Throws: Right

MLB debut
- April 30, 2024, for the Colorado Rockies

MLB statistics (through 2026 season)
- Batting average: .233
- Home runs: 20
- Runs batted in: 77
- Stats at Baseball Reference

Teams
- Colorado Rockies (2024–present)

Jordan Alexander Beck (born April 19, 2001) is an American professional baseball outfielder for the Colorado Rockies of Major League Baseball (MLB). He played college baseball for the Tennessee Volunteers. Beck made his MLB debut in 2024.

== Early life and amateur career ==
Beck grew up in Hazel Green, Alabama and attended Hazel Green High School, where he played baseball and basketball. He helped the Trojans to win the 2018 state championship in baseball and also helped the Trojans to the final four in basketball. He was a basketball teammate of Kira Lewis Jr. As a senior, Beck batted .500 with 13 home runs, 16 doubles, 52 hits, and 52 RBIs and was named an ABCA/Rawlings High School All-American.

Beck was selected in the 14th round of the 2019 MLB draft by the Boston Red Sox but did not sign with the team.

He opted to attend the University of Tennessee where he played baseball and batted .275 with five doubles, one home run, and nine RBIs through 10 games during his freshman season before it was cut short due to the coronavirus pandemic.

As a sophomore, he hit for a .271 average with 16 doubles, 15 home runs and 64 RBIs. After the 2021 season, Beck played collegiate summer baseball for the Harwich Mariners of the Cape Cod Baseball League.

Beck was named to the watchlist for the Golden Spikes Award entering his junior season in 2022. He hit .298 with 18 home runs and 61 RBI. He also earned attention on June 6, when making an obscene gesture at Georgia Tech fans while running the bases on a game-tying double at the NCAA Knoxville Super Regional final.

== Professional career ==
=== Draft and minors (2022–2024) ===
The Colorado Rockies selected Beck 38th overall in the 2022 Major League Baseball draft. He signed with the team on July 28 and received a $2.2 million signing bonus. He played for the Arizona Complex League Rockies and Fresno Grizzlies that summer, hitting .296.

In 2023, Beck won the Northwest League Most Valuable Player Award with the High-A Spokane Indians. He was promoted to the Double-A Hartford Yard Goats on July 14. In 126 games for Spokane and thehe hit .271/.364/.503 with 25 home runs, 91 RBI, and 20 stolen bases.

Beck began the 2024 season with the Triple-A Albuquerque Isotopes. In 25 games, he hit .307/.405/.594 with 5 home runs, 28 RBI, and 5 stolen bases.

=== Majors (2024–present) ===
On April 30, 2024, Beck was selected to the 40-man roster and promoted to the major leagues for the first time. He made his MLB debut later that day, batting 2-for-4. On May 15, against the San Diego Padres, Beck hit his first career home run.

When diving for a catch during the first inning of a game against the Philadelphia Phillies on May 15, Beck suffered a left-hand fracture (fourth metacarpal). He was on the injured list for almost three months, returning on August 13. Prior to the injury, he slashed .190/.198/.317 (20 wRC+). After he returned, that number was .187/.282/.242 (40 wRC+), with his on-base percentage improving as his slugging percentage dropped. Beck finished the 2024 season slashing .188/.245/.276 with three home runs.

He began the 2025 season in the starting lineup, but struggled in the early going and was sent down to Triple-A. Beck found his swing after being recalled to the Rockies in late April, belting five home runs in a three-game span. He is one of only six Rockies players to ever achieve the feat. His offensive performance peaked on April 29, when he had a 1.022 OPS. He cooled off, batting .258/.317/.416 with 16 home runs and a team-leading 19 steals for the worst team in the majors.

== Personal life ==
Beck was married in December 2025. He and his wife had been together for 11 years. They have a pet beagle.

Beck has three younger sisters.
