= Gurley, Alabama =

- Town
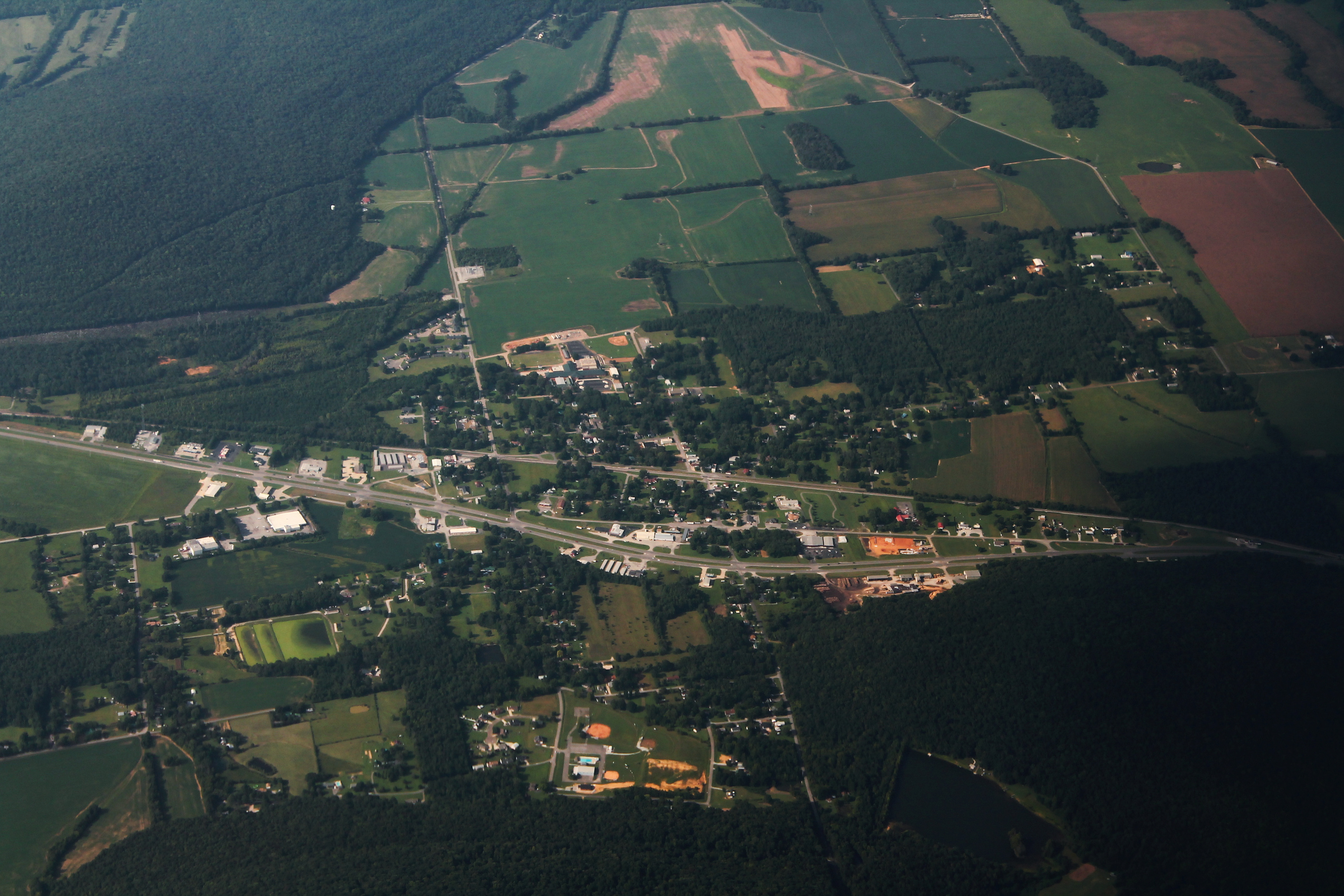
- Aerial view of Gurley

- Flag Seal

- Location of Gurley in Madison County, Alabama.
- Coordinates: 34°41′50″N 86°22′35″W
- Country: United States
- State: Alabama
- County: Madison
- Established: 1891

Area
  - Total: 3.55 sq mi (9.20 km^{2})
  - Land: 3.55 sq mi (9.19 km^{2})
  - Water: 0 sq mi (0.00 km^{2})
- Elevation: 620 ft (190 m)

Population (2020)
  - Total: 816
  - Density: 229.9/sq mi (88.75/km^{2})
- Time zone: UTC-6 (Central (CST))
  - Summer (DST): UTC-5 (CDT)
- ZIP code: 35748
- Area code: 256
- FIPS code: 01-32440
- GNIS feature ID: 2406631
- Website: www.townofgurleyal.com

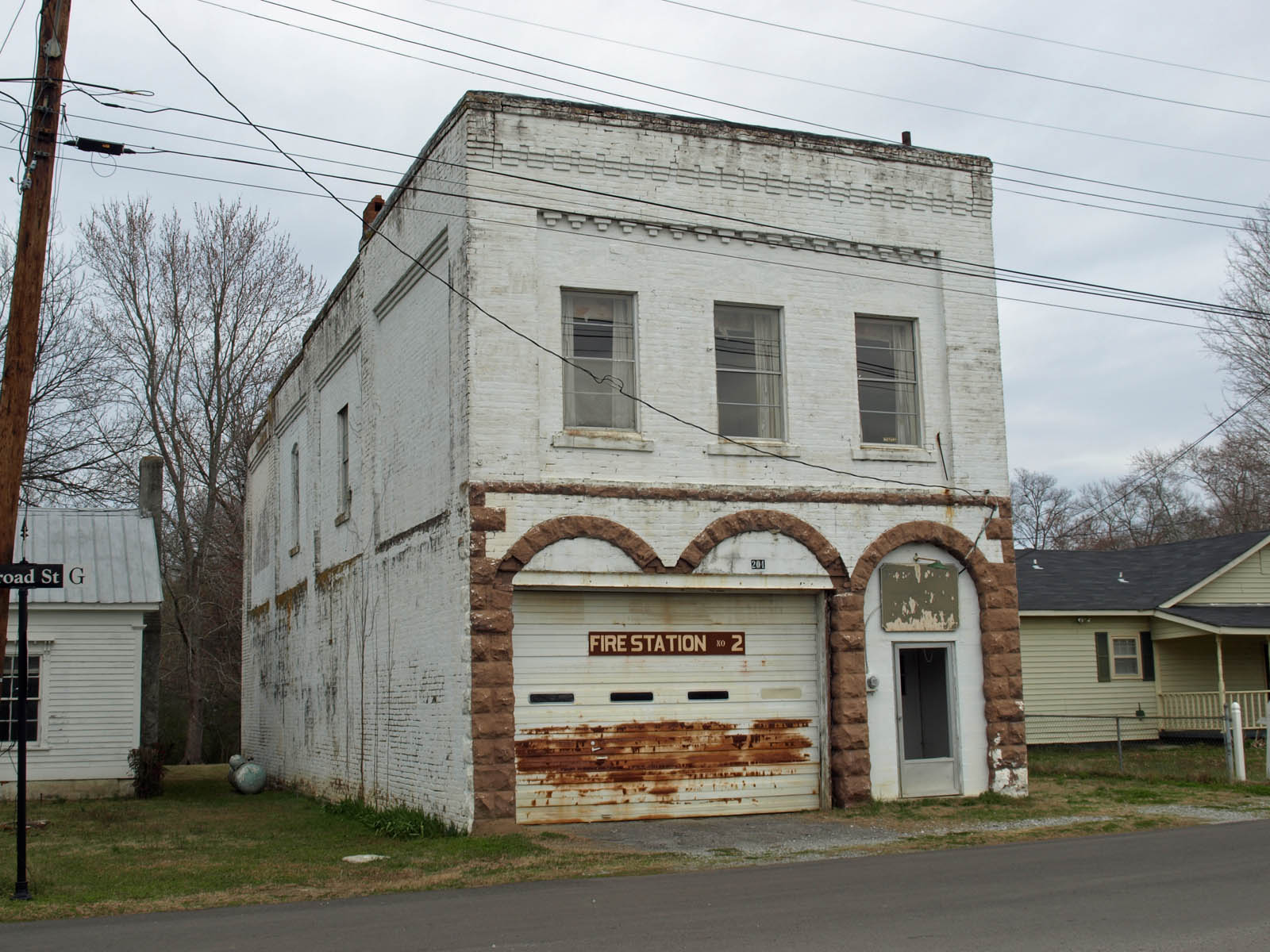
The Old Gurley Town Hall is a contributing property to the Gurley Historic District which was added to the National Register of Historic Places on June 2, 2004.

Gurley is a town in Madison County, Alabama, United States, and is included in the Huntsville-Decatur Combined Statistical Area. As of the 2020 census, the population of the town was 816.

== History ==
The community takes its name from the Gurley family, who settled in the area in 1817. The town gradually formed around a water and coaling stop of the Memphis & Charleston Railroad and was originally known as "Gurley's Tank". In 1866, the post office opened, and the name was changed to "Gurleysville"; it was later shortened back to Gurley. Gurley was incorporated in 1891 with 250 residents. Soon after, the population peaked at 1,000. The business district was nearly completely destroyed by fire in 1923, when a bucket brigade was able to save only two businesses. Most of the town is now included in the Gurley Historic District, which was listed on the National Register of Historic Places in 2004.

== Geography ==
Gurley is located in eastern Madison County along U.S. Route 72. Huntsville is 16 miles (26 km) to the west, and Scottsboro is 26 miles (42 km) to the east.

According to the U.S. Census Bureau, Gurley has a total area of 3.6 square miles (9.2 km^{2}), all land.

== Demographics ==
Historical population
| Census | Pop. | Note | %± |
|---|---|---|---|
| 1890 | 570 | | — |
| 1900 | 831 | | 45.8% |
| 1910 | 750 | | −9.7% |
| 1920 | 727 | | −3.1% |
| 1930 | 581 | | −20.1% |
| 1970 | 647 | | — |
| 1980 | 735 | | 13.6% |
| 1990 | 1,007 | | 37.0% |
| 2000 | 876 | | −13.0% |
| 2010 | 801 | | −8.6% |
| 2020 | 816 | | 1.9% |
| 2024 (est.) | 833 | ▲ | 2.1% |
U.S. Decennial Census; 2013 Estimate

Note: From the 1940 Census until 1970, Gurley ceased to appear on the census rolls. This was likely due to either disincorporation or loss/lapse of its charter in the 1930s. At some point in the 1960s, it was reincorporated. Gurley had an estimated population of 833 people in 2024.

=== Racial and ethnic composition ===
Gurley town, Alabama – Racial and ethnic composition Note: the US Census treats Hispanic/Latino as an ethnic category. This table excludes Latinos from the racial categories and assigns them to a separate category. Hispanics/Latinos may be of any race. Race and ethnicity were not reported in Alabama for populations under 2,500 in 1980 and under 1,000 in 1990.
| Race / Ethnicity (NH = Non-Hispanic) | Pop 1990 | Pop 2000 | Pop 2010 | Pop 2020 | % 1990 | % 2000 | % 2010 | % 2020 |
|---|---|---|---|---|---|---|---|---|
| White alone (NH) | 844 | 704 | 597 | 636 | 83.81% | 80.37% | 74.53% | 77.94% |
| Black or African American alone (NH) | 150 | 135 | 137 | 71 | 14.90% | 15.41% | 17.10% | 8.70% |
| Native American or Alaska Native alone (NH) | 0 | 4 | 12 | 9 | 0.00% | 0.46% | 1.50% | 1.10% |
| Asian alone (NH) | 0 | 3 | 9 | 8 | 0.00% | 0.34% | 1.12% | 0.98% |
| Native Hawaiian or Pacific Islander alone (NH) | x | 0 | 0 | 0 | x | 0.00% | 0.00% | 0.00% |
| Other race alone (NH) | 0 | 0 | 3 | 6 | 0.00% | 0.00% | 0.37% | 0.74% |
| Mixed race or Multiracial (NH) | x | 12 | 15 | 70 | x | 1.37% | 1.87% | 8.58% |
| Hispanic or Latino (any race) | 12 | 18 | 28 | 16 | 1.19% | 2.05% | 3.50% | 1.96% |
| Total | 1,007 | 876 | 801 | 816 | 100.00% | 100.00% | 100.00% | 100.00% |

=== 2020 census ===
As of the 2020 United States census, there were 816 people, 253 households, and 153 families residing in the town.

=== 2000 census ===
As of the census of 2000, there were 876 people, 346 households, and 241 families residing in the town. The population density was 313.9 inhabitants per square mile (121.2/km^{2}). There were 379 housing units at an average density of 135.8 per square mile (52.4/km^{2}). The racial makeup of the town was 81.85% White, 15.41% Black or African American, 0.46% Native American, 0.34% Asian, 0.57% from other races, and 1.37% from two or more races. 2.05% of the population were Hispanic or Latino of any race.

There were 346 households, out of which 34.7% had children under the age of 18 living with them, 48.0% were married couples living together, 17.9% had a female householder with no husband present, and 30.1% were non-families. 26.9% of all households were made up of individuals, and 13.0% had someone living alone who was 65 years of age or older. The average household size was 2.53 and the average family size was 3.09.

In the town, the population was spread out, with 28.5% under the age of 18, 7.8% from 18 to 24, 27.1% from 25 to 44, 21.3% from 45 to 64, and 15.3% who were 65 years of age or older. The median age was 35 years. For every 100 females, there were 86.8 males. For every 100 females age 18 and over, there were 85.8 males.

The median income for a household in the town was $23,831, and the median income for a family was $26,875. Males had a median income of $31,146 versus $20,000 for females. The per capita income for the town was $13,271. About 23.4% of families and 21.4% of the population were below the poverty line, including 28.3% of those under age 18 and 31.1% of those age 65 or over.

== Public services ==
As an incorporated town, Gurley has its own police and fire departments. The city also maintains a small sewer system.

== Education ==
Education in Gurley is run by the Madison County School System. Only one K–8 school (Madison County Elementary) operates within the city limits, in the building formerly occupied by Madison County High School. A new Madison County High School was built a few miles west of the town on US 72 in 1999.

== Fraternal ==
Gurley has its own Masonic Lodge (Gurley Lodge #521 F & AM), a Lions Club, a Lioness Club, and a Founders Club.

== Notable people ==
- Graham Ashcraft, professional baseball player
- Jordan Chunn, professional football player
- Clement Claiborne Clay, United States senator and Confederate States senator
- Lena Styles, professional baseball player
