= Jordan Chunn =

American football player (born 1995)

Profile
- Position: Running back

Personal information
- Born: January 2, 1995 (age 31); Gurley, Alabama
- Listed height: 6 ft 0 in (1.83 m)
- Listed weight: 230 lb (104 kg)

Career information
- High school: Madison County (AL)
- College: Troy
- NFL draft: 2018: undrafted

Career history
- Dallas Cowboys (2018–2019); New York Giants (2021)*; Birmingham Stallions (2022)
- * Offseason or practice squad member only

Awards and highlights
- Second-team All-Sun Belt (2017); First-team All-Sun Belt (2016); CFN Freshman All-America (2013); NCAA Freshman Rushing Touchdown Leader (2013)
- Stats at Pro Football Reference

Jordan Chunn (born January 2, 1995) is an American football running back. He played college football at Troy University. He has been a member of the Dallas Cowboys and New York Giants of the National Football League (NFL) and Birmingham Stallions of the United States Football League (USFL).

== Early life ==
Chunn attended Madison County High School. As a senior, he helped the school have its best season in football, after winning 12 games, obtaining a number 3 ranking and its first ever appearance in the state semifinals.

He was a two-way player at running back and defensive back, registering 2,229 rushing yards, 43 touchdowns, 155 tackles, 4 sacks and 4 interceptions. He was named Offensive Player of the Year by the Huntsville Times and the Alabama 4A Back of the Year at the end of the season.

== College career ==
Chunn accepted a football scholarship from Troy University. As a true freshman, although he was a reserve player behind Brandon Burks, he saw considerable action, registering 128 carries for 514 yards (4-yard avg.) and 21 receptions for 104 yards. His 14 rushing touchdowns led the team, were second in the conference, set a freshman school record, and were third most in school history. He had 22 carries for 91 yards against Georgia State University. His teammates nicknamed him MegaChunn.

As a sophomore, he was a reserve player, tallying 111 carries (led the team) for 509 yards (4.6-yard avg.) and 6 rushing touchdowns. He had 28 carries for 189 yards against the University of Idaho.

As a junior in 2015, he was a reserve player behind Burks. A tackle in the second game against Charleston Southern University shattered his right collarbone and was forced to be medical redshirted.

As redshirt junior in 2016, he was named the starter and had a breakout season, posting 279 carries (school record) for 1,288 yards (second in school history and led the conference), a 4.6-yard average, 16 rushing touchdowns (second in school history) and 1,516 all-purpose yards (eighth in school history). He had 161 rushing yards against Austin Peay State University. He collected 176 yards and one touchdown against the University of Southern Mississippi.

As a senior, he remained the starter at running back, but shared more snaps with Josh Anderson. He missed 2 games with a knee injury that he suffered in the twelfth game against Arkansas State University, including the 2017 New Orleans Bowl. He led the team with 154 carries for 774 yards (5-yard avg.) and 10 rushing touchdowns. He had 191 rushing yards and one touchdown against Louisiana State University, helping the team to a 24–21 upset win.

He finished his college career with 679 carries for 3,124 yards (4.6-yard avg.), 47 rushing touchdowns (school record) and 84 receptions for 558 yards.

College football career statistics
		Rushing					Receiving		
Year	Team	Att	Yds	Avg	Lng	TD	Rec	Yds	TD
2013	Troy	128	514	4.0	-	14	21	104	0
2014	Troy	111	509	4.6	-	6	4	20	0
2015	Troy	7	39	5.6	-	1	1	2	0
2016	Troy	279	1,288	4.6	-	16	30	228	0
2017	Troy	154	774	5.0	-	10	28	204	0
Career		679	3,124	4.6	-	47	84	558	0

== Professional career ==
=== Dallas Cowboys ===
Chunn was signed by the Dallas Cowboys as an undrafted free agent after the 2018 NFL draft on April 30. He was waived on September 1 and signed to the practice squad the next day. He signed a reserve/future contract with the Cowboys on January 14, 2019.

On August 31, 2019, Chunn was waived by the Cowboys, but was re-signed to the active roster two days later. He was waived again on September 10, 2019, and re-signed to the practice squad. On December 30, 2019, Chunn was signed to a reserve/future contract. He was waived with a non-football injury designation on July 28, 2020.

=== New York Giants ===
On January 5, 2021, Chunn signed a reserve/future contract with the New York Giants. He was waived on May 16, 2021.

=== Birmingham Stallions ===
On March 10, 2022, Chunn was drafted by the Birmingham Stallions of the United States Football League. After being ruled out for week 1 with a hamstring injury, he was transferred to the team's practice squad on April 14, 2022. He remained on the inactive roster on April 22 with the injury. He was moved to the active roster on May 6, and he was released on May 10.
