= Hazel Green, Alabama =

- Census-designated place
- Location in Madison County and the state of Alabama
- Coordinates: 34°55′25″N 86°34′01″W
- Country: United States
- State: Alabama
- County: Madison

Area
  - Total: 10.05 sq mi (26.02 km^{2})
  - Land: 10.03 sq mi (25.98 km^{2})
  - Water: 0.015 sq mi (0.04 km^{2})
- Elevation: 784 ft (239 m)

Population (2020)
  - Total: 4,105
  - Density: 409.2/sq mi (157.98/km^{2})
- Time zone: UTC-5 (Central (CST))
  - Summer (DST): UTC-5 (CDT)
- ZIP code: 35750
- Area code: 256
- FIPS code: 01-33808
- GNIS feature ID: 2402573

Hazel Green is an unincorporated community and census-designated place (CDP) in north central Madison County, Alabama, United States, and is included in the Huntsville-Decatur Combined Statistical Area. As of the 2020 census, the population of the community was 4,105, up from 3,630 at the 2010 census.

== History ==
=== Early settlement ===
The area now known as Hazel Green was settled during the early nineteenth century, following the opening of Madison County to American settlement. Madison County was established in 1808 as part of the Mississippi Territory and attracted settlers from Tennessee, Georgia, Virginia, and the Carolinas. The fertile agricultural land and availability of watercourses made northern Madison County attractive for farming and milling.

The origins of the name Hazel Green are uncertain. One explanation attributes it to the greenery surrounding hazelnut bushes in the area, while another local tradition holds that the settlement was named after the wife of an early merchant and postmaster. The greenery explanation is recorded in a historical account of Madison County.

By the early 1810s, Hazel Green had developed around the intersection of several important transportation routes, including the Huntsville–Nashville Road and the Winchester–Athens Road. The convergence of these routes made the settlement a stopping point for travelers and a local trading center. Historical accounts describe two inns, several stores, and groceries operating in the community during its early years.

In 1815, Thomas McGehee established a large mill approximately two miles north of Hazel Green. Between 1815 and 1817, Charles Cabaniss established Madison County's first cotton-spinning factory on his farm northeast of the settlement. The factory exchanged its manufactured thread for raw cotton, providing an early example of textile manufacturing in the region.

A post office was established in Hazel Green in 1819, with Robert Erwin serving as its first recorded postmaster. A school was also operating by that year. A February 1819 newspaper advertisement identified Silas Webb as a teacher and Robert Irwin, Samuel Allen, and Richard Cottrell as trustees.

Religious and fraternal organizations also developed in the surrounding community. A Methodist society was organized at McGehee's Mill by 1816. Washington Lodge No. 23, a Masonic lodge, was organized in Hazel Green in 1821 and received its charter under the Grand Lodge of Tennessee.

=== Incorporation and early prosperity ===
On June 15, 1821, the Alabama General Assembly passed legislation incorporating Hazel Green as a town. The act established its boundaries along the Meridian Road, beginning near Robert Irwin's store and extending north for half a mile, encompassing a quarter-mile on either side of the road. It provided for five elected trustees and established municipal authority over streets and local affairs.

Later historical accounts estimated that approximately 300 to 400 people lived within the town during its early period of prosperity.

The community's economy was closely associated with cotton cultivation and plantation agriculture. Wealthy landowners acquired substantial tracts of fertile farmland surrounding the settlement. Enslaved African Americans provided much of the labor supporting the region's agricultural economy. As larger landholdings expanded, smaller farms and local commercial establishments gradually declined.

On January 20, 1830, the Alabama legislature repealed the act incorporating Hazel Green, ending its status as an incorporated municipality. The settlement nevertheless continued as a rural agricultural community.

=== Nineteenth-century development ===
Following the repeal of its incorporation, Hazel Green remained an identifiable agricultural community. The local post office continued operating throughout much of the nineteenth century, with records documenting successive postmasters from 1819 onward.

The Round Mound Inn, constructed in 1847 approximately one mile east of Hazel Green, served travelers passing through the area. The building remained a local landmark until it was destroyed by fire in 1968.

Hazel Green United Methodist Church records its establishment in 1886, becoming an enduring religious institution in the community.

=== Twentieth century and modern development ===
During the early twentieth century, Hazel Green remained predominantly rural, with farming and locally owned businesses serving the surrounding population. Recollections of residents who lived in the community during the 1930s and 1940s describe a crossroads containing several small stores, a larger general merchandise store, a cotton gin, and a church.

The development of automobile transportation brought significant changes to Hazel Green. The Huntsville–Nashville route evolved into a major paved highway, eventually becoming part of U.S. Route 231/431. Improvements to the highway increased accessibility between Hazel Green, Huntsville, and communities in Tennessee.

Hazel Green first appeared as a census-designated place in the 1980 United States census, with a population of 1,503. Subsequent residential development and population growth increasingly connected the community to the expanding Huntsville metropolitan area. In recent decades, portions of the surrounding agricultural landscape have been replaced by residential subdivisions, apartment complexes, restaurants, and retail businesses, particularly along U.S. Route 231/431.

== Geography ==
Hazel Green is located in northern Madison County. It is 15 miles (24 km) north of Huntsville and the same distance south of Fayetteville, Tennessee. Hazel Green is bordered to the south by Meridianville and to the southeast by Moores Mill.

According to the U.S. Census Bureau, the Hazel Green CDP has a total area of 10.0 square miles (26.0 km^{2}), of which 0.02 square miles (0.04 km^{2}), or 0.13%, are water. The Flint River, a south-flowing tributary of the Tennessee River, runs along the northeast edge of the community.

=== Major roads ===
- U.S. Route 231
- U.S. Route 431

== Demographics ==
Historical population
| Census | Pop. | Note | %± |
|---|---|---|---|
| 1980 | 1,503 | | — |
| 1990 | 2,208 | | 46.9% |
| 2000 | 3,805 | | 72.3% |
| 2010 | 3,630 | | −4.6% |
| 2020 | 4,105 | | 13.1% |
U.S. Decennial Census

Hazel Green first appeared as a census designated place in the 1980 U.S. Census.

=== Racial and ethnic composition ===
Hazel Green CDP, Alabama – Racial and ethnic composition Note: the US Census treats Hispanic/Latino as an ethnic category. This table excludes Latinos from the racial categories and assigns them to a separate category. Hispanics/Latinos may be of any race. Race and ethnicity were not reported in Alabama for populations under 2,500 in 1980 and under 1,000 in 1990.
| Race / Ethnicity (NH = Non-Hispanic) | Pop 1990 | Pop 2000 | Pop 2010 | Pop 2020 | % 1990 | % 2000 | % 2010 | % 2020 |
|---|---|---|---|---|---|---|---|---|
| White alone (NH) | 2,160 | 3,508 | 3,198 | 3,083 | 97.83% | 92.19% | 60.56% | 52.32% |
| Black or African American alone (NH) | 15 | 101 | 1,671 | 1,916 | 0.68% | 2.65% | 31.64% | 32.51% |
| Native American or Alaska Native alone (NH) | 26 | 44 | 28 | 25 | 1.18% | 1.16% | 0.53% | 0.42% |
| Asian alone (NH) | 1 | 19 | 63 | 64 | 0.05% | 0.50% | 1.19% | 1.09% |
| Native Hawaiian or Pacific Islander alone (NH) | x | 1 | 3 | 4 | x | 0.03% | 0.06% | 0.07% |
| Other race alone (NH) | 0 | 4 | 7 | 42 | 0.00% | 0.11% | 0.13% | 0.71% |
| Mixed race or Multiracial (NH) | x | 61 | 148 | 391 | x | 1.60% | 2.80% | 6.63% |
| Hispanic or Latino (any race) | 6 | 67 | 163 | 368 | 0.27% | 1.76% | 3.09% | 6.24% |
| Total | 2,208 | 3,805 | 5,281 | 5,893 | 100.00% | 100.00% | 100.00% | 100.00% |

=== 2020 census ===
As of the 2020 census, Hazel Green had a population of 4,105. The median age was 40.0 years. 23.1% of residents were under the age of 18 and 15.0% were 65 years of age or older. For every 100 females, there were 94.6 males, and for every 100 females age 18 and over, there were 92.5 males age 18 and over.

0.0% of residents lived in urban areas, while 100.0% lived in rural areas.

There were 1,596 households and 1,155 families in Hazel Green, and 32.8% of households had children under the age of 18 living in them. Of all households, 53.3% were married-couple households, 17.0% were households with a male householder and no spouse or partner present, and 23.1% were households with a female householder and no spouse or partner present. About 23.0% of all households were made up of individuals, and 7.5% had someone living alone who was 65 years of age or older.

There were 1,656 housing units, of which 3.6% were vacant. The homeowner vacancy rate was 0.5% and the rental vacancy rate was 5.9%.

=== 2010 census ===
As of the census of 2010, there were 3,630 people, 1,338 households, and 1,017 families residing in the community. The population density was 363 inhabitants per square mile (140/km^{2}). There were 1,434 housing units at an average density of 143.4 per square mile (55.4/km^{2}). The racial makeup of the community was 88.9% White, 5.9% Black or African American, 1.5% Native American, 0.4% Asian, 0.1% Pacific Islander, 0.7% from other races, and 2.4% from two or more races. 2.3% of the population were Hispanic or Latino of any race.

There were 1,338 households out of which 34.8% had children under the age of 18 living with them, 60.5% were married couples living together, 10.6% had a female householder with no husband present, and 24.0% were non-families. 20.3% of all households were made up of individuals, and 6.2% had someone living alone who was 65 years of age or older. The average household size was 2.69 and the average family size was 3.11.

In the community, the population was spread out, with 26.2% under the age of 18, 7.9% from 18 to 24, 27.9% from 25 to 44, 27.5% from 45 to 64, and 10.5% who were 65 years of age or older. The median age was 37.5 years. For every 100 females, there were 96.5 males. For every 100 females age 18 and over, there were 98.4 males.

The median income for a household in the community was $48,822, and the median income for a family was $60,588. Males had a median income of $42,981 versus $30,990 for females. The per capita income for the community was $23,693. About 10.8% of families and 13.6% of the population were below the poverty line, including 16.4% of those under age 18 and 7.4% of those age 65 or over.

=== 2000 census ===
As of the census of 2000, there were 3,805 people, 1,340 households, and 1,080 families residing in the community. The population density was 378.9 inhabitants per square mile (146.3/km^{2}). There were 1,394 housing units at an average density of 138.8 per square mile (53.6/km^{2}). The racial makeup of the community was 93.56% White, 2.65% Black or African American, 1.31% Native American, 0.50% Asian, 0.03% Pacific Islander, 0.32% from other races, and 1.63% from two or more races. 1.76% of the population were Hispanic or Latino of any race.

There were 1,340 households out of which 46.1% had children under the age of 18 living with them, 66.1% were married couples living together, 10.6% had a female householder with no husband present, and 19.4% were non-families. 17.2% of all households were made up of individuals, and 4.9% had someone living alone who was 65 years of age or older. The average household size was 2.82 and the average family size was 3.18.

In the community, the population was spread out, with 31.3% under the age of 18, 7.1% from 18 to 24, 35.3% from 25 to 44, 18.7% from 45 to 64, and 7.7% who were 65 years of age or older. The median age was 33 years. For every 100 females, there were 98.1 males. For every 100 females age 18 and over, there were 95.4 males. The median income for a household in the community was $40,263, and the median income for a family was $45,174. Males had a median income of $33,005 versus $23,929 for females. The per capita income for the community was $18,397. About 4.2% of families and 6.3% of the population were below the poverty line, including 4.8% of those under age 18 and 12.5% of those age 65 or over.

== Public services ==
The Madison County Sheriff's Department administers law and order in Hazel Green.

The Hazel Green Fire/Rescue is a large volunteer fire department of approximately 40 members serving the residents of North Central Madison County. The fire department has 3 stations. The stations are located throughout the district in strategic locations. Station one, which houses the majority of all of the main rescue, EMS and firefighting equipment, is located at the intersection of Joe Quick Road and Highway 231-431N. Station two is located on Greenville Pike and Station three on Hill Chapel Road. Hazel Green Fire/Rescue outfits an apparatus of five engines, one attack truck (or "brush" truck), one rescue truck and two medical response vehicles. Hazel Green has a dedicated roster of individuals who hold credentials from firefighter I level, to FF 2, state licensed and nationally registered Emergency Medical Technicians (EMTs) and certified technical rescue personnel (vehicle, water and other special rescue missions).

== Education ==
The local school district is Madison County Schools.

The Madison County School System currently runs three schools in Hazel Green. Kindergarten through third grade students attend Hazel Green Elementary School, Lynn Fanning Elementary, and Walnut Grove School. Fourth through sixth grade students attend Moores Mill Intermediate School. Seventh and eighth grade students in Hazel Green attend Meridianville Middle School located in Hazel Green. Hazel Green High School serves as a high school for ninth through twelfth grade students in Hazel Green, Meridianville, and parts of New Market and northern Huntsville. In September 2022, the Madison County School System announced the proposal of the construction of another school in Hazel Green by the 2024-2025 school years to accommodate new growth, and to prevent overcrowding in Hazel Green's existing schools. The size, location, and grades to be housed in the proposed school have yet to be announced.

The Huntsville Madison County Public Library maintains a branch, the Tillman D. Hill Public Library, located on Knowledge Drive. This branch library is part of the community library system in Madison County.

== Notable people ==
- Jordan Beck, professional baseball player for the Colorado Rockies
- Kira Lewis Jr., professional basketball player for the Utah Jazz
- George Lindsey, actor who portrayed Goober Pyle on The Andy Griffith Show and Hee-Haw
- Claire Lynch, bluegrass singer
