= Meridianville, Alabama =

- Census-designated place
- Location in Madison County and the state of Alabama
- Coordinates: 34°52′39″N 86°34′22″W
- Country: United States
- State: Alabama
- County: Madison

Area
  - Total: 15.61 sq mi (40.42 km^{2})
  - Land: 15.56 sq mi (40.29 km^{2})
  - Water: 0.050 sq mi (0.13 km^{2})
- Elevation: 781 ft (238 m)

Population (2020)
  - Total: 8,209
  - Density: 527.7/sq mi (203.74/km^{2})
- Time zone: UTC-6 (Central (CST))
  - Summer (DST): UTC-5 (CDT)
- ZIP code: 35759
- Area code: 256
- FIPS code: 01-48112
- GNIS feature ID: 2403279

Meridianville is an unincorporated community and census-designated place (CDP) in Madison County, Alabama, United States, and is included in the Huntsville–Decatur combined statistical area. As of the 2020 census, the population of the CDP was 8,209.

== History ==
The community of Meridianville was established in the early 1800s by a settler named Joseph Fenwick along the major north–south road from Nashville to Huntsville, now known as U.S. Route 231/431, deriving its name from being placed on the line of the base meridian. This village site first attracted squatters and small farmers, however, when Fenwick recognized the possibilities of a town, he purchased land, and offered lots for sale in 1818. Within the first decade of settlement, the bustling village of Meridianville offered several mills, gins, and stores.

== Geography ==
Meridianville is located in northern Madison County. It is north of Huntsville and east of Harvest and is bordered by Hazel Green to the north and Moores Mill to the east.

According to the U.S. Census Bureau, the Meridianville CDP has a total area of 15.6 square miles (40 km^{2}), of which 15.5 square miles (40 km^{2}) are land and 0.1 square miles (0.26 km^{2}), or 0.31%, are water.

== Education ==
Meridianville is served by the following public schools:

- Lynn Fanning Elementary (grades K-3)
- Moores Mill Intermediate School (3–5 as of the 2023–2024 school year)
- Meridianville Middle School (6–8 as of the 2023–2024 school year)
- Hazel Green High School (9–12)

== Demographics ==
Historical population
Census	Pop.	Note	%±
1880	105		—
1980	1,403		—
1990	2,852		103.3%
2000	4,117		44.4%
2010	6,021		46.2%
2020	8,209		36.3%
2024 (est.)	11,526	▲	40.4%
U.S. Decennial Census

Meridianville first appeared on the 1880 U.S. Census as an unincorporated community of 105 residents. It did not appear again on the census for a century (1980), when it was designated a census designated place (CDP). The population was 11,526 in 2024, making it the second fastest growing place in Madison county after Triana.

=== Racial and ethnic composition ===
Meridianville CDP, Alabama – Racial and ethnic composition Note: the US Census treats Hispanic/Latino as an ethnic category. This table excludes Latinos from the racial categories and assigns them to a separate category. Hispanics/Latinos may be of any race.
Race / Ethnicity (NH = Non-Hispanic)	Pop 2000	Pop 2010	Pop 2020	% 2000	% 2010	% 2020
White alone (NH)	3,550	4,501	5,114	86.23%	74.76%	62.30%
Black or African American alone (NH)	385	1,094	2,051	9.35%	18.17%	24.98%
Native American or Alaska Native alone (NH)	44	39	57	1.07%	0.65%	0.69%
Asian alone (NH)	30	98	131	0.73%	1.63%	1.60%
Native Hawaiian or Pacific Islander alone (NH)	2	10	11	0.05%	0.17%	0.13%
Other race alone (NH)	4	3	38	0.10%	0.05%	0.46%
Mixed race or Multiracial (NH)	73	112	457	1.77%	1.86%	5.57%
Hispanic or Latino (any race)	29	164	350	0.70%	2.72%	4.26%
Total	4,117	6,021	8,209	100.00%	100.00%	100.00%

=== 2020 census ===
As of the 2020 census, Meridianville had a population of 8,209. The median age was 39.5 years. 24.4% of residents were under the age of 18 and 15.5% of residents were 65 years of age or older. For every 100 females there were 89.8 males, and for every 100 females age 18 and over there were 87.3 males age 18 and over.

77.3% of residents lived in urban areas, while 22.7% lived in rural areas.

There were 3,044 households in Meridianville, including 2,020 families. Of all households, 34.3% had children under the age of 18 living in them, 60.7% were married-couple households, 12.6% were households with a male householder and no spouse or partner present, and 23.0% were households with a female householder and no spouse or partner present. About 20.1% of all households were made up of individuals, and 8.2% had someone living alone who was 65 years of age or older.

There were 3,150 housing units, of which 3.4% were vacant. The homeowner vacancy rate was 0.8% and the rental vacancy rate was 7.6%.

=== 2010 census ===
As of the census of 2010, there were 6,021 people, 2,248 households, and 1,743 families living in the community. The population density was 262.2 inhabitants per square mile (101.2/km^{2}). There were 2,353 housing units at an average density of 151.8 per square mile (58.6/km^{2}). The racial makeup of the community was 76.3% White, 18.5% Black or African American, .7% Native American, 1.7% Asian, 0.2% Pacific Islander, 0.7% from other races, and 2.0% from two or more races. 2.7% of the population were Hispanic or Latino of any race.

There were 2,248 households, out of which 33.8% had children under the age of 18 living with them, 63.7% were married couples living together, 10.1% had a female householder with no husband present, and 22.5% were non-families. 19.3% of all households were made up of individuals, and 6.3% had someone living alone who was 65 years of age or older. The average household size was 2.68 and the average family size was 3.08.

In the community, the population was spread out, with 25.6% under the age of 18, 6.9% from 18 to 24, 26.5% from 25 to 44, 28.9% from 45 to 64, and 12.0% who were 65 years of age or older. The median age was 38.9 years. For every 100 females, there were 93.4 males. For every 100 females age 18 and over, there were 91.4 males.

The median income for a household in the community was $68,864, and the median income for a family was $76,449. Males had a median income of $55,956 versus $36,100 for females. The per capita income for the community was $26,834. About 2.4% of families and 5.8% of the population were below the poverty line, including 5.8% of those under age 18 and 6.4% of those age 65 or over.

=== 2000 census ===
As of the census of 2000, there were 4,117 people, 1,492 households, and 1,250 families living in the community. The population density was 263.0 inhabitants per square mile (101.5/km^{2}). There were 1,565 housing units at an average density of 100.0 per square mile (38.6/km^{2}). The racial makeup of the community was 86.62% White, 9.40% Black or African American, 1.07% Native American, 0.73% Asian, 0.05% Pacific Islander, 0.19% from other races, and 1.94% from two or more races. 0.70% of the population were Hispanic or Latino of any race.

There were 1,492 households, out of which 40.5% had children under the age of 18 living with them, 72.8% were married couples living together, 8.8% had a female householder with no husband present, and 16.2% were non-families. 14.7% of all households were made up of individuals, and 4.6% had someone living alone who was 65 years of age or older. The average household size was 2.76 and the average family size was 3.05.

In the community, the population was spread out, with 27.5% under the age of 18, 6.3% from 18 to 24, 31.4% from 25 to 44, 25.1% from 45 to 64, and 9.6% who were 65 years of age or older. The median age was 38 years. For every 100 females, there were 97.7 males. For every 100 females age 18 and over, there were 96.1 males.

The median income for a household in the community was $54,766, and the median income for a family was $61,367. Males had a median income of $42,274 versus $29,241 for females. The per capita income for the community was $23,626. About 2.9% of families and 4.2% of the population were below the poverty line, including 3.9% of those under age 18 and none of those age 65 or over.
