= Moores Mill, Alabama =

- Census-designated place
- Location in Madison County and the state of Alabama
- Coordinates: 34°51′05″N 86°30′32″W
- Country: United States
- State: Alabama
- County: Madison

Area
  - Total: 13.77 sq mi (35.66 km^{2})
  - Land: 13.61 sq mi (35.24 km^{2})
  - Water: 0.17 sq mi (0.43 km^{2})
- Elevation: 692 ft (211 m)

Population (2020)
  - Total: 6,729
  - Density: 494.6/sq mi (190.97/km^{2})
- Time zone: UTC-6 (Central (CST))
  - Summer (DST): UTC-5 (CDT)
- FIPS code: 01-51216
- GNIS feature ID: 2403306

Moores Mill is an unincorporated community and census-designated place (CDP) in Madison County, Alabama, United States, and is included in the Huntsville-Decatur Combined Statistical Area. The population was 6,729 at the 2020 census, up from 5,682 at the 2010 census.

== Geography ==
Moores Mill is located in northern Madison County. It is bordered to the west by Meridianville and to the south by Huntsville.

According to the U.S. Census Bureau, the CDP has a total area of 13.8 square miles (36 km^{2}), of which 13.6 square miles (35 km^{2}) are land and 0.2 square miles (0.5 km^{2}), or 1.20%, are water.

== Demographics ==
Historical population
| Census | Pop. | Note | %± |
|---|---|---|---|
| 1990 | 3,362 | | — |
| 2000 | 5,178 | | 54.0% |
| 2010 | 5,682 | | 9.7% |
| 2020 | 6,729 | | 18.4% |
| 2024 (est.) | 6,678 | ▼ | −0.8% |
U.S. Decennial Census

Moores Mill saw a slight decline from 2024 population estimates.

=== Racial and ethnic composition ===
Moores Mill CDP, Alabama – Racial and ethnic composition Note: the US Census treats Hispanic/Latino as an ethnic category. This table excludes Latinos from the racial categories and assigns them to a separate category. Hispanics/Latinos may be of any race.
| Race / Ethnicity (NH = Non-Hispanic) | Pop 2000 | Pop 2010 | Pop 2020 | % 2000 | % 2010 | % 2020 |
|---|---|---|---|---|---|---|
| White alone (NH) | 3,977 | 3,962 | 4,406 | 76.81% | 69.73% | 65.48% |
| Black or African American alone (NH) | 962 | 1,280 | 1,446 | 18.58% | 22.53% | 21.49% |
| Native American or Alaska Native alone (NH) | 68 | 64 | 70 | 1.31% | 1.13% | 1.04% |
| Asian alone (NH) | 41 | 87 | 83 | 0.79% | 1.53% | 1.23% |
| Native Hawaiian or Pacific Islander alone (NH) | 1 | 4 | 3 | 0.02% | 0.07% | 0.04% |
| Other race alone (NH) | 2 | 4 | 14 | 0.04% | 0.07% | 0.21% |
| Mixed race or Multiracial (NH) | 76 | 147 | 433 | 1.47% | 2.59% | 6.43% |
| Hispanic or Latino (any race) | 51 | 134 | 274 | 0.98% | 2.36% | 4.07% |
| Total | 5,178 | 5,682 | 6,729 | 100.00% | 100.00% | 100.00% |

=== 2020 census ===
As of the 2020 census, Moores Mill had a population of 6,729. The median age was 41.1 years. 22.0% of residents were under the age of 18 and 15.0% of residents were 65 years of age or older. For every 100 females there were 96.1 males, and for every 100 females age 18 and over there were 93.1 males age 18 and over.

73.1% of residents lived in urban areas, while 26.9% lived in rural areas.

There were 2,628 households in Moores Mill, including 1,974 families, of which 32.0% had children under the age of 18 living in them. Of all households, 55.0% were married-couple households, 15.3% were households with a male householder and no spouse or partner present, and 23.9% were households with a female householder and no spouse or partner present. About 21.9% of all households were made up of individuals and 8.3% had someone living alone who was 65 years of age or older.

There were 2,752 housing units, of which 4.5% were vacant. The homeowner vacancy rate was 1.5% and the rental vacancy rate was 6.6%.

=== 2010 census ===
As of the census of 2010, there were 5,682 people, 2,204 households, and 1,673 families residing in the CDP. The population density was 410 inhabitants per square mile (160/km^{2}). There were 2,354 housing units at an average density of 173.1 per square mile (66.8/km^{2}). The racial makeup of the CDP was 70.9% White, 22.6% Black or African American, 1.1% Native American, 1.5% Asian, 0.1% Pacific Islander, 0.9% from other races, and 2.8% from two or more races. 2.4% of the population were Hispanic or Latino of any race.

There were 2,204 households, out of which 31.5% had children under the age of 18 living with them, 59.8% were married couples living together, 11.2% had a female householder with no husband present, and 24.1% were non-families. 20.8% of all households were made up of individuals, and 5.9% had someone living alone who was 65 years of age or older. The average household size was 2.58 and the average family size was 2.97.

In the CDP, the population was spread out, with 23.2% under the age of 18, 7.6% from 18 to 24, 26.9% from 25 to 44, 31.3% from 45 to 64, and 11.0% who were 65 years of age or older. The median age was 39.9 years. For every 100 females, there were 96.3 males. For every 100 females age 18 and over, there were 96.2 males.

The median income for a household in the CDP was $67,449, and the median income for a family was $79,010. Males had a median income of $47,981 versus $40,257 for females. The per capita income for the CDP was $30,155. About 6.8% of families and 10.1% of the population were below the poverty line, including 13.6% of those under age 18 and 9.5% of those age 65 or over.

=== 2000 census ===
As of the census of 2000, there were 5,178 people, 1,912 households, and 1,500 families residing in the CDP. The population density was 373.6 inhabitants per square mile (144.2/km^{2}). There were 2,030 housing units at an average density of 146.5 per square mile (56.6/km^{2}). The racial makeup of the CDP was 77.62% White, 18.58% Black or African American, 1.31% Native American, 0.79% Asian, 0.02% Pacific Islander, 0.10% from other races, and 1.58% from two or more races. 0.98% of the population were Hispanic or Latino of any race.

There were 1,912 households, out of which 38.9% had children under the age of 18 living with them, 66.6% were married couples living together, 8.6% had a female householder with no husband present, and 21.5% were non-families. 18.3% of all households were made up of individuals, and 4.1% had someone living alone who was 65 years of age or older. The average household size was 2.71 and the average family size was 3.09.

In the CDP, the population was spread out, with 27.9% under the age of 18, 7.4% from 18 to 24, 34.7% from 25 to 44, 22.4% from 45 to 64, and 7.6% who were 65 years of age or older. The median age was 35 years. For every 100 females, there were 100.7 males. For every 100 females age 18 and over, there were 98.8 males.

The median income for a household in the CDP was $50,292, and the median income for a family was $53,750. Males had a median income of $32,303 versus $25,449 for females. The per capita income for the CDP was $20,158. About 6.9% of families and 9.9% of the population were below the poverty line, including 14.7% of those under age 18 and 13.8% of those age 65 or over.

== Education ==
The local school district is Madison County Schools.
