= Madison County High School (Alabama) =

Secondary school in Gurley, Alabama, United States

Location
- 174 Brock Road; Gurley, Alabama 35748; United States; 34°42′08″N 86°22′32″W

Information
- School district: Madison County School System
- CEEB code: 011345
- Principal: Jeremy Lowry
- Teaching staff: 26.00 (on an FTE basis)
- Grades: 9-12
- Enrollment: 451 (2024-2025)
- Student to teacher ratio: 17.35
- Colors: Purple and gold
- Athletics: AHSAA 4A
- Mascot: Tiger
- Website: madisoncountyhighschool.mcssk12.org

Madison County High School is a secondary school in Gurley, Alabama, United States.

== History ==
Grades K-12 were once located on the original campus in Gurley. In 1999 grades 9-12 were moved to a separate campus on Brock Road near US Highway 72. Madison County Elementary operated in the original location and buildings built in the 1930s. It was also eventually retired and another elementary and middle school were built.

== Athletics ==
The Madison County Tigers compete in Alabama High School Athletic Association class 4A. They field teams in baseball, basketball, cheerleading, wrestling, cross country, football, golf, soccer, softball, swimming, tennis, and track and field.

State championship titles held by the school include:

- Boys basketball: 2013 (4A)
- Girls volleyball 2012 (4A)
- Boys basketball: 2007 (4A)
- Boys Outdoor Track and Field: 1997 (4A)
- Boys Indoor Track and Field: 1999 (4A-5A)
- Boys Outdoor Track and Field: 1999 (4A)
- Girls Outdoor Track and Field: 1998 (4A)

== Notable alumni ==
- Jordan Chunn, NFL player
