= Toney, Alabama =

- Unincorporated community
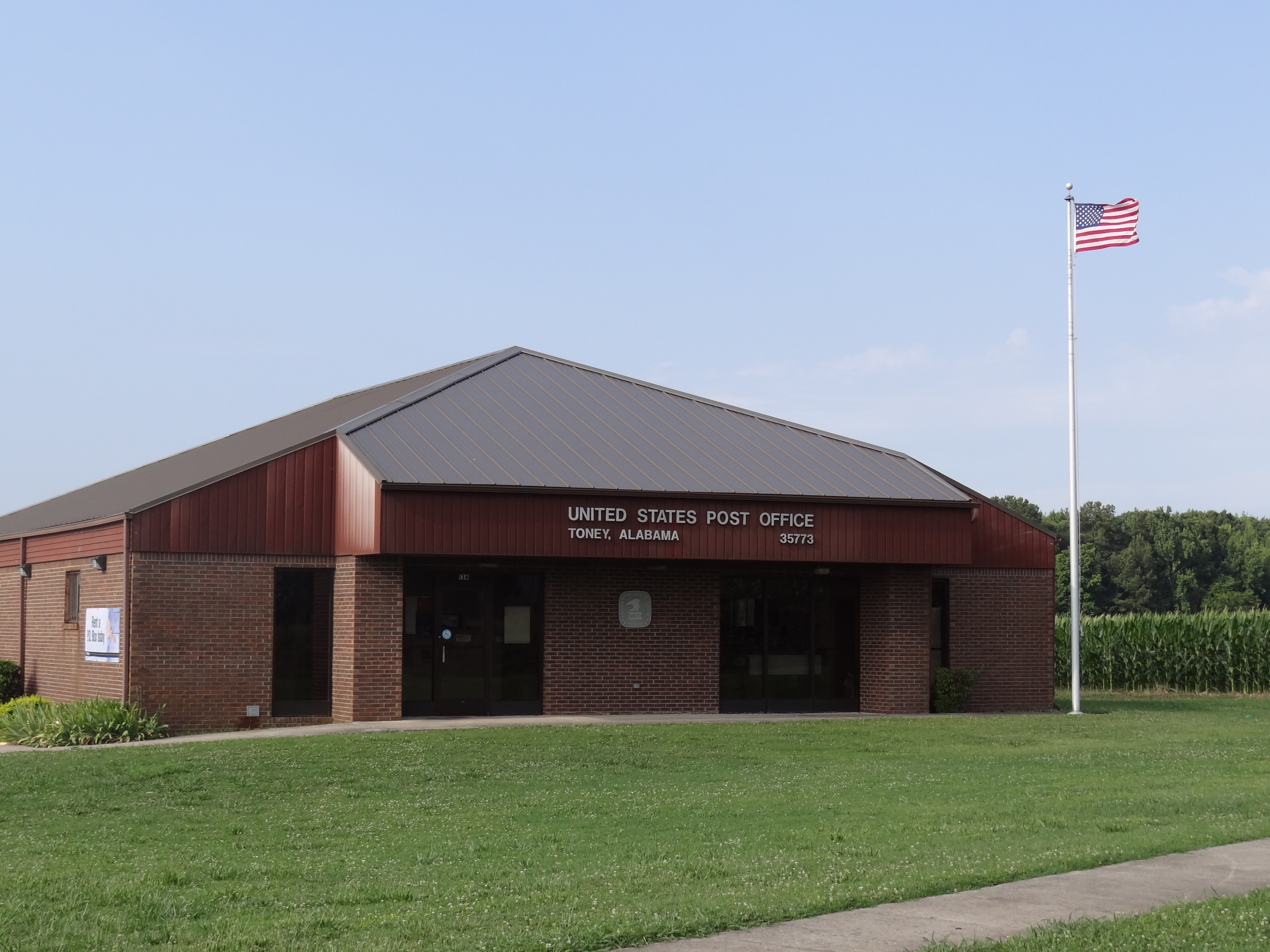
- Post office in Toney

- Location within Alabama Location within the United States
- Coordinates: 34°53′53″N 86°44′01″W
- Country: United States
- State: Alabama
- County: Madison
- Elevation: 827 ft (252 m)
- Time zone: UTC-6 (Central (CST))
  - Summer (DST): UTC-5 (CDT)
- GNIS feature ID: 128019

Toney is an unincorporated community in the northwestern part of Madison County, Alabama, United States. It is part of the Huntsville-Decatur Combined Statistical Area. According to "Appointment of Postmasters, 1832 - September 30, 1971" from the National Archive, the post office was established in 1898. Blanche Rawls Toney was the first post master, and Toney is said to have been named in her honor, probably by James E. Toney, her husband.

According to an article from Wed. June 14, 1899 Huntsville Weekly Democrat, as "Toney" the town was established in 1897 through the efforts of "Jim" Toney. By 1899 the railway owned by the "Nashville, Chattanooga & St. Louis" company was running through the village, and there was a depot there. In addition, there was a gin, grist and saw mill, as well as a blacksmith shop and four stores. The train ran from ca. 1897 to 1929 when it was discontinued due to financial problems of the company. The old depot still stands in its original location on the "Old Railroad Bed Road."

== Geography ==
Limestone Creek flows through the community, which is just a few miles south of its source in Lincoln County, Tennessee, before flowing into Limestone County.

== Public services ==
The Toney Volunteer Fire Department and the Madison County Sheriff's Department provide fire and police services in the Toney area .

A post office is located in the community.

Toney is part of the Madison County school district. Two of the system's schools are in Toney: Madison Cross Roads (grades K-5) and Sparkman Middle (grades 6-8). Toney students in grades 9-12 go to Sparkman High School in nearby Harvest. Toney once possessed its own school, but the original Toney High School is no longer in existence. It was established in 1917 and burned to the ground in 1949.
