= Hazel Green High School =

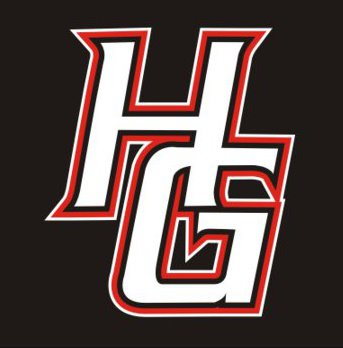

Location
- 14380 Highway 231431 N Hazel Green, Alabama 35750; United States; 34°56′10″N 86°34′12″W

Information
- Other name: HGHS
- Type: Public high school
- Established: 1988 (38 years ago)
- School district: Madison County Schools
- CEEB code: 011415
- NCES School ID: 010222000836
- Principal: Erroll Quentin Headen
- Teaching staff: 72.50 (on an FTE basis)
- Grades: 9–12
- Enrollment: 1,407 (2023-2024)
- Student to teacher ratio: 19.41
- Colors: Red, white,
- Mascot: Trojan
- Nickname: Trojans
- Website: hazelgreenhighschool.mcssk12.org

Hazel Green High School (HGHS) is a public high school in Hazel Green, Alabama, United States. It is the oldest school in the Madison County Schools district.

== History ==
=== Building ===
The earliest record of a school in Hazel Green, Alabama can be traced to 1819; as of that time, the area of Hazel Green was especially agrarian. Hazel Green School, as it was known by, was a small private schoolhouse located somewhere between what is now Hazel Green Elementary and Highway 431. Students were solicited in the Alabama Republican to attend Hazel Green School for one dollar per month. After that time, records show that numerous other schools were started. All schools in the Hazel Green area were private until another school with the same name of Hazel Green School emerged in 1920. On May 8, 1916, a 1,000 dollars grant was approved and construction began on the new Hazel Green School. A two-story building was constructed; in its first year of operation, it facilitated ninety-seven students and three teachers. From there, Hazel Green School was rebuilt several times (rebuilt in 1928, 1962, and 1994 to hold more capacity.) From 1920 until fall of 1994, Hazel Green School was a unit school for grades K-12. It was not until 1994 that Hazel Green School's upper grades were formed into Hazel Green High School (grades 9–12.)

In 1991 there were people in the community that were advocating for a new school building.

In 2010, a sixteen million-dollar renovation and addition was completed. This addition added eleven new classrooms (including two biology/chemistry labs, home economics labs and a special needs facility), a band room, a new gymnasium, and a cafetorium. The old cafetorium was remodeled into a black box theater.

=== Mascot ===
Originally, due to the town's name, Hazel Green School was identified as the Greenies (a mythical elf-like creature.) During the 1960s, considerations arose about the school colors in comparison to the mascot, the colors at the time being red and white. The HGS Booster Club decided that either the colors or the mascot must be replaced, so in 1965 Hazel Green School's mascot became the Trojan.

== Notable alumni and staff ==
- Jordan Beck, MLB player
- Kira Lewis Jr., NBA player
- George Lindsey, actor

== Athletic Programs ==
- Football
- Flag Football
- Baseball
- Basketball (Boys and Girls)
- Softball
- Basketball
- Cheerleading
- Soccer
- Volleyball
- Wrestling
- Tennis
- Swimming
- Bowling
- Golf
- Track/Cross Country
