= Elections in Alabama =

Elections in Alabama are authorized under the Alabama State Constitution, which establishes elections for the state level officers, cabinet, and legislature, and the election of county-level officers, including members of school boards.

The office of the Alabama Secretary of State has an Elections Division that oversees the execution of elections under state law.

In a 2020 study, Alabama was ranked as the 12th hardest state for citizens to vote in.

== State elections ==
=== History ===
With the disenfranchisement of blacks at the turn of the 20th century after the Reconstruction era, Alabama Democrats suppressed populist challenges and the state became part of the "Solid South." This constitution was not initially supported by the majority of whites, but Democrats used the call of white supremacy to gain passage. In addition to wanting to affirm white supremacy, the planter and business elite were concerned about voting by lower-class and uneducated whites. Historian J. Morgan Kousser found, "They disfranchised these whites as willingly as they deprived blacks of the vote." After passage, the 1901 constitution's provisions for a grandfather clause, cumulative poll taxes, literacy tests, and increased residency requirements state, county and precinct effectively disenfranchised many poor whites as well, to enable elite control. Glenn Feldman has documented that in total, by 1941 more whites than blacks had been disenfranchised in Alabama under this constitution. The Democratic Party dominated politics in every Southern state. For nearly 100 years, local and state elections in Alabama were decided in the Democratic Party primary, with generally only token Republican challengers running in the general election. Republicans ran a token candidate in every Alabama gubernatorial election except for 1930 and 1962. Their highest vote total between disenfranchisement and 1966 was the 21.28% of the vote they gained in 1922. Alabama was unusual among Deep South states in even having a token Republican running in the gubernatorial election. In nearby states like Georgia, South Carolina, Louisiana and Mississippi, Republicans did not field a gubernatorial candidate until the 1960s.

Contingent voting was used in the US state of Alabama from 1915 to 1931.

Demographic changes and developments in the 1986 Democratic primary election led to the election of the first Republican governor by majority-white voters in more than a century. This was the beginning of what is now Republican political dominance in the state. One million voters cast ballots in the 1986 Democratic primary. The then-incumbent lieutenant governor, Bill Baxley, lost the Democratic nomination for governor by approximately 8,000 votes to then fellow Democratic Attorney General Charles Graddick.

The state Democratic party's five-member election contest committee invalidated the primary election result, claiming that thousands of Republicans had "illegally" voted in the Democratic primary for Graddick. As a result, they removed Graddick from the ballot. The Democratic Party placed Baxley's name on the ballot as the Democratic candidate instead of Graddick. The voters of the state revolted at what they perceived as disenfranchisement of their right to vote and elected the Republican challenger, Guy Hunt, as governor. Hunt was nominated in a statewide Republican primary that had 28,000 participants, compared to >1,000,000 in the Democratic primary. That November, Hunt became the first Republican governor elected in Alabama since Reconstruction, winning 57 percent of the vote statewide against Baxley.

Since 1986, Republicans have won six of the seven gubernatorial elections and become increasingly competitive in Alabama politics at many levels. They currently control two seats of Alabama's U.S. Senate delegation and five out of seven of the state's U.S. Representative delegation. And all 9 seats on the Supreme Court of Alabama are held by Republicans.

Three Republican lieutenant governors have been elected since Reconstruction, Steve Windom, Kay Ivey (the current governor), and Will Ainsworth (the current incumbent). Windom served as lieutenant governor under Democratic Gov. Don Siegelman. Before 2011, the last time that Alabama had a governor and lieutenant governor of the same party was the period between 1983 and 1987 when George Wallace was serving his fourth term as governor and Bill Baxley was serving as lieutenant governor; both were Democrats.

=== 21st century ===
Republicans held all nine seats on the Alabama Supreme Court and all ten seats on the state appellate courts. Until 1994, no Republicans held any of the state court seats. In the 1994 general election, the then-incumbent Chief Justice of Alabama, Ernest C. Hornsby, refused to leave office after losing the election by precisely 262 votes to Republican Perry O. Hooper Sr. Hornsby sued Alabama and defiantly remained in office for nearly a year before finally giving up the seat after losing a long court battle that included a decision by the very Supreme Court of which he himself was the Chief Justice. This ultimately led to a collapse of support for Democrats at the ballot box in the next three or four election cycles. The Democrats lost the last of the nineteen court seats in August 2011 with the resignation of the last Democrat on the bench.

Republicans hold all seven of the statewide elected executive branch offices. Republicans hold six of the eight elected seats on the Alabama State Board of Education. In 2010, Republicans took large majorities of both chambers of the state legislature, giving them control of that body for the first time in 136 years. Democrats lost their last remaining statewide office in November 2012 with the re-election defeat of the president of the Alabama Public Service Commission, thus giving Republicans all three of its seats.

== Local elections ==
In the late 20th century, Alabama maintained its extensive system of at-large voting for most county and municipal offices, including County Commissioners, Boards of Education, Tax Assessors, Tax Collectors, etc. As a result, in majority-white jurisdictions, black minorities, even when significant in proportion and then able to register and vote, were generally unable to elect any candidates of their choice in such elections. These practices were challenged by plaintiffs under Dillard v. Crenshaw County (1986). The federal district judge found that the state's broad use of at-large elections had a racially discriminatory purpose and violated Section 2 of the Voting Rights Act of 1965. The state's use of a "place system", which precluded single-shot voting, was found specifically to have been adopted to "impede the ability of African-American voters to elect" candidates of their choice.

Following the court ruling on the state's use of this system, the plaintiffs expanded their dilution claims in Dillard in an omnibus application to "include the at-large election systems to include other county commissions, county school boards, and municipal councils across the state." The amended complaint covered nearly "200 units of local government", challenging at-large systems in local jurisdictions in which blacks were at least 10 percent of the population. Most of the affected jurisdictions settled these cases by adopting single-member district systems (SMDs), which has resulted in the election of more blacks to local offices, generally in proportion to their part of the jurisdiction's population; this has resulted in more Democrats being elected to office. Limited voting schemes were adopted by 21 municipalities in negotiation with the plaintiffs, and another six jurisdictions adopted cumulative voting arrangements. As a result, total representation by black candidates has increased in local elections for municipal and county government, as well as county school boards. Elections have been held since 1988 under these alternative systems.

As of the early 21st century, local elections in most rural counties, many of which are black dominated, are generally decided in the Democratic primary, and local elections in metropolitan and suburban counties, which are generally white majority, are decided in the Republican primary, although there are exceptions.

Alabama's 67 County Sheriffs are elected in partisan elections, and Democrats until 2016 retained the majority of those posts. The split as of April 2017 is 32 Democrats, 34 Republicans, and 1 Independent (Fayette). Most Democrat sheriffs have been elected in rural counties. The majority of Republican sheriffs have been elected in more urban/suburban and heavily populated counties, which tend to be majority white. Just two of 19 Alabama counties with a population of over 75,000 (Limestone and Montgomery) have a Democratic sheriff; and seventeen of 48 Alabama counties with a population of under 75,000 have Republican sheriffs (Autauga, Bibb, Blount, Cherokee, Chilton, Clarke, Cleburne, Crenshaw, Coffee, Coosa, Covington, Dale, Geneva, Jackson, Tallapoosa, Walker, and Winston). The state has one female sheriff (Morgan) and ten black sheriffs (Bullock, Greene, Hale, Lowndes, Macon, Marengo, Montgomery, Perry, Sumter, and Wilcox).

== Federal elections ==
=== History ===
United States presidential election results for Alabama
Year	Republican / Whig		Democratic		Third party(ies)	
Year	No.	%	No.	%	No.	%
1824	2,422	17.80%	9,429	69.32%	1,752	12.88%
1828	1,878	10.09%	16,736	89.89%	4	0.02%
1832	5	0.03%	14,286	99.97%	0	0.00%
1836	16,658	44.66%	20,638	55.34%	0	0.00%
1840	28,515	45.62%	33,996	54.38%	0	0.00%
1844	26,002	41.01%	37,401	58.99%	0	0.00%
1848	30,482	49.44%	31,173	50.56%	4	0.01%
1852	15,061	34.12%	26,881	60.89%	2,205	4.99%
1856	0	0.00%	46,739	62.08%	28,552	37.92%
1860	0	0.00%	13,618	15.11%	76,504	84.89%
1868	76,667	51.25%	72,921	48.75%	6	0.00%
1872	90,272	53.19%	79,444	46.81%	0	0.00%
1876	68,708	40.02%	102,989	59.98%	2	0.00%
1880	56,350	37.10%	91,130	59.99%	4,422	2.91%
1884	59,444	38.69%	92,736	60.37%	1,444	0.94%
1888	57,177	32.66%	117,314	67.00%	594	0.34%
1892	9,184	3.95%	138,135	59.40%	85,224	36.65%
1896	55,673	28.61%	130,298	66.96%	8,609	4.42%
1900	55,612	34.82%	97,129	60.82%	6,951	4.35%
1904	22,472	20.65%	79,857	73.37%	6,516	5.99%
1908	25,372	24.18%	74,374	70.88%	5,186	4.94%
1912	9,717	8.24%	82,438	69.94%	25,714	21.82%
1916	28,662	21.92%	99,409	76.04%	2,657	2.03%
1920	96,589	37.11%	160,560	61.68%	3,158	1.21%
1924	40,615	25.02%	113,138	69.69%	8,602	5.30%
1928	120,725	48.49%	127,796	51.33%	460	0.18%
1932	34,675	14.13%	207,910	84.74%	2,769	1.13%
1936	35,358	12.82%	238,196	86.38%	2,190	0.79%
1940	42,184	14.34%	250,726	85.22%	1,309	0.44%
1944	44,540	18.20%	198,918	81.28%	1,285	0.53%
1948	40,930	19.04%	0	0.00%	174,050	80.96%
1952	149,231	35.02%	275,075	64.55%	1,814	0.43%
1956	195,694	39.39%	280,844	56.52%	20,333	4.09%
1960	237,981	42.16%	318,303	56.39%	8,189	1.45%
1964	479,085	69.45%	0	0.00%	210,732	30.55%
1968	146,923	13.99%	196,579	18.72%	706,415	67.28%
1972	728,701	72.43%	256,923	25.54%	20,469	2.03%
1976	504,070	42.61%	659,170	55.73%	19,610	1.66%
1980	654,192	48.75%	636,730	47.45%	51,007	3.80%
1984	872,849	60.54%	551,899	38.28%	16,965	1.18%
1988	815,576	59.17%	549,506	39.86%	13,394	0.97%
1992	804,283	47.65%	690,080	40.88%	193,697	11.47%
1996	769,044	50.12%	662,165	43.16%	103,140	6.72%
2000	944,409	56.47%	695,602	41.59%	32,540	1.95%
2004	1,176,394	62.46%	693,933	36.84%	13,122	0.70%
2008	1,266,546	60.32%	813,479	38.74%	19,794	0.94%
2012	1,255,925	60.55%	795,696	38.36%	22,717	1.10%
2016	1,318,255	62.08%	729,547	34.36%	75,570	3.56%
2020	1,441,170	62.03%	849,624	36.57%	32,488	1.40%
2024	1,462,616	64.57%	772,412	34.10%	30,062	1.33%

From 1876 through 1956, Alabama supported only Democratic presidential candidates, by large margins. There were only two exceptions; the 1928 elections in which the Democrats won by a much smaller margin than normal due to Anti-Catholic prejudices against the Democratic candidate Al Smith, and the 1948 election when Alabama, along with Mississippi, Louisiana, and South Carolina, voted for Strom Thurmond of the pro-segregation States Rights Democratic Party. In 1960, the Democrats won with John F. Kennedy on the ballot. However, six of the state's 11 Democratic electors were members of the unpledged elector movement, and gave their electoral votes as a protest to Harry Byrd.

The Alabama Paradox is named after the 1880 observation by U.S. census clerk C.W. Seaton that the state of Alabama would lose one of its 8 seats in the House of Representatives if the size of the House were increased from 299 to 300.

In 1964, the state swung over dramatically to support Republican Barry Goldwater, who carried the state with an unheard-of 69 percent of the vote, carrying all but five counties. He was the first Republican to carry the state since 1872. Like much of the Deep South, Alabama's voters turned violently on President Lyndon Johnson in the wake of the Civil Rights Act of 1964.

In the 1968 presidential election, Alabama supported native son and American Independent Party candidate George Wallace over both Richard Nixon and Hubert Humphrey. Wallace was the official Democratic candidate in Alabama, while Humphrey was the National Democratic nominee. In 1976, Democratic candidate Jimmy Carter from Georgia carried the state, but Democratic control proved to be temporary- Carter is the only Democrat since 1964 to carry the state.

Alabama does not register voters by party, but in recent statewide elections, Republican turnout in statewide primaries has consistently exceeded that for the Democrats. Alabama is now considered a Republican stronghold at both the federal and state level, although Democrats still retain a slim majority in many local offices (sheriffs, county commissioners, etc.). The state has voted Republican in every presidential election since 1980, and Democrats have not seriously contested the state since. Republicans have also done increasingly well in Senate and House elections; they have held a majority of the state's congressional delegation and both Senate seats since 1997, although they briefly lost a Senate seat from 2018 to 2021. In 2010, Republicans won large majorities in both chambers of the Alabama Legislature ending 136 years of Democratic rule; see Dixiecrat. In 2012, Democrats lost the only remaining statewide office the party still held giving Republicans control of all 10 state constitutional offices. The GOP also has won all 19 statewide court seats.

The 11 counties that consistently vote Democratic are Black Belt counties, where African Americans are the majority racial group. Republicans have gotten over 60% of the vote in every presidential election since 2004.

=== Presidential elections ===
Vote in Alabama		National winner	
Year	Candidate	Year	Candidate
1820	James Monroe	1820	James Monroe
1824	Andrew Jackson	1824	John Quincy Adams
1828	Andrew Jackson	1828	Andrew Jackson
1832	Andrew Jackson	1832	Andrew Jackson
1836	Martin Van Buren	1836	Martin Van Buren
1840	Martin Van Buren	1840	William Henry Harrison
1844	James K. Polk	1844	James K. Polk
1848	Lewis Cass	1848	Zachary Taylor
1852	Franklin Pierce	1852	Franklin Pierce
1856	James Buchanan	1856	James Buchanan
1860	John C. Breckinridge	1860	Abraham Lincoln
1864		1864	Abraham Lincoln
1868	Ulysses S. Grant	1868	Ulysses S. Grant
1872	Ulysses S. Grant	1872	Ulysses S. Grant
1876	Samuel J. Tilden	1876	Rutherford B. Hayes
1880	Winfield Scott Hancock	1880	James A. Garfield
1884	Grover Cleveland	1884	Grover Cleveland
1888	Grover Cleveland	1888	Benjamin Harrison
1892	Grover Cleveland	1892	Grover Cleveland
1896	William Jennings Bryan	1896	William McKinley
1900	William Jennings Bryan	1900	William McKinley
1904	Alton B. Parker	1904	Theodore Roosevelt
1908	William Jennings Bryan	1908	William Howard Taft
1912	Woodrow Wilson	1912	Woodrow Wilson
1916	Woodrow Wilson	1916	Woodrow Wilson
1920	James M. Cox	1920	Warren G. Harding
1924	John W. Davis	1924	Calvin Coolidge
1928	Al Smith	1928	Herbert Hoover
1932	Franklin D. Roosevelt	1932	Franklin D. Roosevelt
1936	Franklin D. Roosevelt	1936	Franklin D. Roosevelt
1940	Franklin D. Roosevelt	1940	Franklin D. Roosevelt
1944	Franklin D. Roosevelt	1944	Franklin D. Roosevelt
1948	Strom Thurmond	1948	Harry S. Truman
1952	Adlai Stevenson	1952	Dwight D. Eisenhower
1956	Adlai Stevenson	1956	Dwight D. Eisenhower
1960	Harry F. Byrd	1960	John F. Kennedy
1964	Barry Goldwater	1964	Lyndon B. Johnson
1968	George Wallace	1968	Richard Nixon
1972	Richard Nixon	1972	Richard Nixon
1976	Jimmy Carter	1976	Jimmy Carter
1980	Ronald Reagan	1980	Ronald Reagan
1984	Ronald Reagan	1984	Ronald Reagan
1988	George H. W. Bush	1988	George H. W. Bush
1992	George H. W. Bush	1992	Bill Clinton
1996	Bob Dole	1996	Bill Clinton
2000	George W. Bush	2000	George W. Bush
2004	George W. Bush	2004	George W. Bush
2008	John McCain	2008	Barack Obama
2012	Mitt Romney	2012	Barack Obama
2016	Donald Trump	2016	Donald Trump
2020	Donald Trump	2020	Joe Biden
2024	Donald Trump	2024	Donald Trump

== See also ==
- 2026 Alabama elections
- Government of Alabama
- Political party strength in Alabama
- Politics of Alabama
- Elections in the United States
- Women's suffrage in Alabama
