= Oakland, Alabama =

Oakland, Alabama may refer to:

- Oakland, Chambers County, Alabama
- Oakland, Lauderdale County, Alabama
- Oakland, Limestone County, Alabama, near Athens
- Oakland (near Madison), Limestone County, Alabama
