= Levert (disambiguation) =

LeVert was an R&B vocal group, formed in 1984 by brothers Gerald and Sean Levert.

Levert or LeVert may also refer to:

- Levert, Alabama, unincorporated community in Perry County, Alabama, United States

== People with the surname Levert ==
- Caris LeVert (born 1994), American basketball player
- Charles Levert (1825–1899), French public servant and politician
- Eddie Levert, (born 1942), American singer, lead vocalist of The O'Jays and father of Gerald and Sean Levert
- Gerald Levert, (1966–2006), American R&B singer
- Léopold Levert (1819–1882), French artist
- Mireille Levert (born 1956), Canadian writer
- Sean Levert, (1968–2008), American R&B singer

== People with the given name Levert ==
- Levert Carr (born 1944), American football player

== See also ==
- Lavert, given name
