= League of Women Voters of Alabama =

US nonpartisan nonprofit organization

The League of Women Voters of Alabama (LWVAL) is a nonpartisan civic and political organization in the state of Alabama. The mission of LWVAL is to encourage informed and active participation in government, and to influence public policy through education and advocacy. Like other state arms of the league, it is affiliated to the national League of Women Voters.

== History ==
The League of Women Voters of Alabama was initially established in 1920, but it disbanded in 1928. The organization was later re-established in 1946 with the objective of educating voters and facilitating discussions on public matters. Records of local league chapters, including Auburn, Birmingham, Huntsville, Mobile, Montgomery and Tuscaloosa, can be found at Auburn University's library archives. According to these records, the League discussed topics such as educational funding, taxation, desegregation, congressional re-apportionment, and constitutional revision.

The McCall Library at the University of South Alabama has the records of the local Mobile chapter of the League of Women Voters over the period of 1956 to 1987. On May 23, 1955, twenty-four individuals met for the first meeting of the League of Woman Voters of Mobile at the Mobile Public Library, and the Chapter achieved provisional membership status within the National League of Women Voters by April 1956. The establishment of the Mobile chapter was a direct reaction to the state courts of Alabama outlawing the NAACP.

== Current League ==
There are nine local leagues in the state:

- LWV Of Baldwin County
- LWV Of East Alabama
- LWV Of Greater Birmingham
- LWV of Greater Montgomery
- LWV Of Greater Tuscaloosa
- LWV Of Mobile
- LWV of Southeast Alabama
- LWV of Tennessee Valley
- LWV Of the Shoals

== See also ==
- Elections in Alabama
  - Category:2024 elections in Alabama
