= Elkmont, Alabama =

- Town
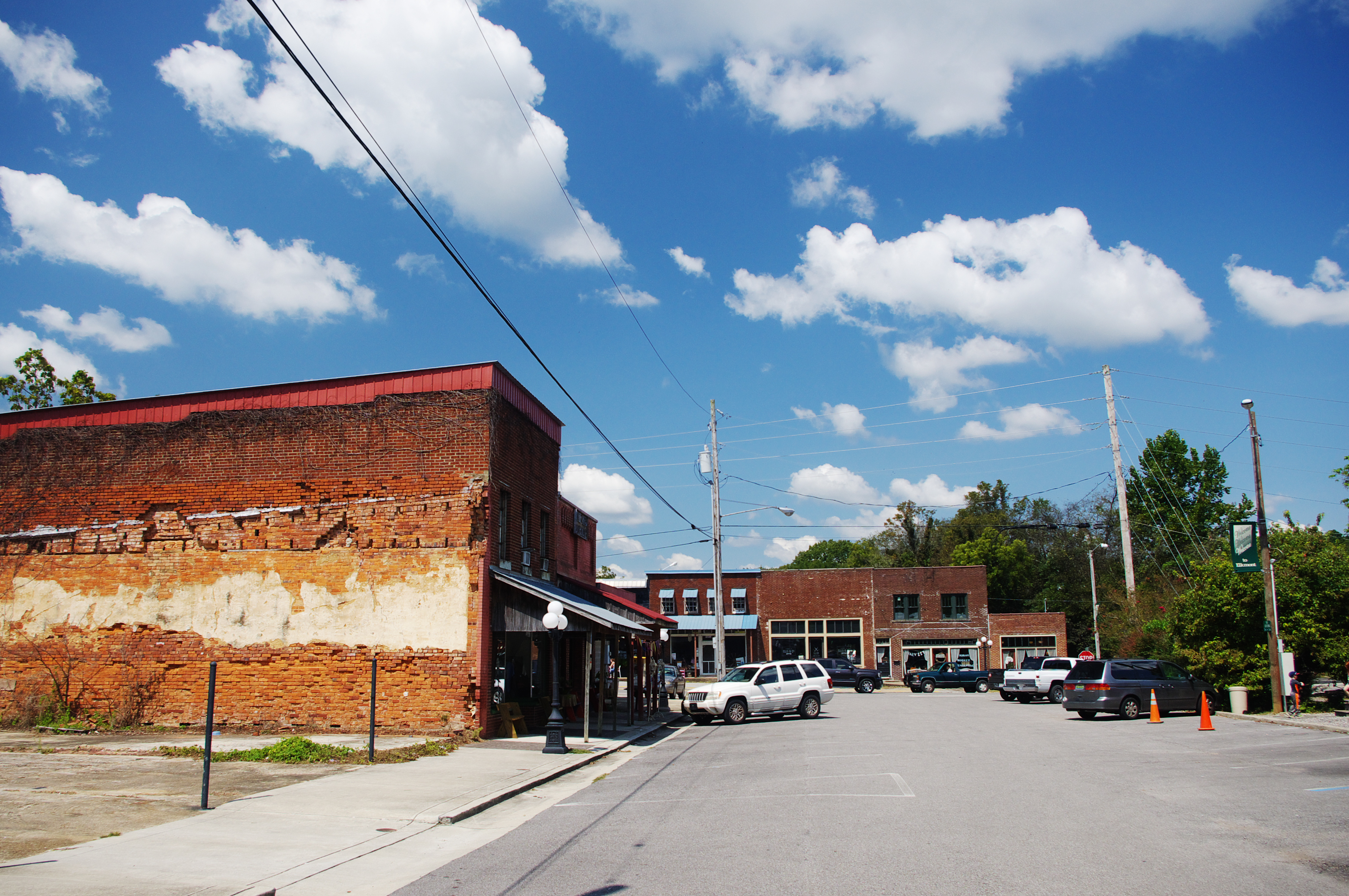
- Shops along Railroad Street

- Logo

- Location of Elkmont in Limestone County, Alabama.
- Coordinates: 34°55′44″N 86°58′35″W
- Country: United States
- State: Alabama
- County: Limestone
- Incorporated: March 28, 1873

Area
  - Total: 1.65 sq mi (4.28 km^{2})
  - Land: 1.64 sq mi (4.25 km^{2})
  - Water: 0.012 sq mi (0.03 km^{2})
- Elevation: 850 ft (260 m)

Population (2020)
  - Total: 411
  - Density: 250.2/sq mi (96.61/km^{2})
- Time zone: UTC-6 (Central (CST))
  - Summer (DST): UTC-5 (CDT)
- ZIP code: 35620
- Area code: 256
- FIPS code: 01-23488
- GNIS feature ID: 2406437
- Website: https://www.elkmontal.gov/

Elkmont is a town in north central Limestone County, Alabama, United States, and is included in the Huntsville-Decatur Combined Statistical Area. As of the 2020 census, Elkmont had a population of 411.

== History ==
Elkmont began as a stop known as "Fort Hampton" along the newly-constructed Tennessee and Alabama Central Railroad in 1859. The name was changed to "Elkmont," after the elk that once flourished in the area, in 1866. The Tennessee and Alabama Central eventually became part of the L&N Railroad system, which built the current depot (now used as a community center) in 1887. The railroad tracks have since been removed, and are now part of the Richard Martin Trail. Elkmont incorporated in 1873.

During the Civil War, the Battle of Sulphur Creek Trestle was fought just south of Elkmont in September 1864. The site is now listed on the National Register of Historic Places.

== Geography ==
Elkmont is concentrated around the intersection of County Road 49 (Upper Fort Hampton Road) and the old railroad line (now the Richard Martin Trail), several miles north of Athens, and a few miles south of the Alabama-Tennessee state line. Interstate 65 passes to the east of Elkmont, and the Elk River passes to the west. State Route 127 runs along a portion of Elkmont's western municipal boundary.

According to the U.S. Census Bureau, the town has a total area of 1.6 square miles (4.1 km^{2}), all land.

== Demographics ==
Historical population
Census	Pop.	Note	%±
1880	233		—
1900	174		—
1910	188		8.0%
1920	261		38.8%
1930	192		−26.4%
1940	185		−3.6%
1950	179		−3.2%
1960	169		−5.6%
1970	394		133.1%
1980	429		8.9%
1990	389		−9.3%
2000	470		20.8%
2010	434		−7.7%
2020	411		−5.3%
U.S. Decennial Census; 2013 Estimate

As of the census of 2000, there were 470 people, 172 households, and 136 families residing in the town. The population density was 292.9 inhabitants per square mile (113.1/km^{2}). There were 189 housing units at an average density of 117.8 per square mile (45.5/km^{2}). The racial makeup of the town was 83.40% White, 15.11% Black or African American, 1.06% from other races, and 0.43% from two or more races. 1.28% of the population were Hispanic or Latino of any race.

There were 172 households, out of which 40.1% had children under the age of 18 living with them, 64.0% were married couples living together, 9.9% had a female householder with no husband present, and 20.9% were non-families. 19.2% of all households were made up of individuals, and 12.2% had someone living alone who was 65 years of age or older. The average household size was 2.73 and the average family size was 3.10.

In the town, the population was spread out, with 28.3% under the age of 18, 6.0% from 18 to 24, 32.1% from 25 to 44, 18.9% from 45 to 64, and 14.7% who were 65 years of age or older. The median age was 35 years. For every 100 females, there were 97.5 males. For every 100 females age 18 and over, there were 100.6 males.

The median income for a household in the town was $31,771, and the median income for a family was $35,000. Males had a median income of $33,750 versus $21,250 for females. The per capita income for the town was $17,654. About 15.9% of families and 20.4% of the population were below the poverty line, including 34.9% of those under age 18 and 13.9% of those age 65 or over.

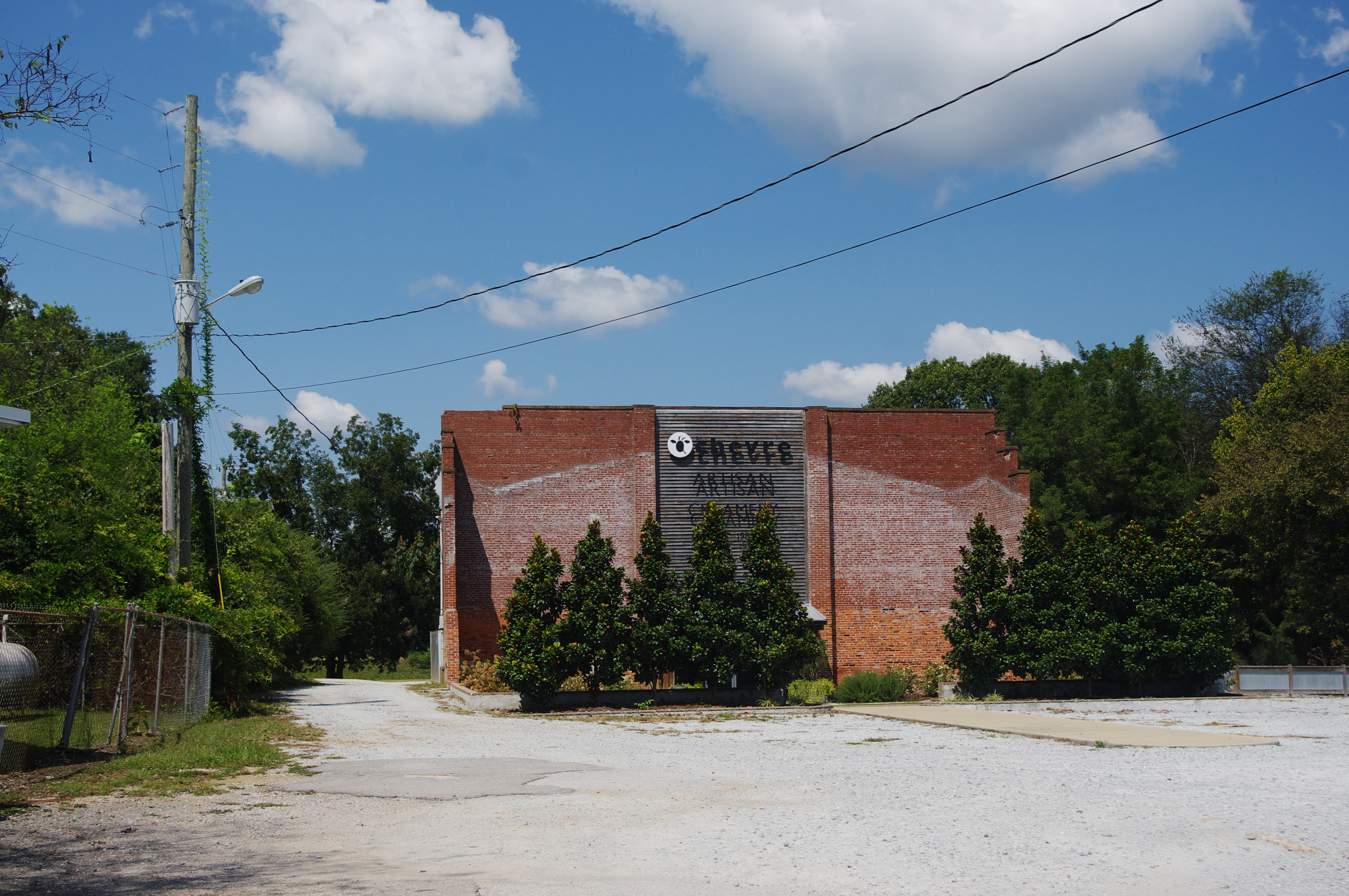
Belle Chevre building

== Economy ==
The ELECTRICFIL Corporation, a subsidiary of French Group EFI Automotive, employs nearly 150 people in the Elkmont area.

The Richard Martin Trail passes through Elkmont along the old rail line.

== Education ==
It is in the Limestone County School District.

== Notable people ==
- Michael Boley, professional football linebacker
- The Delmore Brothers, country music singers and early stars of the Grand Ole Opry
- Billy Hogan, singer/songwriter
- Horace Elmo Nichols, chief justice of the Supreme Court of Georgia from 1975 to 1980
