= Augustin, Alabama =

Unincorporated community in Brownsville, Alabama

- Unincorporated community
- Location within Alabama Location within the United States
- Coordinates: 32°30′22″N 87°06′28″W
- Country: United States
- State: Alabama
- County: Perry
- Elevation: 157 ft (48 m)
- Time zone: UTC-6 (Central (CST))
  - Summer (DST): UTC-5 (CDT)
- Area code: 334
- GNIS feature ID: 159095

Augustin is an unincorporated community in Perry County, Alabama, United States. A post office operated under the name Augustin from 1883 to 1943. Geologist George Perkins Merrill described a meteorite held in the National Museum of Natural History that was found in a field in Augustin.

== Demographics ==
According to the returns from 1850-2010 for Alabama, it has never reported a population figure separately on the U.S. Census.
