= Burgreen Gin =

Unincorporated community in Alabama, United States

Burgreen Gin Burgreen Corner, Burgreen
- Unincorporated community
- Location within Alabama Location within the United States
- Coordinates: 34°43′44″N 86°47′47″W
- Country: United States
- State: Alabama
- County: Limestone
- City: Madison
- Elevation: 692 ft (211 m)

Population (2023)
  - Unincorporated community: 60,854
  - Metro: 514,465 (US: 109th)
- Time zone: UTC-6 (Central Standard Time)
  - Summer (DST): UTC-5 (Central Daylight Time)
- Area code: 256
- GNIS feature ID: 115228

Burgreen Gin is an Unincorporated Community in Limestone County, Alabama. It is mostly located within the city of Madison, with small portions remaining in unincorporated Limestone County. Burgreen Gin is within the Huntsville Metropolitan Area, and is a suburb of Huntsville.
