= Radford, Alabama =

Unincorporated community in Brownsville, Alabama

- Unincorporated community
- Location within Alabama Location within the United States
- Coordinates: 32°35′21″N 87°12′00″W
- Country: United States
- State: Alabama
- County: Perry
- Elevation: 161 ft (49 m)
- Time zone: UTC-6 (Central (CST))
  - Summer (DST): UTC-5 (CDT)
- Area code: 334
- GNIS feature ID: 153099

Radford, also known as Radfordsville, or Richardson Store, is an unincorporated community in Perry County, Alabama, United States. Radford is located on Alabama State Route 14, 7.57 miles (12.18 km) east southeast of Marion.

== History ==
Radford is named for the family of William Radford, who settled in the area circa 1820. A post office operated under the name Radfordsville from 1846 to 1906.
