= Vilula, Alabama =

Unincorporated community in Brownsville, Alabama

- Unincorporated community
- Location within Alabama Location within the United States
- Coordinates: 32°32′59″N 87°16′14″W
- Country: United States
- State: Alabama
- County: Perry
- Elevation: 187 ft (57 m)
- Time zone: UTC-6 (Central (CST))
  - Summer (DST): UTC-5 (CDT)
- Area code: 334
- GNIS feature ID: 128457

Vilula, also known as Vihula, is an unincorporated community in Perry County, Alabama, United States.

== History ==
A post office operated under the name Vilula from 1886 to 1894. One structure in Vilula, The Birds' Nest, was documented in the Historic American Buildings Survey.

== Gallery ==
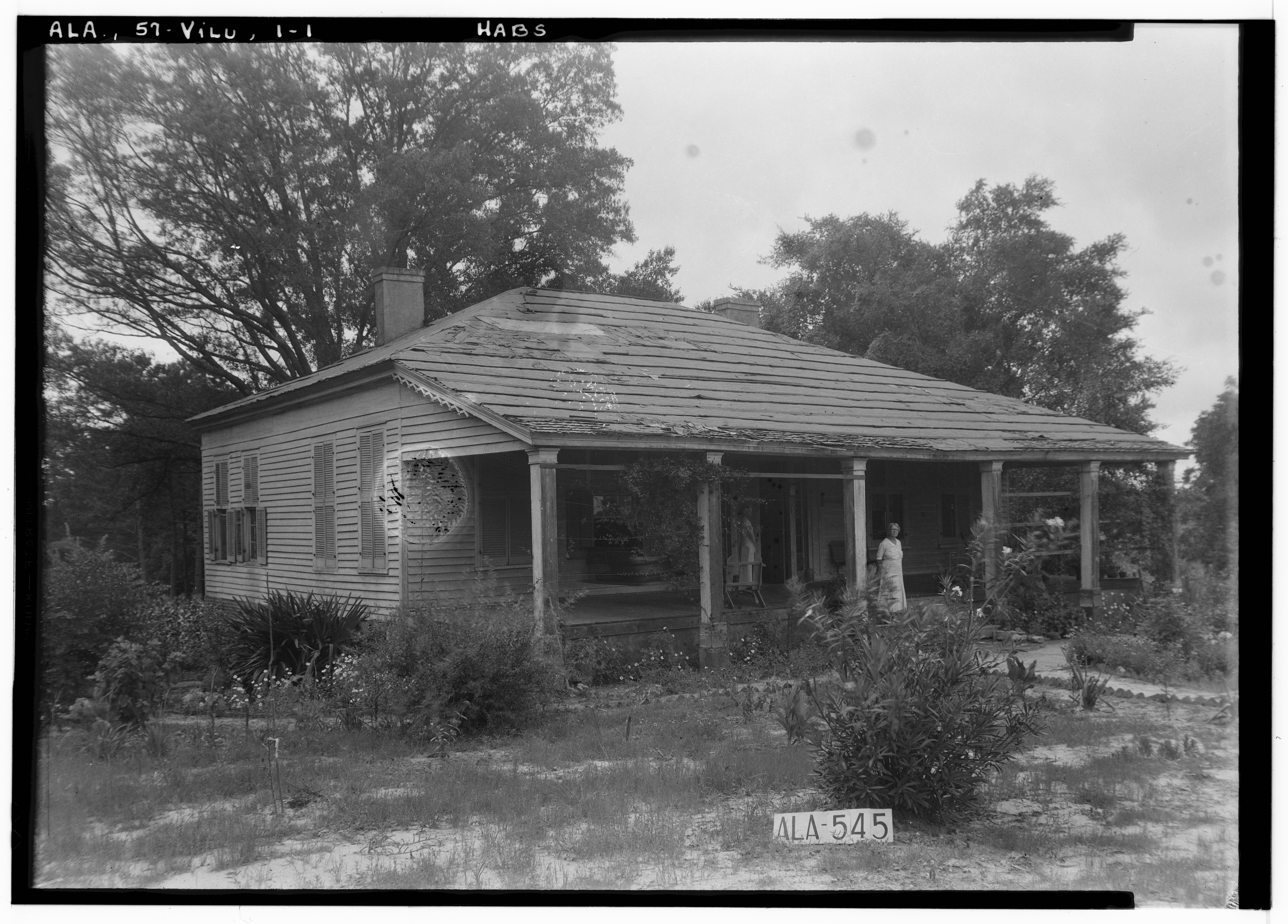
Front view of The Birds' Nest

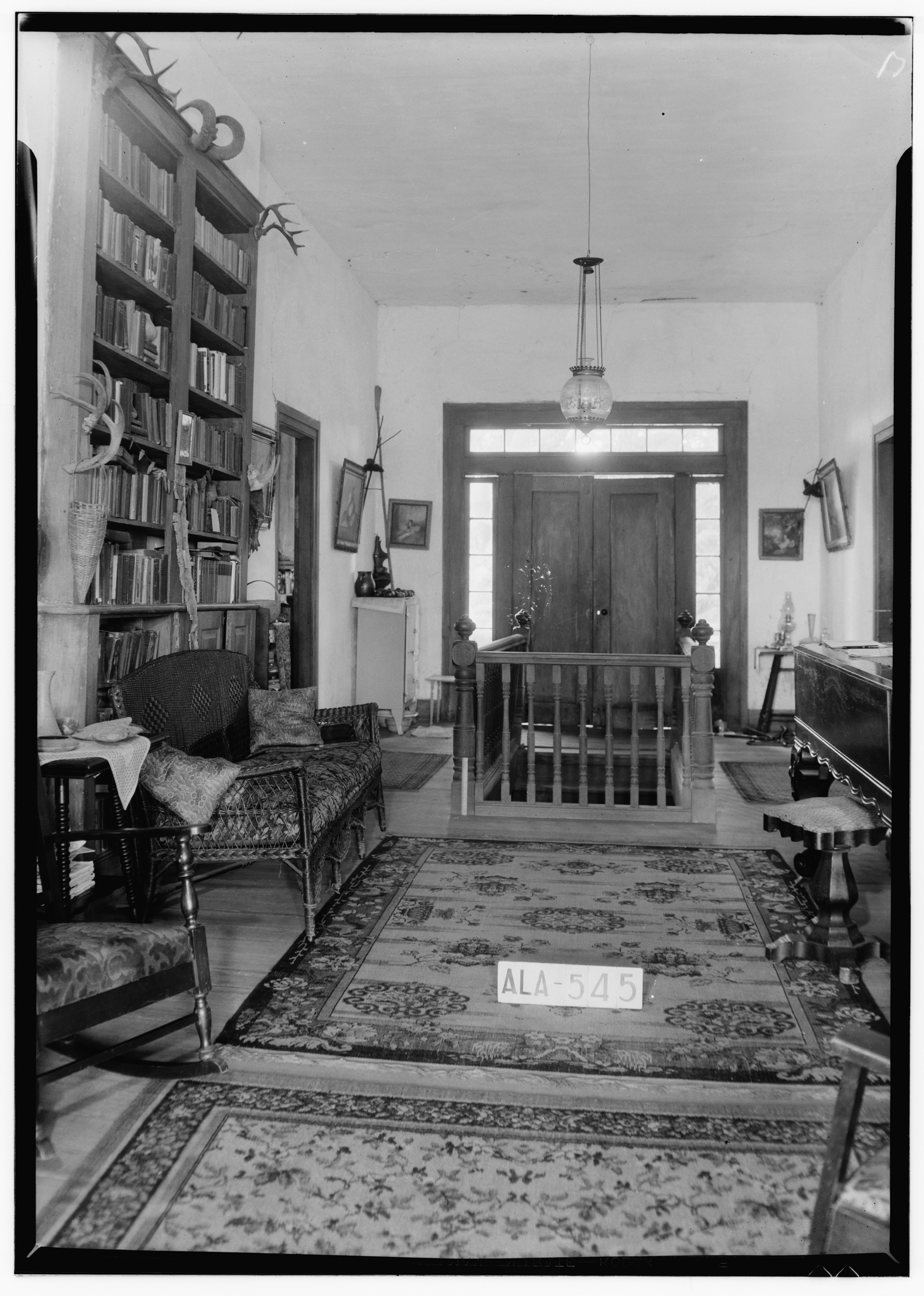
Interior view of The Birds' Nest

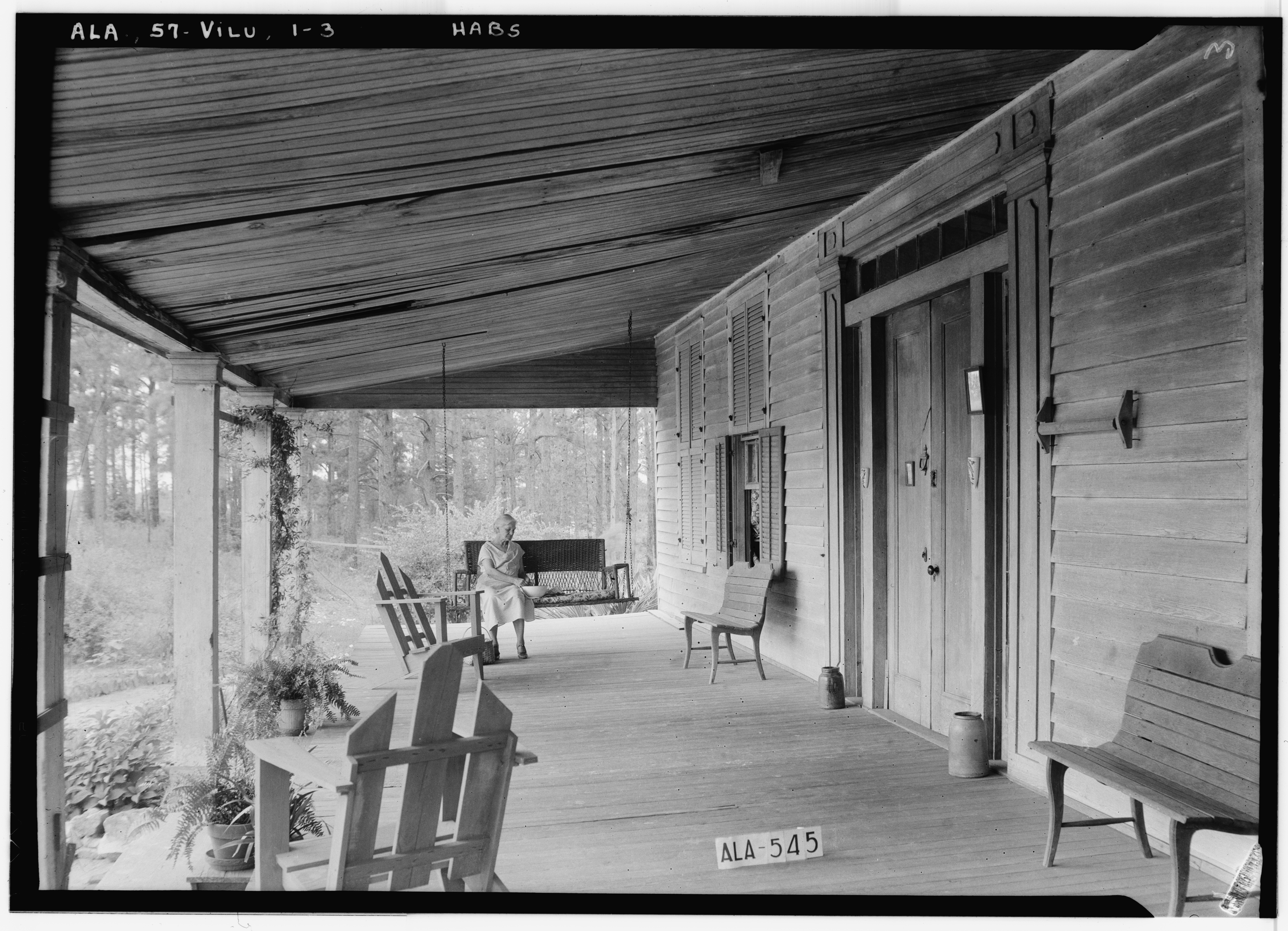
Front porch of The Birds' Nest
