= Good Springs, Alabama =

Unincorporated community in Alabama, United States

- Unincorporated community
- Location within Alabama Location within the United States
- Coordinates: 34°56′50″N 87°11′39″W
- Country: United States
- State: Alabama
- County: Limestone
- Elevation: 787 ft (240 m)
- Time zone: UTC-6 (Central (CST))
  - Summer (DST): UTC-5 (CDT)
- Area codes: 256 & 938
- GNIS feature ID: 151794

Good Springs is an unincorporated community in Limestone County, Alabama, United States.
