= Jericho, Alabama =

Unincorporated community in Brownsville, Alabama

- Unincorporated community
- Location within Alabama Location within the United States
- Coordinates: 32°46′26″N 87°16′31″W
- Country: United States
- State: Alabama
- County: Perry
- Elevation: 194 ft (59 m)
- Time zone: UTC-6 (Central (CST))
  - Summer (DST): UTC-5 (CDT)
- Area code: 334
- GNIS feature ID: 159860

Jericho is an unincorporated community in Perry County, Alabama, United States. Jericho is located on Alabama State Route 5, 11.2 miles (18.0 km) north northeast of Marion.

== History ==
A post office operated under the name Jericho from 1836 to 1907. At one point, Jericho was home to at least one sawmill and three gristmills.
