= Oakland (near Madison), Limestone County, Alabama =

Unincorporated community in Alabama, United States

Oakland
- Unincorporated community
- Oakland's position in Alabama.
- Coordinates: 34°43′45″N 86°48′25″W
- Country: United States
- State: Alabama
- County: Limestone
- Elevation: 692 ft (211 m)
- Time zone: UTC-6 (Central (CST))
  - Summer (DST): UTC-5 (CDT)
- GNIS feature ID: 137882

Oakland is an unincorporated community in Limestone County, Alabama, United States. It is in the eastern part of the county near Madison at the intersection of Huntsville Brownsferry Road (formerly known as County Road 24) and County Road 119, as opposed to Oakland, Limestone County, Alabama which is just west of Athens.

Oakland is named after the Oakland Spring, and the Oakland Spring Branch which is west of the community. The area has recently been acquired into the Huntsville borders in Limestone county. The community is made up of about 18 buildings, of which 3 are churches and the rest are houses.
