= Thach, Alabama =

Unincorporated community in Alabama, United States

- Unincorporated community
- Location within Alabama Location within the United States
- Coordinates: 34°55′11″N 86°53′34″W
- Country: United States
- State: Alabama
- County: Limestone
- Elevation: 840 ft (260 m)
- Time zone: UTC-6 (Central (CST))
  - Summer (DST): UTC-5 (CDT)
- GNIS feature ID: 153671

Thach, also spelled Thatch, is an unincorporated community in Limestone County, Alabama, United States.

== History ==
Thach is likely named after the Thach family, who were early settlers of the area. A post office operated under the name Thatch from 1921 to 1933.
