= Scarce Grease, Alabama =

Unincorporated community in Alabama, United States

- Unincorporated community
- Location within Alabama Location within the United States
- Coordinates: 34°58′14″N 87°7′57″W
- Country: United States
- State: Alabama
- County: Limestone
- Elevation: 653 ft (199 m)
- Time zone: UTC-6 (Central (CST))
  - Summer (DST): UTC-5 (CDT)
- GNIS feature ID: 157021

Scarce Grease, also known as Scarse Grease or Rockaway, is an unincorporated community in Limestone County, Alabama, United States.

== History ==
A post office operated under the name Rockaway from 1891 to 1904.
