= Oakmulgee, Alabama =

Unincorporated community in Perry County, Alabama

- Unincorporated community
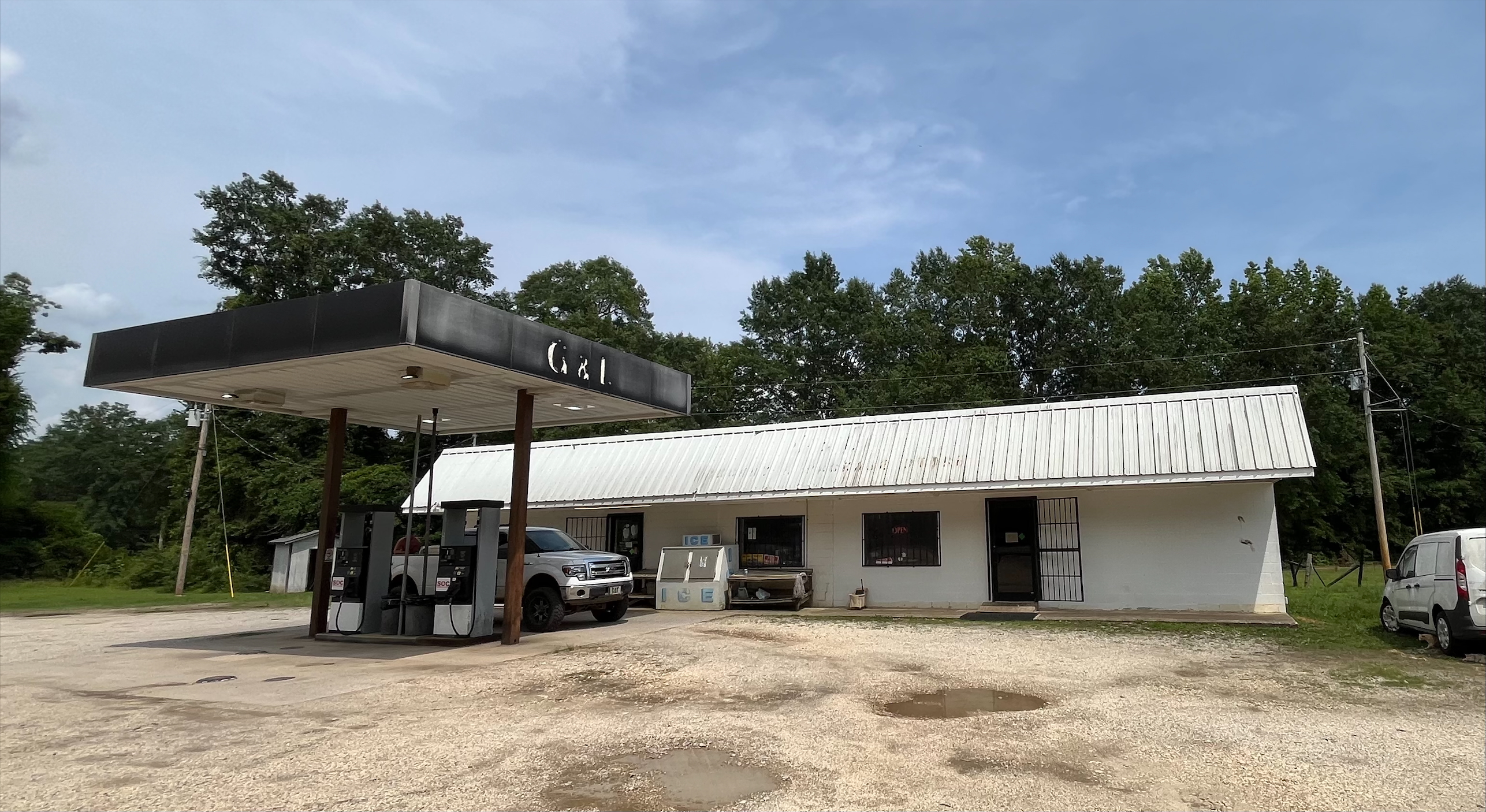
- Store in Oakmulgee

- Location within Alabama Location within the United States
- Coordinates: 32°47′47″N 87°02′38″W
- Country: United States
- State: Alabama
- County: Perry
- Elevation: 322 ft (98 m)
- Time zone: UTC-6 (Central (CST))
  - Summer (DST): UTC-5 (CDT)
- Area code: 334
- GNIS feature ID: 160283

Oakmulgee, also known as Oakmulga, or Ocmulgee, is an unincorporated community in Perry County, Alabama, United States. Oakmulgee is located on Alabama State Route 183, 21.5 miles (34.6 km) northeast of Marion. Oakmulgee lies entirely within the Oakmulgee District of the Talladega National Forest.

== History ==
The name Oakmulgee is derived from the Hitchiti word ockmulgee, which means "bubbling water," with oki meaning "water" and mulgi meaning "boiling". A post office operated under the name Ocmulgee from 1850 to 1853, under the name Oakmulga from 1857 to 1866, and under the name Oakmulgee from 1876 to 1913. At one point, Oakmulgee was home to at least three gins, three sawmills and three gristmills.
