= Perryville, Alabama =

Unincorporated community in Brownsville, Alabama

- Unincorporated community
- Location within Alabama Location within the United States
- Coordinates: 32°37′00″N 87°06′51″W
- Country: United States
- State: Alabama
- County: Perry
- Elevation: 394 ft (120 m)
- Time zone: UTC-6 (Central (CST))
  - Summer (DST): UTC-5 (CDT)
- Area code: 334
- GNIS feature ID: 160364

Perryville is an unincorporated community in Perry County, Alabama, United States.

== History ==
Perryville is most likely named after Perry County, which in turn is named for Commodore Oliver Hazard Perry. A post office operated under the name Perryville from 1839 to 1954. In 1846, the Perryville schoolhouse was built on land sold by Exum Melton.
