= Suttle, Alabama =

Unincorporated community in Brownsville, Alabama

- Unincorporated community
- Location within Alabama Location within the United States
- Coordinates: 32°32′10″N 87°10′47″W
- Country: United States
- State: Alabama
- County: Perry
- Elevation: 148 ft (45 m)
- Time zone: UTC-6 (Central (CST))
  - Summer (DST): UTC-5 (CDT)
- Area code: 334
- GNIS feature ID: 153614

Suttle, also known as Felix, is an unincorporated community in Perry County, Alabama, United States. Suttle is located on Alabama State Route 14, 10.6 miles (17.1 km) southeast of Marion.

== History ==
Suttle is named for the family of James F. Suttle, who served as the postmaster in 1933. A post office operated under the name Felix from 1880 to 1933 and under the name Suttle from 1933 to 1973. James Suttle, who served on the Alabama Highway Commission as the Commissioner of Maintenance in 1923, operated a general store, cotton gin, and cotton farm in Suttle. He also operated a large dairy farm.

== Notable person ==
- David V. Jemison, father of T. J. Jemison. Served as President of the National Baptist Convention, USA, Inc. from 1940 to 1953. Preached at Bethany Church in Suttle from 1901 to 1903.
