= Perry County, Alabama =

County in Alabama, United States

- County
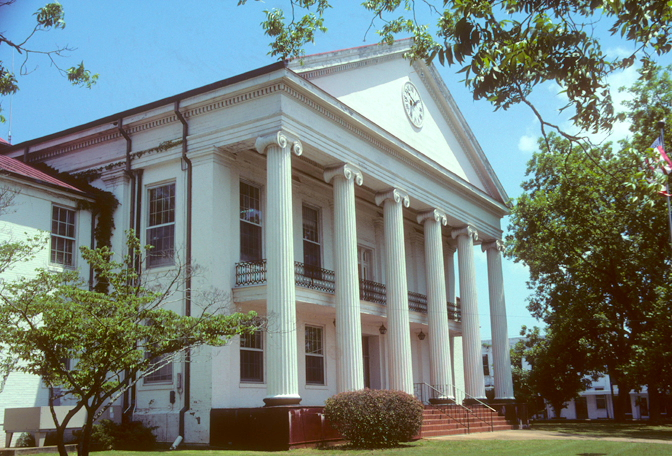
- Perry County Courthouse in Marion

- Seal

- Location within the U.S. state of Alabama
- Coordinates: 32°38′09″N 87°17′31″W
- Country: United States
- State: Alabama
- Founded: December 13, 1819
- Named for: Oliver Hazard Perry
- Seat: Marion
- Largest city: Marion

Area
  - Total: 724 sq mi (1,880 km^{2})
  - Land: 720 sq mi (1,900 km^{2})
  - Water: 4.2 sq mi (11 km^{2}) 0.6%

Population (2020)
  - Total: 8,511
  - Estimate (2025): 7,425 ▼
  - Density: 12/sq mi (4.6/km^{2})
- Time zone: UTC−6 (Central)
  - Summer (DST): UTC−5 (CDT)
- Congressional district: 7th
- Website: www.perrycountyal.gov/home
- County Number 53 on Alabama Licence Plates

Perry County is a county located in the Black Belt region in the central part of the U.S. state of Alabama. As of the 2020 census, the population was 8,511. Its county seat is Marion. The county was established in 1819 and is named in honor of Commodore Oliver Hazard Perry of Rhode Island and the United States Navy. As of 2020, Perry County was the only county in Alabama, and one of 40 in the United States, not to have access to any wired broadband connections.

== History ==
The Perry County town of Marion was the site of a 1965 killing of an unarmed Black man, Jimmie Lee Jackson, by a white state trooper, James Bonard Fowler, which sparked the Selma to Montgomery marches. In 2008, the county voted to establish a Barack Obama Day, a legal holiday, every second Monday of November.

== Geography ==
According to the United States Census Bureau, the county has a total area of 724 square miles (1,880 km^{2}), of which 720 square miles (1,900 km^{2}) is land and 4.2 square miles (11 km^{2}) (0.6%) is water. The county boasts a diverse geography, with the southern half of the county being located in the Gulf Coastal Plain region, and the northern half of the county being located in the far southern extensions of the foothills of the Ridge-and-Valley Appalachians. This area is mainly forested, with some hills and valleys.

=== Major highways ===
- U.S. Highway 80 / State Route 8 (unsigned)
- State Route 5
- State Route 14
- State Route 61
- State Route 175
- State Route 183
- State Route 219
- State Route 289

=== Adjacent counties ===
- Bibb County (north)
- Chilton County (northeast)
- Dallas County (east)
- Marengo County (southwest)
- Hale County (west)

=== National protected area ===
- Talladega National Forest (part)

== Demographics ==
Historical population
Census	Pop.	Note	%±
1820	3,646		—
1830	11,490		215.1%
1840	19,086		66.1%
1850	22,285		16.8%
1860	27,724		24.4%
1870	24,975		−9.9%
1880	30,741		23.1%
1890	29,332		−4.6%
1900	31,783		8.4%
1910	31,222		−1.8%
1920	25,373		−18.7%
1930	26,385		4.0%
1940	26,610		0.9%
1950	20,439		−23.2%
1960	17,358		−15.1%
1970	15,388		−11.3%
1980	15,012		−2.4%
1990	12,759		−15.0%
2000	11,861		−7.0%
2010	10,591		−10.7%
2020	8,511		−19.6%
2025 (est.)	7,425	▼	−12.8%
U.S. Decennial Census; 1790–1960 1900–1990; 1990–2000 2010–2020

=== Racial and ethnic composition ===
Perry County, Alabama – Racial and ethnic composition Note: the US Census treats Hispanic/Latino as an ethnic category. This table excludes Latinos from the racial categories and assigns them to a separate category. Hispanics/Latinos may be of any race.
Race / Ethnicity (NH = Non-Hispanic)	Pop 2000	Pop 2010	Pop 2020	% 2000	% 2010	% 2020
White alone (NH)	3,642	3,142	2,345	30.71%	29.67%	27.55%
Black or African American alone (NH)	8,057	7,244	5,914	67.93%	68.40%	69.49%
Native American or Alaska Native alone (NH)	9	17	15	0.08%	0.16%	0.18%
Asian alone (NH)	4	30	10	0.03%	0.28%	0.12%
Pacific Islander alone (NH)	2	5	1	0.02%	0.05%	0.01%
Other race alone (NH)	1	4	0	0.01%	0.04%	0.00%
Mixed race or Multiracial (NH)	44	35	137	0.37%	0.33%	1.61%
Hispanic or Latino (any race)	102	114	89	0.86%	1.08%	1.05%
Total	11,861	10,591	8,511	100.00%	100.00%	100.00%

=== 2020 census ===
As of the 2020 census, the county had a population of 8,511. The median age was 41.5 years. 20.8% of residents were under the age of 18 and 20.1% of residents were 65 years of age or older. For every 100 females there were 90.8 males, and for every 100 females age 18 and over there were 88.3 males age 18 and over.

The racial makeup of the county was 27.7% White, 69.7% Black or African American, 0.2% American Indian and Alaska Native, 0.1% Asian, 0.0% Native Hawaiian and Pacific Islander, 0.1% from some other race, and 2.1% from two or more races. Hispanic or Latino residents of any race comprised 1.0% of the population.

0.0% of residents lived in urban areas, while 100.0% lived in rural areas.

There were 3,360 households in the county, of which 30.9% had children under the age of 18 living with them and 43.8% had a female householder with no spouse or partner present. About 33.7% of all households were made up of individuals and 14.7% had someone living alone who was 65 years of age or older.

There were 3,933 housing units, of which 14.6% were vacant. Among occupied housing units, 67.4% were owner-occupied and 32.6% were renter-occupied. The homeowner vacancy rate was 1.5% and the rental vacancy rate was 7.2%.

Perry County was ranked as the county with the level of obesity by U.S. News & World Report, with a 52.5% obesity rate in 2024.

=== 2010 census ===
As of the 2010 United States census, there were 10,591 people living in the county. 68.7% were Black or African American, 30.3% White, 0.3% Asian, 0.2% Native American, 0.2% of some other race and 0.4% of two or more races. 1.1% were Hispanic or Latino (of any race).

=== 2000 census ===
As of the census of 2000, there were 11,861 people, 4,333 households, and 3,046 families living in the county. The population density was 16 people per square mile (6.2 people/km^{2}). There were 5,406 housing units at an average density of 8 units per square mile (3.1 units/km^{2}). The racial makeup of the county was 68.38% Black or African American, 30.86% White, 0.08% Native American, 0.03% Asian, 0.03% Pacific Islander, 0.08% from other races, and 0.54% from two or more races. Nearly 0.86% of the population were Hispanic or Latino of any race.

There were 4,333 households, out of which 33.80% had children under the age of 18 living with them, 40.40% were married couples living together, 25.10% had a female householder with no husband present, and 29.70% were non-families. Nearly 27.90% of all households were made up of individuals, and 12.00% had someone living alone who was 65 years of age or older. The average household size was 2.63, and the average family size was 3.23.

In the county, the population was spread out, with 29.80% under the age of 18, 11.10% from 18 to 24, 23.60% from 25 to 44, 20.70% from 45 to 64, and 14.90% who were 65 years of age or older. The median age was 33 years. For every 100 females, there were 83.90 males. For every 100 females age 18 and over, there were 78.40 males.

The median income for a household in the county was $20,200, and the median income for a family was $26,150. Males had a median income of $26,272 versus $16,839 for females. The per capita income for the county was $10,948. About 31.20% of families and 35.40% of the population were below the poverty line, including 48.90% of those under age 18 and 25.80% of those age 65 or over.

== Politics ==
Perry County is a heavily Democratic county like most of the Black Belt in Alabama. The last Republican to win the county was Richard Nixon in 1972 who won the county by only 82 votes.

United States presidential election results for Perry County, Alabama
Year	Republican		Democratic		Third party(ies)	
Year	No.	%	No.	%	No.	%
1824	58	15.68%	252	68.11%	60	16.22%
1828	58	8.36%	636	91.64%	0	0.00%
1832	0	0.00%	504	100.00%	0	0.00%
1836	827	74.04%	290	25.96%	0	0.00%
1840	973	54.12%	825	45.88%	0	0.00%
1844	869	50.58%	849	49.42%	0	0.00%
1848	826	56.69%	631	43.31%	0	0.00%
1852	261	33.21%	512	65.14%	13	1.65%
1856	0	0.00%	808	49.51%	824	50.49%
1860	0	0.00%	99	5.29%	1,773	94.71%
1868	3,733	73.63%	1,337	26.37%	0	0.00%
1872	4,143	74.96%	1,384	25.04%	0	0.00%
1876	3,528	70.63%	1,467	29.37%	0	0.00%
1880	2,082	47.75%	2,278	52.25%	0	0.00%
1884	1,079	23.45%	3,508	76.23%	15	0.33%
1888	790	22.45%	2,729	77.55%	0	0.00%
1892	48	1.13%	3,452	81.26%	748	17.61%
1896	463	14.52%	2,682	84.10%	44	1.38%
1900	80	4.31%	1,748	94.18%	28	1.51%
1904	47	5.00%	799	85.00%	94	10.00%
1908	12	1.52%	776	97.98%	4	0.51%
1912	3	0.39%	731	93.84%	45	5.78%
1916	20	2.16%	895	96.44%	13	1.40%
1920	34	2.74%	1,195	96.14%	14	1.13%
1924	25	2.59%	928	96.17%	12	1.24%
1928	459	26.97%	1,242	72.97%	1	0.06%
1932	37	2.54%	1,382	95.05%	35	2.41%
1936	24	1.55%	1,527	98.45%	0	0.00%
1940	39	2.51%	1,509	97.17%	5	0.32%
1944	47	4.46%	1,004	95.35%	2	0.19%
1948	30	2.78%	0	0.00%	1,051	97.22%
1952	756	35.80%	1,352	64.02%	4	0.19%
1956	613	33.83%	974	53.75%	225	12.42%
1960	744	41.52%	973	54.30%	75	4.19%
1964	2,046	79.73%	0	0.00%	520	20.27%
1968	308	5.55%	2,457	44.25%	2,788	50.21%
1972	2,800	49.13%	2,718	47.69%	181	3.18%
1976	2,164	32.38%	4,486	67.13%	33	0.49%
1980	2,262	34.68%	4,208	64.52%	52	0.80%
1984	2,600	48.08%	2,731	50.50%	77	1.42%
1988	2,107	36.59%	3,574	62.07%	77	1.34%
1992	1,829	31.46%	3,712	63.86%	272	4.68%
1996	1,703	28.85%	4,053	68.66%	147	2.49%
2000	1,732	29.93%	4,020	69.47%	35	0.60%
2004	1,738	31.47%	3,767	68.21%	18	0.33%
2008	1,679	27.26%	4,457	72.37%	23	0.37%
2012	1,506	24.68%	4,568	74.87%	27	0.44%
2016	1,407	26.66%	3,824	72.45%	47	0.89%
2020	1,339	25.60%	3,860	73.80%	31	0.59%
2024	1,269	28.42%	3,174	71.09%	22	0.49%

United States Senate election results for Perry County, Alabama2
Year	Republican		Democratic		Third party(ies)	
Year	No.	%	No.	%	No.	%
2020	1,274	24.42%	3,943	75.58%	0	0.00%

United States Senate election results for Perry County, Alabama3
Year	Republican		Democratic		Third party(ies)	
Year	No.	%	No.	%	No.	%
2022	898	28.27%	2,224	70.03%	54	1.70%

Alabama Gubernatorial election results for Perry County
Year	Republican		Democratic		Third party(ies)	
Year	No.	%	No.	%	No.	%
2022	942	29.58%	2,187	68.67%	56	1.76%

== Communities ==
=== Cities ===
- Marion (county seat)
- Uniontown

=== Unincorporated communities ===
- Adler
- Augustin
- Folsom
- Hamburg
- Heiberger
- Jericho
- Levert
- Morgan Springs
- Oakmulgee
- Osborn
- Perryville
- Radford
- Sprott
- Suttle
- Vaiden
- Vilula

== Places of interest ==
Perry County is home to Perry Lakes Park, part of the Talladega National Forest and Marion Military Institute. The campus of the now closed Judson College is also located in Perry County.

== See also ==
- Perry County School District
- National Register of Historic Places listings in Perry County, Alabama
- Properties on the Alabama Register of Landmarks and Heritage in Perry County, Alabama
