= Folsom, Perry County, Alabama =

Unincorporated community in Brownsville, Alabama

Folsom, Alabama
- Unincorporated community
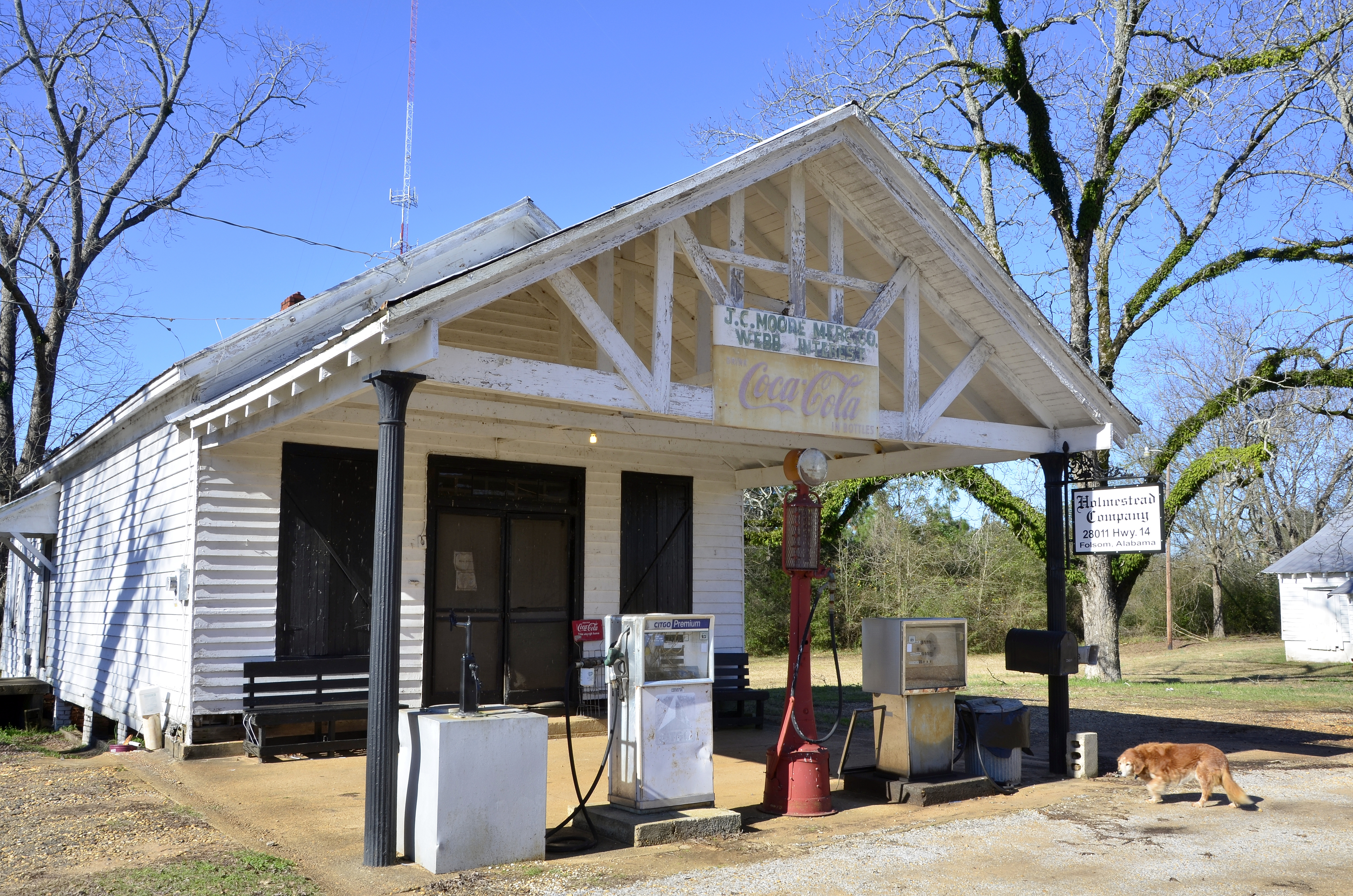
- Abandoned gas station and store in Folsom

- Location within Alabama Location within the United States
- Coordinates: 32°40′57″N 87°24′21″W
- Country: United States
- State: Alabama
- County: Perry
- Elevation: 430 ft (130 m)
- Time zone: UTC-6 (Central (CST))
  - Summer (DST): UTC-5 (CDT)
- Area code: 334
- GNIS feature ID: 156363

Folsom, also spelled Folsolm, is an unincorporated community in Perry County, Alabama, United States.

== History ==
Folsom was originally named Cleveland Beat and was a voting precinct during Grover Cleveland's first presidency. The name was then changed to Folsom in honor of Cleveland's wife, Frances Folsom. A post office operated under the name Folsom from 1887 to 1904.
