= Veto, Alabama =

Unincorporated community in Alabama, United States

- Unincorporated community
- Location within Alabama Location within the United States
- Coordinates: 34°59′40″N 86°59′20″W
- Country: United States
- State: Alabama
- County: Limestone
- Elevation: 659 ft (201 m)
- Time zone: UTC-6 (Central (CST))
  - Summer (DST): UTC-5 (CDT)
- Area code: 256
- GNIS feature ID: 128443

Veto is an unincorporated community in northern Limestone County, Alabama, United States.

== History ==
Veto was originally known as State Line. The community was then known as Veto, named after a community of the same name located immediately across the state line in Tennessee. A post office was established under the name State Line from 1875 to 1877. A post office was then operated under the name Veto from 1882 to 1955. Veto is the northern terminus for the Richard Martin Trail.

== Demographics ==
Historical population
Census	Pop.	Note	%±
1880	69		—
U.S. Decennial Census

Veto was one of four unincorporated communities listed in Limestone County on the 1880 U.S. Census, with a population of 69. The other three communities were Mount Rozell (39), Pettusville (88), and Salem (45). This was the only time these communities were listed on the census rolls.

== Notable people ==
- Dick Coffman, former Major League Baseball middle relief pitcher
- Slick Coffman, younger brother of Dick Coffman and former Major League Baseball pitcher
