= Pettusville, Alabama =

Unincorporated community in Alabama, United States

- Unincorporated community
- Location within Alabama Location within the United States
- Coordinates: 34°58′18″N 86°56′46″W
- Country: United States
- State: Alabama
- County: Limestone
- Elevation: 886 ft (270 m)
- Time zone: UTC-6 (Central (CST))
  - Summer (DST): UTC-5 (CDT)
- Area codes: 256 & 938
- GNIS feature ID: 124660

Pettusville is an unincorporated community in Limestone County, Alabama, United States.

Pettusville has a historical marker the reads:

Pettusville was named for Dr. Thomas Coleman Pettus (1816-1890) who came from Lunenburg Co., Virginia and purchased land that encompassed Bailes Hollow in the late 1840s. Dr. Pettus discovered seven "medicinal springs” deep in the hollow. The most famous was a chalybeate (iron rich) spring thought to restore the weary and cure a host of ailments. Coming to Pettusville to drink the water became so popular that the large home built of yellow poplar logs Pettus built for himself on a ridge above the spring was turned into a hotel to accommodate the visitors. The cool sweet-tasting water of the chalybeate spring brought crowds to the little community beginning in the 1850s. The town was incorporated and established one of the first schools in the county. It offered the services of several doctors. A Masonic Lodge, and post office were established there. After the war the hotel and spring were sold to numerous owners. In November of 1926 the old hotel building caught fire and burned to the ground.
