= Slick Coffman =

American baseball player (1910–2003)

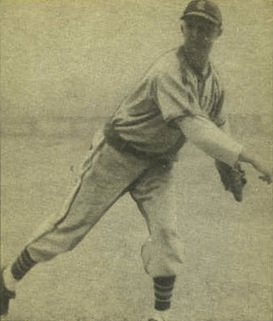
- Pitcher
- Born: December 11, 1910; Veto, Alabama, U.S.
- Died: May 8, 2003 (aged 92); Birmingham, Alabama, U.S.
- Batted: Right Threw: Right

MLB debut
- May 21, 1937, for the Detroit Tigers

Last MLB appearance
- September 17, 1940, for the St. Louis Browns

MLB statistics
- Win–loss record: 15–12
- Earned run average: 5.60
- Strikeouts: 89
- Stats at Baseball Reference

Teams
- Detroit Tigers (1937–1939); St. Louis Browns (1940)

George David "Slick" Coffman (December 11, 1910 – May 8, 2003) was an American baseball pitcher. He played 18 years of professional baseball, including four years in Major League Baseball with the Detroit Tigers (1937–1939) and St. Louis Browns (1940). In his major league debut in May 1937, Coffman won in an 11-inning, 4–2 pitching duel with Lefty Grove. Coffman compiled a career record of 15–12 in 313 2/3 innings pitched with a 5.60 earned run average.

== Biography ==
=== Early years ===
Coffman was born in Veto, Alabama, a "little town about 25 feet south of the Tennessee state line." He graduated from high school in Athens, Alabama. Coffman's older brother, Dick Coffman, was a major league pitcher for 15 seasons. The older brother made his major league debut in April 1927 while "Slick" was a 16-year-old high school student.

=== Minor leagues ===
After graduating from high school, Coffman played semi-professional baseball with the local team in Athens, a member of the Bee Line League. After one year with Athens, he played with minor league team in Montgomery, Alabama, and Dothan in the South Atlantic League. He won 12 games and lost 10 in 1934 for the Charleroi Tigers in the Pennsylvania State Association.

Coffman's pitching ultimately drew the attention of major league scouts, and he was signed by the Detroit Tigers. In 1935, Coffman was assigned to the Charleston Senators in the Middle Atlantic League. Despite an 8–13 record in 1935, Coffman's 2.87 earned run average and his fastball showed promise. In September 1935, the Tigers announced that Coffman would report to Beaumont, Texas for the 1936 season. At the time, the Charleston Daily Mail summarized Coffman's performance and prospects as follows:

"Coming from a southern family that has already produced one big league pitcher, Coffman has a thorough knowledge of his position. His blazing fast ball is his biggest threat and it has enabled him to strike out 161 batters this year while walking 82. While his control isn't as good as Twardy's, it is good enough considering he is a fast ball pitcher."

In 1936, Coffman won 13 games and lost 12 for Beaumont. Coffman later recalled, "I had a fine season with Beaumont, and expected to make this my last season in the minors, for a spell." After the final game at Beaumont, the Tigers called three players up to the majors -- Birdie Tebbetts, George Gill and Coffman.

=== Detroit Tigers ===
In 1937, Coffman attended spring training with the Tigers, and as he later recalled, "this time I intended to stay with the big club." During the 1937 spring training sessions, he developed a "reputation of being a big talker and a fierce competitor." On the trip to Detroit following spring training, the Tigers played an exhibition game in Cincinnati. Coffman combined with All-Stars Schoolboy Rowe and Tommy Bridges for a shutout. Despite his performance against Cincinnati, Detroit manager Mickey Cochrane told him after the game, "We are sending you to Toledo." After unsuccessfully arguing that he had earned a spot on the Tigers' roster, Coffman told Cochrane, "I'll go to Toledo, but mark my word, I'll be back up in less than 30 days." At Toledo, Coffman won six games for the Mud Hens, leading the Toledo Blade to report: "This 21-year-old right-handed pitcher of the Toledo Mud Hens is proving one of the sensations of the season in the American Association.""

Coffman was promptly called up to Detroit and joined the Tigers in Philadelphia, and Cochrane told Coffman that he would pitch the first game of a series in Boston. In Boston, Coffman recalled that the newspaper headlines reported that "the young upstart from the cotton fields of Alabama would pitch against the incomparable Lefty Grove." On the day of his debut, Cochrane came into the clubhouse and announced that Eldon Auker would start the game. Coffman complained to Cochrane, "But Mickey you told me I would pitch today, and I'm prepared to do just that." Cochrane responded, "I don't care what I told you. Go out there and bring somebody in like Schoolboy Rowe. Grove's pitching today and I want you to get off to a better start...you know we never score many runs off him." Coffman replied, "Well let me tell you Mickey they won't score many runs off of me, either." Coffman recalled that this was all Cochrane was waiting for, and he slammed his fist on a table and exclaimed, "OK kid I'll catch you." In his first big league start, Coffman got the win against Grove, as the Tigers beat Boston, 4–2. Coffman and Grove both pitched complete games, and Coffman allowed eight hits in 11 innings; he also had a hit in Detroit's 11th inning rally. The Associated Press account of the game opened as follows: "Youthful George (Slick) Coffman, making his big-league debut with the Detroit Tigers, today pitched his teammates to an 11-inning 4 to 2 victory over the Boston Red Sox."

For the remainder of the 1937 season, Coffman was used principally as a reliever by the Tigers, appearing in 28 games, but only five as a starter. He compiled a record of 7–5 in 101 innings pitched with a 4.37 earned run average.

In 1938, Coffman continued in his role as a relief pitcher for Detroit. His 39 games was ninth most in the American League, and only six of his appearances were as a starter. He finished the 1938 season with a record of 4–4 and an earned run average of 6.02 in 95 2/3 innings pitched.

When Coffman entered a game in 1938, one of the local writers grabbed the announcer's microphone and drawled, "Gawge (Slick) Coffman now pitchin' fuh Dee-troit." Coffman reportedly had "an accent thicker than Judge Landis' hair."

Coffman was with the Tigers in June 1939 when Lou Gehrig was pulled from the Yankees lineup in a game at Briggs Stadium. Coffman recalled, "Gehrig took infield practice as always that day and many fans were unaware that a historic event was about to take place. We had already been informed by Manager Del Baker that Lou would not play. When the announcement was made that Gehrig was being removed from the lineup it shook a sellout crowd up like nothing before had ever done. They gave the Ole Iron Horse a standing ovation which one would have to see to believe."

=== St. Louis Browns ===
After the 1939 season, the Tigers traded Coffman. He was initially traded with Benny McCoy to the Philadelphia Athletics for outfielder Wally Moses. However, the trade was cancelled when Judge Landis declared several Detroit players, including McCoy, to be free agents. After the first trade fell apart, Coffman was traded to the St. Louis Browns for catcher Billy Sullivan.

Recognizing that Coffman was angry over the Tigers' decision to trade him, the Browns' manager designated Coffman as the Browns' starting pitcher on opening day in April 1940. In front of nearly 50,000 Detroit fans, Coffman beat Detroit's Bobo Newsom. One newspaper account reported, "The day's biggest turnout, 49,417 customers at Detroit, had to watch their Tigers take a 5-1 lashing by the St. Louis Browns behind the seven-hit hurling of George 'Slick' Coffman, whom Detroit discarded during the winter."

=== Second run in minor leagues ===
Coffman played only one season for the Browns, but he remained active in baseball for another decade. He continued to play in the American Association and Pacific Coast League until 1949. His longest stint was five years with the St. Paul Saints in 1942 and 1945–1948. He finished his professional baseball career playing three games for the Toledo Mud Hens in 1949 at age 38. Overall, he went 63–74 in the minor leagues to go along with a 15–12 major league record.

=== Later years ===
In 1949, Coffman was hired by his former Detroit roommate Hank Greenberg to manage a minor league club in the Cleveland Indians organization. He later scouted for the Indians until a back injury forced him to retire from baseball.

Coffman reportedly "loved baseball and loved to talk." In 1953, Coffman attended a game in Detroit and was talking to Ted Williams when a photographer took their picture. The photograph appeared in the newspaper the next day with the caption, "A baseball oddity, Ted Williams with his eyes closed and Slick Coffman with his mouth shut."

Coffman died in 2003 at age 92 in Birmingham, Alabama.
