= French Mill, Alabama =

Unincorporated community in Alabama, United States

French Mill
- Unincorporated community
- Location within Alabama Location within the United States
- Coordinates: 34°47′38″N 86°51′55″W
- Country: United States
- State: Alabama
- County: Limestone
- Elevation: 663 ft (202 m)

Population
  - Metro: 514,465 (US: 109th)
- Time zone: UTC-6 (Central (CST))
  - Summer (DST): UTC-5 (CDT)
- Area code: 256
- GNIS feature ID: 156381

French Mill is an unincorporated community located in Limestone County. It is halfway between the cities of Madison and Athens. French Mill is within the Huntsville Metropolitan Area, and is considered an exurb of the city despite Huntsville being located just south of the community.
