= Richard Martin Trail =

Multi-use rail trail in Limestone County, Alabama

- Length: 10.2 miles (16.4 km)
- Location: North Limestone County, Alabama, USA
- Designation: National Recreation Trail in 2010
- Trailheads: North: Veto Rd. TN state line South: Piney Chapel Rd.
- Use: Bicycles, pedestrian, horseback
- Highest point: 831 feet (253 m)
- Lowest point: 662 feet (202 m)
- Difficulty: Easy
- Season: All year
- Sights: Battle of Sulphur Creek Trestle, Town of Elkmont
- Surface: Crushed rock
- Right of way: Seaboard System Railroad
- Website: Rails to Trails North and south trailheads in Alabama

The Richard Martin Trail or the Richard Martin Rails-to-Trail is a multi-use rail trail open to hikers, walkers, runners, and bicycle and horseback riders in Limestone County, Alabama built on an abandoned rail corridor as part of the Rails-to-Trails Conservancy. The 10.2-mile trail winds through wetlands, the Civil War site Battle of Sulphur Creek Trestle and downtown Elkmont, Alabama. It was named in honor of Richard Martin, local citizen and trail supporter, who led the effort to build the trail for 25 years.

== History ==
The railroad was built in 1859 by the Tennessee and Alabama Central Railroad linking Nashville, Tennessee and Decatur, Alabama. The railroad right-of-way was abandoned in April 1986. Limestone County Parks and Recreation Board (established in 1992) adopted the efforts of Richard Martin to create the trail and its trail heads. Under the Limestone County Parks and Recreation Board purview, the historic church was relocated to the northern head at Veto and parking and restrooms were built; Coffman Park parking and pavilion were built; and upgrades were made at the Elkmont centerpoint to include horse trailer parking, additional egress points, and trail maintenance such as grading, repair, and anti-motorized vehicle barriers. Limestone County Parks and Recreation saved the historic church from demolition in 2006.

== Features ==
The Veto trailhead includes the restoration of a 19th-century community church and restroom facilities. The Piney Chapel trailhead offers a pavilion with restrooms, parking lot for vehicles/horse trailers, and hitching posts.

== Locations ==
Locations along the trails are listed in north to south order.

Description	Coordinates
North trailhead on Veto Road at Alabama-Tennessee state line	34.9942°N 86.9883°W
Elkmont at Upper Fort Hampton Road	34.92900°N 86.97331°W
South trailhead at Coffman Mitchell Park (19779 Piney Chapel Road, Athens, Alabama 35614)	34.8484°N 86.9695°W

== See also ==
- List of Hiking Trails in Alabama
