= Dick Coffman =

American baseball player (1906-1972)

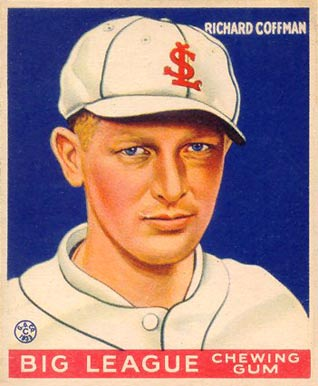
- Pitcher
- Born: December 18, 1906; Veto, Alabama, US
- Died: March 24, 1972 (aged 65); Athens, Alabama, US
- Batted: Right Threw: Right

MLB debut
- April 28, 1927, for the Washington Senators

Last MLB appearance
- June 28, 1945, for the Philadelphia Phillies

MLB statistics
- Win–loss record: 72–95
- Earned run average: 4.65
- Strikeouts: 372
- Saves: 38
- Stats at Baseball Reference

Teams
- Washington Senators (1927); St. Louis Browns (1928–1932); Washington Senators (1932); St. Louis Browns (1933–1935); New York Giants (1936–1939); Boston Bees (1940); Philadelphia Phillies (1945)

Samuel Richard Coffman (December 18, 1906 – March 24, 1972) was an American Major League Baseball pitcher with the Washington Senators, St. Louis Browns, New York Giants, Boston Bees and Philadelphia Phillies between 1927 and 1945. Coffman batted and threw right-handed. He was born in Veto, Alabama. Coffman's brother, Slick, also pitched in the major leagues.

== Career ==
In a 15-season career, Coffman posted a 72–95 record with a 4.65 ERA and 38 saves in 472 appearances (132 as a starter). In 1938, he led the National League in appearances (51), saves (12) and games finished (35). His only ejection in Major League Baseball (MLB) came on August 15, 1934, when he was ejected by homeplate umpire Harry Geisel for arguing balls and strikes.

== Death ==
Coffman died in Athens, Alabama, at the age of 65.

== See also ==
- List of Major League Baseball annual saves leaders

== Sources ==
- Career statistics from MLB · Baseball Reference · Baseball Reference (Minors) · Retrosheet · Baseball Almanac
