= Holland Gin, Alabama =

Unincorporated community in Alabama, United States

- Unincorporated community
- Location within Alabama Location within the United States
- Coordinates: 34°57′48″N 86°53′14″W
- Country: United States
- State: Alabama
- County: Limestone
- Elevation: 899 ft (274 m)
- Time zone: UTC-6 (Central (CST))
  - Summer (DST): UTC-5 (CDT)
- Area code: 256
- GNIS feature ID: 156487

Holland Gin is an unincorporated community in Limestone County, Alabama, in the United States. Holland Gin was named for a cotton gin operated by a father and son, Hezzie and Egbert Holland.
