= Coxey, Alabama =

Unincorporated community in Alabama, United States

- Unincorporated community
- Location within Alabama Location within the United States
- Coordinates: 34°48′07″N 87°10′42″W
- Country: United States
- State: Alabama
- County: Limestone
- Elevation: 669 ft (204 m)
- Time zone: UTC-6 (Central (CST))
  - Summer (DST): UTC-5 (CDT)
- Area code: 256
- GNIS feature ID: 116794

Coxey is an unincorporated community in western Limestone County, Alabama, United States. It is located on U.S. Route 72, 12.0 miles (19.3 km) west of Athens.

== History ==
Coxey is most likely named after the first postmaster, William Cox. A post office operated under the name Coxey from 1918 to 1937.
