= Osborn, Alabama =

Unincorporated community in Brownsville, Alabama

- Unincorporated community
- Location within Alabama Location within the United States
- Coordinates: 32°41′01″N 87°08′35″W
- Country: United States
- State: Alabama
- County: Perry
- Elevation: 469 ft (143 m)
- Time zone: UTC-6 (Central (CST))
  - Summer (DST): UTC-5 (CDT)
- Area code: 334
- GNIS feature ID: 160322

Osborn, also known as Osburn, is an unincorporated community in Perry County, Alabama, United States. A post office operated under the name Osburn from 1903 to 1905.
