= 1832 United States presidential election in Alabama =

- November 2 – December 5, 1832
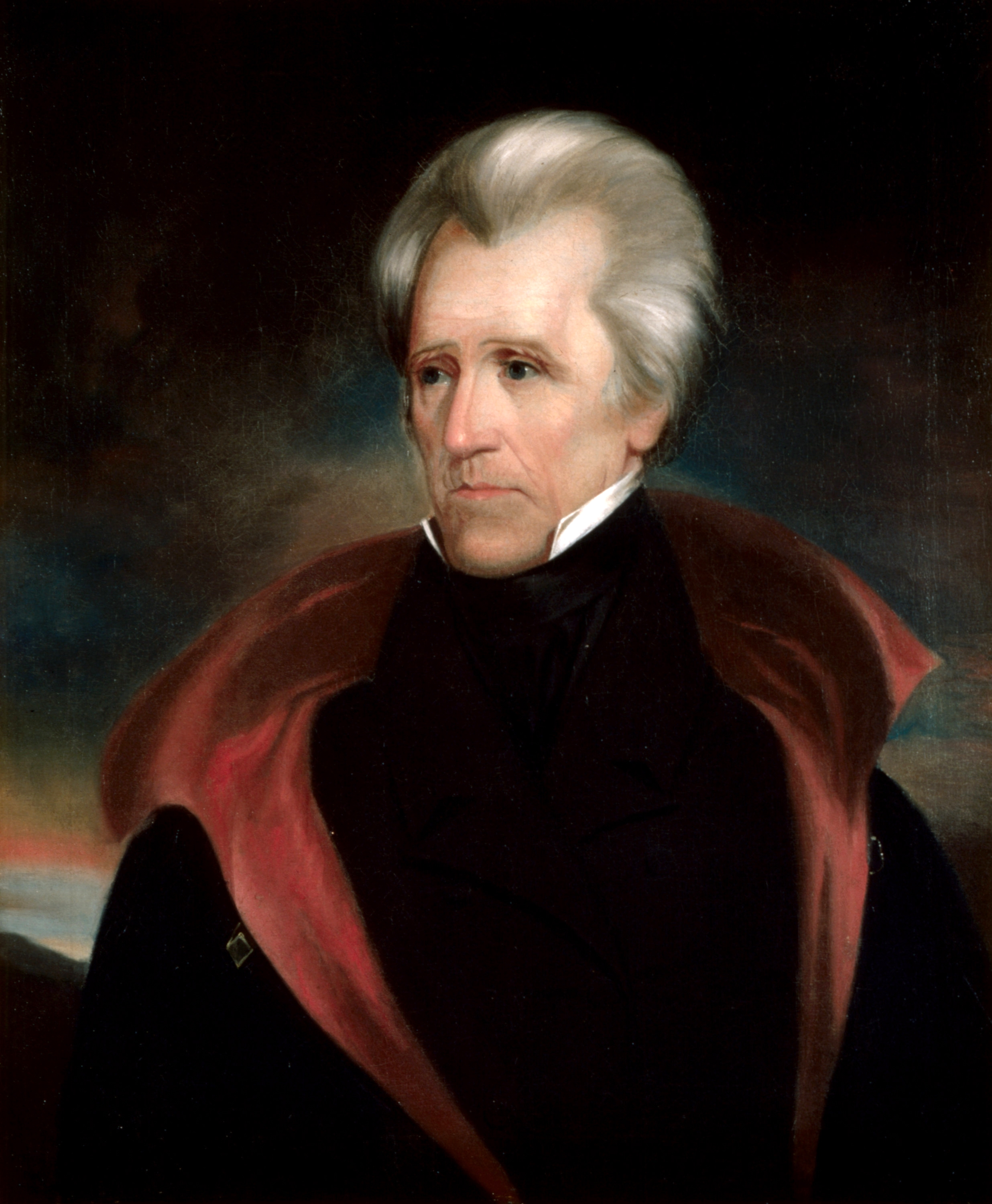

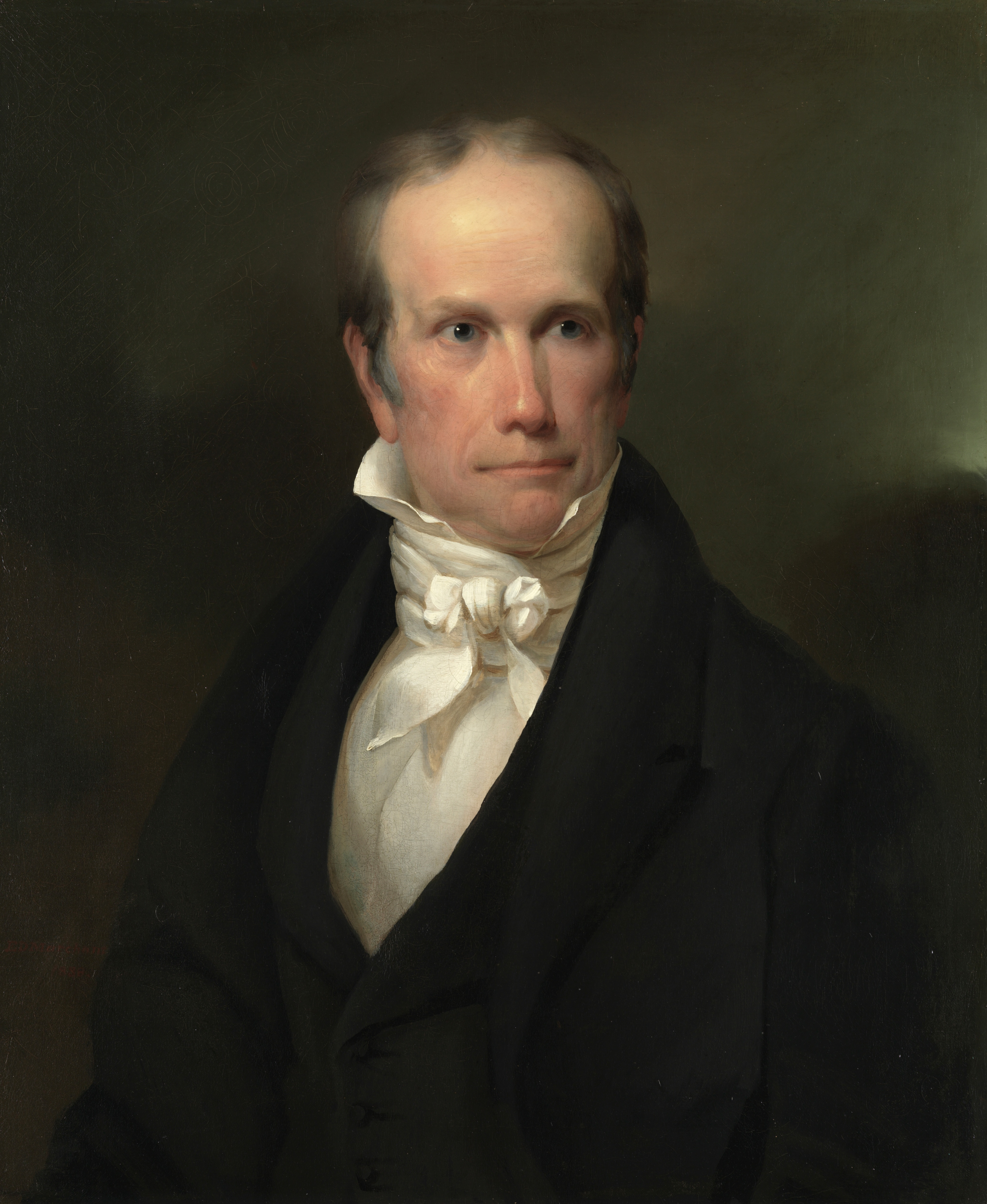
Nominee	Andrew Jackson	Henry Clay
Party	Democratic	National Republican
Home state	Tennessee	Kentucky
Running mate	Martin Van Buren	John Sergeant
Electoral vote	7	0
Popular vote	14,286	5
Percentage	99.97%	0.03%
County results
Jackson
90–100%
President before election
John Quincy Adams
Democratic-Republican
Elected President
Andrew Jackson
Democratic

The 1832 United States presidential election in Alabama took place between November 2 and December 5, 1832, as part of the 1832 United States presidential election. Voters chose seven representatives, or electors, to the Electoral College, who voted for president and vice president.

Alabama voted for the Democratic candidate, Andrew Jackson, over the National Republican candidate, Henry Clay. Jackson won Alabama by a margin of 99.97%.

== Results ==
1832 United States presidential election in Alabama
Party	Candidate	Votes	Percentage	Electoral votes
Democratic	Andrew Jackson (incumbent)	14,286	99.97%	7
National Republican	Henry Clay	5	0.03%	0
Totals		14,291	100.00%	7

=== Results by county ===
1832 United States Presidential Election in Alabama (by county)
County	Andrew Jackson (Note: The Jackson vote was split between two tickets. One listed Martin Van Buren for vice president, and the other one listed James Barbour for vice president. The totals of both tickets are included together in most county data.) Democratic		Henry Clay National Republican		Total votes cast
County	#	%	#	%	Total votes cast
Bibb	249	100.00%	0	0.00%	249
Blount	443	100.00%	0	0.00%	443
Butler	391	100.00%	0	0.00%	391
Clarke	323	100.00%	0	0.00%	323
Conecuh	200	100.00%	0	0.00%	200
Covington	100	100.00%	0	0.00%	100
Dallas	278	100.00%	0	0.00%	278
Fayette	320	100.00%	0	0.00%	278
Franklin	601	99.17%	5	0.83%	606
Greene	1,082	100.00%	0	0.00%	1,082
Jackson	1,045	100.00%	0	0.00%	1,045
Jefferson	383	100.00%	0	0.00%	383
Lauderdale	729	100.00%	0	0.00%	729
Lawrence	1,079	100.00%	0	0.00%	1,079
Limestone	912	100.00%	0	0.00%	912
Lowndes	421	100.00%	0	0.00%	421
Madison	1,451	100.00%	0	0.00%	1,451
Marengo	499	100.00%	0	0.00%	499
Marion	257	100.00%	0	0.00%	257
Mobile	331	100.00%	0	0.00%	331
Monroe	336	100.00%	0	0.00%	336
Montgomery	783	100.00%	0	0.00%	783
Morgan	531	100.00%	0	0.00%	531
Perry	504	100.00%	0	0.00%	504
Pickens	444	100.00%	0	0.00%	444
Shelby	380	100.00%	0	0.00%	380
St. Clair	605	100.00%	0	0.00%	605
Tuscaloosa	428	100.00%	0	0.00%	428
Washington	164	100.00%	0	0.00%	164
Wilcox	642	100.00%	0	0.00%	642
Totals	15,908 (Note: Given total is 13,739 for Jackson/Van Buren and 2,169 for Jackson/Barbour.)	99.97%	5	0.03%	15,913

== See also ==
- United States presidential elections in Alabama
