= Limestone County, Alabama =

County in the United States

- County
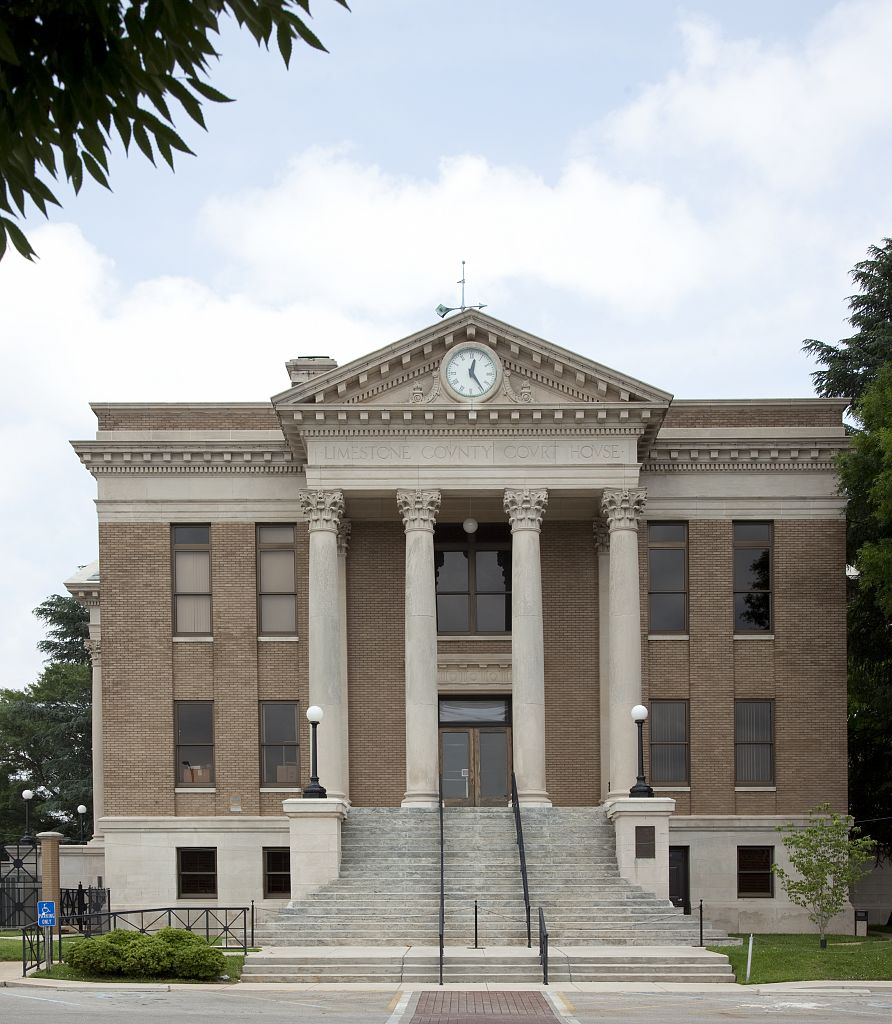
- Limestone County Courthouse in Athens

- Seal Logo

- Location within the U.S. state of Alabama
- Coordinates: 34°48′40″N 86°59′03″W
- Country: United States
- State: Alabama
- Founded: February 6, 1818
- Named for: Limestone Creek
- Seat: Athens
- Largest city: Athens (Note: While Huntsville is technically the largest city, most inhabitants live outside Limestone County; making Athens the largest city inside the actual county.)

Government
  - Chairman: Collin Daly

Area
  - Total: 607 sq mi (1,570 km^{2})
  - Land: 560 sq mi (1,500 km^{2})
  - Water: 47 sq mi (120 km^{2}) 7.8%

Population (2020)
  - Total: 103,570
  - Estimate (2025): 122,928 ▲
  - Density: 180/sq mi (71/km^{2})
- Time zone: UTC−6 (Central)
  - Summer (DST): UTC−5 (CDT)
- Congressional district: 5th
- Website: limestonecounty-al.gov
- County Number 44 on Alabama Licence Plates

Limestone County is a county of the U.S. state of Alabama. As of the 2020 census, the county's population was 103,570. Its county seat is Athens. The county is named after Limestone Creek. Limestone County is included in the Huntsville Metropolitan Area.

== History ==
Limestone County was established by the Alabama Territorial legislature on February 6, 1818. On November 27, 1821, the Alabama State legislature passed an Act that altered the boundary of Limestone County to include the area east of the mouth of the Elk River with the Tennessee River. At the time, that area was a part of Lauderdale County.

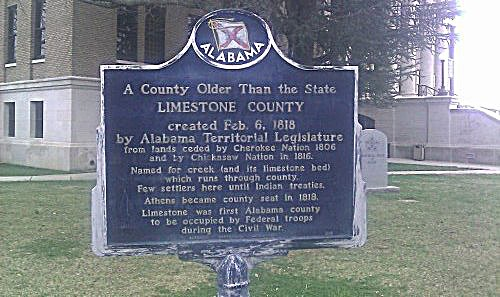
Historical marker on the northwest side of the courthouse

== Geography ==
According to the United States Census Bureau, the county has a total area of 607 square miles (1,570 km^{2}), of which 560 square miles (1,500 km^{2}) is land and 47 square miles (120 km^{2}) (7.8%) is water. It is the third smallest county in Alabama by land area.

=== River ===
- Tennessee River
- Elk River

=== Adjacent counties ===
- Giles County, Tennessee - north
- Lincoln County, Tennessee - northeast
- Madison County - east
- Morgan County - southeast
- Lawrence County - southwest
- Lauderdale County - west

=== National protected area ===
- Wheeler National Wildlife Refuge (part)

== Demographics ==
Historical population
Census	Pop.	Note	%±
1820	9,871		—
1830	14,807		50.0%
1840	14,374		−2.9%
1850	16,483		14.7%
1860	15,306		−7.1%
1870	15,017		−1.9%
1880	21,600		43.8%
1890	21,201		−1.8%
1900	22,387		5.6%
1910	26,880		20.1%
1920	31,341		16.6%
1930	36,629		16.9%
1940	35,642		−2.7%
1950	35,766		0.3%
1960	36,513		2.1%
1970	41,699		14.2%
1980	46,005		10.3%
1990	54,135		17.7%
2000	65,676		21.3%
2010	82,782		26.0%
2020	103,570		25.1%
2025 (est.)	122,928	▲	18.7%
U.S. Decennial Census; 1790–1960 1900–1990; 1990–2000 2010–2020

=== Racial and ethnic composition ===
Limestone County, Alabama – Racial and ethnic composition Note: the US Census treats Hispanic/Latino as an ethnic category. This table excludes Latinos from the racial categories and assigns them to a separate category. Hispanics/Latinos may be of any race.
Race / Ethnicity (NH = Non-Hispanic)	Pop 1980	Pop 1990	Pop 2000	Pop 2010	Pop 2020	% 1980	% 1990	% 2000	% 2010	% 2020
White alone (NH)	39,151	46,468	54,142	65,112	75,692	85.10%	85.84%	82.44%	78.65%	73.08%
Black or African American alone (NH)	6,479	7,106	8,703	10,350	13,177	14.08%	13.13%	13.25%	12.50%	12.72%
Native American or Alaska Native alone (NH)	36	144	293	487	458	0.08%	0.27%	0.45%	0.59%	0.44%
Asian alone (NH)	45	154	228	911	1,857	0.10%	0.28%	0.35%	1.10%	1.79%
Native Hawaiian or Pacific Islander alone (NH)	x	x	11	26	70	x	x	0.02%	0.03%	0.07%
Other race alone (NH)	11	2	28	83	319	0.02%	0.00%	0.04%	0.10%	0.31%
Mixed race or Multiracial (NH)	x	x	531	1,222	4,749	x	x	0.81%	1.48%	4.59%
Hispanic or Latino (any race)	283	261	1,740	4,591	7,248	0.62%	0.48%	2.65%	5.55%	7.00%
Total	46,005	54,135	65,676	82,782	103,570	100.00%	100.00%	100.00%	100.00%	100.00%

=== 2020 census ===
As of the 2020 census, the county had a population of 103,570. The median age was 39.9 years. 23.0% of residents were under the age of 18 and 15.8% of residents were 65 years of age or older. For every 100 females there were 99.9 males, and for every 100 females age 18 and over there were 99.3 males age 18 and over.

The racial makeup of the county was 74.4% White, 12.8% Black or African American, 0.7% American Indian and Alaska Native, 1.8% Asian, 0.1% Native Hawaiian and Pacific Islander, 3.7% from some other race, and 6.5% from two or more races. Hispanic or Latino residents of any race comprised 7.0% of the population.

49.0% of residents lived in urban areas, while 51.0% lived in rural areas.

There were 39,365 households in the county, of which 33.1% had children under the age of 18 living with them and 24.2% had a female householder with no spouse or partner present. About 24.7% of all households were made up of individuals and 10.2% had someone living alone who was 65 years of age or older.

There were 42,692 housing units, of which 7.8% were vacant. Among occupied housing units, 76.5% were owner-occupied and 23.5% were renter-occupied. The homeowner vacancy rate was 1.5% and the rental vacancy rate was 6.6%.

=== 2010 census ===
As of the 2010 census, there were 82,782 people, 31,446 households, and 22,876 families living in the county. The population density was 57.1/km^{2} (148/mi^{2}). There were 34,977 housing units at an average density of 24.1/km^{2} (62/mi^{2}). The racial makeup of the county was 80.3% White, 12.6% Black or African American, 0.7% Native American, 1.1% Asian, 0.1% Pacific Islander, 3.5% from other races, and 1.8% from two or more races. 5.5% of the population were Hispanic or Latino of any race.

There were 31,446 households, 31.4% had children under the age of 18 living with them, 57.0% were married couples living together, 11.4% had a female householder with no husband present, and 27.3% were non-families. 23.7% of households were one person and 8.5% were one person aged 65 or older. The average household size was 2.54 and the average family size was 3.00.

The age distribution was 24.0% under the age of 18, 8.0% from 18 to 24, 28.1% from 25 to 44, 27.6% from 45 to 64, and 12.3% 65 or older. The median age was 38.4 years. For every 100 females, there were 102.5 males. For every 100 females age 18 and over, there were 107.0 males.

The median household income in the county was $46,682, and the median family income was $55,518. Males had a median income of $46,071 versus $31,609 for females. The per capita income for the county was $24,007. About 10.3% of families and 13.5% of the population were below the poverty line, including 17.5% of those under age 18 and 11.0% of those age 65 or over.

=== 2000 census ===
As of the 2000 census, there were 65,676 people, 24,688 households, and 18,219 families living in the county. The population density was 45/km^{2} (120/mi^{2}). There were 26,897 housing units at an average density of 18/km^{2} (47/sq mi). The racial makeup of the county was 78.79% White, 15.33% Black or African American, 0.46% Native American, 0.35% Asian, 0.02% Pacific Islander, 1.14% from other races, and 0.91% from two or more races. 2.65% of the population were Hispanic or Latino of any race.

According to the census of 2000, the largest ancestry groups in Limestone County were English 66.31%, Scots-Irish 15.12%, and African 13.33%

There were 24,688 households, 34.80% had children under the age of 18 living with them, 60.00% were married couples living together, 10.40% had a female householder with no husband present, and 26.20% were non-families. 23.40% of households were one person and 8.90% were one person aged 65 or older. The average household size was 2.55 and the average family size was 3.02.

The age distribution was 24.90% under the age of 18, 8.80% from 18 to 24, 32.10% from 25 to 44, 23.10% from 45 to 64, and 11.10% 65 or older. The median age was 36 years. For every 100 females, there were 103.10 males. For every 100 females age 18 and over, there were 101.80 males.

The median household income in the county was $37,405, and the median family income was $45,146. Males had a median income of $35,743 versus $23,389 for females. The per capita income for the county was $17,782. About 9.80% of families and 12.30% of the population were below the poverty line, including 16.20% of those under age 18 and 14.60% of those age 65 or over.

== Government and politics ==
Limestone County comprises the 39th Judicial Circuit of Alabama. The 39th Judicial Circuit was created in the early 1980s when Limestone County broke away from Morgan County to form its own circuit.

The 39th Judicial Circuit has two circuit judges and two district judges. The two circuit judges are Judge B. Chadwick Wise and Judge Matthew R. Huggins. The two district judges are Judge David T. Puckett and Judge R. Gray West.

The current District Attorney is Brian C.T. Jones.

The current Sheriff of Limestone County is Joshua McLaughlin. The term for sheriffs is four years, and there is no term limit.

Collin Daly (R) is the Chairman of the County Commission.

Limestone County is reliably Republican at the presidential level. The last Democrat to win the county in a presidential election is Jimmy Carter, who won it by an absolute majority in 1980.

United States presidential election results for Limestone County, Alabama
Year	Republican		Democratic		Third party(ies)	
Year	No.	%	No.	%	No.	%
1824	20	4.06%	418	84.79%	55	11.16%
1828	73	7.16%	946	92.84%	0	0.00%
1832	0	0.00%	912	100.00%	0	0.00%
1836	319	30.85%	715	69.15%	0	0.00%
1840	356	28.41%	897	71.59%	0	0.00%
1844	325	25.19%	965	74.81%	0	0.00%
1848	374	30.99%	833	69.01%	0	0.00%
1852	227	25.53%	662	74.47%	0	0.00%
1856	0	0.00%	790	73.76%	281	26.24%
1860	0	0.00%	325	26.75%	890	73.25%
1868	355	23.17%	1,177	76.83%	0	0.00%
1872	893	51.95%	826	48.05%	0	0.00%
1876	1,343	44.37%	1,684	55.63%	0	0.00%
1880	1,623	49.50%	1,600	48.80%	56	1.71%
1884	1,450	49.56%	1,430	48.87%	46	1.57%
1888	1,183	43.93%	1,489	55.29%	21	0.78%
1892	18	0.54%	1,447	43.40%	1,869	56.06%
1896	1,520	44.94%	1,812	53.58%	50	1.48%
1900	1,157	50.68%	1,063	46.56%	63	2.76%
1904	187	14.88%	1,053	83.77%	17	1.35%
1908	238	16.38%	1,188	81.76%	27	1.86%
1912	90	7.38%	1,012	83.02%	117	9.60%
1916	92	5.84%	1,450	92.12%	32	2.03%
1920	285	13.48%	1,812	85.71%	17	0.80%
1924	136	8.40%	1,415	87.35%	69	4.26%
1928	407	19.42%	1,689	80.58%	0	0.00%
1932	107	3.85%	2,667	95.94%	6	0.22%
1936	108	3.61%	2,861	95.69%	21	0.70%
1940	95	3.12%	2,941	96.58%	9	0.30%
1944	129	4.70%	2,605	94.93%	10	0.36%
1948	112	5.65%	0	0.00%	1,870	94.35%
1952	549	12.46%	3,844	87.24%	13	0.30%
1956	589	12.40%	4,145	87.26%	16	0.34%
1960	991	19.26%	4,147	80.59%	8	0.16%
1964	2,377	43.99%	0	0.00%	3,027	56.01%
1968	870	8.39%	889	8.57%	8,616	83.05%
1972	6,188	73.21%	2,079	24.60%	185	2.19%
1976	2,997	24.98%	8,803	73.36%	200	1.67%
1980	4,574	34.18%	8,180	61.12%	630	4.71%
1984	8,423	60.12%	5,410	38.62%	177	1.26%
1988	9,086	61.56%	5,455	36.96%	219	1.48%
1992	9,862	45.66%	8,087	37.45%	3,648	16.89%
1996	10,862	52.52%	8,045	38.90%	1,775	8.58%
2000	14,204	60.10%	8,992	38.05%	438	1.85%
2004	19,702	67.77%	9,126	31.39%	245	0.84%
2008	23,598	70.33%	9,536	28.42%	417	1.24%
2012	25,295	71.17%	9,829	27.66%	416	1.17%
2016	29,067	72.14%	9,468	23.50%	1,759	4.37%
2020	34,640	70.36%	13,672	27.77%	923	1.87%
2024	37,887	71.04%	14,581	27.34%	864	1.62%

United States Senate election results for Limestone County, Alabama2
Year	Republican		Democratic		Third party(ies)	
Year	No.	%	No.	%	No.	%
2020	33,364	68.04%	15,584	31.78%	90	0.18%

United States Senate election results for Limestone County, Alabama3
Year	Republican		Democratic		Third party(ies)	
Year	No.	%	No.	%	No.	%
2022	23,422	74.74%	7,037	22.45%	881	2.81%

Alabama Gubernatorial election results for Limestone County
Year	Republican		Democratic		Third party(ies)	
Year	No.	%	No.	%	No.	%
2022	23,770	75.77%	6,289	20.05%	1,313	4.19%

== Education ==
School districts include:

- Limestone County School District operates public schools for students living in most areas of Limestone County not incorporated in the Cities of Athens, Decatur, Huntsville, and/or Madison.
- Athens City Schools - K-12 education for the city of Athens
- Decatur City Schools
- Huntsville City School District
- Madison City School District

Tertiary education:

- Calhoun Community College - two-year college located in the southern part of the county in Decatur
- Athens State University - two-year upper level university located in Athens

== Transportation ==
=== Major highways ===
- Interstate 65
- Interstate 565
- U.S. Highway 31 / State Route 3 (unsigned)
- U.S. Highway 72 / State Route 2 (unsigned)
- US 72 Alt.
- State Route 20
- State Route 53
- State Route 99
- State Route 127
- State Route 251

=== Railways ===
- CSX Transportation—freight line that runs North to South
- Norfolk Southern Railway—freight line that runs east–west

=== Airport ===
Huntsville International Airport (HSV) is the nearest major commercial airport, 23 miles east. Nashville Airport (BNA) is approximately 104 miles north.

== Recreation ==
- Antebellum Trail – a trail rich in the Antebellum period architecture that highlights Athens, Belle Mina and Mooresville.
- Ardmore Walking Tracks – One .25 miles (0.40 km) walking track is located in Ardmore Town Park on Park Avenue. The other 0.5 miles (0.80 km) track is locating in Ardmore's John Barns Park on Ardmore Ridge Road
- Athens Greenway Walking Trail – This 3.3 miles (5.3 km) walking trail starts at the Athens SportsPlex goes by Athens High School and Athens Public Archery Range and continues to U.S. Highway 72 for an additional 1.2 miles (1.9 km)
- Athens Historic Volksmarch – An American Volksport Association (AVA) sanctioned 10K (6.2 miles) walk.
- Beaty Historic District Walking Tour "Step Back In Time" – walking tour of the Robert Beaty Historic District which was placed on the Registry of Historic Places in 1984.
- Civil War Trail – Driving/walking trail highlighting the history of the Civil War in the greater Limestone County community.
- Cowford Landing – swimming, fishing, and boating.
- The Glory Road – Driving tour of historic and community churches of Limestone County
- Limestone County Canoe and Kayak Trail – a 21.9 miles (35.2 km) along the Elk River for canoeing with five access sites. Designated a National Recreation Trail in 2010.
- Noah Bike and Vintage Car Trail – a road route for bicycles, motorcycles, and vintage cars in Northwest Limestone County that is 89 miles (143 km) long. The starts and ends at the Athens-Limestone Visitor Center at 34.803°N 86.967°W.
- Richard Martin Trail – a 10.2 miles (16.4 km) rail trail in northern part of the county for bicycling, horseback riding, and walking. Designated a National Recreation Trail in 2010.

GOLFING

- Canebrake Club – membership
- Southern Gayles Golf Club – community

FISHING

- Limestone County Alabama offers access to the prime fishing waters of the Elk River, Tennessee River and Wheeler Lake.

HUNTING

- Limestone Hunting Preserve & Sporting Clays offers deer, dove, quail, pheasant and chukar hunts and sporting clays.
- Piney Creek Kennels and Hunting Preserve offers 100+ acres of dove and quail hunting land.
- Swan Creek WMA – 8,870 acres of Alabama Department of Conservation managed area and includes a shooting range
- Tennessee Valley Federal Property – 11,300 acres of regulated hunting land

FESTIVALS

- February
  - Hospice Chili Challenge – last weekend
- March
  - Polk Sallet Follies – second week, Thursday-Saturday
  - Home and Garden Show – second weekend
- April
  - Athens Cruise In (April–September)
  - Saturday Historic Walking Tours – Athens & Mooresville – each Saturday
  - Cars and Bikes on the Square – last Saturday
  - Singing on the Square (April–September) – third Fridays
  - Earth Day Celebration – third Saturday
- May
  - Athens-Limestone Relay for Life
  - Limestone Sheriff's Rodeo
  - Athens Bible School Homespun Arts and Crafts Show
- June
  - Athens Lions Club Kiddie Carnival (last weekend in June to first weekend August)
- July
  - Limestone County Week of Independence (last Saturday of June to first Saturday of July)
  - Firework Show
  - Ardmore Lions Club Tractor and Truck Pull – second weekend
  - CASA Mud Volleyball Tournament – third Saturday
  - Alabama Championship Tractor and Truck Pull – Tanner – last weekend
- August
  - Ardmore Crape Myrtle Festival
  - Ardmore Police Reserve Rodeo
  - Piney Chapel American Farm Heritage Days
- September
  - Athens Grease Festival
- October
  - Tennessee Valley Old Time Fiddlers Convention – first full weekend
  - Wacky Quacky Ducky Derby – first full weekend
  - Athens Storytelling Festival – last weekend
- November
  - Hilltop Arts Festival
  - Athens Christmas Open House
- December
  - Athens Christmas Parade
  - Limestone County Tree Lighting (same night as Athens Parade)
  - Ardmore Christmas Parade
  - Elkmont Lions Club Christmas Parade
  - Sippin' Cider
  - Lincoln Bridgeforth Park Tree Lighting

== Points of interest ==
Museums

- Alabama Veterans Museum and Archives - honoring veterans and their families with displays of memorabilia from the Revolutionary War to the present.
- College Inn/Newby Gulf Station Museum - This landmark was restored to look like a 1940s gas station. It has been featured in Southern Living photo spreads.
- Donnell House - This historic landmark is the former home of Reverend Donnell and a significant site for the "Sack of Athens"
- Houston Memorial Library and Museum - The cornerstone of the Houston Historic District, the building now houses a library and the county museum.
- Limestone County Archives - Contains community and genealogical records for Limestone County.

Other

- Alabama Welcome Center - Just south of the Alabama/Tennessee border, this facility is home to a Saturn 1B rocket as well as war memorials for World War II, Korea and Vietnam.
- Athens State University - A significant site for the "Sack of Athens". Founders Hall is the original structure of the university and is graced with 4 large pillars. Founders Hall also houses the New Testament Chapel containing life-size carvings depicting Christ and other New Testament figures.
- Trinity School - Established by the American Missionary Association to educate the children of freed slaves.
- Limestone County Confederate Soldiers Memorial

== Communities ==
Historic buildings in Elkmont

The largest city entirely in Limestone County is Athens, which had 25,406 people in 2020. The city of Madison is the second largest city in population, and Huntsville is third. The least populous town in Limestone County is Mooresville, with 47 people in 2020.

=== Cities ===
- Athens (county seat)
- Decatur (mostly in Morgan County)
- Huntsville (mostly in Madison County)
- Madison (mostly in Madison County)

=== Towns ===
- Ardmore
- Elkmont
- Lester
- Mooresville

=== Unincorporated communities ===
- Belle Mina
- Burgreen Gin
- Capshaw
- Coxey
- French Mill
- Good Springs
- Greenbrier
- Holland Gin
- Oakland (near Athens)
- Oakland (near Madison)
- Pettusville
- Scarce Grease
- Tanner
- Thach
- Veto

== See also ==
- National Register of Historic Places listings in Limestone County, Alabama
- Properties on the Alabama Register of Landmarks and Heritage in Limestone County, Alabama
