= 1828 United States presidential election in Alabama =

- October 31 – December 2, 1828

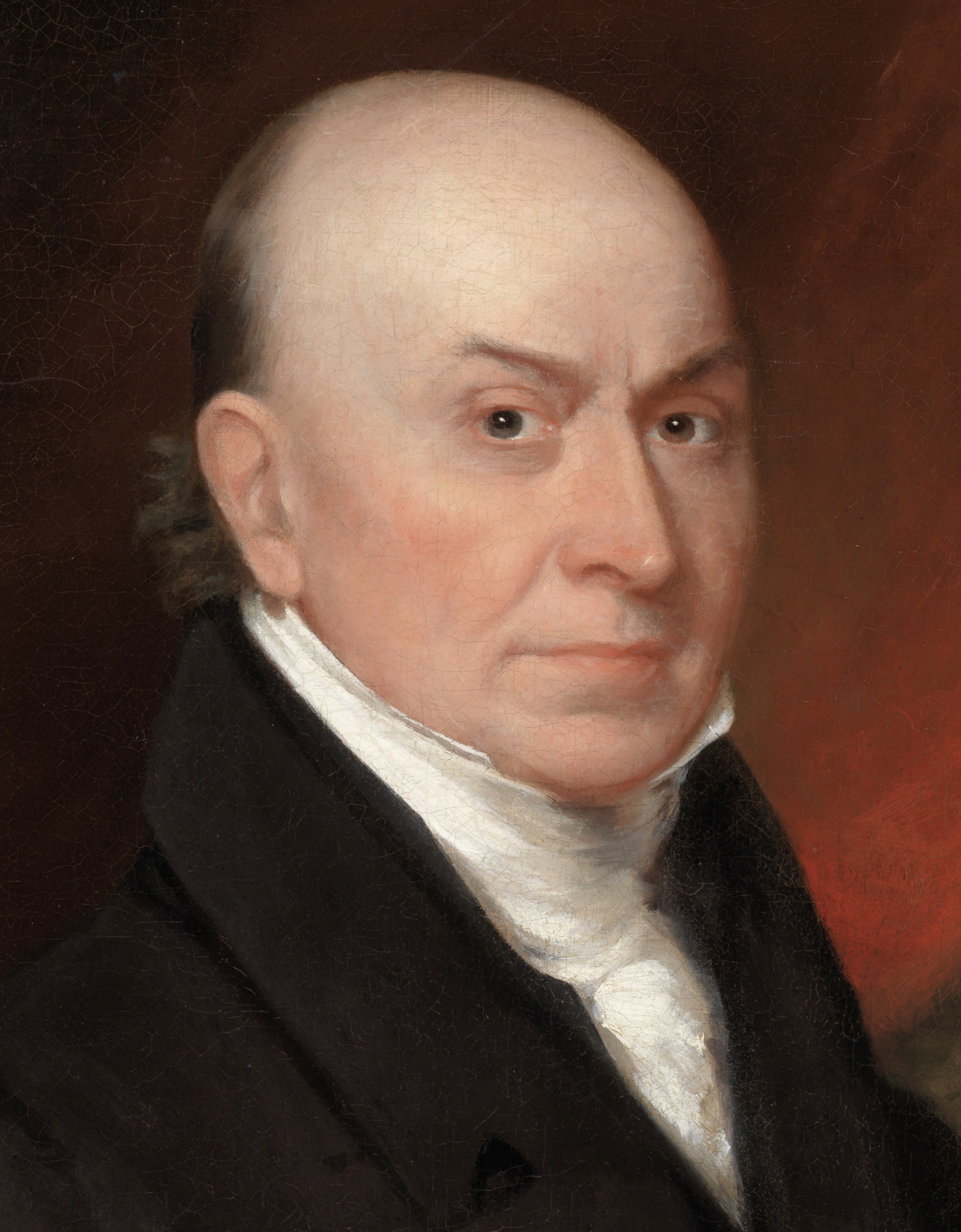
Nominee	Andrew Jackson	John Quincy Adams
Party	Democratic	National Republican
Home state	Tennessee	Massachusetts
Running mate	John C. Calhoun	Richard Rush
Electoral vote	5	0
Popular vote	16,736	1,878
Percentage	89.89%	10.09%
County results
Jackson
60–70%
70–80%
80–90%
90–100%
Unknown/No Vote
President before election
John Quincy Adams
Democratic-Republican
Elected President
Andrew Jackson
Democratic

The 1828 United States presidential election in Alabama took place between October 31 and December 2, 1828, as part of the 1828 United States presidential election. Voters chose five representatives, or electors, to the Electoral College, who voted for President and Vice President.

Alabama voted for the Democratic candidate, Andrew Jackson, over the National Republican candidate, John Quincy Adams. Jackson won Alabama by a margin of 79.80%.

== Results ==
1828 United States presidential election in Alabama
Party	Candidate	Votes	Percentage	Electoral votes
Democratic	Andrew Jackson	16,736	89.89%	5
National Republican	John Quincy Adams (incumbent)	1,878	10.09%	0
N/A	Other	4	0.02%	0
Totals		18,618	100.00%	5

=== Results by county ===
1828 United States Presidential Election in Alabama (by county)
County	Andrew Jackson Democratic		John Quincy Adams National Republican		Total votes cast
County	#	%	#	%	Total votes cast
Autauga	595	93.26%	43	6.74%	638
Baldwin	121	80.67%	29	19.33%	150
Bibb	317	83.42%	63	16.58%	380
Butler	335	87.47%	48	12.53%	383
Clarke	498	93.08%	37	6.92%	535
Covington	86	95.56%	4	4.44%	90
Dallas	744	85.71%	124	14.29%	868
Fayette	276	97.53%	7	2.47%	283
Franklin	644	88.22%	86	11.78%	730
Greene	833	70.77%	344	29.23%	1,177
Henry	266	98.52%	4	1.48%	270
Jackson	1,088	99.45%	6	0.55%	1,094
Jefferson	512	95.70%	23	4.30%	535
Lauderdale	956	89.85%	108	10.15%	1,064
Lawrence	1,078	93.33%	77	6.67%	1,155
Limestone	946	92.84%	73	7.16%	1,019
Madison	1,980	90.66%	204	9.34%	2,184
Marion	367	97.87%	8	2.13%	375
Mobile	396	68.99%	178	31.01%	574
Monroe	676	90.62%	70	9.38%	746
Montgomery	364	90.77%	37	9.23%	401
Morgan	743	98.93%	8	1.07%	751
Perry	636	91.64%	58	8.36%	694
Pickens	408	90.27%	44	9.73%	452
Shelby	591	97.36%	16	2.64%	607
St. Clair	459	98.50%	7	1.50%	466
Tuscaloosa	637	80.53%	154	19.47%	791
Walker	31	100.00%	0	0.00%	31
Washington	185	89.81%	21	10.19%	206
Wilcox	582	85.97%	95	14.03%	677
Totals	17,350	89.78%	1,976 (Note: Stated total for Adams is 1,993.)	10.22%	19,326

== See also ==
- United States presidential elections in Alabama
