= 1824 United States presidential election in Alabama =

- October 26 – December 2, 1824
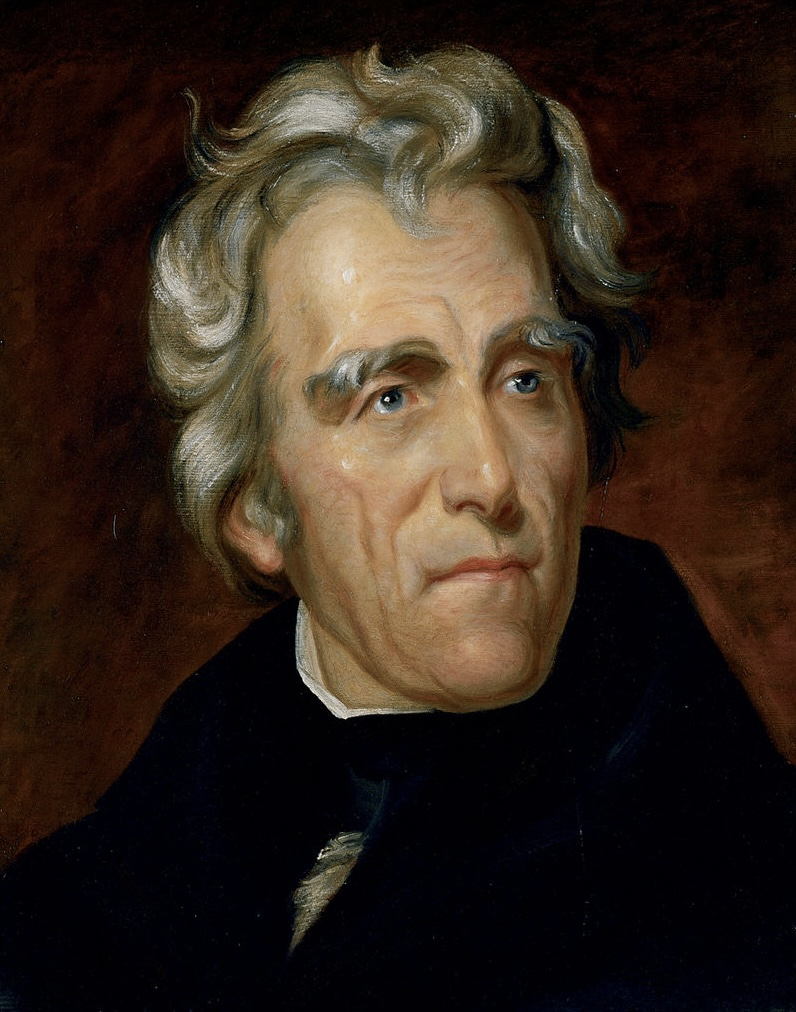

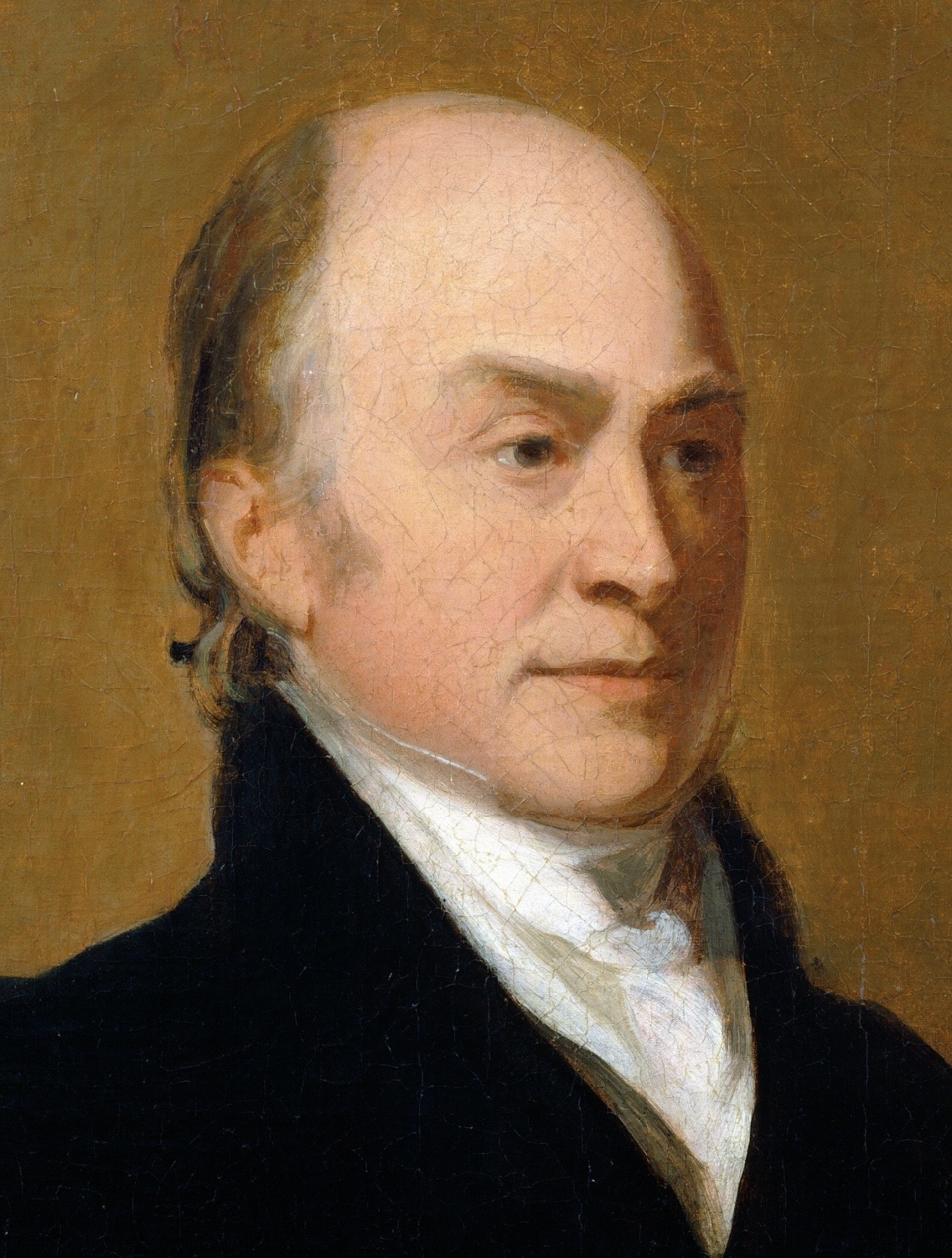

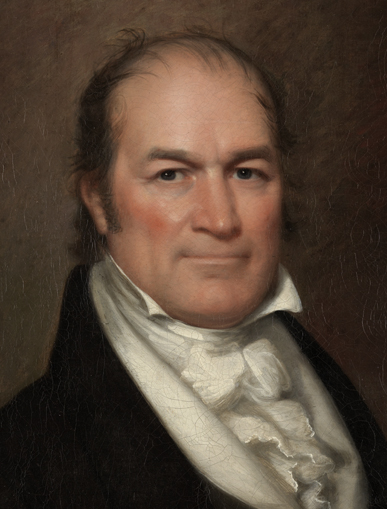
Nominee	Andrew Jackson	John Quincy Adams	William H. Crawford
Party	Democratic-Republican	Democratic-Republican	Democratic-Republican
Home state	Tennessee	Massachusetts	Georgia
Running mate	John C. Calhoun	John C. Calhoun	Nathaniel Macon
Electoral vote	5	0	0
Popular vote	9,429	2,422	1,656
Percentage	69.32%	17.80%	12.17%
County results
Jackson
40–50%
50–60%
70–80%
80–90%
90–100%
Adams
40–50%
Unknown/No Vote
President before election
James Monroe
Democratic-Republican
Elected President
John Quincy Adams
Democratic-Republican

The 1824 United States presidential election in Alabama took place between October 26 and December 2, 1824, as part of the 1824 presidential election. Voters chose five representatives, or electors, to the Electoral College, who voted for President and Vice President.

During this election, the Democratic-Republican Party was the only major national party, and four different candidates from this party sought the Presidency. Alabama voted for Andrew Jackson over John Quincy Adams, William H. Crawford and Henry Clay. Jackson won Alabama by a margin of 51.52%. This was the first time since achieving statehood in 1819 that Alabama backed the losing candidate in a presidential election.

== Results ==
1824 United States presidential election in Alabama
Party	Candidate	Votes	Percentage	Electoral votes
Democratic-Republican	Andrew Jackson	9,429	69.32%	5
Democratic-Republican	John Quincy Adams	2,422	17.80%	0
Democratic-Republican	William H. Crawford	1,656	12.17%	0
Democratic-Republican	Henry Clay	96	0.71%	0
Totals		13,423	100.00%	5

=== Results by county ===
1824 United States Presidential Election in Alabama (by county)
County	Andrew Jackson Democratic-Republican		John Quincy Adams Democratic-Republican		William H. Crawford Democratic-Republican		Henry Clay Democratic-Republican		Total votes cast
County	#	%	#	%	#	%	#	%	Total votes cast
Autauga	274	51.21%	68	12.71%	193	36.07%	0	0.00%	535
Baldwin	87	71.31%	25	20.49%	10	8.20%	0	0.00%	122
Bibb	170	57.82%	53	18.03%	71	24.15%	0	0.00%	294
Blount	167	96.53%	3	1.73%	3	1.73%	0	0.00%	173
Butler	96	39.02%	102	41.46%	48	19.51%	0	0.00%	246
Clarke	253	77.61%	39	11.96%	33	10.12%	1	0.31%	326
Conecuh	200	67.34%	83	27.95%	14	4.71%	0	0.00%	297
Covington	13	76.47%	0	0.00%	4	23.53%	0	0.00%	17
Dallas	411	51.76%	235	29.60%	148	18.64%	0	0.00%	794
Decatur	161	97.58%	0	0.00%	0	0.00%	4	2.42%	165
Franklin	409	86.11%	57	12.00%	6	1.26%	3	0.63%	475
Greene	343	48.17%	283	39.75%	86	12.08%	0	0.00%	712
Henry	138	79.77%	11	6.36%	24	13.87%	0	0.00%	173
Jackson	141	94.00%	6	4.00%	3	2.00%	0	0.00%	150
Jefferson	340	74.56%	92	20.18%	24	5.26%	0	0.00%	456
Lauderdale	530	78.17%	142	20.94%	4	0.59%	2	0.29%	678
Lawrence	616	81.27%	69	9.10%	71	9.37%	2	0.26%	758
Limestone	418	84.79%	20	4.06%	53	10.75%	2	0.41%	493
Madison	1,295	78.58%	194	11.77%	155	9.41%	4	0.24%	1,648
Marengo	150	81.52%	25	13.59%	8	4.35%	1	0.54%	184
Marion	120	85.71%	8	5.71%	12	8.57%	0	0.00%	140
Mobile	205	50.37%	155	38.08%	47	11.55%	0	0.00%	407
Monroe	419	73.00%	120	20.91%	35	6.10%	0	0.00%	574
Montgomery	452	47.58%	163	17.16%	335	35.26%	0	0.00%	950
Morgan	430	91.49%	31	6.60%	8	1.70%	1	0.21%	470
Perry	252	68.11%	58	15.68%	60	16.22%	0	0.00%	370
Pickens	221	78.09%	33	11.66%	29	10.25%	0	0.00%	283
Pike	74	74.00%	14	14.00%	12	12.00%	0	0.00%	100
Shelby	248	83.50%	25	8.42%	24	8.08%	0	0.00%	297
St. Clair	163	87.63%	14	7.53%	9	4.84%	0	0.00%	186
Tuscaloosa	382	55.69%	186	27.11%	114	16.62%	4	0.58%	686
Washington	77	66.38%	23	19.83%	16	13.79%	0	0.00%	116
Wilcox	192	70.85%	79	29.15%	0	0.00%	0	0.00%	271
Totals	9,447	72.13%	2,416	17.84%	1,656	12.23%	27	0.20%	13,546

== See also ==
- United States presidential elections in Alabama
