= Levert, Alabama =

Unincorporated community in Brownsville, Alabama

- Unincorporated community
- Location within Alabama Location within the United States
- Coordinates: 32°45′33″N 87°14′29″W
- Country: United States
- State: Alabama
- County: Perry
- Elevation: 180 ft (55 m)
- Time zone: UTC-6 (Central (CST))
  - Summer (DST): UTC-5 (CDT)
- Area code: 334
- GNIS feature ID: 159927

Levert, also spelled Le Vert, is an unincorporated community in Perry County, Alabama, United States. Levert lies entirely within the Oakmulgee District of the Talladega National Forest. A post office operated under the name Le Vert from 1881 to 1905.
