= Oakland (near Athens), Limestone County, Alabama =

Unincorporated community in Alabama, United States

Oakland
- Unincorporated community
- Oakland's position in Alabama.
- Coordinates: 34°49′39″N 87°05′07″W
- Country: United States
- State: Alabama
- County: Limestone
- Elevation: 738 ft (225 m)
- Time zone: UTC-6 (Central (CST))
  - Summer (DST): UTC-5 (CDT)
- GNIS feature ID: 124148

Oakland is an unincorporated community in Limestone County, Alabama, United States. It is near Athens and located in the west central part of the county.
