= List of state routes in Alabama =

State Route System
- Highway markers for SR 3, SR 17, and SR 157

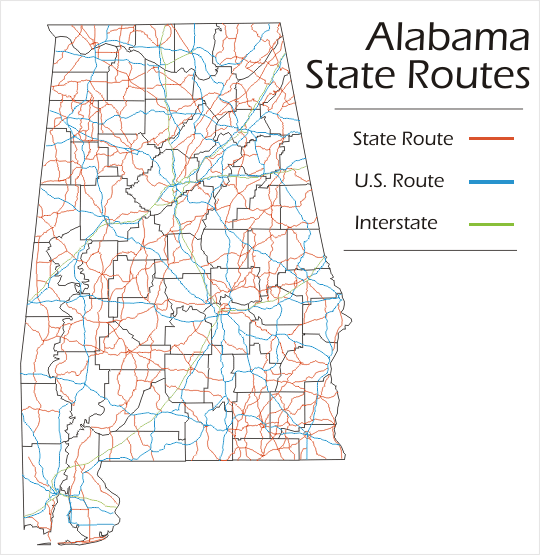
- Map of Alabama State Route System

Highway names
- Interstates: Interstate nn (I-nn)
- US Highways: U.S. Route nn (US nn)
- State: State Route nn (SR nn)

System links
- Alabama State Highway System; Interstate; US; State

The State Route System in Alabama uses the standard numbering convention: odd numbers signify a north–south state route, and even numbers signify an east–west route. Often more than one route number shares the same roadway, so identifying which route the mile markers are for is often difficult.

In no case does a state route number mirror a U.S. Highway number. As such, the following state routes do not exist: 11, 29, 31, 43, 45, 72, 78, 80, 82, 84, 90, 98, 231, 278, 280, 331, 411, or 431.

== State routes list ==
Lengths are from ALDOT Milepost Maps unless otherwise noted

Number	Length (mi)	Length (km)	Southern or western terminus	Northern or eastern terminus	Formed	Removed	Notes
SR 1	352.958	568.031	US 231 at the Florida state line	US 231/US 431 at the Tennessee state line	1928	current	Unsigned, concurrent with US 231 and US 431; the road was rerouted in 1930 via what is now SR 21 and US 280/SR 38 from Oxford to Opelika to match US 241, but the road was moved back to its current route in the 1957 renumbering to match US 431
SR 2	167.211	269.100	US 72 at the Mississippi state line	US 72 at the Tennessee state line	1928	current	Unsigned, concurrent with US 72; swapped with SR 20 west of Florence in the 1957 renumbering
SR 3	374.377	602.501	US 90/US 98 at Spanish Fort	I-65 at Athens	1928	current	Unsigned, concurrent with US 31 south of Athens; prior to the 1957 renumbering, the road continued south from Stapleton via current SR 59
SR 4	192.192	309.303	US 78/I-22 at the Mississippi state line	US 78 at the Georgia state line	1928	current	Mostly unsigned, concurrent with US 78
SR 5	197.775	318.288	US 43 at Thomasville	US 278/SR 13 at Natural Bridge	1928	current	swapped with SR 195 north of Jasper and sections north of Phil Campbell and south of Thomasville replaced by an extended SR 13 in the 1957 renumbering; overlap with SR-13 north of Natural Bridge later eliminated
SR 6	239.895	386.074	US 82 at the Mississippi state line	US 82 at the Georgia state line	1928	current	Unsigned, concurrent with US 82
SR 7	250.671	403.416	US 11/US 80 at the Mississippi state line	US 11 at the Georgia state line	1928	current	Unsigned, concurrent with US 11
SR 8	217.887	350.655	I-20/I-59 exit 1 near Cuba	US 80 at the Georgia state line	1928	current	Unsigned, concurrent with US 80 east of I-20/I-59
SR 9	273.069	439.462	US 331 at the Florida state line	SR 20 at the Georgia state line	1928	current	Partly unsigned, concurrent with US 80, US 82 within Montgomery, US 231 from Montgomery to Wetumpka and US 331 from Montgomery southward; before the 1957 renumbering, the road went southwest from Brantley via what is now US 29/SR 15 and ended at Andalusia
SR 10	230.721	371.309	MS 19 at the Mississippi state line	SR 37 at the Georgia state line	1928	current	
SR 11	—	—	Wetumpka	Piedmont	1928	1957	Section from Lowndesboro to the Florida state line replaced by SR 209 and parts of SR 28 and SR 43 (this section became SR 41 in the 1957 renumbering) in 1955/1956; rest renumbered as part of SR 21 because of US 11
SR 12	231.682	372.856	US 84 at the Mississippi state line	US 84 at the Georgia state line	1928	current	Unsigned, concurrent with US 84; prior to the 1957 renumbering, the road went via current SR 52 from Dothan to Opp and went southwest from Andalusia via what is now US 29/SR 15, US 31/SR 3, and US 90/SR 16
SR 13	335.995	540.732	US 90 at Mobile	US 43 at the Tennessee state line	1928	current	Mostly unsigned, concurrent with US 43 south of Fayette and north of Russellville; prior to the 1957 renumbering, the road followed what is now SR-69 between Tuscaloosa and Linden, and ran from Phil Campbell to Thomasville; rerouted on current alignment rather than US 43 alignment between Phil Campbell and Bankston around the same time
SR 14	218.289	351.302	MS 69 at the Mississippi state line	SR 147 at Auburn	1928	current	Prior to the 1957 renumbering, the west end was at Selma
SR 15	226.550	364.597	US 31 at Brewton	US 29 at the Georgia state line	1928	current	Unsigned, concurrent with US 29 from Brewton northward; prior to the 1957 renumbering, it is now SR 87, US 84/SR 12, and US 331/SR 9 south of Troy
SR 16	77.031	123.969	US 90 at the Mississippi state line	US 90 at the Florida state line	1928	current	Unsigned, concurrent with US 90; prior to the 1957 renumbering, the west end was at Mobile
SR 17	346.562	557.737	US 98 at Mobile	SR 13 at the Tennessee state line	1928	current	Partly unsigned, concurrent with US 45 south of Deer Park; prior to the 1957 renumbering, followed what is now SR 157 north of Florence
SR 18	61.591	99.121	MS 12 at the Mississippi state line	SR 69 south of Oakman	1928	current	
SR 19	—	—	Hamilton	Millport	1928	1952	Replaced by relocated SR 17
SR 19	37.6	60.5	SR 17 north of Detroit	MS 23 at Mississippi state line in Red Bay	1954	current	Prior to the 1957 renumbering, the north end was at Vina
SR 20	73.978	119.056	SR 69 at the Tennessee state line	I-65	1928	current	Swapped with SR 2 west of Florence in the 1957 renumbering
SR 21	—	—	Leeds	Vincent	1928	1957	Replaced by relocated SR 25; continued southeast to Opelika until 1931
SR 21	279.296	449.483	SR 97 at the Florida state line	US 278 at Piedmont	1957	current	
SR 22	168.543	271.244	SR 5 at Safford	SR 34 at the Georgia state line	1928	current	Prior to the 1957 renumbering, the east end was at Alexander City
SR 23	12.611	20.295	US 11 east of Springville	US 231 at Ashville	1928	current	Prior to the 1957 renumbering, continued northeast to Centre
SR 24	69.606	112.020	MS 76 at the Mississippi state line	US 31 at Decatur	1928	current	
SR 25	257.352	414.168	SR 5 west of Pine Hill	US 411 at the Georgia state line	1928	current	Partly unsigned, concurrent with US 411 north of Leeds; prior to the 1957 renumbering, the south end was at Centreville and the road continued north from Vincent to Cleveland via what is now US 231/SR 53
SR 26	14.560	23.432	SR 51 at Hurtsboro	US 431 at Seale	1928	current	Until 1985, continued west to US 82 at Union Springs
SR 27	77.122	124.116	Holmes CR 185 at the Florida state line	SR 10 at Abbeville	1928	current	
SR 28	97.287	156.568	SR 17 north of Boyd	SR 21 north of Oak Hill	1928	current	Prior to the 1957 renumbering, the south end was at Linden
SR 29	—	—	York	Deer Park	1928	1952	Replaced by an extended SR 17; number not reused because of US 29
SR 30	19.012	30.597	SR 51 at Clayton	US 431 at Eufaula	1928	current	Prior to the 1957 renumbering, continued southwest to Clintonville
SR 31	—	—	Double Springs	Guntersville	1928	1946	Possibly extended west to Hamilton in 1943-1945; renumbered SR 112 because the road intersected US 31
SR 32	—	—	Tarrant City	Scottsboro	1928	1957	Replaced by new SR 79 north of Guntersville and new SR 75 south of Albertville because the route was north-south
SR 32	3.594	5.784	MS 14 at the Mississippi state line	SR 17 south of Cochrane	1957	current	
SR 33	—	—	Wren	Laceys Spring	1928	1957	Renumbered SR 36 because the route was east-west
SR 33	50.609	81.447	US 278/SR 195 at Double Springs	US 72 Alt at Courtland	1957	current	
SR 34	—	—	Tennessee state line	Florence	1928	1957	Replaced by relocated SR 17
SR 34	12.965	20.865	US 231 at Pell City	SR 77 north of Talladega	1957	current	
SR 35	68.291	109.904	SR 9 near Centre	US 72 at Woodville	1928	current	
SR 36	—	—	Double Springs	Courtland	1928	1957	Renumbered SR 33 because the route was north-south
SR 36	44.473	71.572	SR 33 at Wren	US 231 at Laceys Spring	1957	current	
SR 37	—	—	Centre	Georgia state line	1928	1931	Renumbered SR 62; route number reused on pre-1928 route
SR 37	—	—	Hurtsboro	Opelika	1931	1985	Replaced by an extended SR 51; prior to the 1957 renumbering, continued north to Oxford
SR 37	—	—	Perdue Hill	Little River	1989	1995	
SR 37	0.768	1.236	US 84 west of Daleville	Fort Novosel	1998	current	
SR 38	—	—	Birmingham	Tennessee state line	1928	1957	Replaced by new SR 79 south of Cleveland and extended SR 53 north of Cleveland because the route was north-south
SR 38	138.025	222.130	US 31 at Homewood	US 280 at the Georgia state line	1957	current	Unsigned, concurrent with US 280 from Homewood eastward
SR 39	23.057	37.107	US 11 south of Epes	SR 14 at Clinton	1928	current	
SR 40	—	—	Mississippi state line	Providence	1928	1957	Replaced by extended SR 14 west of Eutaw and rerouted SR 13 south of Eutaw
SR 40	21.184	34.092	SR 35 east of Scottsboro	US 11 at Hammondville	1958	current	
SR 41	—	—	Eutaw	Marion	1928	1957	Replaced by an extended SR 14
SR 41	127.484	205.166	SR 87 at the Florida state line	SR 14 at Selma	1957	current	
SR 42	80.248	129.147	US 98 at the Mississippi state line	US 98 at the Florida state line	1928	current	Unsigned, concurrent with US 98; prior to the 1957 renumbering, the east end was at Mobile
SR 43	—	—	Sprott	Monroeville	1928	1957	Section west of Selma replaced by an extended SR 14 and rest was renumbered as part of SR 41 because of US 43
SR 44	—	—	Coffeeville	Evergreen	1928	1957	Replaced by relocated SR 12
SR 44	10.015	16.118	US 43 at Guin	SR 129 at Brilliant	1959	current	
SR 45	—	—	Montgomery	Mountain Creek	1928	1957	Renumbered SR 143 in the 1957 renumbering because of US 45
SR 46	21.074	33.915	US 78 at Heflin	SR 166 at the Georgia state line	1928	current	
SR 47	43.063	69.303	US 84 at Mexia	SR 10 at Awin	1928	current	
SR 48	34.321	55.234	SR 9 at Lineville	SR 5 at the Georgia state line	1928	current	Prior to the 1957 renumbering, the road continued northwest to Pell City via what is now SR 77 and SR 34
SR 49	82.684	133.067	I-85 exit 32 south of Franklin	SR 281 in Talladega National Forest	1928	current	
SR 50	54.261	87.325	SR 229 near Martin Dam	US 29 at Lanett	1928	current	
SR 51	114.183	183.760	US 84 north of Enterprise	I-85 exit 60 at Opelika	1928	current	Prior to 1985, the north end was at Midway; prior to the 1957 renumbering, the south end was at Clayton
SR 52	82.805	133.262	US 331 at Opp	SR 62 at the Georgia state line	1928	current	Prior to the 1957 renumbering, the road went west from Dothan via what is now US 84/SR 12 and SR 189 to Brantley
SR 53	345.287	555.686	SR 71 at the Florida state line	I-65 west of Ardmore	1928	current	Mostly unsigned, concurrent with US 231 from Dothan to Huntsville; prior to the 1957 renumbering, the north end was at Montgomery and the road followed what is now US 29/SR 15 and SR 93 from Brundidge to Banks
SR 54	15.995	25.741	US 331 at Florala	SR 52 west of Samson	1928	current	
SR 55	49.431	79.551	SR 85 at the Florida state line	US 31 at McKenzie	1928	current	
SR 56	27.696	44.572	MS 42 at the Mississippi state line	US 43 at Wagerville	1928	current	Swapped with SR 29 (now SR 17) south of Chatom in 1946; extended west from Chatom in 1949/1950
SR 57	16.127	25.954	US 45 at the Mississippi state line	SR 17 near Deer Park	1928	current	Unsigned, concurrent with US 45 north of Deer Park
SR 58	—	—	Georgia state line	Tennessee state line	1928	1957	Renumbered SR 117 because the route was north-south
SR 58	1.648	2.652	Former US 82/SR 25/SR 219 at Centreville	Former US 82 at Centreville	1959	2015	Formerly part of US 82/SR 6; mileage transferred to new SR 382 on old US 82 alignment
SR 59	93.670	150.747	SR 182 at Gulf Shores	SR 21 at Uriah	1928	current	Prior to the 1957 renumbering, the south end was at Bay Minette
SR 60	11.310	18.202	SR 14 at Wedgeworth	SR 69 south of Moundville	1928	current	
SR 61	18.311	29.469	US 80 at Uniontown	SR 14 at Greensboro	1928	current	
SR 62	—	—	Wilsonville	Winterboro	1928	1934	Renumbered SR 76 to avoid conflict with the other SR 62
SR 62	—	—	Centre	Georgia state line	1931	1957	Replaced by relocated SR 25
SR 62	—	—	Ohatchee	Alexandria	1964	1993	Replaced by an extended SR 144
SR 62	2.443	3.932	Former Monsanto plant entrance	SR 227 north of Guntersville	1995	current	
SR 63	—	—	Columbiana	Sylacauga	1928	1929	Included a ferry that has now been discontinued; now Shelby CR 30 and Talladega CR 31 and CR 2
SR 63	45.851	73.790	SR 14 at Claud	SR 9 at Cleveland Crossroads	1930	current	Prior to the 1957 renumbering, the road went northeast from Alexander City via what is now SR 22
SR 64	18.230	29.338	US 43 north of Killen	SR 207 north of Anderson	1934	current	
SR 65	27.540	44.321	US 72 north of Paint Rock	SR 97 at the Tennessee state line	1934	current	
SR 66	—	—	Florida state line	Ozark	1934	1957	Renumbered SR 123 because the route was north-south
SR 66	9.291	14.952	SR 28 at Consul	SR 5 south of Safford	1961	current	
SR 67	47.107	75.811	US 231 south of Summit	US 72 Alt/SR 20 at Decatur	1934	current	
SR 68	52.926	85.176	SR 75 near Albertville	SR 114 at the Georgia state line	1934	current	Prior to the 1957 renumbering, the east end was at Leesburg
SR 69	280.599	451.580	SR 177 at Jackson	US 431 at Guntersville	1934	current	Prior to the 1957 renumbering, the north end was at Cullman and the south end was at Tuscaloosa
SR 70	—	—	Mississippi state line	Carrollton	1934	1954	Redesignated as Pickens CR 70; section east of SR 14 restored as SR 86 in 1961; remainder restored as an extension of SR 86 in 1981/1982
SR 70	8.290	13.341	US 31 north of Calera	SR 25 at Columbiana	1961	current	
SR 71	—	—	MS 14 at the Mississippi state line	SR 17 south of Cochrane	1934	1957	Renumbered SR 32 because the route was east-west
SR 71	32.024	51.538	SR 35 at Section	SR 136 at the Georgia state line	1957	current	
SR 73	—	—	Piedmont	Forney	1934	1947	Now Old Ladiga Road, Howell Road, and Cherokee CR 29
SR 73	11.219	18.055	SR 71 at Higdon	SR 377 at the Tennessee state line	1956	current	
SR 74	170.856	274.966	I-22/US 78 exit 7	US 278 at the Georgia state line	1934	current	Mostly unsigned, concurrent with US 278 east of Hamilton
SR 75	—	—	Cedar Bluff	Georgia state line	1934	1957	Replaced by an extended SR 68 because the route was east-west
SR 75	113.220	182.210	US 11 at Birmingham	SR 301 at the Georgia state line	1957	current	
SR 76	16.641	26.781	SR 25 near Wilsonville	Winterboro	1934	current	
SR 77	112.334	180.784	US 431 at LaFayette	US 431 north of Attalla	1934	current	Prior to the 1957 renumbering, the north end was at Ashland
SR 79	—	—	Linden	Coffeeville	1934	1957	Replaced by an extended SR 69
SR 79	117.605	189.267	I-20/I-59 at Birmingham	SR 16 at the Tennessee state line	1957	current	
SR 81	10.432	16.789	US 80 at Tuskegee	SR 14 at Notasulga	1934	current	
SR 83	24.274	39.065	US 31/US 84 at Evergreen	SR 47 at Midway	1934	current	
SR 85	22.316	35.914	SR 27 at Geneva	Fort Novosel	1934	current	
SR 86	—	—	Curtis	south of Brantley	1934	1957	Renumbered SR 141 because the route was north-south
SR 86	27.396	44.090	MS 388 at the Mississippi state line	US 82 at Gordo	1961	current	
SR 87	61.552	99.058	SR 81 at the Florida state line	US 231 at Troy	1934	current	Prior to the 1957 renumbering, the north end was at Elba
SR 88	—	—	Florida state line	south of Andalusia	1934	1957	Renumbered SR 137 because the route was north-south
SR 88	3.310	5.327	US 84 at Enterprise	US 84 at Enterprise	1962	current	
SR 89	—	—	Spanish Fort	Florida state line	1934	1957	Replaced by an extended SR 42
SR 89	11.815	19.014	SR 21 south of Ackerville	SR 41 at Elm Bluff	1957	current	
SR 91	—	—	Birmingham	Sylacauga	1934	1957	Renumbered SR 38 (which extended east over part of old SR 1) because the route was east-west
SR 91	38.161	61.414	SR 69 at Wilburn	US 278 at Holly Pond	1958	current	
SR 92	—	—	Greensboro	Brent	1934	1957	Replaced by an extended SR 25
SR 92	11.019	17.733	SR 167 south of Enterprise	US 84 north of Wicksburg	1962	current	
SR 93	—	—	Florida state line	Repton	1934	1957	Replaced by new SR 41; continued west to Frisco City via what is now SR 136 and Monroe CR 23 until 1954/1955
SR 93	8.398	13.515	US 231 at Brundidge	US 29 at Banks	1957	current	
SR 94	19.143	30.808	US 331 at Ada	US 231 north of Orion	1934	current	
SR 95	40.370	64.969	SR 52 at Columbia	US 431 south of Eufaula	1934	current	
SR 96	—	—	Kimbrough	Millers Ferry	1934	1947	Replaced by relocated SR 10; this section was replaced by SR 162 in 1972
SR 96	30.680	49.375	MS 50 at the Mississippi state line	US 43 at Fayette	1952	current	
SR 97	29.798	47.955	US 331 near Lapine	US 80 at Lowndesboro	1940	current	
SR 98	—	—	Opp	Brantley	1940	1957	Replaced by relocated SR 9 because of US 98
SR 99	—	—	west of Pine Hill	Greensboro	1940	1957	Replaced by an extended SR 25
SR 99	21.914	35.267	US 31 at Athens	SR 207 near Anderson	1958	current	
SR 100	—	—	south of Ackerville	Elm Bluff	1940	1957	Renumbered SR 89 because the route was north-south; prior to 1956, the route continued south to Riley
SR 100	1.670	2.688	US 29 at Andalusia	US 84 at Andalusia	1962	current	
SR 101	39.107	62.937	Lawrence CR 460	SR 227 at the Tennessee state line	1940	current	
SR 102	—	—	Talladega	Lincoln	1940	1957	Replaced by an extended SR 77 because the route was north-south
SR 102	24.281	39.076	US 43 north of Fayette	SR 124 at Townley	1962	current	
SR 103	17.463	28.104	SR 171 at the Florida state line	SR 123 at Wicksburg	1940	current	
SR 104	10.769	17.331	US 98 at Fairhope	SR 59 at Robertsdale	1941	current	
SR 105	18.905	30.425	SR 27 at Ozark	SR 10 north of Clopton	1946	current	
SR 106	40.819	65.692	Conecuh CR 106 west of Georgiana	US 29 west of Brantley	1941	current	
SR 107	—	—	SR 11 (now SR 21) at Anniston	US 241 (now Noble Street) at Anniston	1946	1957	Renumbered SR 108 because the route was east-west; now Pelham Road
SR 107	19.105	30.747	SR 18 west of Fayette	US 278 at Guin	1957	current	
SR 108	—	—	Bessemer	Birmingham	1946	1950	Now Dartmouth Avenue, Avenue K, and Jefferson Avenue
SR 108	—	—	SR 21 at Anniston	US 431 (now Noble Street) at Anniston	1957	1962	Now Pelham Road
SR 108	—	—	US 31/US 82 at Montgomery	US 231/US 80 at Montgomery	1983	1991	Now Birmingham Highway, Bell Street, Maxwell Boulevard, Clay/Herron Street, Bibb Street, and Madison Avenue
SR 108	1	1.6	SR 110	I-85	1999	current	Future Interstate 85
SR 109	9.907	15.944	SR 77 at the Florida state line	US 231 south of Dothan	1946	current	
SR 110	—	—	Georgia state line	Albertville	1946	1957	Replaced by new SR 75 because the route was north-south
SR 110	32.257	51.913	I-85 and US 80 near Montgomery	US 82 west of Union Springs	1962	current	
SR 111	17.007	27.370	US 231 at Wetumpka	SR 143 west of Coosa River	1948	current	
SR 112	—	—	Cullman	Guntersville	1946	1957	Replaced by an extended SR 69; continued west to Hamilton until 1949/1950
SR 112	30.2	48.6	US 31 at Bay Minette	Escambia CR 184 at the Florida state line	1962	2004	Decommissioned when SR 181 extended south of US 90; now Baldwin CR 112
SR 113	15.457	24.876	US 29 at the Florida state line	I-65 exit 69 south of Barnett Crossroads	1948	current	
SR 114	—	—	Garland	US 31 at McKenzie	1948	1954	Now Butler CR 8
SR 114	14.251	22.935	SR 10 at Lavaca	SR 69 east of Myrtlewood	1963	current	
SR 115	3.250	5.230	SR 9	US 280 at Kellyton	1948	current	
SR 116	—	—	Tuscaloosa	US 11 at Bucksville	1948	1954	Redesignated as Tuscaloosa CR 116, now SR 216
SR 116	9.482	15.260	SR 17 between Emelle and Geiger	SR 39 at Gainesville	1963	current	
SR 117	—	—	SR 27 east of Coffee Springs	SR 27 north of Coffee Springs	1948	1954	Now Leslie Road, Coffee Springs-Geneva Road, Geneva CR 75, and Geneva CR 665
SR 117	50.156	80.718	SR 48 at the Georgia state line	SR 56 at the Tennessee state line	1957	current	
SR 118	57.461	92.475	US-278 at the Mississippi state line	SR 5 at Jasper	1948	current	Partially unsigned, concurrent with US 278 west of Guin
SR 119	39.625	63.770	SR 25 at Montevallo	US 78 at Leeds	1948	current	
SR 120	4.160	6.695	SR 49 at Reeltown	SR 14 at Liberty City	1948	current	
SR 121	0.9	1.4	US 280 at Camp Hill	SR 50 at Camp Hill	1948	2005	Decommissioned when US 280 bypass opened
SR 122	3.777	6.078	US 84 at New Brockton	SR 51 at Clintonville	1948	current	Swapped with SR 51 (which replaced that section of SR 30 at the same time) in the 1957 renumbering
SR 123	—	—	SR 30 (now SR 51) southwest of Ariton	US 231 west of Ariton	1948	1955	Now Dale CR 52
SR 123	45.750	73.627	SR 167 south of Hartford	US 231 west of Ariton	1957	current	Continued south to the Florida state line prior to 1963-1964
SR 124	—	—	Evergreen	River Falls	1948	1957	Replaced by relocated SR 12
SR 124	10.896	17.535	US 78 north of Townley	SR 69 at Jasper	1963	current	
SR 125	—	—	SR 124 (now SR 12) southwest of Red Level	SR 55 in Red Level	1948	1954	Now Covington CR 7
SR 125	25.646	41.273	US 84 at Elba	US 231 south of Brundidge	1958	current	
SR 126	—	—	US 80 at Tuskegee	SR 81 at Tuskegee	1948	1991	Now Montgomery Road
SR 126	11.054	17.790	I-85/US 80 east of Montgomery	SR 110 east of Montgomery	1997	current	
SR 127	13.510	21.742	SR 99 at Athens	SR 166 at the Tennessee state line	1948	current	
SR 128	—	—	Cullman	SR 81 at Holly Pond	1948	1950	Replaced by an extended SR 74
SR 128	—	—	Garden City	Blountsville	1950	1955	Now Blount CR 26
SR 128	1.518	2.443	SR 63 south of Alexander City	Lake Martin	1963	current	
SR 129	41.191	66.290	US 43 north of Fayette	SR 13 at Haleyville	1948	current	
SR 130	15.507	24.956	US 29 near Banks	SR 51 at Louisville	1948	current	
SR 131	27.124	43.652	SR 10 east of Clio	US 431 at Eufaula	1948	current	
SR 132	—	—	Boyds	Moscow	1948	1957	Replaced by an extended SR 28
SR 132	17.438	28.064	SR 75 at Oneonta	US 278 east of Walnut Grove	1963	current	
SR 133	16.976	27.320	US 72 Alt east of Tuscumbia	SR 20 west of Florence	1948	current	
SR 134	76.795	123.590	US 331 at Opp	SR 95 at Columbia	1948	current	Prior to the 1957 renumbering, the east end was at Newton
SR 135	—	—	US 80 at Demopolis	US 43 at Demopolis	1948	1952	Now Maria Avenue and Jackson Street
SR 135	2.138	3.441	SR 182 at Gulf Shores	SR 180 at Gulf Shores	1957	current	
SR 136	—	—	Midland City	CR 49 east of Headland	1948	1957	Replaced by an extended SR 134
SR 136	6.151	9.899	SR 21/SR 41 south of Monroeville	US 84 east of Excel	1964	current	
SR 137	—	—	SR 17 in Silas	SR 17 in Silas	1948	1954	Now First Street
SR 137	13.997	22.526	SR 189 at the Florida state line	US 29 south of Andalusia	1957	current	
SR 138	—	—	SR 182 at Gulf Shores	SR 180 at Gulf Shores	1948	1957	Renumbered SR 135 because the route was north-south
SR 138	—	—	SR 225 at Crossroads	US 31/SR 3/SR 59 at Bay Minette	1964	1987	Now Baldwin CR 138
SR 138	—	—	Mississippi border	SR 44	1989	1993	Replaced by relocated US 78/SR 4
SR 138	0.785	1.263	I-85 at Shorter	US 80 at Shorter	1997	current	
SR 139	—	—	US 231 at Dothan	US 84 at Dothan	1948	1958	Now Westgate Parkway
SR 139	19.856	31.955	SR 22 at Maplesville	SR 25 south of Wilton	1963	current	
SR 140	—	—	US 43 west of Fulton	Fulton	1948	1954	Redesignated as Clarke CR 17; now SR 178
SR 140	—	—	US 82 east of Gordo	US 82 at Coker	1964	1977	Now Pickens and Tuscaloosa CR 140
SR 140	12.480	20.085	SR 41 at Selma	SR 14 east of Burnsville	1985	current	
SR 141	—	—	SR 22 east of Verbena	Mitchell Dam	1948	1954	Now Chilton CR 93
SR 141	14.430	23.223	SR 189 at Basin	US 331 south of Brantley	1957	current	
SR 142	—	—	Akron	SR 60 east of Akron	1948	1954	Now Hale CR 36
SR 142	1.802	2.900	US 278 west of Guin	US 43/US 278 at Guin	1964	current	
SR 143	—	—	SR 14 east of Elmore	SR 45 (now SR 143) north of Elmore	1948	1954	Now Fitzpatrick Road
SR 143	28.598	46.024	I-65 exit 176 north of Montgomery	US 31 at Mountain Creek	1957	current	
SR 144	—	—	Moundville Archaeological Site	SR 13 (now SR 69) north of Moundville	1948	1954	Now Mound Parkway
SR 144	26.663	42.910	US 231 north of Pell City	US 431 near Alexandria	1965	current	
SR 145	26.996	43.446	US 31 at Clanton	Shelby CR 61 near Wilsonville	1948	current	
SR 146	—	—	US 78 at Irondale	US 11 at Birmingham	1948	1949	Now Oporto Madrid Boulevard
SR 146	6.334	10.194	SR 65 at Swaim	SR 79 north of Skyline	1965	current	
SR 147	13	21	I-85 south of Auburn	US 431 south of Lafayette	1948	current	
SR 148	—	—	US 43 at Thomasville	Clarke CR 27 in Thomasville	1948	1954	Now Alabama Avenue
SR 148	20.025	32.227	SR 21 at Sylacauga	SR 9 at Millersville	1967	current	
SR 149	4.145	6.671	US 280 at Mountain Brook	Lakeshore Parkway in Homewood	1948	current	
SR 150	11.833	19.043	US 11 at Bessemer	US 31 at Hoover	1948	current	
SR 151	—	—	SR 21 east of Hartford	SR 66 (now SR 123) northeast of Hartford	1948	1955	Now Geneva CR 69
SR 151	0.404	0.650	SR 79	SR 75 at Pinson	1957	current	
SR 152	—	—	US 80 at Selma	US 80 southeast of Selma	1948	1954	Now Old Montgomery Highway
SR 152	6.605	10.630	I-65 exit 173 at Montgomery	US 231/SR 21 at Montgomery	1967	current	
SR 153	—	—	US 31 east of Chapman	US 31 northeast of Chapman	1948	1954	Now Daffodil Road
SR 153	8.994	14.474	SR 83 at the Florida state line	SR 52 west of Samson	1959	current	
SR 154	—	—	US 82 at Gordo	US 82 at Gordo	1948	1954	Now 4th Avenue and Main Street
SR 154	29.480	47.443	SR 69 north of Coffeeville	US 43 at Thomasville	1967	current	
SR 155	10.890	17.526	US 31 north of Jemison	SR 119 at Montevallo	1948	current	
SR 156	—	—	SR 22 at Selma	SR 22 at Selma	1948	1954	Now Crescent Hill Drive, Cahaba Road, and J.L. Chestnut Jr Boulevard
SR 156	7.186	11.565	SR 17 at Jachin	SR 114 at Pennington	1967	current	
SR 157	—	—	US 43 (this section now SR 295) in Grove Hill	US 43 in Pine Hill	1948	1953	Now CR 27 / Old Highway 5
SR 157	91.061	146.548	US 278 east of Cullman	SR 227 at the Tennessee state line	1957	current	
SR 158	—	—	US 241 (this section now SR 95) at Abbeville	CR 57 northeast of Abbeville	1948	1949	Now Henry CR 46
SR 158	—	—	US 231 at Willow Springs	SR 14 at Tallassee	1952	1953	Now Elmore CR 8
SR 158	21.44	34.50	US 98 at Wilmer	US 43 at Saraland	1972	current	
SR 159	—	—	US 43 southwest of Willow Springs	US 43 at Leroy	1948	1954	Now TB Pearson Road and Washington CR 34
SR 159	29.626	47.678	US 82 at Gordo	SR 171 at Fayette	1959	current	
SR 160	—	—	SR 3 (now SR 59) at Gulf Shores	Orange Beach (Bear Point)	1948	1957	Replaced by an extended SR 180
SR 160	18.415	29.636	US 31 north of Warrior	US 231 at Cleveland	1972	current	
SR 161	30.472	49.040	SR 182 at Orange Beach	I-10	1948	current	Extended from SR 180 at Orange Beach to I-10 via SR 180 and the Foley Beach Express in 2025
SR 162	—	—	SR 17) west of Bellamy	Bellamy	1948	1954	Replaced by relocated US 80/SR 8
SR 162	14.080	22.660	SR 5 at Kimbrough	SR 28 north of Millers Ferry	1972	current	
SR 163	11.104	17.870	SR 193 west of Hollingers Island	US 90 at Mobile	1948	current	
SR 164	2.548	4.101	SR 10 west of Camden	SR 28 at Camden	1948	current	
SR 165	32.384	52.117	US 431 south of Phenix City	US 431 north of Eufaula	1948	current	
SR 166	—	—	Section	Georgia state line	1948	1957	Renumbered SR 71 because the route was north-south
SR 166	4.726	7.606	SR 141 north of Curtis	US 84 at Elba	1972	current	
SR 167	—	—	SR 18 west of Fayette	US 278 at Guin	1948	1957	Renumbered SR 107 because of the route length
SR 167	52.445	84.402	SR 79 at the Florida state line	SR 87 south of Spring Hill	1959	current	
SR 168	17.392	27.990	SR 75 at Douglas	SR 68 at Kilpatrick	1948	current	
SR 169	26.325	42.366	SR 51 at Opelika	US 431 north of Seale	1948	current	
SR 170	—	—	Bolling	US 31 east of Bolling	1948	1954	Now Butler CR 28
SR 170	11.720	18.862	US 231 at Wetumpka	SR 63 north of Eclectic	1973	current	
SR 171	73.355	118.053	US 43 north of Northport	US 43/US 278/SR 17 at Hamilton	1948	current	
SR 172	24.420	39.300	SR 19 east of Vina	SR 13 at Bear Creek	1948	current	Prior to the 1957 renumbering, the west end was at Red Bay
SR 173	14.462	23.274	US 431 at Headland	SR 27 south of Abbeville	1948	current	
SR 174	19.607	31.554	US 11 at Springville	US 231 at Pell City	1949	current	
SR 175	—	—	US 78 west of Pell City	SR 174 northwest of Pell City	1949	1954	Now St. Clair CR 29
SR 175	5.382	8.661	SR 14/SR 183 west of Sprott	SR 5 south Heiberger	1962	current	
SR 176	—	—	SR 74 (now also US 278) northwest of Altoona	Altoona	1951	1954	Now Blount and Etowah CR 41
SR 176	25.618	41.228	SR 68 east of Collinsville	SR 35 north of Blanche	1973	current	
SR 177	—	—	Leeds	south of Ashville	1949	1957	Replaced by relocated SR 25
SR 177	5.160	8.304	US 43 at Jackson	US 43 at Jackson	1957	current	
SR 178	—	—	US 280 northwest of Alexander City	US 280 southeast of Alexander City	1951	1955	Now Washington Street, Central Avenue, and Cherokee Road
SR 178	1.956	3.148	US 43 west of Fulton	Main Street at Fulton	1975	current	
SR 179	10.434	16.792	US 278 at Howelton	SR 168 west of Boaz	1951	current	
SR 180	25.481	41.008	Fort Morgan	SR 161 west of Orange Beach (Bear Point)	1951	current	Prior to the 1957 renumbering, the east end was at Gulf Shores; continued to Orange Beach until 2025
SR 181	18.235	29.346	US 98 south of Fairhope	US 31 east of Spanish Fort	1951	current	
SR 182	17.046	27.433	Pine Beach	SR 292 at the Florida state line	1951	current	
SR 183	47.443	76.352	US 80 at Uniontown	US 82 west of Maplesville	1951	current	
SR 184	14.891	23.965	South Montgomery Avenue in Sheffield	SR 101 north of Town Creek	1951	current	
SR 185	23.129	37.223	US 31 south of Greenville	US 31 at Logan	1951	current	
SR 186	3.829	6.162	I-85 exit 42 east of Tuskegee	US 29/US 80 east of Tuskegee	1973	current	
SR 187	22.995	37.007	US 43 north of Hamilton	SR 24 at Belgreen	1951	current	
SR 188	19.686	31.682	I-10 exit 4 north of Grand Bay	SR 193 at Alabama Port	1952	current	
SR 189	32.857	52.878	SR 52 at Kinston	US 331 south of Brantley	1951	current	Prior to the 1957 renumbering, the north end was at Elba
SR 190	—	—	US 280/US 431 at Phenix City	Georgia state line	1985	1987	Was concurrent with US 431 Bypass; decommissioned when US 280 and US 431 were rerouted onto the bypass
SR 190	2	3.2	US 280/US 431 at Phenix City	Future SR 22 at the Georgia state line at Columbus, Georgia	1987	c. 1988	Decommissioned when US 80 moved onto its current route
SR 191	13.942	22.437	SR 22 east of Maplesville	US 31 at Jemison	1951	current	
SR 192	6.707	10.794	US 84 at Enterprise	US 84 at Enterprise	1987	current	
SR 193	—	—	SR 16/SR 13/US 43 at Chickasaw	SR 17/US 45 at Prichard	1951	1981	Now Wilson Avenue
SR 193	26.349	42.405	Dauphin Island	US 90 south of Mobile	1985	current	
SR 194	—	—	SR 193 at Prichard	SR 16/SR 13/US 43 at Prichard	1953	1981	Now Elm Street
SR 194	1.9	3.1	SR 51 at Clayton	SR 51/SR 239 at Clayton	1987	1995	Former SR 51 Business; replaced by SR 239
SR 195	42.179	67.881	SR 5 north of Jasper	SR 13 at Haleyville	1951	current	swapped with SR 5 in the 1957 renumbering (the northern section of the old route is now SR 13)
SR 196	1.690	2.720	SR 52 at Geneva	SR 27 at Geneva	1955	current	
SR 197	—	—	SR 53 (now SR 93) south of Banks	US 29 east of Banks	1952	1953	Restored in 1962 as SR 201
SR 197	1.023	1.646	US 29 at Union Springs	US 82 at Union Springs	1962	current	
SR 198	1.686	2.713	SR 30 at Clayton	Midway Street at Clayton	1987	current	Former SR 30 Business
SR 199	—	—	Alexander City	Cleveland Crossroads	1952	1957	Replaced by relocated SR 63
SR 199	10.218	16.444	SR 81 at Tuskegee	SR 14 east Golddust	1962	current	
SR 200	1.011	1.627	SR 21 at Piedmont	US 278 at Piedmont	1962	2019	
SR 201	1.553	2.499	SR 93 south of Banks	US 29 east of Banks	1962	current	
SR 202	9.100	14.645	I-20 near Oxford	SR 21 at Anniston	1953	current	
SR 203	—	—	Bankhead National Forest	CR 87 east of Moulton	1952	1955	Now Lawrence CR 203
SR 203	—	—	US 231/SR 1 at Dothan	US 231/SR 1 near the Florida state line	1962	1973	now Houston CR 203; one part restored as SR 605 in 2015
SR 203	3.080	4.957	SR 189 at Elba	SR 125 at Elba	1985	2022	Replaced by SR 12 and SR 189
SR 204	9.620	15.482	US 431 west of Laney	SR 21 at Jacksonville	1958	current	
SR 205	15.185	24.438	US 431 south of Guntersville	US 431 south of Boaz	1953	current	
SR 206	2.111	3.397	US 82 west of Prattville	SR 14 at Prattville	1957	2013	
SR 207	—	—	SR 166 (now SR 71) at Higdon	Bryant	1955	1956	Renumbered SR 73
SR 207	13.959	22.465	US 72 at Rogersville	SR 11 at the Tennessee state line	1956	current	
SR 208	—	—	US 31/US 82 at Montgomery	US 82US 231 at Montgomery	1955	1957	Replaced by relocated US 82
SR 208	0.839	1.350	SR 165 at Cottonton	SR 39 Spur at the Georgia state line	1989	current	
SR 209	—	—	Florida state line	Lowndesboro	1955	1957	Replaced by new SR 21
SR 209	0.325	0.523	Former SR 58 at Centreville	SR 25 at Centreville	1962	2015	Mileage transferred to new SR 382 on old US 82 alignment
SR 210	13.766	22.154	US 231 at Dothan	US 231 (Ross Clark Circle) at Dothan	1955	current	
SR 211	—	—	US 431 Bus. at Dothan	US 431 north of Dothan	1955	1977	Now Headland Avenue
SR 211	4.607	7.414	US 278/US 431 at Gadsden	US 11 northeast of Attalla	1983	current	Former southernmost disconnected portion of SR 227
SR 212	1.145	1.843	SR 14 at Wetumpka	SR 111 at Wetumpka	1987	current	
SR 213	5.753	9.259	US 45 at Eight Mile	US 43 at Saraland	1963	current	
SR 215	—	—	SR 13 south of Tuscaloosa	US 11 at Cottondale	1955	1955	Replaced by rerouted SR 13
SR 215	12.100	19.473	US 82 south of Tuscaloosa	US 11 at Cottondale	1963	current	
SR 216	21.158	34.051	SR 215 at Tuscaloosa	I-20/I-59 near Bucksville	1979	current	
SR 217	26.119	42.034	US 45 at Eight Mile	Mobile CR 21 west of Citronelle	1963	current	
SR 219	47.590	76.589	SR 22 west of Selma	SR 5 north of Centreville	1963	current	
SR 221	6.381	10.269	SR 28 at Canton Bend	SR 41 south of Camden	1963	current	
SR 223	26.452	42.570	US 29 north of Banks	US 82 at Union Springs	1963	current	
SR 225	23.910	38.479	US 31 at Spanish Fort	SR 59 at Stockton	1963	current	
SR 227	—	—	US 431 at Gadsden	US 431 (Now 9th Street and Forrest Avenue) at Gadsden, Alabama	1963	1964	Now Broad Street and Forrest Avenue
SR 227	39.256	63.176	DeKalb/Etowah County Line south of Crossville	US 431 at Guntersville	1967	current	
SR 229	22.781	36.662	I-85 south of Millstead	SR 63 south of Martin Lake	1963	current	
SR 233	14.561	23.434	SR 129 at Glen Allen	US 278 west of Natural Bridge	1963	current	
SR 235	9.093	14.634	US 231/US 280 at Childersburg	Talladega CR 190 at Grasmere	1964	current	
SR 237	4.597	7.398	SR 172 east of Hackleburg	SR 13 at Phil Campbell	1965	current	
SR 239	24.311	39.125	SR 30 at Clayton	US 29 south of Union Springs	1965	current	
SR 241	14.559	23.430	SR 237 south of Phil Campbell	US 278 at Whitehouse	1967	current	
SR 243	19.353	31.146	SR 195 west of Rabbittown	SR 24 at Russellville	1967	current	
SR 245	2.586	4.162	SR 10 at Greenville	SR 185 at Greenville	1967	current	
SR 247	24.849	39.991	SR 24 east of Halltown	US 72 east of Pride	1967	current	
SR 248	6.066	9.762	SR 27 at Enterprise	Fort Novosel	1967	current	
SR 249	5.801	9.336	Fort Novosel	SR 27 at Ozark	1967	current	
SR 251	16.681	26.845	US 31 at Athens	SR 53 at Ardmore	1969	current	
SR 253	31.607	50.867	US 43 at Winfield	US 43 at Hackleburg	1969	current	
SR 255	10.052	16.177	Redstone Arsenal entrance	Bob Wade Lane in Huntsville	1969	current	
SR 257	9.193	14.795	SR 195 north of Jasper	Winston CR 41 near Duncan Bridge	1972	current	
SR 259	12.848	20.677	SR 9 at Equality	SR 22 south of Alexander City	1972	current	
SR 261	5.897	9.490	Shelby CR 17/Shelby CR 52/Shelby CR 91 at Helena	US 31 at Pelham	1972	current	
SR 263	15.132	24.353	SR 185 north of Greenville	SR 21 at Braggs	1972	current	
SR 265	20.048	32.264	SR 21/SR 47 at Beatrice	SR 41 at Camden	1972	current	
SR 267	5.055	8.135	US 29 south of Auburn	SR 147 north of Auburn	1972	2015	Reassigned to SR 147
SR 269	41.524	66.826	I-20/I-59 at Birmingham	SR 69 at Jasper	1972	current	
SR 271	—	—	SR 21 at Montgomery	Former SR 108 at Montgomery	1972	1989	Now Air Base Boulevard
SR 271	5.437	8.750	US 82/US 231 at Barachias	I-85 east of Montgomery	1991	current	
SR 273	15.836	25.486	SR 79 north of Leesburg	SR 35 at Blanche	1973	current	
SR 275	—	—	SR 273 northeast of Leesburg	SR 35 north of Blanche	1973	1979	now Cherokee CR 275, DeKalb CR 148, and SR 176
SR 275	8.250	13.277	SR 21 south of Talladega	SR 21 northeast of Talladega	1985	current	
SR 277	—	—	US 331 south of Ada	US 331 south of Montgomery	1977	1977	Now Montgomery CR 23
SR 277	—	—	US 331 south of Montgomery	US 80/SR 9 in Montgomery	1979	1989	Now Norman Bridge Road
SR 277	9.350	15.047	US 72 south of Bridgeport	US 72 north of Bridgeport	2003	current	
SR 279	9.258	14.899	SR 79 south of Scottsboro	US 72 north of Scottsboro	1979	current	
SR 281	26.834	43.185	Talladega National Forest	US 78 west of Heflin	1981	current	
SR 283	3.077	4.952	Business US 411 at Centre	SR 9/SR 68 north of Centre	1985	current	
SR 285	1.293	2.081	US 431 at Lakepoint Resort State Park	SR 165 north of Wylaunee	1993	current	
SR 287	6.370	10.252	US 31 at Bay Minette	I-65 exit 37 north of Bay Minette	1987	current	
SR 289	1.202	1.934	SR 5 and SR 183 at Marion	SR 14 at Marion	1991	current	
SR 291	0.890	1.432	SR 759 at Gadsden	US 278/US 431 at Gadsden	1991	current	
SR 293	2.500	4.023	SR 110 east of Montgomery	SR 126 in eastern Montgomery County	2004	current	
SR 295	3.185	5.126	US 43 at Grove Hill	US 43 in Grove Hill	2003	current	
SR 297	1.05	1.69	Rice Mine Road	Road	2003	current	Tuscaloosa Eastern Bypass
SR 299	3	4.8	US 84 near Babbie	SR 9 near Opp	2003	2010	Reassigned to SR 9 and SR 12
SR 300	0.780	1.255	US 11/US 43 at Fosters	I-20/I-59 at Fosters	2016	current	Unsigned route
SR 301	0.428	0.689	I-20/US 431 at De Armanville	US 78 at De Armanville	2016	current	Appears on 2017–2018 state map
SR 302	2.352	3.785	US 84 near New Brockton	SR 122 at New Brockton	2016	current	Appears on 2017–2018 state map.
SR 303	7.7	12.4	US 43 south of Linden	SR 69 at Providence	2026	current	Opened in 2026
SR 304	3.696	5.948	US 31 at Tanner	Greenbrier Parkway at Huntsville	2025	current	Fully opened in spring 2025, possible extension VIA Greenbrier Parkway to Interstate 565 south of Greenbrier
SR 306	0.647	1.041	SR 59 near Gulf Shores	SR 161	2025	current	Cotton Creek Drive
SR 307	1.618	2.604	SR 306	SR 161	2025	current	Roscoe Road
SR 308	1.101	1.772	SR 59 near Summerdale	SR 161	2025	current	Branch of the Foley Beach Express
SR 378	2.320	3.734	US 78/SR 5 at Birmingham	US 31 at Birmingham	2016	current	Former US 78
SR 382	4.786	7.702	SR 219 south of Centreville	US 82/SR 6 east of Centreville	2015	current	Unsigned route along the former routing of U.S. 82
SR 482	5.5	8.9	US 82 south of Gordo	US 82 north of Gordo	2026	current	Former alignment of US 82 through Gordo. Designated officially in July 2026.
SR 605	23.420	37.691	US 231/SR 1 near Florida state line	US 231/SR 53 near Midland City	2012	current	
SR 759	0.866	1.394	I-759 and US 411 at Gadsden	SR 291 at Gadsden	1987	current	
SR 959	1.88	3.03	—	—	2026	current	Birmingham Northern Beltline; also known as Interstate 422
Former; Unbuilt or under construction
