= Alabama State Route 134 =

State highway in Alabama, United States

State Route 134

Route information
- Maintained by ALDOT
- Length: 76.795 mi (123.590 km)

Major junctions
- West end: US 331 / US 84 in Opp
- US 84 / SR 167 in Enterprise; SR 85 in Daleville; US 231 in Midland City; US 431 in Headland
- East end: SR 95 near Columbia

Location
- Country: United States
- State: Alabama
- Counties: Covington, Coffee, Dale, Henry, Houston

Highway system
- Alabama State Highway System; Interstate; US; State
← SR 133	→ SR 135

State Route 134 (SR 134) is an east–west state route located in Covington, Coffee, Dale, Henry, and Houston counties in Alabama. It loosely parallels U.S. Route 84 (US 84) between Opp and the Chattahoochee River.

== Route description ==
The route begins at US 331/US 84 along the Opp Bypass. It heads east into southern Coffee County, intersecting SR 189 and SR 87 en route to Enterprise. Upon reaching Enterprise, it does not follow Boll Weevil Circle around Enterprise but instead continues through the city via Damascus Rd, Main St, and East Park Ave. Between Enterprise and Daleville, it is concurrent with US 84, crossing into Dale County en route. In Daleville, it turns off of US 84 for a brief concurrency with SR 85 before turning east and northeast towards Newton. After a concurrency with SR 123 in Newton, it continues east to Midland City, intersecting US 231 en route.

SR 134 follows 3rd St and Kelly Ave through Midland City before continuing east and passing around the north side of the Dothan Regional Airport. It crosses into Henry County en route to Headland, meeting SR 173. After intersecting US 431, SR 134 continues easterly, ending at SR 95 just north of Columbia shortly after entering Houston County.

== History ==
Prior to September, 2010, SR 134 turned east in Headland onto East Church St and did not continue north on Main St to intersect SR 173.

== Major intersections ==
County	Location	mi	km	Destinations	Notes
Covington	Opp	0.000	0.000	US 84 / US 331 (SR 9 / SR 12) to SR 52 – Andalusia, Florala, Elba, Brantley	Western terminus
Coffee		5.881	9.465	SR 189 – Elba, Kinston	
Coffee		14.303	23.018	SR 87 south – Samson	West end of SR 87 overlap
Coffee		14.907	23.990	SR 87 north – Elba	East end of SR 87 overlap
Coffee	Enterprise	23.748	38.219	SR 192 (Boll Weevil Circle) to US 84 / SR 27 / SR 167 – Troy, Dothan	
Coffee	Enterprise	25.737	41.420	SR 88 west (North Main Street) – Elba	West end of SR 88 overlap
Coffee	Enterprise	25.737	41.420	SR 27 north (East Lee Street) to SR 248	West end of SR 27 overlap
Coffee	Enterprise	26.179	42.131	SR 27 south (Geneva Highway)	East end of SR 27 overlap
Coffee	Enterprise	27.115	43.637	SR 88 east (Plaza Drive)	East end of SR 88 overlap
Coffee	Enterprise	27.941	44.967	US 84 west / SR 167 (Boll Weevil Circle / SR 12 west) – Elba, Troy, Hartford	West end of US 84 / SR 12 overlap
Dale	Daleville	33.565	54.018	SR 37 north (Tank Hill Road)	
Dale	Daleville	34.684	55.818	US 84 east (SR 12 east) – Dothan SR 85 south – Clayhatchee	East end of US 84 / SR 12 overlap, west end of SR 85 overlap
Dale	Daleville	35.534	57.186	SR 85 north (Daleville Avenue) – Fort Novosel	East end of SR 85 overlap
Dale	Newton	42.451	68.318	SR 123 north – Ozark	West end of SR 123 overlap
Dale	Newton	44.879	72.226	SR 123 south – Hartford	East end of SR 123 overlap
Dale	Midland City	50.098	80.625	US 231 (SR 53) – Ozark, Montgomery, Dothan	Interchange
Henry	Headland	61.260	98.588	SR 173 north (East Main Street) – Newville	West end of SR 173 overlap
Henry	Headland	62.345	100.335	US 431 north (SR 1 north) – Abbeville, Eufaula SR 173 ends	East end of SR 173 overlap, west end of US 431 / SR 1 overlap
Henry	Headland	62.861	101.165	US 431 south (SR 1 south) – Dothan	East end of US 431 / SR 1 overlap
Houston	Columbia	76.795	123.590	SR 95 (North Main Street)	Eastern terminus
1.000 mi = 1.609 km; 1.000 km = 0.621 mi: Concurrency terminus
