= Alabama State Route 121 =

Highway in Alabama

State Route 121

Route information
- Maintained by ALDOT
- Length: 0.854 mi (1,374 m)
- Existed: 1970s–2005

Major junctions
- South end: US 280 in Camp Hill
- North end: SR 50 in Camp Hill

Location
- Country: United States
- State: Alabama
- Counties: Tallapoosa

Highway system
- Alabama State Highway System; Interstate; US; State
← SR 120	→ SR 122

State Route 121 (SR 121) was a 0.9-mile-long (1.4 km) state highway entirely in Tallapoosa County in the east-central part of the U.S. state of Alabama. The southern terminus of the highway was at U.S. Route 280 (US 280) in Camp Hill. The northern terminus of the route was at its intersection with SR 50, also in Camp Hill.

== Route description ==
State Route 121 began at US 280 (now old US 280) in Camp Hill, heading towards downtown Camp Hill. At downtown Camp Hill there was the town's police station, library, the old post office, and some abandoned buildings. SR 121 then ended at SR 50 in Camp Hill.

== History ==
SR 121 was established in the 1970s and decommissioned three decades later in September 2005 because of the US 280 Bypass opening.

== Major intersections ==
The entire route was in Camp Hill, Tallapoosa County.

mi	km	Destinations	Notes
0.000	0.000	US 280 (SR 38) / CR 89 south	Southern terminus; former alignment of US 280; now Old 280 Road
0.854	1.374	SR 50 (Senator Claude Pepper Drive) / Thompson Street	Northern terminus
1.000 mi = 1.609 km; 1.000 km = 0.621 mi
