= Alabama State Route 87 =

State highway in Alabama, United States

State Route 87

Route information
- Maintained by ALDOT
- Length: 61 mi (98 km)
- Existed: 1940–present

Major junctions
- South end: SR 81 at the Florida state line near Samson
- SR 52 in Samson; SR 134 west of Enterprise; US 84 in Elba; SR 189 in Elba; SR 167 south of Troy
- North end: US 231 / SR 10 in Troy

Location
- Country: United States
- State: Alabama

Highway system
- Alabama State Highway System; Interstate; US; State
← SR 86	→ SR 88

State Route 87 (SR 87) is a 61-mile-long (98 km) state highway that extends from the Florida state line, in Geneva County to Troy in Pike County. At the state line, the roadway continues as Florida State Road 81 (SR 81). Other cities and towns along the route include Elba, and Samson.

== Route description ==
The southern terminus of SR 87 is at the Florida state line south of Fairview. The highway travels through rural areas of southeast Alabama. The highway's northern terminus is at U.S. Route 231 (US 231) in Troy.

== Major intersections ==
County	Location	mi	km	Destinations	Notes
Geneva		0.000	0.000	SR 81 south – Ponce de Leon	Florida state line
Geneva	Samson	9.340	15.031	SR 52 (East Main Street) – Opp, Kinston, Geneva, Airport	
Coffee		23.414	37.681	SR 134 west – Opp	Southern end of SR 134 concurrency
Coffee		14.038	22.592	SR 134 east – Enterprise	Northern end of SR 134 concurrency
Coffee	Elba	31.781	51.147	US 84 east (Davis Street / SR 12) – New Brockton, Enterprise	Southern end of US 84/SR 12 concurrency
Coffee	Elba	33.203	53.435	US 84 west (West Davis Street / SR 12) to SR 189 south – Opp, Kinston	northern end of US 84/SR 12 concurrency
Coffee	Elba	33.352	53.675	SR 189 north (Claxton Avenue) – Brantley	
Coffee	Elba	34.089	54.861	SR 125 north / SR 203 to SR 189 – Opp, Brundidge	
Pike	Spring Hill	53.965	86.848	SR 167 south / CR 3316 – Enterprise	south end of SR 167 concurrency
Pike	Troy	61.552	99.058	US 231 / SR 10 (SR 53) – Montgomery, Luverne, Brundidge	Northern terminus
1.000 mi = 1.609 km; 1.000 km = 0.621 mi: Concurrency terminus
