= Alabama State Route 37 =

Highway in Alabama

State Route 37

Route information
- Maintained by ALDOT
- Length: 0.768 mi (1,236 m)
- Existed: 1998–present

Major junctions
- South end: US 84 / SR 134 at Daleville
- North end: Tank Hill Gate at Fort Novosel

Location
- Country: United States
- State: Alabama

Highway system
- Alabama State Highway System; Interstate; US; State
← SR 36	→ SR 38

State Route 37 (SR 37) is a 0.768-mile-long (1.236 km) state highway in Dale County in the southeastern part of the U.S. state of Alabama. The southern terminus of the highway is at an intersection with US 84/SR 134 at Daleville and leads to the Tank Hill Gate of Fort Novosel, where the highway ends. SR 37 is routed along a two-lane undivided highway for its brief length.

== Route description ==
SR 37 begins at an intersection with US 84/SR 12/SR 134 in Daleville, heading north on two-lane undivided Tank Hill Road through woodlands. The highway crosses CR 114 (Joe Bruer Road) before turning northeast through more woods and ending at the Tank Hill Gate of Fort Novosel.

== History ==
The current SR 37 is the fourth incarnation of the route. In 1940, the original route was designated, heading from near Marvyn to near Oxford. In 1954, the section of the highway from Opelika northwards was redesignated as US 431 and rerouted SR 1. In 1960, SR 37 was extended southward, from Marvyn to Hurtsboro. That highway was replaced in 1985 when SR 51 was extended northward from Hurtsboro to what was then the northern terminus of SR 37 at its interchange with Interstate 85 (I-85). The third route went from Perdue Hill to Little River for a short time, but was gone by 1999, and is now CR 1. The present SR 37 was designated along its current route between 1997 and 1999.

== Major intersections ==
The entire route is in Daleville, Dale County.

mi	km	Destinations	Notes
0.000	0.000	US 84 (SR 12) / SR 134	
0.768	1.236	Fort Novosel (Tank Hill Gate)	
1.000 mi = 1.609 km; 1.000 km = 0.621 mi
