= U.S. Route 84 in Alabama =

US Highway section within the state of Alabama

U.S. Route 84
- State Route 12
- US 84 highlighted in red

Route information
- Maintained by ALDOT
- Length: 237.4 mi (382.1 km)
- Existed: 1926–present

Major junctions
- West end: US 84 near Silas
- US 43 in Grove Hill; I-65 near Evergreen; US 31 near Evergreen; US 29 / SR 55 in Andalusia; US 331 in Opp; US 231 / US 84 Bus. / SR 210 in Dothan; US 431 / US 431 Bus. in Dothan
- East end: US 84 / SR 38 near Gordon

Location
- Country: United States
- State: Alabama
- Counties: Choctaw, Clarke, Monroe, Conecuh, Covington, Coffee, Dale, Houston

Highway system
- United States Numbered Highway System; List; Special; Divided; Alabama State Highway System; Interstate; US; State
← SR 83	→ SR 85
← US 11	SR 12	→ SR 13

U.S. Route 84 (US 84) in Alabama travels west to east across southern Alabama for 237.400 miles (382.058 km). US 84 enters the state from Mississippi west of Silas and exits into Georgia southeast of Gordon. Along its route, US 84 passes through the limits of the towns and cities of Silas, Coffeeville, Grove Hill, Repton, Evergreen, River Falls, Andalusia, Sanford, Babbie, Opp, Elba, New Brockton, Enterprise, Level Plains, Daleville, Dothan, Cowarts, Avon, Ashford.

Between Mississippi and River Falls, with the exception of a small segment near Grove Hill, US 84 is largely a rural two-lane road. Between River Falls and Georgia, the route is a major four-lane divided highway connecting major towns of southeastern Alabama. For most of its route through Alabama, excluding a section in Dothan where it is alternatively known as East and West Main Street, US 84 is internally designated by the state of Alabama as State Route 12 (SR 12).

== Route description ==
US 84, as well as unsigned SR 12, enters Alabama in south-central Choctaw County, near the small, unincorporated community of Isney. After curving through mostly forested land, meeting with several county roads along the way, it comes to its first intersection of note, that being its intersection with SR 17 in Silas. It then continues through more forested land and crosses the Tombigbee River into Clarke County, after which it immediately enters the city of Coffeeville, where it encounters an intersection with SR 69. The two highways travel concurrently through downtown Coffeeville, after which SR 69 splits off and heads south.

US 84 continues eastward through Clarke County and reaches Grove Hill, where it encounters its first major intersection, a diamond interchange with the north-south traveling U.S. Route 43 (US 43). After exiting Grove Hill, US 84 passes through more unincorporated communities as it eventually crosses the Alabama River into Monroe County. 10 miles later, US 84 passes just to the south of Monroeville, where State Routes 41 and 47 (SR 41/47) join it in a three-route concurrency. This concurrency continues until it reaches the town of Repton in Conecuh County, where SR 41 splits off to the south towards Brewton and Escambia County.

US 84 continues eastward through Conecuh County and eventually encounters a small strip of commercial development at its diamond interchange with Interstate 65 (I-65) at exit 93. No sooner has it left the development area than US 84 merges in a concurrency with U.S. Route 31 (US 31). The two highways travel through downtown Evergreen, and US 31 splits off to the north not long after. US 84 then enters Covington County and near-immediately enters into a concurrency with State Route 55 (SR 55) as it enters Andalusia. Here, SR 55 splits off alongside the southbound lanes of U.S. Route 29 (US 29), while northbound US 29 joins US 84 as a northern bypass of downtown Andalusia. Not long after, US 29 splits off to the north, and US 84 continues through unincorporated communities within Covington County before it enters Opp, where it enters into yet another concurrency, this one with U.S. Route 331 (US 331). The two highways create a southern bypass of downtown Opp before US 331 splits off to the north.

Not long after, US 84 enters Coffee County and soon reaches Elba, where it joins two concurrencies, one with State Route 203 (SR 203) and State Route 189 (SR 189), both of which break off while in downtown Elba, and another with State Route 87 (SR 87). After it leaves Elba, SR 87 splits off to the north and US 84 continues through mostly unincorporated areas in Coffee County before reaching Enterprise, where it travels along the city's northern perimeter. It soon leaves Enterprise and Coffee County and makes a brief excursion of 1.119 miles (1.801 km) through Daleville in Dale County before entering Houston County.

Upon entering Houston County, US 84 encounters intersections with three state routes (State Routes 92, 123 and 605) before encountering its last city in Alabama, Dothan. Here, US 84 is a major artery as it forms part of the Ross Clark Circle, a major circular parkway that encompasses two state routes (State Routes 52 and 210) and three major U.S. Routes (US 84, U.S. Route 231 (US 231) and U.S. Route 431 (US 431)). Upon leaving Dothan, US 84 encounters one more stretch of forested land and unincorporated communities before crossing the Chattahoochee River and continuing into Georgia.

== History ==
When U.S. Route 84 was initially designated in 1926, its western terminus was located in Dothan. In 1934, the route was extended west, overlapping US 43 southward from Grove Hill to end at Chatom, quite a distance south of its present route. By around 1950, this gap had been removed. While US 84's western terminus was extended further westward into Mississippi in 1935 and eventually Texas by the next year, there remained a gap in US 84 between Chatom and Waynesboro, Mississippi. By 1950, this gap had been removed and the highway become continuous. It is unknown when US 84 was moved to its current route through Coffeeville.

== Major intersections ==
County	Location	mi	km	Destinations	Notes
Choctaw		0.000	0.000	US 84 west – Waynesboro, Laurel, Natchez	Continuation into Mississippi
Choctaw	Silas	8.529	13.726	SR 17 – Silas, Butler	
Choctaw–Clarke county line		22.614	36.394	Jim Folsom Bridge over Tombigbee River	
Clarke	Coffeeville	23.362	37.597	SR 69 north – Nanafalia	West end of SR 69 overlap
Clarke	Coffeeville	23.672	38.096	SR 69 south / River Street – Jackson	East end of SR 69 overlap
Clarke	Grove Hill	42.753	68.804	US 43 (SR 13) – Jackson, Thomasville	Interchange on US 43
Clarke	Grove Hill	44.147	71.048	SR 295 (Jackson Street)	
Monroe		63.426	102.074	Alabama River	
Monroe	Mexia	72.267	116.302	SR 47 north / SR 47 Truck north – Monroeville	West end of SR 47 Truck overlap; southern terminus of SR 47 / SR 47 Truck
Monroe		76.270	122.745	SR 21 / SR 41 north / SR 47 Truck north – Frisco City, Monroeville	East end of SR 47 Truck overlap; west end of SR 41 overlap
Monroe		76.686	123.414	SR 136 – Excel, Monroeville	
Monroe		80.388	129.372	SR 136 west – Excel	Eastern terminus of SR 136
Conecuh	Repton	84.063	135.286	SR 41 south – Brewton	East end of SR 41 overlap; destination signed westbound only
Conecuh		98.262	158.137	I-65 – Mobile, Montgomery	I-65 exit 93
Conecuh		99.073	159.443	US 31 south (SR 3 south) – Brewton	West end of US 31 / SR 3 overlap
Conecuh	Evergreen	101.739	163.733	SR 83 north (Cooper Street) to I-65 – Midway	Southern terminus of SR 83
Conecuh		107.930	173.696	US 31 north (SR 3 north) – McKenzie, Greenville	East end of US 31 / SR 3 overlap
Covington	River Falls	127.822	205.710	SR 55 north – Red Level, McKenzie	West end of SR 55 overlap
Covington	Andalusia	131.653	211.875	US 29 south / SR 55 south – Brewton, Florala, Destin	East end of SR 55 overlap; west end of US 29 overlap
Covington	Andalusia	133.890	215.475	US 29 north (East Three Notch Street / SR 15 north) / East Three Notch Street (SR 15 south) – Dozier, Brantley	East end of US 29 overlap
Covington	Andalusia	135.469	218.016	Sanford Road (SR 100 west) / Sanford Road	Eastern terminus of SR 100
Covington	Opp	148.006	238.193	US 331 south (SR 9 south) / Florida Highway – Florala, Opp	West end of US 331 / SR 9 overlap
Covington	Opp	150.393	242.034	SR 52 east / Kinston Highway – Kinston, Opp	Western terminus of SR 52
Covington	Opp	151.763	244.239	SR 134 east / East Hart Avenue – Enterprise, Opp	Western terminus of SR 134
Covington	Opp	153.555	247.123	US 331 north (SR 9 north) / Opp-Elba Highway – Brantley, Luverne	East end of US 331 / SR 9 overlap
Coffee		161.820	260.424	SR 141	
Coffee	Elba	165.796	266.823	SR 166 west / South Industrial Boulevard – Brantley	Eastern terminus of SR 166
Coffee	Elba	166.329	267.681	SR 203 north to SR 189 north – Troy	West end of SR 203 overlap
Coffee	Elba	166.416	267.821	SR 203 south to SR 189 – Kinston	East end of SR 203 overlap
Coffee	Elba	167.273	269.200	SR 189 south (Reese Avenue) / Simmons Street	West end of SR 189 overlap; SR 189 signed westbound only; signed as 'To' westbound
Coffee	Elba	167.644	269.797	SR 87 north (Claxton Avenue / SR 189 north) / Claxton Avenue	East end of SR 189 overlap; west end of SR 87 overlap; route signed eastbound only
Coffee	Elba	169.066	272.085	SR 87 south – Samson, Panama City	East end of SR 87 overlap
Coffee		173.932	279.916	SR 302 east – New Brockton	Western terminus of SR 302
Coffee	New Brockton	177.531	285.708	SR 122 north / Byrd Mill Road – New Brockton	Southern terminus of SR 122
Coffee	Enterprise	180.716	290.834	SR 51 north (Rocky Head Road)	Southern terminus of SR 51
Coffee	Enterprise	181.672	292.373	SR 88 east (North Main Street) / SR 192 south (Boll Weevil Circle) to SR 134	Western terminus of SR 88; northern terminus of SR 192
Coffee	Enterprise	181.983	292.873	SR 167 north (Neal Metcalfe Road) / Neal Metcalfe Road	West end of SR 167 overlap
Coffee	Enterprise	183.374	295.112	SR 27 (East Lee Street) – Ozark	
Coffee	Enterprise	183.966	296.065	SR 248 (Glover Avenue / Rucker Boulevard) – Fort Novosel	
Coffee	Enterprise	185.069	297.840	SR 134 west (East Park Avenue) / SR 167 south (Boll Weevil Circle) – Hartford, Panama City Beach	East end of SR 167 overlap; west end of SR 134 overlap
Dale	Daleville	190.693	306.891	SR 37 north (Tank Hill Road) / Hickory Tree Lane	Southern terminus of SR 37
Dale	Daleville	191.812	308.691	SR 85 / SR 134 east (Daleville Avenue) – Clayhatchee, Fort Novosel	East end of SR 134 overlap
Houston		198.268	319.081	SR 92 west – Clayhatchee	Eastern terminus of SR 92
Houston		198.585	319.592	SR 123 – Hartford, Newton	
Houston	Dothan	207.477	333.902	SR 605 (Brannon Stand Road) – Taylor	
Houston	Dothan	210.511 3.370	338.785 5.423	US 231 south / SR 210 (Ross Clark Circle) to SR 52 / US 84 Bus. east (SR 12 east / West Main Street) – Panama City	East end of SR 12 overlap; west end of US 231 / SR 210 overlap; western terminus of US 84 Bus.; mileposts switch from SR 12 to SR 210
Houston	Dothan	4.904	7.892	US 231 north / US 231 Bus. south (SR 53 / Montgomery Highway) – Ozark, Montgomery	East end of US 231 overlap; northern terminus of US 231 Bus.
Houston	Dothan	7.062	11.365	US 431 north / US 431 Bus. south (SR 1 / Reeves Street) – Headland, Eufaula	West end of US 431; northern terminus of US 431 Bus.
Houston	Dothan	9.967	16.040	To SR 52 – Columbia	West end of SR 52 Truck overlap; eastern terminus of SR 52 Truck
Houston	Dothan	10.442 214.893	16.805 345.837	US 431 south / SR 210 / SR 52 Truck west (Ross Clark Circle) to US 231 south / US 84 Bus. west (SR 12 west / East Main Street) – Panama City, Enterprise	East end of US 431 / SR 52 Truck / SR 210 overlap; west end of SR 12 overlap; eastern terminus of US 84 Bus.; mileposts switch from SR 210 to SR 12
Houston		234.598	377.549	Chattahoochee River	
Houston		234.710	377.729	US 84 east / SR 38 east	Continuation into Georgia; eastern terminus of SR 12
1.000 mi = 1.609 km; 1.000 km = 0.621 mi: Concurrency terminus

U.S. Route 84
Previous state: Mississippi	Alabama	Next state: Georgia
