= Alabama State Route 123 =

State highway in Alabama, United States

State Route 123

Route information
- Maintained by ALDOT
- Length: 45.750 mi (73.627 km)

Major junctions
- South end: SR 167 / CR 61 south of Hartford
- SR 52 / CR 61 in Hartford; US 84 southeast of Daleville; US 231 in Ozark; SR 27 / SR 105 in Ozark; SR 51 in Ariton
- North end: US 231 west of Ariton

Location
- Country: United States
- State: Alabama
- Counties: Geneva, Houston, Dale

Highway system
- Alabama State Highway System; Interstate; US; State
← SR 122	→ SR 124

State Route 123 (SR 123) is a 45.750-mile (73.627 km) state highway that serves Geneva, Houston, and Dale counties as a connection between Hartford, Ozark, and Ariton. SR 123 intersects SR 167 and Geneva County Route 61 (CR 61) at its southern terminus, south of Hartford and US 231 at its northern terminus, west of Ariton.

== Route description ==
SR 123 begins at an intersection with SR 167 just south of Hartford. The roadway continues as Geneva CR 61. From this point, the highway travels in a northerly direction where it intersects SR 52 in the central business district of Hartford. From Hartford, SR 123 travels in a northeasterly direction before turning to the north upon entering Houston County and intersecting SR 103. The highway continues through its intersection with US 84 (internally designated as SR 12) and continues in its northerly course into Dale County after crossing the Little Choctawhatchee River. SR 123 continues along its northerly course in Dale County where it intersects SR 134 and travels concurrent with it for approximately 2.5 miles (4.0 km) through the town of Newton. From the end of this concurrency through Ozark, SR 123 continues generally in this northern course in passing both Fort Novosel and Blackwell Field. Upon leaving Ozark, the highway continues in a northwesterly course en route to Ariton where it then turns in a westerly direction where it meets its northern terminus with US 231.

== Major intersections ==
County	Location	mi	km	Destinations	Notes
Geneva		0.000	0.000	SR 167 / CR 61 – Bonifay, Enterprise	Southern terminus
Geneva	Hartford	1.424	2.292	SR 52 (Mill Street) – Geneva, Dothan	
Houston	Wicksburg	10.852	17.465	SR 103 south	Northern terminus of SR 103
Houston		12.854	20.687	US 84 (SR 12) – Enterprise, Dothan	
Dale	Newton	18.917	30.444	SR 134 east – Pinckard, Midland City	Southern end of SR 134 concurrency
Dale	Newton	21.345	34.351	SR 134 west – Daleville, Fort Novosel	Northern end of SR 134 concurrency
Dale	Ozark	27.325	43.975	US 231 south (SR 53) – Dothan	Southern end of US 231/SR 53 concurrency
Dale	Ozark	28.008	45.075	US 231 north (SR 53) / US 231 Bus. begins – Troy	Northern end of US 231/SR 53 concurrency; southern end of US 231 Bus. concurrency
Dale	Ozark	29.946	48.193	US 231 Bus. north / SR 27 (Broad Street) to SR 105	Northern end of US 231 Bus. concurrency
Dale	Ariton	41.654	67.036	SR 51 north – Clio	Southern end of SR 51 concurrency
Dale	Ariton	42.095	67.745	SR 51 south	Northern end of SR 51 concurrency
Dale		45.750	73.627	US 231 (SR 53) – Ozark, Brundidge, Troy	Northern terminus
1.000 mi = 1.609 km; 1.000 km = 0.621 mi: Concurrency terminus
