= Alabama State Route 52 =

State highway in Alabama, United States

State Route 52

Route information
- Maintained by ALDOT
- Length: 82.805 mi (133.262 km)

Major junctions
- West end: US 84 / US 331 at Opp
- US 84 at Dothan; US 231 / US 431 at Dothan
- East end: SR 62 at the Georgia state line in Columbia

Location
- Country: United States
- State: Alabama
- Counties: Covington, Coffee, Geneva, Houston

Highway system
- Alabama State Highway System; Interstate; US; State
← SR 51	→ SR 53

State Route 52 (SR 52) is an 82.805-mile-long (133.262 km) state highway in the southeastern part of the U.S. state of Alabama. The western terminus of the highway is at an intersection with U.S. Route 331 (US 331) at Opp. The eastern terminus of the highway is at the Georgia state line east of Columbia, where the highway crosses over the Chattahoochee River and enter Hilton, Georgia as Georgia State Route 62 (SR 62).

== Route description ==
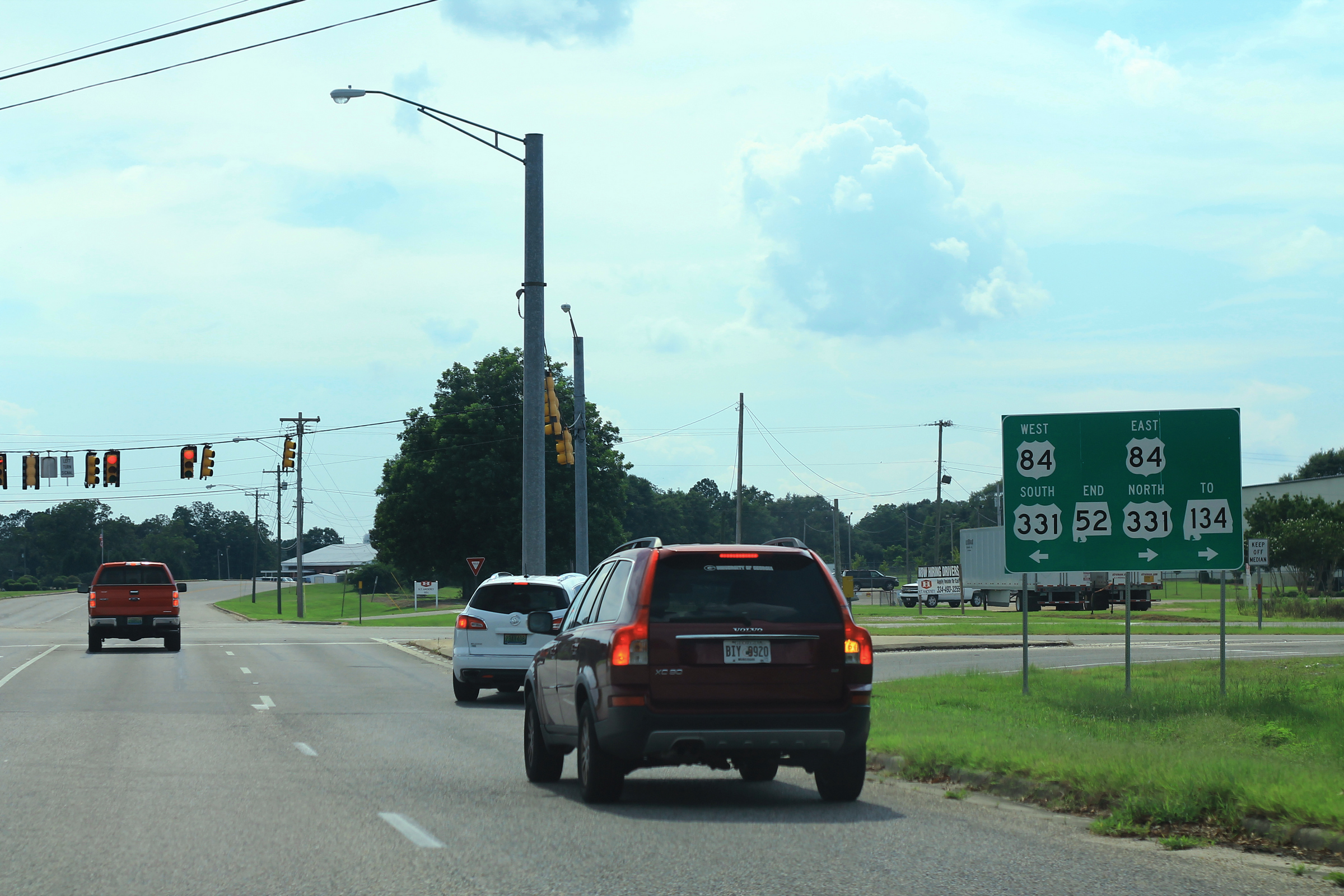
Western terminus at the intersection with US 84/US 331 in Opp

SR 52 serves as a parallel route of US 84. Beginning at Opp, SR 52 assumes a southeastward trajectory as it heads towards Samson in western Geneva County. At Samson, the highway briefly turns to the east before resuming its southeastward trajectory as it approaches the town of Geneva.

East of Geneva, SR 52 assumes a slight northeastward trajectory. It travels through Hartford, the birthplace of Baseball Hall of Fame member Early Wynn, then continues through Slocomb as it heads towards Dothan, the largest city of Alabama’s Wiregrass Region.

SR 52 has intersections with three U.S. Highways at Dothan. On the city’s west side, the highway meets US 231. On the east side of Dothan, SR 52 intersects US 84 and US 431. All three U.S. Highways are concurrent with SR 210 (Ross Clark Circle), a circumferential bypass of Dothan. As SR 52 heads eastward out of Dothan, it travels through rural areas of Houston County as it heads towards Columbia and the Georgia state line at Hilton, Georgia.

== Major intersections ==
County	Location	mi	km	Destinations	Notes
Covington	Opp	0.000	0.000	US 84 / US 331 (SR 9 / SR 12) to SR 134 – Opp, Florala, Brantley, LBW Community College MacArthur Campus	Western terminus
Coffee	Kinston	6.507	10.472	SR 189 north (Hickman Avenue) – Elba	Southern terminus of SR 189
Geneva		14.155	22.780	SR 54 west – Florala	Eastern terminus of SR 54
Geneva		14.754	23.744	SR 153 south / CR 5 – DeFuniak Springs	Northern terminus of SR 153
Geneva	Samson	13.621	21.921	SR 87 (Johnson Street) – Elba, Ponce de Leon, Samson Log House Museum	
Geneva	Geneva	28.742	46.256	SR 196 east – Geneva	Western terminus of SR 196
Geneva	Geneva	30.564	49.188	SR 27 south (North Commerce Street) – Geneva	Western end of SR 27 concurrency
Geneva	Eunola–Geneva line	31.009	49.904	SR 27 north – Enterprise	Eastern end of SR 27 concurrency
Geneva	Hartford	41.101	66.146	SR 167 – Enterprise, Bonifay	
Geneva	Hartford	41.910	67.448	SR 123 (Third Avenue)	
Geneva	Slocomb	48.072	77.364	SR 103 north (North Dalton Street)	Western end of SR 103 concurrency
Geneva	Slocomb	48.149	77.488	SR 103 south (Foster Street) – Graceville	Eastern end of SR 103 concurrency
Houston	Dothan	60.870	97.961	US 231 / SR 210 (Ross Clark Circle) to US 84 – Enterprise, Ozark, Panama City	
Houston	Dothan	62.545	100.656	US 84 Bus. west (West Main Street / SR 12) – Fort Novosel, Enterprise	Western end of US 84 Bus./SR 12 concurrency
Houston	Dothan	63.711	102.533	US 231 Bus. / US 431 Bus. (Oates Street / SR 1 / SR 53)	
Houston	Dothan	65.136	104.826	US 84 Bus. east (East Main Street / SR 12)	Eastern end of US 84 Bus./SR 12 concurrency
Houston	Dothan	65.737	105.793	SR 210 (US 84 / US 431) – Eufaula, Panama City	Interchange
Houston		81.806	131.654	CR 95 south – Gordon, Farley Nuclear Plant and Visitors Center, Omussee Creek Park, West Bank Dam Site Area	Western end of SR 95 concurrency
Houston	Columbia	81.806	131.654	SR 95 north (North Main Street) to SR 134 – Abbeville	Eastern end of SR 95 concurrency
Houston	Columbia	82.805	133.262	SR 62 east – Blakely, Hilton	Georgia state line (Chattahoochee River bridge)
1.000 mi = 1.609 km; 1.000 km = 0.621 mi: Concurrency terminus
