= Alabama State Route 63 =

Highway in Alabama

State Route 63

Route information
- Maintained by ALDOT
- Length: 45.851 mi (73.790 km)

Major junctions
- South end: SR 14 in Elmore County
- US 280 at Alexander City; SR 22 at Alexander City
- North end: SR 9 in Clay County

Location
- Country: United States
- State: Alabama
- Counties: Elmore, Tallapoosa, Clay

Highway system
- Alabama State Highway System; Interstate; US; State
← SR 62	→ SR 64

State Route 63 (SR 63) is a 45.851-mile-long (73.790 km) state highway in the central part of the U.S. state of Alabama. The southern terminus of the highway is at an intersection with SR 14 at Claud, an unincorporated community in Elmore County. The northern terminus of the highway is at an intersection with SR 9 south of Millerville, an unincorporated community in southeastern Clay County.

== Route description ==
SR 63 is a two-lane highway for its entire length. As the highway travels through rural Elmore County, it travels to the northeast until it approaches Eclectic, where it takes a brief turn to the west before turning northward. The highway crosses over Lake Martin as it travels from Elmore County into Tallapoosa County, passing the entrance to Wind Creek State Park along the lake.

At Alexander City, SR 63 intersects U.S. Route 280 (US 280), a major highway heading southeast from Birmingham. SR 63 continues northward through Alexander City into rural Tallapoosa County, then enters the southern tip of Clay County before reaching its northern terminus.

== Major intersections ==
County	Location	mi	km	Destinations	Notes
Elmore	Claud	0.000	0.000	SR 14 – Tallassee, Wetumpka, Montgomery	Southern terminus
Elmore	Eclectic	6.020	9.688	SR 170 west – Wetumpka	Eastern terminus of SR 170
Elmore		12.516	20.143	SR 229 south – Tallassee	Northern terminus of SR 229
Lake Martin		16.130	25.959	Kowaliga Bridge	
Tallapoosa		24.201	38.948	SR 128 east – Wind Creek State Park	Western terminus of SR 128
Tallapoosa	Alexander City	28.334	45.599	US 280 / SR 22 west (SR 38) – Alexander City, Birmingham, Dadeville	South end of SR 22 concurrency
Tallapoosa	Alexander City	30.085	48.417	SR 22 east	North end of SR 22 concurrency
Clay	Cleveland Crossroads	45.851	73.790	SR 9 – Goodwater, Ashland	Northern terminus
1.000 mi = 1.609 km; 1.000 km = 0.621 mi: Concurrency terminus
