= Alabama State Route 206 =

State highway in Alabama, United States

State Route 206

Route information
- Maintained by ALDOT
- Length: 2.111 mi (3.397 km)
- Existed: 1957–2013

Major junctions
- West end: US 82 in Prattville
- East end: SR 14 in Prattville

Location
- Country: United States
- State: Alabama
- Counties: Autauga

Highway system
- Alabama State Highway System; Interstate; US; State
← SR 205	→ SR 207

State Route 206 (SR 206) was a 2.111-mile-long (3.397 km) route that served as a connection between U.S. Highway 82 and State Route 14 in the western portion of Prattville in Autauga County, Alabama.

== Route description ==
The western terminus of SR 206 was located at its intersection with US 82 in western Prattville. From this point, the route traveled in an easterly direction as West 4th Street before it took a turn to the south at South Washington Street in downtown Prattville. From this point its eastern terminus was located two blocks to the south at its intersection with SR 14. SR 206 was decommissioned in February 2013.

== Major intersections ==
The entire route was in Prattville, Autauga County.

mi	km	Destinations	Notes
0.000	0.000	US 82 (SR 6) – Centreville, Tuscaloosa	Western terminus
2.111	3.397	SR 14 (Main Street/S. Washington Street)	Eastern terminus
1.000 mi = 1.609 km; 1.000 km = 0.621 mi
