= Alabama State Route 170 =

State highway in Alabama, United States

State Route 170

Route information
- Maintained by ALDOT
- Length: 11.720 mi (18.862 km)

Major junctions
- West end: US 231 / SR 9 / SR 21 in Wetumpka
- SR 14 in Wetumpka
- East end: SR 63 in Eclectic

Location
- Country: United States
- State: Alabama
- Counties: Elmore

Highway system
- Alabama State Highway System; Interstate; US; State
← SR 169	→ SR 171

State Route 170 (SR 170) is a 11.720-mile (18.862 km) state highway that serves as an east-west connection between Wetumpka and Eclectic through Elmore County. SR 170 intersects US 231 at its western terminus and SR 63 at its eastern terminus.

== Route description ==
SR 170 begins at its intersection with US 231 in Wetumpka. SR 170 then generally travels in a northeasterly course in intersecting SR 14 prior to leaving Wetumpka en route to its eastern terminus at SR 63 in Eclectic.

== Major intersections ==
The entire route is in Elmore County.

Location	mi	km	Destinations	Notes
Wetumpka	0.0	0.0	US 231 / SR 9 / SR 21 (SR 53) – Montgomery, Sylacauga	Western terminus
Wetumpka	0.986	1.587	SR 14 – Prattville, Tallassee	
Eclectic	11.720	18.862	SR 63 – Alexander City, Downtown	Eastern terminus
1.000 mi = 1.609 km; 1.000 km = 0.621 mi
