= U.S. Route 231 in Alabama =

US Highway section within the state of Alabama

U.S. Route 231
- US 231 highlighted in red

Route information
- Maintained by ALDOT
- Length: 306.273 mi (492.899 km)
- Existed: 1926–present

Major junctions
- South end: US 231 / SR 75 at Florida state line near Madrid
- US 84 / US 84 Bus. in Dothan; US 29 in Troy; US 82 near Pike Road; I-85 in Montgomery; I-20 in Pell City; I-59 in Ashville; US 11 in Ashville; US 278 near Brooksville; I-565 / US 72 Alt. in Huntsville; US 72 in Huntsville
- North end: US 231 / US 431 at Tennessee state line near Hazel Green

Location
- Country: United States
- State: Alabama
- Counties: Houston, Dale, Coffee, Pike, Montgomery, Elmore, Coosa, Talladega, Shelby, St. Clair, Blount, Cullman, Marshall, Morgan, Madison

Highway system
- United States Numbered Highway System; List; Special; Divided; Alabama State Highway System; Interstate; US; State
| ← SR 229 | → SR 233 |

U.S. Route 231 (US 231) in Alabama runs north–south up through the eastern half of Alabama for 306.273 miles (492.899 km). US 231 enters the state from Florida south of Madrid and exits into Tennessee, running councurrently with US 431 north of Hazel Green. US 231 passes through the major cities of Dothan, Troy, Montgomery, and Huntsville.

From the Florida state line to Wetumpka, US 231 is a major four-lane divided thoroughfare that connects Central Alabama to the Florida Gulf Coast and Panama City. Between Wetumpka and Arab, excluding its overlap with US 280 between Sylacauga and Harpersville as well as portions through major towns, the road is largely rural and two lanes. Between Arab and the Tennessee state line, the route returns to a four-lane divided highway; the route is upgraded to a limited-access freeway and adjoining frontage roads named Memorial Parkway within the city of Huntsville.

During its route through the state, US 231 runs concurrently with three state highways. Between the Florida state line and southern Dothan as well as between Huntsville and the Alabama state line, US 231 runs concurrent with unsigned State Route 1 (SR 1). Between northern Dothan and Huntsville, the route is overlaid with SR 53, which is unsigned along its portion with US 231 but does have a signed segment north of Huntsville. Finally, while bypassing Dothan, US 231 is overlaid with the signed SR 210.

== Route description ==
In Alabama, US 231 is paired with unsigned State Route 53 (SR 53) from downtown Huntsville to Dothan.

US 231 enters Alabama concurrent with US Route 431. They descend into Huntsville along Memorial Parkway, where the route crosses Interstate 565. US 431 leaves the right-of-way at Governors Drive. US 231 continues south, crossing the Tennessee River on the Clement C. Clay Bridge before climbing Brindley Mountain.

It crosses the southernmost extent of the Cumberland Mountains, crossing Sand Mountain outside Oneonta. It climbs to its highest point at the top of Blount Mountain, descending down a 7% grade to its junction with Interstate 59 outside Ashville. It traverses the Valley and Ridge before reaching Interstate 20 in Pell City. From there, it parallels the Coosa River until it reaches US 280 in Harpersville. Concurrent with US 280, it crosses the Coosa River, serving Childersburg. It follows a bypass of Sylacauga, turning off of the US 280 right-of-way just south of the city.

It immediately climbs into the Upper Piedmont, following a relatively isolated routing. The only city of note along this stretch is Rockford, which has a population of just under 350. It drops down to Wetumpka, where it enters the Gulf Coastal Plain. A few miles later, it crosses the Tallapoosa River into Montgomery.

It turns onto a bypass of Montgomery, where it intersects Interstate 85. After a brief concurrency with US 80, it turns onto another major right-of-way. It leaves the city in concurrency with US 82, which leaves the concurrency a few miles later in unincorporated Montgomery County. US 231 is entirely four-laned south of Montgomery.

On its way to Dothan, the route serves as an important regional connector, serving the college town of Troy, a Walmart Distribution Center in Brundidge, and Ozark, which is a gateway to Fort Rucker.

In Dothan, the route follows the western portion of the Ross Clark Circle. It engages in a brief concurrency with US 84 after leaving a nearly 300-mile concurrency with SR 53. It turns south at a junction with US 431, approximately 333 miles south of its first junction in Huntsville.

The route takes an almost straight routing to the Florida State line, where it continues south towards Panama City.

== History ==
When US 231 was first assigned along with the rest of the United States Numbered Highway System in 1926, the route ran only as far north as Montgomery. In 1952, the route was extended through the rest of the state and on to Indiana.

The section of US 231 in Huntsville was built as a bypass around the downtown area. The original route ran up what is now Whitesburg Drive on the south side of the city, and Meridian Street in the north.

A portion on the north side of Brindlee Mountain, south of Huntsville, was damaged by a landslide in 2020. It was replaced by an elevated section.

== Major intersections ==
| County | Location | mi | km | Destinations | Notes |
|---|---|---|---|---|---|
| Houston | | 0.000 | 0.000 | US 231 south – Panama City | Continuation into Florida |
| Houston | | 0.324 | 0.521 | SR 605 north – Rehobeth, Taylor | Southern terminus of SR 605 |
| Houston | | 7.520 | 12.102 | Graceville (SR 109 south) / Eddins Road | Northern terminus of SR 109 |
| Houston | Dothan | 13.264 0.000 | 21.346 0.000 | US 231 Bus. north (SR 1 north / South Oates Street) / US 431 north / SR 210 (SR 52 Truck / Ross Clark Circle) to US 84 east – Ashford, Headland | North end of SR 1 overlap; south end of SR 52 Truck / SR 210 overlap; southern terminus of US 231 Bus. / US 431; mileposts switch from SR 1 to SR 210 |
| Houston | Dothan | 1.793 | 2.886 | SR 52 (Hartford Highway) – Slocomb | North end of SR 52 Truck overlap; western terminus of SR 52 Truck |
| Houston | Dothan | 3.370 | 5.423 | US 84 west / US 84 Bus. east (SR 12 / West Main Street) – Enterprise | South end of US 84 overlap; western terminus of US 84 Bus. |
| Houston | Dothan | 4.904 24.007 | 7.892 38.636 | US 231 Bus. south (SR 53 south / Montgomery Highway) / US 84 / SR 210 east (Ross Clark Circle) to US 431 north – Eufaula | North end of US 84 / SR 210 overlap; south end of SR 53 overlap; northern terminus of US 231 Bus.; mileposts switch from SR 210 to SR 53 |
| Dale | Midland City | 29.857 | 48.050 | CR 59 / SR 605 south | Northern terminus of SR 605; SR 605 is unsigned |
| Dale | Midland City | 30.594 | 49.236 | SR 134 – Midland City, Pinckard, Newton | Interchange |
| Dale | Ozark | 41.092 | 66.131 | SR 123 south / CR 29 – Newton | South end of SR 123 overlap |
| Dale | Ozark | 41.775 | 67.230 | SR 123 north (South Union Avenue) / Lakeview Road – Downtown Ozark, Ariton | North end of SR 123; Downtown Ozark signed northbound only, Artion southbound only |
| Dale | Ozark | 43.754 | 70.415 | SR 27 north / SR 249 (Andrews Avenue) – Downtown Ozark, Fort Novosel | South end of SR 27 overlap |
| Dale | Ozark | 44.700 | 71.938 | SR 27 south – Enterprise | North end of SR 27 overlap |
| Dale | | 53.911 | 86.761 | SR 51 – Ariton, Enterprise | |
| Dale | | 56.010 | 90.139 | SR 123 south – Ariton | Northern terminus of SR 123 |
| Coffee | No major junctions | | | | |
| Pike | | 62.939 | 101.291 | SR 125 south – Elba | Northern terminus of SR 125 |
| Pike | Brundidge | 64.586 | 103.941 | SR 93 north (East Main Street) – Brundidge | Southern terminus of SR 93 |
| Pike | Brundidge | 65.830 179.592 | 105.943 289.025 | SR 10 east / CR 3316 (S.A. Graham Boulevard) – Brundidge, Clio, Camden, Butler | South end of SR 10 overlap. Mileposts switch from SR 53 to SR 10. |
| Pike | Troy | 170.347 | 274.147 | SR 87 south (Elba Highway) / SR 167 / South Brundidge Street – Elba, Enterprise | Northern terminus of SR 87 / SR 167 |
| Pike | Troy | 168.272 77.150 | 270.808 124.161 | US 29 / SR 10 west (SR 15) – Luverne, Union Springs | Interchange. Mileposts switch from SR 10 to SR 53. |
| Montgomery | | 89.421 | 143.909 | SR 94 west | Eastern terminus of SR 94 |
| Montgomery | | 105.875 171.098 | 170.389 275.356 | US 82 east (SR 6 east) – Union Springs, Eufaula | South end of US 82 / SR 6 overlap; mileposts switch from SR 53 to SR 6. |
| Montgomery | Montgomery | 162.008 | 260.727 | SR 271 north (Taylor Road) to I-85 | Southern terminus of SR 271 |
| Montgomery | Montgomery | 158.668 136.185 | 255.351 219.169 | US 80 west / US 82 west to I-65 (SR 6 west / SR 8 west / SR 9 south / SR 21 south / South Boulevard) / McGehee Road | North end of US 82 / SR 6 overlap; south end of US 80 / SR 8 / SR 9 / SR 21 overlap; mileposts switch from SR 6 to SR 8. |
| Montgomery | Montgomery | 139.293 107.478 | 224.170 172.969 | I-85 / US 80 east (SR 8 east) to I-65 – Montgomery, Atlanta | North end of US 80 / SR 8 overlap; I-85 exit 6; mileposts switch from SR 8 to SR 9 |
| Montgomery | Montgomery | | | Atlanta Highway | Interchange via frontage roads; former alignment of US 80 |
| Montgomery | Montgomery | 111.939 | 180.148 | SR 152 west (Northern Boulevard) to I-65 – Birmingham, Mobile | Interchange; Eastern terminus of SR 152 |
| Montgomery–Elmore county line | | 114.857 | 184.844 | Colonel William R. Lawley Memorial Bridge over Tallapoosa River | |
| Elmore | Wetumpka | | | South Main Street (SR 111 Truck south) | South end of SR 111 Truck overlap |
| Elmore | Wetumpka | 122.395 | 196.976 | SR 170 east – Tallassee | Western terminus of SR 170; Tallassee signed northbound only |
| Elmore | Wetumpka | 122.736 | 197.524 | SR 14 / SR 111 Truck north (Tallassee Highway / Coosa River Parkway) – Tallassee, Prattville | North end of SR 111 Truck overlap |
| Elmore | Wetumpka | 123.483 164.428 | 198.727 264.621 | SR 9 north (Central Plank Road) – Santuck, Central | North end of SR 9 overlap; southern terminus of signed portion of SR 9; mileposts switch from SR 9 to SR 21 |
| Coosa | Rockford | 188.890 | 303.989 | SR 22 | |
| Talladega | Sylacauga | 207.585 43.979 | 334.076 70.777 | US 280 east / SR 21 north (SR 38 east) | North end of SR 21 overlap; south end of US 280 / SR 38 overlap; mileposts switch to SR 38 |
| Talladega | Childersburg | 32.778 | 52.751 | SR 76 east (First Street SW) / CR 008 west (Childersburg-Fayetteville Highway) | South end of SR 76 overlap |
| Talladega | Childersburg | 32.192 | 51.808 | SR 235 north (Coosa Pines Road) / River Run Road | Southern terminus of SR 235 |
| Talladega–Shelby county line | Childersburg | 31.782 | 51.148 | John A. Teague Bridge over Coosa River | |
| Shelby | | 31.106 | 50.060 | SR 76 west (Klein Road) – Montevallo, Columbiana | North end of SR 76 overlap |
| Shelby | Harpersville | 26.100 147.183 | 42.004 236.868 | US 280 west (SR 38 west) / SR 25 south – Birmingham, Wilsonville | North end of US 280 / SR 38 overlap; south end of SR 25 overlap; mileposts switch from SR 38 to SR 25 |
| Shelby | Vincent | 150.904 202.174 | 242.856 325.368 | SR 25 north – Leeds | North end of SR 25 overlap; mileposts switch from SR 25 to SR 53 |
| St. Clair | Pell City | 217.028 | 349.273 | SR 34 east (Mays Drive) / 19th Street South | Western terminus of SR 34 |
| St. Clair | Pell City | 219.073 | 352.564 | To US 78 (SR 4 / Cogswell Avenue) | Interchange |
| St. Clair | Pell City | 220.360 | 354.635 | I-20 – Atlanta, Birmingham | I-20 exit 158 |
| St. Clair | | 221.533 | 356.523 | SR 174 west – Odenville | Eastern terminus of SR 174 |
| St. Clair | | 223.783 | 360.144 | SR 144 east – Ragland, H. Neely Henry Dam | Western terminus of SR 144 |
| St. Clair | Ashville | 233.103 192.786 | 375.143 310.259 | US 411 south (SR 25 south) / CR 33 north | South end of US 411 / SR 25 overlap; mileposts switch from SR 53 to SR 25 |
| St. Clair | Ashville | 196.884 | 316.854 | SR 23 south (Sixth Avenue) | Northern terminus of SR 23 |
| St. Clair | Ashville | 196.908 237.225 | 316.893 381.777 | US 411 north (SR 25 north / Sixth Avenue) / SR 23 | North end of US 411 / SR 25 overlap; mileposts switch from SR 25 to SR 53 |
| St. Clair | Ashville | 239.907 | 386.093 | I-59 – Gadsden, Birmingham | I-59 exit 166 |
| St. Clair | Ashville | 241.036 | 387.910 | US 11 (SR 7) – Attalla, Birmingham | |
| Blount | Oneonta | 253.964 | 408.715 | SR 75 north (Second Avenue East) to SR 132 | South end of SR 75 overlap |
| Blount | Oneonta | 253.999 | 408.772 | SR 75 south (Second Avenue East) / Fifth Street North | North end of SR 75 overlap |
| Blount | Cleveland | 261.605 | 421.012 | SR 160 west / CR 1 south – Hayden, Warrior | Eastern terminus of SR 160 |
| Blount | Cleveland | 262.639 | 422.676 | SR 79 south – Birmingham | South end of SR 79 overlap |
| Blount | | 264.457 | 425.602 | SR 79 north – Guntersville | North end of SR 79 overlap |
| Blount | | 275.547 | 443.450 | US 278 (SR 74) – Gadsden, Cullman, Holly Pond | |
| Blount | | 276.305 | 444.670 | SR 67 north – Decatur | Southern terminus of SR 67 |
| Cullman | No major junctions | | | | |
| Marshall | Arab | 286.206 | 460.604 | SR 69 – Guntersville, Arab, Cullman | Interchange; Arab signed northbound only, Cullman southbound only |
| Morgan | Lacey's Spring | 303.348 | 488.191 | SR 36 west – Hartselle | Eastern terminus of SR 36 |
| Morgan–Madison county line | Huntsville | 306.534 | 493.319 | Clement C. Clay Bridge over Tennessee River | |
| Madison | Huntsville | | | Begin freeway south of Weatherly Road | |
| Madison | Huntsville | | | Weatherly Road / Whitesburg Drive | Northbound exit and southbound entrance |
| Madison | Huntsville | | | Meadowbrook Drive west | Southbound exit and northbound entrance |
| Madison | Huntsville | | | Lily Flagg Road / Logan Drive / Byrd Spring Road | Northbound exit and southbound entrance |
| Madison | Huntsville | | | Charlotte Drive / Logan Drive / Lily Flagg Road | Southbound exit and northbound entrance |
| Madison | Huntsville | | | Martin Road / Golf Road | |
| Madison | Huntsville | | | Airport Road / Jones Valley Road | Jones Valley Road signed northbound only |
| Madison | Huntsville | | | Drake Avenue | Northbound exit and southbound entrance |
| Madison | Huntsville | | | Drake Avenue | |
| Madison | Huntsville | | | Bob Wallace Avenue | |
| Madison | Huntsville | 316.864 333.702 | 509.943 537.041 | US 431 south (SR 1 south / Governors Drive) / SR 53 north | North end of SR 53 overlap; south end of US 431 / SR 1 overlap; mileposts switch from SR 53 to SR 1 |
| Madison | Huntsville | | | Clinton Avenue — Downtown | |
| Madison | Huntsville | 334.700 | 538.647 | I-565 (US 72 Alt.) | I-565 exit 19A-B |
| Madison | Huntsville | 335.207 | 539.463 | To US 72 west (SR 2 west / University Drive) / University Drive | |
| Madison | Huntsville | | | Cook Avenue / Oakwood Avenue | Northbound exit and southbound entrance |
| Madison | Huntsville | | | US 72 west (SR 2 west / University Drive) / University Drive | Southbound exit and northbound entrance; South end of US 72 / SR 2 overlap |
| Madison | Huntsville | | | US 72 east (SR 2 east / Sparkman Drive) / Max Luther Drive / Sparkman Drive | Northbound exit and southbound entrance; north end of US 72 / SR 2 overlap |
| Madison | Huntsville | | | Oakwood Avenue | Southbound exit and northbound entrance |
| Madison | Huntsville | | | East Service Road | Northbound exit and southbound entrance |
| Madison | Huntsville | | | To US 72 east / Max Luther Drive / Sparkman Drive | Southbound exit and northbound entrance |
| Madison | Huntsville | | | End freeway south of Mastin Lake Road | |
| Madison | Huntsville | 352.958 | 568.031 | US 231 north / US 431 north (SR 10 north) | Continuation into Tennessee |
1.000 mi = 1.609 km; 1.000 km = 0.621 mi: Concurrency terminus

== See also ==
- List of U.S. Highways in Alabama

U.S. Route 231
| Previous state: Florida | Alabama | Next state: Tennessee |
