= Alabama State Route 77 =

State highway in Alabama, United States

State Route 77

Route information
- Maintained by ALDOT
- Length: 124 mi (200 km)
- Existed: 1940–present

Major junctions
- South end: US 431 in LaFayette
- SR 21 in Talladega; I-20 in Lincoln; US 78 in Lincoln; US 411 in Rainbow City; I-59 in Attalla; US 11 in Attalla; US 278 near Attalla
- North end: US 431 near Attalla

Location
- Country: United States
- State: Alabama
- Counties: Chambers, Randolph, Clay, Talladega, Calhoun, Etowah

Highway system
- Alabama State Highway System; Interstate; US; State
← SR 76	→ US 78

State Route 77 (SR 77) is a 124-mile-long (200 km) north–south state highway in the eastern part of the U.S. state of Alabama. The southern terminus of the highway is at an intersection with U.S. Route 431 (US 431) near LaFayette. The northern terminus of the highway is at an intersection with US 431 just north of Attalla. North of Talladega, the highway passes the entrance to Talladega Superspeedway, home of the NASCAR Sprint Cup, Xfinity Series, and Camping World Truck Series races that are held annually.

== Route description ==
SR 77 begins in Ridgeville at US 431. It immediately crosses a railroad track and turns south, passing through a ridge cut, before junctioning with US 278. It enters Attalla and junctions with US 11. It turns east-to-west again and junctions with I-59 in Rainbow City. This junction is almost immediately below I-59's junction with I-759. It enters the main part of Rainbow City and junctions with US 411 and crosses the Coosa River. It crosses over multiple forks of the Coosa River as it enters Calhoun County.

It crosses more forks of the Coosa River as it nears Ohatchee. It junctions with SR 144 and leaves Ohatchee. It crosses into Talladega County.

It enters Lincoln, where it junctions with US 78. It continues south and junctions with I-20. It passes by the world-famous Talladega Superspeedway as it enters Talladega. It junctions with SR 34 and enters the city. Within the city, it junctions with SR 275 and SR 21. It turns northwest-southeast and enters the Talledega National Forest. It eventually enters Clay County.

It eventually leaves the National Forest and junctions with SR 130. It maintains an east-to-west path throughout this area. it enters Ashland and junctions with SR 9. There is a highly complex string of intersections in this city, including a point where SR 9 continues on SR 77's right-of-way and another point where the two routes parallel each other as they leave the city to the south. After a journey southeast to Meadow Valley, it junctions with SR 49. It maintains a concurrency with it as it enters the main part of Meadow Valley (the city). It continues on SR 49's right-of-way. It leaves the county near Sikesville. It enters Randolph County.

It maintains a short east-to-west path to SR 22 in Wadley. It maintains a concurrency with it until they reach Louina. SR 22 continues on SR 77's right-of-way. SR 77 turns south and enters Chambers County.

The route has no junctions with other routes of its kind as it makes the long journey south to La Fayette. It junctions with US 431 once again in the northern part of the city. This is SR 77's southern terminus.

This route is a minor route for travel between Gadsden and Auburn as a replacement for US 431.

== History ==
The original route of SR 77 was established in 1940, traveling from LaFayette to Ashland. By 1961, the highway was extended to its current northern terminus in northwestern Etowah County. Until 1985, the segment of the highway between Talladega and Lincoln was concurrent with US 231 Alt.

The earlier routes that predated SR 77 in Talladega and Calhoun counties include the Gilbert's Ferry road and the Jackson Trace, which was used and named after General Andrew Jackson, who, with militia used this part of the route the defeat the Creek people at the Battle Of Horseshoe Bend.

== Major intersections ==
County	Location	mi	km	Destinations	Notes
Chambers	LaFayette	0.000	0.000	US 431 (LaFayette Street / SR 1)	Southern terminus
Randolph		17.663	28.426	SR 22 east – Roanoke	Southern end of SR 22 concurrency
Randolph	Wadley	18.974	30.536	SR 22 west (Lee Street) – Alexander City	Northern end of SR 22 concurrency
Clay		32.034	51.554	SR 49 south – Mellow Valley, New Site	Southern end of SR 49 concurrency
Clay		34.215	55.064	SR 49 north – Lineville	Northern end of SR 49 concurrency
Clay	Ashland	40.245	64.768	SR 9 north	Southern end of SR 9 concurrency
Clay	Ashland	40.300	64.857	SR 9 south / CR 31 north	Northern end of SR 9 concurrency
Talladega	Talladega	63.298	101.868	SR 21 north (Haynes Street/East Battle Street)	Southern end of SR 21 concurrency
Talladega	Talladega	64.474	103.761	SR 21 south (West Battle Street)	Northern end of SR 21 concurrency
Talladega	Talladega	66.259	106.634	SR 275 to SR 21 – Sylacauga, Montgomery, Anniston, Shocco Springs	
Talladega		67.928	109.320	SR 34 west	Eastern terminus of SR 34
Talladega	Lincoln	75.979	122.276	I-20 – Birmingham, Atlanta	I-20 exit 168
Talladega	Lincoln	77.259	124.336	US 78 (SR 4)	
Calhoun	Ohatchee	90.269	145.274	SR 144 – Ragland	
Etowah	Rainbow City	103.242	166.152	US 411 (Rainbow Drive / SR 25) – Ashville, Gadsden	
Etowah	Gadsden	107.407	172.855	I-59 to I-759 – Birmingham, Chattanooga	I-59 exit 181
Etowah	Attalla	109.122	175.615	US 11 (3rd Street / SR 7)	
Etowah		111.881	180.055	US 278 (SR 74) – Cullman, Walnut Grove, Attalla	
Etowah		112.334	180.784	US 431 (SR 1) – Albertville, Boaz	Northern terminus
1.000 mi = 1.609 km; 1.000 km = 0.621 mi: Concurrency terminus
