= Alabama State Route 26 =

State highway in Alabama, United States

State Route 26

Route information
- Maintained by ALDOT
- Length: 14.560 mi (23.432 km)
- Existed: 1940–present

Major junctions
- West end: SR 51 at Hurtsboro
- East end: US 431 at Seale

Location
- Country: United States
- State: Alabama
- Counties: Russell

Highway system
- Alabama State Highway System; Interstate; US; State
← SR 25	→ SR 27

State Route 26 (SR 26) is a 14.560-mile-long (23.432 km) state highway in Russell County in the southeastern part of the U.S. state of Alabama. The western terminus of the highway is at its intersection with SR 51, and the eastern terminus of the highway is at its intersection with U.S. Route 431 (US 431) at the unincorporated community of Seale, approximately 20 miles (32 km) southwest of Phenix City.

== Route description ==
SR 26 assumes an east–west orientation for the duration of its length. It is routed along a two-lane roadway for its duration, passing through rural farmlands in western and central Russell County. Southwest of its terminating intersection with SR 51, the roadway continues towards Union Springs in Bullock County

== Major intersections ==
The entire route is in Russell County.

Location	mi	km	Destinations	Notes
Hurtsboro	0.000	0.000	SR 51 – Union Springs, Eufaula, Opelika	Western terminus
Seale	14.560	23.432	US 431 (SR 1) – Phenix City, Eufaula, Dothan	Eastern terminus
1.000 mi = 1.609 km; 1.000 km = 0.621 mi
