= Alabama State Route 70 =

State highway in Alabama, United States

State Route 70

Route information
- Maintained by ALDOT
- Length: 8.290 mi (13.341 km)

Major junctions
- West end: US 31 at Calera
- East end: SR 25 at Columbiana

Location
- Country: United States
- State: Alabama

Highway system
- Alabama State Highway System; Interstate; US; State
← SR 69	→ SR 71

State Route 70 (SR 70) is an 8.290-mile-long (13.341 km) state highway entirely within Shelby County in the north-central part of the U.S. state of Alabama. The western terminus of the highway is at an intersection with U.S. Route 31 (US 31), just north of Calera. The eastern terminus of the highway is at an intersection with SR 25 in Columbiana. West of the western terminus, the roadway continues as Shelby County Road 22. The interchange of US 31 with Interstate 65 (I-65) at exit 231 is less than one mile (1.6 km) from the intersection of US 31 with SR 70.

== History ==
The intersection of SR 70 with US 31 is approximately 25 miles (40 km) south of downtown Birmingham. Until the mid-1990s, SR 70 between Columbiana and Calera traveled through a mostly rural area of the county. Since then, numerous new housing developments have been constructed along this highway, to house part of the growing population of Shelby County. Besides Columbiana and Calera, SR 70 does not travels through any other incorporated towns or villages.

== Major intersections ==
The entire route is in Shelby County.

Location	mi	km	Destinations	Notes
Calera	0.000	0.000	US 31 (SR 3) / CR 22 west – Montevallo, Calera, Alabaster	Western terminus
Columbiana	8.290	13.341	SR 25	Eastern terminus
1.000 mi = 1.609 km; 1.000 km = 0.621 mi
