= Alabama State Route 34 =

State highway in Alabama, United States

State Route 34

Route information
- Maintained by ALDOT
- Length: 12.965 mi (20.865 km)

Major junctions
- West end: US 231 at Pell City
- East end: SR 77 north of Talladega

Location
- Country: United States
- State: Alabama
- Counties: St. Clair, Talladega

Highway system
- Alabama State Highway System; Interstate; US; State
← SR 33	→ SR 35

State Route 34 (SR 34) is a 12.965-mile-long (20.865 km) state highway in St. Clair and Talladega counties, in the U.S. state of Alabama. The highway begins at its intersection with SR 77 north of Talladega and ends at its intersection with U.S. Route 231 (US 231) south of Pell City.

== Route description ==
SR 34 is a two-lane highway that travels through rural areas in eastern Alabama. Besides the highways it intersects at its termini, it does not intersect with any other state routes or U.S. Highways. Also, besides connecting the cities of Talladega and Pell City, one of the main functions of SR 34 is that it serves as one of several highways that lead motorists to and from Talladega Superspeedway, the site of two NASCAR Sprint Cup races. It is also called Stemley Bridge Road and traverses over the Coosa River and passes Stemley Road Elementary School.

== Major intersections ==
County	Location	mi	km	Destinations	Notes
St. Clair	Pell City	0.000	0.000	US 231 (SR 53) – Sylacauga, Pell City, Birmingham	Western terminus
Coosa River (Logan Martin Lake)		4.540	7.306	Stemley Bridge	
Talladega	Talladega	12.965	20.865	SR 77 – Lincoln, Talladega	Eastern terminus
1.000 mi = 1.609 km; 1.000 km = 0.621 mi
