= Alabama State Route 128 =

Highway in Alabama

State Route 128

Route information
- Maintained by ALDOT
- Length: 1.518 mi (2.443 km)

Major junctions
- West end: SR 63 south of Alexander City
- East end: Wind Creek State Park at Lake Martin

Location
- Country: United States
- State: Alabama
- Counties: Tallapoosa County

Highway system
- Alabama State Highway System; Interstate; US; State
← SR 127	→ SR 129

State Route 128 (SR 128) is a 1.518-mile-long (2.443 km) state highway in Tallapoosa County. The highway's western terminus is at an intersection with SR 63. The route ends at the entrance to Wind Creek State Park along Lake Martin.

== Route description ==
SR 128 is the signed route to provide access to Wind Creek State Park from SR 63. The intersection of SR 63 and SR 128 is approximately 6 miles (9.7 km) south of Alexander City, where SR 63 intersects U.S. Route 280 (US 280). From SR 63, SR 128 heads east through wooded areas and enters the state park. The route turns east onto Hodnett Drive and ends a short distance later.

== Major intersections ==
The entire route is in Tallapoosa County.

Location	mi	km	Destinations	Notes
Our Town	0.000	0.000	SR 63 (Our Children's Highway)	Western terminus
Alexander City	1.518	2.443	Wind Creek State Park	Eastern terminus
1.000 mi = 1.609 km; 1.000 km = 0.621 mi
