= Alabama State Route 31 =

There is no current State Route 31 in the U.S. state of Alabama.

- See U.S. Route 31 in Alabama for the current route numbered 31
- See Alabama State Route 31 (pre-1957) for the former SR 31
