= Alabama State Route 120 =

State highway in Alabama, United States

State Route 120

Route information
- Maintained by ALDOT
- Length: 4.160 mi (6.695 km)

Major junctions
- West end: SR 49 in Reeltown
- East end: SR 14 near Notasulga

Location
- Country: United States
- State: Alabama
- Counties: Tallapoosa County

Highway system
- Alabama State Highway System; Interstate; US; State
← SR 119	→ SR 122

State Route 120 (SR 120) is a 4.160-mile-long (6.695 km) state highway in Tallapoosa County in the east-central part of the U.S. state of Alabama. The western terminus of the highway is at an intersection with SR 49 in the unincorporated community of Reeltown. The eastern terminus of the highway is at intersection with SR 14 west of Notasulga.

== Route description ==
SR 120 is just over 4 miles (6.4 km) long. It travels generally to the southeast and is routed along a two-lane road. It serves as a connector between SR 49 and SR 14.

== Major intersections ==
The entire route is in Tallapoosa County.

Location	mi	km	Destinations	Notes
Reeltown	0.000	0.000	SR 49 – Franklin, Dadeville	Western terminus
	4.160	6.695	SR 14 – Notasulga, Tallassee	Eastern terminus
1.000 mi = 1.609 km; 1.000 km = 0.621 mi
