= Clintonville, Alabama =

Unincorporated community in Alabama, United States

- Unincorporated community
- Location within Alabama Location within the United States
- Coordinates: 31°24′26″N 85°53′39″W
- Country: United States
- State: Alabama
- County: Coffee
- Elevation: 436 ft (133 m)
- Time zone: UTC-6 (Central (CST))
  - Summer (DST): UTC-5 (CDT)
- Area code: 334
- GNIS feature ID: 116274

Clintonville, also known as Indigo Head, is an unincorporated community in Coffee County, Alabama, United States. Clintonville is located at the junction of Alabama State Route 51 and Alabama State Route 122, 2.5 miles (4.0 km) northeast of New Brockton.

== History ==
The community was originally called Indigo Head, due to the indigo plants in the area. The name was later changed to Clintonville, in honor of the local Clinton family. A post office operated under the name Clintonville from 1860 to 1921.

The Clintonville Male and Female Academy operated as the first school in Coffee County to teach beyond the sixth grade. The Alabama Legislature chartered the school on January 11, 1860, and repealed the charter on March 28, 1873.

Company F (known as "The Covington and Coffee Grays") of the 33rd Regiment Alabama Infantry was organized at Clintonville in March 1862 by Captain Daniel Horn. A portion of the 15th Regiment Alabama Infantry also came from Clintonville.
