= Alabama State Route 51 =

State highway in Alabama, United States

State Route 51

Route information
- Maintained by ALDOT
- Length: 114.183 mi (183.760 km)
- Existed: 1940–present

Major junctions
- South end: US 84 at New Brockton
- US 231 near Ariton; US 82 at Midway; US 80 at Marvyn
- North end: I-85 / US 29 / US 280 at Opelika

Location
- Country: United States
- State: Alabama
- Counties: Coffee, Dale, Barbour, Bullock, Macon, Russell, Lee

Highway system
- Alabama State Highway System; Interstate; US; State
← SR 50	→ SR 52

State Route 51 (SR 51) is a 114.183-mile-long (183.760 km) state highway in the southeastern and east-central parts of the U.S. state of Alabama. The southern terminus of the highway is at an intersection with U.S. Route 84 (US 84) near New Brockton. The northern terminus of the highway is at an interchange with I-85/US 29/US 280 at Opelika.

== Route description ==
While it is signed as a north–south route, the orientation of SR 51 is rather irregular. From its southern terminus near New Brockton, the highway heads in a northeasterly direction, traveling through rural areas and small towns in the southeastern part of the state.

SR 51 travels through Clio, the birthplace of former Alabama governor George C. Wallace and Baseball Hall of Fame member Don Sutton. At Clio, the highway turns briefly turns northward, then resumes its northward trajectory as it heads towards Clayton. At Clayton, the highway then turns northwestward then northward as it heads towards Midway.

At Midway, SR 51 joins US 82 and turns westward. The concurrency of the two highways ends east of Union Springs. SR 51 then resumes a northeastward trajectory until it approaches Hurtsboro. The highway then turns northward, continuing this orientation until it reaches its northern terminus at Opelika.

== History ==
When SR 51 was formed in 1940, it covered only the route between Clayton and Midway. The highway was extended to its current southern terminus in 1957, and was extended to its current northern terminus in 1986.

== Major intersections ==
County	Location	mi	km	Destinations	Notes
Coffee	Enterprise	0.000	0.000	US 84 (SR 12) – Enterprise	Southern terminus
Coffee	Clintonville	4.427	7.125	SR 122 west – New Brockton	Eastern terminus of SR 122
Coffee		5.779	9.300	SR 167 south – Enterprise	Southern end of SR 167 concurrency
Coffee		5.888	9.476	SR 167 north – Troy	Northern end of SR 167 concurrency
Dale		19.254	30.986	US 231 (SR 53) – Troy, Ozark	
Dale	Ariton	22.725	36.572	SR 123 north – Troy	Southern end of SR 123 concurrency
Dale	Ariton	23.167	37.284	SR 123 south – Ozark	Northern end of SR 123 concurrency
Barbour	Clio	33.584	54.048	SR 10 – Brundidge, Abbeville	
Barbour	Louisville	39.738	63.952	SR 130 west – Troy	Eastern terminus of SR 130
Barbour	Clayton	48.695	78.367	SR 30 east – Eufaula	Western terminus of SR 30
Barbour	Clayton	49.064	78.961	SR 239 south to SR 30 / West Louisville Avenue – Clayton, Eufaula	Southern end of SR 239 concurrency
Barbour	Clayton	49.933	80.359	SR 239 north / North Midway Street – Smuteye, Clayton, Ventress Correctional Facility	Northern end of SR 239 concurrency
Bullock	Midway	64.901	104.448	US 82 east (SR 6) / CR 47 north – Eufaula	South end of US 82/SR 6 concurrency
Bullock		71.560	115.165	US 82 west (SR 6) – Union Springs, Montgomery	North end of US 82/SR 6 concurrency
Macon	No major junctions				
Russell	Hurtsboro	85.781	138.051	SR 26 east to Main Street / CR 49 – Seale	Western terminus of SR 26
Lee	Marvyn	100.356	161.507	US 80 (SR 8)	
Lee	Opelika	113.598	182.818	SR 169 south – Crawford	Northern terminus of SR 169
Lee	Opelika	114.183	183.760	I-85 / US 29 / US 280 (SR 15/SR 38) – Montgomery, Atlanta	Northern terminus; I-85 exit 60
1.000 mi = 1.609 km; 1.000 km = 0.621 mi: Concurrency terminus

== See also ==
- List of state routes in Alabama
