= Alabama State Route 112 =

State highway in Alabama, United States

State Route 112

Route information
- Maintained by ALDOT
- Length: 30.2 mi (48.6 km)
- Existed: 1962–2004

Major junctions
- West end: US 31 at Bay Minette
- East end: CR 184 near Muscogee

Location
- Country: United States
- State: Alabama
- Counties: Baldwin

Highway system
- Alabama State Highway System; Interstate; US; State
← SR 111	→ SR 113

State Route 112 (SR 112) was a 30.2-mile-long (48.6 km) state highway in the southwestern part of the U.S. state of Alabama. The western terminus of the highway was at an intersection with U.S. Route 31 (US 31) in Bay Minette. The eastern terminus of the highway was at the Florida state line, west of Muscogee, where the roadway continues as Escambia County Road 184 (CR 184).

== Route description ==
SR 112 began at an intersection with US 31 in Bay Minette. It curved southeast towards Gateswood, an unincorporated community. Gateswood was where SR 112 met Baldwin County Route 64 (CR 64). Then, it intersected Baldwin CR 87. SR 112 ended at a bridge over the Perdido River crossing into Florida as Escambia CR 184 (formerly Florida State Road 184).

== History ==
SR 112 was established in 1962. In July 2004, a road exchange occurred: SR 181 extended south from US 90 to US 98 replacing part of Baldwin County route 27, and SR 112 was decommissioned and replaced by Baldwin County route 112.

There was an older SR 112 that was renumbered from State Route 31 (SR 31), a highway from Cullman to Guntersville, in 1946 because the road crossed US 31. That SR 112 became part of an extended SR 69 in the 1957 renumbering.

== Major intersections ==
The entire route was in Baldwin County.

Location	mi	km	Destinations	Notes
Bay Minette	0.0	0.0	US 31 (SR 3)	Western terminus
	16.3	26.2	CR 64 west	
	20.1	32.3	CR 87 south	
	30.2	48.6	CR 184	Florida state line
1.000 mi = 1.609 km; 1.000 km = 0.621 mi
