= Alabama State Route 173 =

State highway in Alabama, United States

State Route 173

Route information
- Maintained by ALDOT
- Length: 14.462 mi (23.274 km)

Major junctions
- South end: US 431 in Headland
- North end: SR 27 west of Abbeville

Location
- Country: United States
- State: Alabama
- Counties: Henry

Highway system
- Alabama State Highway System; Interstate; US; State
← SR 172	→ SR 174

State Route 173 (SR 173) is a 14.462-mile (23.274 km) state highway that serves as a north-south connection between Headland and Abbeville in Henry County. SR 173 intersects US 431 at its southern terminus and SR 27 at its northern terminus.

== Route description ==
SR 173 begins at its intersection with US 431 in Headland. From this point, SR 173 travels briefly towards the southwest before turning to the north as it leaves the town. From Headland, SR 173 follows a northerly track through its northern terminus at SR 27.

== Major intersections ==
The entire route is in Henry County.

Location	mi	km	Destinations	Notes
Headland	0.0	0.0	US 431 (SR 1) – Dothan, Abbeville	Southern terminus
	14.462	23.274	SR 27 – Ozark, Abbeville	Northern terminus
1.000 mi = 1.609 km; 1.000 km = 0.621 mi
