= Alabama State Route 122 =

State highway in Alabama, United States

State Route 122

Route information
- Maintained by ALDOT
- Length: 3.777 mi (6.078 km)
- Existed: 1946–present

Major junctions
- West end: US 84 in New Brockton
- East end: SR 51 north of Enterprise

Location
- Country: United States
- State: Alabama
- Counties: Coffee County

Highway system
- Alabama State Highway System; Interstate; US; State
← SR 120	→ SR 123

State Route 122 (SR 122) is a 3.777-mile-long (6.078 km) state highway in Coffee County in the southern part of the U.S. state of Alabama. The western terminus of the highway is at an intersection with U.S. Route 84 (US 84) at New Brockton. The eastern terminus of the highway is at an intersection with SR 51 north of Enterprise.

== Route description ==
SR 122 begins at an intersection with US 84 (internally designated as SR 12) in New Brockton. It heads northwest on two-lane undivided McKinnon Street. The highway heads through rural areas before passing homes. In the center of New Brockton, the highway turns northeast onto North John Street and continues past more residences. Upon leaving New Brockton, SR 122 heads into a mix of farmland and woodland as an unnamed road. The highway turns more to the east before it reaches its eastern terminus, an intersection with SR 51.

== Major intersections ==
The entire route is in Coffee County.

Location	mi	km	Destinations	Notes
New Brockton	0.000	0.000	US 84 (SR 12) – Enterprise, Elba	Western terminus
	3.777	6.078	SR 51 – Enterprise, Ariton	Eastern terminus
1.000 mi = 1.609 km; 1.000 km = 0.621 mi
