= Curtis, Alabama =

Unincorporated community in Alabama, United States

- Unincorporated community
- Location within Alabama Location within the United States
- Coordinates: 31°23′52″N 86°09′25″W
- Country: United States
- State: Alabama
- County: Coffee
- Elevation: 440 ft (130 m)
- Time zone: UTC-6 (Central (CST))
  - Summer (DST): UTC-5 (CDT)
- Area code: 334
- GNIS feature ID: 116981

Curtis is an unincorporated community in Coffee County, Alabama, United States. Curtis is located at the junction of U.S. Route 84 and Alabama State Route 141, 5.4 miles (8.7 km) west-southwest of Elba.
