= Cleveland Crossroads, Alabama =

Unincorporated community in Brownsville, Alabama

- Unincorporated community
- Location within Alabama Location within the United States
- Coordinates: 33°06′47″N 85°59′15″W
- Country: United States
- State: Alabama
- County: Clay
- Elevation: 879 ft (268 m)
- Time zone: UTC-6 (Central (CST))
  - Summer (DST): UTC-5 (CDT)
- Area codes: 256 & 938
- GNIS feature ID: 156191

Cleveland Crossroads, also known as Elias, is an unincorporated community in Clay County, Alabama, United States.

== History ==
Cleveland Crossroads was originally named Elias in honor of Elias Brantley Cleveland, the first postmaster. After the post office was discontinued, the name was changed to Cleveland Crossroads, also in honor of Elias Cleveland. At one point, Cleveland Crossroads was home to a church, school, mechanic shop, two general stores, and a grist mill. A post office operated under the name Elias from 1886 to 1905.
