= New Brockton, Alabama =

- Town
- Location of New Brockton in Coffee County, Alabama.
- Coordinates: 31°22′20″N 85°55′15″W
- Country: United States
- State: Alabama
- County: Coffee

Area
  - Total: 7.99 sq mi (20.69 km^{2})
  - Land: 7.98 sq mi (20.66 km^{2})
  - Water: 0.015 sq mi (0.04 km^{2})
- Elevation: 449 ft (137 m)

Population (2020)
  - Total: 1,428
  - Density: 179.0/sq mi (69.13/km^{2})
- Time zone: UTC-6 (Central (CST))
  - Summer (DST): UTC-5 (CDT)
- ZIP code: 36351
- Area code: 334
- FIPS code: 01-53856
- GNIS feature ID: 2406973
- Website: www.newbrocktonal.org

New Brockton is a town in Coffee County, Alabama, United States. At the 2020 census, the population was 1,428. The community was named for Huey E. Brock, a settler who came to the region in 1871.

New Brockton is part of the Enterprise Micropolitan Statistical Area.

== Geography ==
New Brockton is located east of the center of Coffee County. The city of Enterprise is directly to the southeast.

U.S. Route 84 passes through the southern part of the town as a bypass, leading southeast 7 mi (11 km) to Enterprise and west 9 mi (14 km) to Elba, the county seat of Coffee County. Alabama State Route 122 runs through the center of town, leading northeast 3 mi (4.8 km) to Alabama State Route 51 north of Enterprise.

According to the U.S. Census Bureau, New Brockton has a total area of 8.0 square miles (20.7 km^{2}), of which 0.02 square miles (0.04 km^{2}), or 0.17%, is water.

== Demographics ==
Historical population
Census	Pop.	Note	%±
1910	328		—
1920	467		42.4%
1930	727		55.7%
1940	878		20.8%
1950	1,055		20.2%
1960	1,093		3.6%
1970	1,374		25.7%
1980	1,392		1.3%
1990	1,184		−14.9%
2000	1,250		5.6%
2010	1,146		−8.3%
2020	1,428		24.6%
U.S. Decennial Census; 2013 Estimate

=== Racial and ethnic composition ===
New Brockton town, Alabama – Racial and ethnic composition Note: the US Census treats Hispanic/Latino as an ethnic category. This table excludes Latinos from the racial categories and assigns them to a separate category. Hispanics/Latinos may be of any race.
Race / Ethnicity (NH = Non-Hispanic)	Pop 2000	Pop 2010	Pop 2020	% 2000	% 2010	% 2020
White alone (NH)	839	780	973	67.12%	68.06%	68.14%
Black or African American alone (NH)	330	240	264	26.40%	20.94%	18.49%
Native American or Alaska Native alone (NH)	35	63	20	2.80%	5.50%	1.40%
Asian alone (NH)	0	6	4	0.00%	0.52%	0.28%
Native Hawaiian or Pacific Islander alone (NH)	0	0	0	0.00%	0.00%	0.00%
Other race alone (NH)	0	0	9	0.00%	0.00%	0.63%
Mixed race or Multiracial (NH)	37	28	58	2.96%	2.44%	4.06%
Hispanic or Latino (any race)	9	29	100	0.72%	2.53%	7.00%
Total	1,250	1,146	1,428	100.00%	100.00%	100.00%

=== 2020 census ===
As of the 2020 census, New Brockton had a population of 1,428. The median age was 38.1 years. 23.5% of residents were under the age of 18 and 15.6% of residents were 65 years of age or older. For every 100 females there were 103.1 males, and for every 100 females age 18 and over there were 103.2 males age 18 and over.

0.0% of residents lived in urban areas, while 100.0% lived in rural areas.

There were 551 households in New Brockton, of which 36.7% had children under the age of 18 living in them. Of all households, 49.0% were married-couple households, 17.4% were households with a male householder and no spouse or partner present, and 28.7% were households with a female householder and no spouse or partner present. About 24.5% of all households were made up of individuals and 12.0% had someone living alone who was 65 years of age or older.

There were 637 housing units, of which 13.5% were vacant. The homeowner vacancy rate was 1.5% and the rental vacancy rate was 2.4%.

Racial composition as of the 2020 census
Race	Number	Percent
White	1,006	70.4%
Black or African American	265	18.6%
American Indian and Alaska Native	25	1.8%
Asian	4	0.3%
Native Hawaiian and Other Pacific Islander	0	0.0%
Some other race	58	4.1%
Two or more races	70	4.9%

=== 2010 census ===
At the 2010 census there were 1,146 people, 469 households, and 327 families living in the town. The population density was 143 inhabitants per square mile (55/km^{2}). There were 561 housing units at an average density of 70.1 per square mile (27.1/km^{2}). The racial makeup of the town was 70.1% White, 21.0% Black or African American, 5.5% Native American, 0.2% from other races, and 2.7% from two or more races. 2.5% of the population were Hispanic or Latino of any race. Of the 469 households 27.3% had children under the age of 18 living with them, 50.3% were married couples living together, 15.6% had a female householder with no husband present, and 30.3% were non-families. 27.7% of households were one person and 10.9% were one person aged 65 or older. The average household size was 2.44 and the average family size was 2.97.

The age distribution was 23.2% under the age of 18, 8.5% from 18 to 24, 26.4% from 25 to 44, 26.8% from 45 to 64, and 15.2% 65 or older. The median age was 38.5 years. For every 100 females, there were 92.3 males. For every 100 females age 18 and over, there were 89.3 males.

The median household income was $33,125 and the median family income was $38,300. Males had a median income of $36,500 versus $18,594 for females.

=== 2000 census ===
At the 2000 census there were 1,250 people, 465 households, and 336 families living in the town. The population density was 156.5 inhabitants per square mile (60.4/km^{2}). There were 555 housing units at an average density of 69.5 per square mile (26.8/km^{2}). The racial makeup of the town was 67.36% White, 26.64% Black or African American, 2.80% Native American, 0.24% from other races, and 2.96% from two or more races. 0.72% of the population were Hispanic or Latino of any race. Of the 465 households 29.2% had children under the age of 18 living with them, 52.9% were married couples living together, 16.6% had a female householder with no husband present, and 27.7% were non-families. 26.0% of households were one person and 14.0% were one person aged 65 or older. The average household size was 2.46 and the average family size was 2.95.

The age distribution was 22.0% under the age of 18, 10.6% from 18 to 24, 26.6% from 25 to 44, 24.9% from 45 to 64, and 15.8% 65 or older. The median age was 38 years. For every 100 females, there were 101.6 males. For every 100 females age 18 and over, there were 103.1 males.

The median household income was $24,032 and the median family income was $26,914. Males had a median income of $26,711 versus $20,417 for females.

== Notable people ==
- John W. Brock, US Navy officer who received the Navy Cross posthumously for his actions during World War II
- Jan Crouch, co-founder of Trinity Broadcasting Network
- Don Helms, pedal steel guitar player in Hank Williams' Drifting Cowboys
- Chester Higgins, Jr., photographer for The New York Times
- Wayne Mixson, 39th Governor of Florida
- Abdul Salaam, former defensive tackle for the New York Jets
