= Hartford, Alabama =

City in Alabama, United States

Hartford
- City
- Seal

- Location of Hartford in Geneva County, Alabama.
- Coordinates: 31°06′20″N 85°41′30″W
- Country: United States
- State: Alabama
- County: Geneva

Area
  - Total: 6.25 sq mi (16.19 km^{2})
  - Land: 6.24 sq mi (16.15 km^{2})
  - Water: 0.015 sq mi (0.04 km^{2})
- Elevation: 272 ft (83 m)

Population (2020)
  - Total: 2,651
  - Density: 425.1/sq mi (164.13/km^{2})
- Time zone: UTC-6 (Central (CST))
  - Summer (DST): UTC-5 (CDT)
- ZIP code: 36344
- Area code: 334
- FIPS code: 01-33424
- GNIS feature ID: 2403808
- Website: City of Hartford, Alabama

Hartford is a city in Geneva County, Alabama, United States. It incorporated in 1896. It is part of the Dothan, Alabama Metropolitan Statistical Area. At the 2020 census, the population was 2,651, an increase over the figure of 2,624 tabulated in 2010.

== Geography ==
According to the U.S. Census Bureau, the city has a total area of 6.2 square miles (16 km^{2}), of which 6.2 square miles (16 km^{2}) is land and 0.16% is water.

== Demographics ==
Historical population
Census	Pop.	Note	%±
1900	382		—
1910	1,159		203.4%
1920	1,561		34.7%
1930	1,419		−9.1%
1940	1,494		5.3%
1950	1,655		10.8%
1960	1,956		18.2%
1970	2,648		35.4%
1980	2,647		0.0%
1990	2,448		−7.5%
2000	2,369		−3.2%
2010	2,624		10.8%
2020	2,651		1.0%
U.S. Decennial Census; 2013 Estimate

=== Racial and ethnic composition ===
Hartford city, Alabama – Racial and ethnic composition Note: the US Census treats Hispanic/Latino as an ethnic category. This table excludes Latinos from the racial categories and assigns them to a separate category. Hispanics/Latinos may be of any race.
Race / Ethnicity (NH = Non-Hispanic)	Pop 1980	Pop 1990	Pop 2000	Pop 2010	Pop 2020	% 1980	% 1990	% 2000	% 2010	% 2020
White alone (NH)	2,000	1,864	1,844	2,017	1,915	75.56%	76.14%	77.84%	76.87%	72.24%
Black or African American alone (NH)	605	558	463	470	458	22.86%	22.79%	19.54%	17.91%	17.28%
Native American or Alaska Native alone (NH)	4	9	9	11	14	0.15%	0.37%	0.38%	0.42%	0.53%
Asian alone (NH)	0	1	0	3	3	0.00%	0.04%	0.00%	0.11%	0.11%
Native Hawaiian or Pacific Islander alone (NH)	x	x	0	0	0	x	x	0.00%	0.00%	0.00%
Other race alone (NH)	0	0	0	1	16	0.00%	0.00%	0.00%	0.04%	0.60%
Mixed race or Multiracial (NH)	x	x	13	41	124	x	x	0.55%	1.56%	4.68%
Hispanic or Latino (any race)	38	16	40	81	121	1.44%	0.65%	1.69%	3.09%	4.56%
Total	2,647	2,448	2,369	2,624	2,651	100.00%	100.00%	100.00%	100.00%	100.00%

=== 2020 census ===
As of the 2020 census, Hartford had a population of 2,651 and 1,096 households, including 565 families.

The median age was 42.6 years. 21.6% of residents were under the age of 18 and 22.9% were 65 years of age or older. For every 100 females there were 87.3 males, and for every 100 females age 18 and over there were 85.0 males age 18 and over.

There were 1,096 households in Hartford, of which 30.8% had children under the age of 18 living in them. Of all households, 41.0% were married-couple households, 18.1% were households with a male householder and no spouse or partner present, and 34.3% were households with a female householder and no spouse or partner present. About 31.2% of all households were made up of individuals and 16.4% had someone living alone who was 65 years of age or older.

There were 1,207 housing units, of which 9.2% were vacant. The homeowner vacancy rate was 1.9% and the rental vacancy rate was 6.1%.

0.0% of residents lived in urban areas, while 100.0% lived in rural areas.

=== 2010 census ===
At the 2010 census there were 2,624 people, 1,059 households, and 677 families living in the city. The population density was 423.2 inhabitants per square mile (163.4/km^{2}). There were 1,196 housing units at an average density of 192.9 per square mile (74.5/km^{2}). The racial makeup of the city was 77.9% White, 17.9% Black or African American, 0.6% Native American, 1.8% from other races, and 1.8% from two or more races. 3.1% of the population were Hispanic or Latino of any race. Of the 1,059 households 23.0% had children under the age of 18 living with them, 44.3% were married couples living together, 15.6% had a female householder with no husband present, and 36.1% were non-families. 32.5% of households were one person and 16.2% were one person aged 65 or older. The average household size was 2.40 and the average family size was 3.02.

The age distribution was 21.8% under the age of 18, 9.5% from 18 to 24, 20.9% from 25 to 44, 26.1% from 45 to 64, and 21.6% 65 or older. The median age was 42.9 years. For every 100 females, there were 87.0 males. For every 100 females age 18 and over, there were 94.0 males.

The median household income was $26,086 and the median family income was $36,900. Males had a median income of $31,505 versus $17,369 for females. The per capita income for the city was $16,507. About 14.9% of families and 21.1% of the population were below the poverty line, including 16.0% of those under age 18 and 20.6% of those age 65 or over.

=== 2000 census ===
At the 2000 census there were 2,369 people, 966 households, and 647 families living in the city. The population density was 380.1 inhabitants per square mile (146.8/km^{2}). There were 1,121 housing units at an average density of 179.9 per square mile (69.5/km^{2}). The racial makeup of the city was 79.11% White, 19.63% Black or African American, 0.42% Native American, 0.30% from other races, and 0.55% from two or more races. 1.69% of the population were Hispanic or Latino of any race. Of the 966 households 27.3% had children under the age of 18 living with them, 49.0% were married couples living together, 13.8% had a female householder with no husband present, and 33.0% were non-families. 31.1% of households were one person and 15.0% were one person aged 65 or older. The average household size was 2.35 and the average family size was 2.90.

The age distribution was 22.9% under the age of 18, 6.4% from 18 to 24, 24.1% from 25 to 44, 24.5% from 45 to 64, and 22.1% 65 or older. The median age was 43 years. For every 100 females, there were 84.5 males. For every 100 females age 18 and over, there were 77.5 males.

The median household income was $23,324 and the median family income was $30,919. Males had a median income of $25,843 versus $21,838 for females. The per capita income for the city was $13,290. About 19.9% of families and 19.8% of the population were below the poverty line, including 29.0% of those under age 18 and 19.1% of those age 65 or over.

== Notable people ==
- Ralph Brown Draughon, president of Auburn University from 1947 to 1965
- Dixie Howell, member of the College Football Hall of Fame. He played for the University of Alabama
- Scott Peacock, award-winning chef of American Southern cuisine
- Early Wynn, member of the Baseball Hall of Fame

== See also ==
- List of municipalities in Alabama
