= List of Interstate Highways in Alabama =

- Highway markers for I-65 and I-459
- Interstate Highways highlighted in red

Highway names
- Interstates: Interstate nn (I-nn)
- US Highways: U.S. Route nn (US-nn)
- State: State Route nn (SR-nn)

System links
- Alabama State Highway System; Interstate; US; State

The Interstate Highways in Alabama are the components of the Interstate Highway System in the U.S. state of Alabama. All numbered highways in Alabama are maintained by the Alabama Department of Transportation (ALDOT).

Currently, there are 11 routes and 1,130 miles (1,820 km) of Interstates in Alabama. The Interstate with the longest segment in Alabama is Interstate 65, covering 367.00 miles (590.63 km); the shortest is Interstate 359, covering 2.30 miles (3.70 km). There are six Interstate primary routes and five Interstate auxiliary routes serving the six largest cities in the state, and 22 of the 25 largest.

== Primary Interstate highways ==
Number	Length (mi)	Length (km)	Southern or western terminus	Northern or eastern terminus	Formed	Removed	Notes
I-10	66.27	106.65	I-10 at the Mississippi state line	I-10 at the Florida state line	—	—	
I-14	—	—	I-14 at the Mississippi state line near Isney (undecided)	I-14 at the Georgia state line near Fort Benning (undecided)	proposed	—	Proposed "14th Amendment Highway"
I-20	214.78	345.65	I-20 / I-59 at the Mississippi state line	I-20 at the Georgia state line	—	—	
I-22	96.48	155.27	I-22 / US 78 at the Mississippi state line	I-65 / US 31 in Birmingham	2012	current	
I-59	241.18	388.14	I-20 / I-59 at the Mississippi state line	I-59 at the Georgia state line	—	—	
I-59B	—	—	Bypass for I-59 around Birmingham, AL		—	—	Renumbered as I-459
I-65	366.23	589.39	I-10 in Mobile	I-65 at the Tennessee state line	—	—	
I-85	80.01	128.76	I-65 & Day Street in Montgomery	I-85 at the Georgia state line	—	—	Proposed southern extension to I-20/I-59 near Cuba. This extension is part of the future I-14 corridor.
Proposed and unbuilt

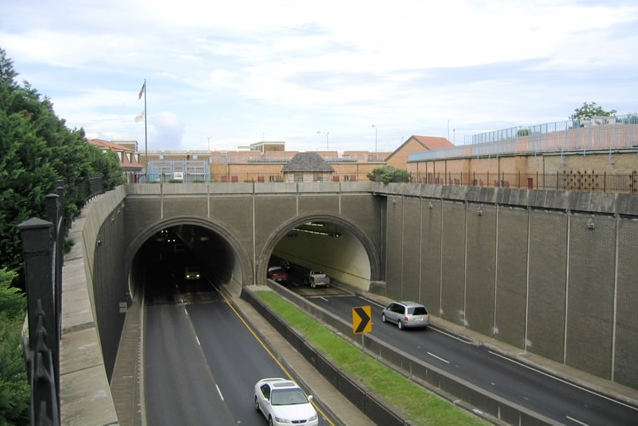
I-10 entering the George Wallace Tunnel in Mobile

== Auxiliary Interstate highways ==
Number	Length (mi)	Length (km)	Southern or western terminus	Northern or eastern terminus	Formed	Removed	Notes
I-165	4.90	7.89	US 90/Truck US 98/SR 16 at Beauregard & North Water Streets in Mobile	I-65 in Prichard	—	—	I-165 serves as a spur route connecting downtown Mobile with Interstate 65 northwest of Mobile.
I-210	5.10	8.21	I-10 in Mobile	I-65 in Prichard	1991	1994	I-210 was a planned spur route connecting I-10 in downtown Mobile with Interstate 65 northwest of Mobile. It is now signed as I-165 and does not connect to I-10.
I-222	2.26	3.64	I-22/US 78 in Brookside	I-422 in Birmingham	proposed	—	I-222 will provide connection between I-422 and I-22 which due to topography will not have a direct interchange.
I-359	2.30	3.70	I-20/I-59/US 11/SR 7/SR-69	US 11/US 43/SR 13/SR 69	—	—	I-359 serves as a spur route connecting I-20/I-59 with downtown Tuscaloosa.
I-422	51.04	82.14	I-20/I-59/I-459 at Bessemer	I-59 in Trussville	proposed	—	I-422 is the under-construction Birmingham North Beltline set to bypass the Birmingham metropolis, from I-59 to I-59. It also carries the designation Alabama State Route 959.
I-459	32.80	52.79	I-20/I-59/US 11/SR 5/SR 7 near Bessemer	I-59 at Trussville	—	—	I-459 forms a partial southern loop around Birmingham, connecting I-20/I-59 in Bessemer and I-59 near Trussville. There are plans to extend the loop around the north of the city, as Interstate 422.
I-565	21.40	34.44	I-65/SR 20 in Decatur	US 72 in Huntsville	1991	current	I-565 serves as a spur route connecting I-65 with Huntsville and crossing the City of Huntsville.
I-685	14	23	I-65 at Montgomery	I-85/US 80 in Montgomery	proposed	—	With the completion of the Montgomery Southern Bypass, I-85 will be shifted to that new route. AASHTO approved in October 2010 the co-signing of I-685 to be put up along with current I-85 up to the point it moves to the new roadway.
I-759	4.50	7.24	I-59 in Attalla	US 411/SR 25/SR 759 in Gadsden	—	—	I-759 serves as a spur route from I-59 to the Gadsden metropolis.
Former; Proposed and unbuilt

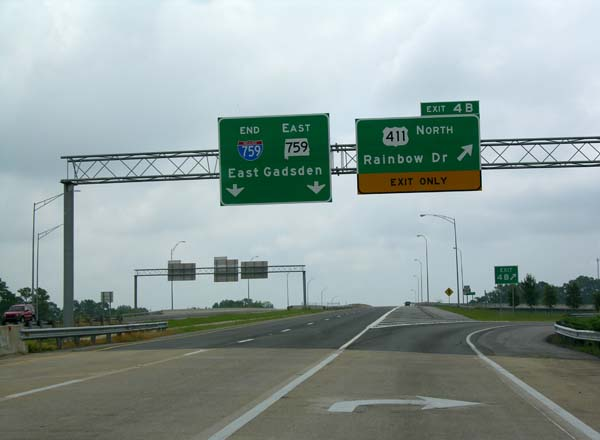
Eastern terminus of I-759 in Gadsden
