= Alabama Department of Transportation =

Government agency in Alabama, US

Alabama Department of Transportation (ALDOT)
- Seal

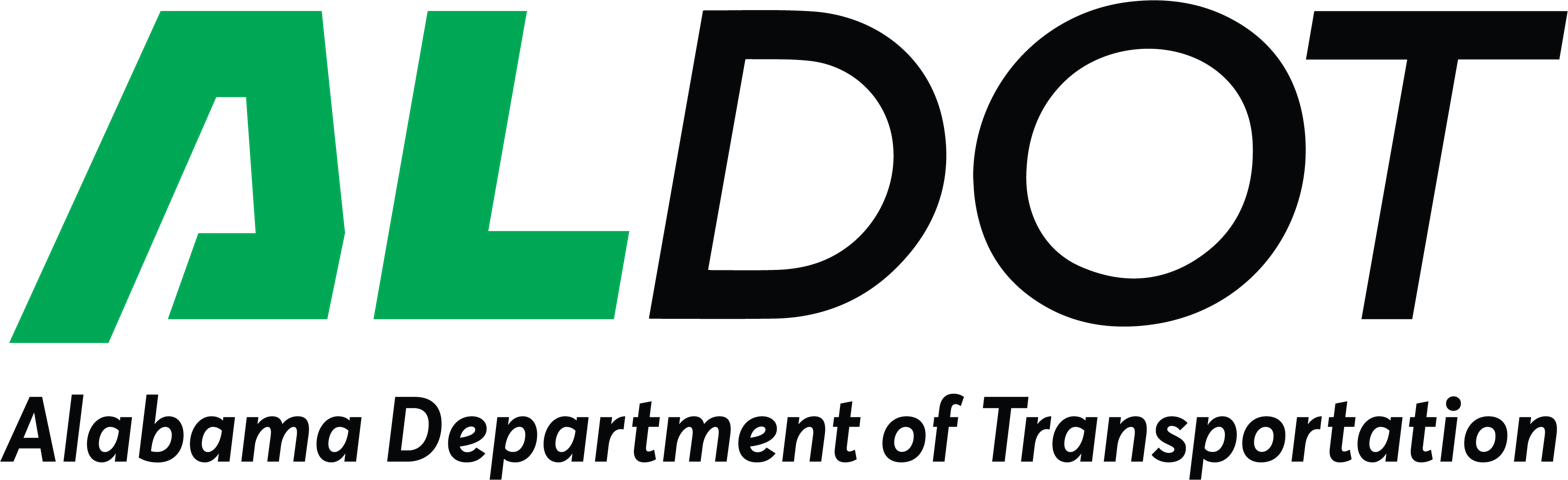
- Logo

Agency overview
- Formed: March 2, 1939
- Preceding agency: Department of Highway
- Jurisdiction: The State of Alabama
- Headquarters: 1409 Coliseum Blvd #2060, Montgomery, Alabama
- Annual budget: 1,676,000,000 USD (2022)
- Agency executives: John R. Cooper, Transportation Director; George H. Conner, Deputy Director, Operations; Lamar S. Woodham, Jr., Deputy Director, Administration; Willie L. Bradley, Jr., Deputy Director, Fleet Management; Edward N. Austin, Chief Engineer; Clay McBrien, Assistant Chief Engineer, Policy and Planning; Kyle M. Leverette, P.E., Assistant Chief Engineer, Pre-Construction
- Website: dot.state.al.us

The Alabama Department of Transportation (ALDOT) is the government agency responsible for transportation infrastructure in Alabama. The department is organized into five geographic regions, with a central office located in Montgomery, AL. The central office is organized into the Office of the Transportation Director and the Office of the Chief Engineer. The five region engineers report to the director and deputy director, operations. The organization of the various bureaus and offices are designed to report to the director and the deputy directors, chief engineer, or the assistant chief engineers. The department has several boards and committees that operate either within a bureau or as a cooperative effort among several bureaus or regions.
