= Interstate 59 in Alabama =

Interstate Highway in Alabama, United States

Interstate 59
- I-59 highlighted in red

Route information
- Maintained by ALDOT
- Length: 239.91 mi (386.10 km)
- Existed: August 14, 1957–present
- History: Completed June 2, 1980
- NHS: Entire route

Major junctions
- South end: I-20 / I-59 at the Mississippi state line west of Cuba
- US 11 (multiple times); I-359 / SR 69 in Tuscaloosa; US 82 in Tuscaloosa; I-459 in Bessemer and Trussville; I-65 in Birmingham; US 31 / US 280 in Birmingham; I-20 in Birmingham; I-759 in Gadsden; US 278 / US 431 in Attalla
- North end: I-59 at the Georgia state line northeast of Hammondville

Location
- Country: United States
- State: Alabama
- Counties: Sumter, Greene, Tuscaloosa, Jefferson, St. Clair, Etowah, DeKalb

Highway system
- Interstate Highway System; Main; Auxiliary; Suffixed; Business; Future; Alabama State Highway System; Interstate; US; State
| ← SR 58 | → SR 59 |

Interstate 59 (I-59) is a part of the Interstate Highway System that runs 445.23 miles (716.53 km) from Slidell, Louisiana, to just outside of Wildwood, Georgia. In the U.S. state of Alabama, I-59 travels 239.91 miles (386.10 km) from the Mississippi state line near Cuba to the Georgia state line northeast of Hammondville. It serves as the main Interstate Highway connecting the cities of Tuscaloosa, Birmingham, and Gadsden. For more than half of its length in the state, I-59 runs concurrently with I-20. Past the routes' split in eastern Birmingham on their way to Georgia, I-20 takes a shorter path through Birmingham's eastern suburbs and the southern foothills of the Appalachian Mountains, while I-59 follows a longer route through the city's northern suburbs and over the mountains on its way to Gadsden.

Of the four states which I-59 covers, the segment in Alabama is the longest and accounts for more than half of its entire length overall. The Interstate parallels the older U.S. Route 11 (US 11) corridor for its full extent within the state. I-59 was first signed into the Interstate Highway System in 1957, and construction began in 1960. The portions of the highway were completed slowly, with the very last segment being opened in 1980. Since then, many projects have been undertaken on I-59 to relieve congestion within the metropolitan areas it passes. The Interstate has three auxiliary routes: I-359 in Tuscaloosa, I-459 within the Birmingham metropolitan area, and I-759 in Gadsden.

== Route description ==
Like all other Interstate, U.S., and state highways in Alabama, I-59 is a part of the National Highway System for its entire length in the state. Annual average daily traffic along the Interstate varied, with the busiest stretch of the Interstate being the concurrency with I-20 at the SR 79 interchange east of Birmingham, carrying a total of 150,954 vehicles in 2023. The lowest amount was 15,342 vehicles in northeastern DeKalb County near the Georgia state line.

=== Mississippi to Birmingham ===
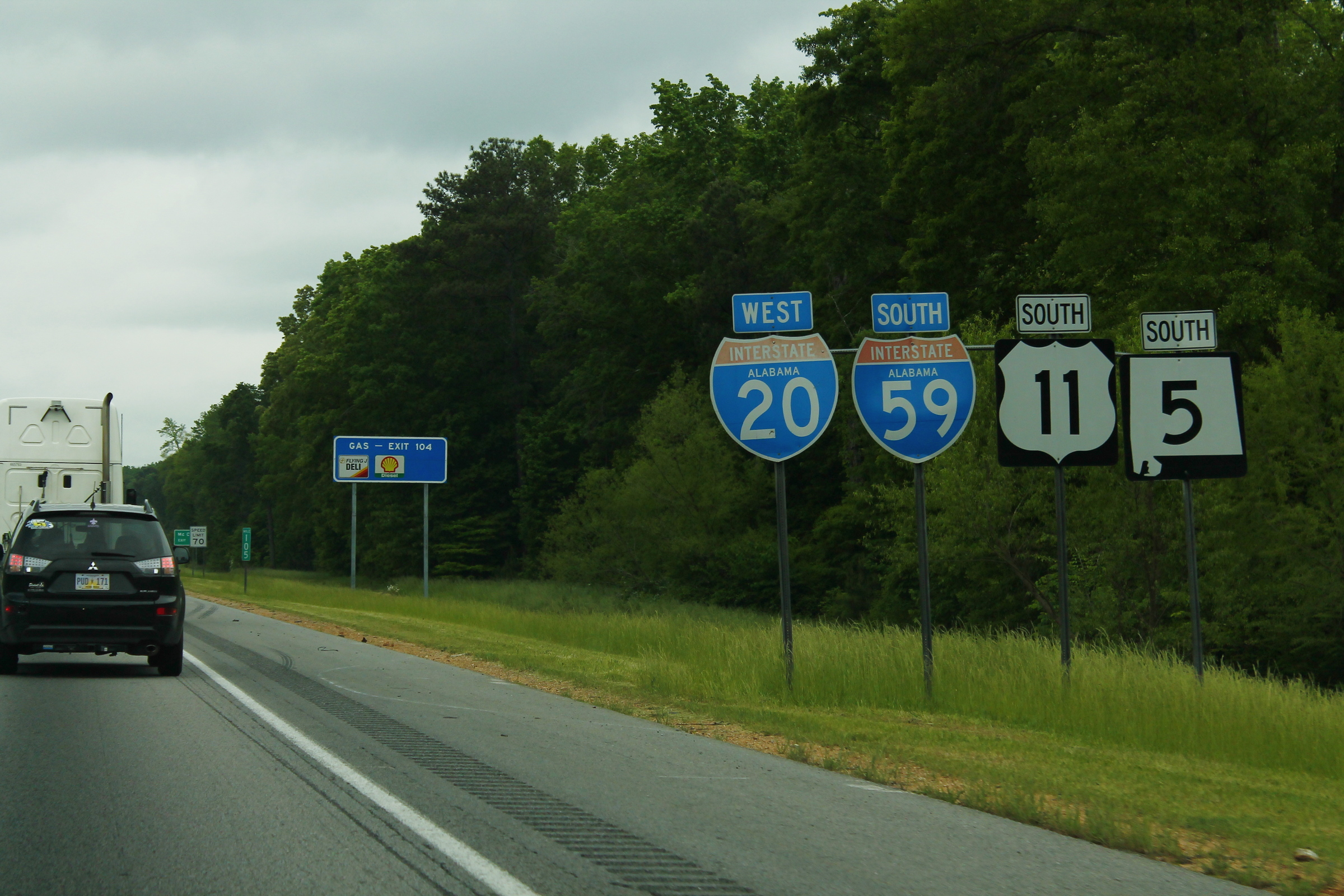
I-20 westbound/I-59/US 11/SR 5 southbound heading out of Birmingham

I-20/I-59 enters Sumter County, Alabama, from Lauderdale County, Mississippi, near the town of Cuba. Immediately upon entering the state, the highway approaches the welcome center for eastbound/northbound travelers and then reaches an interchange for indirect access to US 80. Continuing on through rural forest land, I-20/I-59 crosses the Toomsuba Creek with an interchange shortly after for SR 17 for York at milepost 8. The Interstates travel still in a northeast direction for another 9 miles (14 km) before crossing the Sucarnoochee River and meeting SR 28 for Livingston. It treks on for several more miles through wooded areas, crossing the Tombigbee River and entering Greene County. The highway passes by several marshes for a fair distance and approaches a rest area only accessible northbound, with the southbound rest area immediately following. The Interstate next has an interchange with SR 14 northwest of Eutaw, with an interchange for US 11/US 43 also serving the city. I-20/I-59 crosses the Buck Creek before entering Tuscaloosa County. Still within forested terrain, the Interstates meet with SR 300 and stay in a northeast direction while skirting more marshes before bridging the Black Warrior River. The highway turns almost entirely eastward and approaches the commercial developments of Tuscaloosa. Its first interchange is with SR 69 and I-359 for the University of Alabama at a partial cloverleaf interchange (parclo) and turns completely east to enter the city center. At milepost 73, I-20/I-59 meets US 82 (McFarland Boulevard) for downtown. It then has another interchange with US 11 (Skyland Boulevard) at a single-point urban interchange.

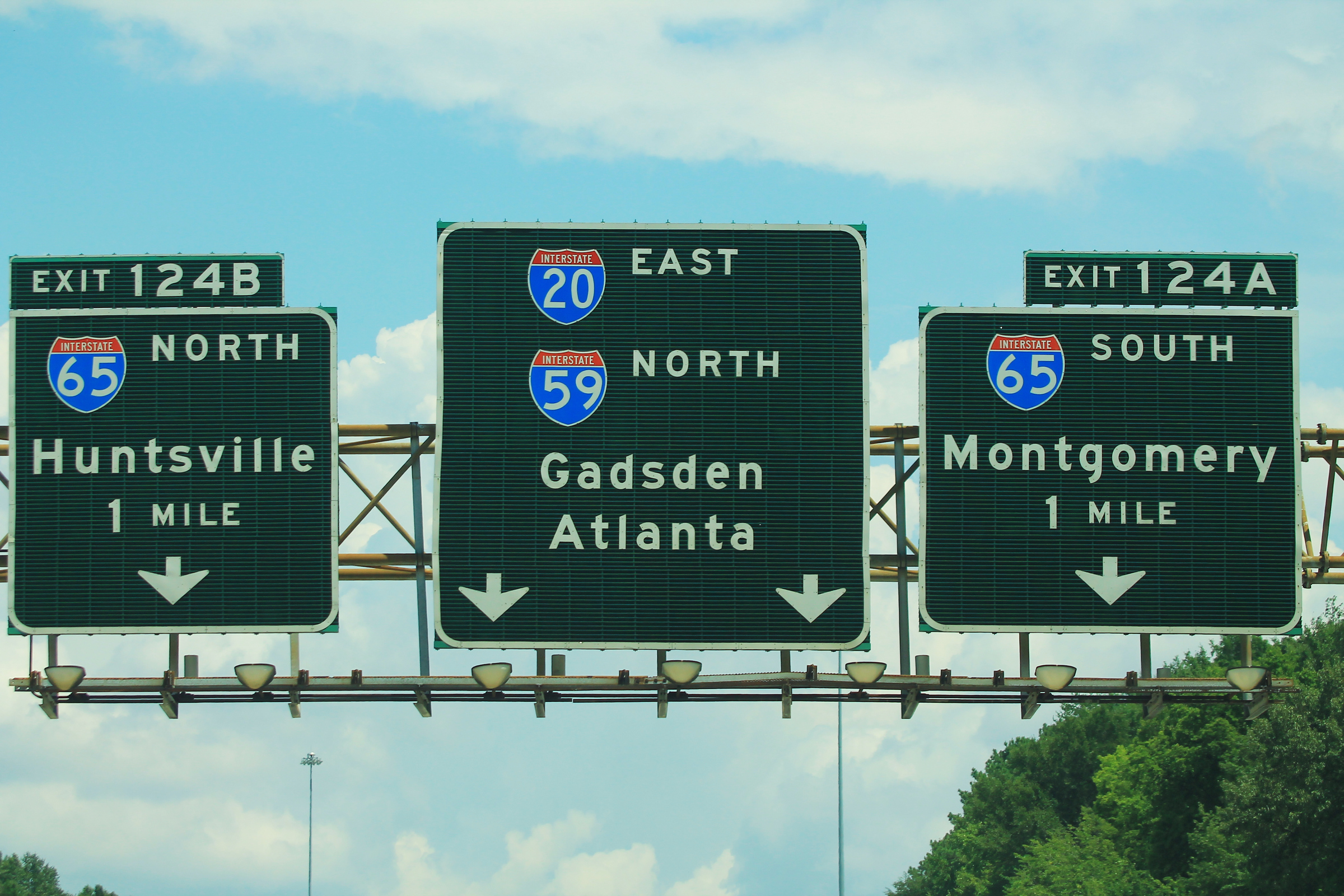
I-20 eastbound/I-59 northbound approaching the I-65 interchange near Birmingham

The surroundings return to wilderness as I-20/I-59 continues eastward and meets US 11 again at a parclo interchange at milepost 79 for Cottondale. Shortly thereafter, the highway approaches a rest area accessible in both directions, then continues through some industrial development with a Daimler Truck North America station to the north of it. Immediately, I-20/I-59 slants northeast and crosses the Hurricane Creek. It then skirts around the shoreline of Gallant Lake as it intersects US 11/SR 5. This time, however, US 11 and SR 5 begin a concurrency with the Interstate Highways as they slant northeast from a north direction yet again. The highway turns even more northeast to intersect with SR 216 as it enters forested land again and cuts into Jefferson County. From here, I-20/I-59/US 11/SR 5 continues in a northeastward track before meeting the southern terminus of I-459 in Bessemer at a trumpet interchange, with I-459 branching east to serve the southern suburbs of Birmingham. Two miles (3.2 km) later, US 11/SR 5 splits off at Academy Drive to serve downtown Bessemer as I-20/I-59 maintains its northeastward track whilst bypassing Bessemer in the process. The highway turns slightly and then more northward to bridge the Valley Creek as it passes along the west side of Bessemer. Turning back northeast and then entirely east, I-20/I-59 enters the developments of Birmingham and passes some of the city's neighborhoods such as Ensley, Belview Heights, and Central Park. It then turns fully eastward and meets US 78 (Arkadelphia Road) at milepost 123. Reaching milepost 124, I-20/I-59 meets I-65 at a large braided interchange. This stretch is most commonly referred to as "Malfunction Junction". Past this interchange, the road turns southeast for a view of the Birmingham skyline before the road angles northeast for another large interchange with US 31 and the western terminus of US 280 (Elton B. Stephens Expressway), which serves the downtown area and the southern suburbs. After exiting downtown but still heading through urbanized development, I-20/I-59 intersects SR 79 (Tallapoosa Street) and then the highway turns southeast again for an interchange for the Birmingham–Shuttlesworth International Airport. After this interchange, I-59 ends its 130-mile (210 km) concurrency with I-20 at exit 130, which heads southeast for Atlanta.

=== Birmingham to Georgia ===
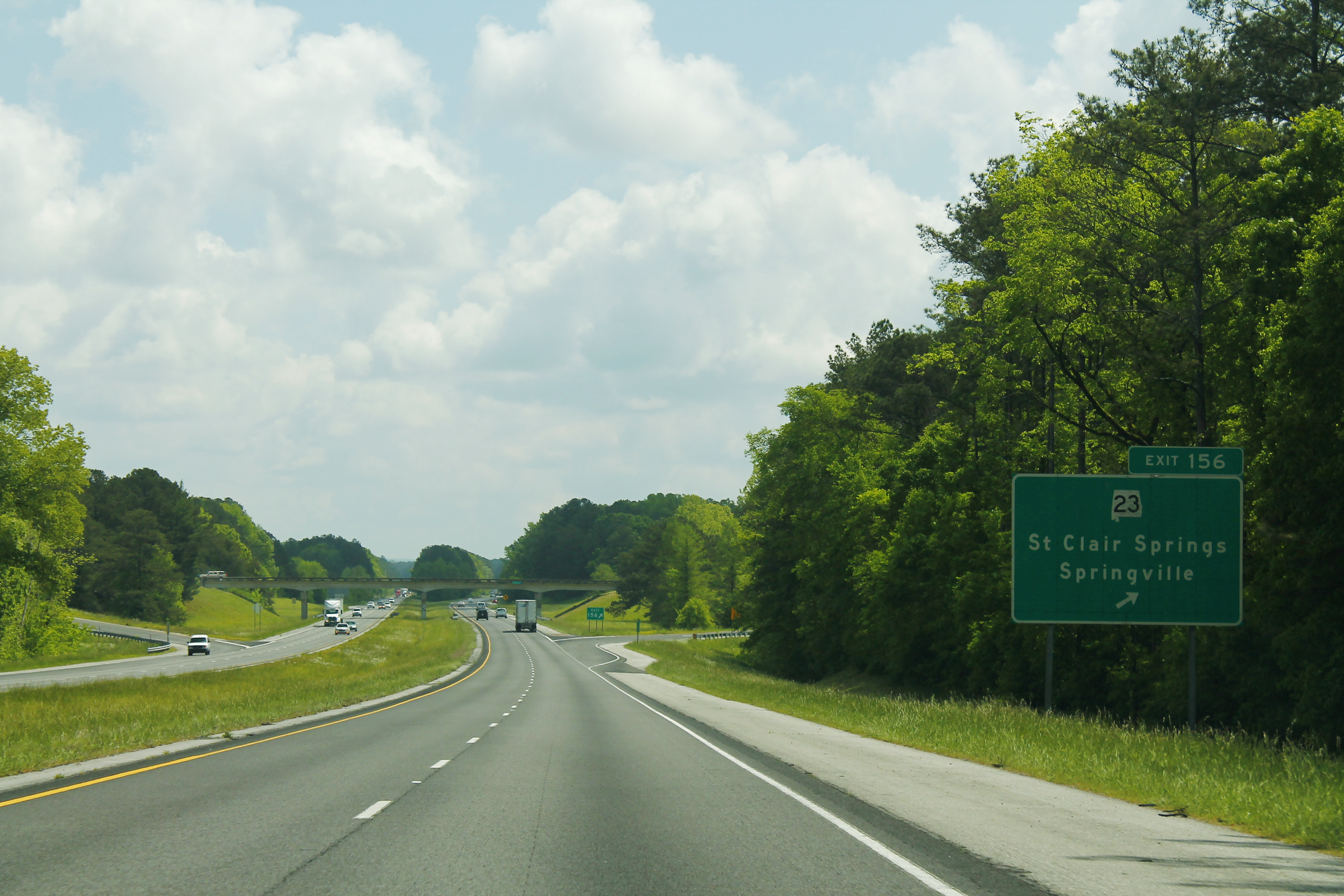
I-59 northbound at the SR 23 interchange

Having separated from I-20, I-59 stays on a generally northeastward track as it continues through the city's suburban developments. Its next three interchanges are all northbound-only, as it has another interchange with US 11 (1st Avenue) and turns east. The Interstate has an indirect connection with SR 75 as it gently ascends a steep incline and enters the Cahaba River watershed whilst passing over US 11 (Gadsden Highway) without directly intersecting it. Next, I-59 turns back to the northeast and meets the northern terminus of I-459 near Trussville as it leaves the developments of Birmingham and enters forested land again. It continues through the forest for four miles (6.4 km) and reaches the main exit for Trussville while bypassing Grayson Valley and Chalkville to the southeast. Turning back east again, I-59 bridges the Cahaba River and quickly slants northeast as it has another interchange with indirect access to US 11 and then enters St. Clair County. The Interstate passes through more wooded areas before intersecting with SR 174 for Odenville while avoiding Springville to the southeast. It makes another turn to the east for an interchange with SR 23. Then I-59 makes another turn to the northeast again as it bridges a small stream and passes the shoreline of Pinedale Lake and near Pinedale Shores, before the northbound lanes reach a rest area. A brief distance later, I-59 reaches an intersection with US 231 for Ashville as the Interstate bypasses the city to the north. Continuing northeast, the surroundings of the Interstate remain rural, and the Interstate next bridges the Dry Creek before entering Etowah County. At milepost 181, I-59 meets SR 77 at a parclo interchange and approximately a mile later enters the city of Gadsden and intersects the western terminus of I-759 at a tri-stack interchange.

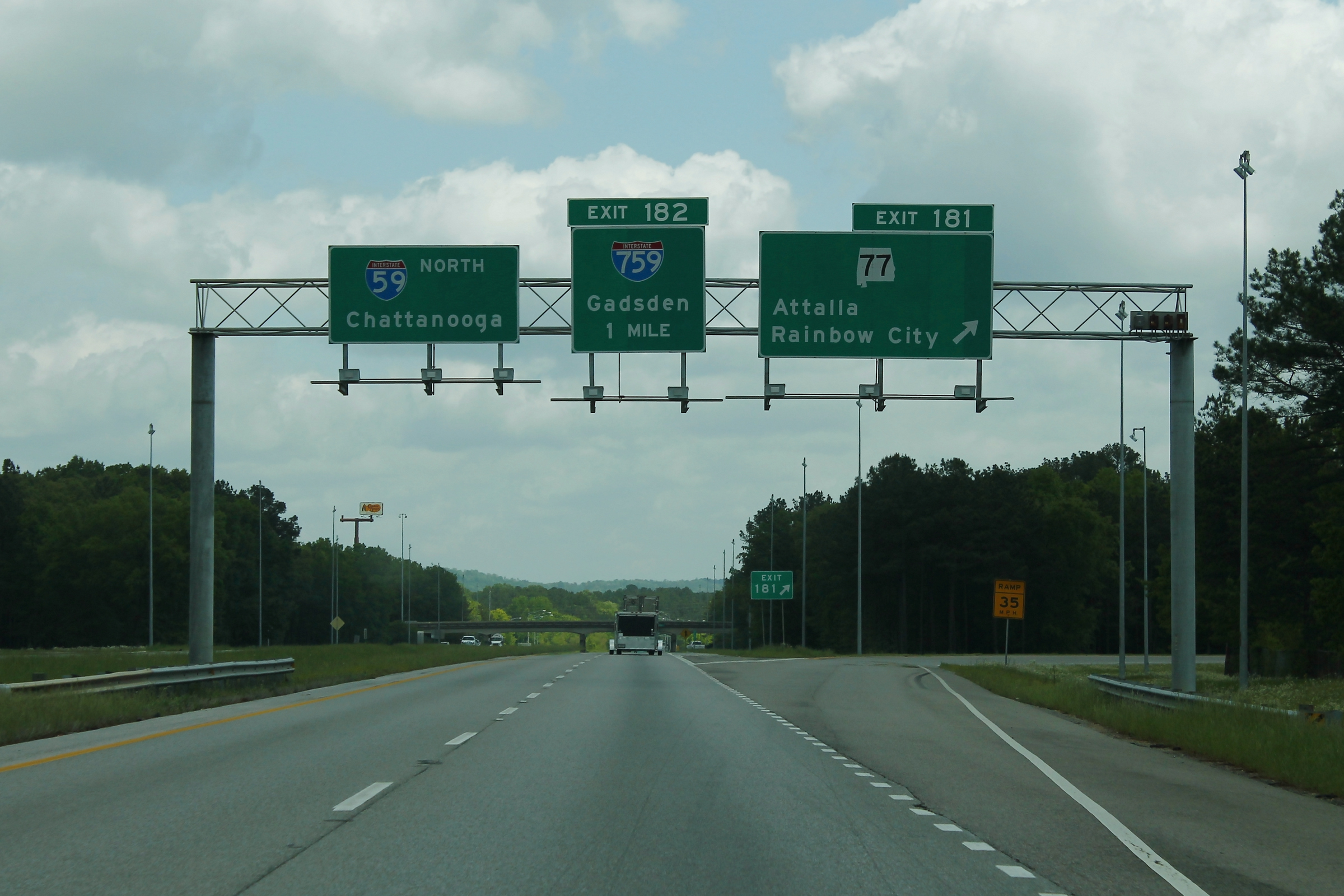
I-59 northbound meeting SR 77 in Gadsden

Shortly thereafter, I-59 crosses Big Wills Creek as it enters the city of Attalla and some suburban developments. It intersects US 278/US 431 (Fifth Avenue) for downtown and makes a turn to the northwest, then the northeast. As the Interstate skirts the foothills of the Appalachian Mountains, I-59 briefly parallels SR 211 for approximately five miles (8.0 km) before intersecting it at milepost 188. The Interstate stays in a northeast direction, then makes a gentle curve to the northwest again, where it continues to travel below the foothills of the mountains and crosses over US 11 indirectly for the second time. The Interstate makes a turn back to the northeast and parallels the Big Wills Creek for eight miles (13 km). During this time, it enters its final county in the state, DeKalb County. At milepost 205, it has an interchange with SR 68 for Collinsville. Bypassing Collinsville to the west, I-59 keeps its northeast trek and once again parallels Big Wills Creek. I-59 then approaches the commercial developments of Fort Payne as it reaches its next interchange with SR 35 for the downtown area and Pine Ridge. I-59 avoids Fort Payne to the west, and immediately after, parallels Isbell Field to the west. It then crosses a small stream before meeting with US 11 for the last time. I-59 makes a turn to the north and crosses the Big Wills Creek yet again as it reaches an interchange for indirect access to US 11. It crosses underneath the bridge carrying US 11 and makes another curve to the northeast. The Interstate travels through forested land for a few more miles before entering a small amount of development near the town of Hammondville and intersecting SR 40/SR 117 for the center of town. I-59 heads north and a bit northeast where it makes a very gentle descent along the foothills of the mountains. The final interchange it has is at milepost 239 at Sulphur Springs Road with indirect access to US 11, and the southbound lanes have an exit for the welcome center before I-59 exits Alabama into Dade County, Georgia.

== History ==
=== Planning and construction ===
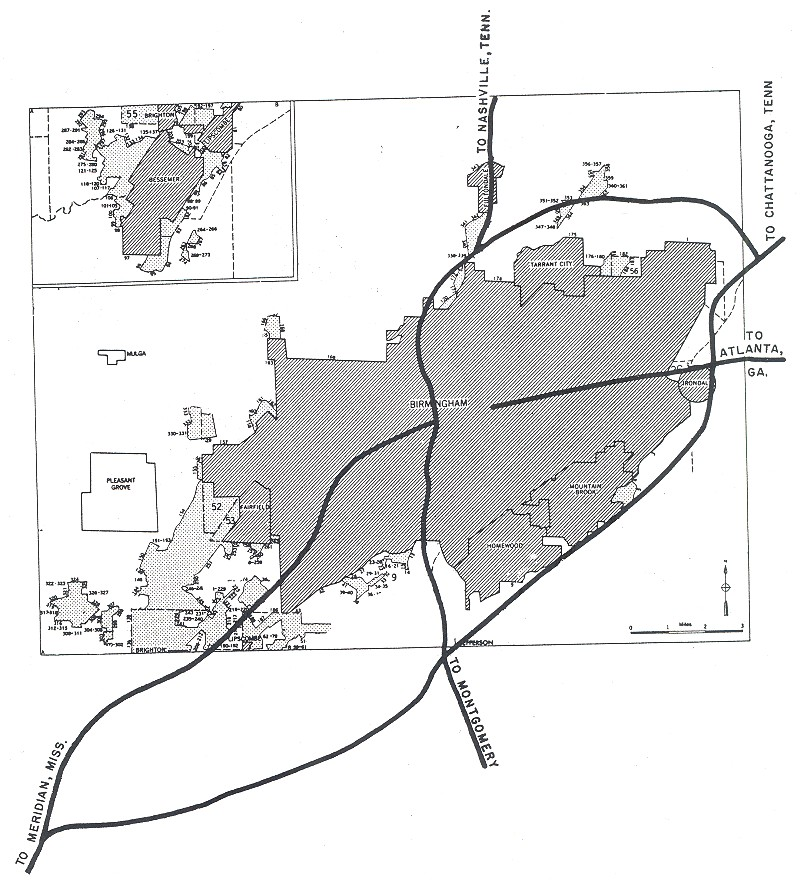
1955 Bureau of Public Roads freeway plan for Birmingham.

The general alignment for the freeway that would eventually become I-59 was included in the National Interregional Highway Committee's report from 1944, titled Interregional Highways, and the subsequent 1947 plan produced by the Public Roads Administration, which was part of the now-defunct Federal Works Agency. When I-59 was first established in the 1957 numbering plan designated by the American Association of State Highway and Transportation Officials, its proposed route generally followed its present alignment, which was to connect Chattanooga, Tennessee, with Meridian, Mississippi. Under the Federal-Aid Highway Act of 1956, this authorized federal funding for the construction of the Interstate Highway System, including the Alabama portion of I-59. The first section of I-59 began construction in 1959, which was the segment from Argo to St. Clair Springs. Other projects included grading and drainage from St. Clair Springs to Whitney, a distance of 9.362 miles (15.067 km). As a result, the planned routing of I-59 would run parallel to US 11, and the four-lane section of US 11 in Bessemer would be converted into an Interstate-standard freeway, later I-59. While I-59 was planned to go through the center of Birmingham, residents objected to it. As a result, the city proposed an alternate route for the Interstate Highway to travel north of the Birmingham airport instead of directly through the city, which would provide a faster, wider way to Gadsden and points north of it.

Contracts were awarded for two projects on November 22, 1960, with both projects being in DeKalb County. The first project involved 10.1 miles (16.3 km) of base and concrete pavement from US 11 near downtown Fort Payne to Rodgers as part of the Birmingham-Chattanooga link. The other project, also in DeKalb County, had a length of approximately 6.546 miles (10.535 km) of base and concrete pavement from Rodgers Road to the Georgia state line, and was also part of the Birmingham-Chattanooga link. Two additional construction projects were undertaken in 1961: in Tuscaloosa County, I-59 required grading and drainage from Boyd Crossing to Union Church, a distance of 4.9 miles (7.9 km) and part of the Birmingham-Meridian link. In Etowah County, grading and drainage work were performed from US 11 to the DeKalb County line, a distance of 5.4 miles (8.7 km). Lastly, also in DeKalb County, work included 0.087 miles (0.140 km) of bridges from the Etowah County line to SR 68.

From May 20 to May 26, 1962, in observance of National Highway Week, the Alabama Department of Transportation (ALDOT), then known as the State Highway Department, scheduled an aerial press tour of I-59 from Sulphur Springs to the Georgia state line. Construction of I-59 was moving along at a rapid pace due to warm spring weather. This construction continued in December, and according to a report released by governor John M. Patterson and highway director Sam Englehardt, the construction of the Interstate added up to 75% of DeKalb County's $10.4 million (Note: Equivalent to $84.6 million in 2025) program since January 1959. Some completed projects which were open to traffic during this time included approximately 22 miles (35 km) from Fort Payne to the Georgia state line, and a 7-mile (11 km) stretch of I-59 from the Etowah County line to Collinsville. The work in this section included one interchange, one creek bridge, as well as first stages of construction on the roadbed. By July 6, 1965, a "determined effort" to speed up construction of 2.9 miles (4.7 km) along I-59 in Ensley was scheduled to be put under contract, according to a State Highway Department official. Assistant Division Engineer Randolph Rowe announced that the project, which was estimated to cost over $5 million, (Note: Equivalent to $38.9 million in 2025) would be the largest contract along an Interstate to date in Jefferson County. With this in the plan, Rowe also said that paving along two sections of I-59 in the Western area was expected to begin in the same year, featuring a link with an approximate length of 1.6 miles (2.6 km) between Avenue V and Arkadelphia Road, another 1.6-mile (2.6 km) section from Avenue I to Avenue V, and a link with an approximate length of 1/2 mile (0.80 km) with a link of Arkadelphia Road over US 78.

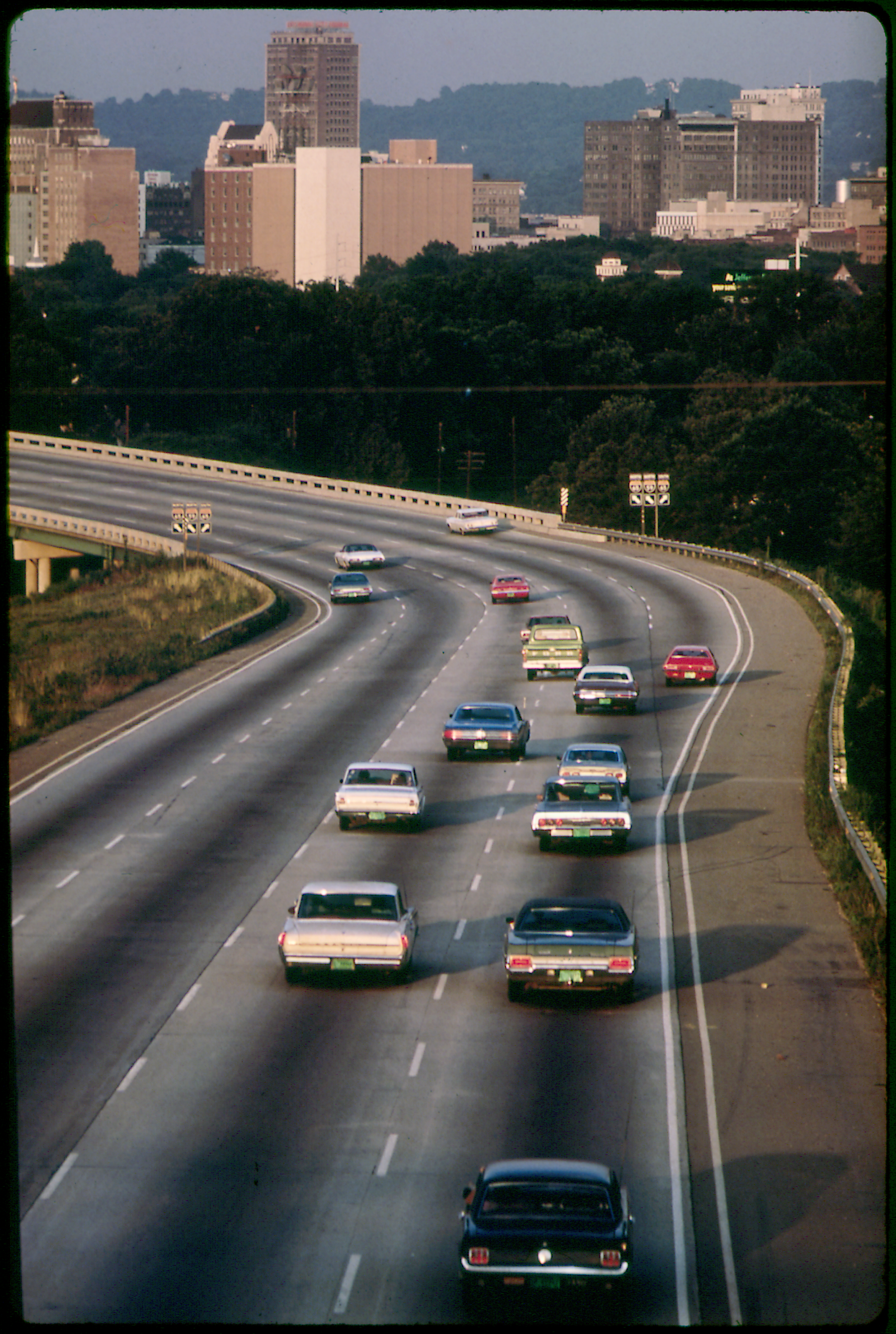
I-59 in 1972, with the Birmingham skyline in the background

On August 19, 1966, the State Highway Department accepted bids on three Birmingham projects, one of which included a multi-million-dollar section of the Interstate in the western portion of the city. This link would run 3.2 miles (5.1 km) from Avenue I to the TCI Highline Railroad west of Fairfield and would connect with another 3.6 miles (5.8 km) under construction as well eastward to Arkadelphia Road. By 1967, with over 432 miles (695 km) complete in the state, I-59 was the longest stretch of completed highway in the state, from Leeds to the Georgia state line. This stretch of the Interstate was a length of 94 miles (151 km) and connected Birmingham to Chattanooga. I-59 had the most completed mileage among all Interstate Highways in Alabama, with the large interchange with I-65 projected to be complete by at least 1969. The segment of the Interstate between Meridian, Mississippi, to Birmingham was slated for completion in 1971. Because most of the route traveled through rural areas in the western part of the state, this presented fewer problems for builders compared to urban areas. On June 7, 1970, a segment of I-59 in Birmingham was graded, drained, paved, and several new bridges were added, while work continued on completing I-59 between the US 82 bypass in Tuscaloosa and near Bessemer. Additionally, in Tuscaloosa, another project required repairing slide areas along the Interstate.

Paving contracts for I-59 were let on October 21, 1971. These contracts were the first bidding for highway projects since George Wallace took office as governor. The projects included Greene and Tuscaloosa counties between Knoxville and the Warrior River and from the Tombigbee River to Lizzieville for paving, grading, draining, and adding new bridges. On August 7, 1972, a stretch of I-59 reopened to traffic after the pavement in this stretch collapsed in the southbound direction, with a distance of two miles (3.2 km) from Collinsville to Reece City. This was due to heavy rains in March washing out the stretch, weakening the road and causing it to fail. Because of this, southbound traffic was temporarily redirected along the northbound lanes. As the Interstate Highway was constructed along a mountainside, southbound traffic would have to be wary of a steep drop along the side of the road. The opening of a section of I-59 in Tuscaloosa from US 82 (McFarland Boulevard) to SR 69 commenced on October 19, 1973, announced by George Wallace. On June 28, 1974, a nine-mile (14 km) stretch connecting Tuscaloosa and Fosters opened to traffic. Wallace announced that this stretch of I-59 would give the state as a whole 713 miles (1,147 km) of Interstate Highways. In 1975, bids totaling $24 million (Note: Equivalent to $111 million in 2025) were received by the State Highway Department, with $12 million (Note: Equivalent to $55.7 million in 2025) on I-59 in Bessemer. On June 2, 1980, the final four miles (6.4 km) of I-59 in Alabama opened to traffic following a ribbon-cutting ceremony, completing the 241-mile (388 km) route across the state.

=== Later history ===
==== "Malfunction Junction" ====
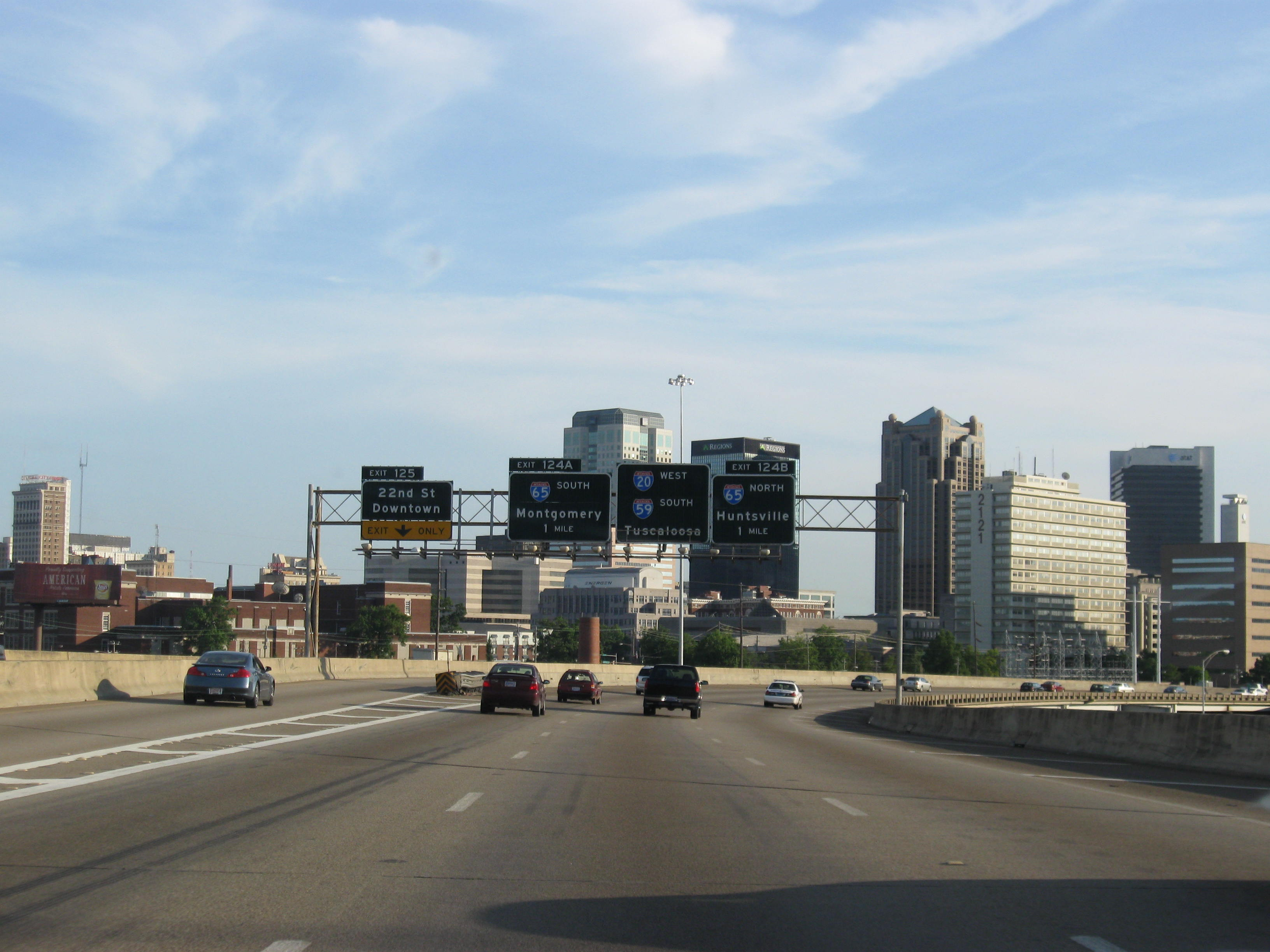
Approaching Malfunction Junction on I-20 westbound/I-59 southbound

The interchange of I-20/I-59 and I-65 in Birmingham, commonly referred to by residents and travelers as "Malfunction Junction", had seen repeated demands for reconstruction. The interchange required drivers to shift multiple lanes across the interchange. Also, because of numerous tight turns and sharp curves, it did not meet Interstate Highway standards. The design problems led to a large number of lane changing errors and vehicle accidents, massive congestion, and long delays. The interchange was originally designed to carry approximately 80,000 vehicles a day, but as of 2018 carried double that number, up to 160,000 per day. As it aged, the interchange started showing signs of deterioration and required repeated repairs to bridge rails and decks. Originally, ALDOT proposed several options in order to remedy traffic, such as placing I-20/I-59 on a separate 2.5-mile (4.0 km) corridor to intersect I-65 at a different interchange, but that solution would have required construction of a 16-lane Interstate through Birmingham neighborhoods. After several failed proposals, ALDOT finally decided to rebuild the interchange altogether in three phases. Phase 1 involved bridge and roadway improvements along I-65. Phase 2 comprised bridge additions and repairs, grading, draining, pavement, striping, and lighting. Phase 3 replaced the Central District Bridges (CBD) with segmental bridges for a cost of approximately $475 million. In 2018, I-20/I-59 was closed for 14 months in order to completely reconstruct the interchange with new vertical columns replacing the old elevated portions that traveled through the city's main district. The bridge closures were started on January 31, 2019, and around mid-January 2020, the new interchange was completed and opened to traffic.

The junction was also notable for repeated instances of trucks destroying the overpasses to the Interstates. On January 5, 2002, a tanker truck carrying over 9,900 US gallons (37,000 L) of gasoline smashed the bridge to I-65 southbound. A car swerved in front of it to avoid missing its exit, resulting in the truck swerving away to avoid rear-ending the car and hitting the bridge head-on. The truck exploded in a fireball, which was estimated to reach temperatures of at least 2,000 °F (1,090 °C). The heat caused the girders to sag up to 10 feet (3.0 m) on one side. Although only the tanker truck driver was killed, 140,000 vehicles were cut off from access to the interchange and ALDOT was forced to close the bridge for 37 days to make repairs. In October 2004, less than three years later, another fuel tanker sped through a tight curve and crashed, resulting in a spill of 9,000 US gallons (34,000 L) of fuel, which caught fire. Ideas proposed in December 2004 to reduce accidents at the interchange included flashing lights on all Interstate ramps, cameras to detect speeders and unstable truckers, and a law requiring truckers to secure their loads. With federal aid, warning lights that flash when vehicles drive through ramps going too fast were to be installed in approximately two or four months.

==== Trussville reconstruction ====
A project designed to reconstruct and expand a four-mile (6.4 km) segment of I-59 from the I-459 interchange in northern Birmingham to Chalkville Mountain Road in Trussville was announced in 2022. On October 17, 2024, the project was started in order to address issues that occur with the roadway's aging and deterioration. ALDOT announced that the project would help bring I-59 to modern standards and help increase traffic capacity. The project involves completely removing and replacing the existing pavement, with both directions being adjusted to add an extra lane, resulting in the Interstate expanding from four lanes to six. The lanes will measure 12 feet (3.7 m) in width and contain 12-foot (3.7 m) shoulders. The construction is expected to take just under two years, and has an estimated cost of approximately $70 million. The lanes are projected to be completed in 2026, with two lanes available to use during the day, and one during the night.

== Exit list ==
| County | Location | mi | km | Exit | Destinations | Notes |
|---|---|---|---|---|---|---|
| Sumter | | 0.0 | 0.0 | | I-20 west / I-59 south – Meridian | Continuation into Mississippi |
| Sumter | Cuba | 0.804 | 1.294 | 1 | To US 80 east (SR 8 east) – Cuba, Demopolis | |
| Sumter | | | | 3 | I-85 north – Montgomery | Proposed interchange; future southern terminus of I-85 |
| Sumter | York | 8.041 | 12.941 | 8 | SR 17 – York | |
| Sumter | Livingston | 17.059 | 27.454 | 17 | SR 28 – Livingston, Boyd | |
| Sumter | | 23.141 | 37.242 | 23 | CR 20 to SR 39 – Gainesville, Epes | |
| Greene | Boligee | 32.229 | 51.868 | 32 | CR 20 – Boligee, West Greene | |
| Greene | Eutaw | 40.766 | 65.607 | 40 | SR 14 – Aliceville, Eutaw | |
| Greene | | 45.334 | 72.958 | 45 | CR 208 – Union | |
| Greene | Knoxville | 52.244 | 84.079 | 52 | US 11 / US 43 (SR 7 / SR 13) – Knoxville | |
| Tuscaloosa | | 62.466 | 100.529 | 62 | SR 300 – Fosters | |
| Tuscaloosa | | 68.033 | 109.489 | 68 | Joe Mallisham Parkway | |
| Tuscaloosa | Tuscaloosa | 71.367 | 114.854 | 71 | I-359 / SR 69 (US 11 / SR 7) – Tuscaloosa, Moundville | Signed as exits 71A (SR 69 south) & 71B (I-359/SR 69 north); southern terminus of I-359; parclo interchange |
| Tuscaloosa | Tuscaloosa | 73.003 | 117.487 | 73 | US 82 / SR 6 (McFarland Boulevard) | Luther Stancel Pate III Memorial Bridge |
| Tuscaloosa | Tuscaloosa | 75.961 | 122.247 | 76 | US 11 / SR 7 (Skyland Boulevard) | |
| Tuscaloosa | Tuscaloosa | 77.102 | 124.084 | 77 | Buttermilk Road | Formerly signed for Cottondale |
| Tuscaloosa | Tuscaloosa | 79.895 | 128.579 | 79 | US 11 (SR 7) – Coaling, Cottondale | |
| Tuscaloosa | Tuscaloosa | 86.295 | 138.878 | 86 | Brookwood, Vance | |
| Tuscaloosa | Tuscaloosa | 89.253 | 143.639 | 89 | Mercedes Drive | |
| Tuscaloosa | | 97.138 | 156.328 | 97 | US 11 south / SR 5 south (SR 7 south) – West Blocton, Centreville | South end of US 11/SR 5 concurrency |
| Tuscaloosa | | 100.292 | 161.404 | 100 | SR 216 – Lake View | Eastern terminus of SR 216 |
| Jefferson | | 104.159 | 167.628 | 104 | Rock Mountain Lake Road | Access via McAshan Drive |
| Jefferson | McCalla | 106.201 | 170.914 | 106 | I-459 north – Gadsden, Atlanta, Montgomery Future I-422 north | Exits 0A-B on I-459 southbound; proposed interchange with I-422; southern terminus of I-459; future southern terminus of I-422; trumpet interchange for now |
| Jefferson | Bessemer | 108.396 | 174.446 | 108 | US 11 north / SR 5 north / SR 7 north (Academy Drive) | North end of US 11/SR 5 concurrency |
| Jefferson | Bessemer | 110.021 | 177.062 | 110 | Splash Adventure Parkway | |
| Jefferson | Bessemer | 112.341 | 180.795 | 112 | 18th Street / 19th Street | |
| Jefferson | Brighton | 113.280 | 182.306 | 113 | 18th Avenue – Brighton | |
| Jefferson | Midfield | 115.520 | 185.911 | 115 | Allison–Bonnett Memorial Drive / Jaybird Road | |
| Jefferson | Fairfield | 118.304 | 190.392 | 118 | Valley Road – Fairfield | |
| Jefferson | Fairfield | 119.025 | 191.552 | 119 | Lloyd Nolan Parkway | Signed as exit 119A southbound |
| Jefferson | Ensley | 119.727 | 192.682 | 119B | Avenue I | Southbound exit and northbound entrance |
| Jefferson | Ensley | 120.934 | 194.624 | 120 | SR 269 (20th Street Ensley) / Ensley Avenue | Southern terminus of SR 269 |
| Jefferson | Ensley | 121.238 | 195.114 | 121 | Bush Boulevard | Southbound exit and northbound entrance |
| Jefferson | Birmingham | 123.374 | 198.551 | 123 | US 78 / SR 4 (Arkadelphia Road) | |
| Jefferson | Birmingham | 124.740 | 200.750 | 124A | 6th Avenue North – Downtown | Eastbound exit only |
| Jefferson | Birmingham | 124.740 | 200.750 | 124B-C | I-65 – Montgomery, Huntsville | Signed as exits 124B (south) and 124C (north); I-65 exits 261B-C; hybrid interchange |
| Jefferson | Birmingham | 125.221 | 201.524 | 124D | 17th Street N. – Downtown | Eastbound exit and westbound entrance |
| Jefferson | Birmingham | 125.639 | 202.196 | 125B | 22nd Street – Downtown | Closed; was signed as exit 125 westbound |
| Jefferson | Birmingham | 126.239 | 203.162 | 126A | US 31 south / US 280 east (SR 3 south) Carraway Boulevard to US 31 north (SR 3 north) | Western terminus of US 280 |
| Jefferson | Birmingham | 126.825 | 204.105 | 126B | 31st Street N. / 25th Street N. – Birmingham–Jefferson Convention Complex | |
| Jefferson | Birmingham | 128.257 | 206.410 | 128 | SR 79 (Tallapoosa Street) | |
| Jefferson | Birmingham | 129.621 | 208.605 | 129 | Airport Boulevard | |
| Jefferson | Birmingham | 130.301 | 209.699 | 130 | I-20 east – Atlanta | North end of I-20 concurrency; I-20 exit 130A |
| Jefferson | Birmingham | 131.801 | 212.113 | 131 | Oporto–Madrid Boulevard | Northbound exit and southbound entrance |
| Jefferson | Birmingham | 132.214 | 212.778 | 132 | US 11 / SR 7 (1st Avenue North) | No access from I-59 north to US 11 south, from US 11 south to I-59 north, or from US 11 north to I-59 south |
| Jefferson | Birmingham | 133.814 | 215.353 | 133 | 4th Avenue South | Northbound exit and southbound entrance |
| Jefferson | Birmingham | 134.383 | 216.268 | 134 | To SR 75 (Roebuck Parkway) – Center Point | |
| Jefferson | Birmingham | 137.202 | 220.805 | 137 | I-459 south – Montgomery, Tuscaloosa, Atlanta | Northern terminus of I-459 |
| Jefferson | Trussville | 140.802 | 226.599 | 141 | Trussville, Pinson | |
| Jefferson | Trussville | 143.647 | 231.177 | 143 | Deerfoot Parkway / Mount Olive Church Road | |
| Jefferson | | | | 147 | I-422 south | Proposed interchange; future northern terminus of I-422 |
| Jefferson | | 147.647 | 237.615 | 148 | To US 11 (SR 7) – Argo | |
| St. Clair | | 153.911 | 247.696 | 154 | SR 174 – Odenville, Springville | |
| St. Clair | | 156.178 | 251.344 | 156 | SR 23 – St. Clair Springs, Springville | |
| St. Clair | Ashville | 166.322 | 267.669 | 166 | US 231 (SR 53) – Ashville, Oneonta | |
| St. Clair | Steele | 173.650 | 279.463 | 174 | Steele | |
| Etowah | Gadsden | 181.294 | 291.764 | 181 | SR 77 – Attalla, Rainbow City | |
| Etowah | Gadsden–Attalla line | 182.058 | 292.994 | 182 | I-759 east – Gadsden | Western terminus of I-759 |
| Etowah | Attalla | 183.030 | 294.558 | 183 | US 278 / US 431 (SR 74 / SR 1) – Attalla, Gadsden | |
| Etowah | Reece City–Gadsden line | 188.082 | 302.689 | 188 | SR 211 to US 11 (SR 7) – Gadsden, Reece City | |
| DeKalb | Collinsville | 205.148 | 330.154 | 205 | SR 68 – Collinsville, Crossville | |
| DeKalb | Fort Payne | 218.654 | 351.890 | 218 | SR 35 – Fort Payne, Rainsville | |
| DeKalb | Fort Payne | 222.152 | 357.519 | 222 | US 11 (SR 7) – Fort Payne | |
| DeKalb | Fort Payne | 224.100 | 360.654 | 224 | 49th Street NW | |
| DeKalb | Hammondville | 231.419 | 372.433 | 231 | SR 40 / SR 117 – Valley Head, Hammondville | |
| DeKalb | | 239.642 | 385.666 | 239 | To US 11 (SR 7) / Sulphur Springs Road | |
| DeKalb | | 239.91 | 386.10 | | I-59 north – Chattanooga | Continuation into Georgia |
1.000 mi = 1.609 km; 1.000 km = 0.621 mi: Closed/former; Concurrency terminus; Incomplete access; Unopened

== Auxiliary routes ==
There are three auxiliary routes for I-59 in the state. I-359 is a spur of I-59 that leads into downtown Tuscaloosa and to the University of Alabama. I-459 is a loop of I-59 that serves as a bypass around downtown Birmingham and connects to I-59 at Bessemer and Trussville. I-759 is a spur route of I-59 connecting Attalla to downtown Gadsden.
