= U.S. Route 11 in Alabama =

Segment of American highway

U.S. Route 11

Route information
- Maintained by ALDOT
- Length: 250.671 mi (403.416 km)
- Existed: 1926–present

Major junctions
- South end: US 11 / US 80 at the Mississippi state line near Cuba
- US 80 in Cuba; US 43 / SR 14 in Eutaw; I-20 / I-59 at multiple locations; US 82 in Tuscaloosa; I-459 near McCalla; US 78 / SR 5 in Birmingham; I-65 in Birmingham; I-459 in Birmingham; US 231 at Ashville; US 278 / US 431 in Attalla
- North end: US 11 / SR 58 at Georgia state line near Sulphur Springs

Location
- Country: United States
- State: Alabama
- Counties: Sumter, Greene, Tuscaloosa, Bibb, Jefferson, St. Clair, Etowah, DeKalb

Highway system
- United States Numbered Highway System; List; Special; Divided; Alabama State Highway System; Interstate; US; State
← SR 10	→ SR 12
← SR 6	SR 7	→ SR 8

U.S. Route 11 (US 11) runs southwest to northeast across northcentral Alabama for 250.671 miles (403.416 km). It enters the state from Mississippi concurrent with US 80 and exits into Georgia east of Sulphur Springs. US 11 runs through the major cities of Tuscaloosa and Birmingham, as well as the smaller cities and towns of Cuba, York, Livingston, Epes, Boligee, Eutaw, Cottondale, Coaling, Woodstock, Bessemer, Brighton, Midfield, Trussville, Argo, Springville, Ashville, Steele, Attalla, Reece City, and Collinsville. State Route 7 (SR 7) is designated along the entire route but unsigned.

Aside from portions within major cities and towns, US 11 is largely a rural two-lane road. The route has been largely supplanted by Interstate 59 (I-59), as well as I-20 between Mississippi and Birmingham.

== Route description ==
=== Mississippi state line to Tuscaloosa ===
Starting at the Mississippi state line, US 11, along with US 80, travel northeast toward Cuba. In this location, US 80 turns eastward onto a four-lane divided highway. Continuing on US 11, it intersects SR 17 in York, SR 28 in Livingston (where the University of West Alabama is located), and SR 39 near Epes. After traversing through Epes, US 11 crosses above the Tombigbee River south of Fort Tombecbe, part of the Tennessee–Tombigbee Waterway.

Going further, US 11 traverses through Boligee and then through Eutaw. In Eutaw, the route intersects two different routes at the Greene County Courthouse Square District: US 43 and SR 14. While SR 14 briefly runs concurrently with US 11, US 43 runs concurrently with it longer. After leaving Eutaw, both U.S. Highways stumble across I-20/I-59 in Knoxville. From there, both routes travel on a local road serving Ralph and Fosters. After crossing above the Black Warrior River, the road approaches Tuscaloosa. Along the way, they intersect Joe Mallisham Parkway. In downtown, they come across Stillman College. After that, US 43 branches north along SR 69 while US 11 travels south along I-359/SR 69.

=== Tuscaloosa to Downtown Birmingham ===
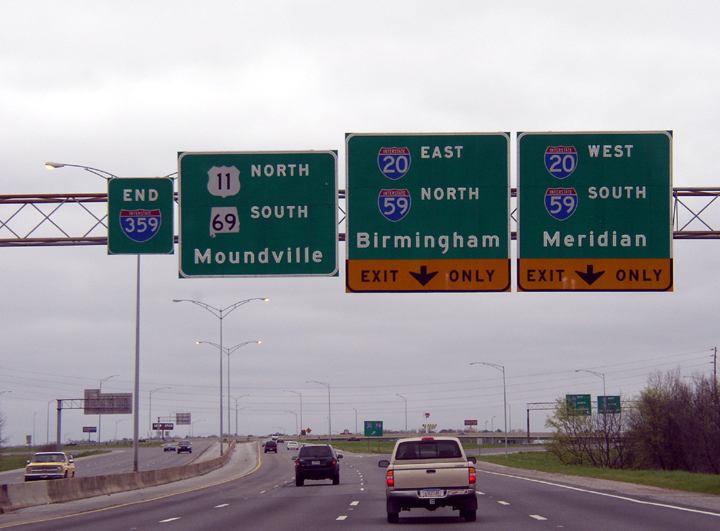
US 11 running concurrently with I-359/SR 69 as they approach I-20/I-59

As the three routes meet I-20/I-59, I-359 ends while the rest continues as a local road. Shortly after US 11 leaves the freeway, it then turns east along Skyland Boulevard. Along the way, the route meets SR 215, US 82, and I-20/I-59. As the route leaves Tuscaloosa, it intersects SR 215 in Cottondale for the second time. The route then meets the same interstate freeway for the fourth time that it parallels. It then passes through Coaling, Vance, and Woodstock. In Woodstock, it begins to run concurrently with SR 5. After that, both routes then travel along the I-20/I-59 freeway. East of Lake View, four of the routes on the freeway then meet SR 316. After that, the freeway then comes across I-459 near McCalla.

Shortly after I-459, US 11, as well as SR 5, leave the freeway and then onto 9th Avenue Southwest. They then go through several suburbs of Birmingham. As they approach downtown, SR 5 turned northwest onto US 78 while US 11 continues east along US 78. After that, the road becomes a short one-way pair and then comes across I-65. Then, US 78 branches east while US 11 continues northeast. Shortly thereafter, the route meets US 31/US 280.

=== Downtown Birmingham to the Georgia state line ===
At this point, US 11 runs through industries and railroads in Birmingham. It then comes across Messer Airport Highway, a local road that connects to Birmingham–Shuttlesworth International Airport. After meeting I-20 for the last time, US 11 no longer parallels I-20. The route then meets I-59, SR 75, I-459, several more state routes, and US 231 in several locations. It then meets US 278/US 431 near Gadsden. After that, it continues to meet even more state routes, as well as I-59, along the rest of the route. It eventually crosses the Georgia state line.

== History ==
Between the Mississippi state line and Birmingham, US 11 roughly follows a route surveyed by pathfinders in 1912.

== Future ==
In 2024, ALDOT will began work to convert the US 11 (Skyland Boulevard)/SR 69 intersection into a single-point urban interchange (SPUI) in order to improve traffic flow. The project, which is a joint effort between the Tuscaloosa Road Improvement Commission and ALDOT, is expected to cost $89 million and take about three years to complete.

== Major intersections ==
County	Location	mi	km	Destinations	Notes
Sumter		0.000	0.000	US 11 south / US 80 west – Meridian	Continuation into Mississippi
Sumter	Cuba	3.012	4.847	US 80 east (SR 8 east) / SR 8 west / I-20 / I-59 – Demopolis	Eastern end of US 80 overlap
Sumter	York	7.980	12.843	SR 17 (Broad Street) to I-20 / I-59 – Butler, Geiger	
Sumter	Livingston	15.964	25.692	CR 13 (Bennett Road)	
Sumter	Livingston	17.485	28.139	SR 28 east (North Street) – Demopolis	Southern end of SR 28 overlap
Sumter	Livingston	19.548	31.459	SR 28 west to I-20 / I-59 / North Industrial Park Road – Emelle	Northern end of SR 28 overlap
Sumter		23.342	37.565	SR 39 north – Gainesville	Southern terminus of SR 39
Greene	Eutaw	44.165– 44.218	71.077– 71.162	US 43 south (SR 13 south) / SR 14 (Boligee Street / Tuscaloosa Street)	Southern end of US 43/SR 13 overlap
Greene	Knoxville	56.897	91.567	I-20 / I-59 – Tuscaloosa, Meridian	I-20/I-59 exit 52
Tuscaloosa	Fosters	66.923	107.702	CR 10 (SR 300 south / Gainesville Road / Holley Springs Lane) to I-20 / I-59	Northern terminus of SR 300
Tuscaloosa	Tuscaloosa	74.286	119.552	CR 16 (Joe Mallisham Parkway) to I-59 / US 82 west / US 43 north / SR 69 north	
Tuscaloosa	Tuscaloosa	77.559	124.819	US 43 north (SR 13 north / Lurleen B. Wallace Boulevard North) / I-359 north / SR 69 north / 15th Street – Northport	Northern end of US 43 overlap; southern end of I-359/SR 69 overlap; northern terminus of I-359; Northpoint signed southbound only
Tuscaloosa	Tuscaloosa	78.9	127.0	35th Street / Kauloosa Avenue	Interchange
Tuscaloosa	Tuscaloosa	79.765	128.369	I-20 / I-59 – Meridian, Birmingham	Interchange; I-20/I-59 exit 71A-B
Tuscaloosa	Tuscaloosa	80.152	128.992	I-359 south / SR 69 / Oscar Baxter Drive – Moundville	Northern end of SR 69/I-359 overlap; southern terminus of I-359
Tuscaloosa	Tuscaloosa	80.431	129.441	SR 215 (Old Montgomery Highway / Greensboro Avenue) – Montgomery	Montgomery signed eastbound only
Tuscaloosa	Tuscaloosa	81.572	131.277	US 82 (SR 6 / McFarland Boulevard East) to I-59 – Montgomery, Columbus	To I-59 signed eastbound only
Tuscaloosa	Tuscaloosa	86.070	138.516	I-20 / I-59 – Birmingham, Meridian	I-20/I-59 exit 76; cities signed westbound only
Tuscaloosa	Cottondale	86.070	138.516	SR 215 south (University Boulevard East) – Tuscaloosa	Northern terminus of SR 215
Tuscaloosa		89.464	143.978	I-20 / I-59	I-20/I-59 exit 79
Bibb	Woodstock	105.008	168.994	SR 5 south – West Blocton	Southern end of SR 5 overlap
Tuscaloosa		108.080	173.938	I-20 west / I-59 south / Shamblin Woods Road	Southern end of I-20/I-59 overlap; I-20/I-59 exit 97
Tuscaloosa		111.234	179.014	Abernant, Bucksville (SR 216)	Interchange; I-20/I-59 exit 100
Jefferson	Bessemer			Rock Mountain Lake (McAshan Drive)	Interchange; I-20/I-59 exit 104
Jefferson	Bessemer	117.143	188.523	I-459 north – Gadsden, Atlanta	Interchange; I-20/I-59 exit 106; I-459 exits 0A-B westbound.
Jefferson	Bessemer	119.338	192.056	I-20 east / I-59 north – Birmingham	Northern end of I-20/I-59 overlap; I-20/I-59 exit 108
Jefferson	Bessemer	122.758	197.560	SR 150 east (14th Street) – Hoover	Western terminus of SR 150
Jefferson	Birmingham	132.934	213.937	US 78 west / SR 5 north (Princeton Parkway) / Princeton Parkway	Northern end of SR 5 overlap; southern end of US 78 overlap
Jefferson	Birmingham	134.540	216.521	Southwestern end of one-way segment	
Jefferson	Birmingham	134.666	216.724	I-65 south / 10th Street North / 11th Street North – Montgomery	Access only from US 11 north to I-65 south and from I-65 north to US 11 north; I-65 exit 260B
Jefferson	Birmingham	135.027	217.305	Northeastern end of one-way segment	
Jefferson	Birmingham	136.037	218.930	US 78 east (24th Street North) / 24th Street North	Northern end of US 78 overlap
Jefferson	Birmingham	139.858	225.080	I-20 west – Tuscaloosa	No direct access from US 11 to I-20 east and from I-20 west to US 11; I-20 exits 130A-B eastbound.
Jefferson	Birmingham	141.659	227.978	I-59	No direct access from US 11 north to I-59 south; from US 11 south to I-59 north; from I-59 north to US 11 south
Jefferson	Birmingham	143.925	231.625	SR 75 (Roebuck Parkway) to I-59 – Center Point	
Jefferson	Birmingham	147.016	236.599	I-459 to I-59 / Edwards Lake Road – Montgomery, Gadsden, Birmingham	I-459 exit 32
St. Clair	Springville	163.500	263.128	SR 174 east (Marietta Road) / CR 9 west (Murphrees Valley Road) to I-59 – Odenville, Oneonta	Western terminus of SR 174
St. Clair	Springville	166.208	267.486	SR 23 north to I-59 – Ashville	Southern terminus of SR 23
St. Clair	Ashville	176.344	283.798	US 231 (SR 53) to I-59 – Ashville, Oneonta	
Etowah	Attalla	190.492	306.567	SR 77 (Gilbert Ferry Road) to I-59 – Lincoln, Rainbow City	
Etowah	Attalla	192.066	309.100	US 278 west (Morgan Drive NW) / US 431 north	Southern end of US 278/US 431 overlap
Etowah	Attalla	192.399	309.636	US 278 east (Fifth Avenue NW) / US 431 south to I-59 / Fifth Avenue NW	Northern end of US 278/US 431 overlap
Etowah	Reece City	197.656	318.096	SR 211 south (Noccalula Parkway) to I-59 / Bruton Gap Road – Gadsden	Northern terminus of SR 211
DeKalb	Collinsville	213.200	343.112	SR 68 east – Leesburg	Southern end of SR 68 overlap
DeKalb	Collinsville	213.768	344.026	SR 68 west to I-59 / West Main Street – Crossville	Northern end of SR 68 overlap
DeKalb	Fort Payne	227.539	366.189	SR 35 north (Glenn Boulevard SW) to I-59	Southern end of SR 35 overlap
DeKalb	Fort Payne	228.593	367.885	SR 35 south (Fifth Street NE) / Fifth Street NW – DeSoto State Park, Little River Canyon, DeSoto Falls	Northern end of SR 35 overlap
DeKalb	Fort Payne	231.500	372.563	I-59 – Chattanooga, Gadsden	I-59 exit 222
DeKalb	Hammondville	240.287	386.704	SR 117 south / Lyons Road – Valley Head, Summerville, Mentone, DeSoto State Park	Southern end of SR 117 overlap; destinations signed southbound only
DeKalb	Hammondville	240.421	386.920	SR 117 north to SR 40 / I-59	Northern end of SR 117 overlap
DeKalb		250.671	403.416	US 11 north / SR 58 north	Continuation into Georgia
1.000 mi = 1.609 km; 1.000 km = 0.621 mi: Concurrency terminus

U.S. Route 11
Previous state: Mississippi	Alabama	Next state: Georgia
