= Alabama State Route 174 =

State highway in Alabama, United States

State Route 174

Route information
- Maintained by ALDOT
- Length: 19.607 mi (31.554 km)
- Existed: 1948–present

Major junctions
- West end: US 11 in Springville
- I-59 in Springville; US 411 in Odenville
- East end: US 231 north of Pell City

Location
- Country: United States
- State: Alabama
- Counties: St. Clair

Highway system
- Alabama State Highway System; Interstate; US; State
← SR 173	→ SR 175

State Route 174 (SR 174) is a 19.607-mile-long (31.554 km) route in St. Clair County in the north-central part of the state. The western terminus of the route is at a junction with US 11 at Springville. The eastern terminus of the route is at a junction with US 231 north of Pell City.

== Route description ==
SR 174 is aligned along a two-lane road for its entirety. It begins at Springville, heading in a southeastward direction. The route then passes through rural areas of St. Clair County en route to Odenville. At Odenville, the route junctions US 411 and begins a 1-mile (1.6 km) concurrency, turning to the southwest. SR 174 then diverts from US 411, briefly resuming its southward trajectory. North of Cook Springs, the route turns eastward, and continues its eastward orientation until it reaches its eastern terminus north of Pell City at US 231.

== Major intersections ==
The entire route is in St. Clair County.

Location	mi	km	Destinations	Notes
Springville	0.0	0.0	US 11 (Main Street/SR 7) – Trussville, Steele	Western terminus
Springville	0.638	1.027	I-59 – Birmingham, Gadsden	I-59 Exit 154
Odenville	8.443	13.588	US 411 north (SR 25) – Ashville	West end of concurrency with US 411
Odenville	9.446	15.202	US 411 south (SR 25) – Moody	East end of concurrency with US 411
	19.607	31.554	US 231 (SR 53) – Pell City, Ashville	Eastern terminus
1.000 mi = 1.609 km; 1.000 km = 0.621 mi: Concurrency terminus
