= Alabama State Route 216 =

State highway in Alabama, United States

State Route 216

Route information
- Maintained by ALDOT
- Length: 26.1 mi (42.0 km)
- Existed: 1978–present

Major junctions
- West end: SR 215 at Tuscaloosa
- East end: I-20 / I-59 / US 11 / SR 5 at Bucksville

Location
- Country: United States
- State: Alabama
- Counties: Tuscaloosa

Highway system
- Alabama State Highway System; Interstate; US; State
| ← SR 215 | → SR 217 |

State Route 216 (SR 216) is a numbered state highway in Tuscaloosa County, Alabama. SR 216 follows the former route of US 11 through eastern Tuscaloosa County. It serves as an alternate route between Bessemer and Tuscaloosa (the other routes being I-20/59 and US 11). The route was commissioned in April 1978 after ALDOT took over the route formerly maintained by Tuscaloosa County as County Road 116.

== Route description ==
SR 216 starts in eastern Tuscaloosa at University Boulevard (SR 215) and Veterans' Memorial Drive and ends just as it crosses over I-20/59 and US 11 and SR 5 in Bucksville, just short of the Tuscaloosa-Jefferson county line. Though it connects to the twinned interstates at Exit 100, no mentioned is made of the route on interstate signage. The road continues under county maintenance into Jefferson County.

The highway passes through the coal-mining country of eastern Tuscaloosa County. The largest towns on the highway are Brookwood and Lake View. The highway is mostly narrow and windy and is known for the high number of fatal accidents on the Brookwood-to-Tuscaloosa stretch.

== Major intersections ==
The entire route is in Tuscaloosa County.

| Location | mi | km | Destinations | Notes |
|---|---|---|---|---|
| Tuscaloosa | 0.0 | 0.0 | SR 215 (University Boulevard) | Western terminus. |
| Bucksville | 26.1 | 42.0 | I-20 / I-59 / US 11 / SR 5 (SR 7) – Birmingham, Tuscaloosa | I-20/59 exit 100; eastern terminus. |
1.000 mi = 1.609 km; 1.000 km = 0.621 mi
