= Alabama State Route 300 =

Highway in Alabama, United States

State Route 300

Route information
- Maintained by ALDOT
- Length: 0.780 mi (1,255 m)
- Existed: April 11, 2016–present

Major junctions
- West end: US 11 / US 43 at Fosters
- East end: I-20 / I-59 at Fosters

Location
- Country: United States
- State: Alabama
- Counties: Tuscaloosa

Highway system
- Alabama State Highway System; Interstate; US; State
← SR 297	→ SR 301

State Route 300 (SR 300) is a short road located entirely in Tuscaloosa County, Alabama, connecting Fosters with Interstate 20/Interstate 59 (I-20/I-59); the route is also known as County Route 10 or Holley Springs Road.

== Route description ==
The road begins in Fosters at the intersection of U.S. Route 11 (US 11), US 43, and County Road 10 and continues south completely surrounded by forest. The route ends right after the junction with I-20/I-59, after that there is a small dead end road.

== Major intersections ==
The entire route is in Fosters, Tuscaloosa County.

mi	km	Destinations	Notes
0.000	0.000	US 11 / US 43 / CR 10 (Gainesville Road) – Tuscaloosa, Eutaw, Meridian	Western terminus
0.665– 0.780	1.070– 1.255	I-20 / I-59 – Tuscaloosa, Meridian	Eastern terminus; I-20/59 exit 62
1.000 mi = 1.609 km; 1.000 km = 0.621 mi
