= Alabama State Route 11 =

There is no current State Route 11 in the U.S. state of Alabama.

- See U.S. Route 11 in Alabama for the current route numbered 11
- See Alabama State Route 11 (pre-1957) for the former SR 11
