= Alabama State Route 378 =

State highway in Alabama, United States

State Route 378
- Finley Boulevard
- SR 378 highlighted in red

Route information
- Maintained by ALDOT
- Length: 2.32 mi (3.73 km)
- Existed: 2016–present

Major junctions
- West end: US 78 / SR 5 in Birmingham
- I-65 in Birmingham
- East end: US 31 in Birmingham

Location
- Country: United States
- State: Alabama
- Counties: Jefferson

Highway system
- Alabama State Highway System; Interstate; US; State
← I-359	→ US 411

State Route 378 (SR 378) is an east–west route located entirely in the city of Birmingham in Jefferson County in north central Alabama. The route is 2.32 miles (3.73 km) long. It is known as Finley Boulevard for its entire length.

== Route description ==
SR 378 is part of the old alignment of U.S. Route 78 (US 78) along the entire length of Finley Boulevard in the East Thomas neighborhood. It begins at a junction with the new alignment of US 78 (Arkadelphia Road) on the west side, and it ends at a junction with U.S. Route 31 (US 31).

== History ==
The SR 378 designation was established in 2016 when US 78 was re-routed onto an alignment that carries US 78 from downtown Birmingham westward on Third Avenue North and Third Avenue West (concurrent with U.S. Route 11 (US 11), then north on Arkadelphia Road. Formerly, US 78 ran concurrently with US 31 north from downtown along Carraway Boulevard, then turned west onto Finley Boulevard, and then north again on Arkadeplhia Road. The SR 378 designation replaces US 78 on Finley Boulevard.

== Major Intersections ==
The entire route is in Birmingham, Jefferson County.

mi	km	Destinations	Notes
0.00	0.00	US 78 / SR 5 (SR 4/Arkadelphia Road)	Western terminus
1.60– 1.70	2.57– 2.74	I-65 – Huntsville, Montgomery	I-65 exit 262B
2.32	3.73	US 31 (SR 3/26th Street N)	Eastern terminus
1.000 mi = 1.609 km; 1.000 km = 0.621 mi
