= Tuscaloosa metropolitan area =

- Metropolitan Statistical Area
- Tuscaloosa, AL Metropolitan Statistical Area
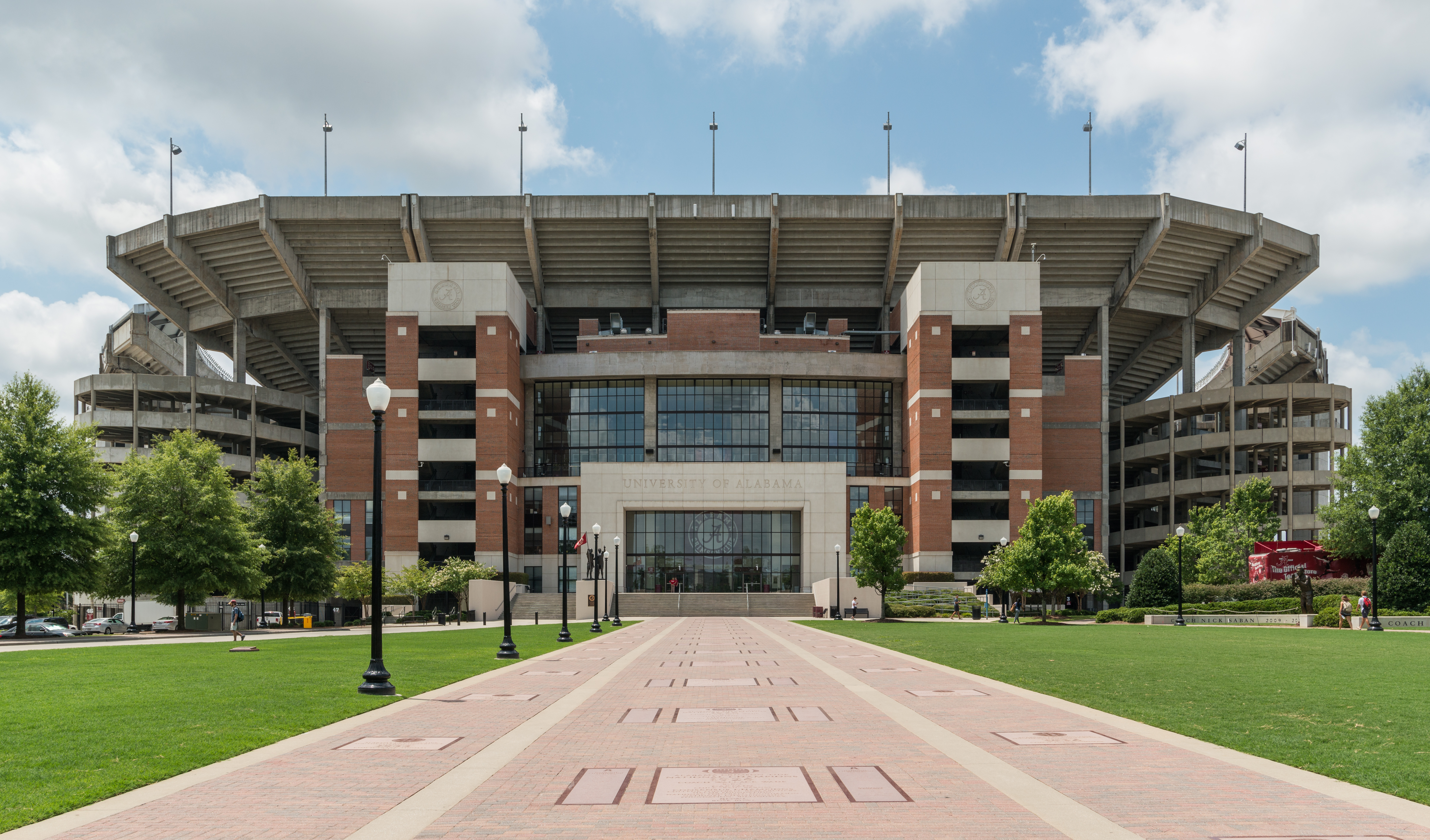
- Bryant–Denny Stadium home of Alabama Crimson Tide football team
Interactive Map of Tuscaloosa, AL MSA
City of Tuscaloosa
City of Northport
Tuscaloosa, AL MSA
- Country: United States
- State: Alabama
- Principal city: Tuscaloosa

Area
  - Total: 3,600 sq mi (9,200 km^{2})

Population
  - Total: 268,674

GDP
  - Total: $13.818 billion (2022)
- Time zone: UTC-6 (CST)
  - Summer (DST): UTC-5 (CDT)

The Tuscaloosa metropolitan area, as defined by the U.S. Office of Management and Budget, is an area consisting of four counties in west central Alabama, anchored by the city of Tuscaloosa. The MSA had a population of 268,674 at the 2020 census, increasing to an estimated 281,850 by 2025.

== Counties ==
- Hale
- Tuscaloosa
- Greene
- Pickens

== Communities ==
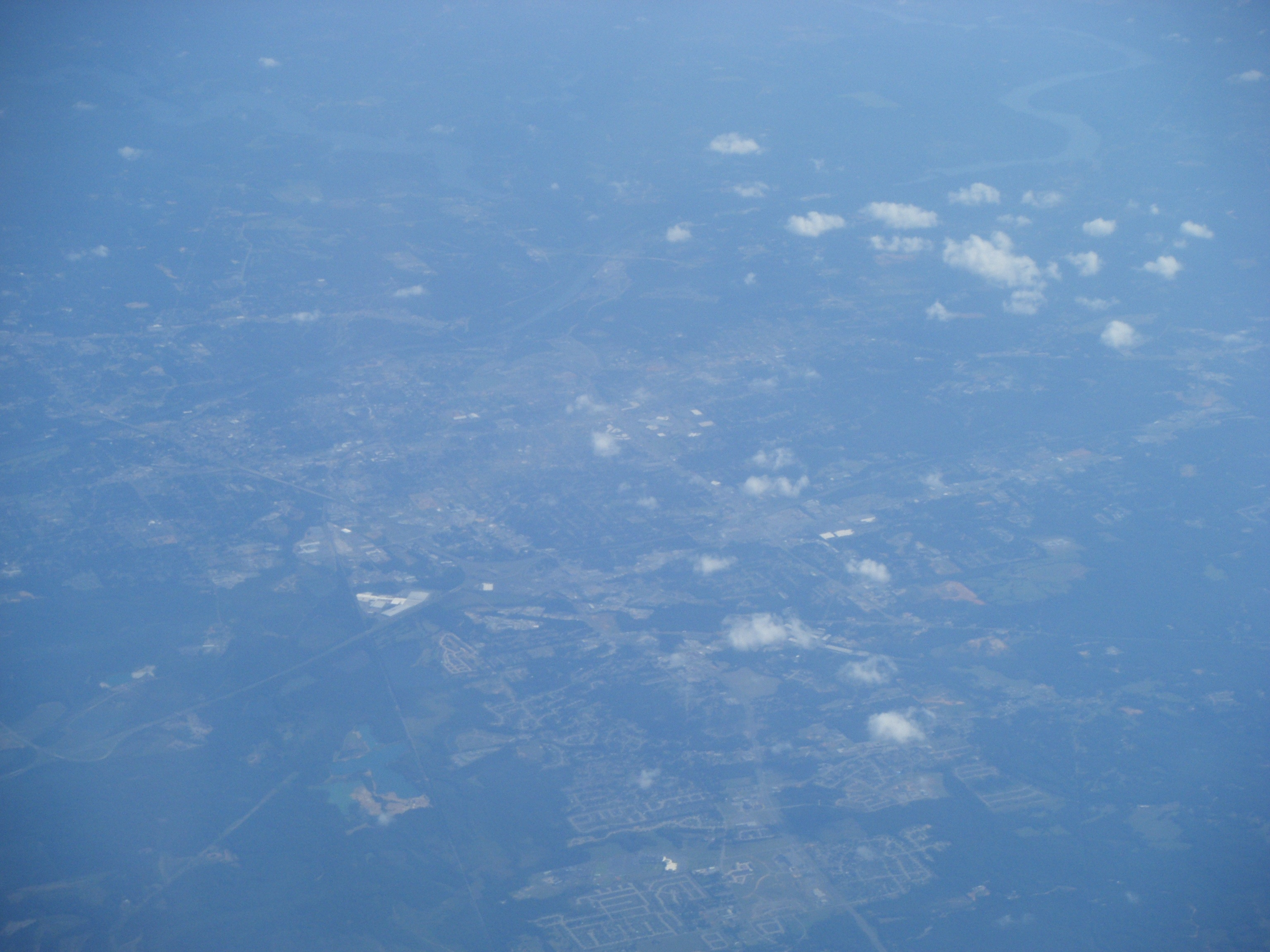
Aerial view of the Tuscaloosa area, 2012

=== Places with more than 100,000 inhabitants ===
- Tuscaloosa (Principal city)

=== Places with 15,000 to 25,000 inhabitants ===
- Northport

=== Places with 1,000 to 5,000 inhabitants ===
- Brookwood
- Coaling
- Cottondale (census-designated place)
- Eutaw
- Greensboro
- Holt (census-designated place)
- Lake View
- Moundville

=== Places with 500 to 1,000 inhabitants ===
- Akron
- Coker
- Forkland
- Vance (partial)
- Woodstock (partial)

=== Places with less than 500 inhabitants ===
- Boligee
- Newbern
- Union

=== Unincorporated places ===
- Crawford Fork

== Demographics ==
As of the census of 2000, there were 192,034 people, 74,863 households, and 48,931 families residing within the MSA. The racial makeup of the MSA was 63.05% White, 34.61% African American, 0.22% Native American, 0.81% Asian, 0.03% Pacific Islander, 0.52% from other races, and 0.77% from two or more races. Hispanic or Latino of any race were 1.22% of the population.

The median income for a household in the MSA was $26,687, and the median income for a family was $33,988. Males had a median income of $29,669 versus $20,847 for females. The per capita income for the MSA was $15,115.

County	Seat	2025 estimate	2020 Census	Change	Area	Density
Tuscaloosa	Tuscaloosa	241,368	227,036	+6.31%	1,351 sq mi (3,499 km^{2})	179/sq mi (69/km^{2})
Pickens	Carrollton	18,221	19,123	−4.72%	890 sq mi (2,305 km^{2})	20/sq mi (8/km^{2})
Hale	Greensboro	15,194	14,785	+2.77%	657 sq mi (1,702 km^{2})	23/sq mi (9/km^{2})
Greene	Eutaw	7,067	7,730	−8.58%	660 sq mi (1,709 km^{2})	11/sq mi (4/km^{2})
Total		281,850	268,674	+4.90%	3,558 sq mi (9,215 km^{2})	79/sq mi (31/km^{2})

== See also ==
- Alabama census statistical areas
