= Interstate 359 =

Auxiliary Interstate Highway in Tuscaloosa County, Alabama, United States

Interstate 359
- SR 69
- I-359 highlighted in red

Route information
- Auxiliary route of I-59
- Maintained by ALDOT
- Length: 2.76 mi (4.44 km)
- Existed: September 13, 1983–present
- NHS: Entire route

Major junctions
- South end: I-20 / I-59 / US 11 / SR 69 in Tuscaloosa
- North end: US 43 / SR 69 in Tuscaloosa

Location
- Country: United States
- State: Alabama
- Counties: Tuscaloosa

Highway system
- Interstate Highway System; Main; Auxiliary; Suffixed; Business; Future; Alabama State Highway System; Interstate; US; State
← US 331	→ SR 378

Interstate 359 (I-359) is a part of the Interstate Highway System in the US state of Alabama. It is a spur route that runs for 2.76 miles (4.44 km) entirely within the city limits of Tuscaloosa. Its terminuses are just south of I-20/I-59 interchange on the south side of town and U.S. Route 43 (US 43) in downtown Tuscaloosa. The entire length is concurrent with US 11 and State Route 69 (SR 69), with both continuing as at grade thoroughfares north and south of the shorter Interstate.

== Route description ==
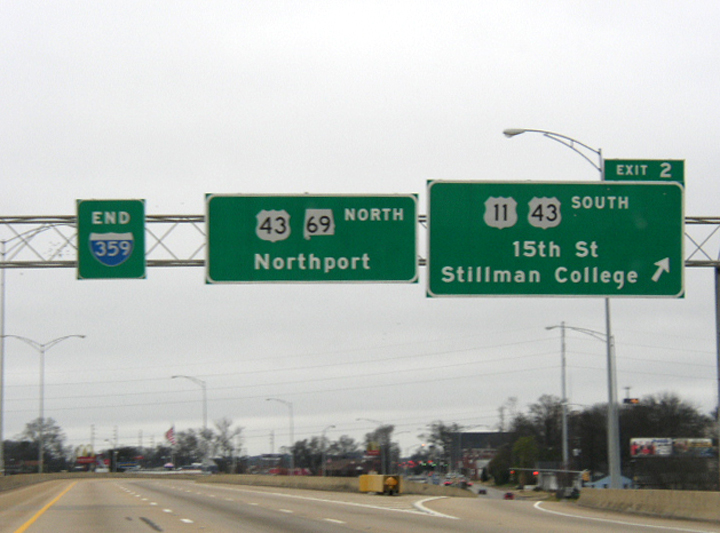
I-359 northbound at exit 2

I-359 begins just south of the I-20/I-59 interchange at the western terminus of US 11 (SR 7, Skyland Boulevard) and SR 69. From this point, the route travels in a northerly direction, where it meets I-20/I-59 at a partial cloverleaf interchange. The route reaches its first exit at Cousette Street in a half cloverleaf configuration, which provides access to the University of Alabama. I-359 then continues in a northerly direction paralleling Greensboro Avenue to its northern terminus just north of 15th Street, where the limited access freeway transitions into an at-grade thoroughfare as it enters downtown Tuscaloosa.

From its crossing of the Alabama Great Southern Railroad (AGS) through the northern terminus, the highway in its entirety is elevated along a continuous bridge span. I-359 also features a wrong-way concurrency for its entire duration with travel from downtown Tuscaloosa being signed as both I-359 and SR 69 south and US 11 north, and with travel from the south being signed both I-359 and SR 69 north and US 11 south.

== History ==
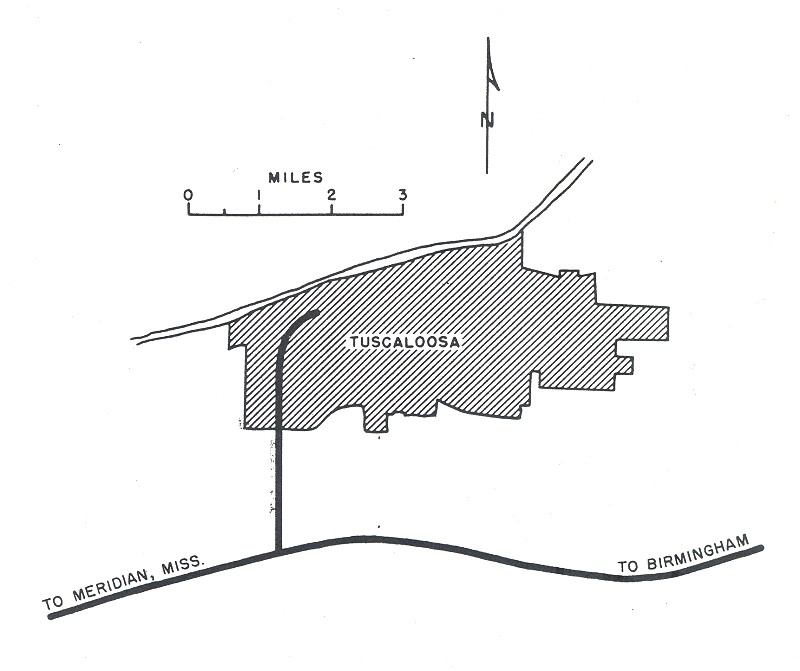
Planning map for the Tuscaloosa area freeways from 1955

In the early 1960s, local planners and elected officials stated the need for direct access to I-59 from the city of Tuscaloosa. As annexation had not yet brought the city limits to the I-59 corridor, I-359 was originally to be the only access provided to I-59 directly from Tuscaloosa. The route, as originally envisioned, was to have no exits for the duration of its route between its southern terminus at I-59 and its northern terminus at 15th Street in downtown Tuscaloosa.

Actual planning for I-359 commenced in 1961, and, by 1971, the Alabama Department of Transportation (ALDOT) announced that federal funding would be sought for its construction. Planning for the corridor continued throughout the 1970s, only to stall briefly due to complications with the required environmental impact assessment associated with the project. By 1976, it was announced I-359 would have an exit both at 35th Street (now Cousette Street) and 15th Street to improve access to both the University of Alabama and Stillman College.

In 1977, ALDOT publicly unveiled the final routing of the route and presented it at a series of public meetings in August 1977. The selected route resulted in the slight relocation of 35th Street, the construction of a bridge along 31st Street over the freeway, and the construction of a continuous viaduct along the final leg of the freeway through its 15th Street junction. Plans were also unveiled to add an additional travel lane in each direction along I-20/I-59 between its junction with I-359 and McFarland Boulevard.

Following the acquisition of the necessary right-of-way, phasing of the project was released in June 1979. The first phase included the completion of the interchange at I-20/I-59 and lane expansion; the second phase included the segment between I-20/I-59 and the AGS railroad crossing; and the third phase included the elevated segment through the northern terminus in downtown Tuscaloosa. Construction would commence in 1980 on the first phase, with the bid for the second phase setting a then-record for cost for a Tuscaloosa road project at $11.9 million (equivalent to $37.9 million in 2024). As construction was wrapping up on phase two, phase three of the project again set a record cost at $17.4 million (equivalent to $47.7 million in 2024) in January 1982. The phase included the completion of the viaduct section of the freeway, constructed at an average elevation of 22 feet (6.7 m) above grade. The first segment of I-359 opened to traffic in October 1982 between I-20/I-59 and exit 1. Costing $41 million (equivalent to $108 million in 2024) at completion, I-359 was officially dedicated and opened for traffic on September 13, 1983.

== Future ==
In 2024, ALDOT began work to convert the US 11 (Skyland Boulevard)/SR 69 intersection into a single-point urban interchange (SPUI) in order to improve traffic flow. The project, which is a joint effort between the Tuscaloosa Road Improvement Commission and ALDOT, is expected to cost $89 million and take about three years to complete.

== Exit list ==
The entire route is in Tuscaloosa, Tuscaloosa County.

mi	km	Exit	Destinations	Notes
0.00	0.00		US 11 / SR 69 south (SR 7) – Moundville	Continuation beyond southern terminus; southern end of SR 69 concurrency; eastern end of US 11 concurrency; I-20/I-59 exit 71A
0.39	0.63	—	I-20 / I-59 – Birmingham, Meridian	I-20/I-59 exit 71B; parclo interchange
1.05	1.69	1	Cousette Street	Formerly signed for 35th Street / Kauloosa Avenue
2.59	4.17	2	US 11 south / US 43 south / SR 7 south / SR 13 south (15th Street) – Stillman College	Western end of US 11 concurrency; northbound exit and southbound entrance
2.76	4.44		US 43 north / SR 69 north / SR 13 north (Lurleen B. Wallace Boulevard) / 12th Street – Northport	Northern terminus; northern end of SR 69 concurrency
1.000 mi = 1.609 km; 1.000 km = 0.621 mi: Concurrency terminus
