= Branchville, Alabama =

- Town
- Location in St. Clair County and the state of Alabama
- Coordinates: 33°38′52″N 86°26′12″W
- Country: United States
- State: Alabama
- County: St. Clair

Area
  - Total: 3.1 sq mi (8.0 km^{2})
  - Land: 3.1 sq mi (8.0 km^{2})
  - Water: 0.0 sq mi (0 km^{2})
- Elevation: 791 ft (241 m)

Population (2007)
  - Total: 993
  - Density: 320/sq mi (120/km^{2})
- Time zone: UTC-6 (Central (CST))
  - Summer (DST): UTC-5 (CDT)
- ZIP code: 35120
- Area codes: 205, 659
- FIPS code: 01-08920
- GNIS feature ID: 0164576

Branchville is a former town in St. Clair County, Alabama in the United States. As of the 2000 census, the population of the town was 825.

== Current status ==
It was incorporated in 1968. Citizens voted to dissolve the town in 2007 and the community was annexed into the neighboring town of Odenville.

== Geography ==
Branchville is located at 33°38′53″N 86°26′13″W (33.648029, -86.436895).

According to the U.S. Census Bureau, the town has a total area of 3.1 square miles (8.0 km^{2}), all land.

== Demographics ==
Historical population
Census	Pop.	Note	%±
1970	225		—
1980	365		62.2%
1990	370		1.4%
2000	825		123.0%
U.S. Decennial Census

As of the census of 2000, there were 825 people, 319 households, and 256 families residing in the town. The population density was 269.6 inhabitants per square mile (104.1/km^{2}). There were 345 housing units at an average density of 112.7 per square mile (43.5/km^{2}). The racial makeup of the town was 97.09% White, 0.36% Black or African American, 1.21%, 0.48% from other races, and 0.85% from two or more races. 1.94% of the population were Hispanic or Latino of any race.

There were 319 households, out of which 30.4% had children under the age of 18 living with them, 67.4% were married couples living together, 9.7% had a female householder with no husband present, and 19.7% were non-families. 18.2% of all households were made up of individuals, and 11.0% had someone living alone who was 65 years of age or older. The average household size was 2.59 and the average family size was 2.90.

In the town, the population was spread out, with 25.2% under the age of 18, 5.7% from 18 to 24, 27.9% from 25 to 44, 26.3% from 45 to 64, and 14.9% who were 65 years of age or older. The median age was 40 years. For every 100 females, there were 92.3 males. For every 100 females age 18 and over, there were 94.6 males.

The median income for a household in the town was $40,438, and the median income for a family was $43,594. Males had a median income of $35,313 versus $32,639 for females. The per capita income for the town was $20,541. About 6.5% of families and 7.8% of the population were below the poverty line, including 10.1% of those under age 18 and 5.3% of those age 65 or over.
