= Alabama State Route 211 =

State highway in Alabama, United States

State Route 211

Route information
- Maintained by ALDOT
- Length: 4.607 mi (7.414 km)

Major junctions
- South end: US 278 / US 431 in Gadsden
- I-59 in Reece City
- North end: US 11 in Reece City

Location
- Country: United States
- State: Alabama
- Counties: Etowah

Highway system
- Alabama State Highway System; Interstate; US; State
← SR 210	→ SR 212

State Route 211 (SR 211) is a 4.607-mile (7.414 km) state highway that serves as a connection between Gadsden and Interstate 59 (I-59) in Reece City in central Etowah County. SR 211 intersects US 278 and US 431 at its southern terminus and US 11 at its northern terminus.

== Route description ==
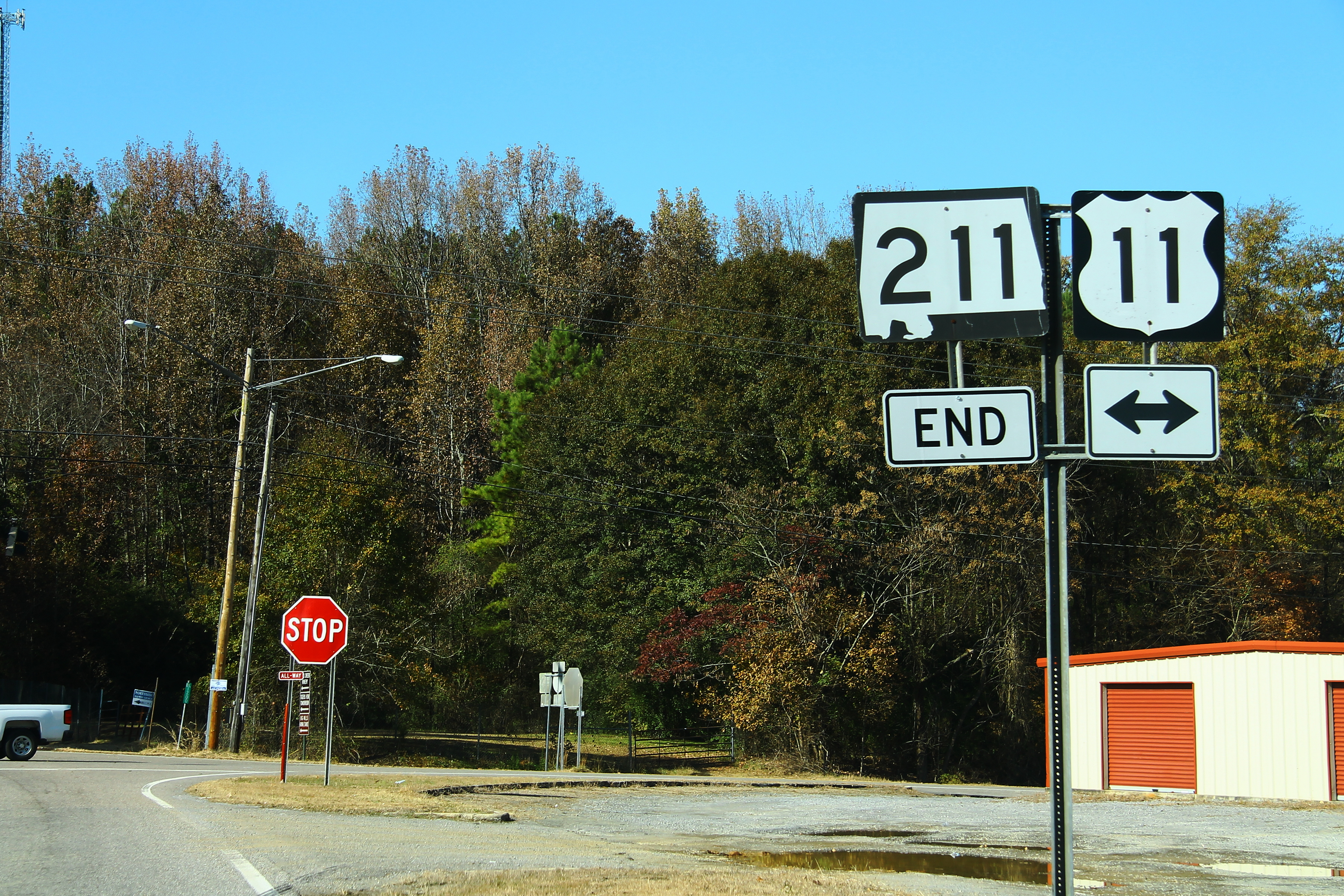
Northern terminus

SR 211 begins at its intersection with US 278/US 431 in central Gadsden. The route progresses in a northwesterly direction until it approaches Noccalula Falls Park where its turns in a northerly direction. SR 211 continues in its northwesterly track through Reece City where it intersects I-59 prior to reaching its northern terminus at US 11.

== Major intersections ==
The entire route is in Etowah County.

Location	mi	km	Destinations	Notes
Gadsden	0.0	0.0	US 278 / US 431 (SR 74/SR 1/West Meighan Boulevard)	Southern terminus
Reece City	4.194	6.750	I-59 – Birmingham, Chattanooga	I-59 exit 188
Reece City	4.607	7.414	US 11 (SR 7/Valley Drive) – Attalla, Collinsville	Northern terminus
1.000 mi = 1.609 km; 1.000 km = 0.621 mi
