= Knoxville, Alabama =

Unincorporated community in Alabama, United States

- Unincorporated community
- Location within Alabama Location within the United States
- Coordinates: 32°59′32″N 87°47′26″W
- Country: United States
- State: Alabama
- County: Greene
- Elevation: 289 ft (88 m)
- Time zone: UTC−6 (Central (CST))
  - Summer (DST): UTC−5 (CDT)
- ZIP code: 35469
- Area codes: 205, 659
- GNIS feature ID: 156570

Knoxville is an unincorporated community in Greene County, Alabama, United States. Knoxville is located at the junction of Interstates 20 and 59 with U.S. Routes 11 and 43, 11.9 miles (19.2 km) north-northeast of Eutaw. Knoxville had a post office until it closed on August 29, 2009; it still has its own ZIP code, 35469.

== Notable people ==
- James Hardy, former professional basketball player for the New Orleans Jazz
- William W. May, running athlete who competed in the 1908 Summer Olympics
