= Sulphur Springs, Alabama =

Unincorporated community in Alabama, United States

- Unincorporated community
- Location within Alabama Location within the United States
- Coordinates: 34°41′51″N 85°34′49″W
- Country: United States
- State: Alabama
- County: DeKalb
- Elevation: 925 ft (282 m)
- Time zone: UTC-6 (Central (CST))
  - Summer (DST): UTC-5 (CDT)
- Area code: 256

Sulphur Springs is an unincorporated community in DeKalb County, in the U.S. state of Alabama.

== History ==
The community was founded in the late 19th century as a stop on the Alabama Great Southern Railroad. It was named for the springs of sulphur water near the town site. The springs attracted travelers who believed in their health benefits.

Many stayed at the Alabama White Sulphur Springs Hotel, an 80-room hotel and six associated cottages, built by Col. A. B. Hanna in 1871. The hotel was long a popular resort destination, operating until 1929. Competition and the proliferation of private automobiles cut down on tourist traffic.

In addition, that was the year of the Wall Street Crash. The owners donated the hotel and its related property to the YWCA of Chattanooga. It was operated as Camp Elizabeth Lupton by the YWCA until 1953.

A post office called Sulphur Springs was established in 1885, and operated until 1918. It was moved two miles across the state border to Sulphur Springs, Georgia, where the train depot was located that brought the mail. Riders delivered it to the sister town in Alabama.
