= Vance, Alabama =

Town of Vance
- Town
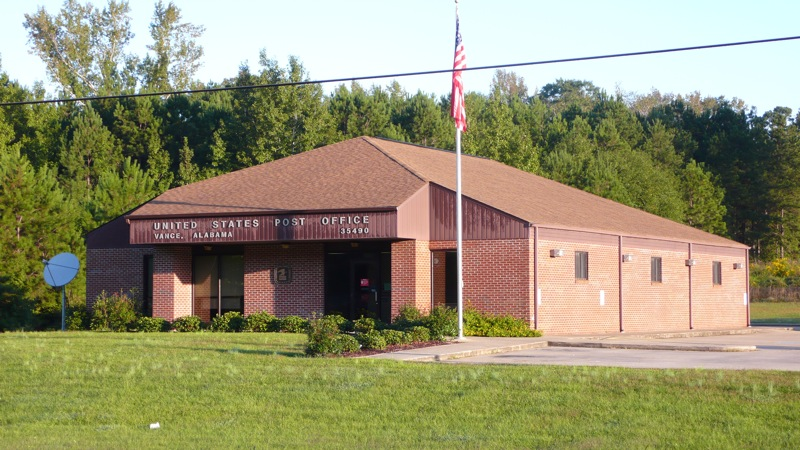
- The U.S. Post Office in Vance, Alabama

- Flag Seal

- Location of Vance in Bibb County and Tuscaloosa County, Alabama.
- Coordinates: 33°09′45″N 87°15′04″W
- Country: United States
- State: Alabama
- Counties: Tuscaloosa, Bibb

Area
  - Total: 10.21 sq mi (26.44 km^{2})
  - Land: 10.18 sq mi (26.36 km^{2})
  - Water: 0.031 sq mi (0.08 km^{2})
- Elevation: 545 ft (166 m)

Population (2020)
  - Total: 2,092
  - Density: 205.5/sq mi (79.36/km^{2})
- Time zone: UTC-6 (Central (CST))
  - Summer (DST): UTC-5 (CDT)
- ZIP code: 35490
- Area codes: 205, 659
- FIPS code: 01-78264
- GNIS feature ID: 2406787
- Website: townofvance.weebly.com

Vance is a town in Tuscaloosa and Bibb counties in the U.S. state of Alabama. As of the 2020 census, Vance had a population of 2,092. It is most famous for the Mercedes-Benz U.S. International plant, currently the only one in North America.

The Tuscaloosa County portion of Vance is part of the Tuscaloosa Metropolitan Statistical Area, while the Bibb County portion is part of the Birmingham–Hoover Metropolitan Statistical Area.

== History ==
The town of Vance was first settled in 1830 by David M. Lindley. At that time, the town was called Trion and it was a trading post on the Old Huntsville Road.

In 1872, Trion was renamed Smallwood in honor of sawmill owner Charles Smallwood.

In 1879, Smallwood was renamed its current name Vance in honor of Dr. William Vance of North Carolina. It appeared on the 1880 U.S. Census as the village of Vance's Station.

It formally incorporated in 1972.

== Education ==
Tuscaloosa County Schools operates a public school in Vance:

- Vance Elementary School

== Geography ==
Most of the town of Vance is located in southeastern Tuscaloosa County. The town extends south into Bibb County. U.S. Route 11 passes through the center of the town, leading west 21 miles (34 km) to Tuscaloosa and northeast 36 miles (58 km) to downtown Birmingham. Interstate 59 parallels Route 11 and serves Vance via Exit 89, adjacent to the Mercedes-Benz plant.

According to the U.S. Census Bureau, the town has a total area of 10.2 square miles (26.5 km^{2}), of which 10.2 square miles (26.4 km^{2}) is land and 0.04 square miles (0.1 km^{2}), or 0.29%, is water.

=== Climate ===
Average annual rainfall is 54.9 inches (1,390 mm).

== Demographics ==
Historical population
Census	Pop.	Note	%±
1880	82		—
1970	68		—
1980	254		273.5%
1990	248		−2.4%
2000	500		101.6%
2010	1,529		205.8%
2020	2,092		36.8%
U.S. Decennial Census; 2013 Estimate

=== 2020 census ===
As of the 2020 census, Vance had a population of 2,092. The median age was 33.0 years. 26.9% of residents were under the age of 18 and 8.3% of residents were 65 years of age or older. For every 100 females there were 96.8 males, and for every 100 females age 18 and over there were 98.2 males age 18 and over.

0.0% of residents lived in urban areas, while 100.0% lived in rural areas.

There were 750 households in Vance, including 380 families, of which 46.1% had children under the age of 18 living in them. Of all households, 56.5% were married-couple households, 17.2% were households with a male householder and no spouse or partner present, and 19.6% were households with a female householder and no spouse or partner present. About 18.4% of all households were made up of individuals and 6.8% had someone living alone who was 65 years of age or older.

There were 860 housing units, of which 12.8% were vacant. The homeowner vacancy rate was 4.7% and the rental vacancy rate was 14.3%.

Vance racial composition
Race	Num.	Perc.
White (non-Hispanic)	1,540	73.61%
Black or African American (non-Hispanic)	344	16.44%
Native American	1	0.05%
Asian	13	0.62%
Pacific Islander	1	0.05%
Other/Mixed	82	3.92%
Hispanic or Latino	111	5.31%

=== 2010 census ===
As of the census of 2010, there were 1,529 people, 537 households, and 400 families residing in the town. The population density was 150 inhabitants per square mile (58/km^{2}). There were 592 housing units at an average density of 58.0 per square mile (22.4/km^{2}). The racial makeup of the town was 88.8% White, 7.2% Black or African American, 0.4% Native American, 1.7% from other races, and 1.3% from two or more races. 5.6% of the population were Hispanic or Latino of any race.

There were 537 households, out of which 42.6% had children under the age of 18 living with them, 61.6% were married couples living together, 7.4% had a female householder with no husband present, and 25.5% were non-families. 19.9% of all households were made up of individuals, and 4.9% had someone living alone who was 65 years of age or older. The average household size was 2.85 and the average family size was 3.30.

In the town, the population was spread out, with 29.8% under the age of 18, 9.4% from 18 to 24, 35.3% from 25 to 44, 18.2% from 45 to 64, and 7.3% who were 65 years of age or older. The median age was 31.1 years. For every 100 females, there were 108.3 males. For every 100 females age 18 and over, there were 114.3 males.

The median income for a household in the town was $55,938, and the median income for a family was $70,114. Males had a median income of $49,583 versus $38,450 for females. The per capita income for the town was $24,406. About 3.4% of families and 4.5% of the population were below the poverty line, including 2.1% of those under age 18 and 8.7% of those age 65 or over.
