= St. Clair Springs, Alabama =

St. Clair Springs
- Unincorporated community
- Location within Alabama Location within the United States
- Coordinates: 33°45′51″N 86°24′17″W
- Country: United States
- State: Alabama
- County: St. Clair
- Elevation: 659 ft (201 m)
- Time zone: UTC-6 (Central (CST))
  - Summer (DST): UTC-5 (CDT)
- GNIS feature ID: 164843
- St. Clair Springs
- U.S. National Register of Historic Places
- U.S. Historic district
- Location within Alabama Location within the United States
- Architectural style: Late Victorian, Stick/Eastlake
- NRHP reference No.: 76002140
- Added to NRHP: April 26, 1976

St. Clair Springs is an unincorporated community and historic district in St. Clair County, Alabama, United States.

Beginning in the 1840s, people came to the area to camp around the springs. A four-room tavern was built sometime before the Civil War. In 1875, the St. Clair Springs Hotel was built near the springs, and several private homes were built in the 1880s. The hotel closed in 1902, but was soon replaced by the St. Clair Inn. The Inn burned in 1925, which effectively ended the area's tourism popularity.

The historic district was listed on the National Register of Historic Places in 1976 and includes 23 structures. The majority of houses are small Victorian cottages originally built as summer homes.
