= Reece City, Alabama =

- Town
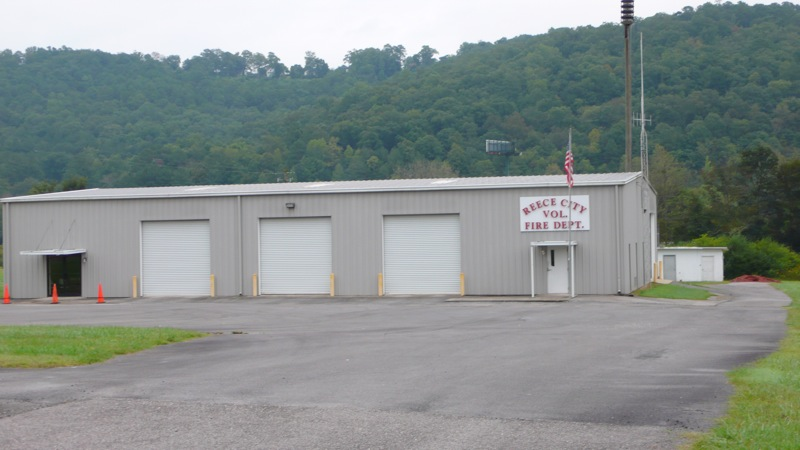
- The Reece City Volunteer Fire Department Building

- Location of Reece City in Etowah County, Alabama.
- Coordinates: 34°05′32″N 86°01′29″W
- Country: United States
- State: Alabama
- County: Etowah

Area
  - Total: 3.56 sq mi (9.23 km^{2})
  - Land: 3.56 sq mi (9.23 km^{2})
  - Water: 0 sq mi (0.00 km^{2})
- Elevation: 666 ft (203 m)

Population (2020)
  - Total: 615
  - Density: 172.6/sq mi (66.66/km^{2})
- Time zone: UTC-6 (Central (CST))
  - Summer (DST): UTC-5 (CDT)
- ZIP code: 35954
- Area code: 256
- FIPS code: 01-63984
- GNIS feature ID: 2407191

Reece City is a town in Etowah County, Alabama, United States. It was incorporated in May 1956. It is part of the Gadsden Metropolitan Statistical Area. At the 2020 census, the population was 615.

== Geography ==
Reece City is located in central Etowah County. It is in the valley of Little Wills Creek, bordered by Big Ridge to the west and Lookout Mountain to the east. U.S. Route 11 passes through the center of the town, running up the valley, and Interstate 59 runs parallel to US 11 along the east side of the town, with access from Exit 188. Alabama State Route 211 intersects US 11 and I-59, and leads south across Lookout Mountain 6 miles (10 km) to Gadsden, the county seat. Via I-59 it is 33 miles (53 km) northeast to Fort Payne and 63 miles (101 km) southwest to Birmingham.

According to the U.S. Census Bureau, Reece City has a total area of 3.6 square miles (9.2 km^{2}), all land.

== Demographics ==
Historical population
Census	Pop.	Note	%±
1960	470		—
1970	496		5.5%
1980	718		44.8%
1990	657		−8.5%
2000	634		−3.5%
2010	653		3.0%
2020	615		−5.8%
U.S. Decennial Census; 2013 Estimate

As of the census of 2000, there were 634 people, 246 households, and 203 families residing in the town. The population density was 204.9 inhabitants per square mile (79.1/km^{2}). There were 262 housing units at an average density of 84.7 per square mile (32.7/km^{2}). The racial makeup of the town was 98.74% White, 0.16% from other races, and 1.10% from two or more races. 0.63% of the population were Hispanic or Latino of any race.

There were 246 households, out of which 29.7% had children under the age of 18 living with them, 70.7% were married couples living together, 8.1% had a female householder with no husband present, and 17.1% were non-families. 16.7% of all households were made up of individuals, and 8.9% had someone living alone who was 65 years of age or older. The average household size was 2.58 and the average family size was 2.87.

In the town, the population was spread out, with 22.6% under the age of 18, 7.6% from 18 to 24, 24.8% from 25 to 44, 27.3% from 45 to 64, and 17.8% who were 65 years of age or older. The median age was 41 years. For every 100 females, there were 103.2 males. For every 100 females age 18 and over, there were 100.4 males.

The median income for a household in the town was $37,262, and the median income for a family was $39,444. Males had a median income of $30,833 versus $21,000 for females. The per capita income for the town was $16,384. About 10.7% of families and 13.2% of the population were below the poverty line, including 29.2% of those under age 18 and 6.8% of those age 65 or over.
