= Argo, Alabama =

- City
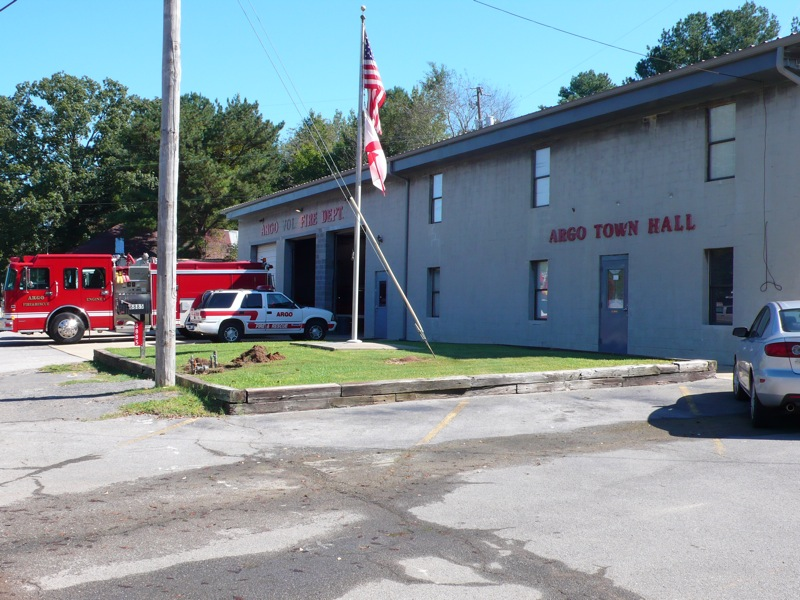
- The City Building in Argo, Alabama

- Flag Seal

- Location of Argo in Jefferson County and St. Clair County, Alabama.
- Coordinates: 33°41′48″N 86°29′40″W
- Country: United States
- State: Alabama
- Counties: St. Clair, Jefferson

Government
  - Type: Mayor-city government

Area
  - Total: 10.70 sq mi (27.72 km^{2})
  - Land: 10.64 sq mi (27.57 km^{2})
  - Water: 0.058 sq mi (0.15 km^{2})
- Elevation: 925 ft (282 m)

Population (2020)
  - Total: 4,368
  - Density: 410.3/sq mi (158.42/km^{2})
- Time zone: UTC-6 (Central (CST))
  - Summer (DST): UTC-5 (CDT)
- Area codes: 205 & 659
- FIPS code: 01-02320
- GNIS feature ID: 2405164
- Website: www.cityofargo.org

Argo is a city in Jefferson and St. Clair counties, Alabama, United States. It incorporated in 1987. At the 2020 census, the population was 4,368.

== Geography ==
According to the U.S. Census Bureau, the city has a total area of 12.3 square miles (32 km^{2}), of which 12.2 square miles (32 km^{2}) is land and 0.1 square miles (0.26 km^{2}) (0.81%) is water.

== Demographics ==
Historical population
Census	Pop.	Note	%±
1990	930		—
2000	1,780		91.4%
2010	4,071		128.7%
2020	4,368		7.3%
U.S. Decennial Census

Argo first appeared on the 1990 U.S. Census as an incorporated city.

=== 2020 census ===
Argo town, Alabama – Racial and ethnic composition Note: the US Census treats Hispanic/Latino as an ethnic category. This table excludes Latinos from the racial categories and assigns them to a separate category. Hispanics/Latinos may be of any race.
Race / Ethnicity (NH = Non-Hispanic)	Pop 2000	Pop 2010	Pop 2020	% 2000	% 2010	% 2020
White alone (NH)	1,750	3,816	3,706	98.31%	93.74%	84.84%
Black or African American alone (NH)	3	148	318	0.17%	3.64%	7.28%
Native American or Alaska Native alone (NH)	1	16	11	0.06%	0.39%	0.25%
Asian alone (NH)	1	14	18	0.06%	0.34%	0.41%
Native Hawaiian or Pacific Islander alone (NH)	1	6	0	0.06%	0.15%	0.00%
Other race alone (NH)	0	1	14	0.00%	0.02%	0.32%
Mixed race or Multiracial (NH)	11	48	206	0.62%	1.18%	4.72%
Hispanic or Latino (any race)	13	22	95	0.73%	0.54%	2.17%
Total	1,780	4,071	4,368	100.00%	100.00%	100.00%

As of the 2020 United States census, there were 4,368 people, 1,348 households, and 1,146 families residing in the city.

=== 2010 census ===
At the 2010 census, there were 4,071 people, 1,393 households, and 583 families living in the city. The population density is 333.7 people per square mile (128.8 people/km^{2}). There were 1,492 housing units at an average density of 122.3 units per square mile (47.2 units/km^{2}). The racial makeup of the city was 94.1% White, 3.6% Black or African American, 0.4% Native American, 0.3% Asian, 0.1% Pacific Islander, and 1.3% from two or more races. 0.5% of the population were Hispanic or Latino of any race.

Of the 1,393 households 41.9% had children under the age of 18 living with them, 70.3% were married couples living together, 8.5% had a female householder with no husband present, and 17.1% were non-families. 14.0% of households were one person and 4.4% were one person aged 65 or older. The average household size was 2.92 and the average family size was 3.22.

The age distribution was 29.2% under the age of 18, 6.9% from 18 to 24, 31.7% from 25 to 44, 24.2% from 45 to 64, and 8.1% 65 or older. The median age was 34.6 years. For every 100 females, there were 99.6 males. For every 100 females age 18 and over, there were 98.4 males.

The median household income was $53,917 and the median family income was $60,313. Males had a median income of $39,000 versus $35,072 for females. The per capita income for the city was $21,409. About 8.2% of families and 9.2% of the population were below the poverty line, including 14.3% of those under age 18 and 2.8% of those age 65 or over.

=== 2000 Census data ===
At the 2000 census, there were 1,780 people, 664 households, and 501 families living in the city. The population density is 146.3 people per square mile (56.5 people/km^{2}). There were 726 housing units at an average density of 59.7 units per square mile (23.1 units/km^{2}). The racial makeup of the city was 98.82% White, 0.17% Black or African American, 0.06% Native American, 0.06% Asian, 0.06% Pacific Islander, and 0.84% from two or more races. 0.73% of the population were Hispanic or Latino of any race.

Of the 664 households 39.3% had children under the age of 18 living with them, 65.5% were married couples living together, 6.3% had a female householder with no husband present, and 24.4% were non-families. 21.4% of households were one person and 7.4% were one person aged 65 or older. The average household size was 2.68 and the average family size was 3.14.

The age distribution was 28.0% under the age of 18, 6.5% from 18 to 24, 33.8% from 25 to 44, 23.1% from 45 to 64, and 8.6% 65 or older. The median age was 36 years. For every 100 females, there were 108.7 males. For every 100 females age 18 and over, there were 104.8 males.

The median household income was $41,167 and the median family income was $53,088. Males had a median income of $33,875 versus $28,625 for females. The per capita income for the city was $18,226. About 7.5% of families and 8.6% of the population were below the poverty line, including 8.1% of those under age 18 and 15.0% of those age 65 or over.

=== Historic Demographics ===
Census Year	Population & Racial Majority (Note: Note about colors: With the exception of Hispanic, Pacific Islander, Other, and 2 or More Races, the colors depicted refer to those historically ascribed to them (White (White/No background); Black (Brown); Native American (Red); Asian (Yellow)) and are there to be easily identified on said chart. No racism or malice of intent is meant to be implied by their usage.)	State Place Rank	Jefferson County Place Rank	St. Clair County Place Rank	White, Non- Hispanic	Black	Hispanic	Native American	Asian	Pacific Islander	Other	2 or More Races
1990 (Note: 1st year Argo reported on census)	930 (-) (Note: (-)Indicates no immediate prior population figure or rank) (Note: Racial demographics not reported for places of less than 1,000 on the 1990 census.)	267th (-)	38th (-)	9th (-)								
2000 (Note: With addition of "Hispanic" to census, which could also be a person of any race, both population totals and percentages will add up to more than the total population.)	1,780 ↑	211th ↑	45th ↓	6th ↑	1,750 ↑ 98.3% (Note: From 2000 onwards, White population only reported on chart as "Non-Hispanic White/One Race", which will be less than the overall White population that would also include White Hispanics, which would be counted under Hispanic exclusively.)	3 (-) 0.2%	13 (-) 0.7%	1 (-) 0.0%	1 (-) 0.0%	1 (-) 0.0%		15 (-) 0.8%
2010	4,071 ↑	134th ↑	44th ↑ (Note: Tied for 44th place in Jefferson County with County Line)	5th ↑	3,816 ↑ 93.7%	148 ↑ 3.6%	22 ↑ 0.5%	16 ↑ 0.4%	14 ↑ 0.3%	6 ↑ 0.1%	4 (-) 0.1%	51 ↑ 1.3%
