= Fosters, Alabama =

- Unincorporated community
- Location within Alabama Location within the United States
- Coordinates: 33°05′41″N 87°41′09″W
- Country: United States
- State: Alabama
- County: Tuscaloosa
- Elevation: 151 ft (46 m)
- Time zone: UTC-6 (Central (CST))
  - Summer (DST): UTC-5 (CDT)
- ZIP code: 35463
- Area codes: 205, 659
- GNIS feature ID: 156372

Fosters is an unincorporated community in Tuscaloosa County, Alabama, United States. Fosters is located along U.S. Route 11 and U.S. Route 43, 10.4 miles (16.7 km) southwest of Tuscaloosa. Fosters has a post office with ZIP code 35463. Fosters is named in honor of the family of James Foster, who settled in the area in 1818. Fosters Alabama has a population of around 1,372 as of the 2020 United States census. Fosters is home to the fosters feed & Garden supply, inc. The Fosters Foodland is also an establishment in fosters.
