= Odenville, Alabama =

- Town
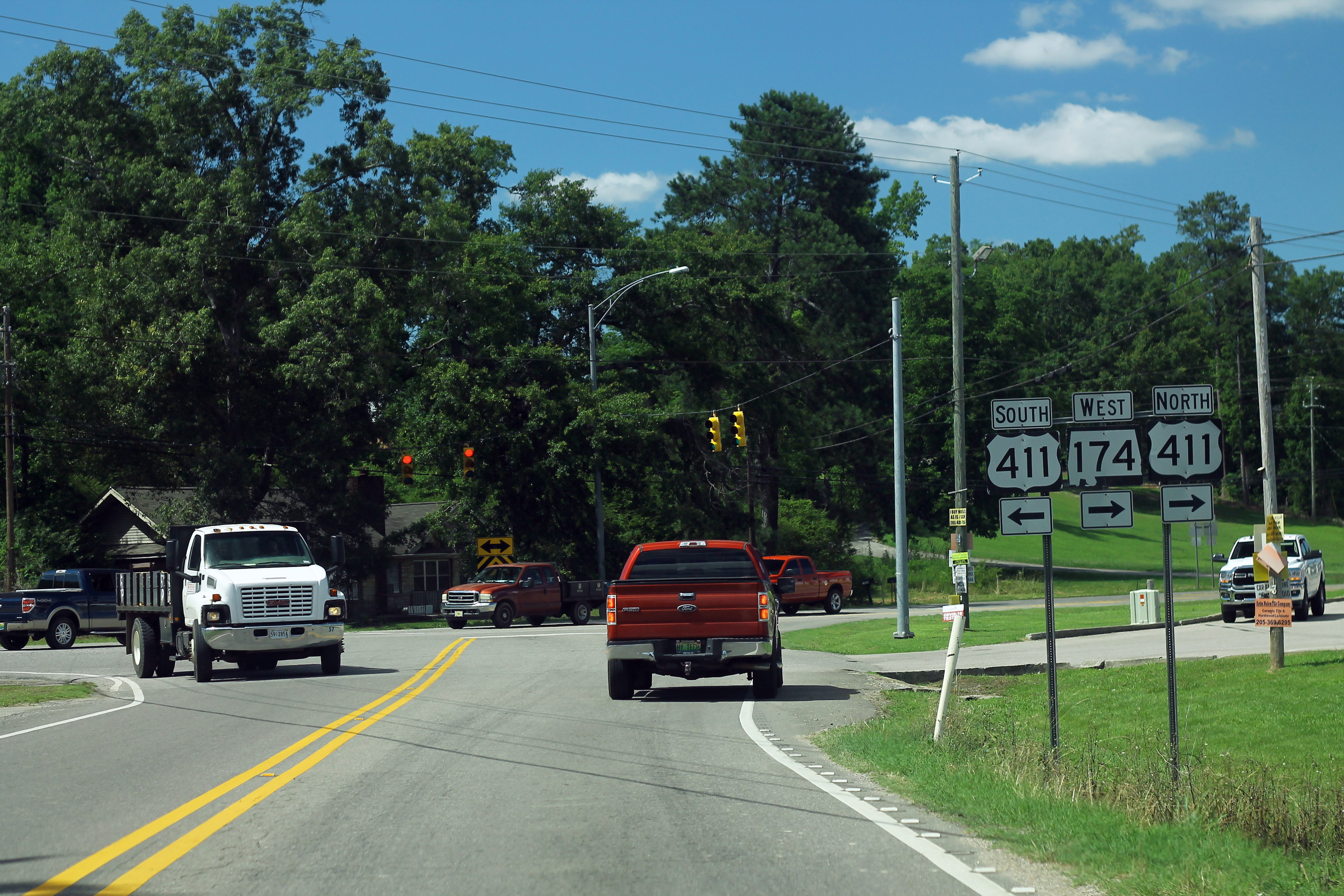
- Alabama State Route 174 West and U.S. Route 411 in Odenville.

- Location of Odenville in St. Clair County, Alabama.
- Coordinates: 33°42′40″N 86°25′20″W
- Country: United States
- State: Alabama
- County: St. Clair

Area
  - Total: 14.06 sq mi (36.42 km^{2})
  - Land: 13.97 sq mi (36.17 km^{2})
  - Water: 0.097 sq mi (0.25 km^{2})
- Elevation: 853 ft (260 m)

Population (2020)
  - Total: 4,969
  - Density: 355.8/sq mi (137.38/km^{2})
- Time zone: UTC-6 (Central (CST))
  - Summer (DST): UTC-5 (CDT)
- ZIP code: 35120
- Area codes: 205, 659
- FIPS code: 01-56400
- GNIS feature ID: 2407036
- Website: www.cityofodenville.net

Odenville is a town in St. Clair County, Alabama, United States. It incorporated in 1914. At the 2010 census the population was 3,585, up from 1,131 in 2000. It annexed the former town of Branchville in 2007. Odenville annexed a portion of Springville in 2015 due to Springville not running water to some of its residences.

== Geography ==
According to the U.S. Census Bureau, the town has a total area of 14.06 square miles (36.4 km^{2}), all land.

Odenville is located in St. Clair County and is minutes away from the cities of Birmingham and Trussville. Highway 411 transverses the town.

== Demographics ==
Historical population
Census	Pop.	Note	%±
1920	375		—
1930	318		−15.2%
1940	347		9.1%
1950	302		−13.0%
1960	300		−0.7%
1970	533		77.7%
1980	724		35.8%
1990	796		9.9%
2000	1,131		42.1%
2010	3,585		217.0%
2020	4,969		38.6%
2025 (est.)	6,023	▲	21.2%
U.S. Decennial Census; 2013 Estimate

=== 2000 census ===
At the 2000 census there were 1,131 people, 421 households, and 333 families in the town. The population density was 348.3 inhabitants per square mile (134.5/km^{2}). There were 459 housing units at an average density of 141.3 per square mile (54.6/km^{2}). This figure is now much higher, but not yet recorded, due to a continued influx of population due to desirable location, affordable real-estate and good schools. The racial makeup of the town was 95.93% White, 1.95% Black or African American, 0.35% Native American, 0.35% from other races, and 1.41% from two or more races. 1.33% of the population were Hispanic or Latino of any race. Of the 421 households 39.4% had children under the age of 18 living with them, 61.5% were married couples living together, 12.1% had a female householder with no husband present, and 20.9% were non-families. 19.5% of households were one person and 9.5% were one person aged 65 or older. The average household size was 2.69 and the average family size was 3.07.

The age distribution was 26.5% under the age of 18, 9.2% from 18 to 24, 30.7% from 25 to 44, 21.9% from 45 to 64, and 11.7% 65 or older. The median age was 35 years. For every 100 females, there were 92.5 males. For every 100 females age 18 and over, there were 92.8 males.

The median household income was $36,473 and the median family income was $40,694. Males had a median income of $31,429 versus $21,736 for females. The per capita income for the town was $17,330. About 5.0% of families and 5.9% of the population were below the poverty line, including 7.0% of those under age 18 and 10.5% of those age 65 or over.

70% were high school graduates or higher, and 7.2% had a bachelor's degree or higher.

=== 2010 census ===
At the 2010 census there were 3,585 people, 1,341 households, and 1,033 families in the town. The population density was 1,120.3 inhabitants per square mile (432.6/km^{2}). There were 1,476 housing units at an average density of 461.3 per square mile (178.1/km^{2}). The racial makeup of the town was 94.2% White, 2.3% Black or African American, 0.3% Native American, 1.1% from other races, and 1.5% from two or more races. 2.1% of the population were Hispanic or Latino of any race. Of the 1,341 households 31.6% had children under the age of 18 living with them, 61.1% were married couples living together, 10.6% had a female householder with no husband present, and 23.0% were non-families. 20.2% of households were one person and 7.2% were one person aged 65 or older. The average household size was 2.67 and the average family size was 3.06.

The age distribution was 24.7% under the age of 18, 8.8% from 18 to 24, 28.0% from 25 to 44, 26.3% from 45 to 64, and 12.1% 65 or older. The median age was 37.2 years. For every 100 females, there were 95.5 males. For every 100 females age 18 and over, there were 94.2 males.

The median household income was $53,936 and the median family income was $61,646. Males had a median income of $45,652 versus $31,875 for females. The per capita income for the town was $22,464. About 5.5% of families and 7.6% of the population were below the poverty line, including 5.4% of those under age 18 and 3.3% of those age 65 or over.

=== 2020 census ===
Odenville racial composition
Race	Num.	Perc.
White (non-Hispanic)	4,025	81.0%
Black or African American (non-Hispanic)	456	9.18%
Native American	15	0.3%
Asian	21	0.42%
Other/Mixed	305	6.14%
Hispanic or Latino	147	2.96%

As of the 2020 United States census, there were 4,969 people, 1,381 households, and 1,124 families residing in the city.

== Education ==
Odenville's school was called Walnut Grove after the name of the town. It was organized shortly after the Hardin and Vandergrift families settled in the area in 1821. The school was built around 1864 and was a log, one-room school building built in 1864. It was heated by a fireplace and was constructed near today's Pennington Garage. Odenville has had other community schools in the area since the middle of the 19th century, including the Friendship School, Low Gap School and Branchville School. The first public Odenville School, a wooden structure established by Mr. Jim Hardin and Thay Bayer, burned in 1907. Jim Hardin's school bell is in the Fortson Museum, which is located next door to the Odenville Public Library today. Students had to meet in churches during construction of a new school. On July 18, 1908, the original St. Clair County High School building was constructed. A historic monument engraved with the names of the original county leaders responsible for the construction of this first high school stands in front of what is now Odenville Middle School.

Today Odenville Schools are a part of St. Clair County School District which include Odenville Elementary School, Odenville Intermediate School, Odenville Middle School, and St. Clair County High School. Margaret Elementary, located in the neighboring city of Margaret, AL feeds into St. Clair County Schools. Students may either attend Odenville Middle School and St. Clair County High School or Springville Middle School and Springville High School.

== Notable people ==
- Ralph Compton, author, Western-style writer.
- Dee Ford, professional football linebacker
- James Shaw, professional football wide receiver.
