= Coaling, Alabama =

Town of Coaling
- Town
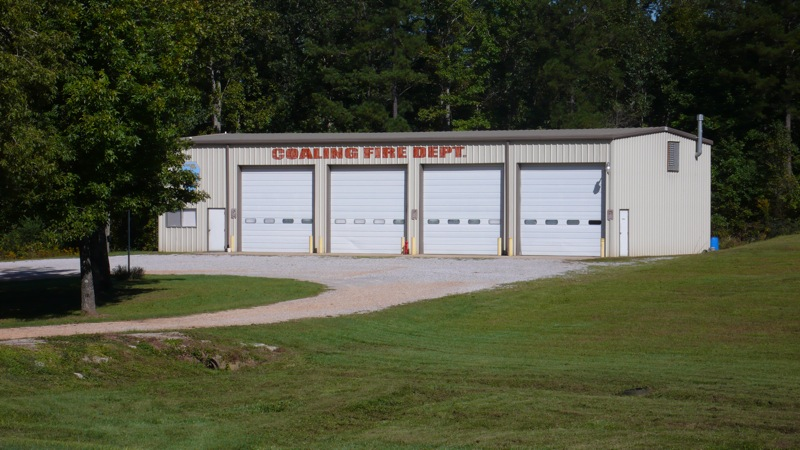
- The Fire Department Building in Coaling, Alabama

- Location of Coaling in Tuscaloosa County, Alabama.
- Coordinates: 33°09′46″N 87°21′54″W
- Country: United States
- State: Alabama
- County: Tuscaloosa
- Established: 2014

Government
  - Type: Mayor/City Council Form

Area
  - Total: 5.08 sq mi (13.16 km^{2})
  - Land: 5.01 sq mi (12.98 km^{2})
  - Water: 0.069 sq mi (0.18 km^{2})
- Elevation: 384 ft (117 m)

Population (2020)
  - Total: 2,035
  - Density: 406.0/sq mi (156.74/km^{2})
- Time zone: UTC-6 (Central (CST))
  - Summer (DST): UTC-5 (CDT)
- ZIP code: 35449, 35453
- Area codes: 205, 659
- FIPS code: 01-16000
- GNIS feature ID: 2406286
- Website: coalingalabama.com

Coaling is a town in Tuscaloosa County, Alabama, United States. It incorporated in September 1997. At the 2020 census, the population was 2,035. It is part of the Tuscaloosa, Alabama Metropolitan Statistical Area.

== History ==
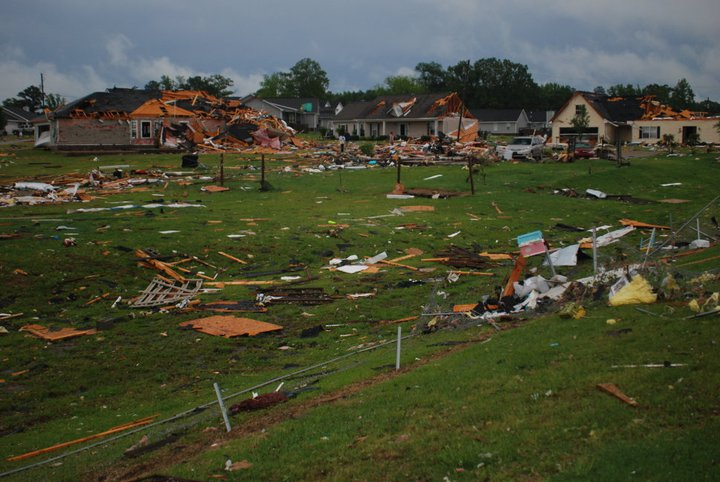
Homes damaged in Magnolia Springs subdivision.

On April 27, 2011, parts of Coaling were devastated by an EF-3 tornado at approximately 5:15 a.m. Three homes were completely destroyed, at least ten others were severely damaged, and twice as many more sustained light damage. Though there were no fatalities, some residents were hospitalized for injuries.

== Geography ==
According to the U.S. Census Bureau, the city had a total area of 3.7 square miles (9.6 km^{2}), of which 3.7 square miles (9.6 km^{2}) is land and 0.1 square miles (0.26 km^{2}) (1.61%) is water.

== Demographics ==
Historical population
Census	Pop.	Note	%±
1880	190		—
2000	1,115		—
2010	1,657		48.6%
2020	2,035		22.8%
U.S. Decennial Census; 2013 Estimate

Coaling first appeared on the 1880 U.S. Census as the village of Coaling Station. It did not appear again as a separate community on the census until 2000 after its incorporation in 1997.

=== 2020 census ===
As of the 2020 census, Coaling had a population of 2,035. The median age was 36.1 years. 25.8% of residents were under the age of 18 and 10.5% of residents were 65 years of age or older. For every 100 females there were 95.1 males, and for every 100 females age 18 and over there were 97.4 males age 18 and over.

0.0% of residents lived in urban areas, while 100.0% lived in rural areas.

There were 731 households in Coaling, of which 42.1% had children under the age of 18 living in them. Of all households, 55.4% were married-couple households, 15.3% were households with a male householder and no spouse or partner present, and 22.8% were households with a female householder and no spouse or partner present. About 19.3% of all households were made up of individuals and 6.0% had someone living alone who was 65 years of age or older.

There were 836 housing units, of which 12.6% were vacant. The homeowner vacancy rate was 1.3% and the rental vacancy rate was 17.4%.

Racial composition as of the 2020 census
Race	Number	Percent
White	1,521	74.7%
Black or African American	306	15.0%
American Indian and Alaska Native	2	0.1%
Asian	1	0.0%
Native Hawaiian and Other Pacific Islander	0	0.0%
Some other race	107	5.3%
Two or more races	98	4.8%
Hispanic or Latino (of any race)	133	6.5%

=== 2010 census ===
As of the census of 2010, there were 1,657 people, 429 households, and 335 families residing in the city. The population density was 303.6 inhabitants per square mile (117.2/km^{2}). There were 458 housing units at an average density of 124.7 per square mile (48.1/km^{2}). The racial makeup of the city was 86.42% White, 11.40% Black or African American, 0.06% Native American, 0.50% from other races, and 0.81% from two or more races. 1.68% of the population were Hispanic or Latino of any race.

Out of the 429 households, 38.5% had children under the age of 18 living with them, 64.3% were married couples living together, 10.5% had a female householder with no husband present, and 21.7% were non-families. 18.9% of all households were made up of individuals, and 6.8% had someone living alone who was 65 years of age or older. The average household size was 2.60 and the average family size was 2.97.

In the city the population was spread out, with 71.57% under the age of 18, 4.58% from 20 - 24, 15.63% from 25 - 34, 22.57% from 35 - 49, 19.25% from 50 - 64 and 6.94% who were 65 years of age or older. The median age was 35 years. For every 100 males there were 98.3 males. For every 100 females age 18 and over, there were 88.7 males.

The median income for a household in the city was $45,662, and the median income for a family was $55,125. Males had a median income of $31,371 versus $21,394 for females. The per capita income for the city was $18,664. None of the families and 1.4% of the population were living below the poverty line, including no under eighteens and 15.9% of those over 64.
