= Lake View, Alabama =

City of Lake View
- City
- Seal

- Location of Lake View in Jefferson County and Tuscaloosa County, Alabama.
- Coordinates: 33°16′42″N 87°06′26″W
- Country: United States
- State: Alabama
- County: Tuscaloosa (most); Jefferson (portion)

Area
  - Total: 2.34 sq mi (6.05 km^{2})
  - Land: 2.10 sq mi (5.44 km^{2})
  - Water: 0.24 sq mi (0.61 km^{2})
- Elevation: 528 ft (161 m)

Population (2020)
  - Total: 3,560
  - Density: 1,693.4/sq mi (653.84/km^{2})
- Time zone: UTC-6 (Central (CST))
  - Summer (DST): UTC-5 (CDT)
- FIPS code: 01-40928
- GNIS feature ID: 2405977
- Website: lakeviewalabama.gov

Lake View is a city in Alabama, United States, with the majority of the city located within Tuscaloosa County and with a small portion of the city located in Jefferson County. At the 2020 census the population was 3,560, up from 1,943 in 2010. It is part of the Tuscaloosa Metropolitan Statistical Area (the Tuscaloosa County portion) and the Birmingham metropolitan area (the Jefferson County portion). It is located approximately halfway between Tuscaloosa and Birmingham via Interstates 20 and 59.

== History ==
Lake View was incorporated in 1998.

== Geography ==
According to the U.S. Census Bureau, the town has a total area of 1.8 square miles (4.7 km^{2}), of which 1.6 square miles (4.1 km^{2}) is land and 0.2 square miles (0.52 km^{2}) (12.57%) is water.

== Demographics ==
Historical population
Census	Pop.	Note	%±
2000	1,357		—
2010	1,943		43.2%
2020	3,560		83.2%
U.S. Decennial Census; 2013 Estimate

=== Racial and ethnic composition ===
Lake View town, Alabama – Racial and ethnic composition Note: the US Census treats Hispanic/Latino as an ethnic category. This table excludes Latinos from the racial categories and assigns them to a separate category. Hispanics/Latinos may be of any race.
Race / Ethnicity (NH = Non-Hispanic)	Pop 2000	Pop 2010	Pop 2020	% 2000	% 2010	% 2020
White alone (NH)	1,319	1,816	2,634	97.20%	93.46%	73.99%
Black or African American alone (NH)	11	81	690	0.81%	4.17%	19.38%
Native American or Alaska Native alone (NH)	1	2	15	0.07%	0.10%	0.42%
Asian alone (NH)	3	14	11	0.22%	0.72%	0.31%
Native Hawaiian or Pacific Islander alone (NH)	0	0	0	0.00%	0.00%	0.00%
Other race alone (NH)	0	1	18	0.00%	0.05%	0.51%
Mixed race or Multiracial (NH)	20	17	103	1.47%	0.87%	2.89%
Hispanic or Latino (any race)	3	12	89	0.22%	0.62%	2.50%
Total	1,357	1,943	3,560	100.00%	100.00%	100.00%

=== 2020 census ===
As of the 2020 census, Lake View had a population of 3,560. The median age was 36.8 years. 24.4% of residents were under the age of 18 and 11.7% of residents were 65 years of age or older. For every 100 females there were 95.5 males, and for every 100 females age 18 and over there were 93.0 males age 18 and over.

0.0% of residents lived in urban areas, while 100.0% lived in rural areas.

There were 1,279 households and 1,258 families in Lake View, and 38.2% of households had children under the age of 18 living in them. Of all households, 62.5% were married-couple households, 13.9% were households with a male householder and no spouse or partner present, and 20.4% were households with a female householder and no spouse or partner present. About 20.0% of all households were made up of individuals and 5.1% had someone living alone who was 65 years of age or older.

There were 1,377 housing units, of which 7.1% were vacant. The homeowner vacancy rate was 4.4% and the rental vacancy rate was 15.4%.

=== Income and poverty ===
The median household income was $86,552 and the median family income was $59,674. Median income designated by the 2020 Census are listed below:

Type of Families	Median Income
Families	$85,733.00
Married - Couple Families	$91,151.00
Nonfamily Households	$90,489.00

Employment rate: 62.6%

Without health care coverage: 6.0%

=== 2010 census ===
At the 2010 census there were 1,943 people, 676 households, and 564 families in the town. The population density was 1,214.4 inhabitants per square mile (468.9/km^{2}). There were 700 housing units at an average density of 437.5 units per square mile (168.9 units/km^{2}). The racial makeup of the town was 93.9% White, 4.2% Black or African American, 0.1% Native American, 0.7% Asian, and .9% from two or more races. 0.6% of the population were Hispanic or Latino of any race. Of the 676 households 39.3% had children under the age of 18 living with them, 73.2% were married couples living together, 6.4% had a female householder with no husband present, and 16.6% were non-families. 13.2% of households were one person and 3.9% were one person aged 65 or older. The average household size was 2.87 and the average family size was 3.16.

The age distribution was 26.4% under the age of 18, 7.1% from 18 to 24, 30.8% from 25 to 44, 27.5% from 45 to 64, and 8.3% 65 or older. The median age was 35.9 years. For every 100 females, there were 96.9 males. For every 100 females age 18 and over, there were 97.8 males.

The median household income was $77,750 and the median family income was $81,250. Males had a median income of $53,646 versus $37,109 for females. The per capita income for the town was $28,334. About 0% of families and 2.4% of the population were below the poverty line, including 0% of those under age 18 and 0% of those age 65 or over.

== Education ==
The portion in Tuscaloosa County is in the Tuscaloosa County School System.

The portion in Jefferson County is in the Jefferson County Schools.

Bachelor's degree or higher: 28.6%

== See also ==
- List of towns in Alabama
