= Steele, Alabama =

- Town
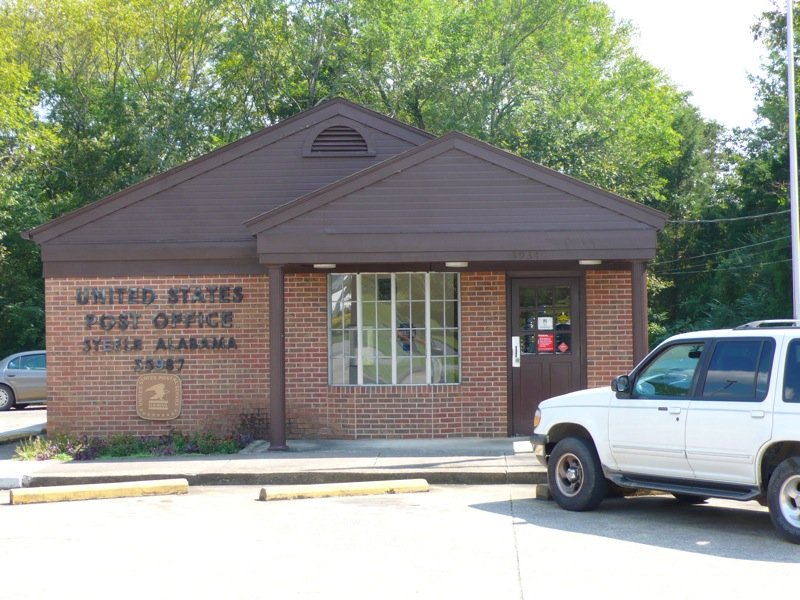
- The U.S. Post Office in Steele, Alabama

- Location of Steele in St. Clair County, Alabama.
- Coordinates: 33°56′25″N 86°11′58″W
- Country: United States
- State: Alabama
- County: St. Clair

Area
  - Total: 6.74 sq mi (17.46 km^{2})
  - Land: 6.71 sq mi (17.39 km^{2})
  - Water: 0.027 sq mi (0.07 km^{2})
- Elevation: 574 ft (175 m)

Population (2020)
  - Total: 992
  - Density: 147.8/sq mi (57.05/km^{2})
- Time zone: UTC-6 (Central (CST))
  - Summer (DST): UTC-5 (CDT)
- ZIP code: 35987
- Area code: 256
- FIPS code: 01-72888
- GNIS feature ID: 2406664
- Website: townofsteele.org

Steele is a town in northeastern St. Clair County, Alabama, United States. It was incorporated in 1952. As of the 2020 census, Steele had a population of 992. The town is a part of the Birmingham–Hoover–Cullman Combined Statistical Area. It was initially known as Steel's Station or Steele's Depot in the late 19th century.

== Geography ==
According to the U.S. Census Bureau, the town has a total area of 6.5 square miles (17 km^{2}), of which 6.5 square miles (17 km^{2}) is land and 0.15% is water.

== Demographics ==
Historical population
Census	Pop.	Note	%±
1880	98		—
1960	625		—
1970	798		27.7%
1980	795		−0.4%
1990	1,046		31.6%
2000	1,093		4.5%
2010	1,043		−4.6%
2020	992		−4.9%
U.S. Decennial Census; 2013 Estimate

=== 2000 census ===
At the 2000 census there were 1,093 people, 430 households, and 323 families in the town. The population density was 167.9 inhabitants per square mile (64.8/km^{2}). There were 471 housing units at an average density of 72.4 per square mile (28.0/km^{2}). The racial makeup of the town was 97.53% White, 0.09% Asian, 1.92% from other races, and 0.46% from two or more races. 3.20% of the population were Hispanic or Latino of any race. Of the 430 households 30.9% had children under the age of 18 living with them, 60.5% were married couples living together, 11.2% had a female householder with no husband present, and 24.7% were non-families. 23.0% of households were one person and 11.2% were one person aged 65 or older. The average household size was 2.54 and the average family size was 2.98.

The age distribution was 23.9% under the age of 18, 8.5% from 18 to 24, 30.2% from 25 to 44, 23.3% from 45 to 64, and 14.1% 65 or older. The median age was 37 years. For every 100 females, there were 97.6 males. For every 100 females age 18 and over, there were 89.5 males.

The median household income was $32,941 and the median family income was $37,885. Males had a median income of $31,346 versus $20,385 for females. The per capita income for the town was $15,380. About 9.6% of families and 10.7% of the population were below the poverty line, including 15.0% of those under age 18 and 16.3% of those age 65 or over.

=== 2010 census ===
At the 2010 census there were 1,043 people, 433 households, and 308 families in the town. The population density was 160.5 inhabitants per square mile (62.0/km^{2}). There were 490 housing units at an average density of 75.4 per square mile (29.1/km^{2}). The racial makeup of the town was 94.6% White, 0.4% Asian, 3.3% from other races, and 1.2% from two or more races. 5.1% of the population were Hispanic or Latino of any race. Of the 433 households 23.1% had children under the age of 18 living with them, 56.6% were married couples living together, 10.2% had a female householder with no husband present, and 28.9% were non-families. 25.2% of households were one person and 14.1% were one person aged 65 or older. The average household size was 2.41 and the average family size was 2.87.

The age distribution was 19.0% under the age of 18, 9.2% from 18 to 24, 24.2% from 25 to 44, 29.4% from 45 to 64, and 18.2% 65 or older. The median age was 43.4 years. For every 100 females, there were 99.8 males. For every 100 females age 18 and over, there were 102.2 males.

The median household income was $36,023 and the median family income was $41,719. Males had a median income of $35,776 versus $29,583 for females. The per capita income for the town was $18,922. About 16.3% of families and 20.6% of the population were below the poverty line, including 44.8% of those under age 18 and 6.7% of those age 65 or over.

=== 2020 census ===
Steele racial composition
Race	Num.	Perc.
White (non-Hispanic)	888	89.52%
Black or African American (non-Hispanic)	4	0.4%
Native American	5	0.5%
Asian	0	0.4%
Other/Mixed	46	4.64%
Hispanic or Latino	45	4.54%

As of the 2020 United States census, there were 992 people, 478 households, and 332 families residing in the town.
