= Alabama State Route 94 =

State highway in Alabama, United States

State Route 94

Route information
- Maintained by ALDOT
- Length: 19.143 mi (30.808 km)

Major junctions
- West end: US 331 in Ada
- East end: US 231 near Orion

Location
- Country: United States
- State: Alabama
- Counties: Montgomery

Highway system
- Alabama State Highway System; Interstate; US; State
| ← SR 93 | → SR 95 |

State Route 94 (SR 94) is a 19.143-mile-long (30.808 km) state highway that serves as a connection between the towns of Ada and Orion, completely within southern Montgomery County.

== Route description ==
SR 94 is located at an intersection with U.S. Route 331 (US 331) to the south of Ada. From this point, the highway travels in a southeasterly direction to Ramer. From Ramer, the highway travels in an easterly direction before moving in a more southeasterly direction via Dublin and Currys. It then reaches its eastern terminus, an intersection with US 231 northwest of Orion.

== Major intersections ==
The entire route is in Montgomery County.

| Location | mi | km | Destinations | Notes |
|---|---|---|---|---|
| Ada | 0.000 | 0.000 | US 331 (SR 9) / CR 14 – Highland Home, Luverne, Montgomery | Western terminus |
| | 19.143 | 30.808 | US 231 (SR 53) / CR 305 – Montgomery, Troy | Eastern terminus |
1.000 mi = 1.609 km; 1.000 km = 0.621 mi
