= Larry Chapman =

American basketball player and coach

Larry Chapman, Sr.
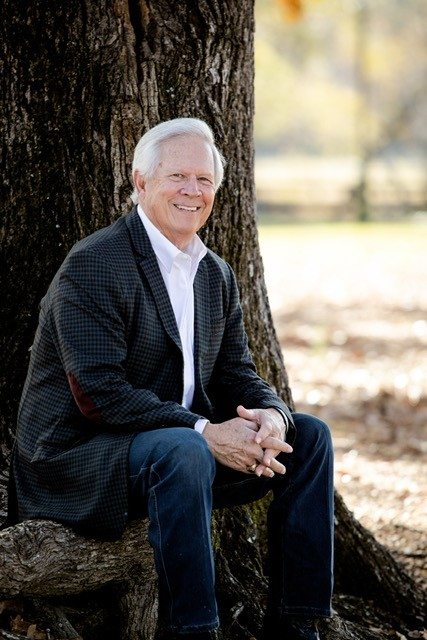
- Chapman at 82

Biographical details
- Education: Auburn (1964)

Playing career
- 1961-1964: Auburn
- Position: Guard

Coaching career (HC unless noted)
- 1974-1977: Georgia Southern (NCAA)
- 1976-2014: Auburn University at Montgomery (NAIA)

Administrative career (AD unless noted)
- 1977-1999: Auburn University at Montgomery

Head coaching record
- Overall: 705-477

Accomplishments and honors

Awards
- NAIA's Coach of the Year (1987-88)

Larry Chapman, Sr. is an American athletic coach who served as the men's college basketball head coach for Auburn University at Montgomery (AUM) from 1976 to 2014. Prior to coaching at AUM, he served 3 seasons as a head coach at Georgia Southern University, for a total of 40 seasons in his college head coaching career.

== Career ==
=== Georgia Southern ===
Chapman was head basketball coach at Georgia Southern for three seasons, from 1975-1977, where he had a 35-45 record.

=== Auburn University at Montgomery ===
Chapman came to AUM prior to the 1977-78 season. In the previous two seasons, the men's basketball team had won only 26 games. In his second season, he led the team to a 20-win season.

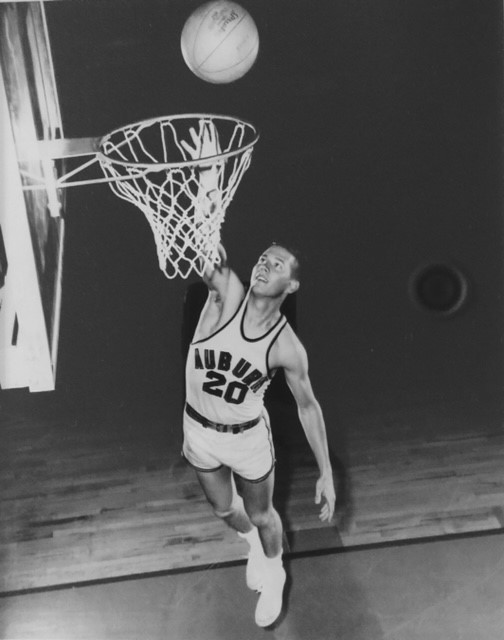
Chapman at Auburn University

Chapman's records at AUM included eight straight seasons with an average of 25 or more wins. His teams won three straight NAIA District 27 Championships with the team. He amassed a record of 679-450 at AUM, ranking him fifth in career victories among NAIA coaches and among the top 40 for all collegiate coaches. Chapman had fifteen (15) 20-win seasons. He has also coached two teams to the tournament quarterfinals and three into the second round. In total, Chapman-coached teams qualified for 11 NAIA National Tournaments.

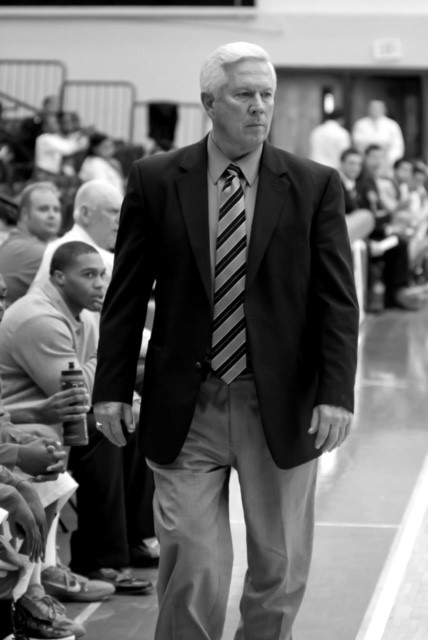
Chapman as coach at Auburn University

The 1987-88 team posted a record of 32-3 and reached the national championship game. Following that season, Chapman was named the NAIA's Coach of the Year.

Chapman was inducted into the inaugural AUM Athletic Hall of Fame class in 2005. He retired from AUM in 2014.

== After retirement ==
In 2015, one year after retiring from AUM, Chapman became head basketball coach for Macon East Academy (MEA), a college preparatory school in Cecil, Alabama. In his second season, the MEA team won the state championship, with a record of 33-0. He retired in 2018.

In 2012, Chapman, along with his son Larry Chapman, Jr, founded the Coach Chapman Foundation, which funds AUM student athlete scholarships.
