= Alabama State Route 126 =

State highway in Alabama, United States

State Route 126

Route information
- Maintained by ALDOT
- Length: 11.054 mi (17.790 km)
- Existed: 1995–present

Major junctions
- West end: SR 126 in Montgomery
- I-85 / US 80 at Waugh
- East end: Atlanta Highway in Montgomery

Location
- Country: United States
- State: Alabama
- Counties: Montgomery

Highway system
- Alabama State Highway System; Interstate; US; State
← SR 125	→ SR 127

State Route 126 (SR 126) is an 11.054-mile-long (17.790 km) state highway in Montgomery County, in the central part of the U.S. state of Alabama. The highway serves as both the northern and southern frontage roads between exits 11 and 16 along Interstate 85 (I-85) and U.S. Route 80 (US 80). Prior to US 80's realignment onto I-85 in November 2010, SR 126 was only the northern frontage road. SR 126 begins at itself, a consequence of the realignment as it forms a complete loop. A 308-foot-long (94 m) spur from the route's beginning marks the end of the route.

== Route description ==
SR 126 is a two-lane highway that travels parallel to I-85 and US 80. SR 126 is routed directly north of the southbound lanes of I-85/US-80 and south of its northbound lanes. SR 126 is in clear view of I-85 and US 80 between mileposts 12 and 21 along I-85. The route north of I-85 is the original section of the highway.

== History ==
When US 80 was rerouted onto I-85, SR 126 was extended to travel along the original route of US 80, which was the roadway paralleling the northbound lanes of I-85.

== Major intersections ==
The entire route is in Montgomery County.

Location	mi	km	Destinations	Notes
Montgomery	0.000	0.000	SR 126 (Atlanta Highway west / Ryan Road east)	Western terminus
	5.435	8.747	I-85 / US 80 west – Montgomery, Atlanta	West end of US 80 concurrency
	5.553	8.937	US 80 east (SR 8) – Waugh, Cecil	East end of US 80 concurrency
	6.920	11.137	SR 293 south to SR 110	Northern terminus of SR 293
Montgomery	10.740	17.284	SR 110 south	Northern terminus of SR 110
Montgomery	10.850	17.461	I-85 / US 80 – Montgomery, Atlanta	
Montgomery	10.995	17.695	SR 126 east (Atlanta Highway east) – Alabama Technacenter	
Montgomery	11.054	17.790	Atlanta Highway	Eastern terminus
1.000 mi = 1.609 km; 1.000 km = 0.621 mi: Concurrency terminus
