= McDade, Alabama =

- Unincorporated community
- Location within Alabama Location within the United States
- Coordinates: 32°18′57″N 86°02′47″W
- Country: United States
- State: Alabama
- County: Montgomery
- Elevation: 249 ft (76 m)
- Time zone: UTC-6 (Central (CST))
  - Summer (DST): UTC-5 (CDT)
- Area code: 334
- GNIS feature ID: 156683

McDade is an unincorporated community in Montgomery County, Alabama, United States. McDade is located near the intersection of Alabama State Route 293 and Alabama State Route 110, 16.9 miles (27.2 km) east of Montgomery. The community was settled in the 1810s and named for a prominent local family. Revolutionary War veteran James McDade is buried in the McDade family cemetery (Manning Springs)
