= List of Georgia Southern Eagles men's basketball head coaches =

The following is a list of Georgia Southern Eagles men's basketball head coaches. There have been 15 head coaches of the Eagles in their 92-season history.

Georgia Southern's current head coach is Charlie Henry. He was hired as the Eagles' head coach in March 2023, replacing Brian Burg, who was fired after the 2022-2023 season.

| No. | Tenure | Coach | Years | Record | Pct. |
|---|---|---|---|---|---|
| – | 1926–1929 | Unknown | 3 | 14–15 | .483 |
| 1 | 1930–1942 | Crook Smith | 12 | 116–59 | .663 |
| 2 | 1946–1947 | George Cukro | 1 | 8–12 | .400 |
| 3 | 1947–1967; 1977–1980 (Note: Scearce resigned on February 4, 1980. Nelson was named head coach on a permanent basis.) | J. B. Scearce | 23 | 396–225 | .638 |
| 4 | 1967–1970 | Frank Radovich | 3 | 48–24 | .667 |
| 5 | 1970–1974 | J. E. Rowe | 4 | 57–46 | .553 |
| 6 | 1974–1977 | Larry Chapman | 3 | 35–45 | .438 |
| 7 | 1980–1981 | John Nelson | 2 | 7–29 | .194 |
| 8 | 1981–1994 (Note: Kerns resigned one game into the 1994–95 season. Durham was named interim coach for the remainder of the season.) | Frank Kerns | 14 | 244–132 | .649 |
| 9 | 1994–1995* | Doug Durham | 1 | 7–20 | .259 |
| 10 | 1995–1999 | Gregg Polinsky | 4 | 34–76 | .309 |
| 11 | 1999–2009 | Jeff Price | 10 | 138–133 | .509 |
| 12 | 2009–2013 | Charlton Young | 4 | 43–84 | .339 |
| 13 | 2013–2020 | Mark Byington | 7 | 131–97 | .575 |
| 14 | 2020–2023 | Brian Burg | 3 | 42–44 | .488 |
| 15 | 2023–present | Charlie Henry | 1 | 0–0 | – |
| Totals | | 15 coaches | 92 seasons | 1,322–1,042 | .559 |
Records updated through end of 2022–23 season * - Denotes interim head coach. Source
