= Montgomery County Public Library (disambiguation) =

Montgomery County Public Library may refer to:

- Montgomery City-County Public Library, the library system of Montgomery County, Alabama
- Montgomery County Public Libraries, the library system of Montgomery County, Maryland
- Montgomery County Memorial Library System, a public library system in Montgomery County, Texas
- Montgomery County Public Library, a branch of the Ohoopee Regional Library System in Georgia
