= Old Alabama Town =

Coordinates: 32°22′53″N 86°18′12″W

Old Alabama Town is a collection of restored 19th- and 20th-century structures reflecting the lives of the people who settled and developed central Alabama. It stretches along six blocks in the heart of historic downtown Montgomery, Alabama, depicting a cross-section of architecture, history, and lifestyles from an elegant townhouse to rural pioneer living.

Old Alabama Town was developed and is administered by the Landmarks Foundation of Montgomery, a non-profit corporation that came into being in 1967. Since the purchase of the 1850s Ordeman Townhouse and its dependencies in 1968, Landmarks has acquired and restored more than 50 buildings on the site.

The Lucas Tavern serves as the visitor and information center and was formerly located in Waugh along the Federal Road. General Lafayette stayed the night at the tavern on his way to Montgomery.

== Ordeman Townhouse ==
The Ordeman Townhouse was one of the first buildings to be restored on Old Alabama Town.

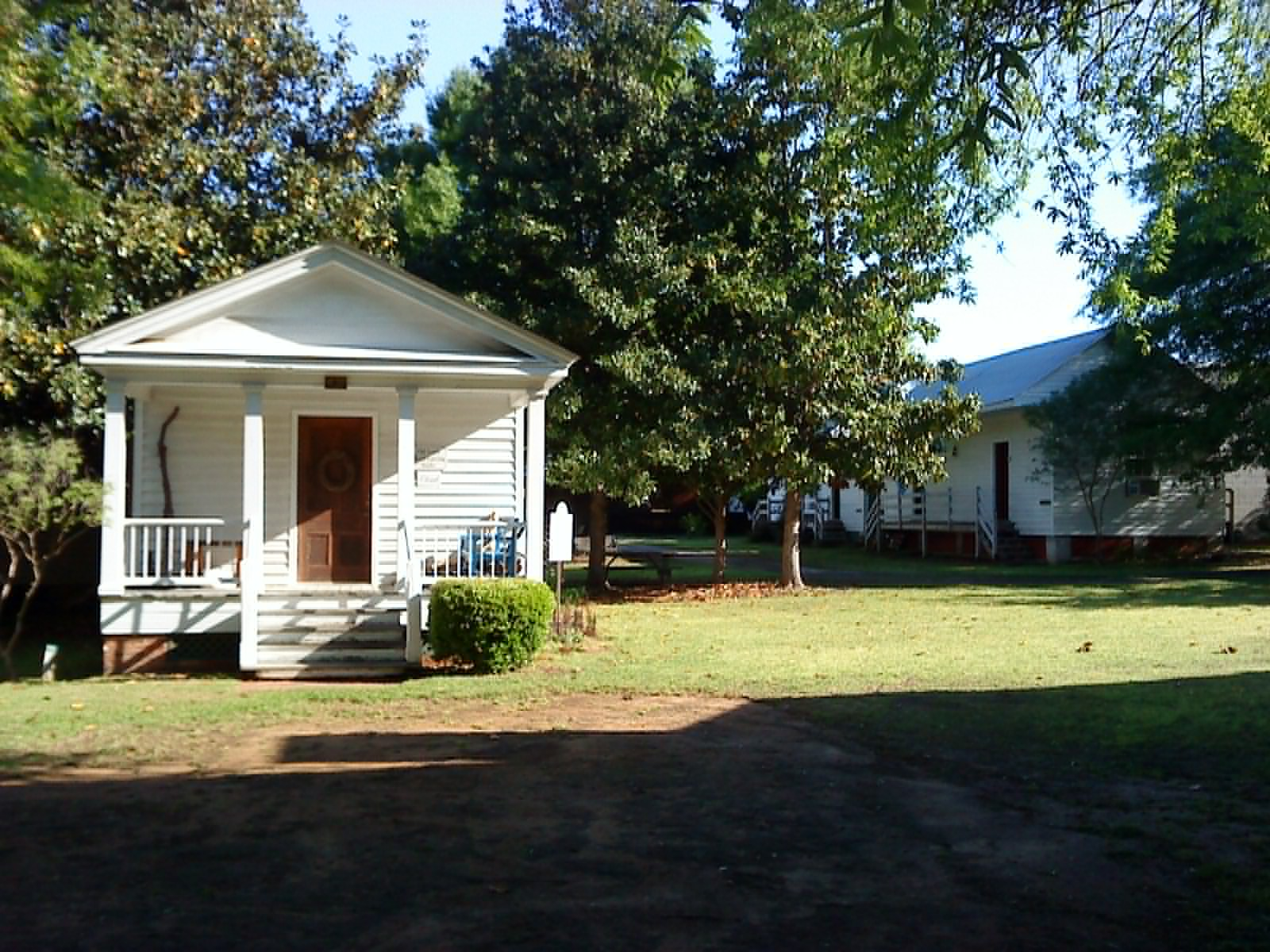
Structure on north side

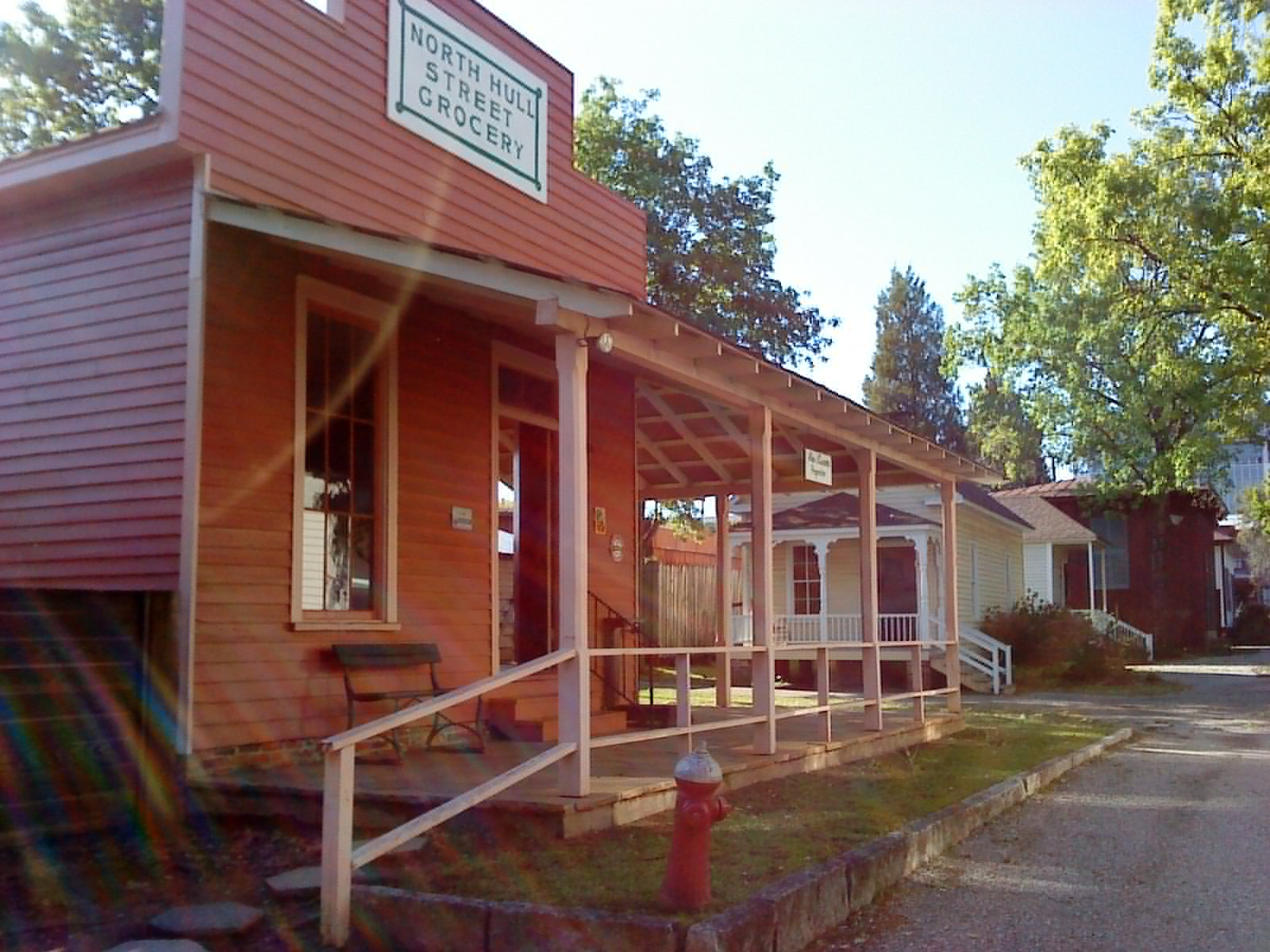
Grocery store, south side

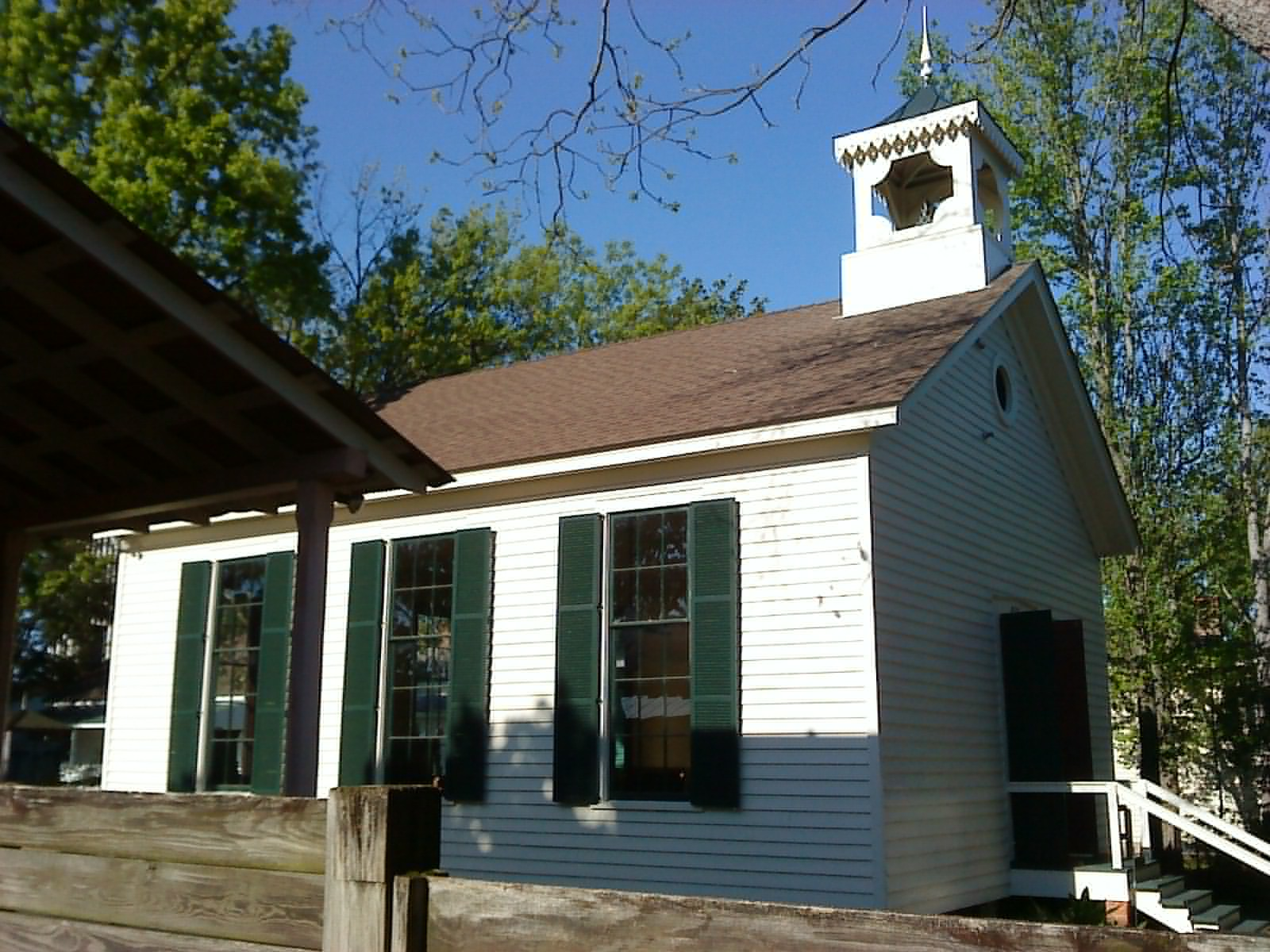
Church, south side
