= Joe Caffie =

American baseball player (1931–2011)

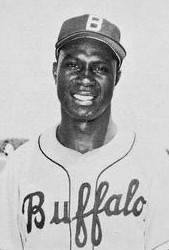
- Outfielder
- Born: February 14, 1931; Ramer, Alabama, U.S.
- Died: August 1, 2011 (aged 80); Warren, Ohio, U.S.
- Batted: Left Threw: Right

Professional debut
- NgL: 1950, for the Cleveland Buckeyes
- MLB: September 13, 1956, for the Cleveland Indians

Last MLB appearance
- September 28, 1957, for the Cleveland Indians

MLB statistics
- Batting average: .291
- Home runs: 3
- Runs batted in: 11
- Stats at Baseball Reference

Teams
- Negro leagues: Cleveland Buckeyes (1950); Major League Baseball: Cleveland Indians (1956–1957)

Joseph Clifford "Joe" Caffie (February 14, 1931 – August 1, 2011), nicknamed "Rabbit", was an American professional baseball player whose 12-year career as an outfielder began in the Negro leagues in 1950, was highlighted by 44 games played as a member of the 1956–1957 Cleveland Indians of Major League Baseball (MLB), and ended in the minor leagues in 1961. He was listed as 5 feet, 101/2 inches (1.79 m) tall and 180 pounds (82 kg), batted left-handed and threw right-handed. He was born in Ramer, Alabama, where he attended Montgomery County High School.

Caffie broke in with the Cleveland Buckeyes of the Negro American League, played one season, and then was signed by the Indians in 1951. He reached the major leagues in September 1956 in the midst of three stellar seasons with the Buffalo Bisons of the Triple-A International League, where he batted .311, .330 and .295 from 1956 to 1958; in the middle year, 1957, he was the International League's batting champion and was selected to its All-Star team.

In his 1956 stint with the Indians, Caffie appeared in a dozen games, starting ten as the Tribe's left fielder, and had 13 hits (all singles), in 38 at bats, with four bases on balls and one run batted in, batting .342. The following August, he was summoned from Buffalo in August for a more extended trial with the 1957 Indians. In 32 games, with 17 starts in the outfield, Caffie collected 24 hits, including two doubles, a triple and three home runs, and batted .270. He was hitting as high as .328 after 67 at bats on September 15, but slumped thereafter, going two for his last 22. All told, Caffie batted .291 in the majors with 37 hits. He stole three bases and was caught stealing three times.

== See also ==
- List of Negro league baseball players who played in Major League Baseball
