= Alabama State Route 293 =

State highway in Alabama, United States

State Route 293
- Milly Creek Lane
- SR 293 highlighted in red

Route information
- Maintained by ALDOT
- Length: 2.5 mi (4.0 km)

Major junctions
- South end: SR 110 north of McDade
- North end: SR 126 east of Mount Meigs

Location
- Country: United States
- State: Alabama
- Counties: Montgomery

Highway system
- Alabama State Highway System; Interstate; US; State
← SR 291	→ SR 295

State Route 293 (SR 293) is a 2.5-mile-long (4.0 km) route that serves as a connection between SR 126 east of Mount Meigs and SR 110 north of McDade in eastern Montgomery County. It parallels the future Montgomery Bypass, SR 108 for its entire length.

== Route description ==
The southern terminus of SR 293 is located at its intersection with SR 110 north of McDade. From this point, the route generally travels in a northerly direction before terminating at SR 126 east of Mount Meigs, just south of I-85.

== Major intersections ==
The entire route is in Montgomery County.

Location	mi	km	Destinations	Notes
	0.0	0.0	SR 110 (Vaughn Road) – Montgomery, Union Springs	Southern terminus
	2.5	4.0	SR 126 to I-85 / US 80 – Mount Meigs	Northern terminus; former US 80
1.000 mi = 1.609 km; 1.000 km = 0.621 mi
