= Dublin, Alabama =

- Unincorporated community
- Location within Alabama Location within the United States
- Coordinates: 32°01′56″N 86°09′33″W
- Country: United States
- State: Alabama
- County: Montgomery
- Elevation: 547 ft (167 m)
- Time zone: UTC-6 (Central (CST))
  - Summer (DST): UTC-5 (CDT)
- Area code: 334
- GNIS feature ID: 155057

Dublin, also known as Raif or Raif Branch, is an unincorporated community in Montgomery County, Alabama, United States. Dublin is located on Alabama State Route 94, 29.3 miles (47.2 km) south-southeast of Montgomery. A post office operated under the name Raif Branch from 1870 to 1894 and under the name Raif from 1894 to 1905.
