= Currys, Alabama =

- Unincorporated community
- Location within Alabama Location within the United States
- Coordinates: 32°01′07″N 86°04′51″W
- Country: United States
- State: Alabama
- County: Montgomery
- Elevation: 476 ft (145 m)
- Time zone: UTC-6 (Central (CST))
  - Summer (DST): UTC-5 (CDT)
- Area code: 334
- GNIS feature ID: 116980

Currys, also known as Lenora, is an unincorporated community in Montgomery County, Alabama, United States. Currys is located on Alabama State Route 94, 35.2 miles (56.6 km) south-southeast of Montgomery. A post office operated under the name Lenora from 1892 to 1905.
