= Montgomery County, Alabama =

County in the United States

- County
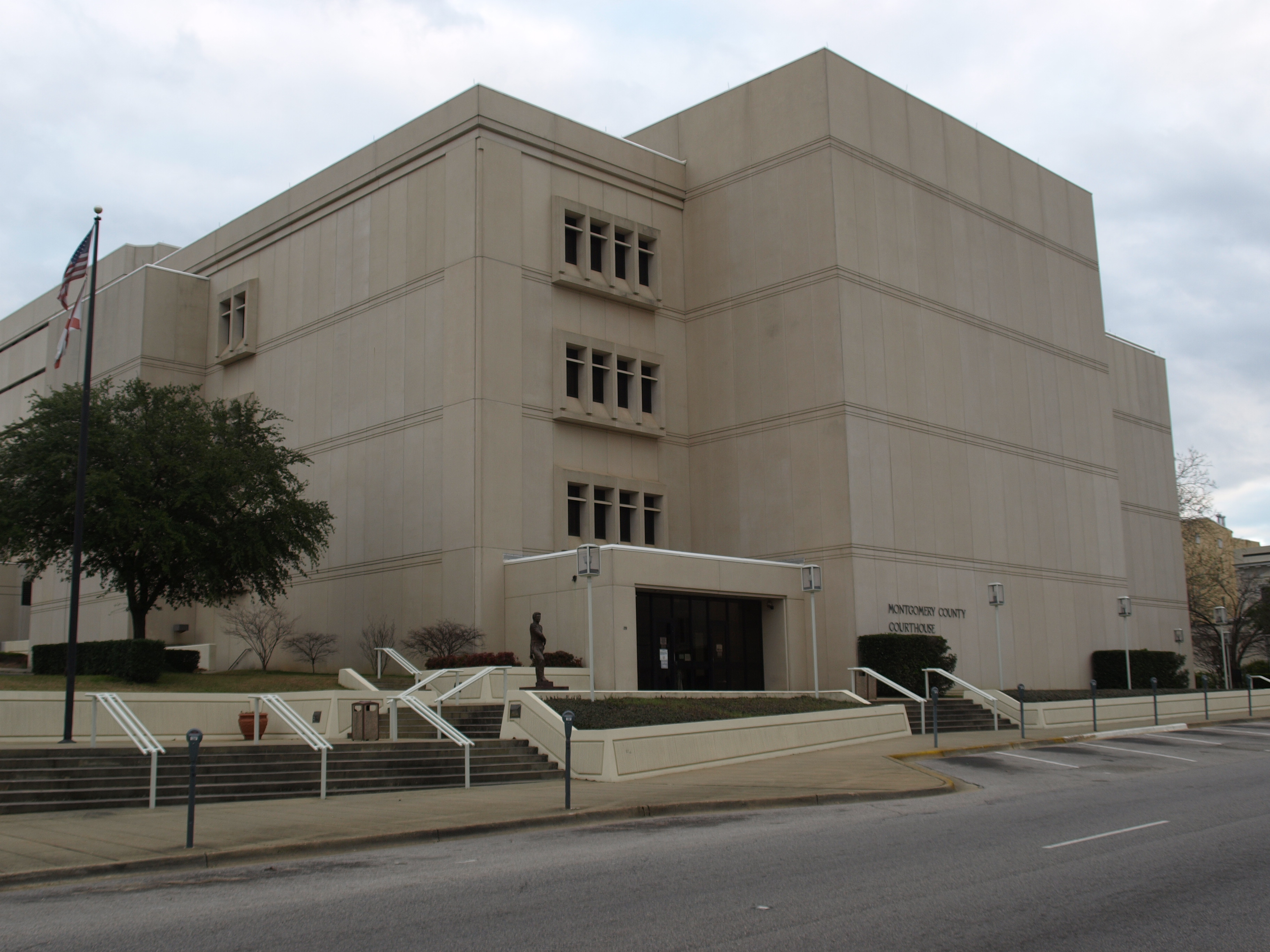
- Montgomery County Courthouse in Montgomery

- Seal

- Location within the U.S. state of Alabama
- Coordinates: 32°13′09″N 86°12′34″W
- Country: United States
- State: Alabama
- Founded: December 6, 1816
- Named for: Lemuel P. Montgomery
- Seat: Montgomery
- Largest city: Montgomery

Area
  - Total: 800 sq mi (2,100 km^{2})
  - Land: 784 sq mi (2,030 km^{2})
  - Water: 16 sq mi (41 km^{2}) 2.0%

Population (2020)
  - Total: 228,954
  - Estimate (2025): 225,891 ▼
  - Density: 292/sq mi (113/km^{2})
- Time zone: UTC−6 (Central)
  - Summer (DST): UTC−5 (CDT)
- Congressional district: 2nd
- Website: www.mc-ala.org
- County Number 03 on Alabama License Plates; One of three counties shuffled to the top 3 numbers because of population size; Largest County by population not shuffled to top 07 on Alabama License Plates

Montgomery County is a county located in the U.S. state of Alabama. As of the 2020 census, its population was 228,954, making it the seventh-most populous county in Alabama. Its county seat is Montgomery, the state capital. Montgomery County is included in the Montgomery metropolitan area.

== History ==
Montgomery County was established by dividing Monroe County on December 6, 1816, by the Mississippi Territorial Legislature. It is named for Lemuel P. Montgomery, a young U.S. Army officer killed at the Battle of Horseshoe Bend, the final battle of the Creek Indian war, which was waged concurrently with the War of 1812.

The city of Montgomery, which is the county seat, is named for Richard Montgomery, an American Revolutionary War general killed in 1775 while attempting to capture Quebec City, Canada.

Over much of the 19th century great wealth was derived from the cotton crop, with the Civil War producing a temporary setback. More lasting trouble came in 1914 with the arrival of the boll weevil, which became very destructive to the cotton harvest from 1915 on. By the 1940s county farms earned more from cattle than cotton.

== Geography ==
According to the United States Census Bureau, the county has a total area of 800 square miles (2,100 km^{2}), of which 784 square miles (2,030 km^{2}) is land and 16 square miles (41 km^{2}) (2.0%) is water.

=== Major highways ===
- Interstate 65
- Interstate 85
- Interstate 685 (future)
- U.S. Highway 31 / State Route 3 (unsigned)
- U.S. Highway 80 / State Route 8 (unsigned)
- U.S. Highway 82 / State Route 6 (unsigned)
- U.S. Highway 231 / State Route 53 (unsigned)
- U.S. Highway 331
- State Route 9 (unsigned)
- State Route 21
- State Route 94
- State Route 97
- State Route 108
- State Route 110
- State Route 126
- State Route 143
- State Route 152
- State Route 271
- State Route 293

=== Transit ===
- Montgomery Area Transit System

=== Adjacent counties ===
- Elmore County (north)
- Macon County (northeast)
- Bullock County (east)
- Pike County (southeast)
- Crenshaw County (southwest)
- Lowndes County (west)
- Autauga County (northwest)

=== National protected area ===
- Selma to Montgomery National Historic Trail (part)

== Demographics ==
Historical population
| Census | Pop. | Note | %± |
|---|---|---|---|
| 1820 | 6,604 | | — |
| 1830 | 12,695 | | 92.2% |
| 1840 | 24,574 | | 93.6% |
| 1850 | 29,711 | | 20.9% |
| 1860 | 35,904 | | 20.8% |
| 1870 | 43,704 | | 21.7% |
| 1880 | 52,356 | | 19.8% |
| 1890 | 56,172 | | 7.3% |
| 1900 | 72,047 | | 28.3% |
| 1910 | 82,178 | | 14.1% |
| 1920 | 80,853 | | −1.6% |
| 1930 | 98,671 | | 22.0% |
| 1940 | 114,420 | | 16.0% |
| 1950 | 138,965 | | 21.5% |
| 1960 | 169,210 | | 21.8% |
| 1970 | 167,790 | | −0.8% |
| 1980 | 197,038 | | 17.4% |
| 1990 | 209,085 | | 6.1% |
| 2000 | 223,510 | | 6.9% |
| 2010 | 229,363 | | 2.6% |
| 2020 | 228,954 | | −0.2% |
| 2025 (est.) | 225,891 | ▼ | −1.3% |
U.S. Decennial Census; 1790–1960 1900–1990; 1990–2000 2010–2020

=== Racial and ethnic composition ===
Montgomery County, Alabama – Racial and ethnic composition Note: the US Census treats Hispanic/Latino as an ethnic category. This table excludes Latinos from the racial categories and assigns them to a separate category. Hispanics/Latinos may be of any race.
| Race / Ethnicity (NH = Non-Hispanic) | Pop 2000 | Pop 2010 | Pop 2020 | % 2000 | % 2010 | % 2020 |
|---|---|---|---|---|---|---|
| White alone (NH) | 107,858 | 88,099 | 73,354 | 48.26% | 38.41% | 32.04% |
| Black or African American alone (NH) | 108,146 | 124,928 | 129,801 | 48.39% | 54.47% | 56.69% |
| Native American or Alaska Native alone (NH) | 530 | 520 | 364 | 0.24% | 0.23% | 0.16% |
| Asian alone (NH) | 2,189 | 4,792 | 7,952 | 0.98% | 2.09% | 3.47% |
| Pacific Islander alone (NH) | 67 | 84 | 119 | 0.03% | 0.04% | 0.05% |
| Other race alone (NH) | 178 | 187 | 722 | 0.08% | 0.08% | 0.32% |
| Mixed race or Multiracial (NH) | 1,877 | 2,439 | 5,958 | 0.84% | 1.06% | 2.60% |
| Hispanic or Latino (any race) | 2,665 | 8,314 | 10,684 | 1.19% | 3.62% | 4.67% |
| Total | 223,510 | 229,363 | 228,954 | 100.00% | 100.00% | 100.00% |

=== 2020 census ===
As of the 2020 census, the county had a population of 228,954. The median age was 38.1 years. 22.5% of residents were under the age of 18 and 16.1% of residents were 65 years of age or older. For every 100 females there were 89.2 males, and for every 100 females age 18 and over there were 85.3 males age 18 and over.

The racial makeup of the county was 32.8% White, 57.0% Black or African American, 0.3% American Indian and Alaska Native, 3.5% Asian, 0.1% Native Hawaiian and Pacific Islander, 2.7% from some other race, and 3.6% from two or more races. Hispanic or Latino residents of any race comprised 4.7% of the population.

87.6% of residents lived in urban areas, while 12.4% lived in rural areas.

There were 93,223 households in the county, of which 29.6% had children under the age of 18 living with them and 39.4% had a female householder with no spouse or partner present. About 34.2% of all households were made up of individuals and 12.1% had someone living alone who was 65 years of age or older.

There were 105,293 housing units, of which 11.5% were vacant. Among occupied housing units, 56.3% were owner-occupied and 43.7% were renter-occupied. The homeowner vacancy rate was 1.5% and the rental vacancy rate was 9.3%.

=== 2010 census ===
The 2010 census reported the following county population:

- 54.7% Black
- 39.5% White
- 3.6% Hispanic or Latino (of any race)
- 1.3% Two or more races
- 1.2% Asian
- 0.3% Native American
- 0.0% Native Hawaiian or Pacific Islander

=== 2000 census ===
As of the 2000 census, there were 223,510 persons, 86,068 households, and 56,804 families in the county. The population density was 283 persons per square mile (109 persons/km^{2}). There were 95,437 housing units, at an average density of 121 units per square mile (47 units/km^{2}). The racial makeup of the county (including Hispanics in the racial counts) was 48.85% White, 48.58% Black or African American, 0.99% Asian, 0.25% Native American, 0.03% Pacific Islander, 0.35% from other races, and 0.94% from two or more races. Hispanics and Latinos, of any race, made up 1.19% of the population.

There were 86,068 households, 32.20% of which included children under the age of 18, 43.80% were married couples living together, 18.60% had a female householder with no husband present, and 34.00% were non-families. Single-persons households were 29.50% of the total; 9.40% had someone living alone who was 65 years of age or older. The average household size was 2.46. The average family size was 3.06.

Persons younger than 18 were 25.80% of the population; those 18–24, 11.70%; 25–44, 29.80%; 45–64, 20.90%; and 65 and older, 11.80%. The median age was 34 years. For every 100 females, there were 90.80 males. For every 100 females aged 18 and over, there were 86.70 males.

The median income for a household in the county was $35,962, and the median income for a family was $44,669. Males had a median income of $32,018; females, $24,921. The per capita income for the county was $19,358. About 13.50% of families and 17.30% of the population were below the poverty line, including 25.10% of those under age 18 and 13.70% of those 65 and older.

== Politics ==
Montgomery County is a strongly Democratic county like most of the Black Belt in Alabama. The last Republican to win the county was George H. W. Bush in 1992.

United States presidential election results for Montgomery County, Alabama
| Year | Republican | | Democratic | | Third party(ies) | |
| Year | No. | % | No. | % | No. | % |
|---|---|---|---|---|---|---|
| 1824 | 163 | 17.16% | 452 | 47.58% | 335 | 35.26% |
| 1828 | 37 | 9.23% | 364 | 90.77% | 0 | 0.00% |
| 1832 | 0 | 0.00% | 783 | 100.00% | 0 | 0.00% |
| 1836 | 944 | 56.63% | 723 | 43.37% | 0 | 0.00% |
| 1840 | 1,134 | 58.27% | 812 | 41.73% | 0 | 0.00% |
| 1844 | 1,016 | 54.86% | 836 | 45.14% | 0 | 0.00% |
| 1848 | 1,176 | 63.74% | 669 | 36.26% | 0 | 0.00% |
| 1852 | 717 | 52.26% | 557 | 40.60% | 98 | 7.14% |
| 1856 | 0 | 0.00% | 1,100 | 48.72% | 1,158 | 51.28% |
| 1860 | 0 | 0.00% | 133 | 4.89% | 2,589 | 95.11% |
| 1868 | 6,770 | 74.51% | 2,316 | 25.49% | 0 | 0.00% |
| 1872 | 7,096 | 70.43% | 2,979 | 29.57% | 0 | 0.00% |
| 1876 | 6,259 | 72.44% | 2,381 | 27.56% | 0 | 0.00% |
| 1880 | 5,469 | 64.50% | 2,971 | 35.04% | 39 | 0.46% |
| 1884 | 5,210 | 66.57% | 2,587 | 33.06% | 29 | 0.37% |
| 1888 | 2,966 | 44.41% | 3,712 | 55.58% | 1 | 0.01% |
| 1892 | 7 | 0.11% | 3,702 | 57.02% | 2,784 | 42.88% |
| 1896 | 977 | 23.26% | 2,653 | 63.17% | 570 | 13.57% |
| 1900 | 567 | 15.06% | 3,047 | 80.91% | 152 | 4.04% |
| 1904 | 50 | 1.96% | 2,492 | 97.53% | 13 | 0.51% |
| 1908 | 79 | 2.91% | 2,621 | 96.54% | 15 | 0.55% |
| 1912 | 43 | 1.33% | 3,047 | 94.10% | 148 | 4.57% |
| 1916 | 106 | 3.07% | 3,316 | 96.06% | 30 | 0.87% |
| 1920 | 314 | 4.63% | 6,411 | 94.63% | 50 | 0.74% |
| 1924 | 233 | 4.62% | 4,422 | 87.70% | 387 | 7.68% |
| 1928 | 3,114 | 32.90% | 6,347 | 67.06% | 3 | 0.03% |
| 1932 | 441 | 4.19% | 10,066 | 95.57% | 26 | 0.25% |
| 1936 | 223 | 1.81% | 12,061 | 97.80% | 48 | 0.39% |
| 1940 | 230 | 1.99% | 11,311 | 97.74% | 32 | 0.28% |
| 1944 | 381 | 3.98% | 9,143 | 95.62% | 38 | 0.40% |
| 1948 | 802 | 11.13% | 0 | 0.00% | 6,402 | 88.87% |
| 1952 | 8,102 | 46.22% | 9,234 | 52.68% | 193 | 1.10% |
| 1956 | 8,727 | 46.32% | 6,890 | 36.57% | 3,224 | 17.11% |
| 1960 | 11,778 | 54.91% | 9,421 | 43.92% | 249 | 1.16% |
| 1964 | 23,015 | 75.47% | 0 | 0.00% | 7,482 | 24.53% |
| 1968 | 6,746 | 14.50% | 12,088 | 25.98% | 27,691 | 59.52% |
| 1972 | 35,353 | 71.86% | 12,723 | 25.86% | 1,121 | 2.28% |
| 1976 | 29,360 | 53.64% | 24,641 | 45.02% | 732 | 1.34% |
| 1980 | 35,745 | 53.75% | 28,018 | 42.13% | 2,741 | 4.12% |
| 1984 | 43,328 | 57.77% | 31,206 | 41.61% | 471 | 0.63% |
| 1988 | 41,131 | 58.43% | 28,709 | 40.79% | 551 | 0.78% |
| 1992 | 40,742 | 47.29% | 37,342 | 43.34% | 8,068 | 9.36% |
| 1996 | 37,784 | 47.98% | 38,382 | 48.74% | 2,578 | 3.27% |
| 2000 | 38,827 | 48.34% | 40,371 | 50.26% | 1,130 | 1.41% |
| 2004 | 44,097 | 49.19% | 45,160 | 50.37% | 393 | 0.44% |
| 2008 | 42,031 | 40.13% | 62,166 | 59.35% | 546 | 0.52% |
| 2012 | 38,332 | 37.56% | 63,085 | 61.81% | 650 | 0.64% |
| 2016 | 34,003 | 35.46% | 58,916 | 61.45% | 2,959 | 3.09% |
| 2020 | 33,311 | 33.60% | 64,529 | 65.09% | 1,299 | 1.31% |
| 2024 | 30,477 | 33.94% | 57,946 | 64.53% | 1,375 | 1.53% |

United States Senate election results for Montgomery County, Alabama2
| Year | Republican | | Democratic | | Third party(ies) | |
| Year | No. | % | No. | % | No. | % |
|---|---|---|---|---|---|---|
| 2020 | 32,221 | 32.57% | 66,592 | 67.31% | 125 | 0.13% |

United States Senate election results for Montgomery County, Alabama3
| Year | Republican | | Democratic | | Third party(ies) | |
| Year | No. | % | No. | % | No. | % |
|---|---|---|---|---|---|---|
| 2022 | 22,741 | 39.41% | 33,685 | 58.37% | 1,279 | 2.22% |

Alabama Gubernatorial election results for Montgomery County
| Year | Republican | | Democratic | | Third party(ies) | |
| Year | No. | % | No. | % | No. | % |
|---|---|---|---|---|---|---|
| 2022 | 23,565 | 40.83% | 32,511 | 56.33% | 1,636 | 2.83% |

Infrastructure inside Montgomery County includes both Interstate 85 and 65 along with shipping hubs on the Alabama River and rail hubs located in the City of Montgomery. The Montgomery Regional Airport also serves as a major airport for the State of Alabama and the Southeastern US for passenger service, military aviation, and commercial aviation.

== Education ==
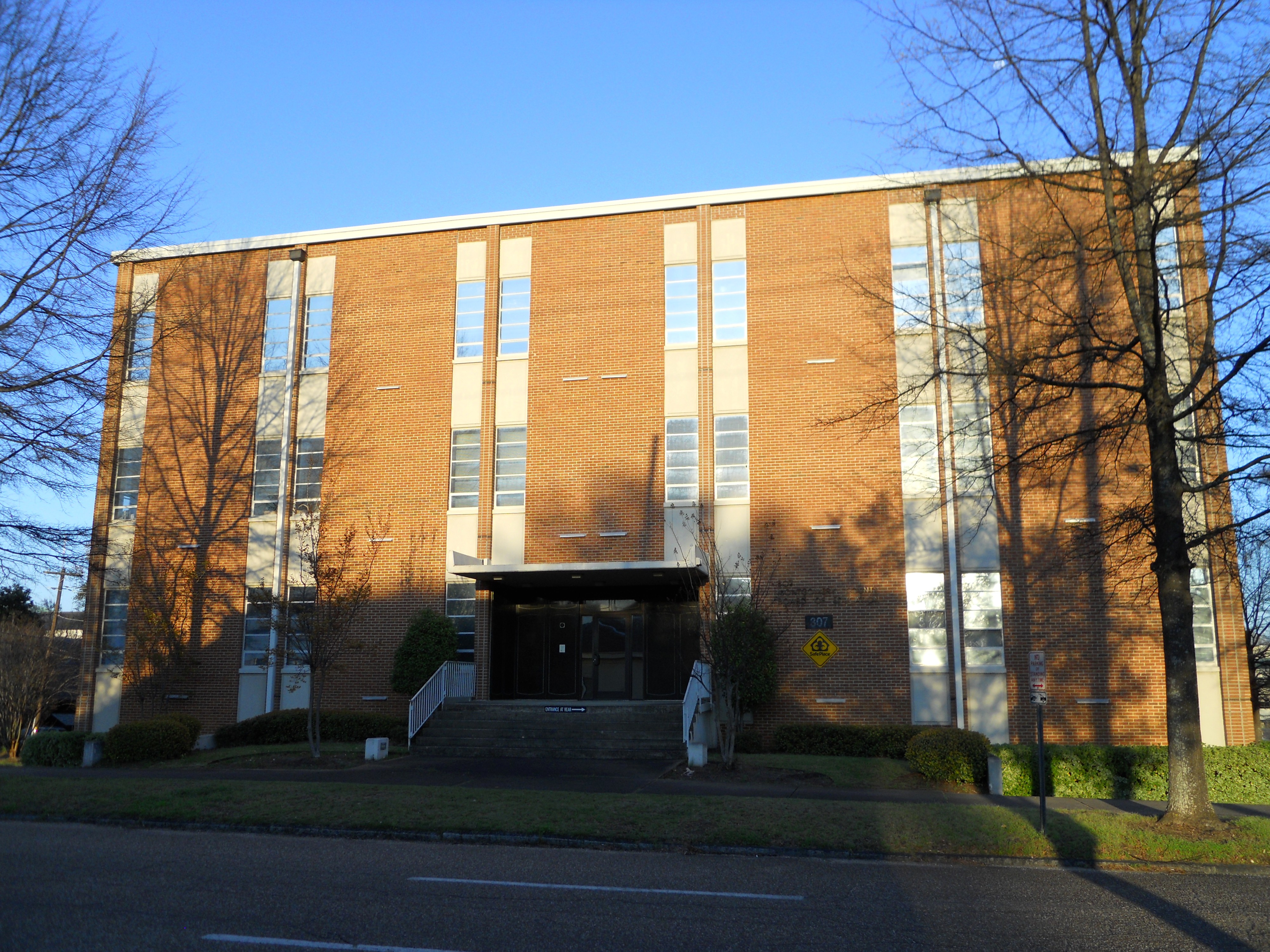
The Montgomery Public Schools headquarters and Montgomery County Board of Education is located at 307 S. Decatur Street in Montgomery.

Montgomery Public Schools operates public schools serving most of the county. However, Pike Road City School District operates public schools in Pike Road. Additionally Maxwell Air Force Base is zoned to Department of Defense Education Activity (DoDEA) schools. The DoDEA operates Maxwell Air Force Base Elementary/Middle School. For high school Maxwell AFB residents are zoned to Montgomery Public Schools facilities.

The Montgomery City-County Public Library operates public libraries.

Universities/Colleges include:

- Huntingdon College
- Faulkner University
- Alabama State University
- Auburn University Montgomery
- Virginia College
- Amridge University
- H. Council Trenholm Tech
- United States Air War College
- Troy University at Montgomery

== Cultural sites ==
Montgomery County is home to many cultural and historic sites including:

- Alabama Shakespeare Festival
- Montgomery Museum of Fine Arts
- Montgomery Zoo
- Dexter Avenue Baptist Church
- Museum of Alabama (Alabama Department of Archives and History)
- Alabama State Capitol
- W. A. Gayle Planetarium
- Civil Rights Memorial
- First White House of the Confederacy
- Zelda and F. Scott Fitzgerald Museum
- Old Montgomery Greyhound Bus Station (Freedom Rides Museum)
- Rosa Parks Library and Museum

== Communities ==
=== City ===
- Montgomery (county seat and largest municipality)

=== Town ===
- Hope Hull
- Pike Road

=== Unincorporated communities ===
- Ada
- Boylston- now part of Montgomery.
- Carter Hill
- Cecil
- Currys
- Dublin
- Grady
- Lapine (partly in Crenshaw County)
- Le Grand
- Mathews
- McDade
- Mount Meigs
- Pine Level
- Pintlala
- Ramer
- Red Level
- Snowdoun
- Waugh

== See also ==
- National Register of Historic Places listings in Montgomery County, Alabama
- Properties on the Alabama Register of Landmarks and Heritage in Montgomery County, Alabama
