= Montgomery City-County Public Library =

Library system in Alabama, United States

- Location: Montgomery, Alabama, United States of America
- Established: 1889
- Branches: 11

Access and use
- Circulation: 435,500 (2012)
- Population served: 224,000 (2012)

Other information
- Director: Zella'Ques Holmes
- Website: http://www.mccpl.lib.al.us/

The Montgomery City-County Public Library is a library system of eleven branches serving the citizens of Montgomery County, Alabama. The system is composed of the Juliette Hampton Morgan Memorial Library and ten other branches.

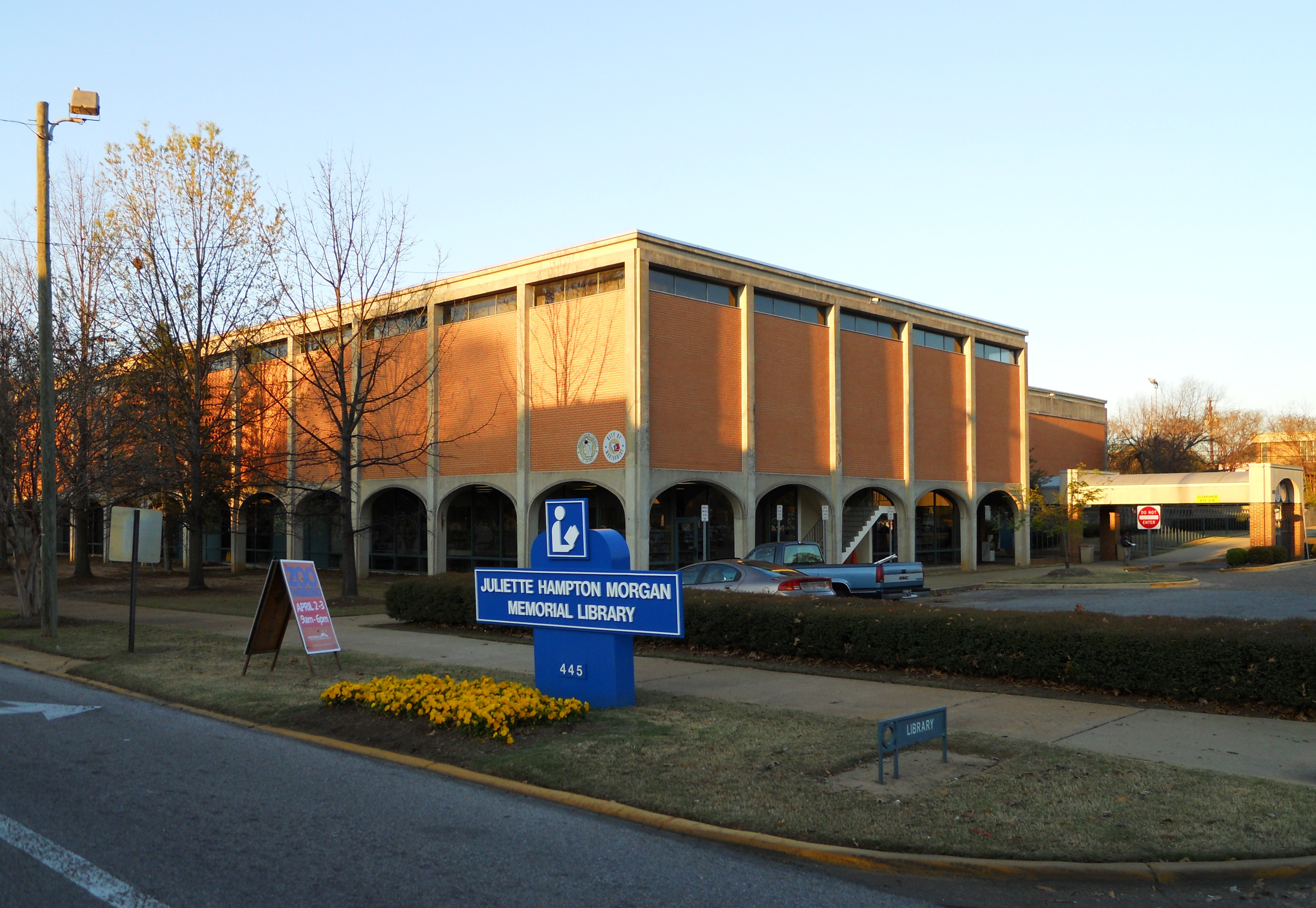
The Juliette Hampton Morgan Memorial Library

== History ==
=== Montgomery Library Association ===
Library service began on June 19, 1899, when a collection was started above McBryde's Drugstore on Dexter Avenue. Funds were gathered largely from a promotion by the Montgomery Advertiser. The Montgomery Library Association was by subscription membership of $1.00 Miss Laura M. Elmore was the city's first librarian.

Future Vision

the founders of said institution have ever had in mind not a subscription or private library, but an institution that might become a free means of culture and inspiration to all the classes and factions of our people.

— from the first constitution of the Montgomery Library Association, 1898.

==== Carnegie Library ====
First free public library in Montgomery. Laying of the cornerstone took place in 1902. Holdings included about 2,000 books in 1904. By December 25, 1910, the library's holdings had increased to 10,000 with 5,000 registered borrowers.

=== City of Montgomery Library ===
On April 5, 1949 the library became managed by the City of Montgomery with the transferral of its deeds and property from the Montgomery Library Association.

=== Montgomery City-County Public Library System ===
In 1974 the City and County Public library systems merged to become the Montgomery City-County Public Library System. The city retained full management responsibility over the system.

== Governance ==
The Montgomery City-County Public Library is governed by the Library Board of Trustees.

== Services ==
=== Collections ===
- Alabamiana & Rare Book Collection
- Arms & Military Collection
- Descriptive Video Collection

=== eBook & eMagazine Services ===
The Montgomery City-County Public Library offers the following audiobook, e-book, and eMagazine services:

- OverDrive eBooks & eAudiobooks

== Branches ==
- E L Lowder Regional Library
- Rufus A. Lewis Regional Library (named after Rufus A. Lewis (1906-1999), an American civil rights activist and politician)
- Coliseum Boulevard Branch Library
- Governors Square Branch Library
- Bertha Pleasant Williams Library — Rosa L. Parks Avenue Branch (named after Bertha Pleasant Williams (1923–2008), the first black professional librarian in Montgomery)
- Pintlala Branch Library
- Extension Service & Outreach Department
- Hampstead Library
- Pike Road Branch Library
- Pine Level Branch Library - Closed in 2015
- Ramer Branch Library
