= Ada, Alabama =

- Unincorporated community
- Location within Alabama Location within the United States
- Coordinates: 32°06′20″N 86°16′35″W
- Country: United States
- State: Alabama
- County: Montgomery
- Elevation: 322 ft (98 m)
- Time zone: UTC-6 (Central (CST))
  - Summer (DST): UTC-5 (CDT)
- Area code: 334
- GNIS feature ID: 112911

Ada is an unincorporated community in Montgomery County, Alabama, United States. Ada is located at the intersection of U.S. Route 331 and Alabama State Route 94, 20 miles (32 km) south of Montgomery.

== History ==
A post office operated under the name Ada from 1881 to 1922. Ada was the name of the first postmaster's wife.

== Demographics ==
According to the census returns from 1850–2010 for Alabama, it has never reported a population figure separately on the U.S. Census.
