= Waugh, Alabama =

- Unincorporated community
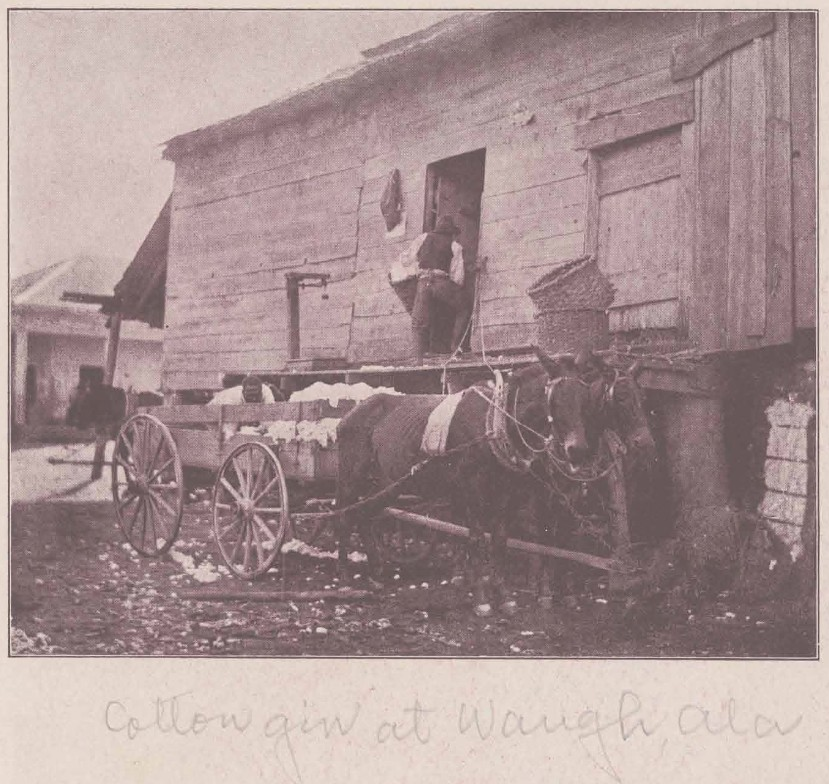
- Cotton gin in Waugh in 1900 photographed by Rudolf Eickemeyer Jr.

- Location within Alabama Location within the United States
- Coordinates: 32°21′55″N 86°02′42″W
- Country: United States
- State: Alabama
- County: Montgomery
- Elevation: 269 ft (82 m)
- Time zone: UTC-6 (Central (CST))
  - Summer (DST): UTC-5 (CDT)
- Area code: 334
- GNIS feature ID: 128654

Waugh is an unincorporated community in Montgomery County, Alabama, United States, located at the intersection of U.S. Route 80 and Alabama State Route 126, 15.3 miles (24.6 km) east of Montgomery.

== History ==
A post office operated under the name Waugh from 1893 to 1956.

Waugh was formerly the home of the Montgomery County Training School, which taught African American boys and girls agricultural and homemaking skills.

Waugh is located along the route of the Federal Road and was formerly the site of the Lucas Tavern. Lucas Tavern was originally located west of Line Creek, which marked the original boundary between Mississippi Territory and the Creek Nation. The tavern was first opened by James Abercrombie, but Walter B. Lucas began operating it in 1821. A historical marker denotes the original site of the tavern, but the tavern was moved to Old Alabama Town in 1978 and serves as the visitor and information center. In April 1825, General Lafayette stayed the night at the tavern on his way to Montgomery.

== Notable person ==
- Samuel Plato, architect
