= Orion, Alabama =

- Unincorporated community
- Location within Alabama Location within the United States
- Coordinates: 31°57′32″N 86°00′20″W
- Country: United States
- State: Alabama
- County: Pike
- Elevation: 561 ft (171 m)
- Time zone: UTC-6 (Central (CST))
  - Summer (DST): UTC-5 (CDT)
- Area code: 334
- GNIS feature ID: 152820

Orion, also known as Prospect Ridge, is an unincorporated community in Pike County, Alabama, United States, located 12.9 miles (20.8 km) north of Troy.

== History ==
Originally called Prospect Ridge, the name was changed to Orion in honor of the constellation. Orion was incorporated on February 4, 1850, and the charter was repealed by the Alabama Legislature on February 26, 1881. A post office operated under the name Prospect Ridge from 1838 to 1848 and under the name Orion from 1848 to 1903.

Orion was home to the Orion Institute, one of the earliest schools in Pike County.

Jim Capers, the first African-American Revolutionary War soldier known to be buried in Alabama, is buried at Bethlehem Missionary Baptist Church in Orion.

Multiple structures in Orion were documented in the Historic American Buildings Survey.

== Notable people ==
- C. S. Yarbrough - American politician

== Gallery ==
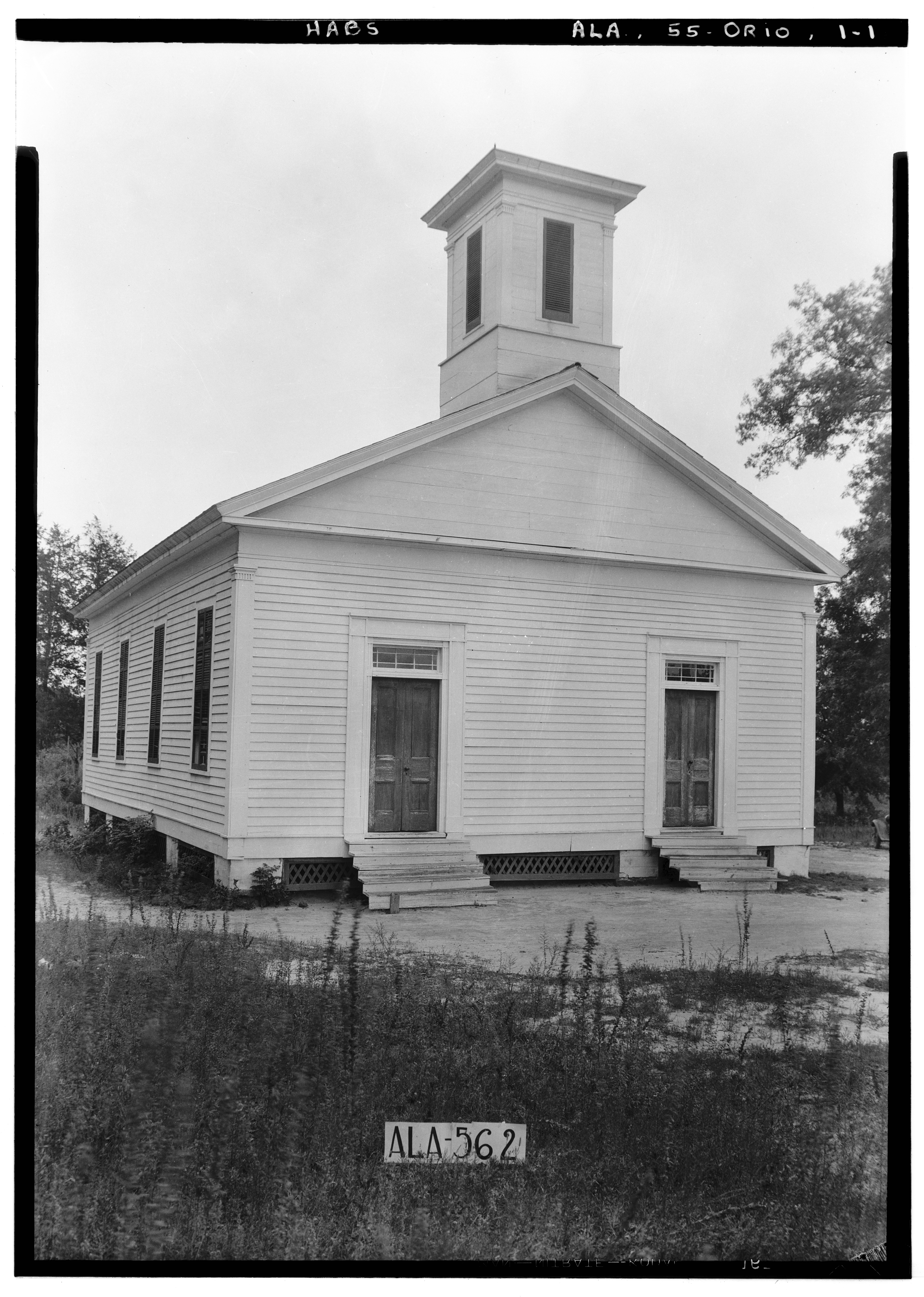
Baptist Church

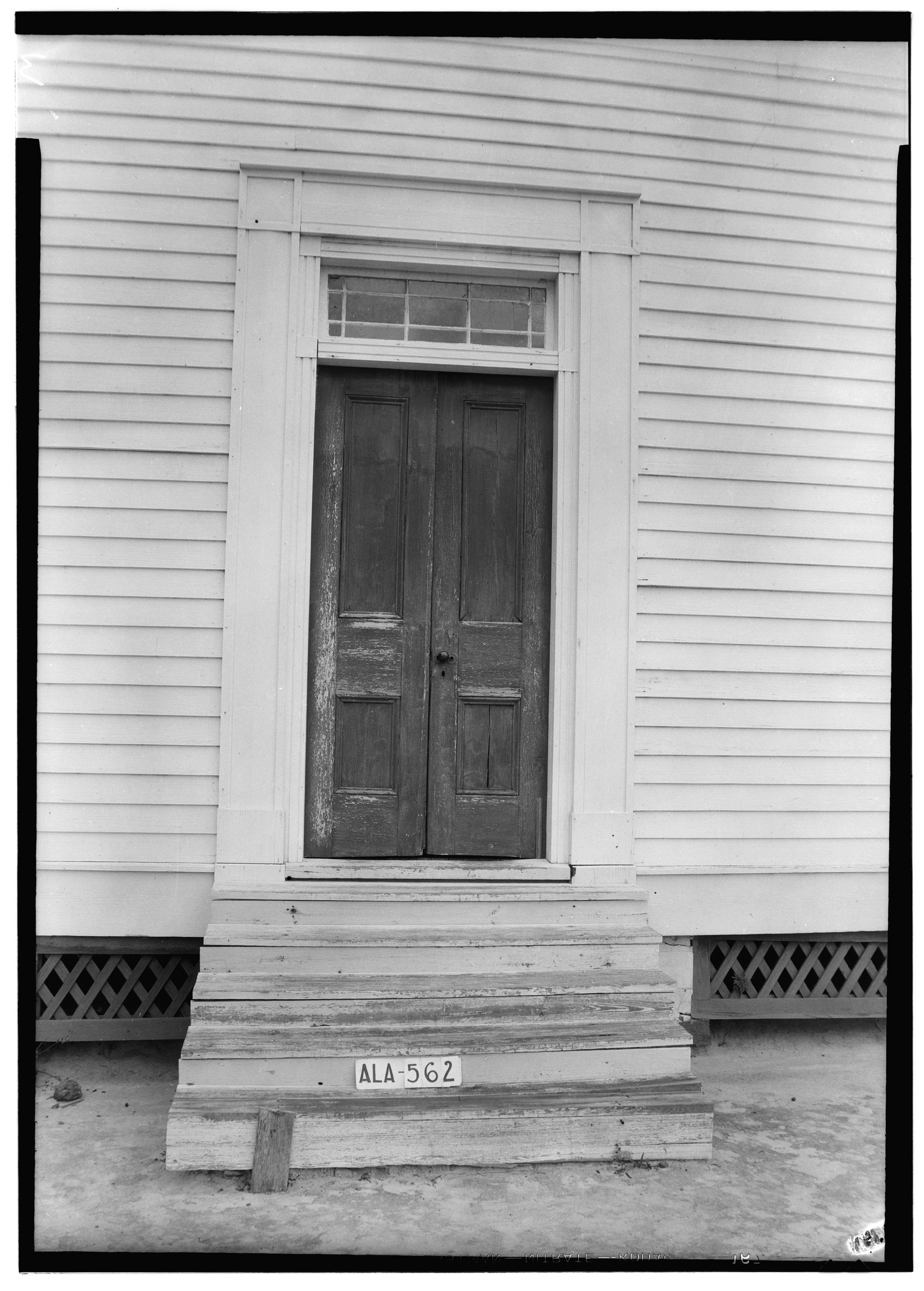
Front door of Baptist Church

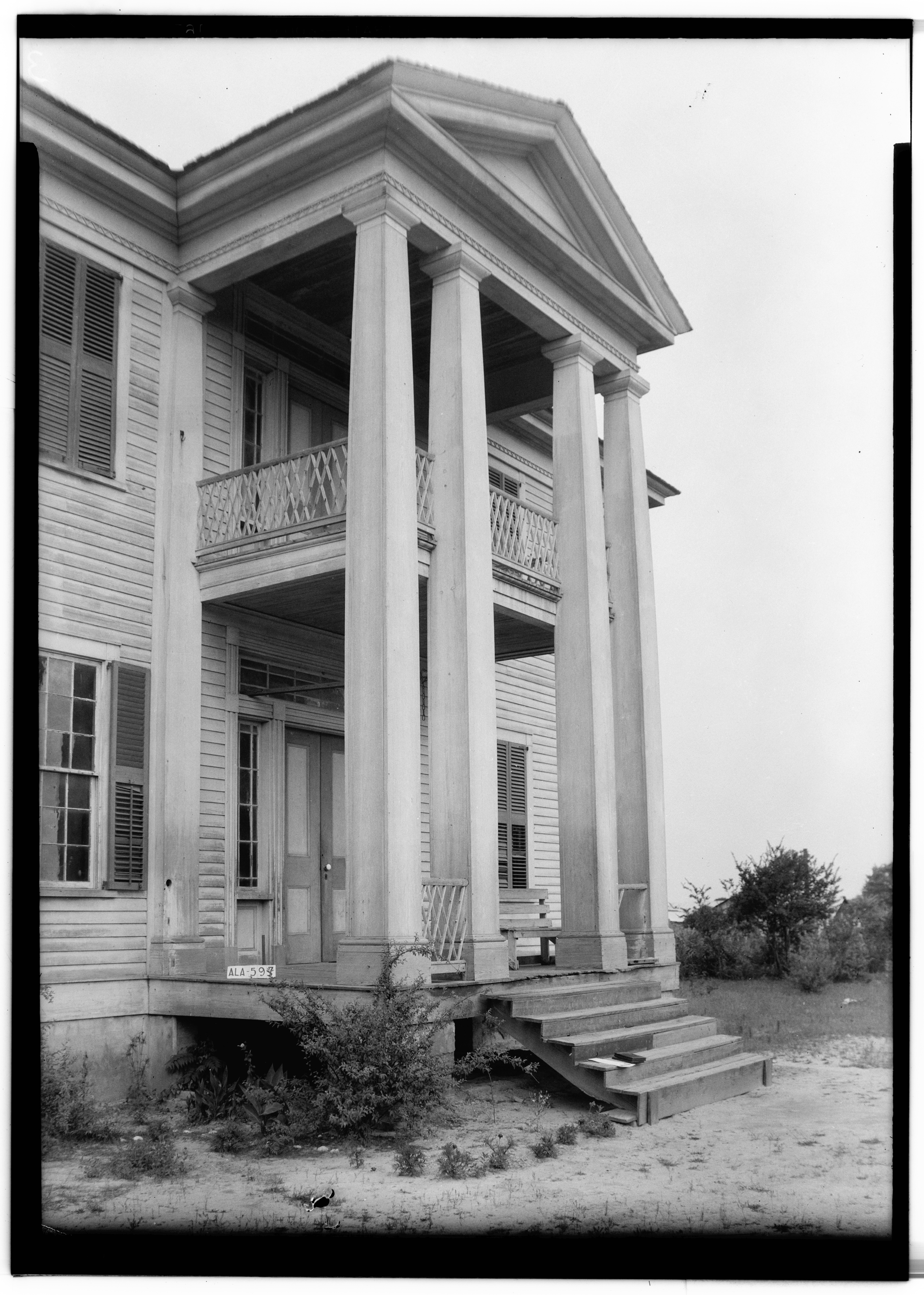
Solomon Siler House front porch

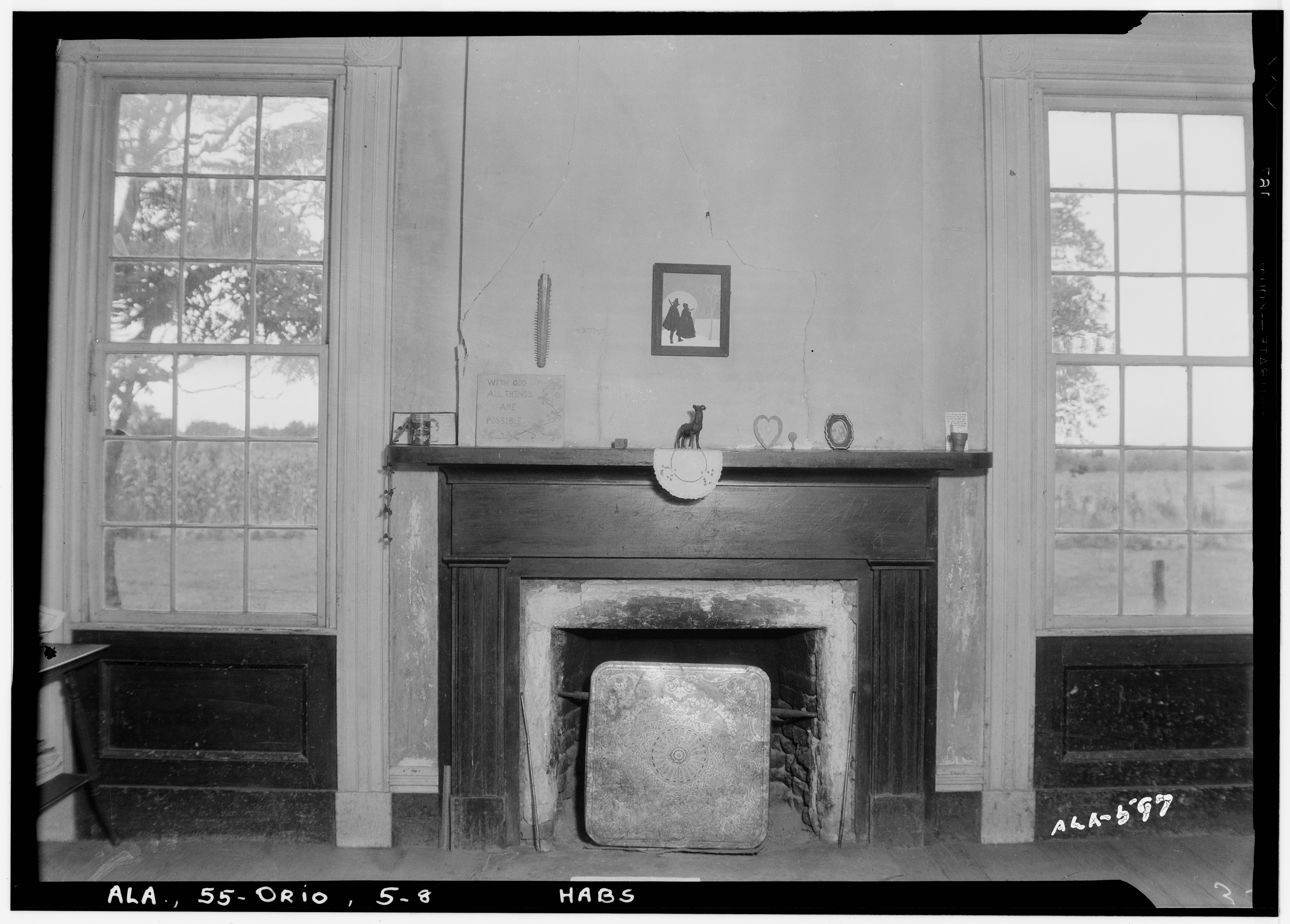
Solomon Siler House bedroom

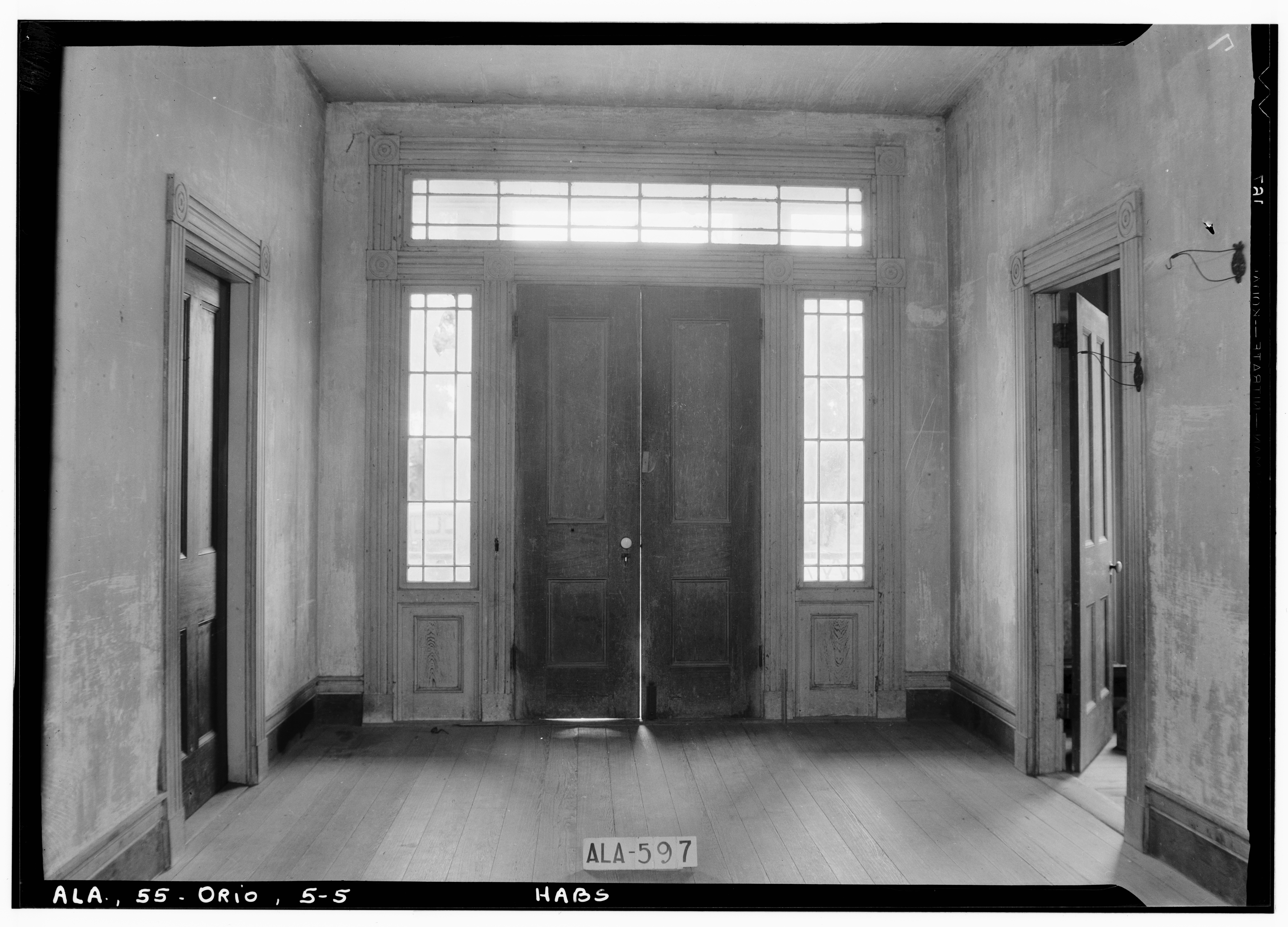
Solomon Siler House foyer

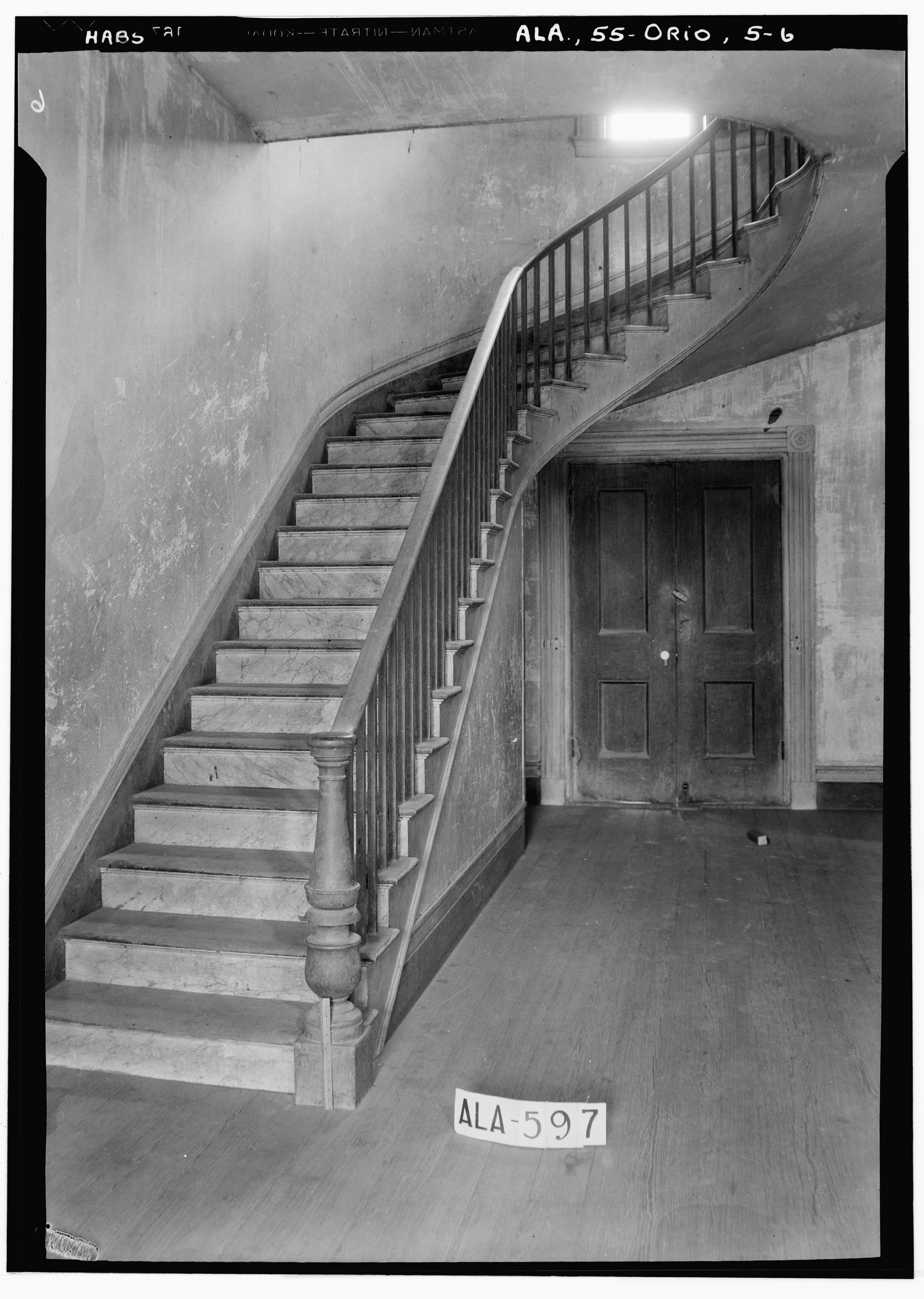
Solomon Siler House stairway

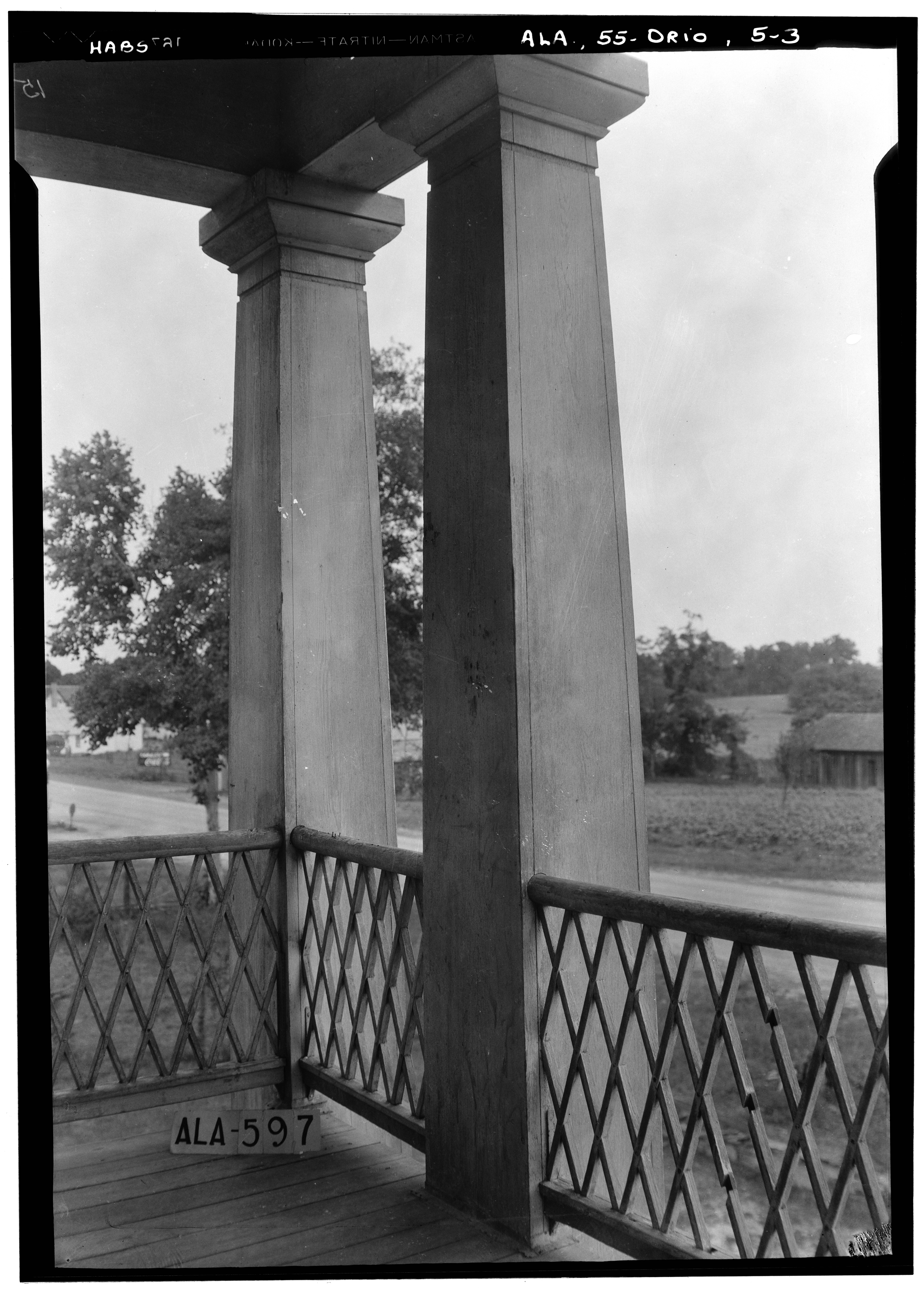
Solomon Siler House columns

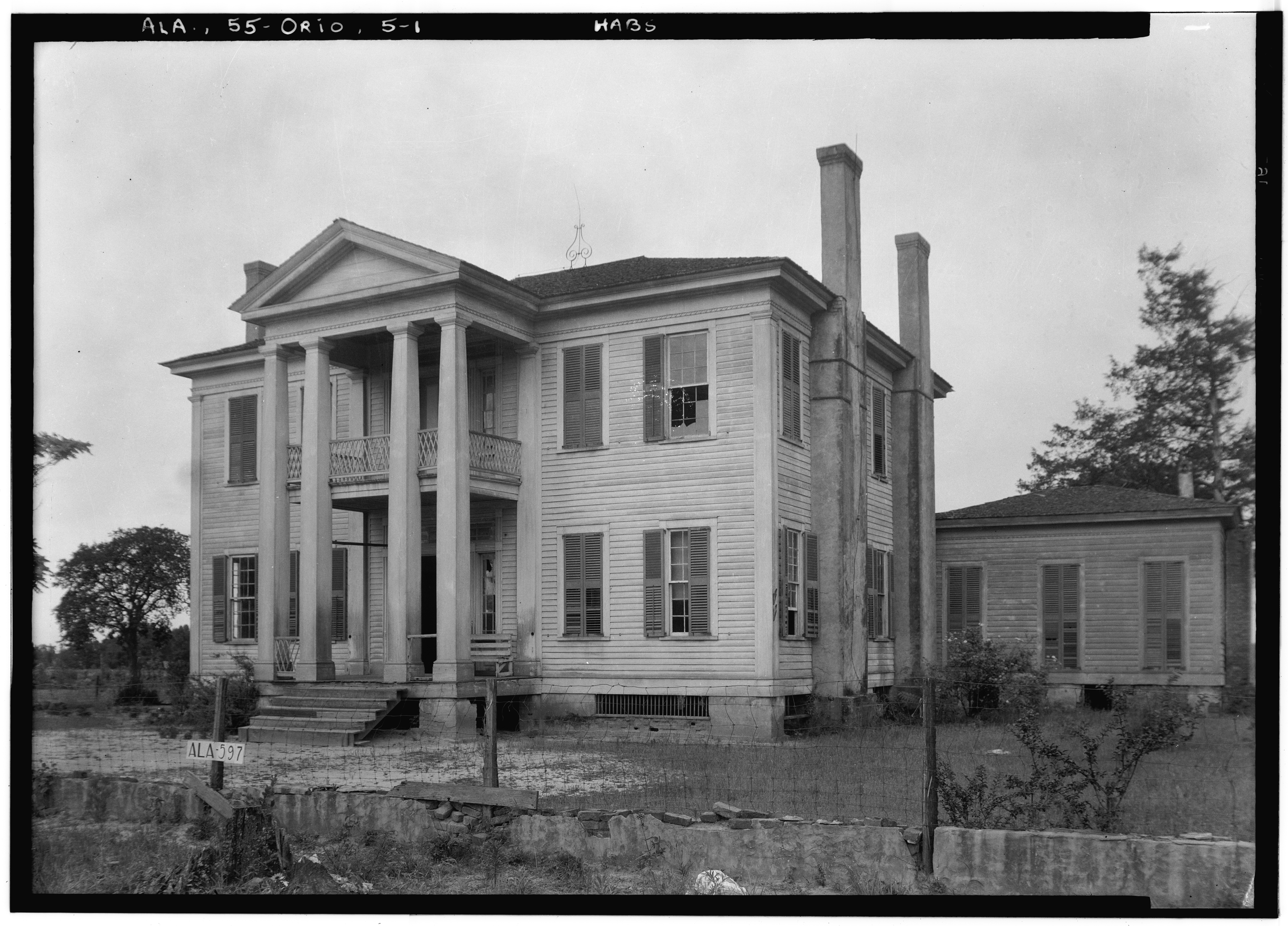
Solomon Siler House

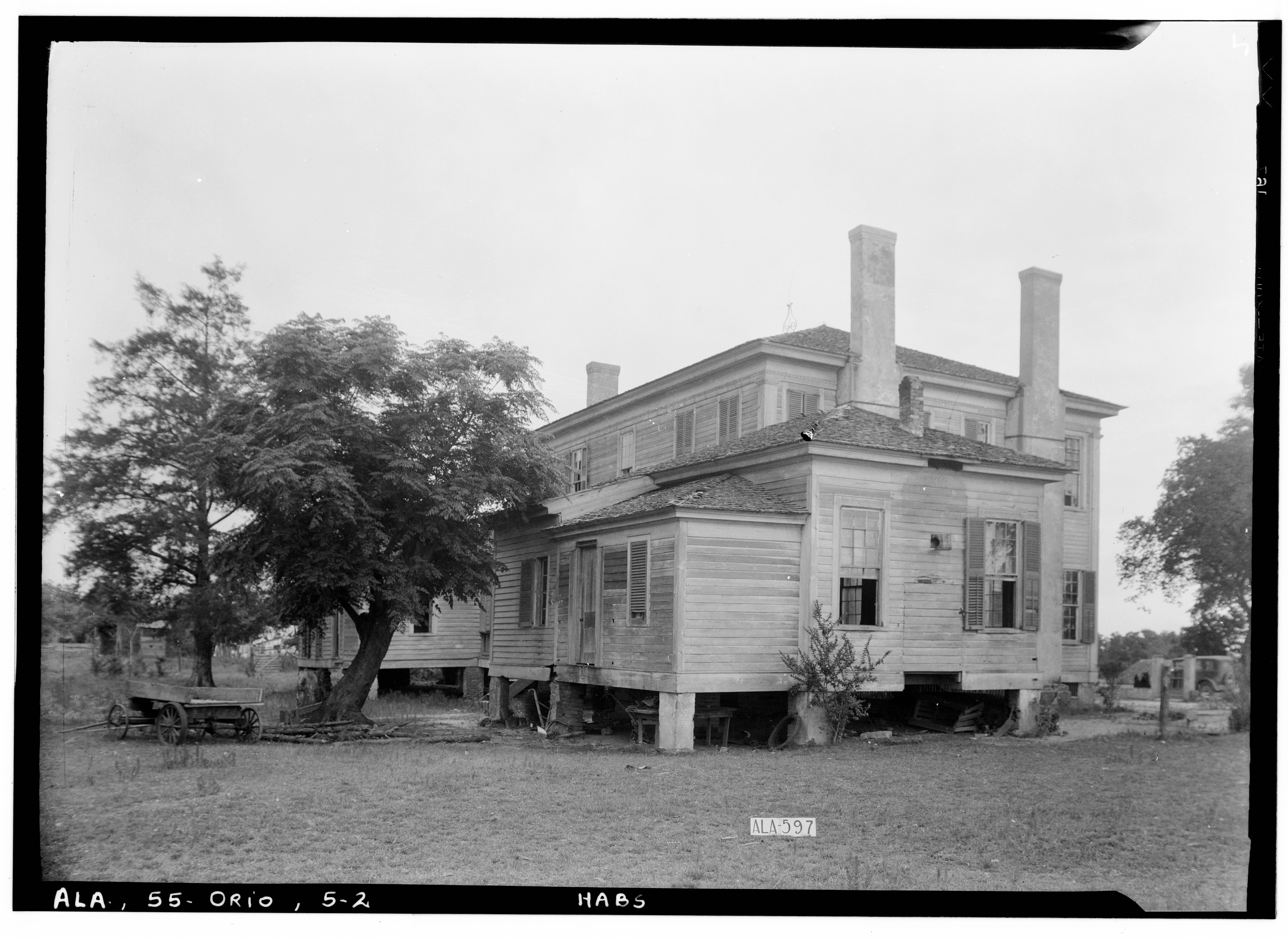
Solomon Siler House

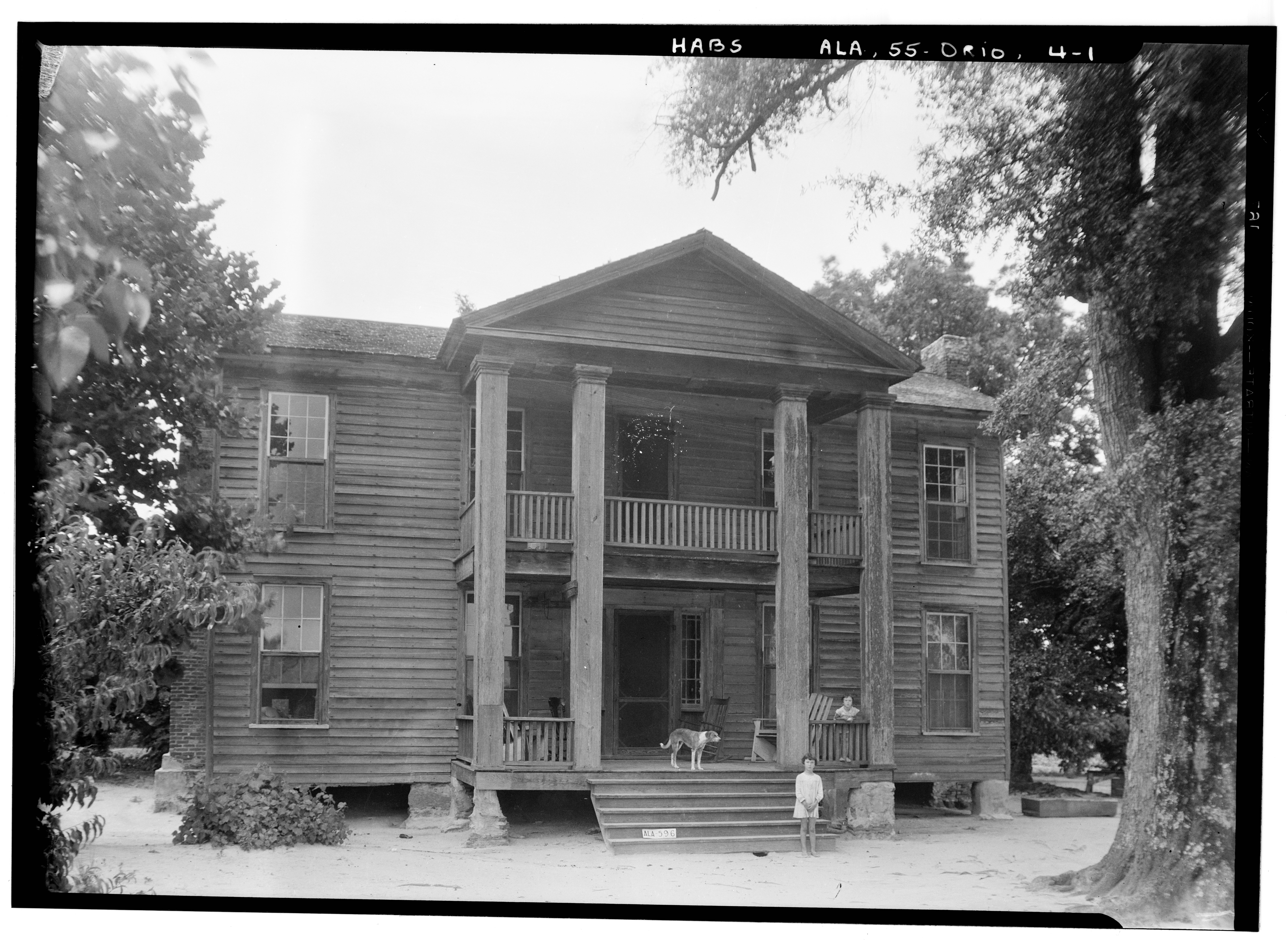
McCullough-Henderson House

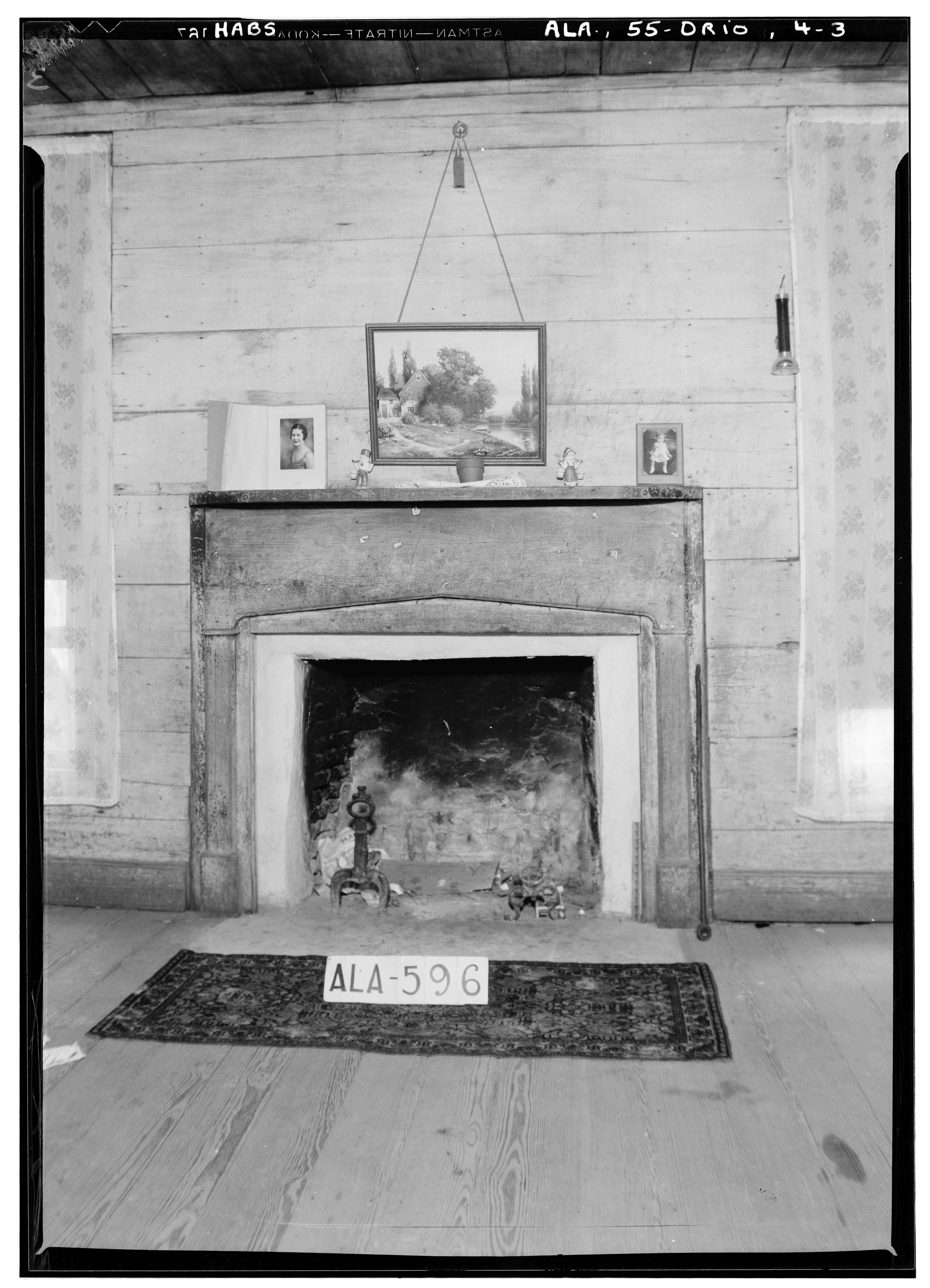
McCullough-Henderson House fireplace

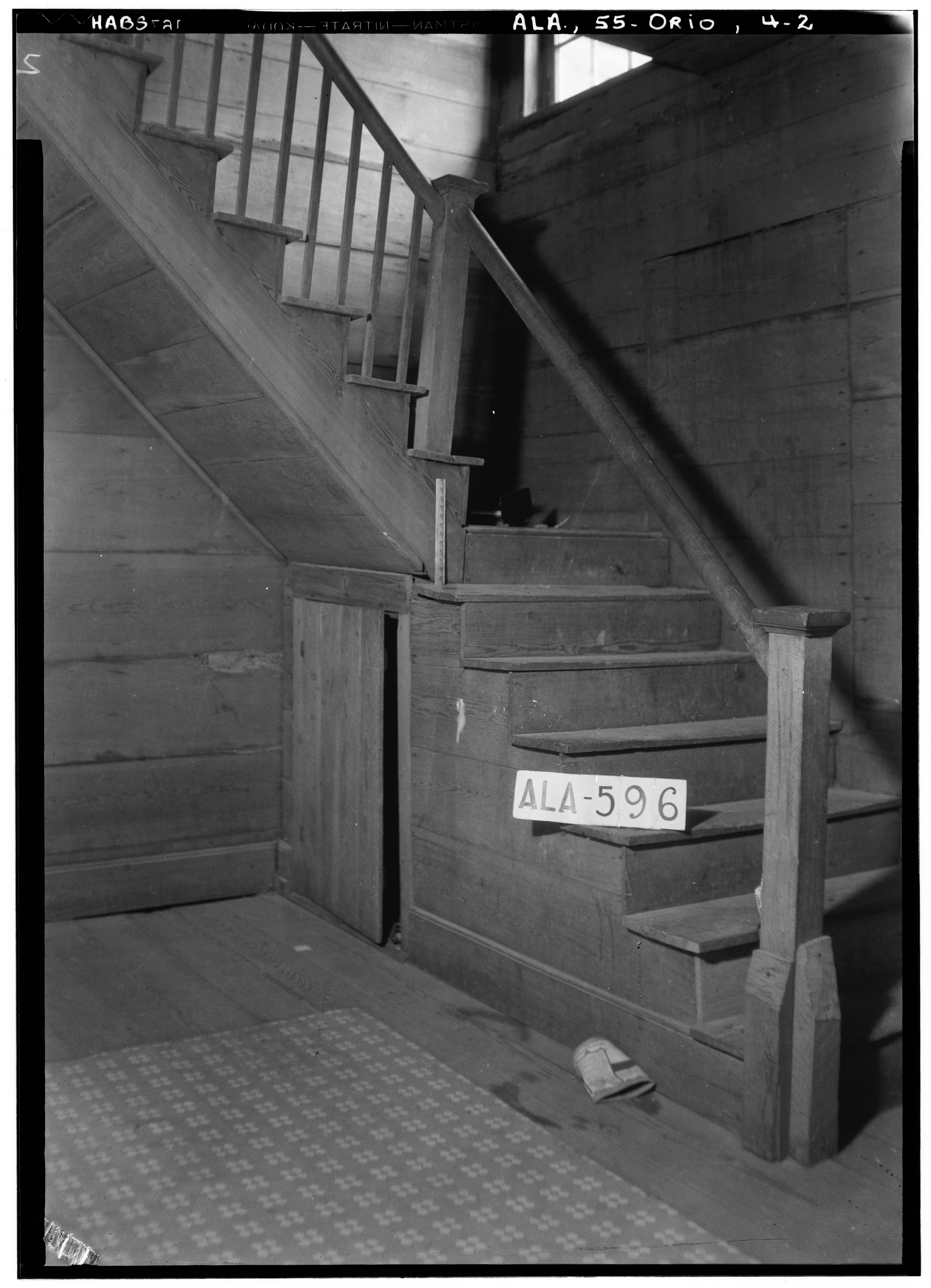
McCullough-Henderson House stairway

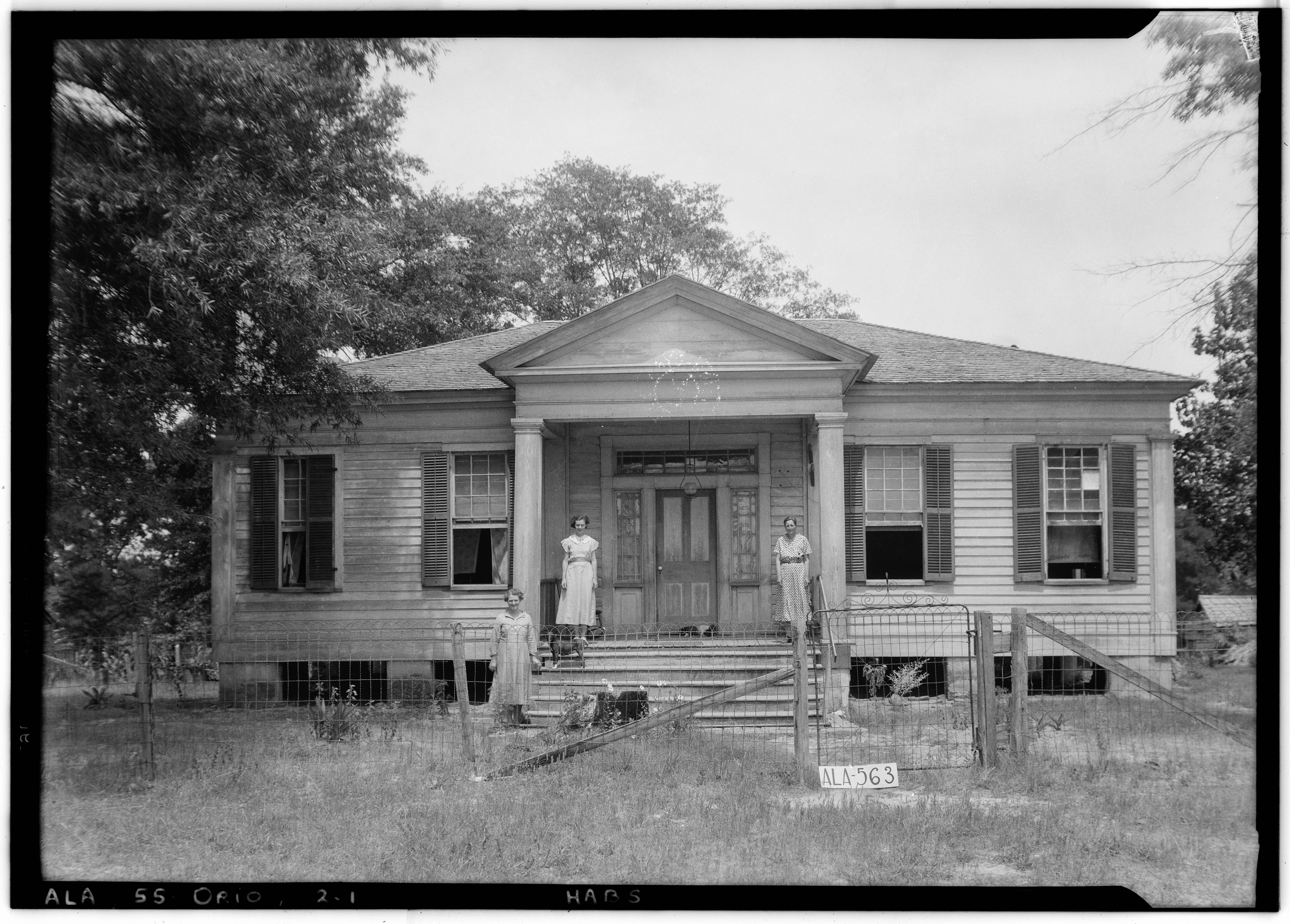
Hanchey-Pennington House

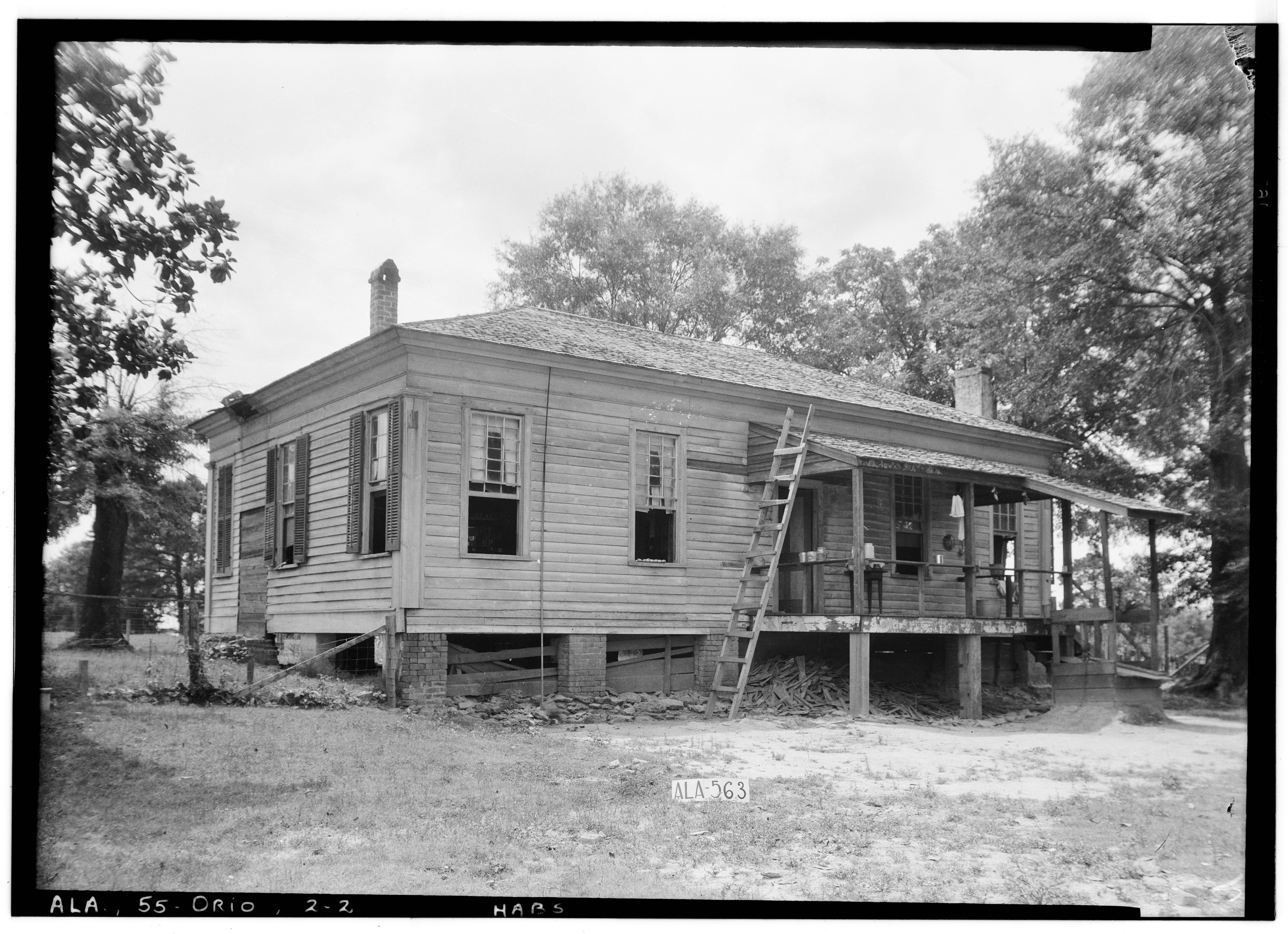
Hanchey-Pennington House rear

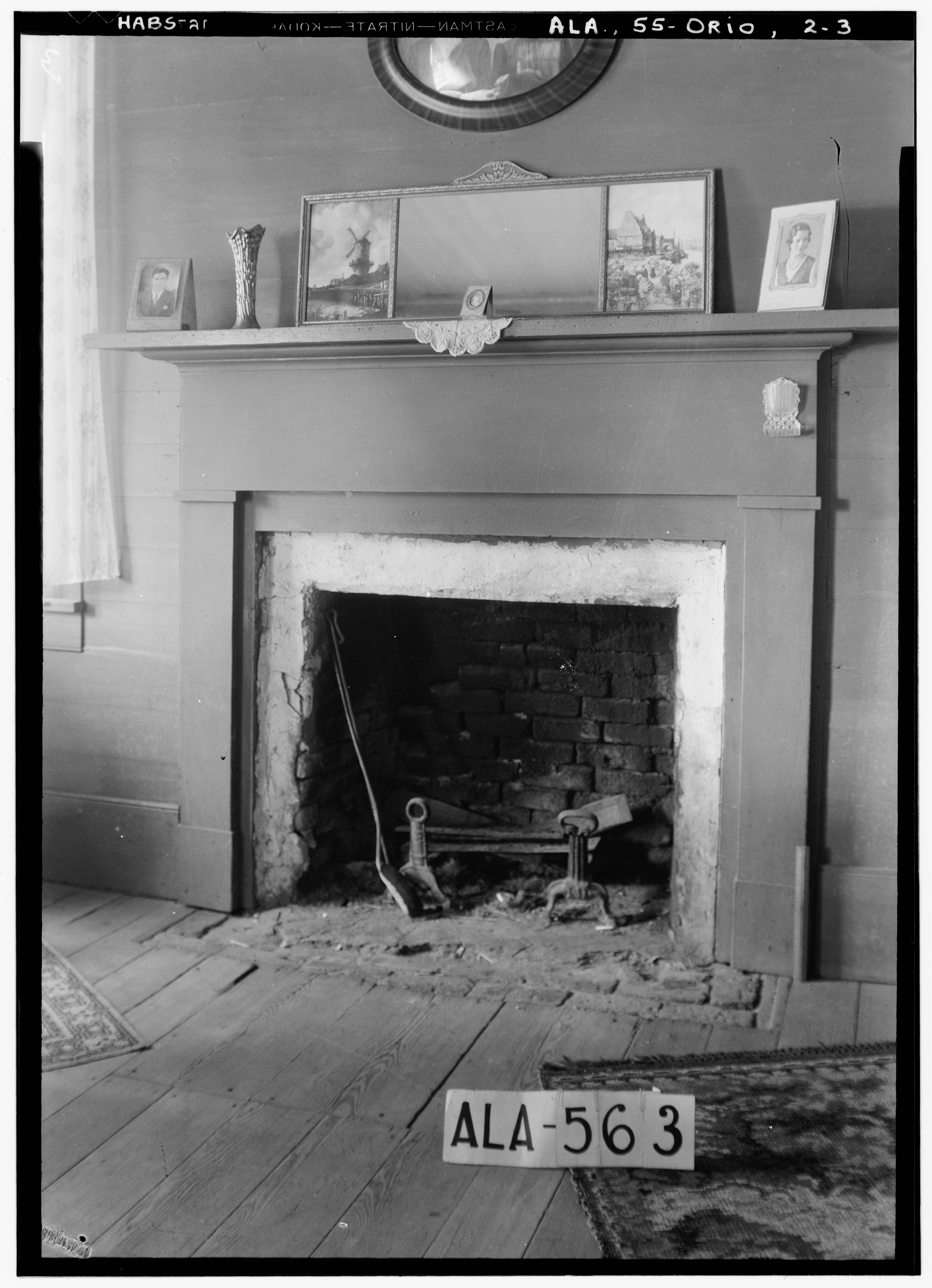
Hanchey-Pennington House fireplace

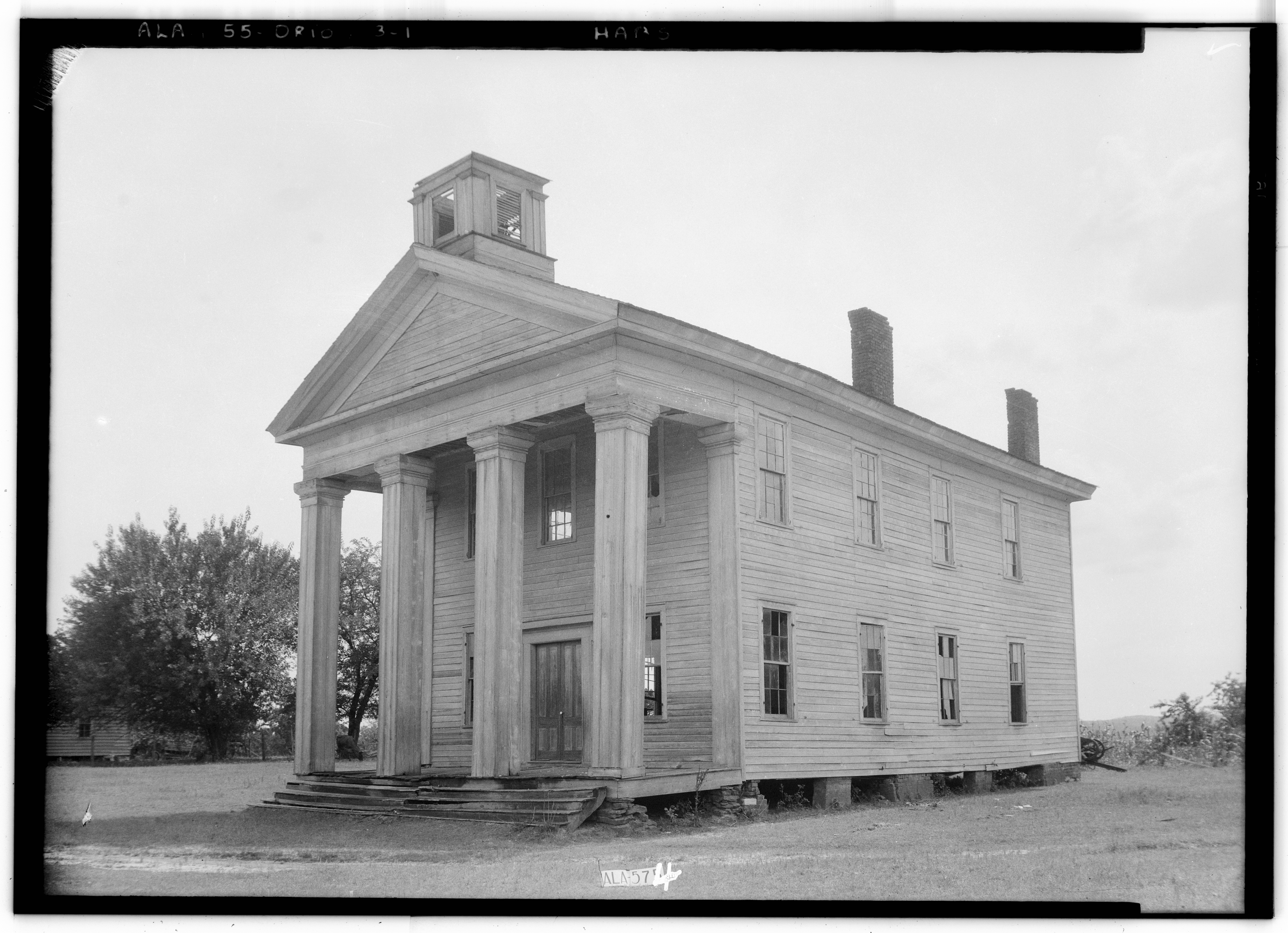
Orion Male and Female Institute

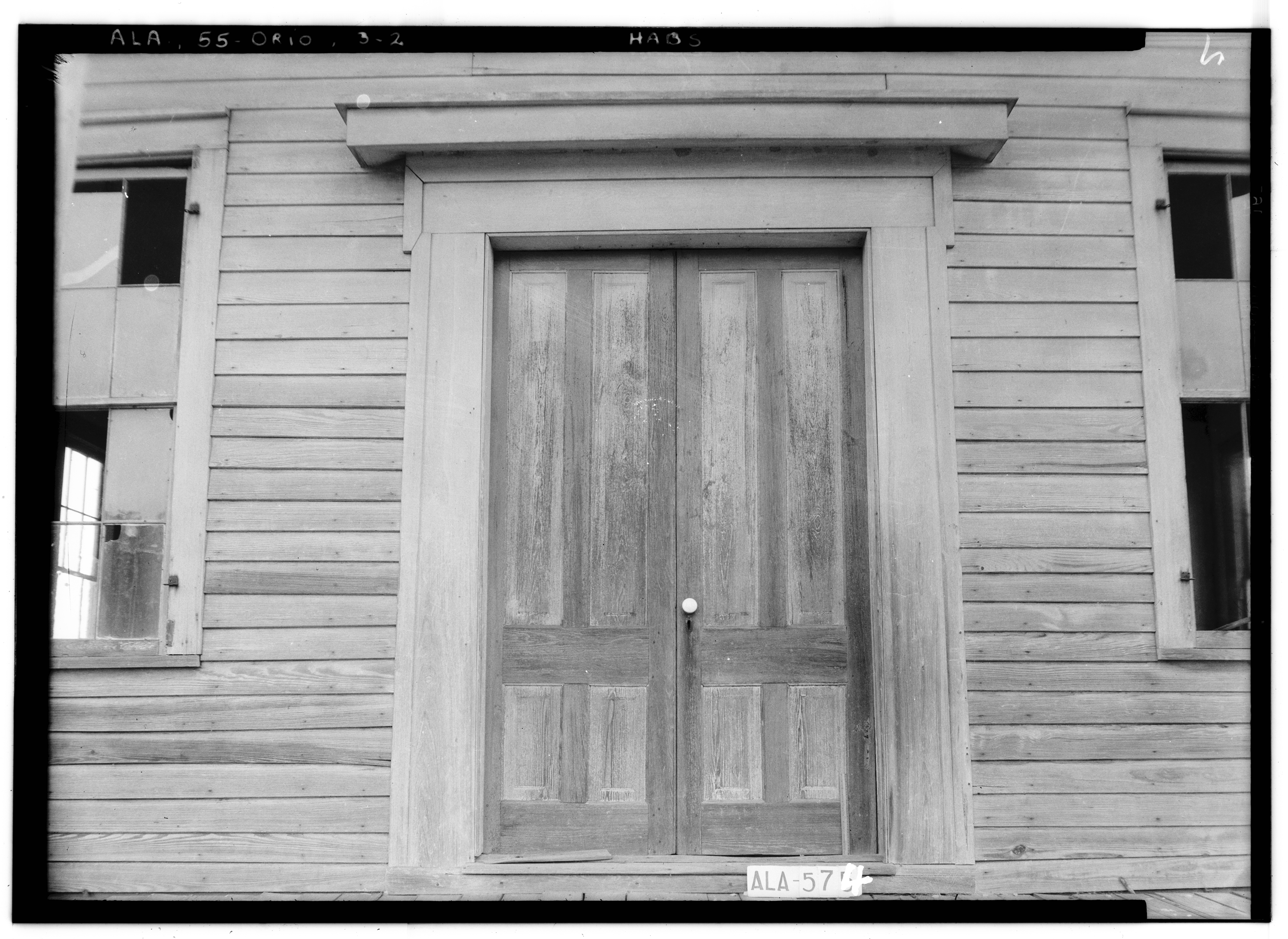
Orion Male and Female Institute front door
