= Cecil, Alabama =

- Unincorporated community
- Location within Alabama Location within the United States
- Coordinates: 32°18′10″N 86°00′31″W
- Country: United States
- State: Alabama
- County: Montgomery
- Elevation: 239 ft (73 m)
- Time zone: UTC-6 (Central (CST))
  - Summer (DST): UTC-5 (CDT)
- ZIP code: 36013
- Area code: 334
- GNIS feature ID: 115733

Cecil is an unincorporated community in Montgomery County, Alabama, United States. Cecil is located on Alabama State Route 110, 17.6 miles (28.3 km) east-southeast of Montgomery. Cecil had a post office until it closed on May 20, 1986; it still has its own ZIP code, 36013.

== Education ==
Macon East Academy, a private PK-12 school, serves Cecil as well as Montgomery Public Schools.
