= Macon East Academy =

Segregation academy in Alabama

Location
- Cecil, Alabama; 32.3024391°N 86.0145863°W

Information
- Former name: Macon Academy (1963-1995) Macon-East Montgomery Academy (1995-2011)
- Type: Private
- Established: September 1963
- NCES School ID: 00002835
- Faculty: 26.3
- Enrollment: 287 (2016)
- Campus type: Rural
- Team name: Knights
- Website: maconeast.net

Macon East Academy is a private PK-12 school in Cecil, Alabama. It was established as a segregation academy in response to the racial desegregation of public schools and serves 287 students.

== History ==
Macon Academy was founded in September 1963 in Tuskegee, Alabama (32.3743789,-85.6599105), seat of Macon County. The school was a segregation academy. Under the direction of Governor George Wallace, the state provided scholarship money to support the school. In 1964, the school had a policy of allowing all white students to attend, regardless of their ability to pay tuition. However, Macon Academy declined to process applications from seven black families on the grounds that the school had exhausted its supply of admissions forms.

In 1995, in the midst of falling enrollments, the trustees moved the school to Cecil, Alabama, a suburb of Montgomery.

== Campus ==
The campus, twenty miles east of Montgomery in a rural area, includes five buildings and outdoor athletic facilities.
