= Ramer, Alabama =

- Unincorporated community
- Location within Alabama Location within the United States
- Coordinates: 32°03′02″N 86°13′17″W
- Country: United States
- State: Alabama
- County: Montgomery
- Elevation: 469 ft (143 m)
- Time zone: UTC-6 (Central (CST))
  - Summer (DST): UTC-5 (CDT)
- ZIP code: 36069
- Area code: 334
- GNIS feature ID: 153107

Ramer, also known as Athens, is an unincorporated community located in Montgomery County, Alabama, United States. The elevation is 469 feet (143 m). The community is located 23.9 miles (38.5 km) from the city of Montgomery.

== History ==
Ramer was originally known as Athens. When the town applied for a post office, Athens was already in use by a city in Alabama. Instead, the community became known as Ramer, which is the name of a nearby creek. A post office opened under the name Ramer in 1851.

== Notable people ==
- Joe Caffie, former outfielder for the Cleveland Indians
- Oscar Gamble, former Major League Baseball outfielder and designated hitter
