= Bertha Pleasant Williams =

American librarian

Bertha Pleasant Williams

Bertha Pleasant Williams (1923–2008) was the first African American professional librarian in Montgomery, Alabama, United States. In 1948 the segregated city required a certified librarian as a prerequisite to open a library for the city's African American residents. Williams, who had recently graduated from Atlanta University, took the position, established the Union Street Library, and worked in libraries for most of her life.

== Life and career ==
Williams was born June 29, 1923, in Montgomery, Alabama. She was one of seven children of Mary Green Pleasant and Reuben P. Pleasant. Williams earned a bachelor's degree in library science from Alabama State University in 1943, and a master's degree in library science from Atlanta University in 1946. Soon after her graduation city officials approached Williams about opening a library, and she accepted the position. Williams opened the branch of the city library in two rooms of a house at 409 S. Union Street. Williams spent much of her professional life in the Montgomery Library System, and worked in the library field for fifty years. Williams died November 24, 2008.

Williams worked at Alabama State University Library for fourteen years, and served as Head of the rare Book Collection and archives for seven of those years.

Williams met Robert H. Williams at Alabama State University, and the two married in 1950. They had one son, Richard Williams.

== Honors ==
In 2012, the Montgomery City Council voted to rename the Rosa Parks Library branch to the Bertha Pleasant-Williams Library at the Rosa Parks Avenue Branch. The branch opened in 1960, and was the second library in the system to serve blacks. Williams became the head librarian when the branch opened, and worked there for nine years.
