= Alabama State Route 110 =

State highway in Alabama, United States

State Route 110

Route information
- Maintained by ALDOT
- Length: 32.257 mi (51.913 km)
- Existed: 1963–present

Major junctions
- West end: SR 126 in Montgomery
- Future I-85 / SR 108 southeast of Mount Meigs; SR 293 southeast of Mount Meigs
- East end: US 82 west of Union Springs

Location
- Country: United States
- State: Alabama

Highway system
- Alabama State Highway System; Interstate; US; State
← SR 109	→ SR 111

State Route 110 (SR 110) is a 32.257-mile-long (51.913 km) state highway in the central part of the U.S. state of Alabama. The western terminus of the highway is at an intersection with SR 126 within sight of the Interstate 85 (I-85) and U.S. Route 80 (US 80) interchange in the eastern part of Montgomery. The eastern terminus of the highway is at an intersection with US 82 west of Union Springs, Alabama.

== Route description ==
SR 110 begins at an intersection with SR 126 near the interchange with I-85/US 80 approximately 11 miles (18 km) east of downtown Montgomery. From its beginning, it heads southeast from Montgomery County into rural areas of that county. It has an incomplete interchange with SR 108 (which is the placeholder for the future re-routing of I-85 around Montgomery. It then has an intersection with the southern terminus of SR 293. It then enters Bullock County. Along its two-lane roadway, the highway travels through a number of small, unincorporated communities and farmland as it heads towards Union Springs. SR 110 reaches its eastern terminus approximately 2 miles (3.2 km) west of Union Springs, where motorists must then take US 82 (internally designated as SR 6).

== Major intersections ==
County	Location	mi	km	Destinations	Notes
Montgomery	Montgomery	0.000	0.000	SR 126 (Atlanta Highway)	Western terminus
Montgomery	Pike Road	7.076	11.388	SR 108 east	Interchange; western terminus of SR 108; future route of I-85
Montgomery		7.368	11.858	SR 293 north (Milly Creek Lane)	Southern terminus of SR 293
Bullock		32.357	52.074	US 82 (SR 6) – Union Springs, Pike Road, Eufaula	Eastern terminus
1.000 mi = 1.609 km; 1.000 km = 0.621 mi
