= National Register of Historic Places listings in Sumter County, Alabama =

Location of Sumter County in Alabama

This is a list of the National Register of Historic Places listings in Sumter County, Alabama.

This is intended to be a complete list of the properties and districts on the National Register of Historic Places in Sumter County, Alabama, United States. Latitude and longitude coordinates are provided for many National Register properties and districts; these locations may be seen together in an online map.

There are 14 properties and districts listed on the National Register in the county.

This National Park Service list is complete through NPS recent listings posted January 30, 2026.

== Current listings ==
	Name on the Register	Image	Date listed	Location	City or town	Description
1	Dr. James Alvis Beavers House	Dr. James Alvis Beavers House	August 31, 2000 (#00001025)	Old Livingston Rd. 32°26′20″N 88°21′43″W	Cuba	
2	Coffin Shop	Coffin Shop	October 29, 1985 (#85002930)	McKee and Monroe Sts. 32°49′18″N 88°09′30″W	Gainesville	
3	Colgin Hill		October 3, 1985 (#85002924)	Off State Route 39; 32°48′40″N 88°09′20″W	Gainesville	
4	Federation of Southern Cooperatives Rural Training and Research Center	Federation of Southern Cooperatives Rural Training and Research Center	October 3, 2023 (#100009125)	575 Federation Rd. 32°45′19″N 88°07′34″W	Epes vicinity	
5	Fort Tombecbee	Fort Tombecbee	October 2, 1973 (#73000373)	Address Restricted	Epes	
6	Gainesville Historic District	Gainesville Historic District	October 3, 1985 (#85002925)	Roughly bounded by North Carolina, Church, School, and Lafayette Sts., end of the town grid, and Webster St. 32°49′01″N 88°09′26″W	Gainesville	
7	Gibbs House	Gibbs House	October 3, 1985 (#85002926)	Southwest of Spruce and Webster Sts. 32°48′47″N 88°09′53″W	Gainesville	
8	Main–Yankee Street Historic District	Main–Yankee Street Historic District	October 3, 1985 (#85002927)	Roughly bounded by Main, Washington, and School Sts. 32°49′21″N 88°09′21″W	Gainesville	
9	Col. Green G. Mobley House	Col. Green G. Mobley House	January 18, 1982 (#82002070)	Webster and Pearl Sts. 32°49′06″N 88°09′38″W	Gainesville	
10	Oakhurst	Oakhurst	January 6, 1987 (#86003563)	Gainesville-Lacy's Ford Rd., approximately 3 mi (4.8 km) southwest of State Route 116; 32°46′48″N 88°16′09″W	Emelle vicinity	
11	Park and Bandstand		October 29, 1985 (#85002929)	State and McKee Sts. 32°49′22″N 88°09′30″W	Gainesville	
12	Sumter County Courthouse	Sumter County Courthouse	March 24, 1972 (#72000180)	U.S. Route 11; 32°34′58″N 88°11′18″W	Livingston	
13	Dr. H. B. Ward House	Dr. H. B. Ward House	August 14, 1998 (#98001020)	202 4th Ave. 32°25′42″N 88°22′33″W	Cuba	
14	Laura Watson House		October 3, 1985 (#85002928)	Epes Rd. 32°48′52″N 88°09′11″W	Gainesville	Nonextant

== See also ==
- List of National Historic Landmarks in Alabama
- National Register of Historic Places listings in Alabama
