= Nimrod Snoddy =

Alabama priest and politician

Nimrod Snoddy (July 4, 1821 - May 16, 1886) was an A. M. E. preacher who served in the Alabama Legislature during the Reconstruction era. He was elected to the Alabama House of Representatives in 1876 representing Greene County, Alabama. He held substantial property in 1870 and was living in Greene County, Alabama.

He was African American and was active in the A. M. E. Church in Clinton, Alabama and as an elder preacher later in life.

== See also ==
- African American officeholders from the end of the Civil War until before 1900
