= Colonel Green G. Mobley House =

Historic house in Alabama, United States

- Col. Green G. Mobley House
- U.S. National Register of Historic Places
- U.S. Historic district – Contributing property
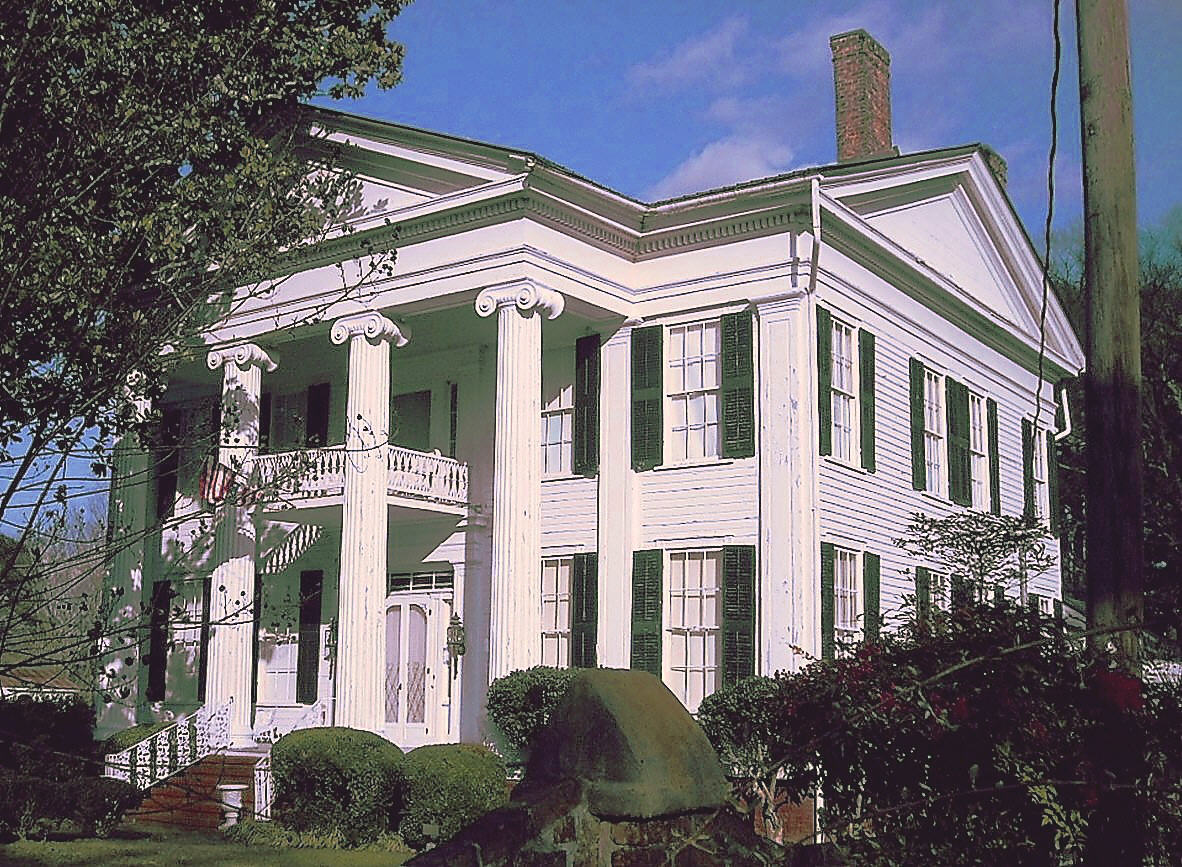

- Location within Alabama Location within the United States
- Location: Webster and Pearl Sts., Gainesville, Alabama
- Coordinates: 32°49′6″N 88°9′38″W
- Area: 3.3 acres (1.3 ha)
- Built: 1845
- Architectural style: Greek Revival
- Part of: Gainesville Historic District (ID85002925)
- NRHP reference No.: 82002070

Significant dates
- Added to NRHP: January 18, 1982
- Designated CP: October 3, 1985

The Colonel Green G. Mobley House, also known as The Magnolia, is a historic house in Gainesville, Alabama. The two-story wood-frame house was built for Colonel Green G. Mobley, a native of Fairfield County, South Carolina, and his wife Henrietta, a native of Vermont. The Greek Revival-style structure was completed circa 1845. Architectural historians consider it to be among West Alabama's most refined expressions of domestic Greek Revival architecture.

The house is centered on a 3.3-acre (1.3 ha) corner lot, surrounded by a high brick wall that is almost as old as the house itself. The front facade is five bays wide, with a monumental tetrastyle portico covering the central three bays. The bays are separated by boxed pilasters on the front. The portico is pedimented and utilizes the Ionic order. A denticulated cornice crowns the entablature around the entire structure. Exterior and interior trim conforms to published designs of Asher Benjamin and Minard Lafever, early proponents of the Greek Revival movement.

The house was added to the National Register of Historic Places on January 18, 1982.
