= Alabama State Route 116 =

State highway in Alabama, United States

State Route 116

Route information
- Maintained by ALDOT
- Length: 9.482 mi (15.260 km)
- Existed: 1963–present

Major junctions
- West end: SR 17 north of Emelle
- East end: SR 39 at Gainesville

Location
- Country: United States
- State: Alabama
- Counties: Sumter

Highway system
- Alabama State Highway System; Interstate; US; State
← SR 115	→ SR 117

State Route 116 (SR 116) is a 9.482-mile-long (15.260 km) state highway in Sumter County in the western part of the U.S. state of Alabama.

== Route description ==
Alabama State Route 116 begins at its intersection with State Route 17, north of Emelle, and runs as a two-lane highway. It connects the northern half of Sumter County with Greene County and passes through rural areas without crossing any towns until it reaches Gainesville, where it ends at an intersection with State Route 39.

== History ==
Established in 1963, it was created as a replacement for the former Sumter County Route 26. The route connects State Route 17 near the town of Emelle with State Route 39 in Gainesville, passing through mostly rural areas without intersecting any major towns along the way. SR 116 serves as a connector road, facilitating local travel between these state routes in the northern part of Sumter County.

The highway is a simple two-lane road for its entire length, and it is part of Alabama’s state highway system maintained by the Alabama Department of Transportation. Alabama State Route 116 also connects to a site of historical significance in Gainesville. At its junction with State Route 39, it passes the Gainesville Historic District, which includes a mid-19th century bandstand and park. This area, listed on the National Register of Historic Places, served as a community gathering spot for events like concerts and political rallies. The district is noted for its Greek Revival architecture, reflecting the cultural heritage of the region.

== Major intersections ==
The entire route is in Sumter County.

Location	mi	km	Destinations	Notes
	0.000	0.000	SR 17 – Emelle, Geiger	Western terminus
Gainesville	9.482	15.260	SR 39 (McKee Street) – Livingston, Epes, Union	Eastern terminus
1.000 mi = 1.609 km; 1.000 km = 0.621 mi
