= Gibbs House (Gainesville, Alabama) =

Historic house in Alabama, United States

- U.S. National Register of Historic Places
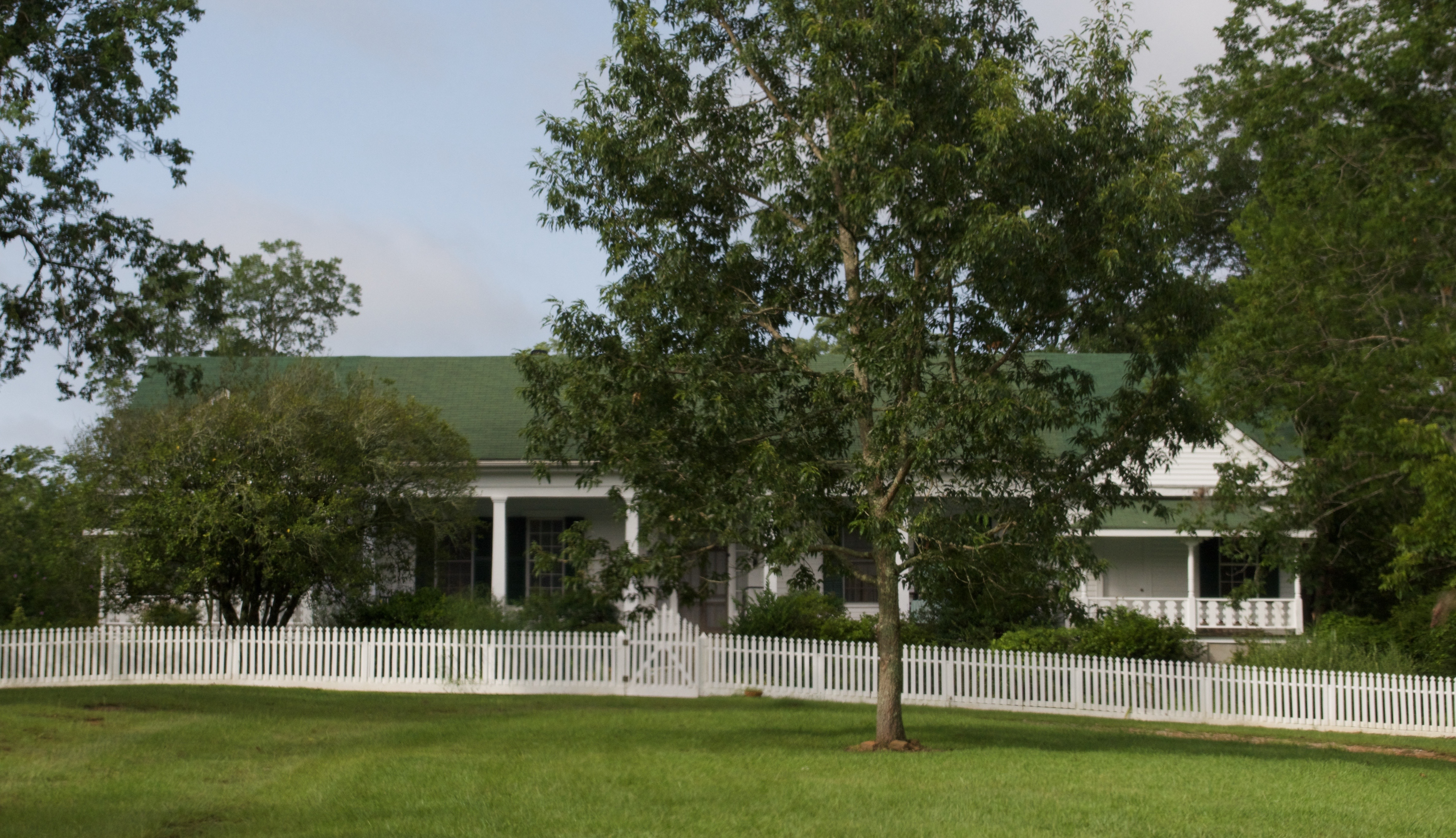

- Location within Alabama Location within the United States
- Location: SW of Spruce and Webster Sts., Gainesville, Alabama
- Coordinates: 32°48′47″N 88°9′53″W
- Area: 17.5 acres (7.1 ha)
- Built: 1861
- Architectural style: Greek Revival
- MPS: Gainesville MRA
- NRHP reference No.: 85002926
- Added to NRHP: October 3, 1985

The Gibbs House is a historic house in Gainesville, Alabama. The one-story wood-frame structure was built for Hawkins Gibbs from 1860 to 1861. The vernacular Greek Revival style house features a main central block with a side-gable roof, flanked by front-gabled wings to either side. The front facade of the main block features a full-width porch, set under the main roof. A similar version of this arrangement, largely unique to the Gainesville area in Alabama, is seen at Aduston Hall and a number of other nearby houses. It was added to the National Register of Historic Places on October 3, 1985.
