= Alabama State Route 115 =

State highway in Alabama, United States

State Route 115

Route information
- Maintained by ALDOT
- Length: 3.250 mi (5.230 km)

Major junctions
- South end: SR 9 southwest of Kellyton
- North end: US 280 in Kellyton

Location
- Country: United States
- State: Alabama

Highway system
- Alabama State Highway System; Interstate; US; State
← SR 114	→ SR 116

State Route 115 (SR 115) is a 3.250-mile-long (5.230 km) state highway in Coosa County. The southern terminus of the highway is at an intersection with SR 9 in the eastern part of the county. The northern terminus is at an intersection with U.S. Route 280 (US 280) northwest of Alexander City in Kellyton.

== Route description ==
SR 115 is routed along a two-lane roadway in southeastern Coosa County. It travels to the northeast from an intersection with SR 9 towards its northern terminus at US 280. The highway serves as a shortcut between SR 9 and US 280.

== Major intersections ==
The entire route is in Coosa County.

Location	mi	km	Destinations	Notes
	0.000	0.000	SR 9 – Wetumpka, Goodwater	Southern terminus
Kellyton	3.250	5.230	US 280 (SR 38) – Sylacauga, Alexander City	Northern terminus
1.000 mi = 1.609 km; 1.000 km = 0.621 mi
