= Mary T. Jeffries =

American temperance advocate and newspaper editor (1866–1930)

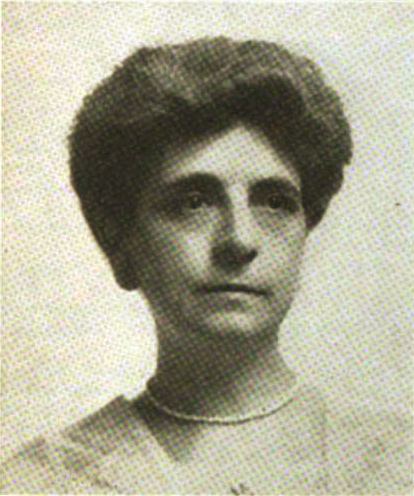
Mary Thomas Jeffries

Mary T. Jeffries (1863–1930) was an American temperance advocate and Prohibitionist. For 12 years, she served as President of the Alabama Woman's Christian Temperance Union (WCTU). From 1927 to 1928, she was an appointive member of the Alabama State Board of Education under Governor, Bibb Graves.

== Biography ==
Mary (nickname, "Mamie") Thomas was born at Clinton, Alabama, December 22, 1863. (Note: According to Familysearch.org, Mary was born in 1865 or 1866.) Her parents were George Lane Thomas (b. 1831) and Mary C. (McMillian) Thomas (1838–1866).

She was educated in the public schools of Birmingham.

In 1884, she married Walter Henry Jeffries (b. 1862), of Canton, Mississippi, and removed to Birmingham, where her husband was connected with the Birmingham Age Herald.

Jeffries joined the WCTU in 1887, and since that time has been an active worker in Alabama, serving in many official positions in the local and State organizations. She was State corresponding secretary, 1894–1903; and president, 1903–06, resigning in the latter year after the State Prohibition campaign. She then served for five years as vice-president, after which she was again made president (1917). She was, also, for eight years, editor of the Alabama White Ribbon. During the time she was not in office in the State Union, she served as president of the Birmingham central organization, and took the lead in all the Prohibition campaigns in that city.

Mary T. Jeffries died in Birmingham on September 3, 1930; burial was in that city's Oak Hill Cemetery.
