= Amelia Greenwald =

American nurse

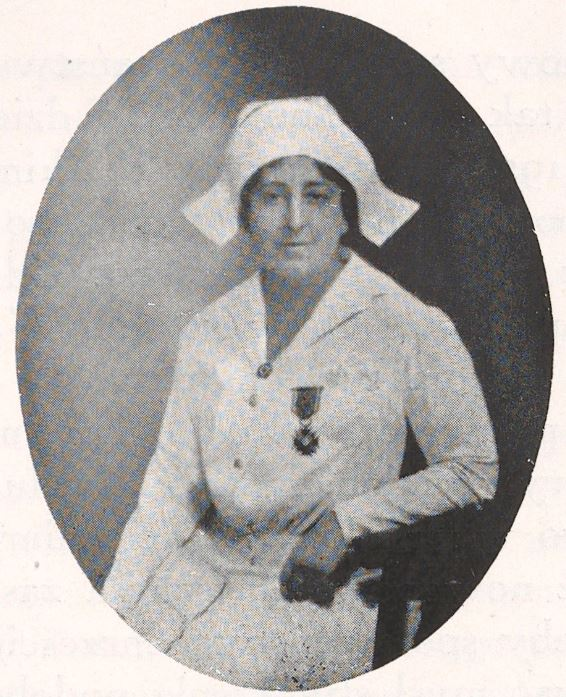
- Amelia Greenwald wearing her Cross of Merit in about 1926
- Born: March 1, 1881; Gainesville, Alabama
- Died: January 1, 1966 (aged 84); Eunice, Louisiana
- Occupation: Nurse

Amelia Greenwald (March 1, 1881 – January 1, 1966) was an American public health nurse. She worked in France and Germany during and after World War I, and founded the Jewish Nurses' Training School in Warsaw in 1923.

== Early life and education ==
Greenwald was born in Gainesville, Alabama, the youngest of the eight surviving children of Joseph Greenwald and Elisha (or Elise) Haas Greenwald. Her family was Jewish. Her father was a grain dealer, and served as mayor of Gainesville. Against her prominent family's wishes, she earned her nursing degree at the Touro Infirmary Training School for Nurses in New Orleans in 1908, with further studies at Johns Hopkins University and Teachers College, Columbia University. She also studied with Henrietta Szold in New York City.

== Career ==
=== In the United States ===
Greenwald helped establish the Pensacola Sanitarium in 1909. In 1916 she was director of the New Jersey Public Health Association. In 1919, she became head of the Committee for Work on Jewish Farm Women of the National Council of Jewish Women and the Jewish Agricultural and Industrial Aid Society. The program addressed rural women's health broadly, including English lessons, a resource library, and hygiene classes.

Later in life, in 1936, Greenwald opened a clothing store in Eunice, Louisiana.

=== In Europe ===
During World War I, Greenwald went to France with the American Red Cross, and worked in hospitals at Verdun and Savoy, as well as in Koblenz in Germany. She started the Jewish Nurses’ Training School in Warsaw in 1923, funded in part by American Jewish organizations. "There is no force in Poland which will act as an agency for good as will this group of girls who are going into homes, spreading knowledge and raising the standards of the people", she said in 1927, of the Polish nurses her school trained. She also held the first Polish driver's license issued to a woman, and is said to have introduced iced tea to Polish women.

Greenwald received a Victory Medal for her services in World War I, and the Polish Golden Cross of Merit for her work in Warsaw in the 1920s. She was a member of the American Legion.

=== In Palestine ===
From 1932 to 1933, Greenwald was head of the nurse's training program at Rothschild Hospital.

== Publications ==
- "For Jewish Women on the Farms" (1923)

== Personal life ==
In 1939, Greenwald adopted a teenaged German cousin, Liselotte Levy. She died from cancer in 1966, at the age of 84, in Eunice. Her papers are in the special collections at Tulane University Libraries.
