= Alabama State Route 39 =

State highway in Alabama, United States

State Route 39

Route information
- Maintained by ALDOT
- Length: 23.057 mi (37.107 km)

Major junctions
- South end: US 11 north of Livingston
- SR 116 at Gainesville
- North end: SR 14 at Clinton

Location
- Country: United States
- State: Alabama
- Counties: Sumter, Greene

Highway system
- Alabama State Highway System; Interstate; US; State
← SR 38	→ SR 40

State Route 39 (SR 39) is a 23.057-mile-long (37.107 km) state highway in the western part of the U.S. state of Alabama. The southern terminus of the highway is at its intersection with U.S. Route 11 (US 11) near Livingston. The northern terminus of the highway is at its intersection with SR 14 at Clinton, an unincorporated community in western Greene County.

== Route description ==
SR 39 is a rural, two-lane highway that serves as a connecting route between Livingston and western Greene County. From its southern terminus at US 11, the highway travels in a northerly direction. At Gainesville, it intersects, and serves as the eastern terminus of, SR 116. From Gainesville, the highway turns to the northeast, continuing this trajectory until it intersects SR 14 at Clinton.

== Major intersections ==
County	Location	mi	km	Destinations	Notes
Sumter		0.000	0.000	US 11 (SR 7) – Epes, Livingston	Southern terminus
Sumter	Gainesville	11.034	17.758	SR 116 west – Geiger	Eastern terminus of SR 116
Greene	Clinton	23.057	37.107	SR 14 – Aliceville, Eutaw, Tom Bevill Lock & Dam and Visitor Center	Northern terminus
1.000 mi = 1.609 km; 1.000 km = 0.621 mi
