= Clinton, Alabama =

Unincorporated community in Alabama, United States

- Unincorporated community
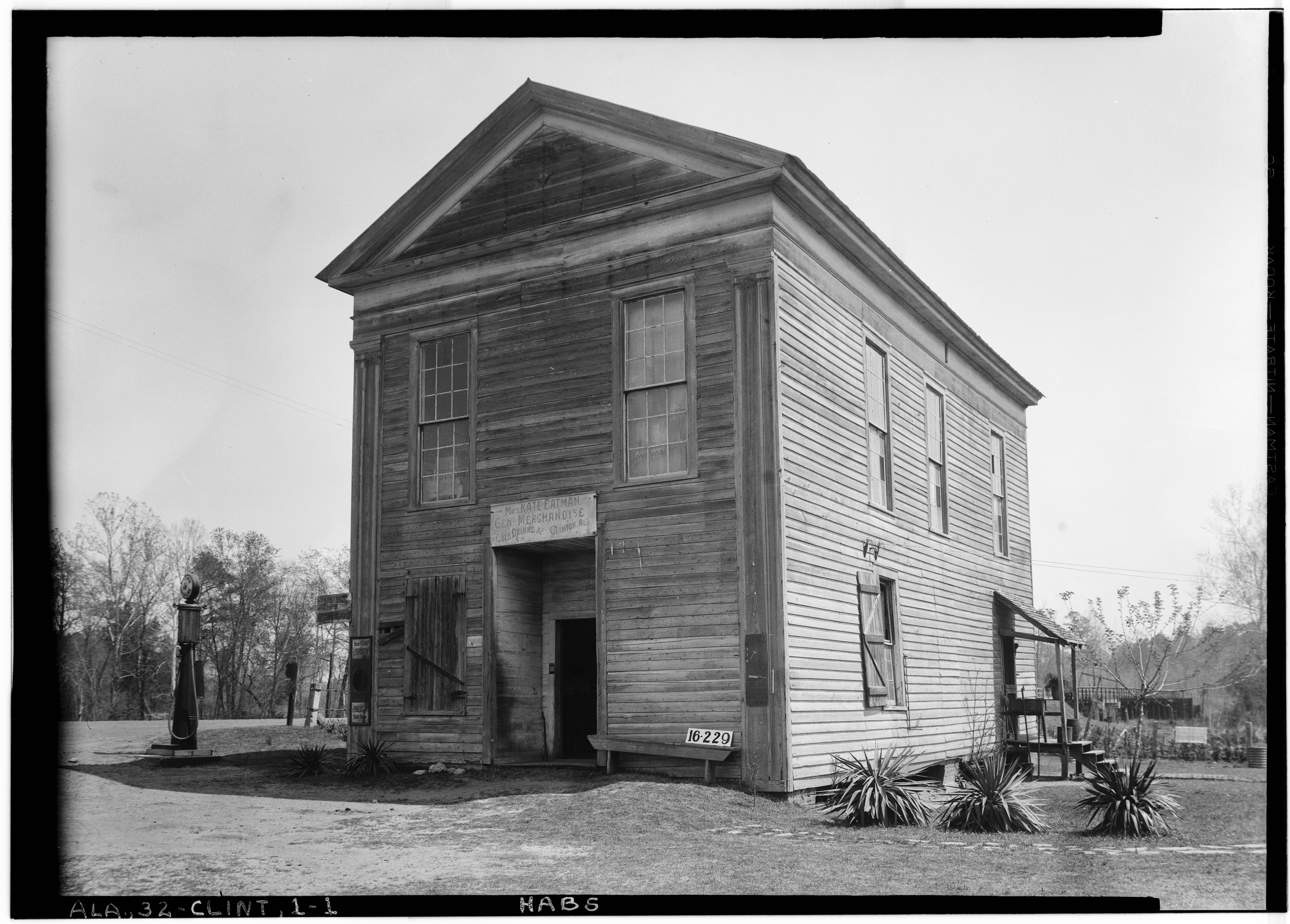
- Masonic Temple, photographed in January 1933 for the Historic American Buildings Survey

- Location within Alabama Location within the United States
- Coordinates: 32°54′49″N 87°59′33″W
- Country: United States
- State: Alabama
- County: Greene
- Elevation: 161 ft (49 m)
- Time zone: UTC-6 (Central (CST))
  - Summer (DST): UTC-5 (CDT)
- ZIP code: 35448
- Area codes: 205, 659
- GNIS feature ID: 116272

Clinton is an unincorporated community in Greene County, Alabama, United States. Located at the junction of Alabama State Routes 14 and 39, it lies approximately 7.9 miles (12.7 km) northwest of the county seat, Eutaw. Clinton maintains a post office, serving the area under ZIP code 35448.

== Notable people ==
- Mary T. Jeffries (1863-1930), President, Alabama Woman's Christian Temperance Union; appointive member, Alabama State Board of Education
