= Laura Watson House =

Historic house in Alabama, United States

- U.S. National Register of Historic Places
- Location within Alabama Location within the United States
- Location: Epes Rd., Gainesville, Alabama
- Coordinates: 32°48′52″N 88°9′11″W
- Area: less than one acre
- Built: 1900
- MPS: Gainesville MRA
- NRHP reference No.: 85002928
- Added to NRHP: October 3, 1985

The Laura Watson House was a historic house in Gainesville, Alabama. The one-story, wood frame, spraddle roof house was built for Laura Watson and her son, Booker, circa 1900. It was significant as a surviving example of what was once a typical type of dwelling for small African American freeholders in Alabama. It was added to the National Register of Historic Places on October 3, 1985.
