= Aduston Hall =

Historic house in Alabama, United States

- U.S. Historic district – Contributing property
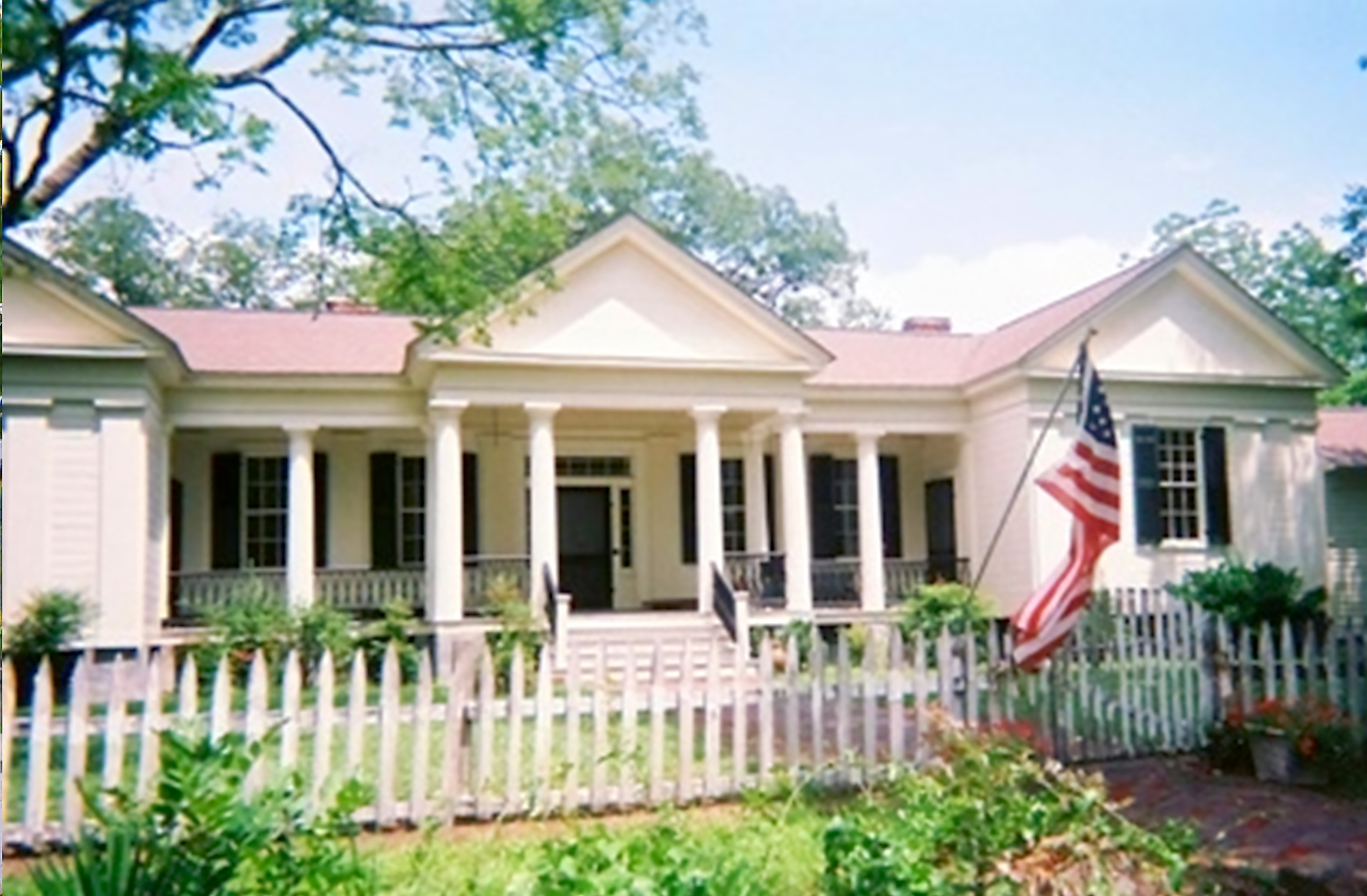
- Aduston Hall in 2007

- Location within Alabama Location within the United States
- Location: Gainesville, Alabama, United States
- Coordinates: 32°48′47″N 88°9′36″W
- Built: 1844–46
- Architectural style: Greek Revival
- Part of: Gainesville Historic District (ID85002925)

Aduston Hall is a historic antebellum plantation house in the riverside town of Gainesville, Alabama. Although the raised cottage displays the strict symmetry and precise detailing of the Greek Revival style, it is very unusual in its massing. The house is low and spread out over one-story with a fluid floor-plan more reminiscent of a 20th-century California ranch house than the typically boxy neoclassical houses of its own era.

It is a contributing property to the Gainesville Historic District. The district was listed on the Alabama Register of Landmarks and Heritage on March 25, 1976, and the National Register of Historic Places on October 3, 1985. Now owned by the Sumter County Historical Society, the house is operated as a visitor welcome center for the historic district. The Society also uses the house and grounds as the centerpiece of its Sumter Heritage Days, held each spring. In 1994, the Historical Society received $130,000 in local, state, and federal funds to stabilize and restore the house.

== History ==
Aduston Hall was built as a summer home for Amos Travis from 1844 to 1846. Travis, a resident of Mobile, used the house as a refuge from the heat, humidity, and disease that plagued Mobile during the summer months. The property was a largely self-sufficient plantation complex. Five 19th-century outbuildings remain at the site.

== Architecture ==
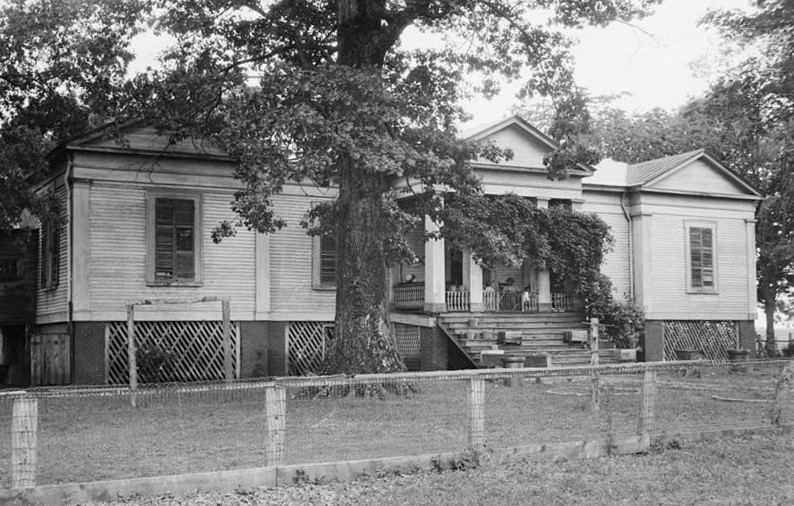
The now-destroyed Norwood Plantation in Faunsdale, Alabama.

The one-story wood-frame house is composed of a rectangular central main block and H-shaped side wings. The roof of the central portion runs parallel to the front of the house. The center of this block is fronted by a temple-like pedimented Doric portico projecting several feet out from the main Doric porch under the main roof. The central front entrance door is derived from designs published by Asher Benjamin. The main block is abutted on both sides by front gabled side wings projecting past the central portion to the front and rear of the house. These are ornamented with Doric pilasters. With its H-shaped plan, the house provided excellent cross ventilation for all of the major rooms.

Historically, there were three other very similar houses known in the vicinity of Aduston Hall. The Travis-Derryberry-Harwood House (also built by the Travis family as a summerhouse), which also survives in Gainesville, the Norwood Plantation in Faunsdale, Alabama, destroyed in the 1930s, and the Van de Graaff home which was located in the Virginia Hill area of Gainesville .
