= Coffin Shop =

Historic building in Gainesville, Alabama

- U.S. National Register of Historic Places
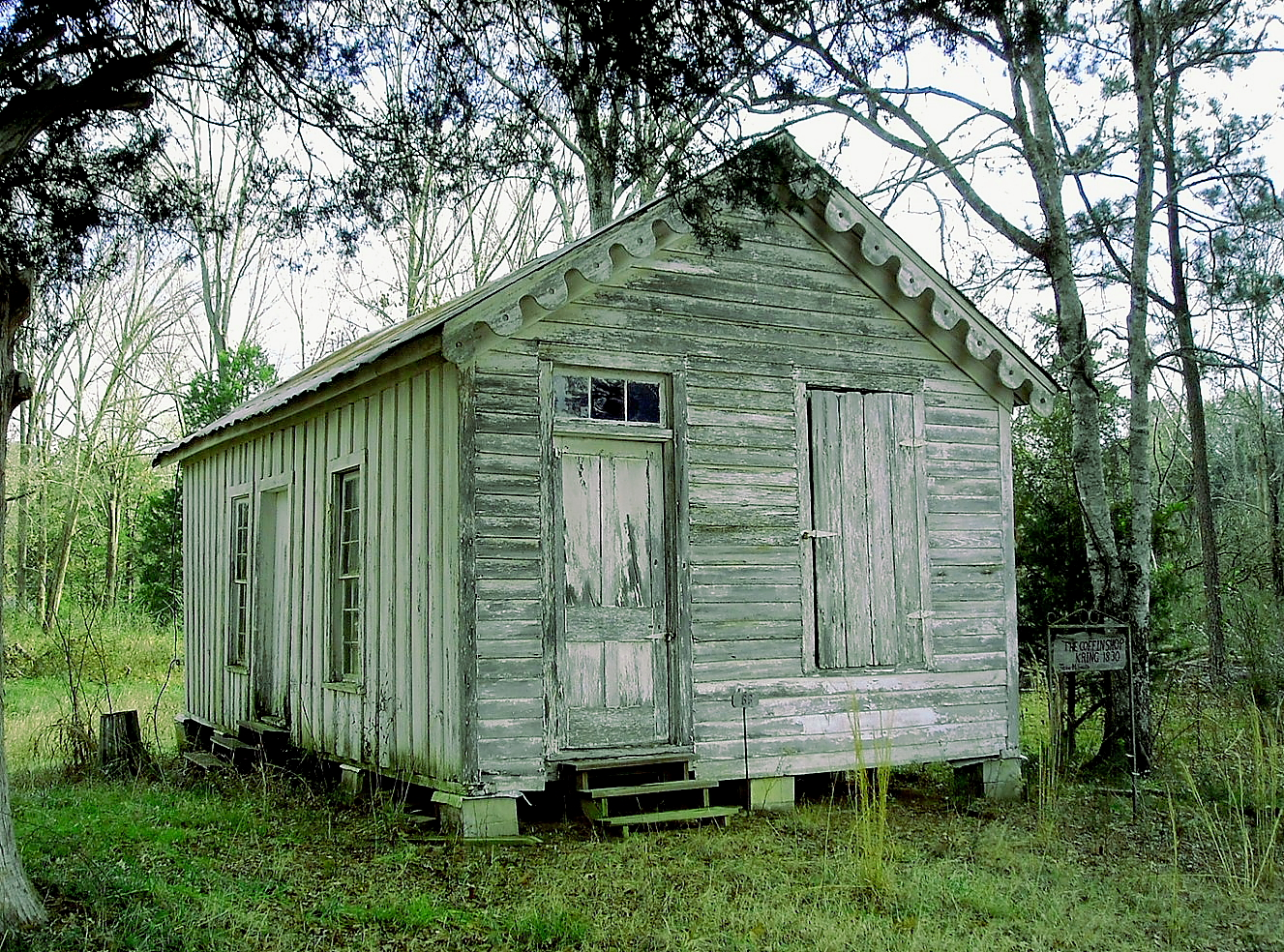

- Location within Alabama Location within the United States
- Location: McKee and Monroe Sts., Gainesville, Alabama
- Coordinates: 32°49′18″N 88°9′30″W
- Area: less than one acre
- Built by: Edward N. Kring
- Architectural style: Shotgun Plan
- MPS: Gainesville MRA
- NRHP reference No.: 85002930
- Added to NRHP: October 29, 1985

The Coffin Shop, also known as the Kring Carpenter Shop, is a historic commercial building in Gainesville, Alabama. The one-story wood-frame structure was built by Edward N. Kring between 1860 and 1870 as an auxiliary space to his carpenter shop, which originally stood next door. It is a simple gable-fronted structure, with a shotgun plan interior. The exterior features a clapboard-sided front, with a scalloped bargeboard trim on the gable. The other external walls are covered in board and batten siding. It was added to the National Register of Historic Places on October 29, 1985.
