= Dr. H. B. Ward House =

Historic house in Alabama, United States

- U.S. National Register of Historic Places
- Alabama Register of Landmarks and Heritage
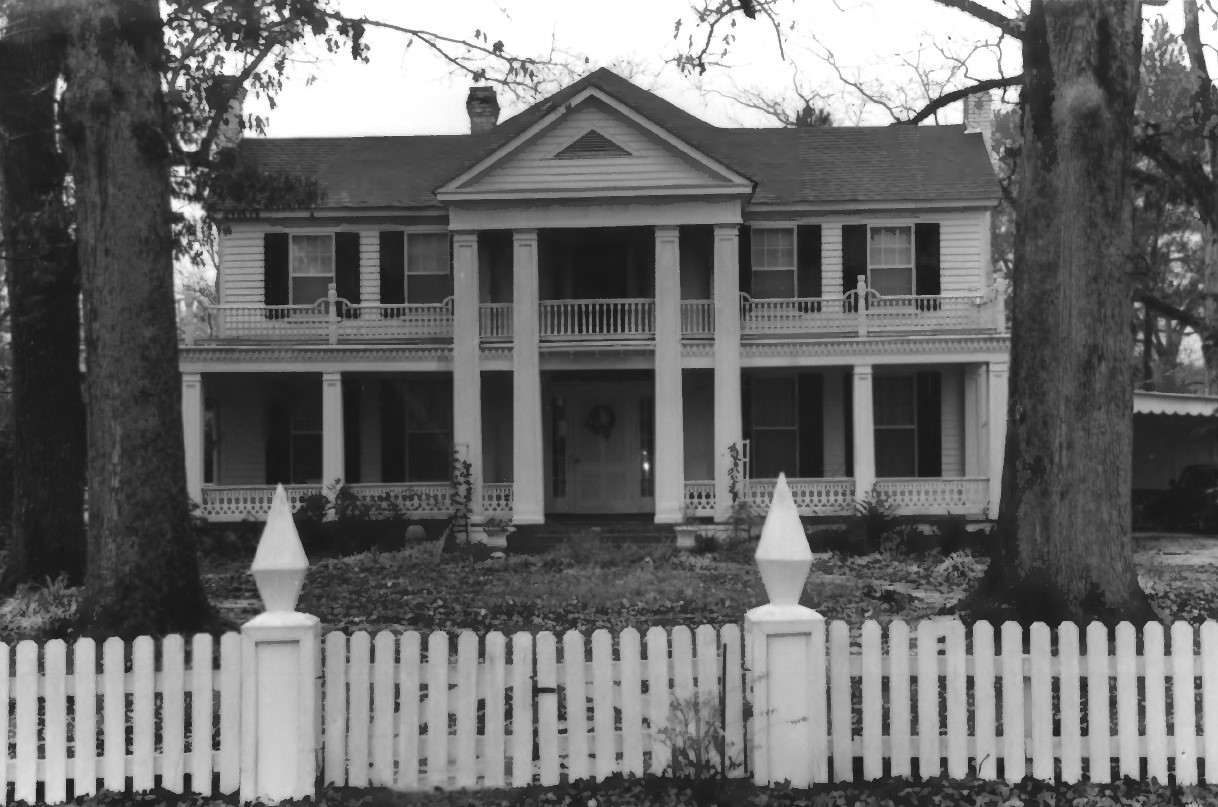
- Dr. H. B. Ward House in 1996

- Location within Alabama Location within the United States
- Location: 202 4th Ave., Cuba, Alabama
- Coordinates: 32°25′42″N 88°22′33″W
- Area: 2 acres (0.81 ha)
- Built: 1880
- Architectural style: Greek Revival, I-house
- NRHP reference No.: 98001020

Significant dates
- Added to NRHP: August 14, 1998
- Designated ARLH: November 17, 1995

The Dr. H. B. Ward House is a historic house in Cuba, Alabama. The two-story, wood-frame I-house was built for Dr. Henry Bascomb (H.B.) Ward in 1880. It has architectural influences drawn from Greek Revival and late Victorian architecture. The primary facade is five bays wide, with a one-story porch spanning the entire width. A two-story central portico, Greek Revival in style, projects from the central bay and over the one-story porch. A large rear addition was made to the house circa 1890. It was added to the National Register of Historic Places on August 14, 1998.
