= Colgin Hill =

Historic house in Alabama, United States

- U.S. National Register of Historic Places
- Location within Alabama Location within the United States
- Location: Off AL 39, Gainesville, Alabama
- Coordinates: 32°48′40″N 88°9′20″W
- Area: 107 acres (43 ha)
- Built: 1832
- Architectural style: Greek Revival
- MPS: Gainesville MRA
- NRHP reference No.: 85002924
- Added to NRHP: October 3, 1985

Colgin Hill is a historic house in Gainesville, Alabama. The one-story structure began as a log dogtrot house for William Colgin in 1832. The breezeway was enclosed, creating a center hall, and Greek Revival details added within a couple of decades of the initial construction. It serves as an example of the transition in Alabama from the frontier to a more refined society. Historians consider it to be the oldest extant building in Gainesville. It was added to the National Register of Historic Places on October 3, 1985.
