= Dr. James Alvis Beavers House =

Historic house in Alabama, United States

- U.S. National Register of Historic Places
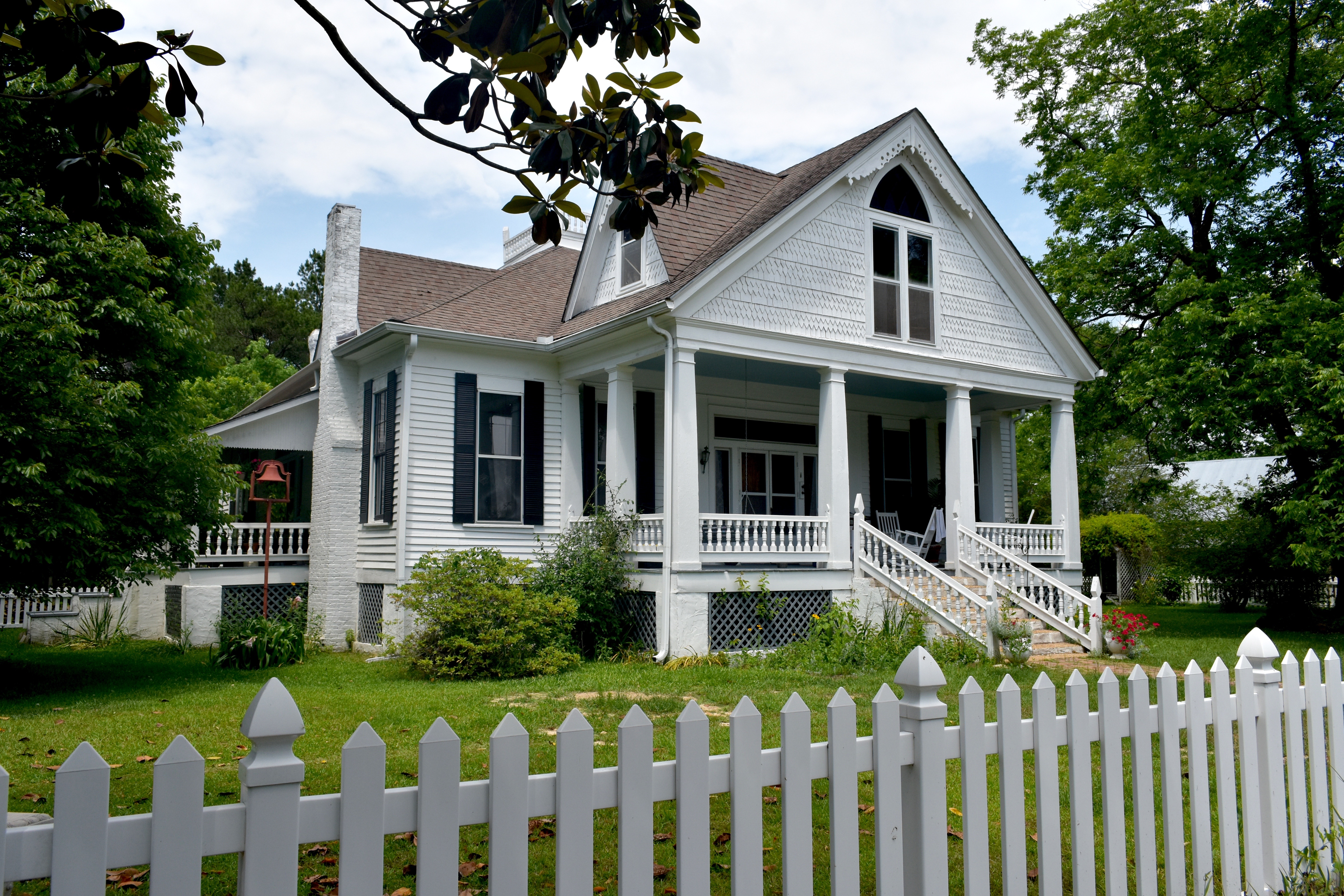

- Location within Alabama Location within the United States
- Location: Old Livingston Rd. Cuba, Alabama
- Coordinates: 32°26′20″N 88°21′43″W
- Area: less than one acre
- Architectural style: Greek Revival, Gothic
- NRHP reference No.: 00001025
- Added to NRHP: August 31, 2000

The Dr. James Alvis Beavers House is a historic house in Cuba, Alabama, United States. The one-and-a-half-story wood-frame house was built by Stephen M. Potts between 1854 and 1857. Initially built in a simpler style, the house was modified in succeeding decades into a picturesque combination of the Greek Revival and Gothic Revival styles. It was purchased by Dr. James Alvis Beavers in 1898. The Beavers family retained ownership until 1980, when it was acquired at auction by the Charles Munoz family. It was added to the National Register of Historic Places on August 31, 2000.
