= Gainesville Park and Bandstand =

- Park and Bandstand
- U.S. National Register of Historic Places
- Location within Alabama Location within the United States
- Location: State and McKee Sts., Gainesville, Alabama
- Coordinates: 32°49′22″N 88°9′30″W
- Area: less than one acre
- MPS: Gainesville MRA
- NRHP reference No.: 85002929
- Added to NRHP: October 29, 1985

The Gainesville Park and Bandstand is a historic park and bandstand in Gainesville, Alabama. The bandstand is a Greek Revival-style pavilion, built circa 1850. It is a rare Alabama example of an enduring mid-19th century park structure. The entire park is surrounded by 19th century wrought iron fence. The park and bandstand were listed on the National Register of Historic Places on October 29, 1985.
