= Main–Yankee Street Historic District =

Historic district in Alabama, United States

- Main-Yankee Street Historic District
- U.S. National Register of Historic Places
- U.S. Historic district
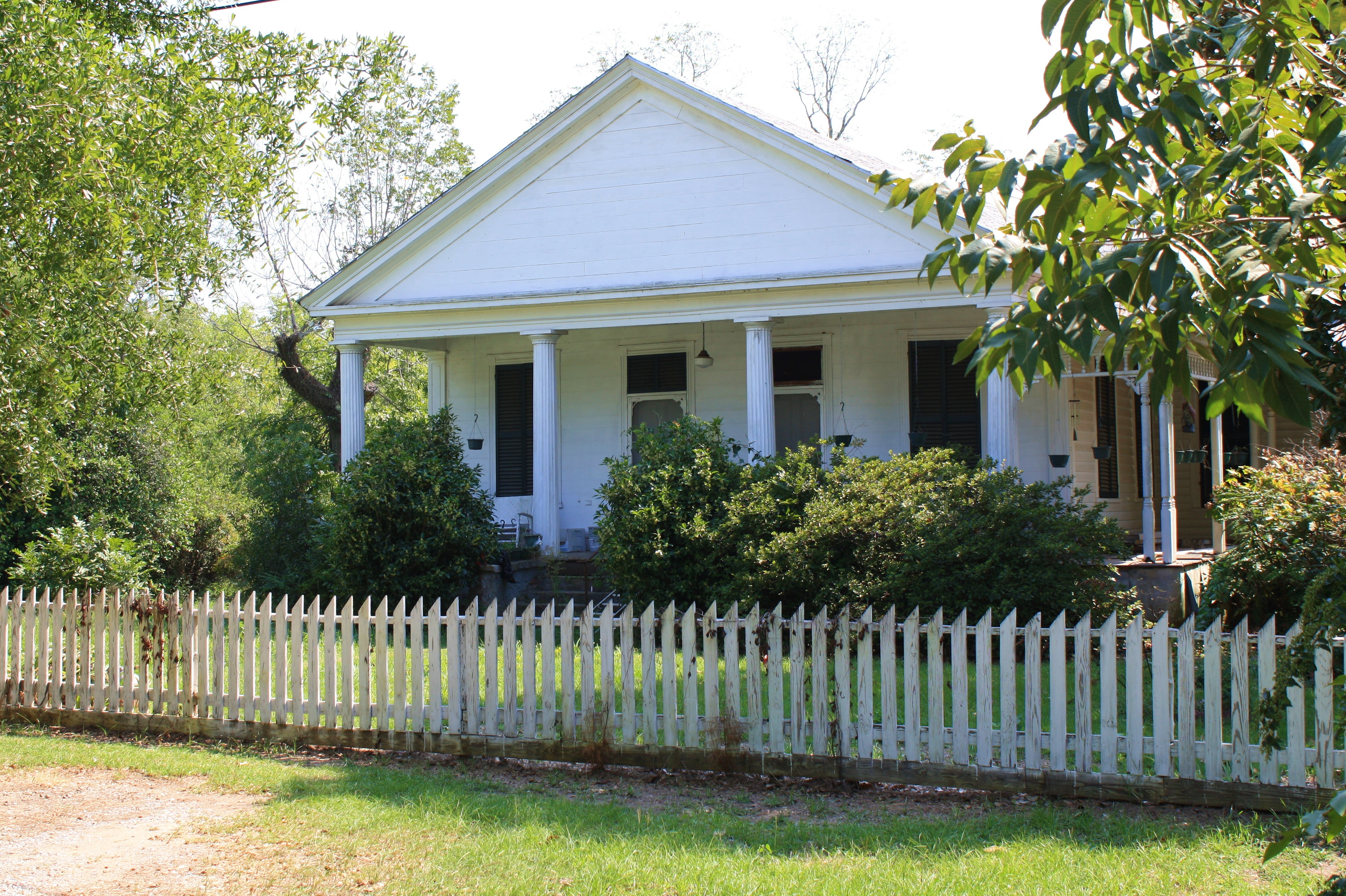
- The Howard-Goodloe-Bolton House, one of five contributing buildings in the district.

- Location within Alabama Location within the United States
- Location: Roughly bounded by Main, Washington, and School Sts., Gainesville, Alabama
- Coordinates: 32°49′21″N 88°9′21″W
- Area: 6.5 acres (2.6 ha)
- Architectural style: Greek Revival, Federal
- MPS: Gainesville MRA
- NRHP reference No.: 85002927
- Added to NRHP: October 3, 1985

The Main–Yankee Street Historic District is a historic district that encompasses an antebellum residential section of Gainesville, Alabama. The district was listed on the National Register of Historic Places on October 3, 1985. It covers 6.5 acres (2.6 ha) and contains five historically significant contributing properties, all predating the American Civil War.

== Description ==
Gainesville lies on the south bank of the Tombigbee River in southwestern Alabama. It reached its zenith prior to the American Civil War; when it was an important inland port, before the wide-scale introduction of railroads.

The Main–Yankee Street Historic District is one of two historic districts in the town, the other being the Gainesville Historic District. The district is centered on Main Street, also known as Yankee Street. Architectural styles present include Federal and Greek Revival. The contributing properties in the district are the Russell-Woodruff-Turrentine House, circa 1835–40; Lewis-Jones-Fields House, circa 1840–50; Lewis-Long House, circa 1835–40; Falls House, circa 1840–50; and Howard-Goodloe-Bolton House, circa 1840–50.
