= Gainesville Historic District =

Historic district in Alabama, United States

- U.S. National Register of Historic Places
- U.S. Historic district
- Alabama Register of Landmarks and Heritage
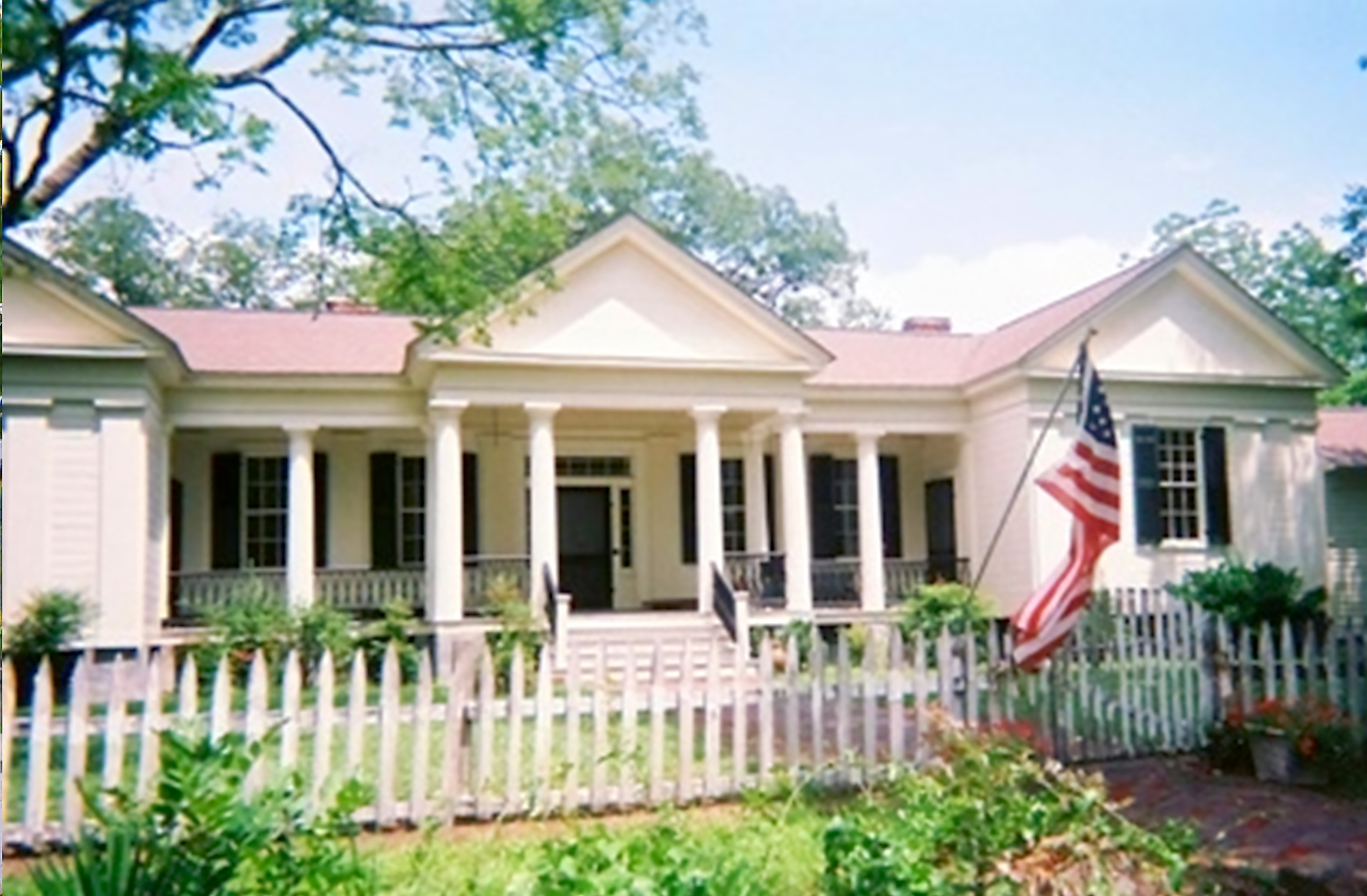
- Aduston Hall, built from 1844–46.

- Location within Alabama Location within the United States
- Location: Roughly bounded by North Carolina, Church and School and Lafayette Sts., end of town grid, and Webster St., Gainesville, Alabama
- Coordinates: 32°49′1″N 88°9′26″W
- Area: 76 acres (31 ha)
- Architectural style: Federal, Greek Revival, early Victorian
- MPS: Gainesville MRA
- NRHP reference No.: 85002925

Significant dates
- Added to NRHP: October 3, 1985
- Designated ARLH: March 25, 1976

The Gainesville Historic District is a historic district that encompasses a historic section of Gainesville, Alabama, United States. The district was listed on the Alabama Register of Landmarks and Heritage on March 25, 1976 and the National Register of Historic Places on October 3, 1985. The district covered 76 acres (31 ha) and contained 24 historically significant contributing properties when first listed.

== Description ==
Gainesville lies on the south bank of the Tombigbee River in southwestern Alabama. It reached its zenith prior to the American Civil War; when it was an important inland port, before the wide-scale introduction of railroads.

The Gainesville Historic District is one of two historic districts in the town, the other being the Main–Yankee Street Historic District. The district is bounded by North Carolina, Church, School, Lafayette, and Webster streets. It is bisected down the center north to south by McKee Street, now overlain by Alabama Highway 39. Architectural styles present include Federal, Greek Revival, Queen Anne, and other Victorian types. The Sumter County Historical Society owns and utilizes one historic contributing property, Aduston Hall, as a welcome and visitor center for the district.
