= Gainesville, Alabama =

Gainesville
- Town
- Location of Gainesville in Sumter County, Alabama.
- Coordinates: 32°48′54″N 88°09′39″W
- Country: United States
- State: Alabama
- County: Sumter

Area
  - Total: 1.72 sq mi (4.45 km^{2})
  - Land: 1.72 sq mi (4.45 km^{2})
  - Water: 0 sq mi (0.00 km^{2})
- Elevation: 154 ft (47 m)

Population (2020)
  - Total: 172
  - Density: 100.1/sq mi (38.63/km^{2})
- Time zone: UTC-6 (Central (CST))
  - Summer (DST): UTC-5 (CDT)
- ZIP code: 35464
- Area codes: 205, 659
- FIPS code: 01-28768
- GNIS feature ID: 2406537

Gainesville is a town in Sumter County, Alabama, United States. Founded in 1832, it was incorporated in 1835. As of the 2020 census, Gainesville had a population of 172. Confederate Lieutenant General Nathan Bedford Forrest surrendered his men near Gainesville on May 19, 1865, at the Civil War's end.

== Geography ==
According to the U.S. Census Bureau, the town has a total area of 1.7 square miles (4.4 km^{2}), all land.

== Demographics ==
Historical population
Census	Pop.	Note	%±
1850	1,500		—
1880	960		—
1890	1,017		5.9%
1900	817		−19.7%
1910	532		−34.9%
1920	355		−33.3%
1930	329		−7.3%
1940	283		−14.0%
1950	319		12.7%
1960	214		−32.9%
1970	255		19.2%
1980	207		−18.8%
1990	449		116.9%
2000	220		−51.0%
2010	208		−5.5%
2020	172		−17.3%
U.S. Decennial Census; 2013 Estimate

As of the 2010 United States census, there were 208 people living in the town. The racial makeup of the town was 82.2% Black, 16.3% White and 1.4% from two or more races.

As of the census of 2000, there were 220 people, 87 households, and 58 families living in the town. The population density was 128.3 inhabitants per square mile (49.5/km^{2}). There were 122 housing units at an average density of 71.1 per square mile (27.5/km^{2}). The racial makeup of the town was 22.73% White and 77.27% Black or African American.

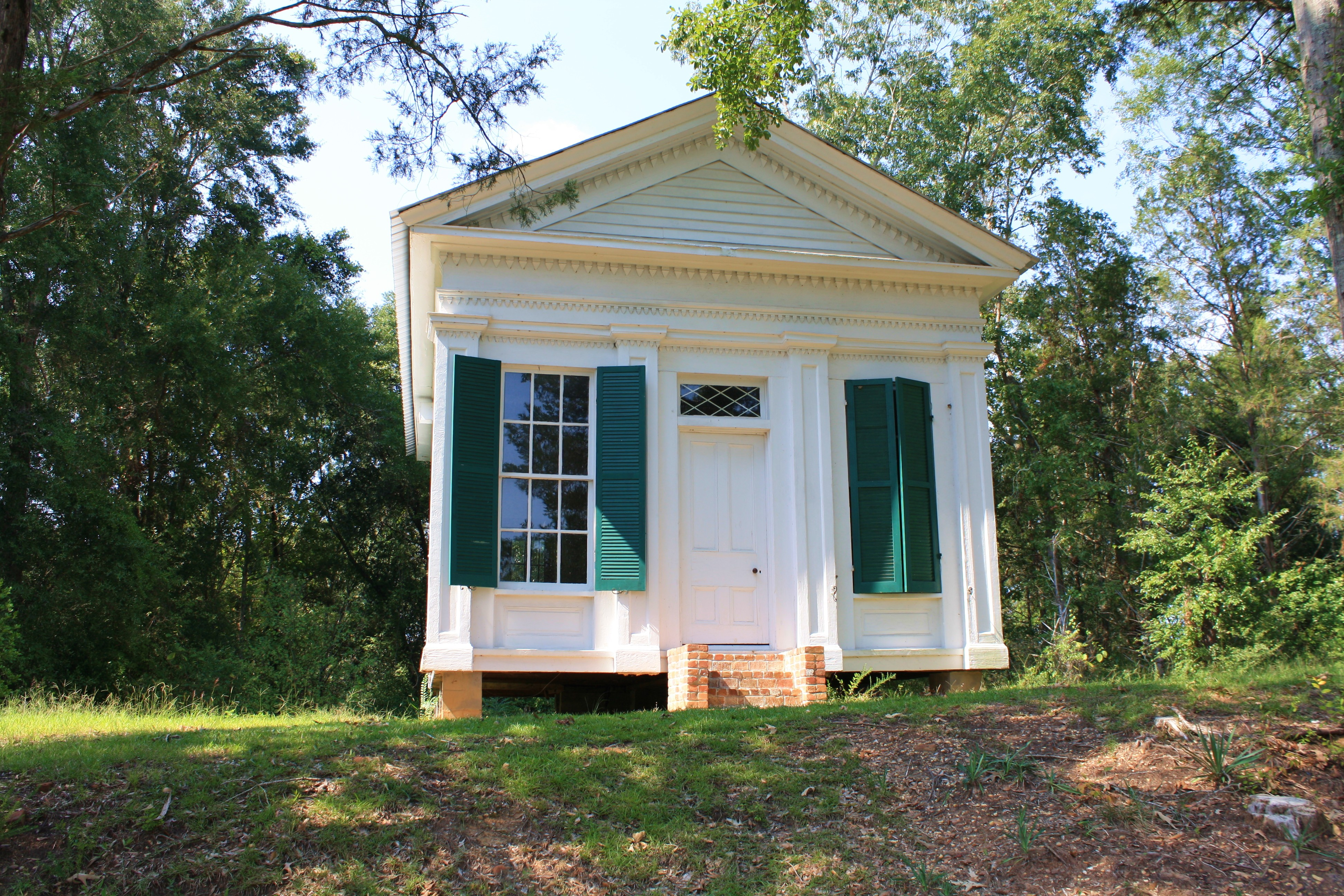
The former Gainesville National Bank building (built 1838) on State Street.

There were 87 households, out of which 29.9% had children under the age of 18 living with them, 31.0% were married couples living together, 32.2% had a female householder with no husband present, and 33.3% were non-families. 33.3% of all households were made up of individuals, and 16.1% had someone living alone who was 65 years of age or older. The average household size was 2.53 and the average family size was 3.28.

In the town, the population was spread out, with 32.3% under the age of 18, 9.1% from 18 to 24, 23.6% from 25 to 44, 14.5% from 45 to 64, and 20.5% who were 65 years of age or older. The median age was 37 years. For every 100 females, there were 96.4 males. For every 100 females age 18 and over, there were 93.5 males.

The median income for a household in the town was $10,938, and the median income for a family was $13,750. Males had a median income of $25,625 versus $15,625 for females. The per capita income for the town was $16,176. About 60.4% of families and 70.1% of the population were below the poverty line, including 82.6% of those under the age of eighteen and 48.3% of those 65 or over.

== Points of interest ==
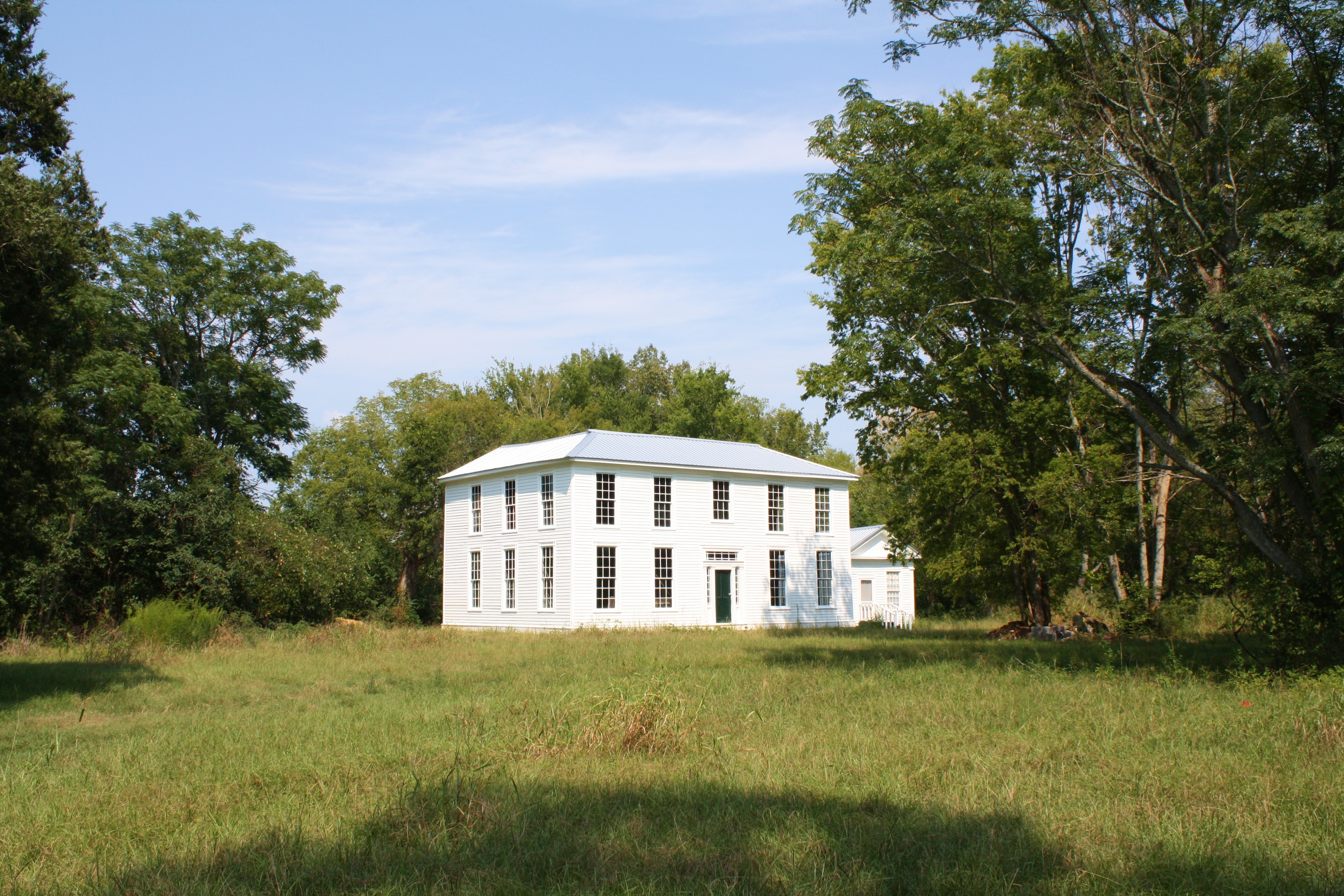
The Moses Lewis House (Lewis-Long House) on Yankee Street. Lewis laid out the town and named it in honor of George Strother Gaines. The house is part of the Main–Yankee Street Historic District.

Gainesville has 67 historic sites that are listed on the National Register of Historic Places, with many that predate the American Civil War. The historic districts include the Gainesville Historic District and Main–Yankee Street Historic District. Individual structures include Aduston Hall, the Coffin Shop, Colgin Hill, Gibbs House, Col. Green G. Mobley House, the Park and Bandstand, and Laura Watson House.

== Notable people ==
- Buck Buchanan, former NFL player for the Kansas City Chiefs.
- Jaybird Coleman, country blues harmonica player, guitarist, and singer
- Maria Fearing, Presbyterian missionary.
- Amelia Greenwald, international public health nurse during World War I and between the wars
