= Alabama State Route 148 =

State highway in Alabama, United States

State Route 148

Route information
- Maintained by ALDOT
- Length: 20.025 mi (32.227 km)

Major junctions
- West end: SR 21 in Sylacauga
- East end: SR 9 in Millerville

Location
- Country: United States
- State: Alabama
- Counties: Clay, Talladega

Highway system
- Alabama State Highway System; Interstate; US; State
← SR 147	→ SR 149

State Route 148 (SR 148) is a 20.025-mile (32.227 km) state highway that serves as an east–west connector between Sylacauga and Millersville through Clay and Talladega counties. SR 148 intersects SR 21 at its western terminus and SR 9 at its eastern terminus.

== Route description ==
SR 148 begins at an intersection with SR 21 in the central business district of Sylacauga. From this point, SR 148 follows a meandering easterly route through the Talladega National Forest en route to its eastern terminus at SR 9 in Millerville.

== Major intersections ==
County	Location	mi	km	Destinations	Notes
Talladega	Sylacauga	0.0	0.0	SR 21 (North Broadway Avenue) – Talladega	Western terminus
Clay	Millerville	20.025	32.227	SR 9 (Shady Grove Road) – Goodwater, Ashland	Eastern terminus
1.000 mi = 1.609 km; 1.000 km = 0.621 mi
