= Pinckneyville (disambiguation) =

Pinckneyville is a city in the U.S. state of Illinois.

Pinckneyville may also refer to:

- Pinckneyville, Alabama
- Pinckneyville, Mississippi
- Pinckneyville (Union, South Carolina), historic site

== See also ==
- Pinkneyville, New Jersey
