= Clay County, Alabama =

County in Alabama, United States

- County
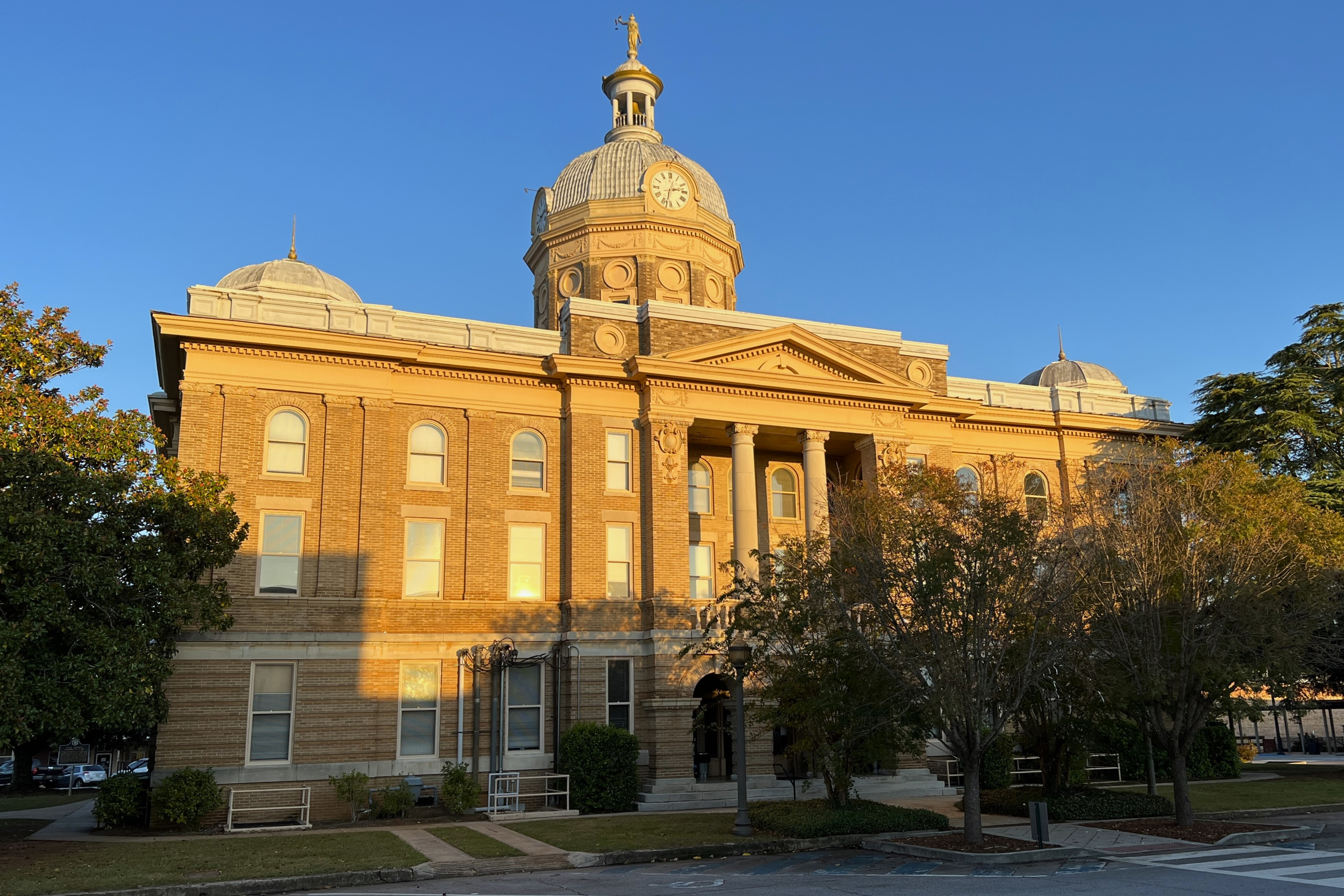
- Clay County Courthouse in Ashland

- Location within the U.S. state of Alabama
- Coordinates: 33°16′20″N 85°51′40″W
- Country: United States
- State: Alabama
- Founded: December 7, 1866
- Named for: Henry Clay
- Seat: Ashland
- Largest city: Lineville

Area
  - Total: 606 sq mi (1,570 km^{2})
  - Land: 604 sq mi (1,560 km^{2})
  - Water: 2.0 sq mi (5.2 km^{2}) 0.3%

Population (2020)
  - Total: 14,236
  - Estimate (2025): 14,207 ▼
  - Density: 23.6/sq mi (9.10/km^{2})
- Time zone: UTC−6 (Central)
  - Summer (DST): UTC−5 (CDT)
- Congressional district: 3rd
- Website: alabamaclaycounty.com
- County Number 17 on Alabama Licence Plates

Clay County is a county in the east central part of the U.S. state of Alabama. As of the 2020 census the population was 14,236. Its county seat is Ashland. Its name is in honor of Henry Clay, famous American statesman, member of the United States Senate from Kentucky and United States Secretary of State in the 19th century. It was the last dry county in Alabama with no wet cities within its boundaries, until a vote on March 1, 2016, approved the sale of alcohol in Lineville and Ashland.

== History ==
Clay County was established on December 7, 1866, from land taken from Randolph and Talladega counties. Named after the famous statesman Henry Clay, the county seat itself was named after his estate in Lexington, Kentucky called "Ashland". The county was covered with a heavy growth of trees, and a part of the territory was occupied by the Creek Indians. The early pioneers acquired the lands by government entry and the Indian lands by public auction. The families came wholly from Fayette County, Georgia. Clay County was formed for geographic reasons. The citizens of the area had a difficult time reaching the county seat of Wedowee in Randolph County because of the Tallapoosa River to the east. Talladega was difficult to reach because of the intervening mountains. Even today, Clay County is one of only three counties in Alabama to have no U.S. highways in its boundaries. Ashland was a mining center, particularly for graphite.

During the Desert Shield/Storm conflict, Clay County had more soldiers serving per capita than any other county in the United States.

== Geography ==
According to the United States Census Bureau, the county has a total area of 606 square miles (1,570 km^{2}), of which 604 square miles (1,560 km^{2}) is land and 2.0 square miles (5.2 km^{2}) (0.3%) is water.

=== Adjacent counties ===
- Cleburne County – north
- Randolph County – east
- Tallapoosa County – south
- Coosa County – southwest
- Talladega County – west

=== National protected area ===
- Talladega National Forest (part)

== Transportation ==
=== Major highways ===
- State Route 9
- State Route 48
- State Route 49
- State Route 63
- State Route 77
- State Route 148
- State Route 281

=== Rail ===
- CSX Transportation
- Norfolk Southern Railway

== Demographics ==
Historical population
Census	Pop.	Note	%±
1870	9,560		—
1880	12,938		35.3%
1890	15,765		21.9%
1900	17,099		8.5%
1910	21,006		22.8%
1920	22,645		7.8%
1930	17,768		−21.5%
1940	16,907		−4.8%
1950	13,929		−17.6%
1960	12,400		−11.0%
1970	12,636		1.9%
1980	13,703		8.4%
1990	13,252		−3.3%
2000	14,254		7.6%
2010	13,932		−2.3%
2020	14,236		2.2%
2025 (est.)	14,207	▼	−0.2%
U.S. Decennial Census; 1790–1960 1900–1990; 1990–2000 2010–2020

=== Racial and ethnic composition ===
Clay County, Alabama – Racial and ethnic composition Note: the US Census treats Hispanic/Latino as an ethnic category. This table excludes Latinos from the racial categories and assigns them to a separate category. Hispanics/Latinos may be of any race.
Race / Ethnicity (NH = Non-Hispanic)	Pop 2000	Pop 2010	Pop 2020	% 2000	% 2010	% 2020
White alone (NH)	11,616	11,186	11,261	81.49%	80.29%	79.10%
Black or African American alone (NH)	2,219	2,048	1,942	15.57%	14.70%	13.64%
Native American or Alaska Native alone (NH)	44	55	45	0.31%	0.39%	0.32%
Asian alone (NH)	12	23	46	0.08%	0.17%	0.32%
Pacific Islander alone (NH)	1	0	4	0.01%	0.00%	0.03%
Other race alone (NH)	3	5	26	0.02%	0.04%	0.18%
Mixed race or Multiracial (NH)	106	216	463	0.74%	1.55%	3.25%
Hispanic or Latino (any race)	253	399	449	1.77%	2.86%	3.15%
Total	14,254	13,932	14,236	100.00%	100.00%	100.00%

=== 2020 census ===
As of the 2020 census, the county had a population of 14,236. The median age was 45.2 years. 20.6% of residents were under the age of 18 and 21.3% of residents were 65 years of age or older. For every 100 females there were 98.1 males, and for every 100 females age 18 and over there were 95.4 males age 18 and over.

The racial makeup of the county was 79.9% White, 13.8% Black or African American, 0.4% American Indian and Alaska Native, 0.3% Asian, 0.0% Native Hawaiian and Pacific Islander, 1.4% from some other race, and 4.2% from two or more races. Hispanic or Latino residents of any race comprised 3.2% of the population.

0.0% of residents lived in urban areas, while 100.0% lived in rural areas.

There were 5,926 households in the county, of which 28.8% had children under the age of 18 living with them and 26.9% had a female householder with no spouse or partner present. About 28.7% of all households were made up of individuals and 14.4% had someone living alone who was 65 years of age or older.

There were 7,035 housing units, of which 15.8% were vacant. Among occupied housing units, 73.8% were owner-occupied and 26.2% were renter-occupied. The homeowner vacancy rate was 1.4% and the rental vacancy rate was 6.9%.

=== 2010 census ===
As of the census of 2010, there were 13,932 people, 5,670 households, and 3,978 families residing in the county. The population density was 23 people per square mile (8.9 people/km^{2}). There were 6,776 housing units at an average density of 11 units per square mile (4.2 units/km^{2}). The racial makeup of the county was 81.7% White (non-Hispanic), 14.8% Black or African American, 0.4% Native American, 0.2% Asian, 0.0% Pacific Islander, 1.2% from other races, and 1.7% from two or more races. 2.9% of the population were Hispanic or Latino of any race.

=== 2000 census ===
As of the census of 2000, there were 14,254 people, 5,765 households, and 4,098 families residing in the county. The population density was 24 people per square mile (9.3 people/km^{2}). There were 6,612 housing units at an average density of 11 units per square mile (4.2 units/km^{2}). The racial makeup of the county was 77.62% White (non-Hispanic), 19.70% Black or African American, 0.32% Native American, 0.10% Asian, 0.02% Pacific Islander, 0.46% from other races, and 0.79% from two or more races. 4.77% of the population were Hispanic or Latino of any race.

There were 5,670 households, out of which 27.1% had children under the age of 18 living with them, 52.7% were married couples living together, 12.8% had a female householder with no husband present, and 29.8% were non-families. 27.2% of all households were made up of individuals, and 11.8% had someone living alone who was 65 years of age or older. The average household size was 2.41 and the average family size was 2.92.

In the county, the population was spread out, with 22.6% under the age of 18, 7.8% from 18 to 24, 23.8% from 25 to 44, 28.3% from 45 to 64, and 17.6% who were 65 years of age or older. The median age was 42 years. For every 100 females, there were 96.3 males. For every 100 females age 18 and over, there were 96.4 males age 18 and over.

The median income for a household in the county was $35,595, and the median income for a family was $43,392. Males had a median income of $32,382 versus $30,000 for females. The per capita income for the county was $18,332. About 18.5% of families and 18.8% of the population were below the poverty line, including 21.1% of those under age 18 and 15.4% of those age 65 or over.

== Education ==
Clay County contains one public school district. There are approximately 1,800 students in public PK-12 schools in Clay County.

=== Districts ===
School districts include:

- Clay County School District

== Government ==
Clay County is governed by a five-member Board of Commissioners: Commissioner Morrison, Commissioner Harris, Commissioner Denny, Commissioner Milstead and Commissioner Burney. Within Clay County are two principal cities, Ashland and Lineville.

Legislators for the county are Rep. Richard Laird for State of Alabama House, District 37. Sen. Gerald Dial State of Alabama Senate, District 13. The U.S. Representatives are Rep. Mike Rogers (R-AL), 3rd District, Sen. Tommy Tuberville and Sen. Katie Britt.

Clay County is reliably Republican at the presidential level. The last Democrat to win the county in a presidential election is Jimmy Carter, who won it by a plurality in 1980, even as he narrowly lost the state of Alabama to Ronald Reagan.

United States presidential election results for Clay County, Alabama
Year	Republican		Democratic		Third party(ies)	
Year	No.	%	No.	%	No.	%
1904	990	41.61%	1,345	56.54%	44	1.85%
1908	594	39.76%	863	57.76%	37	2.48%
1912	64	3.03%	1,109	52.46%	941	44.51%
1916	677	36.07%	1,196	63.72%	4	0.21%
1920	2,133	49.59%	2,165	50.34%	3	0.07%
1924	1,017	38.13%	1,597	59.88%	53	1.99%
1928	1,889	65.86%	978	34.10%	1	0.03%
1932	931	30.40%	2,103	68.68%	28	0.91%
1936	700	23.51%	2,138	71.79%	140	4.70%
1940	854	28.25%	2,153	71.22%	16	0.53%
1944	741	32.36%	1,535	67.03%	14	0.61%
1948	387	25.77%	0	0.00%	1,115	74.23%
1952	1,183	37.39%	1,972	62.33%	9	0.28%
1956	1,597	48.06%	1,677	50.47%	49	1.47%
1960	1,548	46.81%	1,743	52.71%	16	0.48%
1964	2,815	70.13%	0	0.00%	1,199	29.87%
1968	706	14.00%	256	5.08%	4,082	80.93%
1972	3,948	88.24%	507	11.33%	19	0.42%
1976	1,883	38.76%	2,946	60.64%	29	0.60%
1980	2,764	48.09%	2,858	49.73%	125	2.18%
1984	3,432	68.19%	1,456	28.93%	145	2.88%
1988	3,496	66.74%	1,602	30.58%	140	2.67%
1992	2,859	49.68%	2,073	36.02%	823	14.30%
1996	2,694	48.38%	2,306	41.42%	568	10.20%
2000	3,719	63.22%	2,045	34.76%	119	2.02%
2004	4,624	70.32%	1,893	28.79%	59	0.90%
2008	4,984	73.09%	1,760	25.81%	75	1.10%
2012	4,817	72.12%	1,777	26.61%	85	1.27%
2016	5,245	79.18%	1,237	18.67%	142	2.14%
2020	5,601	80.82%	1,267	18.28%	62	0.89%
2024	5,734	84.73%	993	14.67%	40	0.59%

United States Senate election results for Clay County, Alabama2
Year	Republican		Democratic		Third party(ies)	
Year	No.	%	No.	%	No.	%
2020	5,454	79.01%	1,441	20.87%	8	0.12%

United States Senate election results for Clay County, Alabama3
Year	Republican		Democratic		Third party(ies)	
Year	No.	%	No.	%	No.	%
2022	3,628	85.71%	505	11.93%	100	2.36%

Alabama Gubernatorial election results for Clay County
Year	Republican		Democratic		Third party(ies)	
Year	No.	%	No.	%	No.	%
2022	3,638	85.70%	480	11.31%	127	2.99%

== Communities ==
=== City ===
- Lineville

=== Town ===
- Ashland (county seat)

=== Census-designated places ===
- Delta
- Hollins
- Millerville

=== Unincorporated communities ===
- Brownsville
- Cleveland Crossroads
- Corinth
- Cragford
- Pinckneyville
- Springhill

== Notable people ==
- Hugo Black (1886–1971), born in Harlan, served as an associate justice of the U.S. Supreme Court from 1937 until 1971
- LaFayette L. Patterson (1888–1987), born near Delta, served three terms in the U.S. Congress from 1928 to 1933
- Byron Lavoy Cockrell (1935–2007), born in Lineville, rocket scientist and engineer
- Bob Riley (b. 1944), U.S. Congressman and Alabama's 52nd governor, native of Ashland
- Flem Walker (b. 1964), former United States Army lieutenant general, native of Lineville

== Places of interest ==
Clay County is home to parts of Cheaha State Park in the Talladega National Forest and Lake Wedowee on the eastern boundary. Outdoor adventures abound in Clay County and the surrounding area. The Pinhoti Trail system weaves its way through the Talladega National Forest to Mt. Cheaha, the highest point in Alabama. Hikers along the trail may spy some of the local wildlife, including whitetail deer, wild turkey, and the rare bald eagle.

Home of Doc Hilt Trails for Off-Highway Vehicles. On May 5, 2010, Doc Hilt Trails was awarded the distinction of being a National Recreation Trail. One of only two private motorized parks in the nation to ever be awarded the NRT designation.

Clay County has two sites listed on the National Register of Historic Places, the Hugo Black House (destroyed, but still listed) and the Clay County Courthouse.

== See also ==
- National Register of Historic Places listings in Clay County, Alabama
- Properties on the Alabama Register of Landmarks and Heritage in Clay County, Alabama
