= Springhill, Alabama =

Unincorporated community in Brownsville, Alabama

- Unincorporated community
- Location within Alabama Location within the United States
- Coordinates: 33°18′37″N 85°55′19″W
- Country: United States
- State: Alabama
- County: Clay
- Elevation: 1,142 ft (348 m)
- Time zone: UTC-6 (Central (CST))
  - Summer (DST): UTC-5 (CDT)
- Area codes: 256 & 938
- GNIS feature ID: 160660

Springhill is an unincorporated community in Clay County, Alabama, United States.
