= Raymond Eugene Brown =

American serial killer

- Born: January 11, 1946; Ashland, Alabama, U.S.
- Died: 2008 (aged 61/62); Alabama, U.S.
- Status: Deceased
- Convictions: Capital murder (2 counts); First degree murder (3 counts); Assault
- Penalty: Death

Details
- Victims: 5
- Span of crimes: 1960–1987
- Country: United States
- State: Alabama
- Date apprehended: For the final time on August 12, 1987

Raymond Eugene Brown (January 11, 1946 – 2008) was an American serial killer and rapist who killed his live-in girlfriend and her daughter in 1987, shortly after being paroled for the murder of three relatives in 1960, when he was 14. He was sentenced to death for the latter murders, and died on death row in 2008.

== Biography ==
Raymond Eugene Brown was born on January 11, 1946, in Ashland, Alabama, one of four boys born to Marvin and Emma Lou Brown. According to relatives and friends, he had a normal upbringing and happy childhood, regularly visited church and did not exhibit any worrying behavior. Brown attended the Clay County High School in his hometown, where he played for the junior varsity football team. He excelled in sports and was considered popular at school, with most acquaintances describing him in a positive manner.

== Triple murder ==
In the late evening of October 1, 1960, Brown broke into a home occupied by three of his relatives: 31-year-old aunt Berta Mae Martin, 63-year-old grandmother Ethel Ogle, and disabled 82-year-old great-grandmother Everlena Ogle via an unlocked back door, with the aim of stealing money to buy himself some cleats. While searching the house, he came across his aunt, who had awakened to investigate the noise coming from the kitchen. Upon being found out, Brown assaulted Martin and stabbed her a total of 123 times with a kitchen knife.

To eliminate potential witnesses, he entered the rooms of his grandmother and great-grandmother and stabbed both multiple times until he was sure they were dead. He then mutilated the bodies, slashing their throats from ear to ear. The bodies were discovered early the next morning by Brown's mother, who immediately called the police. While investigating the crime scene, officers discovered multiple bloody heel prints that they believed belonged to the teenager. They interviewed a number of his classmates, friends and acquaintances, some of whom claimed that Brown had told them he intended to visit his aunt and had supposedly gone there after soccer practice. Brown was detained five days later in the school gymnasium and taken to the local police station for questioning. He subsequently confessed, and recounted the circumstances and details of the crimes. His fingerprints also matched those found at the crime scene.

A few days after the murders, souvenir hunters attempted to break into the house and steal whatever they could. According to authorities, there were more than 600 cars from 18 counties around the state and even more from nine other states. An elderly neighbor tasked with guarding the house, 64-year-old J. W. Hester, was overwhelmed by the mob and shoved aside. He called the authorities, who dispersed the crowd. To prevent another such occurrence, officers were assigned to guard the house.

== Prosecution, sentence, and release ==
At the time, Alabama's criminal code allowed teenage defendants to be prosecuted as adults, and on October 10, the Clay County Prosecutor's Office and the district attorney met to decide how to proceed. Brown's attorney petitioned for his client to be tried in juvenile court, while prosecutors demanded that he be tried as an adult, which would have made him eligible for the death penalty. Eventually, it was decided that Brown would be tried as an adult, and he was ordered to undergo a psychiatric evaluation at the Bryce Hospital in Tuscaloosa. A few months later, he was deemed mentally competent to stand trial. At trial, the court was packed with curious onlookers, while Brown seemed emotionless, occasionally covering his face with his hands.

Due to the overwhelming amount of evidence against him, including witness testimony, material evidence and his own admissions, Brown was swiftly convicted. Rather than the death penalty, he was given three life sentences after the jury recommended mercy. He expressed no visible emotion during the sentencing phase.

During his incarceration, Brown studied to become an auto mechanic and participated in a number of inmate rehabilitation programs, for which he earned a reputation as a model prisoner. This led to his parole in 1973. He returned to Ashland, where he lived at his mother's house for some time. Soon after, Brown moved to Montgomery, where he found work at a local autoshop and rented an apartment.

=== Sexual assault, incarceration, and release ===
In the late 1970s, Brown developed an addiction to alcohol, which greatly affected his lifestyle. While intoxicated, he would sexually harass women and girls in Montgomery. In 1980, he raped his apartment manager and attempted to strangle her, rendering her unconscious. Believing that she was dead, Brown left the scene. When the woman regained consciousness, she contacted the authorities, who apprehended Brown soon afterward. As he had violated the conditions of his parole, he was returned to prison, where he remained for the next six years before being granted parole again in June 1986. Upon his release, he returned to Montgomery and found work at another autoshop.

== Association with Linda LeMonte and subsequent killings ==
Sometime in late 1986, Brown became acquainted with 31-year-old Linda LeMonte, a single mother of two children. The pair soon became intimate, with Brown moving into her home in early summer 1987. During this time, he reportedly ceased all aggressive behavior and was considered an upstanding citizen by friends and relatives alike.

On the evening of August 9, 1987, Brown attacked LeMonte in their shared home, stabbing her multiple times in the vagina, rectum and chest before making a nine-inch incision on her throat. He then sliced open her abdomen, making a 27-inch incision from the lower neck to the right side of her pubis. He then went into the bedroom of her daughter, ten-year-old Sheila Smoke, and raped her, before stabbing her multiple times in the chest, throat, and abdomen, leaving the murder weapon inside her body. LeMonte's six-year-old son Aaron, who was also in the home at the time, was not harmed.

Brown took a picture of LeMonte's corpse with a Polaroid camera and attached the photograph to the TV screen, before scattering playing cards around the bodies and leaving a piece of paper with his victims' names and the word "me" written on them. When LeMonte failed to show up at work and her children at school, her parents went to her apartment, where they found the bodies and Aaron. During the preliminary investigation, police interviewed LeMonte's ex-husband, David, who told them that Brown was at the house when he brought Aaron over. On the basis of his testimony, in addition to evidence recovered from the crime scene, Brown was put on a wanted list.

== Arrest ==
After issuing an arrest warrant, police determined that prior to their discovery of the bodies, Brown had been involved in a traffic accident in Wallsboro, Elmore County. When traffic police arrived at the scene, he gave them his driver's license and described what had happened, declining medical attention. He then retrieved a bag of groceries and a fishing rod from the trunk of the car and proceeded to the nearby lake, after which his car was towed to the parking lot.

On August 12, the Montgomery County Sheriff's Department, in conjunction with several other law enforcement agencies, began a massive search for Brown. They focused their efforts in a sparsely populated, heavily wooded area on the east side of Jordan Lake, about 15 miles north of Montgomery, from where about 140 vacationers were evacuated. Brown was arrested that same afternoon after he walked out of the woods to a gas station where he bought cigarettes and a soft drink. Station employees noticed his unkempt appearance and contacted police. He did not resist arrest, and after examining his clothing and the interior of his car, authorities found drops of blood. A forensic examination later determined that the blood type matched LeMonte's.

== Trial ==
Brown pleaded not guilty to the murders, claiming that he had amnesia and could not remember what had happened on the night of August 9. He was ordered to undergo a psychiatric evaluation, which determined that he had an "organic personality disorder", but was otherwise sane. He was found guilty on all counts and sentenced to death on May 13, 1988. After his conviction, he was transferred to the Holman Correctional Facility's death row to await execution.

== Appeals and status ==
Over the next few years, Brown and his attorneys filed a number of appeals in an effort to delay the execution date and to have the sentence overturned. In 1990, he appealed on the grounds that his initial trial had several procedural errors, insisting that there were irregularities in the jury selection process. Because of the pre-trial publicity and the public outcry that the case generated, 42 of the 66 potential jurors replied that they were aware to some extent of the crimes. Brown provided the court with 53 newspaper articles describing the murders and his past criminal record.

His appeal was eventually granted and his sentence was overturned. However, the Montgomery County Prosecutor's Office cross-appealed to the Supreme Court, which subsequently reversed the appellate court's decision and affirmed the death sentence. The appellate court later reinstated the decision and sent the case for further review.

At the follow-up trial, Brown was again found guilty on all counts and resentenced to death. In 1995, his attorneys filed another appeal, claiming that the court demonstrated racial and social bias and failed to provide compelling reasons for denying potential jurors. The circuit court determined that there was no factual evidence to these claims and promptly dismissed the appeal. Brown later attempted to appeal to the Supreme Court of Alabama, which upheld the appellate court's ruling.

In the late 1990s, Brown's attorneys filed yet another appeal, this time arguing that their client had been denied the constitutional right to participate in the jury selection process. They also claimed to have found other irregularities, including a juror who had provided false information. The appellate court found no factual basis for these claims and that they ultimately did not affect Brown's guilt. All of his subsequent appeals, ranging from ineffective counsel to the death penalty being cruel and unusual punishment, were also dismissed.

Brown died on death row in 2008.

== See also ==
- Capital punishment in Alabama
- List of serial killers in the United States
- List of youngest killers

== Bibliography ==
- Bob Curlee (March 31, 2016). The Path of a Psychopath, Alabama's Teenage Serial Killer, Raymond Eugene Brown. CreateSpace Independent Publishing Platform. ISBN 978-1530367979.
