= Brownsville, Alabama =

Unincorporated community in Alabama, United States

- Unincorporated community
- Location within Alabama Location within the United States
- Coordinates: 33°07′33″N 86°02′50″W
- Country: United States
- State: Alabama
- County: Clay
- Elevation: 761 ft (232 m)
- Time zone: UTC-6 (Central (CST))
  - Summer (DST): UTC-5 (CDT)
- Area codes: 256 & 938
- GNIS feature ID: 159254

Brownsville is an unincorporated community in Clay County, Alabama, United States.

== History ==
Brownsville is named for the first two elders of the Brownsville Presbyterian Church, Duncan and John Brown. The area was first settled by pioneers from the Cape Fear region of North Carolina. At one point, there was a school, three general stores, and two grist mills in Brownsville. A post office operated under the name Brownsville from 1872 to 1874.

The Hatchett Creek Presbyterian Church is listed on the Alabama Register of Landmarks and Heritage.
