= Alabama State Route 149 =

State highway in Alabama, United States

State Route 149

Route information
- Maintained by ALDOT
- Length: 4.090 mi (6.582 km)

Major junctions
- South end: US 280 southwest of Mountain Brook
- US 31 in Homewood; I-65 in Birmingham
- North end: Lakeshore Parkway in Homewood, Alabama

Location
- Country: United States
- State: Alabama
- Counties: Jefferson

Highway system
- Alabama State Highway System; Interstate; US; State
← SR 148	→ SR 150

State Route 149 (SR 149) is a 4.090-mile-long (6.582 km) state highway that connects the south suburbs of Mountain Brook and Homewood south of downtown Birmingham, in the central part of the U.S. state of Alabama. It formerly was in the shape of the letter C. Before the completion of Interstate 65 (I-65), SR 149 was the truck route of U.S. Route 31 (US 31) and US 280.

== Route description ==
The signed southern terminus of SR 149 is at a folded diamond-type interchange with US 280 (internally designated as SR 38) just southwest of Mountain Brook. Although signed as a north–south highway, it initially travels to the southwest along Shades Creek Parkway. The highway passes Colonial Brookwood Village, at one time one of the larger shopping malls in the Birmingham metro area before its closure, and then enters Homewood, whereupon Shades Creek Parkway intersects US 31 (Montgomery Highway; internally designated as SR 3) at a cloverleaf interchange and the name of the road changes to Lakeshore Drive. Along Lakeshore Drive, SR 149 passes the campus of Samford University.

At the intersection of Lakeshore Drive and Green Springs Highway, SR 149 formerly turned to the north-northwest and was routed along Green Springs Highway, continuing in Homewood until the route crossed the crest of Red Mountain, where the route entered the city limits of Birmingham. SR 149 closely paralleled I-65 for approximately 4 miles (6.4 km) until it approached the campus of the University of Alabama at Birmingham (UAB). Here the state route had an interchange with I-65, although there were no trailblazers on I-65 indicating that the two routes junctioned. Near this interchange, the name of Green Springs Highway changes to University Boulevard and northbound SR 149 curved to the northeast.

After the interchange with I-65, SR 149 passed through the heart of the UAB campus. Bartow Arena, home of the UAB Blazers basketball teams, is located less than 0.25 miles (0.40 km) north of the former route of SR 149. In addition, Regions Field, the home of the Birmingham Barons minor league baseball team is less than 1 mile (1.6 km) north of the former route of the highway.

SR 149 also provided direct access to several Birmingham-area hospitals, including UAB Hospital and Children's of Alabama. East of the UAB campus and the hospitals, SR 149 continued approximately 0.75 miles (1.21 km) until it reached its northern terminus at a folded-diamond interchange with US 31/US 280 (Elton B. Stephens Expressway). There were no signs on US 31 south/US 280 east to alert motorists that they were meeting SR 149; however, signs on US 31 north/US 280 west informed motorists of the interchange with the highway. The SR 149 shields were covered when the route was truncated in 2019.

The northern terminus of SR 149 was truncated in May 2015, with the route ending at the intersection of Lakeshore Drive and Green Springs Highway in Homewood. The route was extended along Lakeshore Drive/Parkway in June 2019 to its current terminus at the city limits of Homewood and Birmingham. While the route is signed north from its junction with US 280, it actually travels southwestwardly for the whole of its current route.

== Major intersections ==
The entire route is in Jefferson County.

Location	mi	km	Destinations	Notes
	0.000	0.000	US 280 (SR 38) – Sylacauga, Birmingham	Southern terminus; interchange
Homewood	0.714	1.149	US 31 (SR 3) – Montgomery, Birmingham	Interchange
Homewood	3.370	5.423	I-65 – Montgomery, Birmingham	I-65 exit 255
Homewood	4.090	6.582	Lakeshore Parkway	SR 149 terminates at the Homewood-Birmingham city limits. Lakeshore Parkway continues southwestardly to Bessemer.
1.000 mi = 1.609 km; 1.000 km = 0.621 mi
