= Cragford, Alabama =

Unincorporated community in Brownsville, Alabama

- Unincorporated community
- Location within Alabama Location within the United States
- Coordinates: 33°15′03″N 85°40′21″W
- Country: United States
- State: Alabama
- County: Clay
- Elevation: 860 ft (260 m)
- Time zone: UTC-6 (Central (CST))
  - Summer (DST): UTC-5 (CDT)
- ZIP code: 36255
- Area codes: 256 & 938
- GNIS feature ID: 164043

Cragford is an unincorporated community in Clay County, Alabama, United States, located 6.3 miles (10.1 km) southeast of Lineville. Cragford has a post office with ZIP code 36255.
