= WFAZ =

- Ashland, Alabama; United States
- Broadcast area: Ashland, Alabama
- Frequency: 90.9 MHz
- Branding: Classic Country 90.9

Programming
- Language: English
- Format: Classic country

Ownership
- Owner: RadioAlabama Foundation; (RadioAlabama Foundation)

History
- First air date: 2024
- Former call signs: WTXN (2008–2010); WQLS (2010)

Technical information
- Licensing authority: FCC
- Facility ID: 159021
- Class: C3
- ERP: 6,900 watts
- HAAT: 136 meters (446 ft)

Links
- Public license information: Public file; LMS
- Webcast: streamdb4web.securenetsystems.net/cirruscontent/wfaz
- Website: www.classiccountry909.org

WFAZ (90.9 FM, "Classic Country 90.9 - WFAZ") is an American radio station licensed to Goodwater, Ala., with studios in Ashland and Sylacauga. The station airs classic country music and is home to Central High School of Clay County Volunteer Athletics.

The station was assigned the call sign "WFAZ" by the Federal Communications Commission (FCC) on August 18, 2010.
