= Red Mountain Expressway Cut =

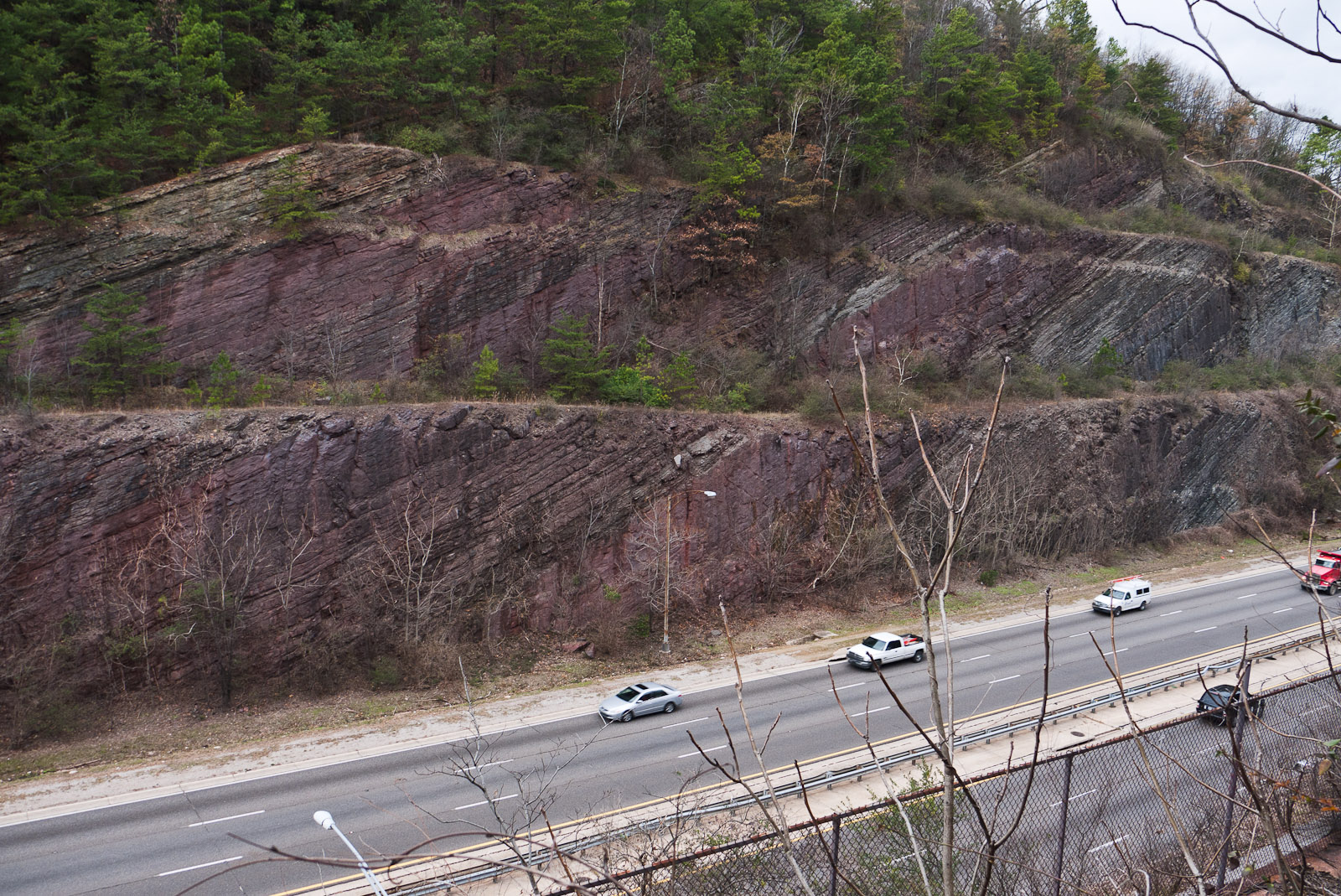
- Looking east across the Red Mountain Expressway Cut.

- Location within Alabama
- Location: Birmingham, Alabama
- Coordinates: 33°29′46″N 86°47′17″W
- Area: 8 acres (3.2 ha)

U.S. National Natural Landmark
- Designated: 1987

The Red Mountain Expressway Cut, also known as the Red Mountain Geological Cut, is a section of Red Mountain that was blasted and removed in the 1960s to allow the Red Mountain Expressway to enter downtown Birmingham, Alabama. The highway links Birmingham with its southern suburbs of Homewood, Mountain Brook, and Vestavia Hills. It has spurred suburban growth towards the south of Birmingham. This section also provides the route for US 31 to the south (the Montgomery Highway) and US 280 to the southeast.

The resultant cut exposes geological strata spanning millions of years (150 million years of geological time within 650 feet or 200 metres of exposure), including the red ore seam that spurred Birmingham's development. A new species of Lower Silurian (middle Llandovery epoch) phacopsid trilobite, Acaste birminghamensis, was first collected from exposures on Red Mountain. Named for the city, the new species was published in May 1972.

The cut was designated a National Natural Landmark in 1987.

== Proposed tunnel ==
One of the original ideas proposed for linking Birmingham to its southern neighbors was the Red Mountain Tunnel project. Two alternate routes were proposed, one starting at 18th Street and the other from 22nd Street. The tunnel idea was eventually abandoned due to its high cost and the extended amount of time it would have taken, resulting in the Red Mountain Expressway Cut being built instead.

== See also ==
- Birmingham District
