= Elton B. Stephens Expressway =

Freeway in Alabama

Elton B. Stephens Expressway
- Red Mountain Expressway

Route information
- Maintained by ALDOT
- Length: 2.6 mi (4.2 km)
- Existed: April 16, 1970–present
- Component highways: US 31; US 280

Major junctions
- South end: US 31 / US 280 in Homewood
- US 78 in Birmingham; US 11 in Birmingham
- North end: I-20 / I-59 / US 31 / US 280 in Birmingham

Location
- Country: United States
- State: Alabama
- Counties: Jefferson

Highway system
- United States Numbered Highway System; List; Special; Divided; Alabama State Highway System; Interstate; US; State

The Elton B. Stephens Expressway, more commonly referred to locally as the Red Mountain Expressway, is a limited-access freeway serving as a north–south connection between Homewood and Mountain Brook south of Red Mountain with I-20/I-59 just to the northeast of downtown Birmingham. It was named for local businessman and philanthropist Elton Bryson Stephens, Sr., who chaired the Birmingham and Jefferson County Freeway and Expressway Committee. The expressway was largely built over the former path of 26th Street North and South. It runs through the Red Mountain Expressway Cut, designated a National Historic Landmark in 1987.

The freeway generally carries three lanes for travel in each direction and carries traffic for both US 31 and US 280. From its southern terminus to University Boulevard, the freeway is mostly at-grade. Between University Boulevard and its northern terminus, the freeway is elevated.

== History ==
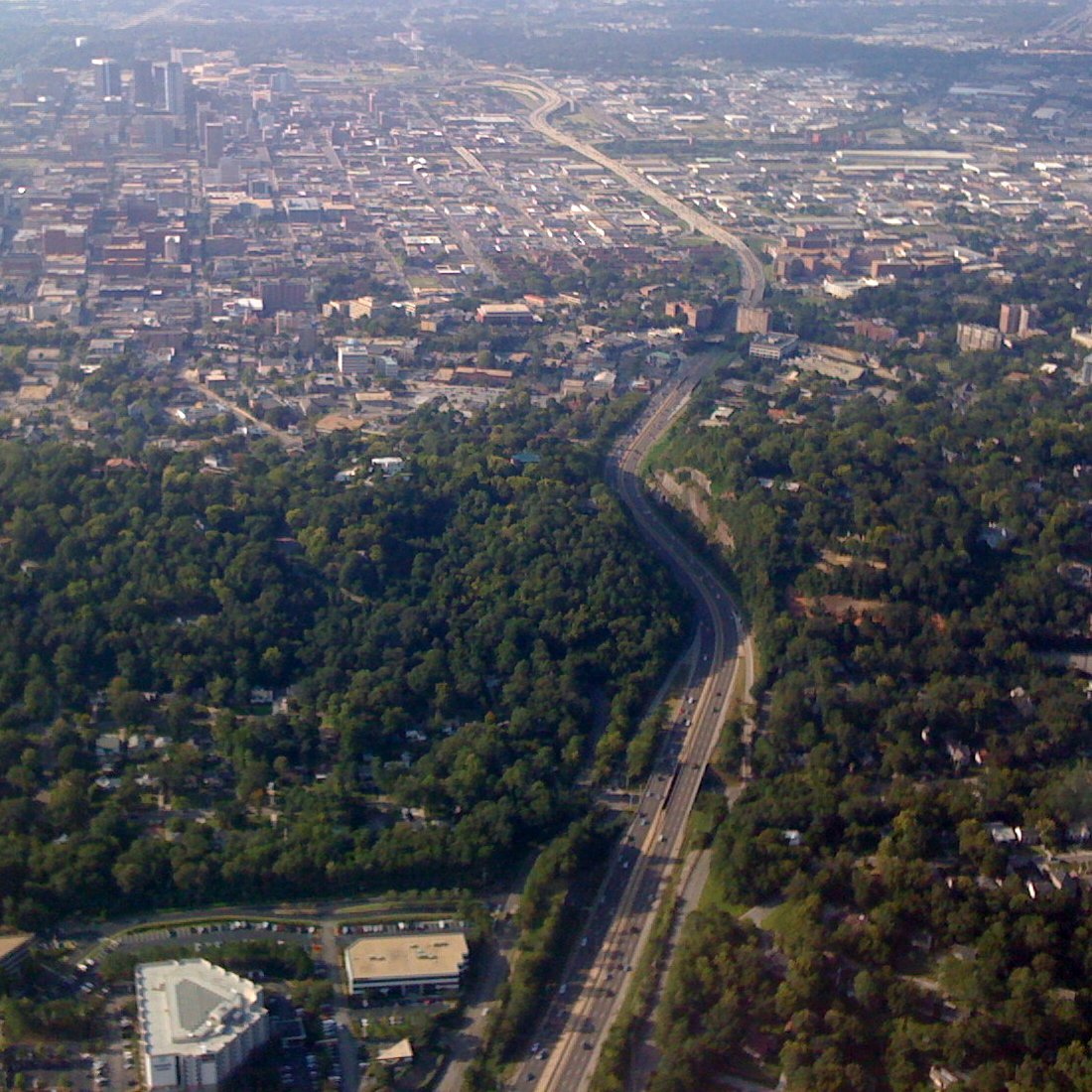
Aerial image of the expressway

Construction commenced in 1963 with the initial blasting of the Red Mountain Expressway Cut and construction of the interchange with US 280. The latter work was delayed by intransigence from the Jefferson County Board of Education, which denied crews access to the Shades Valley High School campus until the Alabama Department of Transportation secured replacement land for that the one that was condemned for highway use.

The Highland Avenue overpass was completed in January 1967. The cut was completed later that year, and the highway opened on April 16, 1970. Originally ending at 2nd Avenue South, its connection with I-20/I-59 and Carraway Boulevard was completed in the 1980s over the site of Birmingham's grand Terminal Station, which had been demolished in 1969.

When the expressway was originally constructed, a cloverleaf exit was constructed at 1st Avenue North for southbound traffic. An on-ramp was constructed over the cloverleaf and used in the 1970s but was later removed. Currently, although the cloverleaf exit exists, it is closed to traffic. In the months leading up to 1996 Olympics soccer being hosted in Legion Field, the Olympic soccer countdown clock was located on the Highland Avenue overpass.

In 2020, a countdown clock was placed in the same position counting down to the 2021 World Games to be hosted in Birmingham. When the 2020 Tokyo Olympics were delayed by COVID-19, the World Games were delayed until 2022, with 365 days added to the clock. ALDOT conducted infrastructural improvements on the freeway in advance of the World Games, with the first phase of construction completed in May 2022.

== Exit list ==
The entire route is in Jefferson County. All exits are unnumbered.

.

Location	mi	km	Destinations	Notes
Homewood	0.0	0.0	US 31 south (Independence Drive) / US 280 east (Old Florida Short Route) – Birmingham Zoo, Birmingham Botanical Gardens	Southern terminus; southern end of US 31/US 280 concurrency; western terminus of unsigned SR 38
Birmingham	0.5	0.80	21st Avenue South – Homewood, Vulcan Park	Southbound exit and northbound entrance
Birmingham	0.8	1.3	Highland Avenue, Arlington Avenue	Northbound exit and southbound entrance
Birmingham	1.5	2.4	SR 149 (University Boulevard) – UAB, St. Vincent's Hospital	
Birmingham	1.8	2.9	US 78 (SR 4 / 3rd Avenue South / 4th Avenue South)	
Birmingham	2.1	3.4	US 11 (SR 7 / 1st Avenue North / 2nd Avenue North)	Northbound exit and southbound entrance
Birmingham	2.3	3.7	2nd Avenue North	Northbound exit and southbound entrance
Birmingham	2.6	4.2	I-20 / I-59 / US 31 north / US 280 east – Tuscaloosa, Atlanta, Gadsden	I-20/59 exit 126A; northern terminus of expressway, northern end of US 31/US 280 concurrency; western terminus of US 280
1.000 mi = 1.609 km; 1.000 km = 0.621 mi: Concurrency terminus; Incomplete access
