= Clay County Courthouse (Alabama) =

- U.S. National Register of Historic Places
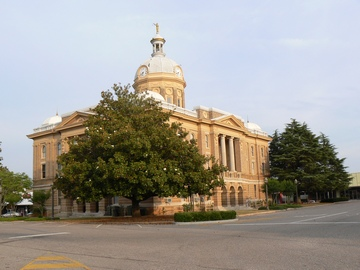

- Location within Alabama Location within the United States
- Interactive map showing the location of Clay County Courthouse
- Location: Courthouse Sq., Ashland, Alabama
- Coordinates: 33°16′27″N 85°50′9″W
- Area: 2.1 acres (0.85 ha)
- Built: 1906
- Architect: C.W. Carleton
- Architectural style: Classical Revival
- NRHP reference No.: 76000316
- Added to NRHP: November 21, 1976

The Clay County Courthouse is a historic courthouse building in Ashland, Alabama, United States. The Classical Revival-style building has served as the county courthouse since its completion in 1906. Notable characteristics include its large dome, with clocks inset on four sides, and cupola surmounted by a statuary representing justice. It was added to the National Register of Historic Places on November 21, 1976.
