= Millerville, Alabama =

- Census-designated place
- Location of Millerville in Clay County, Alabama
- Coordinates: 33°11′33″N 85°55′49″W
- Country: United States
- State: Alabama
- County: Clay

Area
  - Total: 6.72 sq mi (17.41 km^{2})
  - Land: 6.70 sq mi (17.35 km^{2})
  - Water: 0.023 sq mi (0.06 km^{2})
- Elevation: 807 ft (246 m)

Population (2020)
  - Total: 303
  - Density: 45.2/sq mi (17.46/km^{2})
- Time zone: UTC-6 (Central (CST))
  - Summer (DST): UTC-5 (CDT)
- Area codes: 256/938
- GNIS feature ID: 2582687

Millerville is a census-designated place and unincorporated community in Clay County, Alabama, United States. Its population was 303 as of the 2020 census.

== Demographics ==
Historical population
Census	Pop.	Note	%±
2010	278		—
2020	303		9.0%
U.S. Decennial Census

Millerville was listed as a census designated place in the 2010 U.S. census.

Millerville CDP, Alabama – Racial and ethnic composition Note: the US Census treats Hispanic/Latino as an ethnic category. This table excludes Latinos from the racial categories and assigns them to a separate category. Hispanics/Latinos may be of any race.
Race / Ethnicity (NH = Non-Hispanic)	Pop 2010	Pop 2020	% 2010	% 2020
White alone (NH)	255	288	91.73%	95.05%
Black or African American alone (NH)	21	8	7.55%	2.64%
Native American or Alaska Native alone (NH)	0	0	0.00%	0.00%
Asian alone (NH)	2	1	0.72%	0.33%
Native Hawaiian or Pacific Islander alone (NH)	0	0	0.00%	0.00%
Other race alone (NH)	0	0	0.00%	0.00%
Mixed race or Multiracial (NH)	0	5	0.00%	1.65%
Hispanic or Latino (any race)	0	1	0.00%	0.33%
Total	278	303	100.00%	100.00%
