= Pinckneyville, Alabama =

Unincorporated community in Brownsville, Alabama

- Unincorporated community
- Location within Alabama Location within the United States
- Coordinates: 33°06′24″N 85°57′33″W
- Country: United States
- State: Alabama
- County: Clay
- Elevation: 761 ft (232 m)
- Time zone: UTC-6 (Central (CST))
  - Summer (DST): UTC-5 (CDT)
- Area codes: 256 & 938
- GNIS feature ID: 156888

Pinckneyville, also spelled as Pinkneyville, is an unincorporated community in Clay County, Alabama, United States.

== History ==
Pinckneyville was named in honor of Thomas Pinckney. At one point, Pinckneyville was home to two churches, a general store, two grist mills, and a cotton gin. A group of men from Pinckneyville were mustered into Hilliard's Legion. A post office operated under the name Pinckneyville from 1840 to 1903.

A type of granodiorite known as Pinckneyville granite is found in the area and named for Pinckneyville.
