= Ashland, Alabama =

City in and county seat of Clay County, Alabama

- City
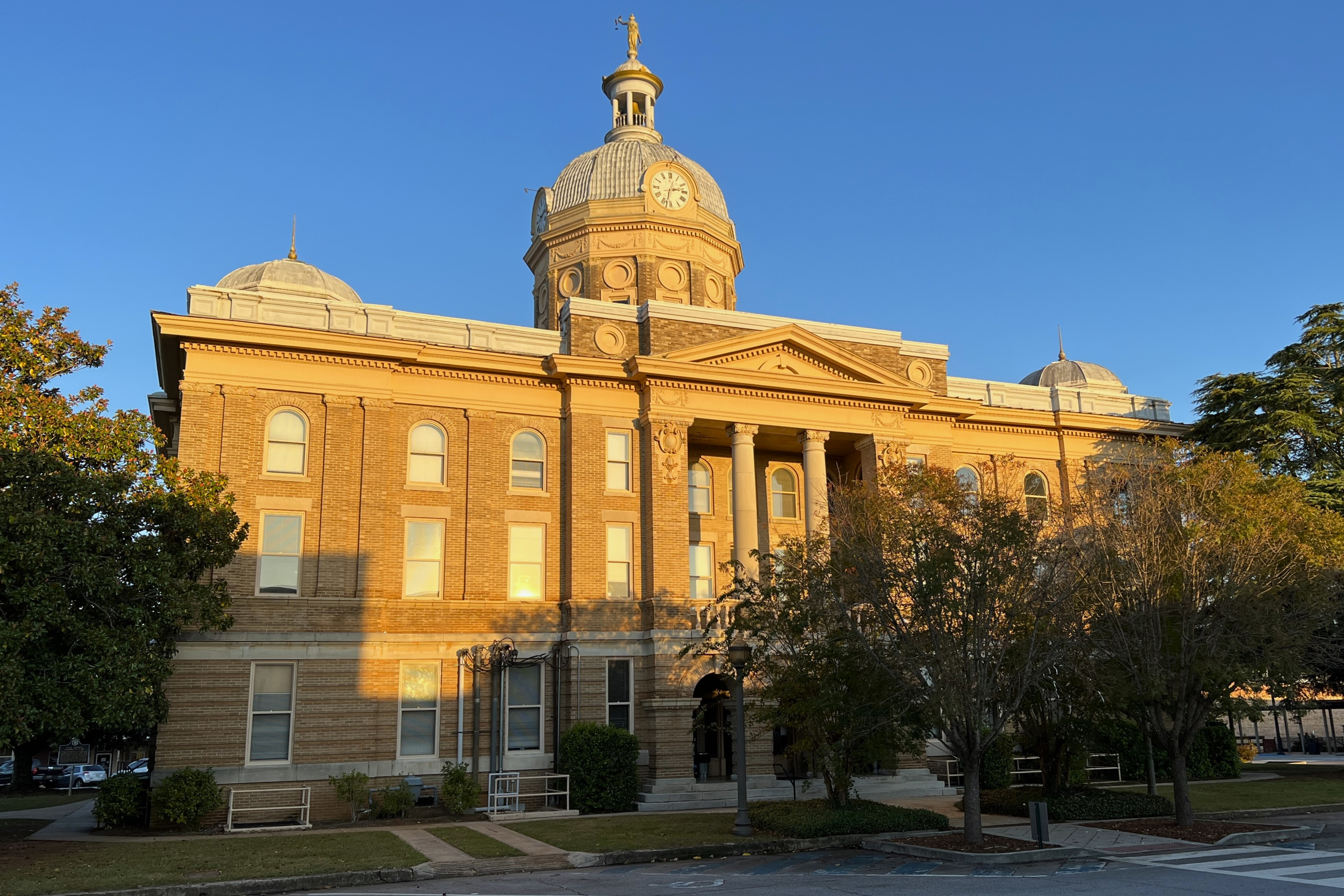
- Clay County Courthouse in Ashland. The Classical Revival-style building has served as county courthouse since its completion in 1906.

- Location of Ashland in Clay County, Alabama.
- Coordinates: 33°16′12″N 85°50′25″W
- Country: United States
- State: Alabama
- County: Clay
- Settled: 1867
- Incorporated: 1871
- Named for: Henry Clay's estate

Government
  - Type: Mayor/City Council

Area
  - Total: 7.38 sq mi (19.11 km^{2})
  - Land: 7.35 sq mi (19.03 km^{2})
  - Water: 0.035 sq mi (0.09 km^{2})
- Elevation: 1,122 ft (342 m)

Population (2020)
  - Total: 1,984
  - Density: 270.1/sq mi (104.28/km^{2})
- Time zone: UTC-6 (Central (CST))
  - Summer (DST): UTC-5 (CDT)
- ZIP code: 36251
- Area code: 256
- FIPS code: 01-02860
- GNIS feature ID: 2405173
- Website: http://www.cityofashland.net/

Ashland is a city in and the county seat of Clay County, Alabama, United States. The population was 2,037 at the 2010 census.

== History ==
Clay County was formed by an act of the Alabama General Assembly on December 7, 1866. Less than a year later, Ashland was established as the county seat on land donated by Hollingsworth Watts for the construction of a courthouse. In 1871 Ashland was incorporated and named for 19th century statesman Henry Clay's Kentucky estate home.

During the early years, the town grew very rapidly. The town continued to grow with the opening of Alabama's first graphite mine in 1899. When World War I ended, the market for graphite dropped drastically, thus ending the town's growth phase.

The 1930s brought the Great Depression and boll weevil to Ashland that destroyed the cotton industry. Farmers were forced to abandon what had been the community's major industry. Timber, poultry, and cabinet making became the dominant industries by the beginning of the 21st century.

== Geography ==
Alabama State Routes 9 and 77 are the main routes through the city. AL-9 runs through the downtown area, leading northeast 6 mi (9.7 km) to Lineville and southwest 20 mi (32 km) to Goodwater. AL-77 meets AL-9 in the downtown area, and leads northwest 24 mi (39 km) to Talladega and southeast 21 mi (34 km) to Wadley.

According to the U.S. Census Bureau, the city had a total area of 7.3 square miles (19 km^{2}), of which 7.2 square miles (19 km^{2}) is land and 0.04 square miles (0.10 km^{2}) (0.41%) is water.

At 1,130 feet (340 m), Ashland is Alabama's highest-elevated county seat.

=== Climate ===
The climate in this area is characterized by hot, humid summers and generally mild to cool winters. According to the Köppen Climate Classification system, Ashland has a humid subtropical climate, abbreviated "Cfa" on climate maps.

Climate data for Ashland, Alabama (1991–2020 normals, extremes 1957–2013)
Month	Jan	Feb	Mar	Apr	May	Jun	Jul	Aug	Sep	Oct	Nov	Dec	Year
Record high °F (°C)	77 (25)	80 (27)	88 (31)	91 (33)	94 (34)	102 (39)	106 (41)	103 (39)	97 (36)	91 (33)	85 (29)	78 (26)	106 (41)
Mean maximum °F (°C)	70.3 (21.3)	74.0 (23.3)	80.6 (27.0)	84.7 (29.3)	88.1 (31.2)	92.7 (33.7)	95.1 (35.1)	94.7 (34.8)	90.9 (32.7)	85.3 (29.6)	78.5 (25.8)	70.9 (21.6)	96.5 (35.8)
Mean daily maximum °F (°C)	54.9 (12.7)	59.0 (15.0)	66.9 (19.4)	74.4 (23.6)	80.8 (27.1)	87.2 (30.7)	89.8 (32.1)	88.9 (31.6)	84.3 (29.1)	75.8 (24.3)	65.5 (18.6)	57.1 (13.9)	73.7 (23.2)
Daily mean °F (°C)	43.0 (6.1)	46.4 (8.0)	53.2 (11.8)	60.5 (15.8)	68.0 (20.0)	75.0 (23.9)	78.3 (25.7)	77.5 (25.3)	72.1 (22.3)	62.3 (16.8)	51.9 (11.1)	45.1 (7.3)	61.1 (16.2)
Mean daily minimum °F (°C)	31.1 (−0.5)	33.8 (1.0)	39.5 (4.2)	46.6 (8.1)	55.2 (12.9)	62.8 (17.1)	66.8 (19.3)	66.0 (18.9)	59.9 (15.5)	48.7 (9.3)	38.3 (3.5)	33.2 (0.7)	48.5 (9.2)
Mean minimum °F (°C)	13.0 (−10.6)	17.8 (−7.9)	23.5 (−4.7)	30.4 (−0.9)	40.9 (4.9)	52.2 (11.2)	59.7 (15.4)	58.4 (14.7)	45.6 (7.6)	31.9 (−0.1)	24.5 (−4.2)	15.8 (−9.0)	9.4 (−12.6)
Record low °F (°C)	−7 (−22)	1 (−17)	8 (−13)	23 (−5)	33 (1)	42 (6)	51 (11)	51 (11)	34 (1)	26 (−3)	11 (−12)	1 (−17)	−7 (−22)
Average precipitation inches (mm)	6.09 (155)	6.02 (153)	6.03 (153)	4.67 (119)	4.64 (118)	4.63 (118)	4.75 (121)	5.11 (130)	3.50 (89)	3.77 (96)	4.85 (123)	5.64 (143)	59.70 (1,516)
Average snowfall inches (cm)	0.3 (0.76)	0.2 (0.51)	0.6 (1.5)	0.0 (0.0)	0.0 (0.0)	0.0 (0.0)	0.0 (0.0)	0.0 (0.0)	0.0 (0.0)	0.0 (0.0)	0.0 (0.0)	0.5 (1.3)	1.6 (4.1)
Average precipitation days (≥ 0.01 in)	11.3	10.4	10.6	9.5	9.5	11.5	12.5	10.8	8.3	7.7	8.7	10.5	121.3
Average snowy days (≥ 0.1 in)	0.3	0.2	0.2	0.0	0.0	0.0	0.0	0.0	0.0	0.0	0.0	0.3	1.0
Source: NOAA (mean maxima/minima 1981–2010)

== Demographics ==
Historical population
Census	Pop.	Note	%±
1870	118		—
1880	387		228.0%
1890	635		64.1%
1900	422		−33.5%
1910	1,062		151.7%
1920	1,655		55.8%
1930	1,476		−10.8%
1940	1,608		8.9%
1950	1,593		−0.9%
1960	1,610		1.1%
1970	1,921		19.3%
1980	2,052		6.8%
1990	2,034		−0.9%
2000	1,965		−3.4%
2010	2,037		3.7%
2020	1,984		−2.6%
U.S. Decennial Census

Ashland first appeared on the 1870 U.S. Census as an unincorporated village, incorporating as a town the following year. The 6th beat (precinct) of Clay County also bore the name of Ashland, and has continued to report to date (2010), becoming a census division in 1960. The population of the beat/precinct/census division is as follows: 1870–1,499; 1880–2,178; 1890–2,848; 1900–2,891; 1910–3,581; 1920–4,629; 1930–3,713; 1940–3,757; 1950–3,197; 1960–5,696; 1970–5,852; 1980–6,167; 1990–5,780; 2000–6,515; 2010–6,128. From 1870 to 1950, Ashland was also the largest community in Clay County. It lost that distinction to Lineville beginning in 1960, when the latter eclipsed Ashland by just 2 people (1,612 to 1,610).

=== Racial and ethnic composition ===
Ashland town, Alabama – Racial and ethnic composition Note: the US Census treats Hispanic/Latino as an ethnic category. This table excludes Latinos from the racial categories and assigns them to a separate category. Hispanics/Latinos may be of any race. Race and ethnicity were not surveyed for populations under 2,500 in 1980 and under 1,000 in 1990.
Race / Ethnicity (NH = Non-Hispanic)	Pop 1990	Pop 2000	Pop 2010	Pop 2020	% 1990	% 2000	% 2010	% 2020
White alone (NH)	1,525	1,409	1,398	1,309	74.98%	71.70%	68.63%	65.98%
Black or African American alone (NH)	501	491	478	503	24.63%	24.99%	23.47%	25.35%
Native American or Alaska Native alone (NH)	4	0	7	3	0.20%	0.00%	0.34%	0.15%
Asian alone (NH)	3	2	15	25	0.15%	0.10%	0.74%	1.26%
Native Hawaiian or Pacific Islander alone (NH)	x	0	0	1	x	0.00%	0.00%	0.05%
Other race alone (NH)	0	0	0	8	0.00%	0.00%	0.00%	0.40%
Mixed race or Multiracial (NH)	x	10	22	69	x	0.51%	1.08%	3.48%
Hispanic or Latino (any race)	1	53	117	66	0.05%	2.70%	5.74%	3.33%
Total	2,034	1,965	2,037	1,984	100.00%	100.00%	100.00%	100.00%

=== 2020 census data ===
As of the 2020 United States census, there were 1,984 people, 677 households, and 333 families residing in the town.

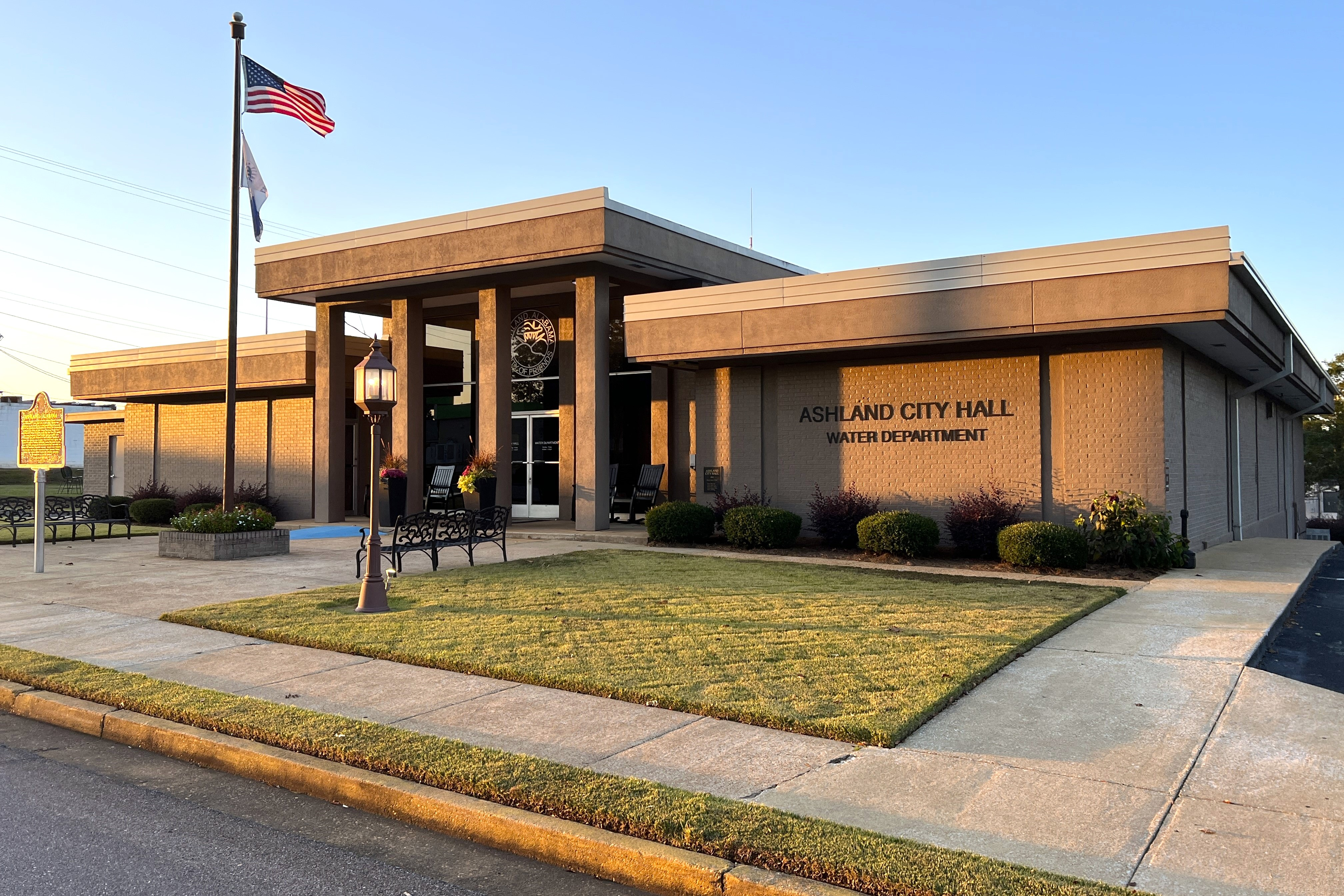
Ashland City Hall and Water Department

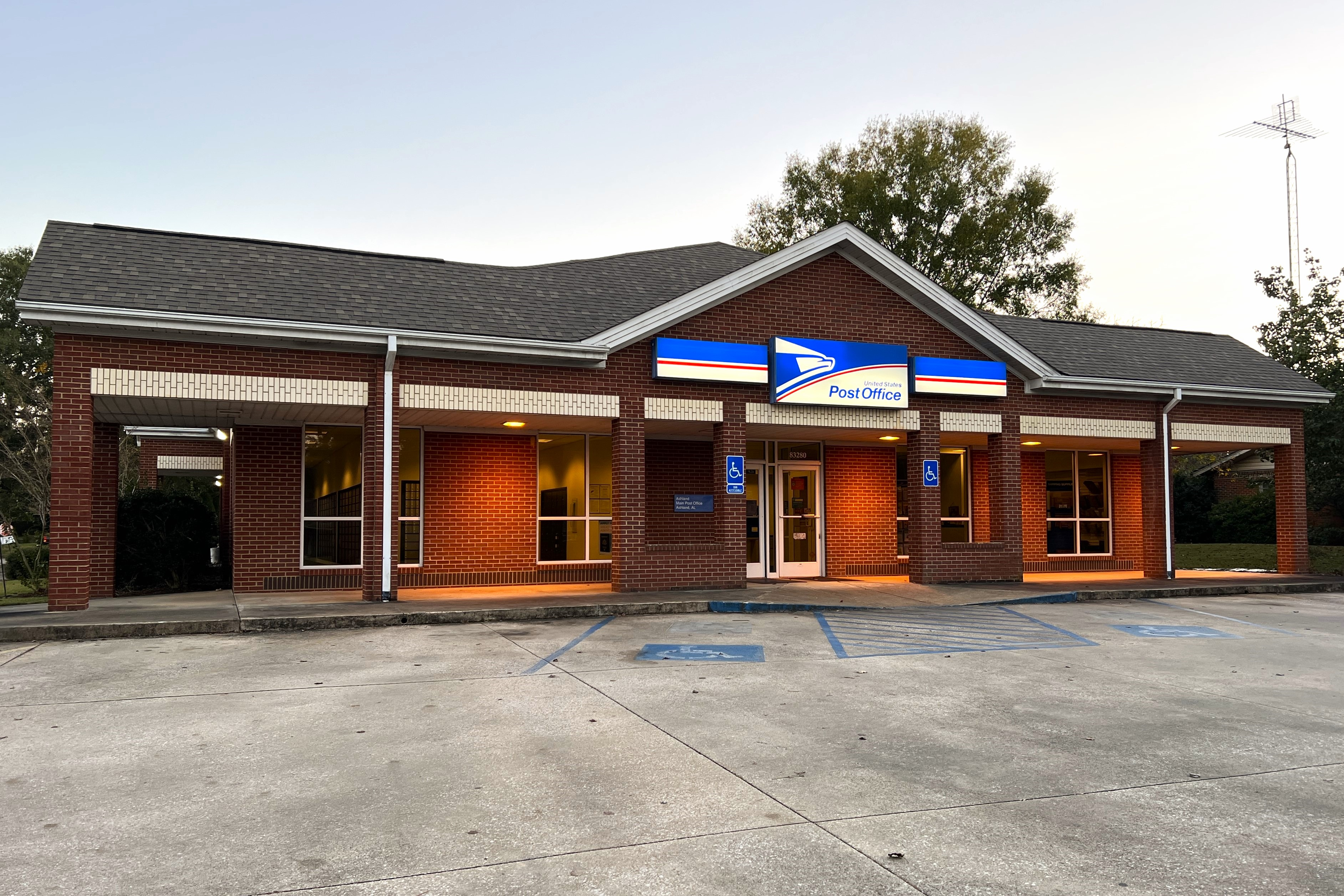
Ashland Post Office

=== 2010 census data ===
As of the census of 2010, there were 2,037 people, 849 households, and 516 families residing in the city. The population density was 272.9 inhabitants per square mile (105.4/km^{2}). There were 986 housing units at an average density of 135 per square mile (52/km^{2}). The racial makeup of the city was 71.5% White, 24.1% Black or African American, 0.7% Asian, 2.0% from other races, and 1.3% from two or more races. Hispanic or Latino of any race were 5.7% of the population.

There were 849 households, out of which 26.0% had children under the age of 18 living with them, 37.3% were married couples living together, 18.1% had a female householder with no husband present, and 39.2% were non-families. 37.2% of all households were made up of individuals, and 18.6% had someone living alone who was 65 years of age or older. The average household size was 2.22 and the average family size was 2.91.

In the city, the population was spread out, with 21.3% under the age of 18, 9.1% from 18 to 24, 24.3% from 25 to 44, 24.9% from 45 to 64, and 20.4% who were 65 years of age or older. The median age was 41.8 years. For every 100 females there were 84.8 males. For every 100 females age 18 and over, there were 90.1 males.

The median income for a household in the city was $30,759, and the median income for a family was $44,659. Males had a median income of $30,360 versus $29,438 for females. The per capita income for the city was $17,258. About 24.4% of families and 20.0% of the population were below the poverty line, including 7.9% of those under age 18 and 29.2 of those age 65 or over.

== Education ==
The current Central High School of Clay County and Central Junior High School are in Lineville.

== Media ==
- Radio stations

WCKF 100.7 FM (Classic Country)
WFAZ 90.9 FM (Classic Country)

== Notable people ==
- Howard Ballard, former NFL player
- Hugo Black, Associate Justice of the Supreme Court of the United States from 1937 until 1971.
- Raymond Eugene Brown, serial killer
- Hiram Wesley Evans, Imperial Wizard of the Ku Klux Klan from 1922 to 1939.
- Bob Riley, Alabama's 52nd governor
- Jack L. Treadwell, United States Army colonel and Medal of Honor recipient
