= 2000 United States presidential election in Alabama =

- November 7, 2000
- Turnout: 65.85% ▲

| Nominee | George W. Bush | Al Gore |
| Party | Republican | Democratic |
| Home state | Texas | Tennessee |
| Running mate | Dick Cheney | Joe Lieberman |
| Electoral vote | 9 | 0 |
| Popular vote | 944,409 | 695,602 |
| Percentage | 56.47% | 41.59% |

Bush
50–60%
60–70%
70–80%
Gore
40–50%
50–60%
60–70%
70–80%
80–90%
President before election
Bill Clinton
Democratic
Elected President
George W. Bush
Republican

The 2000 United States presidential election in Alabama took place on November 7, 2000, and was part of the 2000 United States presidential election. Voters chose 9 representatives, or electors to the Electoral College, who voted for president and vice president.

Alabama was won by Republican governor George W. Bush with a 14.88% margin of victory. He won the majority of counties and congressional districts in the state.

As of the 2024 presidential election, this is the last time that a Democrat has won over 40% of the vote in Alabama, or carried any of Choctaw, Colbert, Lawrence, and Jackson counties. This is also the last time that the Republican nominee has won less than 60% of the vote in the state. Bush became the first Republican to win the White House without carrying Montgomery County since Dwight D. Eisenhower in 1952.

== General election ==
=== Polling ===
| Poll source | Date(s) | Sample size | Margin of error | George W. Bush (R) | Al Gore (D) | Ralph Nader (G) | Other / undecided (Note: Calculated by taking the difference of 100% and all other listed candidates combined. For polls that do not report a figure for Nader, this includes his support.) |
|---|---|---|---|---|---|---|---|
| Mason-Dixon Polling & Strategy | November 3, 2000 | 625 | — | 55% | 38% | — | 7% |
| University of South Alabama Polling Group | November 1, 2000 | 442 | — | 48% | 28% | 1% | 23% |
| Capital Survey Research Center | October 19, 2000 | 580 | — | 55% | 37% | — | 8% |
| University of South Alabama Polling Group | October 18, 2000 | 407 | — | 53% | 33% | — | 14% |

=== Results ===
2000 United States presidential election in Alabama
| Party | Candidate | Votes | Percentage | Electoral votes |
|---|---|---|---|---|
| Republican | George W. Bush | 944,409 | 56.47% | 9 |
| Democratic | Al Gore | 695,602 | 41.59% | 0 |
| Independent | Ralph Nader | 18,349 | 1.10% | 0 |
| Independent | Patrick Buchanan | 6,364 | 0.38% | 0 |
| Independent | Harry Browne | 5,902 | 0.35% | 0 |
| Independent | Howard Phillips | 777 | 0.05% | 0 |
| Independent | Write Ins | 701 | 0.04% | 0 |
| Independent | John Hagelin | 447 | 0.03% | 0 |
| Totals | | 1,672,551 | 100.00% | 9 |
| Voter turnout (Voting Age population) | | | | 50% |

=== By county ===
| County | George W. Bush Republican | | Al Gore Democratic | | Various candidates Other parties | | Margin | | Total |
| County | # | % | # | % | # | % | # | % | Total |
|---|---|---|---|---|---|---|---|---|---|
| Autauga | 11,993 | 69.69% | 4,942 | 28.72% | 273 | 1.59% | 7,051 | 40.97% | 17,208 |
| Baldwin | 40,872 | 72.37% | 13,997 | 24.78% | 1,611 | 2.85% | 26,875 | 47.59% | 56,480 |
| Barbour | 5,096 | 49.02% | 5,188 | 49.91% | 111 | 1.07% | -92 | -0.89% | 10,395 |
| Bibb | 4,273 | 60.17% | 2,710 | 38.16% | 118 | 1.66% | 1,563 | 22.01% | 7,101 |
| Blount | 12,667 | 70.48% | 4,977 | 35.67% | 329 | 1.83% | 7,690 | 42.79% | 17,973 |
| Bullock | 1,433 | 29.22% | 3,395 | 69.23% | 76 | 1.55% | -1,962 | -40.01% | 4,904 |
| Butler | 4,127 | 52.89% | 3,606 | 46.21% | 70 | 0.90% | 521 | 6.68% | 7,803 |
| Calhoun | 22,306 | 57.33% | 15,781 | 40.56% | 822 | 2.11% | 6,525 | 16.77% | 38,909 |
| Chambers | 6,037 | 51.01% | 5,616 | 47.46% | 181 | 1.53% | 421 | 3.55% | 11,834 |
| Cherokee | 4,154 | 53.10% | 3,497 | 44.70% | 172 | 2.20% | 657 | 8.40% | 7,823 |
| Chilton | 10,066 | 66.70% | 4,806 | 31.84% | 220 | 1.46% | 5,260 | 34.86% | 15,092 |
| Choctaw | 3,600 | 48.82% | 3,707 | 50.27% | 67 | 0.91% | -107 | -1.45% | 7,374 |
| Clarke | 5,988 | 55.69% | 4,679 | 43.52% | 85 | 0.79% | 1,309 | 12.17% | 10,752 |
| Clay | 3,719 | 63.22% | 2,045 | 34.76% | 119 | 2.02% | 1,674 | 28.46% | 5,883 |
| Cleburne | 3,333 | 65.46% | 1,664 | 32.68% | 95 | 1.87% | 1,669 | 32.78% | 5,092 |
| Coffee | 9,938 | 64.39% | 5,220 | 33.82% | 276 | 1.79% | 4,718 | 30.57% | 15,434 |
| Colbert | 10,518 | 48.85% | 10,543 | 48.96% | 471 | 2.19% | -25 | -0.11% | 21,532 |
| Conecuh | 2,699 | 48.62% | 2,783 | 50.14% | 69 | 1.24% | -84 | -1.52% | 5,551 |
| Coosa | 2,382 | 52.16% | 2,104 | 46.07% | 81 | 1.77% | 278 | 6.09% | 4,567 |
| Covington | 8,961 | 65.83% | 4,440 | 32.62% | 212 | 1.56% | 4,521 | 33.21% | 13,613 |
| Crenshaw | 2,793 | 58.25% | 1,934 | 40.33% | 68 | 1.42% | 859 | 17.92% | 4,795 |
| Cullman | 19,157 | 64.88% | 9,758 | 33.05% | 610 | 2.07% | 9,399 | 31.83% | 29,525 |
| Dale | 10,593 | 67.02% | 4,906 | 31.04% | 307 | 1.94% | 5,687 | 35.98% | 15,806 |
| Dallas | 7,360 | 39.86% | 10,967 | 59.40% | 137 | 0.74% | -3,607 | -19.54% | 18,464 |
| DeKalb | 12,827 | 63.23% | 7,056 | 34.78% | 402 | 1.98% | 5,771 | 28.45% | 20,285 |
| Elmore | 16,777 | 70.48% | 6,652 | 27.94% | 375 | 1.58% | 10,125 | 42.54% | 23,804 |
| Escambia | 6,975 | 59.82% | 4,523 | 38.79% | 162 | 1.39% | 2,452 | 21.03% | 11,660 |
| Etowah | 21,087 | 53.59% | 17,433 | 44.30% | 828 | 2.10% | 3,654 | 9.29% | 39,348 |
| Fayette | 4,582 | 58.68% | 3,064 | 39.24% | 162 | 2.07% | 1,518 | 19.44% | 7,808 |
| Franklin | 6,119 | 55.11% | 4,793 | 43.17% | 191 | 1.72% | 1,326 | 11.94% | 11,103 |
| Geneva | 6,588 | 68.92% | 2,769 | 28.97% | 202 | 2.11% | 3,819 | 39.95% | 9,559 |
| Greene | 850 | 19.34% | 3,504 | 79.71% | 42 | 0.96% | -2,654 | -60.37% | 4,396 |
| Hale | 2,984 | 38.60% | 4,652 | 60.17% | 95 | 1.23% | -1,668 | -21.57% | 7,731 |
| Henry | 4,054 | 58.48% | 2,782 | 40.13% | 96 | 1.38% | 1,272 | 18.35% | 6,932 |
| Houston | 22,150 | 69.10% | 9,412 | 29.36% | 495 | 1.54% | 12,738 | 39.74% | 32,057 |
| Jackson | 8,475 | 47.33% | 9,066 | 50.63% | 365 | 2.04% | -591 | -3.30% | 17,906 |
| Jefferson | 138,491 | 50.59% | 129,889 | 47.45% | 5,383 | 1.97% | 8,602 | 3.14% | 273,763 |
| Lamar | 4,470 | 61.66% | 2,653 | 36.60% | 126 | 1.74% | 1,817 | 25.06% | 7,249 |
| Lauderdale | 17,478 | 54.39% | 13,875 | 43.17% | 784 | 2.44% | 3,603 | 11.22% | 32,137 |
| Lawrence | 5,671 | 46.54% | 6,296 | 51.67% | 218 | 1.79% | -625 | -5.13% | 12,185 |
| Lee | 22,433 | 58.63% | 14,574 | 38.09% | 1,257 | 3.29% | 7,859 | 20.54% | 38,264 |
| Limestone | 14,204 | 60.10% | 8,992 | 38.05% | 438 | 1.85% | 5,212 | 22.05% | 23,634 |
| Lowndes | 1,638 | 26.24% | 4,557 | 72.99% | 48 | 0.77% | -2,919 | -46.75% | 6,243 |
| Macon | 1,091 | 12.35% | 7,665 | 86.80% | 75 | 0.85% | -6,574 | -74.45% | 8,831 |
| Madison | 62,151 | 54.85% | 48,199 | 42.53% | 2,968 | 2.62% | 13,952 | 12.32% | 113,318 |
| Marengo | 4,690 | 48.81% | 4,841 | 50.39% | 77 | 0.80% | -151 | -1.58% | 9,608 |
| Marion | 6,910 | 58.78% | 4,600 | 39.13% | 246 | 2.09% | 2,310 | 19.65% | 11,756 |
| Marshall | 17,084 | 61.04% | 10,381 | 37.09% | 524 | 1.87% | 6,703 | 23.95% | 27,989 |
| Mobile | 78,162 | 55.93% | 58,640 | 41.96% | 2,943 | 2.11% | 19,522 | 13.97% | 139,745 |
| Monroe | 5,153 | 57.57% | 3,741 | 41.79% | 57 | 0.64% | 1,412 | 15.78% | 8,951 |
| Montgomery | 38,827 | 48.34% | 40,371 | 50.26% | 1,130 | 1.41% | -1,544 | -1.92% | 80,328 |
| Morgan | 25,774 | 60.39% | 16,060 | 37.63% | 847 | 1.98% | 9,714 | 22.76% | 42,681 |
| Perry | 1,732 | 29.93% | 4,020 | 69.47% | 35 | 0.60% | -2,288 | -39.54% | 5,787 |
| Pickens | 4,306 | 50.42% | 4,143 | 48.51% | 91 | 1.07% | 163 | 1.91% | 8,540 |
| Pike | 6,058 | 57.45% | 4,357 | 41.32% | 129 | 1.22% | 1,701 | 16.13% | 10,544 |
| Randolph | 4,666 | 58.92% | 3,094 | 39.07% | 159 | 2.01% | 1,572 | 19.85% | 7,919 |
| Russell | 6,198 | 41.95% | 8,396 | 56.83% | 181 | 1.23% | -2,198 | -14.88% | 14,775 |
| Shelby | 47,651 | 76.70% | 13,183 | 21.22% | 1,294 | 2.08% | 34,468 | 55.48% | 62,128 |
| St. Clair | 17,117 | 71.05% | 6,485 | 26.92% | 488 | 2.03% | 10,632 | 44.13% | 24,090 |
| Sumter | 1,629 | 26.76% | 4,415 | 72.52% | 44 | 0.72% | -2,786 | -45.76% | 6,088 |
| Talladega | 13,807 | 54.25% | 11,264 | 44.26% | 380 | 1.49% | 2,543 | 9.99% | 25,451 |
| Tallapoosa | 9,805 | 60.33% | 6,183 | 38.04% | 265 | 1.63% | 3,622 | 22.29% | 16,253 |
| Tuscaloosa | 34,003 | 56.56% | 24,614 | 40.95% | 1,497 | 2.49% | 9,389 | 15.61% | 60,114 |
| Walker | 13,486 | 52.60% | 11,621 | 45.32% | 534 | 2.08% | 1,865 | 7.28% | 25,641 |
| Washington | 4,117 | 54.20% | 3,386 | 44.58% | 93 | 1.22% | 731 | 9.62% | 7,596 |
| Wilcox | 1,661 | 32.40% | 3,444 | 67.19% | 21 | 0.41% | -1,783 | -34.79% | 5,126 |
| Winston | 6,413 | 68.82% | 2,692 | 28.89% | 213 | 2.29% | 3,721 | 39.93% | 9,318 |
| Totals | 944,409 | 56.47% | 695,602 | 41.59% | 32,540 | 1.95% | 248,807 | 14.88% | 1,672,551 |

==== Counties that flipped from Democratic to Republican ====
- Butler (Largest city: Greenville)
- Chambers (Largest city: Valley)
- Cherokee (Largest city: Centre)
- Clarke (Largest city: Jackson)
- Coosa (Largest city: Goodwater)
- Crenshaw (Largest city: Luverne)
- Etowah (Largest city: Gadsden)
- Fayette (Largest city: Fayette)
- Franklin (Largest city: Russellville)
- Marion (Largest city: Hamilton)
- Pickens (Largest city: Aliceville)
- Walker (Largest city: Jasper)
- Washington (Largest city: Chatom)

=== By congressional district ===
Bush won six of seven congressional districts, including one held by a Democrat.

| District | Bush | Gore | Representative |
|---|---|---|---|
| 1st | 60% | 38% | Sonny Callahan |
| 2nd | 63% | 36% | Terry Everett |
| 3rd | 57% | 41% | Bob Riley |
| 4th | 59% | 39% | Robert Aderholt |
| 5th | 55% | 43% | Bud Cramer |
| 6th | 70% | 28% | Spencer Bachus |
| 7th | 25% | 74% | Earl Hilliard |

== Electors ==
Technically the voters of Alabama cast their ballots for electors: representatives to the Electoral College. Alabama is allocated 9 electors because it has 7 congressional districts and 2 senators. All candidates who appear on the ballot or qualify to receive write-in votes must submit a list of 9 electors, who pledge to vote for their candidate and their running mate. Whoever wins the majority of votes in the state is awarded all 9 electoral votes. Their chosen electors then vote for president and vice president. Although electors are pledged to their candidate and running mate, they are not obligated to vote for them. An elector who votes for someone other than their candidate is known as a faithless elector.

The electors of each state and the District of Columbia met on December 18, 2000, to cast their votes for president and vice president. The Electoral College itself never meets as one body. Instead the electors from each state and the District of Columbia met in their respective capitols.

The following were the members of the Electoral College from the state. All were pledged to and voted for George W. Bush and Dick Cheney:

1. Glen Dunlap
2. Bob Fincher
3. Homer Jackson
4. Jerry Lathan
5. Elaine Little
6. Melba Peters
7. Martha Stokes
8. Jean Sullivan
9. Edgar Welden

== See also ==
- United States presidential elections in Alabama
