= Panola =

Panola may refer to several places in the United States:

- Panola, Crenshaw County, Alabama, an unincorporated community
- Panola, Sumter County, Alabama, a census-designated place
- Panola County, Mississippi
- Panola County, Texas
- Panola, Illinois, a village
- Panola, Michigan, an unincorporated community
- Panola, Oklahoma, a census-designated place
- Panola, Texas, an unincorporated community
