= Honoraville, Alabama =

Unincorporated community in Alabama, United States

- Unincorporated community
- Location within Alabama Location within the United States
- Coordinates: 31°51′03″N 86°24′22″W
- Country: United States
- State: Alabama
- County: Crenshaw
- Elevation: 512 ft (156 m)
- Time zone: UTC-6 (Central (CST))
  - Summer (DST): UTC-5 (CDT)
- ZIP code: 36042
- Area code: 334
- GNIS feature ID: 155105

Honoraville /həˈnoʊ.rəˌvɪl/ is an unincorporated community in Crenshaw County, Alabama, United States, located 12.5 miles (20.1 km) northwest of Luverne. Honoraville has a post office with ZIP code 36042.
