= Pursuit Channel =

- Country: United States
- Broadcast area: United States
- Headquarters: Glenwood, Alabama

Programming
- Picture format: 1080i (HDTV)

Ownership
- Owner: Pursuit Media LLC (The Bordelon Group)

History
- Launched: April 23, 2008; 18 years ago

Links
- Website: pursuitchannel.com

Pursuit Channel is an American television network that airs programming geared to hunting, fishing, shooting and outdoor recreation. It is based in Glenwood, Alabama and was launched on April 23, 2008.

Pursuit is available to over 45 million cable and satellite homes and customers, along with web and digital media player availability. The network's schedule mainly is made up of brokered programming purchased in blocks by producers of outdoor programming, or by companies advertising their products as part of the sponsorship of those programs.

In January 2013, Anthem Sports & Entertainment purchased what was described as a "significant ownership stake" in Pursuit Media. Beginning January 11, 2019, Anthem's professional wrestling property, Impact Wrestling began airing its weekly television series on Pursuit. After Anthem acquired a controlling interest in AXS TV on September 9, 2019, Impact! was later announced to be moving to AXS on Tuesday nights beginning in October of that year.

The majority ownership of the network was acquired by The Bordelon Group, headed by Rock Bordelon, whose shows have appeared on the channel.
