= Frank Sikes Airport =

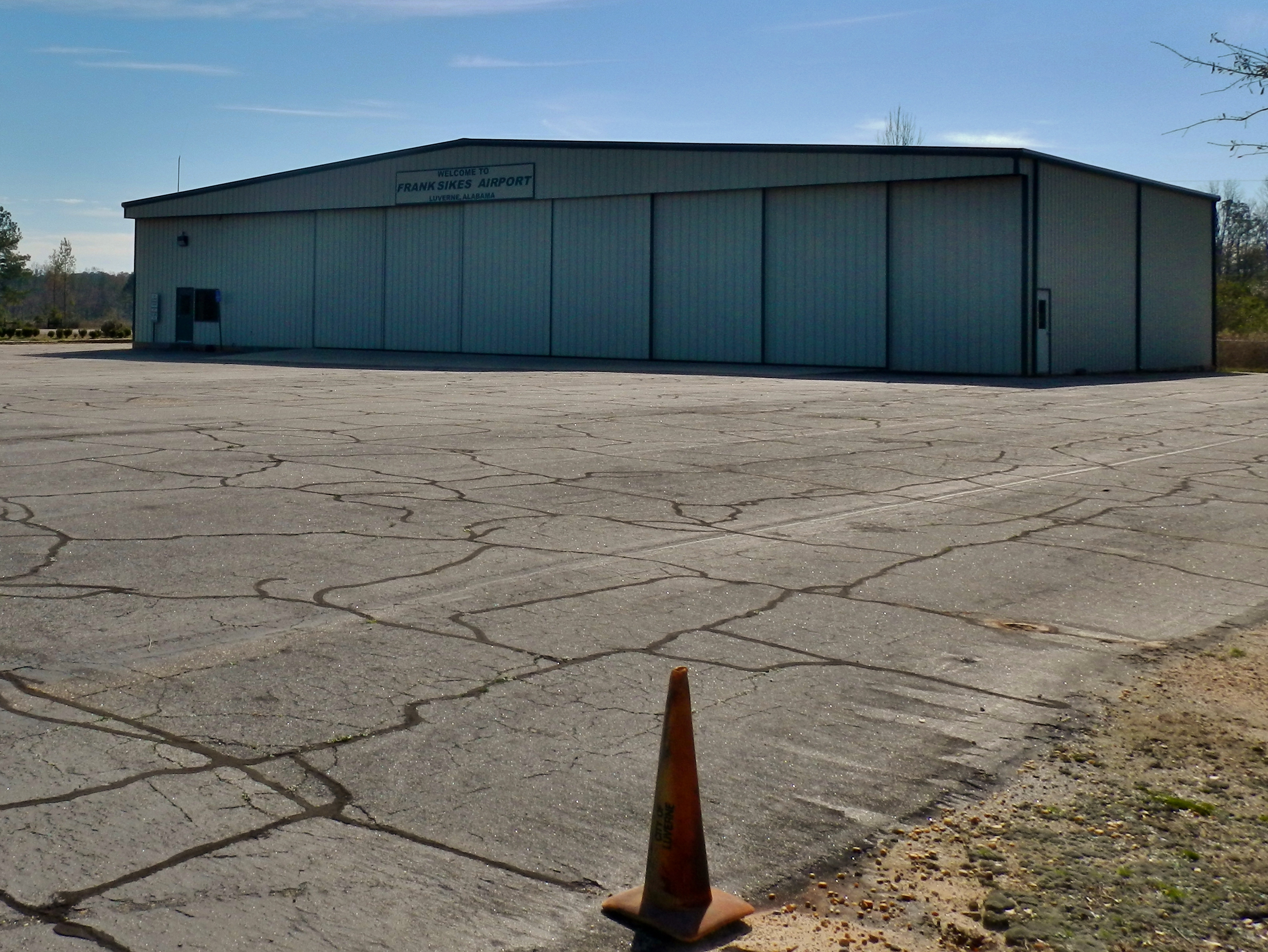
- IATA: none; ICAO: none; FAA LID: 04A

Summary
- Airport type: Public
- Owner: City of Luverne
- Serves: Luverne, Alabama
- Elevation AMSL: 300 ft (91 m)
- Coordinates: 31°44′10″N 086°15′44″W
- Interactive map of Frank Sikes Airport

Runways
Direction	Length		Surface
Direction	ft	m	Surface
4/22	4,640	1,414	Asphalt

Statistics (2008)
- Aircraft operations: 5,636
- Source: Federal Aviation Administration

Frank Sikes Airport (FAA LID: 04A) is a city-owned public-use airport located two nautical miles (3.7 km) north of the central business district of Luverne, a city in Crenshaw County, Alabama, United States.

== Facilities and aircraft ==
Frank Sikes Airport covers an area of 35 acres (14 ha) at an elevation of 300 feet (91 m) above mean sea level. It has one runway designated 4/22 with an asphalt surface measuring 4,640 by 80 feet (1,414 x 24 m). For the 12-month period ending December 9, 2008, the airport had 5,636 aircraft operations, an average of 15 per day.

== See also ==
- List of airports in Alabama
