= Kirkpatrick House =

Historic house in Alabama, United States

- U.S. National Register of Historic Places
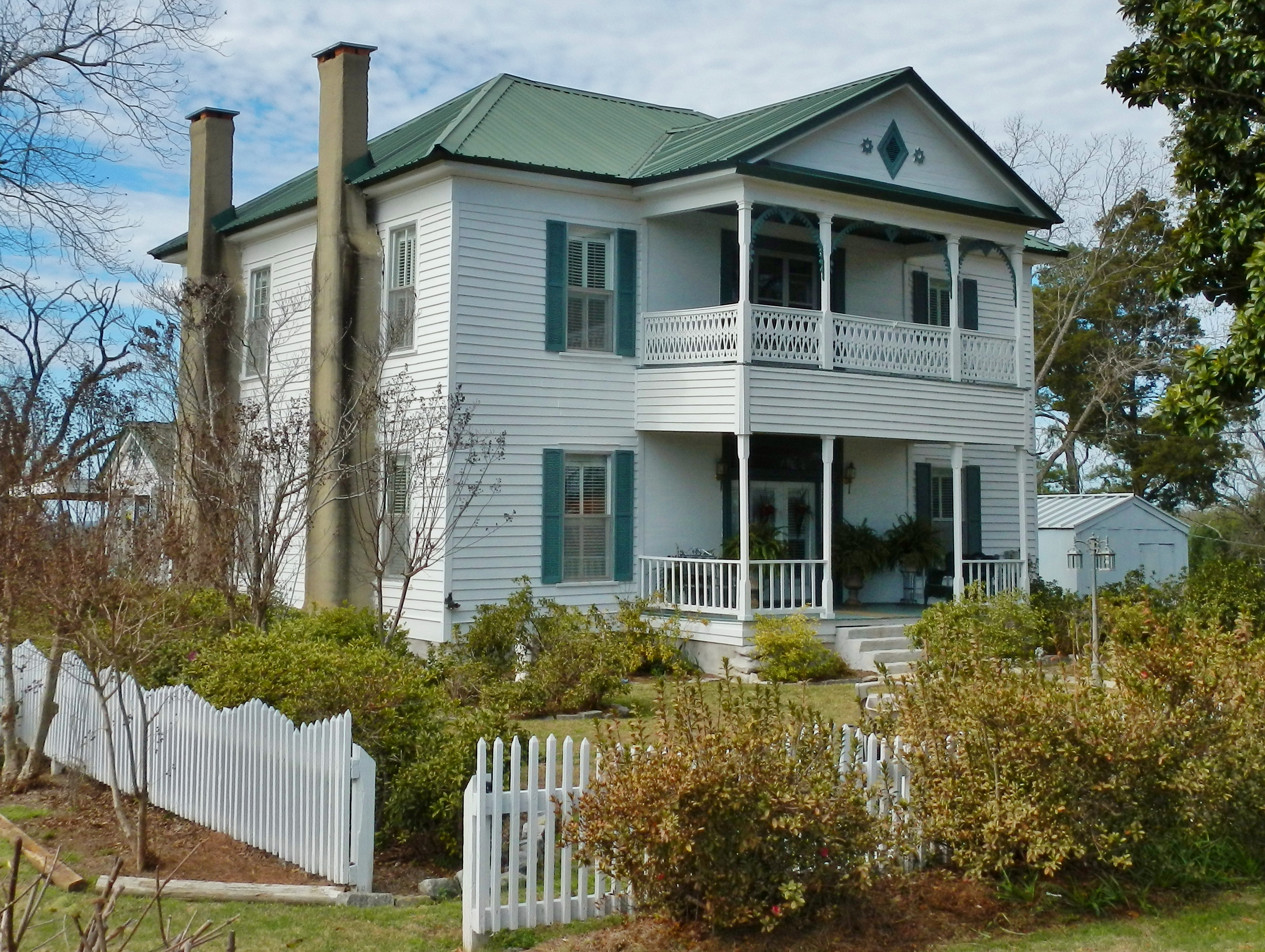

- Location within Alabama Location within the United States
- Nearest city: Highland Home, Alabama
- Coordinates: 31°57′10″N 86°18′52″W
- Area: less than one acre
- NRHP reference No.: 75000309
- Added to NRHP: February 25, 1975

The Kirkpatrick House, also known as the Bradley House, is a historic house located on U.S. Route 331 west of Highland Home, Alabama, United States. The house is one of only two buildings remaining from the Highland Home College, one of over 100 institutes of higher learning founded in Alabama in the 1880s. Colonel M. L. Kirkpatrick, a founder of the school, built the house sometime before 1870. When the Highland Home Institute was founded in the early 1880s, the house became a dormitory for the new school. The school changed its name to the Highland Home Male and Female College in 1889 and operated until 1916; during this time, it was the only institute of higher learning in Crenshaw County. The Kirkpatrick House is the only surviving building from the school's first years as well as the oldest building in Highland Home.

The Kirkpatrick House was added to the National Register of Historic Places on February 25, 1975.
