= Panola, Alabama =

Panola, Alabama may refer to:

- Panola, Crenshaw County, Alabama, an unincorporated community in Crenshaw County
- Panola, Sumter County, Alabama, a census-designated place in Sumter County
