= Highland Home, Alabama =

Unincorporated community in Alabama, United States

- Unincorporated community
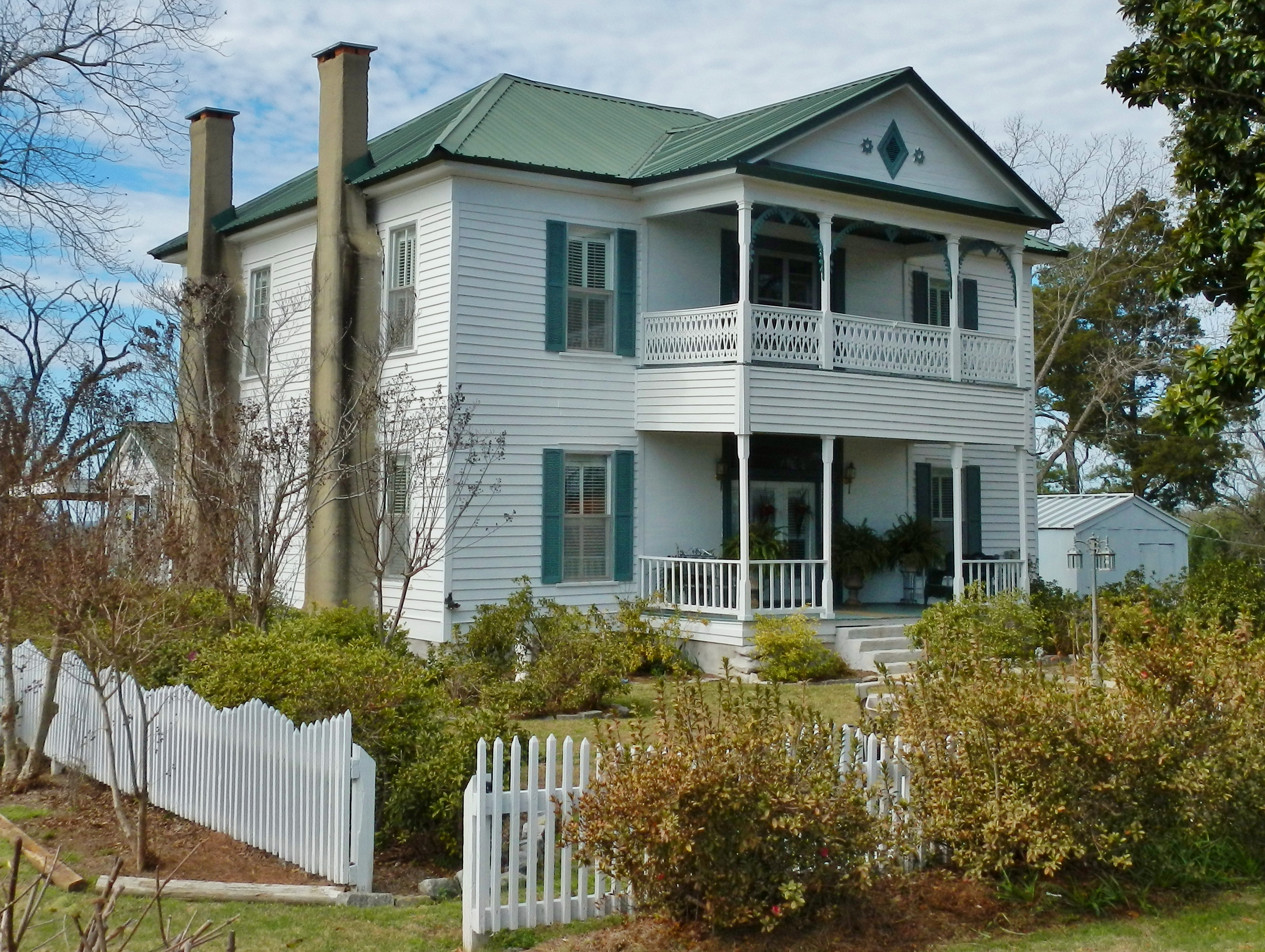
- Located in Highland Home, the Kirkpatrick House was built c. 1869 and added to the National Register of Historic Places on February 25, 1975.

- Location within Alabama Location within the United States
- Coordinates: 31°57′13″N 86°18′50″W
- Country: United States
- State: Alabama
- County: Crenshaw
- Elevation: 591 ft (180 m)
- Time zone: UTC-6 (Central (CST))
  - Summer (DST): UTC-5 (CDT)
- ZIP code: 36041
- Area code: 334
- GNIS feature ID: 155099

Highland Home is an unincorporated community in Crenshaw County, Alabama, United States. Highland Home is located on U.S. Route 331, 16.6 miles (26.7 km) north of Luverne. Highland Home has a post office with ZIP code 36041, which opened on July 15, 1837. Located mostly on highway 331 that also runs to Luverne, Alabama.
