= Weedville =

Weedville may refer to:

- Weedville, Alabama, an alternate name for Weed Crossroad, a populated place in Crenshaw County, Alabama, United States
- Weedville, Arizona, a populated place in Maricopa County, Arizona, United States
- Weedville, Pennsylvania, a CDP in Elk County, Pennsylvania, United States
