= Fullers Crossroads, Alabama =

Unincorporated community in Alabama, United States

- Unincorporated community
- Location within Alabama Location within the United States
- Coordinates: 31°49′05″N 86°18′40″W
- Country: United States
- State: Alabama
- County: Crenshaw
- Elevation: 482 ft (147 m)
- Time zone: UTC-6 (Central (CST))
  - Summer (DST): UTC-5 (CDT)
- Area code: 334
- GNIS feature ID: 118750

Fullers Crossroads is an unincorporated community in Crenshaw County, Alabama, United States.

== History ==
Fullers Crossroads was most likely named for a local family. Fullers Crossroads was one of two choices for the first county seat of Crenshaw County, with Rutledge being chosen based on popular vote. The community maintains a volunteer fire department.
