= Alabama State Route 141 =

State highway in Alabama, United States

State Route 141

Route information
- Maintained by ALDOT
- Length: 14.430 mi (23.223 km)

Major junctions
- South end: SR 189 near Elba
- North end: US 331 / SR 9 near Brantley

Location
- Country: United States
- State: Alabama
- Counties: Coffee, Crenshaw

Highway system
- Alabama State Highway System; Interstate; US; State
← SR 140	→ SR 142

State Route 141 (SR 141) is a 14.430-mile (23.223 km) state highway in the southeastern part of the U.S. state of Alabama. The highway travels from SR 189 southeast of Elba north to U.S. Route 331 (US 331) and SR 9 south of Brantley.

== Route description ==
SR 141 begins at an intersection with SR 189 in rural Coffee County, southeast of Elba. From here, the highway heads north-northwest through farmland until it intersects US 84 (internally designated as SR 12); the two highways share a brief concurrency. SR 141 continues north past this intersection and meets SR 166 at its western terminus in Danleys Crossroads. Past this intersection, SR 141 heads north through a rural area before turning northwest and entering Crenshaw County. The highway runs northwest from here to its terminus, an intersection with US 331 (internally designated as SR 9) south of Brantley.

== Major intersections ==
County	Location	mi	km	Destinations	Notes
Coffee		0.000	0.000	SR 189 – Kinston, Elba	Southern terminus
Coffee		3.764	6.058	US 84 east (SR 12) – Elba	South end of US 84/SR 12 concurrency
Coffee		3.810	6.132	US 84 west (SR 12) – Opp	North end of US 84/SR 12 concurrency
Coffee	Danleys Crossroads	5.429	8.737	SR 166 east / CR 376 west – Elba	Western terminus of SR 166; eastern terminus of CR 376
Crenshaw		14.430	23.223	US 331 (SR 9 / Opp Highway) – Opp, Brantley, Luverne	Northern terminus
1.000 mi = 1.609 km; 1.000 km = 0.621 mi: Concurrency terminus
