= Weedville, Alabama =

Unincorporated community in Alabama, USA

Weed Crossroad, Alabama
- Unincorporated community
- Location within Alabama Location within the United States
- Coordinates: 31°31′08″N 86°13′23″W
- Country: United States
- State: Alabama
- County: Crenshaw
- Elevation: 453 ft (138 m)
- Time zone: UTC-6 (Central (CST))
  - Summer (DST): UTC-5 (CDT)
- Area code: 334
- GNIS feature ID: 157226

Weed Crossroad, also known as Weed or Weedville, is an unincorporated community in Crenshaw County, Alabama, United States. It is located on Alabama State Route 141, 5.1 miles (8.2 km) south-southeast of Brantley.
