= Alabama State Route 166 =

State highway in Alabama, United States

State Route 166

Route information
- Maintained by ALDOT
- Length: 4.726 mi (7.606 km)
- Existed: 1972–present

Major junctions
- West end: SR 141 at Danleys Crossroads
- East end: US 84 at Elba

Location
- Country: United States
- State: Alabama
- Counties: Coffee

Highway system
- Alabama State Highway System; Interstate; US; State
← SR 165	→ SR 167

State Route 166 (SR 166) is a short route in Coffee County in the southeastern part of Alabama. The western terminus of the route is at its junction with SR 141 at Danleys Crossroads, an unincorporated community in the western part of the county. The eastern terminus of the route is at its junction with U.S. Route 84 (US 84) at Elba.

== Route description ==
State Route 166 is a five-mile-long (8 km) route. The route traverses along a two-lane road in western Coffee County, passing through no towns or unincorporated communities until it reaches Elba.

== History ==
When State Route 166 was created in 1972, its western terminus was approximately two miles south of the current terminus. The original route began at an intersection approximately 10 miles (16 km) northwest of Opp. At this intersection, eastbound traffic on US 84 was routed onto northbound SR 141, and through traffic on the roadway that had been carrying US 84 traffic continued on SR 166 until it junctioned with US 84 again west of Elba. In 1989, SR 166 and US 84 exchanged routings between SR 141 and Elba as part of improvements, including widening to four lanes, of US 84 across south Alabama.

== Major intersections ==
The entire route is in Coffee County.

Location	mi	km	Destinations	Notes
Danleys Crossroads	0.000	0.000	SR 141 / CR 376 west	Western terminus; road continues west as CR 376
Elba	4.726	7.606	US 84 (SR 12) – Opp, Downtown, Enterprise	Eastern terminus
1.000 mi = 1.609 km; 1.000 km = 0.621 mi
