= Hoyt Corkins =

American poker player (born 1959)

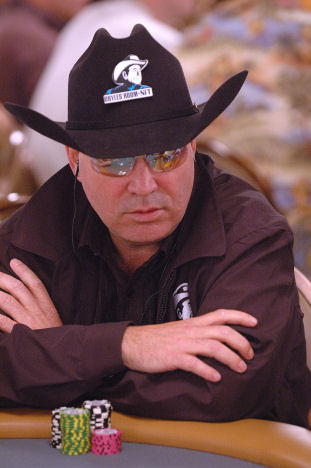
- Corkins at the 2006 World Series of Poker
- Nicknames: Cowboy, Nightmare, Mr. Move All-In, The Westworld Cowboy
- Born: Hoyt Bricken Corkins; December 20, 1959 (age 66); Glenwood, Alabama, U.S.

World Series of Poker
- Bracelets: 2
- Money finishes: 43
- Highest WSOP Main Event finish: 35th, 1990

World Poker Tour
- Titles: 2
- Final tables: 6
- Money finishes: 19

Hoyt Bricken Corkins (born December 20, 1959) is an American professional poker player.

Known for his softly-spoken voice and his aggressive style, Corkins has two World Series of Poker bracelets and two World Poker Tour titles.

== Early life ==
Corkins was born in Glenwood, Alabama. He started playing at the age of 19 after receiving lessons from his father.Corkins's first tournament cash came in 1989, when he finished fourth in the $2,500 Pot-Limit Omaha event at the WSOP for $27,600. His first tournament victory was in the $200 PLO Rebuy at Amarillo Slim's Super Bowl of Poker. He is often known by his nickname "Cowboy" as he always wears a cowboy hat and boots to the table. However, he has been given other nicknames, including "Mr. Move All-In" by Phil Hellmuth Jr. Many players also call him "Nightmare". He often wears a pair of ear plugs while playing in live poker tournaments in order to prevent other players' chatter from affecting his game.

== World Series of Poker ==
Corkins won a World Series of Poker bracelet and $96,000 for winning the 1992 $5,000 Pot Limit Omaha tournament.

In November 2005, Corkins finished second to Mike Matusow in the World Series of Poker Tournament of Champions freeroll, receiving $325,000.

In the 2007 World Series of Poker, Corkins won the $2,500 6 Handed No Limit Hold Em event, defeating Terrence Chan and winning over $515,000, in addition to the championship bracelet.

At the 2008 World Series of Poker Main Event, Corkins finished in 162nd place out of 6,844 entries, earning him $41,816.

=== World Series of Poker bracelets ===
Year	Tournament	Prize (US$)
1992	$5,000 Pot Limit Omaha	$96,000
2007	$2,500 No-Limit Hold'em (6-handed)	$515,065

== Reappearance into poker ==
After the win in 1992, Corkins disappeared from the game for 11 years whilst going through a divorce. He was encouraged to return to poker by his ex-fiancée Natalie, and resurfaced in 2003, taking a then record-breaking first prize ($1,089,200) in the World Poker Tour 2003 World Poker Finals. He had a second-place finish to Gus Hansen in early 2004 at the PokerStars Caribbean Poker Adventure, which earned him $290,065. Corkins was sick from flu during the event, but he says it did not affect his play. Also in 2004, he made the final table at the United States Poker Championship main event held at the Taj Mahal in Atlantic City, NJ.

Away from the poker circuit, Corkins has sixty head of cattle to tend in Alabama and also has a home in Las Vegas.

== World Poker Tour ==
In 2006, he made another World Poker Tour (WPT) final table in the Season V Legends of Poker event, finishing 3rd.

In 2008, in the Season VI of the WPT's World Poker Open WPT Corkins finished second winning $458,267.

In December 2008, during Season VII of the WPT, Corkins made the final table of the Doyle Brunson Five Diamond World Poker Classic and finished in 6th place, earning $216,175.

In January 2010, Hoyt made another World Poker Tour final table at the Southern Poker Championship, and took home the first place prize of $713,986.

As of 2026, Corkins's live tournament earnings total approximately $6,092,620, with his most recent recorded cash dating to June 2023. His 55 cashes at the World Series of Poker account for $1,675,430 of those winnings.
