= Anderson Crenshaw =

American judge (1783–1847)

Anderson Crenshaw (May 22, 1783 – August 31, 1847) was an American judge.

Crenshaw was born on May 22, 1783, in South Carolina. He was the first graduate of the University of South Carolina, and entered the legal profession and became a lawyer in his native state. He moved to Alabama in 1819, and settled at Cahaba, then the capital, and then moved to Butler County in 1821. From 1821 to 1838, he was circuit judge, and the circuit judges constituted the Supreme Court of the state until 1832. He was chancellor of the southern division of Alabama from 1838 until his death. While on the Supreme Court he became somewhat noted for rendering dissenting opinions, which afterward became law. He died in Butler county on August 31, 1847. Crenshaw County, Alabama was named for him.

The following extract is from Garrett's Public Men of Alabama: "He was a whig in politics, but so moderate in his views and feelings, and so devoted to the duties of the high places he occupied, that the question of party politics was never brought to bear upon him, in consequence of which he was retained in office under elections of the legislature, when large democratic majorities existed. His virtues as a man, and his abilities and integrity as a judge, gained the public confidence from the beginning of his long administration of justice, which he retained to the last. Nothing more need be added to such a pregnant record of success."
