= Irene Triplett =

Last recipient of an American Civil War pension (1930–2020)

- Born: January 9, 1930; Wilkes County, North Carolina, U.S.
- Died: May 31, 2020 (aged 90); Wilkesboro, North Carolina, U.S.
- Known for: Last recipient of an American Civil War pension

Irene Triplett (January 9, 1930 – May 31, 2020) was an American woman who was the last recipient of an American Civil War pension. Her father fought for both the Confederacy and later the Union in the war.

== Biography ==
Triplett was born in 1930 to Mose Triplett, age 83, and Elida Hall, age 34. She was one of five children, of whom only she and her brother survived childhood. Her father, who had fought for both the Confederacy and the Union during the Civil War, was aged 78 when he married her mother; their union was Mose Triplett's second marriage.

Irene Triplett grew up on her father's farm in Wilkes County, North Carolina. According to Triplett, she suffered a difficult childhood and was regularly beaten by both her parents and schoolteachers. Classmates teased her about her father whom they denounced as a "traitor".

Triplett was mentally disabled. Her education ended at the sixth grade and, in 1943, she moved with her mother and brother to a poorhouse, where she remained until 1960. She later lived in private nursing homes until her death.

According to acquaintances, she was a regular user of chewing tobacco and was a fan of gospel music.

Triplett died on May 31, 2020, following complications from surgery.

== Pension ==
Triplett's father died in 1938 at the age of 92, after which she collected his Civil War pension of $73.13 per month from the Department of Veterans Affairs; her cognitive impairments qualified her to inherit the pension as a helpless child of a veteran. The total amount of benefits she received was about $73,000, or $344,000 when adjusted for inflation.

Widespread public awareness of Triplett's status occurred in 2013 as the result of a Daily Mail story about her.

After the 2018 death of Fred Upham, the son of William H. Upham, she became the last surviving eligible child of a Civil War veteran.

== See also ==
- Helen Viola Jackson, the last living wife of a Civil War veteran, who died on December 16, 2020.
