= Theba, Alabama =

Unincorporated community in Alabama, United States

- Unincorporated community
- Location within Alabama Location within the United States
- Coordinates: 31°33′21″N 86°18′13″W
- Country: United States
- State: Alabama
- County: Crenshaw
- Elevation: 289 ft (88 m)
- Time zone: UTC-6 (Central (CST))
  - Summer (DST): UTC-5 (CDT)
- Area code: 334
- GNIS feature ID: 155271

Theba is an unincorporated community in Crenshaw County, Alabama, United States. Theba is located on U.S. Route 29, 3.3 miles (5.3 km) southwest of Brantley.
