= Moodys Crossroads, Alabama =

Unincorporated community in Alabama, US

- Unincorporated community
- Location within Alabama Location within the United States
- Coordinates: 31°44′06″N 86°23′41″W
- Country: United States
- State: Alabama
- County: Crenshaw
- Elevation: 358 ft (109 m)
- Time zone: UTC-6 (Central (CST))
  - Summer (DST): UTC-5 (CDT)
- Area code: 334
- GNIS feature ID: 122976

Moodys Crossroads is an unincorporated community in Crenshaw County, Alabama, United States.

In 1924, Moodys Croassroads was a formal location for voter registration. By 1926, it had a cemetery, and a general store there was mentioned in 1932. In 2004, it was still referred to as an inhabited settlement.
