= American Civil War widows who survived into the 21st century =

At least four widows of veterans of the American Civil War (fought 1861–1865) are known to have survived into the 21st century. All were born in the 20th century and married their husbands while the women were still young and the men were in advanced age. This practice was not uncommon at the time due to the possibility of receiving pensions as dependents of Civil War veterans; the pensions were known for their generosity. Some of these unions were in name only, while others lived together as married couples.

== List of Civil War widows who survived into the 21st century ==
Widow					Marriage	Husband					State
Name	Birth	Death		Age at marriage	Marriage	Name	Birth	Death	Age at marriage	Allegiance	State
Name	Birth	Year	Years after Civil War	Age at marriage	Marriage	Name	Birth	Death	Age at marriage	Allegiance	State
Gertrude Janeway	1909	2003	138 years	18	1927	John Janeway	1845	1937	81	Union	Tennessee
Alberta Martin	1906	2004	139 years	21	1927	William Jasper Martin	1845	1931	81	Confederacy	Alabama
Maudie Hopkins	1914	2008	143 years	19	1934	William M. Cantrell	1847	1937	86	Confederacy	Arkansas
Helen Viola Jackson	1919	2020	155 years	17	1936	James Bolin	1843	1939	93	Union	Missouri

== Helen Viola Jackson (1919–2020) ==
Helen Viola Jackson
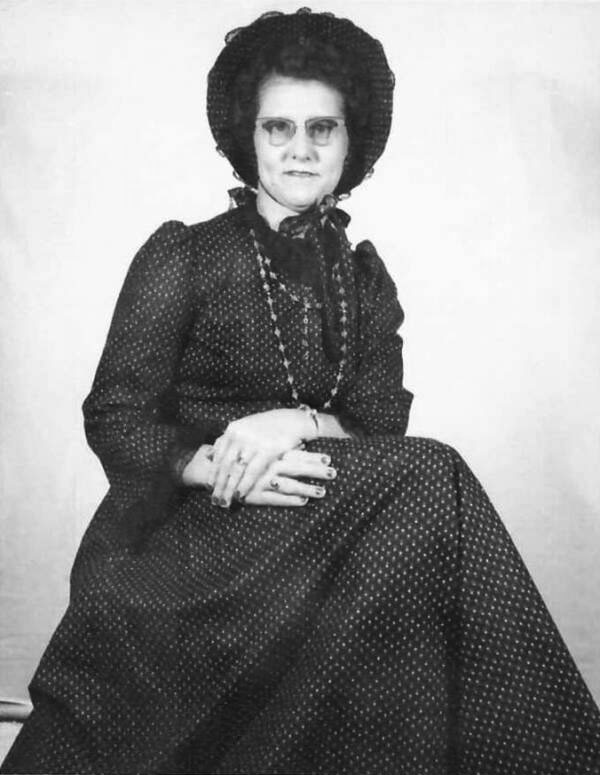
- Helen Viola Jackson in 1955, in costume for the Webster County Centennial
- Born: August 3, 1919; Webster County, Missouri
- Died: December 16, 2020 (aged 101); Marshfield, Missouri
- Spouse: James Bolin (m. 1936; died 1939)

James Bolin
- Born: March 23, 1843; Tennessee
- Died: June 18, 1939 (aged 96); Niangua, Missouri
- Spouses: Elizabeth Davenport Bolin (m. 1868; died 1922) Helen Viola Jackson (m. 1936)

Elizabeth Davenport Bolin
- Born: December 27, 1842; Alexander, Illinois
- Died: March 24, 1922 (aged 79); Niangua, Missouri
- Spouses: Thomas Jefferson Ferrell (1828–1861) (m. 1858; died 1861) James Bolin (m. 1868)

Helen Viola Jackson (August 3, 1919 – December 16, 2020) was the last surviving widow of a Union soldier and the last surviving widow of a Civil War veteran overall; she died on December 16, 2020, at the age of 101. In 1936, in the midst of the Great Depression, she married 93-year-old James Bolin (1843–1939), who had served in the 14th Missouri Cavalry. Jackson was 17. She met him when her father volunteered her to help the elderly Bolin with basic chores. With no other means to repay her kindness, Bolin offered to marry Jackson so she would become eligible to receive his pension after he died. Similar marriages had occurred before.

Jackson and Bolin were married outside his home in Niangua, Missouri. Following the marriage, the couple never made their marriage public, fearing damage to Jackson's reputation. She continued to live with her parents. Following Bolin's death, three years later, Jackson decided against applying for the $73.13 monthly pension (equivalent to $1,690 in 2025) after Bolin's daughters threatened to ruin her reputation. The marriage was recorded in Bolin's family Bible and other documents verified by Daughters of Union Veterans of the Civil War, 1861–1865. Jackson did not reveal the marriage until 2017 when planning for her own funeral with her pastor and they realized the historical significance of her combined longevity and secret marriage. Prior to this revelation Maudie Hopkins, who died in 2008, was believed to have been the last surviving wife of a Civil War soldier.

Jackson never married after Bolin's death and had no children. She was a prominent member of her community in Elkland, Missouri. In 2018, two years before her death, she was honored by inclusion in the Missouri Walk of Fame.

== Maudie Hopkins (1914–2008) ==
Maudie Hopkins
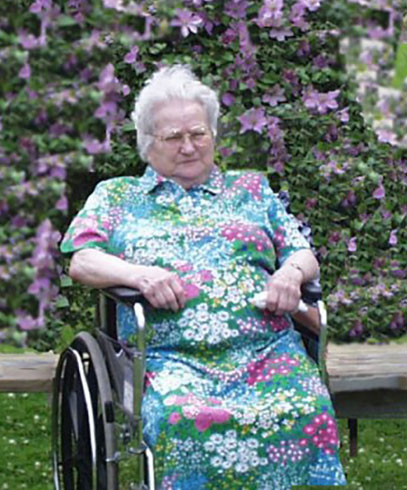
- Maudie Hopkins in 2004
- Born: Maudie Cecelia Acklin; December 7, 1914; Baxter County, Arkansas
- Died: August 17, 2008 (aged 93); Lexa, Arkansas
- Spouses: William M. Cantrell (m. 1934; died 1937) Winfred Albert White (died 1969) Milton Hopkins (died 1997)
- Children: 3

Maudie White Hopkins (née Maudie Cecelia Acklin; December 7, 1914 – August 17, 2008) is believed to have been one of the oldest surviving widows of a Confederate soldier. At the time of her death, she was the oldest publicly known Civil War widow, although others were believed to be alive but unidentified.

Born as Maudie Cecelia Acklin in Baxter County, Arkansas, she married William M. Cantrell (1847–1937) on February 2, 1934, when she was 19 and he was 87. Cantrell had enlisted in the Confederate States Army at age 16 in Pikeville, Kentucky, and served in General Samuel G. French's Battalion of Virginia Infantry. He was captured in 1863, and was part of a prisoner exchange. He had a previous wife, who had died in 1929. Cantrell supported her with a pension of US$25 every two or three months, and she inherited his home in 1937. She received no further pension benefits after his death. She remarried later in 1937, and once thereafter, and had three children.

It was not especially uncommon for young women in Arkansas to marry Confederate pensioners; in 1937 the state passed a law stating that women who married Civil War veterans would not be eligible for a widow's pension. The law was later changed in 1939 to state that widows born after 1870 were not eligible for pensions. Hopkins generally kept her first marriage a secret, fearing that the resulting gossip (of her marrying a much older man) would damage her reputation.

After researching records from Arkansas and United States Census Bureau data, Hopkins was certified by various historical organizations, most notably the United Daughters of the Confederacy. A spokeswoman for the UDC, Martha Boltz, has said that there may be two other widows, one in Tennessee and another in North Carolina, but if they are still alive, they choose to remain anonymous.

Hopkins died on August 17, 2008, in a nursing home in Lexa, Arkansas, aged 93.

== Alberta Martin (1906–2004) ==
Alberta Martin
- Born: Alberta Stewart; December 4, 1906; Danleys Crossroads, Alabama
- Died: May 31, 2004 (aged 97); Enterprise, Alabama
- Spouses: Howard Farrow (m. 1925; died 1926) William Jasper Martin (m. 1927; died 1931) Charlie Martin (m. 1931; died 1983)
- Children: 1 (from Farrow); 1 (from W. J. Martin)

Alberta Martin (née Stewart; December 4, 1906 – May 31, 2004) was once believed to be the last living widow of a Confederate soldier; she is thought to be the last widow whose marriage to a Civil War soldier produced offspring.

She was born Alberta Stewart to sharecropper parents in Danleys Crossroads, Alabama, a small sawmill town south of Montgomery, and was commonly referred to as "Miz Alberta". Her mother died of cancer when she was 11. Martin dropped out of school after 7th grade to work in cotton and peanut fields, as well as in a cotton mill. At 18, she married a cabdriver named Howard Farrow and they had a son. Howard Farrow died in a car accident in 1926.

After moving to Opp, Alabama, she met widower William Jasper Martin, born in 1845 and a veteran of the 4th Alabama Infantry, a Confederate unit during the Civil War. On December 10, 1927, the then-21-year-old Stewart married the 81-year-old Martin, primarily to get help raising her son and because his $50 per month Confederate pension check guaranteed her a degree of financial security. She gave birth to a second son, Willie Martin, 10 months after her wedding to William Jasper Martin, who was 82 at the time of the child's birth. William Jasper Martin died in 1931.

Two months after her second husband's death, Alberta Martin married Charlie Martin, William Jasper Martin's grandson from a much earlier marriage. Alberta and Charlie Martin were married for more than fifty years until his death in 1983, after which she moved to Elba, Alabama.

Alberta Martin lived in obscurity for most of her life, but gained media attention starting in the 1990s. In the final years of her life she became a symbol for the Sons of Confederate Veterans, appearing at some of their rallies. The state of Alabama had long since stopped issuing pension checks to the widows of Confederate veterans, believing them all to be dead, but with assistance from Sons of Confederate Veterans and other supporters Alberta began receiving a Confederate widow's pension in 1996 and was awarded back payment as well.

In 1996, two Sons of Confederate Veterans members, Russell Darden and Ken Chancey, paid her a visit, saw that she lived without air-conditioning and resolved to secure a Confederate widow's pension for her.

She appeared to relish the attention the media brought her and attended many Civil War themed re-enactments and other events as an honored guest. She lived her final years in a nursing home paid for by various supporters. Following her death from a heart attack at the age of 97 on May 31, 2004, the thrice-widowed Martin was given an "1860s style ceremony" with full honors as the widow of a Confederate veteran. She was survived by her son William who died in 2005. She was featured in one chapter of the book Confederates in the Attic.

== Gertrude Janeway (1909–2003) ==
Gertrude Janeway
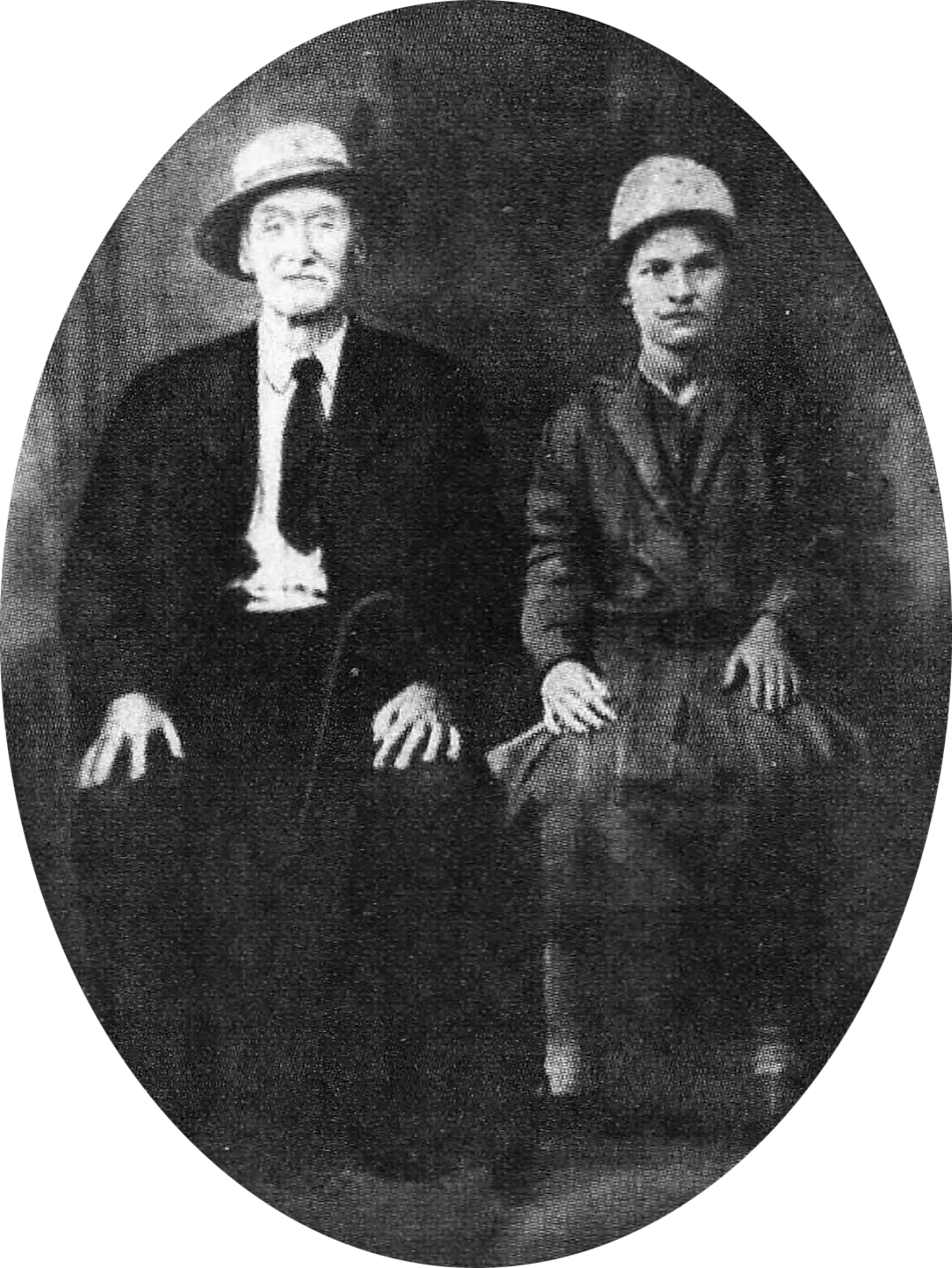
- John and Gertrude Janeway
- Born: Gertrude Grubb; July 3, 1909; Blaine, Tennessee
- Died: January 17, 2003 (aged 93); Blaine, Tennessee
- Resting place: New Corinth Cemetery, Blaine, Tennessee
- Spouses: John Janeway (m. 1927; died 1937) Alfred Vineyard (m. 1940; div. 1943)

Gertrude Janeway (née Grubb; July 3, 1909 – January 17, 2003) was born in Blaine, Tennessee, to Thomas Bradshaw Grubb (1853–1922) and Halley J. Townsley Grubb (1877–1939). She was courted by John Janeway (1845–1937) beginning when she was 16. Her mother, widowed when Gertrude was 13, would not allow her to marry until she was 18. She married John Janeway, an officer in the 14th Illinois Cavalry, in 1927 when she was 18 and he 81. The marriage ceremony took place in the middle of a dirt road with family and friends in attendance. They lived together in a log cabin in Blaine, Tennessee, until John Janeway's death in 1937.

On January 31, 1940, "Gertie" Janeway married Alfred Vineyard in Grainger County, Tennessee. In 1943, Gertrude divorced Alfred Vineyard (1902–1966) and went back to using the name Gertrude Janeway.

She was a member of the Green Acres Missionary Baptist Church. Gertrude continued to live in the cabin for nearly 70 years after her husband's death. She received a $70 pension check for veterans' benefits from the government every two months until her death in 2003.

On April 9, 2011, The Economist commented on her as an example of the length of pension obligations:

When Gertrude Janeway died in 2003, she was still getting a monthly check for $70 from the Veterans Administration—for a military pension earned by her late husband, John, on the Union side of the American Civil War that ended in 1865. The pair had married in 1927, when he was 81 and she was 18. The amount may have been modest but the entitlement spanned three centuries, illustrating just how long pension commitments can last.

== See also ==
- Last surviving American Civil War veterans
- Esther Sumner Damon, American Revolutionary War widow who survived into the 20th century
- Irene Triplett, last known surviving child of a Civil War veteran
- Age disparity in sexual relationships
- Oldest Living Confederate Widow Tells All
