= Danleys Crossroads, Alabama =

Unincorporated community in Alabama, United States

- Unincorporated community
- Location within Alabama Location within the United States
- Coordinates: 31°25′09″N 86°10′04″W
- Country: United States
- State: Alabama
- County: Coffee
- Elevation: 430 ft (130 m)
- Time zone: UTC-6 (Central (CST))
  - Summer (DST): UTC-5 (CDT)
- Area code: 334
- GNIS feature ID: 149949

Danleys Crossroads is an unincorporated community in Coffee County, Alabama, United States. Danleys Crossroads is located at the junction of Alabama State Routes 141 and 166, 5.9 miles (9.5 km) west of Elba.

== Notable person ==
- Alberta Martin, Civil War widow
