= Lynching of Jesse Thornton =

African American who was lynched in the U.S.

- Location: 31°42′52″N 86°15′48″W; Luverne, Alabama, U.S.
- Date: June 22, 1940
- Motive: Punishing a Prison break from detention for Jim Crow infraction

Jesse Thornton was a 26 years old African-American man who was lynched in the town of Luverne, Alabama, on June 22, 1940. Thornton was lynched after escaping prison during his detention for an altercation between him and J. Doris Rhodes. He was shot to death, and his body was thrown into the Patsaliga River. The Equal Justice Initiative documented that the white man whom Thornton had offended by his Jim Crow infraction was a police officer.

According to Legacy of Lynching, the killing took place on June 21. Police officer Rhodes hears Thornton mention his name, apparently leaving out "Mr." He arrested him but while he was taking him to jail, a mob started throwing stones at Thornton, who was held by another officer, Nolan Ellis. Thornton managed to escape but was shot by the mob, which pursued him and then shot him dead. The mob then went to his house where they abused Nellie May, Thornton's wife. Later, they came back to the house, abducted May, and threatened to kill her if she would tell on them. The NAACP's local chapter investigated, and with the assistance of Thurgood Marshall sent a report to the United States Department of Justice. No prosecution resulted from the investigation or the report.
