= Panola, Michigan =

Pentoga, Michigan
- Unincorporated community
- Location within the state of Michigan
- Coordinates: 46°02′58″N 88°19′43″W
- Country: United States
- State: Michigan
- County: Iron
- Township: Mastodon Township
- Elevation: 1,352 ft (412 m)
- Time zone: UTC-6 (Central (CST))
  - Summer (DST): UTC-5 (CDT)
- ZIP code: 49920
- Area code: 906
- GNIS feature ID: 1617768

Panola is an unincorporated community in Iron County, in the U.S. state of Michigan.

== History ==
Panola is derived from a Native American word meaning "cotton".
