= Rutledge, Alabama =

- Town
- Location of Rutledge in Crenshaw County, Alabama.
- Coordinates: 31°43′59″N 86°18′35″W
- Country: United States
- State: Alabama
- County: Crenshaw

Government

Area
  - Total: 5.86 sq mi (15.18 km^{2})
  - Land: 5.86 sq mi (15.18 km^{2})
  - Water: 0 sq mi (0.00 km^{2})
- Elevation: 344 ft (105 m)

Population (2020)
  - Total: 351
  - Density: 59.9/sq mi (23.12/km^{2})
- Time zone: UTC-6 (Central (CST))
  - Summer (DST): UTC-5 (CDT)
- ZIP code: 36071
- Area code: 334
- FIPS code: 01-67176
- GNIS feature ID: 0153234

Rutledge is a town in Crenshaw County, Alabama, United States. As of the 2020 census, Rutledge had a population of 351.

== Geography ==
Rutledge is located at the geographic center of Crenshaw County at 31°43′59″N 86°18′35″W (31.733103, -86.309619). The city of Luverne, the Crenshaw County seat, lies along Rutledge's eastern border.

According to the U.S. Census Bureau, the town has a total area of 5.9 square miles (15.2 km^{2}), all land.

== History ==
Rutledge began as Barber's Crossroads. It was originally settled by Jared Phelps Barber. The town was briefly named Crenshaw, but on June 10, 1867, it was changed to Rutledge in honor of Captain Henry Rutledge, Company H. 59th Alabama Infantry, CSA. Rutledge was the first county seat of Crenshaw County and held that position from March 1867 to May 1893. It was incorporated in 1871.

== Demographics ==
Historical population
Census	Pop.	Note	%±
1880	215		—
1890	314		46.0%
1900	346		10.2%
1910	230		−33.5%
1920	155		−32.6%
1930	215		38.7%
1940	289		34.4%
1950	370		28.0%
1960	276		−25.4%
1970	353		27.9%
1980	496		40.5%
1990	473		−4.6%
2000	476		0.6%
2010	467		−1.9%
2020	351		−24.8%
U.S. Decennial Census; 2013 Estimate

As of the census of 2000, there were 476 people, 201 households, and 127 families residing in the town. The population density was 143.4 inhabitants per square mile (55.4/km^{2}). There were 264 housing units at an average density of 79.5 per square mile (30.7/km^{2}). The racial makeup of the town was 71.01% White, 28.36% Black or African American, and 0.63% from two or more races.

There were 201 households, out of which 28.4% had children under the age of 18 living with them, 40.8% were married couples living together, 17.9% had a female householder with no husband present, and 36.8% were non-families. 34.8% of all households were made up of individuals, and 18.9% had someone living alone who was 65 years of age or older. The average household size was 2.37 and the average family size was 3.08.

In the town, the population was spread out, with 25.4% under the age of 18, 9.9% from 18 to 24, 26.3% from 25 to 44, 24.2% from 45 to 64, and 14.3% who were 65 years of age or older. The median age was 37 years. For every 100 females, there were 88.9 males. For every 100 females age 18 and over, there were 80.2 males.

The median income for a household in the town was $17,500, and the median income for a family was $22,500. Males had a median income of $25,179 versus $18,583 for females. The per capita income for the town was $10,226. About 30.9% of families and 30.2% of the population were below the poverty line, including 33.6% of those under age 18 and 26.5% of those age 65 or over.
