= Glenwood, Alabama =

- Town
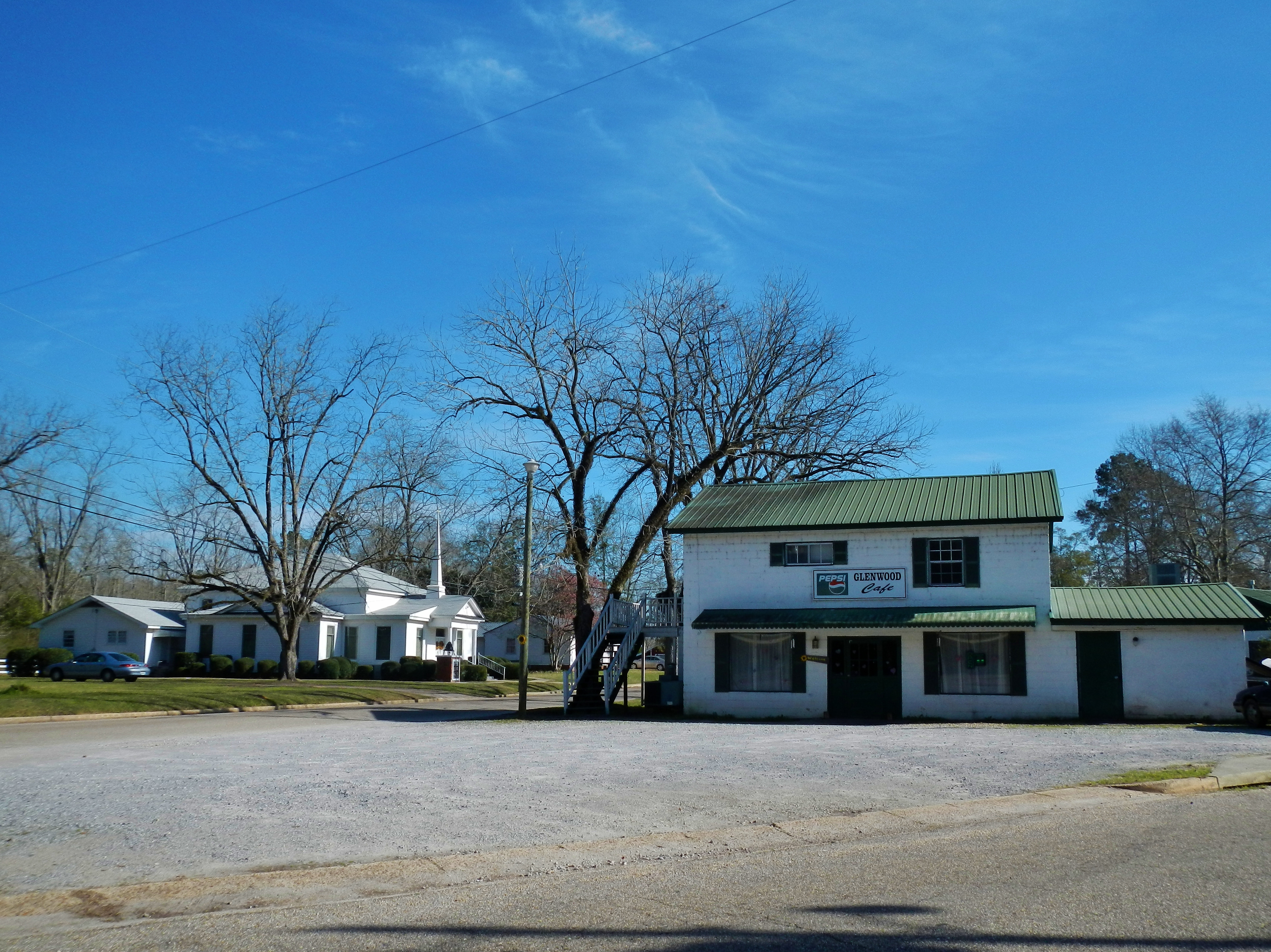
- Glenwood in 2012

- Location of Glenwood in Crenshaw County, Alabama.
- Coordinates: 31°40′3″N 86°10′29″W
- Country: United States
- State: Alabama
- County: Crenshaw

Area
  - Total: 0.73 sq mi (1.90 km^{2})
  - Land: 0.73 sq mi (1.89 km^{2})
  - Water: 0.0039 sq mi (0.01 km^{2})
- Elevation: 279 ft (85 m)

Population (2020)
  - Total: 152
  - Density: 208/sq mi (80.3/km^{2})
- Time zone: UTC-6 (Central (CST))
  - Summer (DST): UTC-5 (CDT)
- ZIP code: 36034
- Area code: 334
- FIPS code: 01-30160
- GNIS feature ID: 0119046

Glenwood is a town in Crenshaw County, Alabama, United States. At the 2020 census, the population was 152. Glenwood was incorporated in 1907.

== Geography ==
Glenwood is located in eastern Crenshaw County at 31°40′4″N 86°10′30″W (31.667771, −86.174962).

According to the U.S. Census Bureau, the town has a total area of 0.73 square miles (1.9 km^{2}), of which 0.004 square miles (0.01 km^{2}), or 0.01%, is water.

== Demographics ==
Historical population
Census	Pop.	Note	%±
1910	336		—
1920	386		14.9%
1930	429		11.1%
1940	393		−8.4%
1950	413		5.1%
1960	416		0.7%
1970	378		−9.1%
1980	341		−9.8%
1990	208		−39.0%
2000	191		−8.2%
2010	187		−2.1%
2020	152		−18.7%
U.S. Decennial Census; 2013 Estimate

As of the census of 2000, there were 191 people, 92 households, and 58 families residing in the town. The population density was 262.8 inhabitants per square mile (101.5/km^{2}). There were 118 housing units at an average density of 162.3 per square mile (62.7/km^{2}). The racial makeup of the town was 69.11% White, 29.84% Black or African American, and 1.05% from two or more races. 0.52% of the population were Hispanic or Latino of any race.

There were 92 households, out of which 25.0% had children under the age of 18 living with them, 47.8% were married couples living together, 12.0% had a female householder with no husband present, and 35.9% were non-families. 32.6% of all households were made up of individuals, and 14.1% had someone living alone who was 65 years of age or older. The average household size was 2.08 and the average family size was 2.59.

In the town, the population was spread out, with 18.3% under the age of 18, 5.2% from 18 to 24, 29.8% from 25 to 44, 27.7% from 45 to 64, and 18.8% who were 65 years of age or older. The median age was 44 years. For every 100 females, there were 85.4 males. For every 100 females age 18 and over, there were 75.3 males.

The median income for a household in the town was $28,750, and the median income for a family was $36,875. Males had a median income of $31,250 versus $21,250 for females. The per capita income for the town was $19,074. About 7.4% of families and 13.4% of the population were below the poverty line, including 21.2% of those under the age of eighteen and 25.0% of those 65 or over.

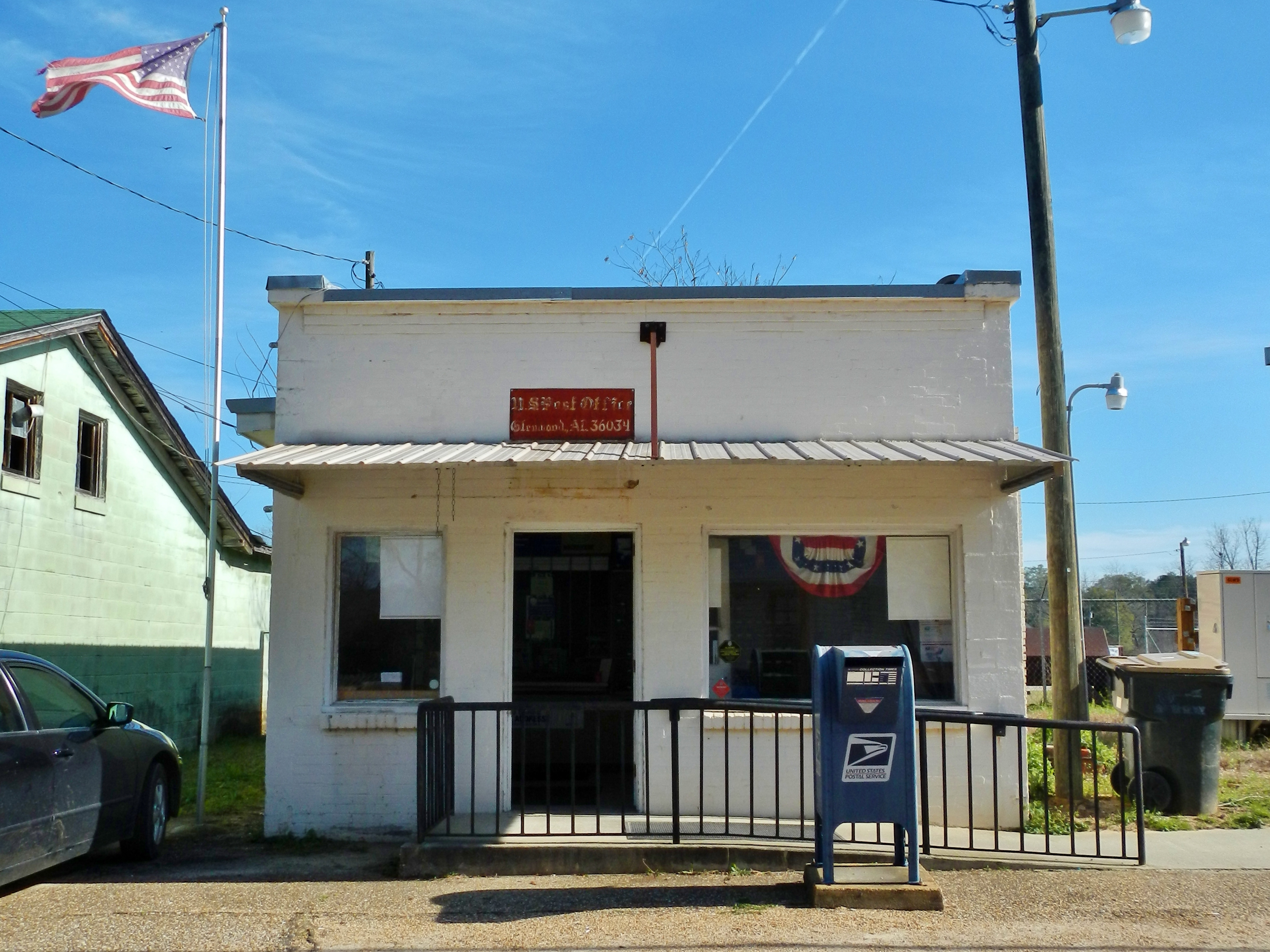
Glenwood Post Office (ZIP code: 36034), January 2012

== Notable person ==
- Hoyt Corkins, professional poker player

== See also ==
- List of towns in Alabama
