= 1952 United States presidential election in Alabama =

- November 4, 1952

All 11 Alabama votes to the Electoral College
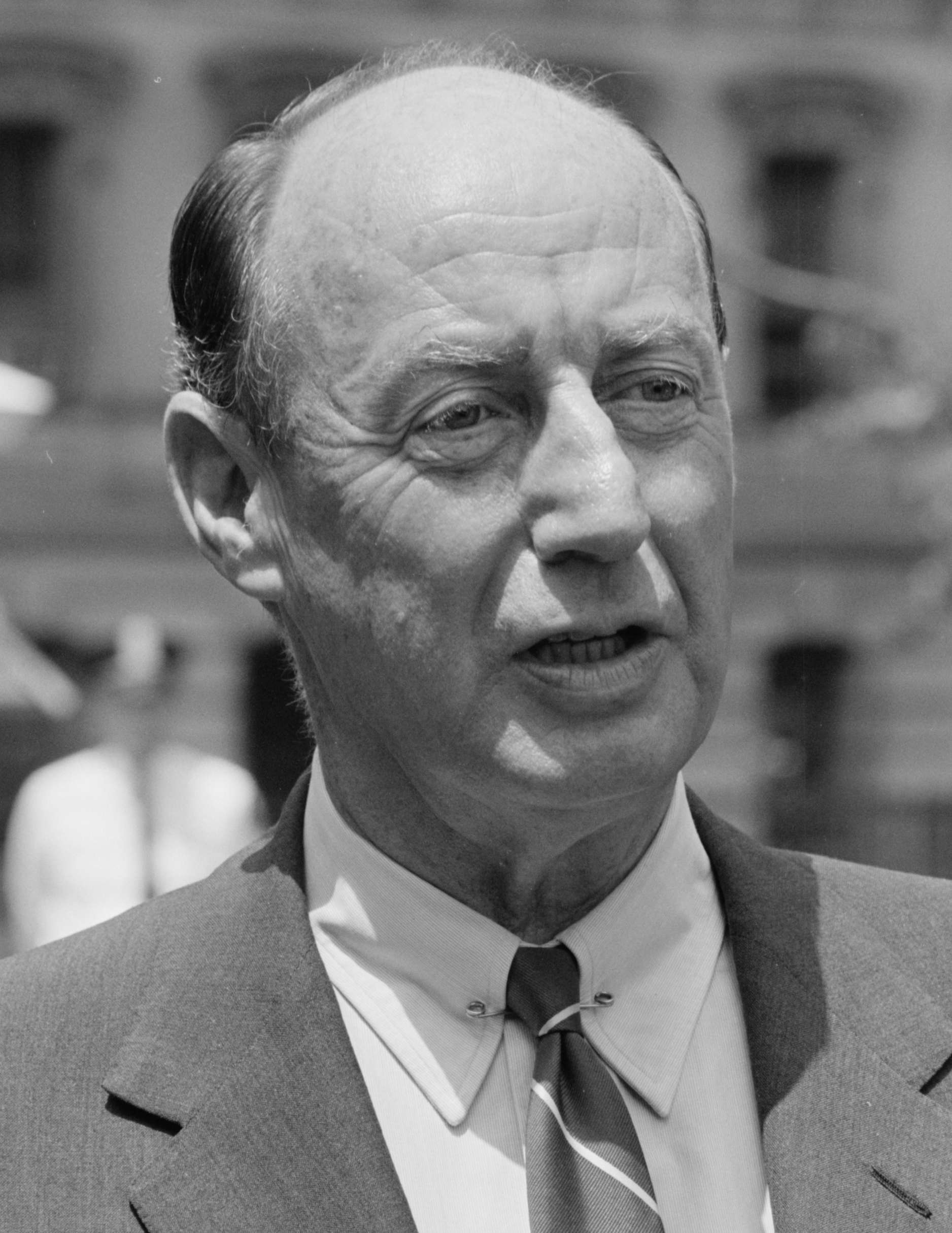

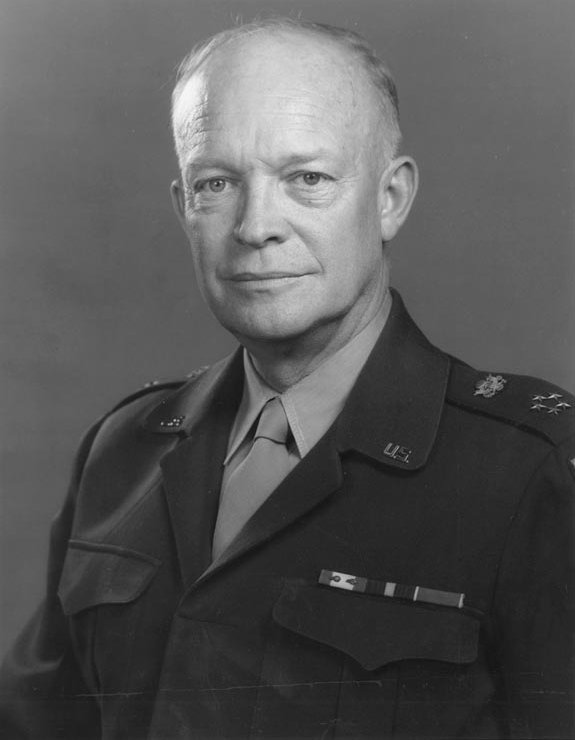
Nominee	Adlai Stevenson	Dwight D. Eisenhower
Party	Democratic	Republican
Home state	Illinois	New York
Running mate	John Sparkman	Richard Nixon
Electoral vote	11	0
Popular vote	275,075	149,231
Percentage	64.55%	35.02%
County results
Stevenson
50–60%
60–70%
70–80%
80–90%
Eisenhower
50–60%
President before election
Harry S. Truman
Democratic
Elected President
Dwight D. Eisenhower
Republican

The 1952 United States presidential election in Alabama took place on November 4, 1952, as part of the 1952 United States presidential election. Alabama voters chose eleven representatives, or electors, to the Electoral College, who voted for president and vice president. In Alabama, voters voted for electors individually instead of as a slate, as in the other states.

Since the 1890s, Alabama had been effectively a one-party state ruled by the Democratic Party. Disenfranchisement of almost all African-Americans and a large proportion of poor whites via poll taxes, literacy tests and informal harassment had essentially eliminated opposition parties outside of Unionist Winston County and presidential campaigns in a few nearby northern hill counties. The only competitive statewide elections during this period were thus Democratic Party primaries — limited to white voters until the landmark court case of Smith v. Allwright, following which Alabama introduced the Boswell Amendment — ruled unconstitutional in Davis v. Schnell in 1949, although substantial increases in black voter registration would not occur until after the late 1960s Voting Rights Act.

Unlike other Deep South states, soon after black disenfranchisement Alabama's remaining white Republicans made rapid efforts to expel blacks from the state Republican Party, and under Oscar D. Street, who ironically was appointed state party boss as part of the pro-Taft “black and tan” faction in 1912, the state GOP would permanently turn “lily-white”, with the last black delegates at any Republican National Convention serving in 1920. However, with two exceptions the Republicans were unable to gain from their hard lily-white policy. The first was when they exceeded forty percent in the 1920 House of Representatives races for the 4th, 7th and 10th congressional districts, and the second was 1928 presidential election when Senator James Thomas Heflin embarked on a nationwide speaking tour, partially funded by the Ku Klux Klan, against Roman Catholic Democratic nominee Al Smith and supported Republican Herbert Hoover, who went on to lose the state that year by only seven thousand votes.

Following Smith, Alabama's loyalty to the national Democratic Party would be broken when Harry S. Truman, seeking a strategy to win the Cold War against the radically egalitarian rhetoric of Communism, launched the first Civil Rights bill since Reconstruction. Southern Democrats became enraged and for the 1948 presidential election, Alabama's Democratic presidential elector primary chose electors who were pledged to not vote for incumbent President Truman, while the state Supreme Court ruled that any statute requiring party presidential electors to vote for that party's national nominee was void, with the result that Truman was entirely excluded from the Alabama ballot despite a “Loyalist” group petitioning incumbent governor "Big Jim" Folsom to allow Truman electors on the ballot alongside the “Democratic” electors pledged to States’ Rights nominee Strom Thurmond.

After Thurmond, running as the “Democratic” nominee, carried Alabama by a margin only slightly smaller than Franklin D. Roosevelt’s four victories, Dixiecrats would lose control of the state party to loyalists in 1950. For 1952, these loyalists would pledge state Democrats to support the national nominees, Illinois Governor Adlai Stevenson and running mate, US Senator John Sparkman, whilst unlike the other three states who voted for Thurmond, few Alabama Democrats would support Republican nominees Columbia University President Dwight D. Eisenhower and California Senator Richard Nixon. Despite this, Eisenhower did briefly visit the state during September, and gained some public support over issues of taxation and the stalemated Korean War.

== Polls ==
Source	Ranking	As of
Lansing State Journal	Safe D (Flip)	September 17, 1952
The Montgomery Advertiser	Safe D (Flip)	October 23, 1952
Lubbock Morning Avalanche	Safe D (Flip)	October 24, 1952
The Salt Lake Tribune	Safe D (Flip)	October 24, 1952
The Greeneville Sun	Certain D (Flip)	October 25, 1952
The Modesto Bee	Safe D (Flip)	October 27, 1952

== Results ==
General election results
Party	Pledged to	Elector	Votes
Democratic Party	Adlai Stevenson II	Miles C. Allgood	275,075
Democratic Party	Adlai Stevenson II	DeWitt Carmichael	274,971
Democratic Party	Adlai Stevenson II	James J. Mayfield	274,930
Democratic Party	Adlai Stevenson II	J. E. Brantley	274,915
Democratic Party	Adlai Stevenson II	Samuel W. Cleveland	274,853
Democratic Party	Adlai Stevenson II	Roy Davis McCord	274,830
Democratic Party	Adlai Stevenson II	Luther Patrick	274,828
Democratic Party	Adlai Stevenson II	W. W. Malone	274,777
Democratic Party	Adlai Stevenson II	W. D. Partlow Jr.	274,536
Democratic Party	Adlai Stevenson II	Frank Embry	274,461
Democratic Party	Adlai Stevenson II	William C. Taylor	274,429
Republican Party	Dwight D. Eisenhower	William E. Brooks Jr.	149,231
Republican Party	Dwight D. Eisenhower	L. A. Carroll	148,994
Republican Party	Dwight D. Eisenhower	John B. Byrd	148,976
Republican Party	Dwight D. Eisenhower	Paul G. Parsons	148,936
Republican Party	Dwight D. Eisenhower	J. F. Moore	148,914
Republican Party	Dwight D. Eisenhower	John A. Posey	148,906
Republican Party	Dwight D. Eisenhower	Offa B. Cosby	148,902
Republican Party	Dwight D. Eisenhower	Leander Isbell	148,890
Republican Party	Dwight D. Eisenhower	Arthur South	148,872
Republican Party	Dwight D. Eisenhower	Roberts S. Cartledge	148,794
Republican Party	Dwight D. Eisenhower	Carl Wiegand	148,783
Prohibition Party	Stuart Hamblen	Leon Browning	1,814
Prohibition Party	Stuart Hamblen	C. B. Davis	1,719
Prohibition Party	Stuart Hamblen	W. C. Eubank	1,716
Prohibition Party	Stuart Hamblen	J. A. Fields	1,713
Prohibition Party	Stuart Hamblen	Thomas G. Jones	1,696
Prohibition Party	Stuart Hamblen	Jack Moore	1,693
Prohibition Party	Stuart Hamblen	J. B. Lockhart	1,689
Prohibition Party	Stuart Hamblen	Cora H. McAdory	1,685
Prohibition Party	Stuart Hamblen	Glenn V. Tingley	1,681
Prohibition Party	Stuart Hamblen	Eulalia Vess	1,678
Prohibition Party	Stuart Hamblen	G. D. Lewis	1,677
Total votes			426,120

=== Results by county ===
County	Adlai Stevenson Democratic		Dwight D. Eisenhower Republican		Stuart Hamblen Prohibition		Margin		Total votes cast
County	#	%	#	%	#	%	#	%	Total votes cast
Autauga	1,505	65.21%	787	34.10%	16	0.69%	718	31.11%	2,308
Baldwin	3,386	51.17%	3,179	48.04%	52	0.79%	207	3.13%	6,617
Barbour	2,250	73.77%	798	26.16%	2	0.07%	1,452	47.61%	3,050
Bibb	1,971	71.18%	784	28.31%	14	0.51%	1,187	42.87%	2,769
Blount	3,161	64.67%	1,720	35.19%	7	0.14%	1,441	29.48%	4,888
Bullock	918	67.50%	442	32.50%	0	0.00%	476	35.00%	1,360
Butler	2,440	69.16%	1,087	30.81%	1	0.03%	1,353	38.35%	3,528
Calhoun	8,023	71.68%	3,064	27.37%	106	0.95%	4,959	44.31%	11,193
Chambers	6,155	85.61%	990	13.77%	45	0.63%	5,165	71.84%	7,190
Cherokee	2,664	82.96%	539	16.79%	8	0.25%	2,125	66.17%	3,211
Chilton	2,269	46.84%	2,563	52.91%	12	0.25%	-294	-6.07%	4,844
Choctaw	1,583	72.45%	593	27.14%	9	0.41%	990	45.31%	2,185
Clarke	3,121	70.53%	1,303	29.45%	1	0.02%	1,818	41.08%	4,425
Clay	1,972	62.33%	1,183	37.39%	9	0.28%	789	24.94%	3,164
Cleburne	1,557	66.14%	792	33.64%	5	0.21%	765	32.50%	2,354
Coffee	3,919	84.83%	699	15.13%	2	0.04%	3,220	69.70%	4,620
Colbert	5,920	81.01%	1,381	18.90%	7	0.10%	4,539	62.11%	7,308
Conecuh	1,678	68.27%	749	30.47%	31	1.26%	929	37.80%	2,458
Coosa	1,501	65.52%	788	34.40%	2	0.09%	713	31.12%	2,291
Covington	4,956	75.57%	1,581	24.11%	21	0.32%	3,375	51.46%	6,558
Crenshaw	2,485	81.96%	544	17.94%	3	0.10%	1,941	64.02%	3,032
Cullman	5,254	60.62%	3,391	39.13%	22	0.25%	1,863	21.49%	8,667
Dale	2,669	70.93%	1,073	28.51%	21	0.56%	1,596	42.42%	3,763
Dallas	2,082	44.95%	2,550	55.05%	0	0.00%	-468	-10.10%	4,632
DeKalb	5,209	56.52%	3,997	43.37%	11	0.12%	1,212	13.15%	9,217
Elmore	4,199	76.10%	1,315	23.83%	4	0.07%	2,884	52.27%	5,518
Escambia	3,385	73.86%	1,187	25.90%	11	0.24%	2,198	47.96%	4,583
Etowah	10,997	70.06%	4,634	29.52%	66	0.42%	6,363	40.54%	15,697
Fayette	2,287	60.52%	1,481	39.19%	11	0.29%	806	21.33%	3,779
Franklin	3,461	58.73%	2,424	41.13%	8	0.14%	1,037	17.60%	5,893
Geneva	2,703	73.93%	950	25.98%	3	0.08%	1,753	47.95%	3,656
Greene	674	61.00%	430	38.91%	1	0.09%	244	22.09%	1,105
Hale	1,210	61.36%	758	38.44%	4	0.20%	452	22.92%	1,972
Henry	1,966	82.19%	421	17.60%	5	0.21%	1,545	64.59%	2,392
Houston	3,779	59.38%	2,517	39.55%	68	1.07%	1,262	19.83%	6,364
Jackson	3,677	74.15%	1,272	25.65%	10	0.20%	2,405	48.50%	4,959
Jefferson	38,111	53.85%	32,254	45.58%	401	0.57%	5,857	8.27%	70,766
Lamar	2,512	80.56%	605	19.40%	1	0.03%	1,907	61.16%	3,118
Lauderdale	7,097	78.62%	1,910	21.16%	20	0.22%	5,187	57.46%	9,027
Lawrence	2,651	76.49%	809	23.34%	6	0.17%	1,842	53.15%	3,466
Lee	2,803	63.22%	1,626	36.67%	5	0.11%	1,177	26.55%	4,434
Limestone	3,844	87.24%	549	12.46%	13	0.30%	3,295	74.78%	4,406
Lowndes	809	56.06%	631	43.73%	3	0.21%	178	12.33%	1,443
Macon	1,457	70.08%	621	29.87%	1	0.05%	836	40.21%	2,079
Madison	8,216	82.82%	1,623	16.36%	81	0.82%	6,593	66.46%	9,920
Marengo	1,790	56.79%	1,362	43.21%	0	0.00%	428	13.58%	3,152
Marion	2,850	65.55%	1,489	34.25%	9	0.21%	1,361	31.30%	4,348
Marshall	6,011	74.22%	2,069	25.55%	19	0.23%	3,942	48.67%	8,099
Mobile	14,473	50.40%	14,153	49.29%	89	0.31%	320	1.11%	28,715
Monroe	2,587	80.07%	637	19.72%	7	0.22%	1,950	60.35%	3,231
Montgomery	9,234	52.68%	8,102	46.22%	193	1.10%	1,132	6.46%	17,529
Morgan	7,029	74.94%	2,335	24.89%	16	0.17%	4,694	50.05%	9,380
Perry	1,352	64.02%	756	35.80%	4	0.19%	596	28.22%	2,112
Pickens	1,519	62.20%	905	37.06%	18	0.74%	614	25.14%	2,442
Pike	2,546	72.45%	965	27.46%	3	0.09%	1,581	44.99%	3,514
Randolph	2,964	73.77%	1,047	26.06%	7	0.17%	1,917	47.71%	4,018
Russell	3,564	80.38%	867	19.55%	3	0.07%	2,697	60.83%	4,434
St. Clair	2,326	59.31%	1,590	40.54%	6	0.15%	736	18.77%	3,922
Shelby	2,473	53.34%	2,156	46.51%	7	0.15%	317	6.83%	4,636
Sumter	894	55.91%	702	43.90%	3	0.19%	192	12.01%	1,599
Talladega	5,028	58.18%	3,588	41.52%	26	0.30%	1,440	16.66%	8,642
Tallapoosa	5,055	80.89%	1,187	19.00%	7	0.11%	3,868	61.89%	6,249
Tuscaloosa	7,677	65.50%	3,872	33.04%	171	1.46%	3,805	32.46%	11,720
Walker	6,862	65.78%	3,490	33.45%	80	0.77%	3,372	32.33%	10,432
Washington	1,977	75.83%	623	23.90%	7	0.27%	1,354	51.93%	2,607
Wilcox	988	57.64%	725	42.30%	1	0.06%	263	15.34%	1,714
Winston	1,390	40.69%	2,017	59.05%	9	0.26%	-627	-18.36%	3,416
Totals	275,075	64.55%	149,231	35.02%	1,814	0.43%	125,844	29.53%	426,120

==== Counties that flipped from Dixiecrat to Democratic ====
- Autauga
- Baldwin
- Barbour
- Bibb
- Blount
- Butler
- Calhoun
- Chambers
- Choctaw
- Clarke
- Clay
- Cleburne
- Coffee
- Conecuh
- Coosa
- Covington
- Crenshaw
- Cullman
- Dale
- DeKalb
- Elmore
- Escambia
- Etowah
- Fayette
- Franklin
- Geneva
- Hale
- Henry
- Houston
- Jefferson
- Lee
- Lawrence
- Madison
- Marengo
- Marion
- Marshall
- Monroe
- Morgan
- Mobile
- Montgomery
- Shelby
- Perry
- Pickens
- Pike
- Randolph
- Russell
- St. Clair
- Talladega
- Tallapoosa
- Tuscaloosa
- Walker
- Washington
- Bullock
- Lowndes
- Wilcox
- Greene
- Sumter
- Macon
- Cherokee
- Colbert
- Jackson
- Lauderdale
- Limestone

==== Counties that flipped from Dixiecrat to Republican ====
- Chilton
- Dallas

=== Results by congressional district ===
Adlai Stevenson won the majority of the vote in all of Alabama's congressional districts in 1952. Candidate who won nationally is placed first in the table listed below.

District	Stevenson	Eisenhower
1st	57.8%	42.2%
2nd	63.2%	36.8%
3rd	72.2%	27.8%
4th	64.1%	35.9%
5th	72.7%	27.3%
6th	61.3%	38.7%
7th	62.6%	37.4%
8th	79.6%	20.4%
9th	54.2%	45.8%

== Analysis ==
Much as polls suggested, Alabama was won by Stevenson with 64.55 percent of the popular vote, against Eisenhower's 35.02 percent. Eisenhower, although not to the same degree as in Louisiana, Mississippi and South Carolina, did gain substantial support from Black Belt whites who could no longer accept the position of the national Democratic Party on civil rights, although this was largely confined to the central part of that region. Eisenhower's victory in Dallas County was the first Republican victory in this county since Rutherford B. Hayes in 1876.

In contrast, the northern hill country remained very loyal to Stevenson, and in some counties with traditionally substantial Republican votes like Winston and DeKalb Eisenhower actually did worse than Thomas E. Dewey in 1948.

1952 would mark the last time Montgomery and Jefferson counties would vote Democratic in a presidential election until 1996 and 2008 respectively, as both would become epicenters of the Civil Rights Movement of the 1950s and 1960s.

== See also ==
- United States presidential elections in Alabama
