= Panola, Crenshaw County, Alabama =

Unincorporated community in Alabama, United States

Panola, Alabama
- Unincorporated community
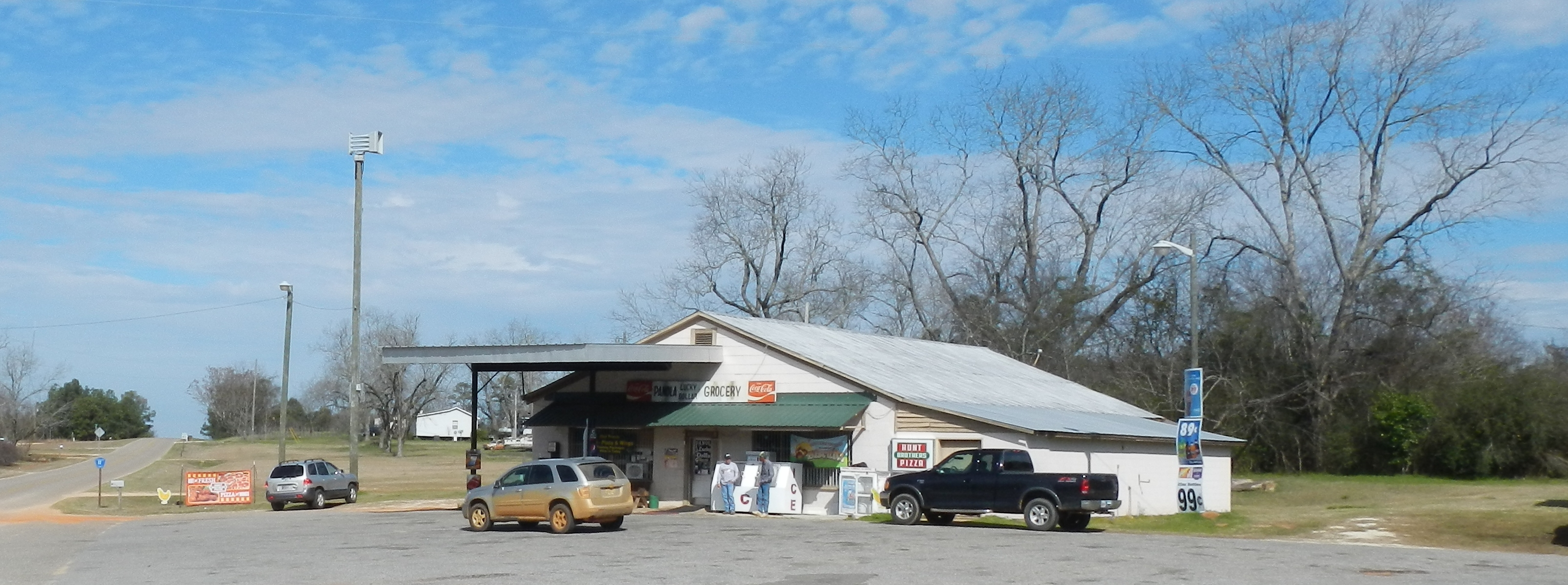
- Panola, Alabama in 2012

- Location within Alabama Location within the United States
- Coordinates: 31°58′18″N 86°23′20″W
- Country: United States
- State: Alabama
- County: Crenshaw
- Elevation: 614 ft (187 m)
- Time zone: UTC-6 (Central (CST))
  - Summer (DST): UTC-5 (CDT)
- Area code: 334
- GNIS feature ID: 124399

Panola is an unincorporated community in Crenshaw County, Alabama, United States, located 11 miles (18 km) east of Fort Deposit.
