= Crenshaw County, Alabama =

County in Alabama, United States

- County
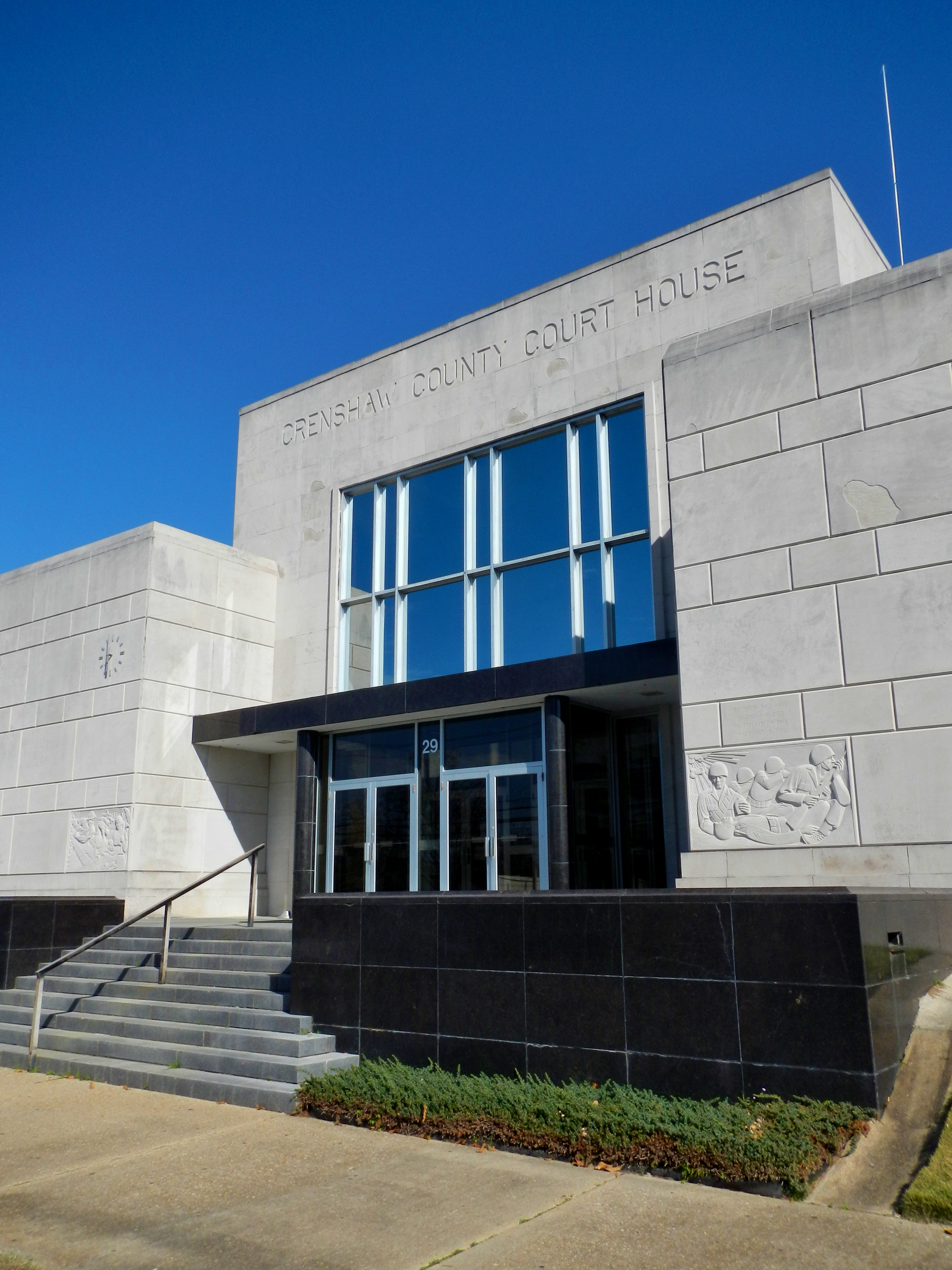
- Crenshaw County Courthouse in Luverne

- Location within the U.S. state of Alabama
- Coordinates: 31°43′41″N 86°18′36″W
- Country: United States
- State: Alabama
- Founded: November 30, 1866
- Named for: Anderson Crenshaw
- Seat: Luverne
- Largest city: Luverne

Area
  - Total: 611 sq mi (1,580 km^{2})
  - Land: 609 sq mi (1,580 km^{2})
  - Water: 2.1 sq mi (5.4 km^{2}) 0.3%

Population (2020)
  - Total: 13,194
  - Estimate (2025): 13,175 ▼
  - Density: 21.7/sq mi (8.36/km^{2})
- Time zone: UTC−6 (Central)
  - Summer (DST): UTC−5 (CDT)
- Congressional district: 2nd
- Website: crenshawcountyalonline.com
- County Number 24 on Alabama Licence Plates

Crenshaw County is a county located in the south central portion of the U.S. state of Alabama. It is located immediately south of the Montgomery metropolitan area. As of the 2020 census, the population was 13,194. Its county seat is Luverne. Its name is in honor of an Alabama judge, Anderson Crenshaw.

== History ==
Crenshaw County was established after the American Civil War on November 30, 1866, by the Reconstruction era legislature. It was formed from parts of Butler, Coffee, Covington, Pike and Lowndes counties. While part of the coastal area, this county had relatively infertile soils, limiting cotton and other agriculture. Its planters used enslaved African Americans for all needed types of labor. Many of their descendants stayed in the area, and nearly one-quarter of the county population is African American.

Crenshaw County became a center of timbering in the Piney Wood region, especially after the Montgomery and Florida Railroad Company constructed a line through the county in 1886. This provided transport to markets for timber. It connected with Sprague Junction in Montgomery County, Alabama. The timber camps were rough work areas where racial tensions sometimes flared.

== Geography ==
According to the United States Census Bureau, the county has a total area of 611 square miles (1,580 km^{2}), of which 609 square miles (1,580 km^{2}) is land and 2.1 square miles (5.4 km^{2}) (0.3%) is water. The county is located in the Gulf Coastal Plain region of the state. Much of the land is also covered by forests that are used for logging.

=== Major highways ===
- U.S. Highway 29 / State Route 15 (unsigned)
- U.S. Highway 331 / State Route 9 (unsigned)
- State Route 10
- State Route 97
- State Route 106
- State Route 141
- State Route 189

=== Adjacent counties ===
- Montgomery County (north)
- Pike County (east)
- Coffee County (southeast)
- Covington County (south)
- Butler County (west)
- Lowndes County (northwest)

== Demographics ==
Historical population
Census	Pop.	Note	%±
1870	11,156		—
1880	11,726		5.1%
1890	15,425		31.5%
1900	19,668		27.5%
1910	23,313		18.5%
1920	23,017		−1.3%
1930	23,656		2.8%
1940	23,631		−0.1%
1950	18,981		−19.7%
1960	14,909		−21.5%
1970	13,188		−11.5%
1980	14,110		7.0%
1990	13,635		−3.4%
2000	13,665		0.2%
2010	13,906		1.8%
2020	13,194		−5.1%
2025 (est.)	13,175	▼	−0.1%
U.S. Decennial Census; 1790–1960 1900–1990; 1990–2000 2010–2020

=== Racial and ethnic composition ===
Crenshaw County, Alabama – Racial and ethnic composition Note: the US Census treats Hispanic/Latino as an ethnic category. This table excludes Latinos from the racial categories and assigns them to a separate category. Hispanics/Latinos may be of any race.
Race / Ethnicity (NH = Non-Hispanic)	Pop 2000	Pop 2010	Pop 2020	% 2000	% 2010	% 2020
White alone (NH)	10,042	10,020	9,333	73.49%	72.06%	70.74%
Black or African American alone (NH)	3,369	3,241	3,085	24.65%	23.31%	23.38%
Native American or Alaska Native alone (NH)	51	56	48	0.37%	0.40%	0.36%
Asian alone (NH)	15	189	83	0.11%	1.36%	0.63%
Pacific Islander alone (NH)	1	1	2	0.01%	0.01%	0.02%
Other race alone (NH)	11	2	27	0.08%	0.01%	0.20%
Mixed race or Multiracial (NH)	89	193	429	0.65%	1.39%	3.25%
Hispanic or Latino (any race)	87	204	187	0.64%	1.47%	1.42%
Total	13,665	13,906	13,194	100.00%	100.00%	100.00%

=== 2020 census ===
As of the 2020 census, the county had a population of 13,194. The median age was 44.3 years. 21.5% of residents were under the age of 18 and 21.1% of residents were 65 years of age or older. For every 100 females there were 92.1 males, and for every 100 females age 18 and over there were 87.8 males age 18 and over.

The racial makeup of the county was 71.2% White, 23.5% Black or African American, 0.5% American Indian and Alaska Native, 0.6% Asian, 0.0% Native Hawaiian and Pacific Islander, 0.6% from some other race, and 3.6% from two or more races. Hispanic or Latino residents of any race comprised 1.4% of the population.

0.0% of residents lived in urban areas, while 100.0% lived in rural areas.

There were 5,680 households in the county, of which 28.9% had children under the age of 18 living with them and 32.3% had a female householder with no spouse or partner present. About 32.2% of all households were made up of individuals and 14.8% had someone living alone who was 65 years of age or older.

There were 6,516 housing units, of which 12.8% were vacant. Among occupied housing units, 71.1% were owner-occupied and 28.9% were renter-occupied. The homeowner vacancy rate was 1.5% and the rental vacancy rate was 11.4%.

=== 2010 census ===
As of the census of 2010, there were 13,906 people, 5,652 households, and 3,882 families living in the county. The population density was 23 people per square mile (8.9 people/km^{2}). There were 6,735 housing units at an average density of 11 units per square mile (4.2 units/km^{2}). The racial makeup of the county was 72.6% White, 23.4% Black or African American, 0.4% Native American, 1.4% Asian, 0.1% Pacific Islander, 0.7% from other races, and 1.5% from two or more races. 1.5% of the population were Hispanic or Latino of any race.

There were 5,652 households, out of which 27.3% had children under the age of 18 living with them, 48.7% were married couples living together, 15.6% had a female householder with no husband present, and 31.3% were non-families. 28.1% of all households were made up of individuals, and 11.9% had someone living alone who was 65 years of age or older. The average household size was 2.44 and the average family size was 2.97.

In the county, the population was spread out, with 23.8% under the age of 18, 8.0% from 18 to 24, 23.6% from 25 to 44, 28.7% from 45 to 64, and 15.9% who were 65 years of age or older. The median age was 40.7 years. For every 100 females there were 93.4 males. For every 100 females age 18 and over, there were 95.3 males.

The median income for a household in the county was $35,140, and the median income for a family was $47,685. Males had a median income of $35,598 versus $22,410 for females. The per capita income for the county was $19,793. About 13.7% of families and 17.7% of the population were below the poverty line, including 25.5% of those under age 18 and 16.7% of those age 65 or over.

The largest self-reported ancestry groups in Crenshaw County were English (64.5%), German (12.1%), Irish (11.2%), Italian (3.9%), "American" (3.1%), Scottish (2.9%) and Portuguese (1.8%).

=== 2000 census ===
As of the census of 2000, there were 13,665 people, 5,577 households, and 3,892 families living in the county. The population density was 22 people per square mile (8.5 people/km^{2}). There were 6,644 housing units at an average density of 11 units per square mile (4.2 units/km^{2}). The racial makeup of the county was 73.82% White, 24.79% Black or African American, 0.37% Native American, 0.11% Asian, 0.01% Pacific Islander, 0.20% from other races, and 0.70% from two or more races. 0.64% of the population were Hispanic or Latino of any race.

There were 5,577 households, out of which 31.00% had children under the age of 18 living with them, 50.70% were married couples living together, 15.40% had a female householder with no husband present, and 30.20% were non-families. 28.20% of all households were made up of individuals, and 14.70% had someone living alone who was 65 years of age or older. The average household size was 2.42 and the average family size was 2.96.

In the county, the population was spread out, with 24.70% under the age of 18, 7.90% from 18 to 24, 26.30% from 25 to 44, 23.90% from 45 to 64, and 17.10% who were 65 years of age or older. The median age was 39 years. For every 100 females there were 89.80 males. For every 100 females age 18 and over, there were 83.60 males.

The median income for a household in the county was $26,054, and the median income for a family was $31,724. Males had a median income of $27,286 versus $17,703 for females. The per capita income for the county was $14,565. About 18.60% of families and 22.10% of the population were below the poverty line, including 28.30% of those under age 18 and 23.50% of those age 65 or over.

== Government ==
Crenshaw County is reliably Republican at the presidential level. The last Democrat to win the county in a presidential election is Bill Clinton, who won it by a plurality in 1996.

United States presidential election results for Crenshaw County, Alabama
Year	Republican		Democratic		Third party(ies)	
Year	No.	%	No.	%	No.	%
1904	180	13.25%	1,077	79.25%	102	7.51%
1908	311	20.94%	1,100	74.07%	74	4.98%
1912	47	4.03%	986	84.49%	134	11.48%
1916	139	8.81%	1,427	90.43%	12	0.76%
1920	310	17.93%	1,411	81.61%	8	0.46%
1924	117	9.41%	1,107	89.06%	19	1.53%
1928	978	42.67%	1,314	57.33%	0	0.00%
1932	127	5.32%	2,200	92.13%	61	2.55%
1936	96	3.89%	2,371	95.95%	4	0.16%
1940	84	3.03%	2,680	96.65%	9	0.32%
1944	118	5.61%	1,980	94.06%	7	0.33%
1948	38	2.65%	0	0.00%	1,394	97.35%
1952	544	17.94%	2,485	81.96%	3	0.10%
1956	567	19.06%	2,252	75.70%	156	5.24%
1960	573	16.37%	2,923	83.49%	5	0.14%
1964	3,008	78.66%	0	0.00%	816	21.34%
1968	209	3.81%	726	13.25%	4,545	82.94%
1972	3,129	72.87%	1,085	25.27%	80	1.86%
1976	1,801	34.20%	3,372	64.03%	93	1.77%
1980	2,478	47.15%	2,704	51.45%	74	1.41%
1984	3,261	61.86%	1,904	36.12%	107	2.03%
1988	2,617	58.44%	1,836	41.00%	25	0.56%
1992	2,339	44.22%	2,404	45.44%	547	10.34%
1996	1,939	43.60%	2,172	48.84%	336	7.56%
2000	2,793	58.25%	1,934	40.33%	68	1.42%
2004	3,777	68.67%	1,698	30.87%	25	0.45%
2008	4,319	68.65%	1,938	30.81%	34	0.54%
2012	4,331	67.42%	2,050	31.91%	43	0.67%
2016	4,513	72.01%	1,664	26.55%	90	1.44%
2020	4,864	73.51%	1,700	25.69%	53	0.80%
2024	5,000	77.09%	1,457	22.46%	29	0.45%

United States Senate election results for Crenshaw County, Alabama2
Year	Republican		Democratic		Third party(ies)	
Year	No.	%	No.	%	No.	%
2020	4,671	70.89%	1,910	28.99%	8	0.12%

United States Senate election results for Crenshaw County, Alabama3
Year	Republican		Democratic		Third party(ies)	
Year	No.	%	No.	%	No.	%
2022	3,607	79.07%	895	19.62%	60	1.32%

Alabama Gubernatorial election results for Crenshaw County
Year	Republican		Democratic		Third party(ies)	
Year	No.	%	No.	%	No.	%
2022	3,622	79.07%	851	18.58%	108	2.36%

== Communities ==
=== City ===
- Luverne (county seat)

=== Towns ===
- Brantley
- Dozier
- Glenwood
- Petrey
- Rutledge

=== Unincorporated communities ===
- Fullers Crossroads
- Highland Home
- Honoraville
- Lapine (partly in Montgomery County)
- Moodys Crossroads
- Mulberry
- Panola
- Theba
- Weedville

== See also ==
- Crenshaw County School District
- National Register of Historic Places listings in Crenshaw County, Alabama
- Properties on the Alabama Register of Landmarks and Heritage in Crenshaw County, Alabama
