= Luverne, Alabama =

City in Alabama, United States

Luverne
- City
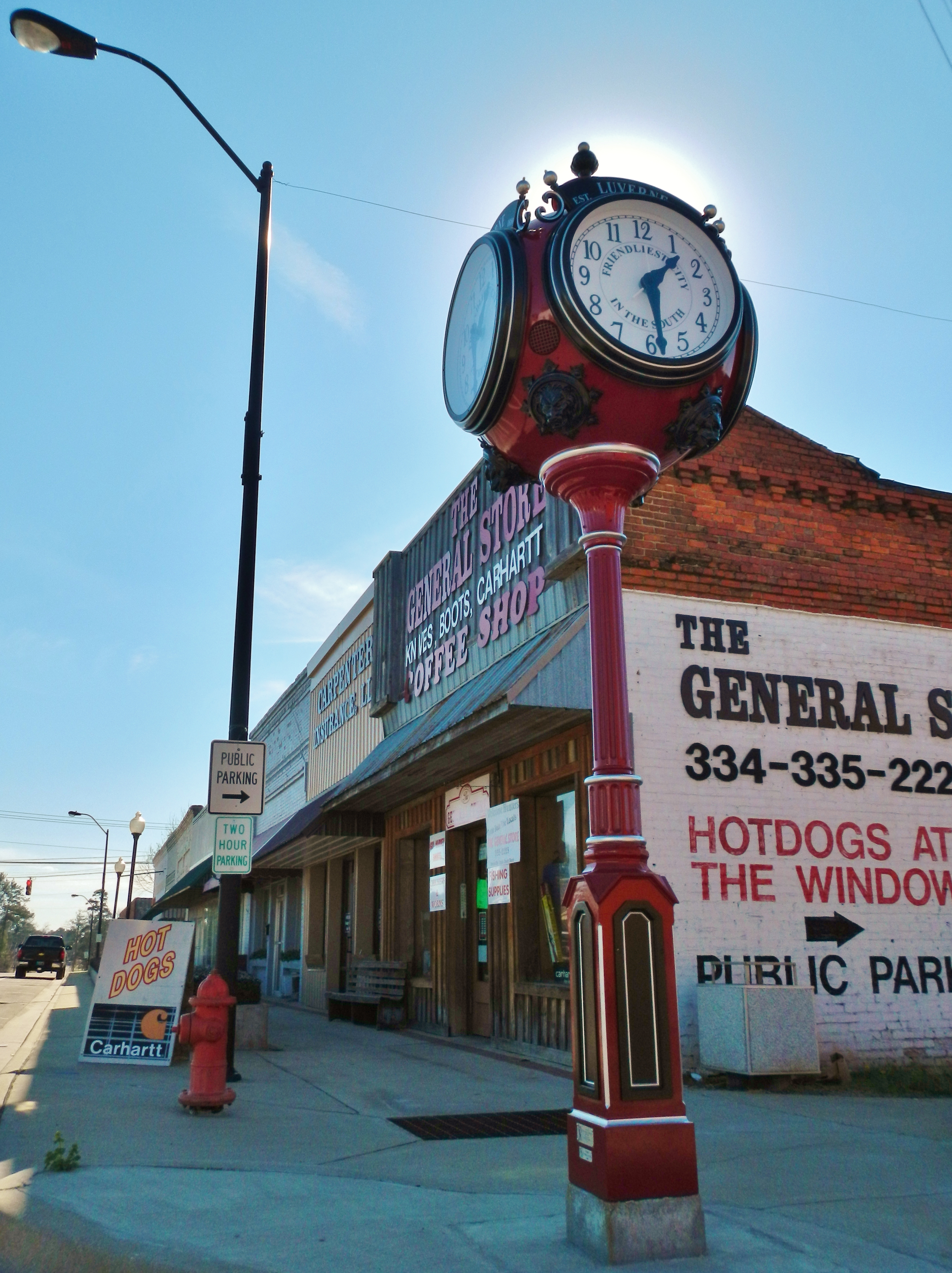
- Downtown Luverne
- Nickname: "Friendliest City in the South"
- Location of Luverne in Crenshaw County, Alabama.
- Coordinates: 31°42′52″N 86°15′48″W
- Country: United States
- State: Alabama
- County: Crenshaw
- Founded: 1889
- Incorporated: February 6, 1891
- Founder: M.P. Legrand, S.D. Hubbard, and George A. Folmar

Government
  - Type: Mayor–council
  - Mayor: Ed Beasley

Area
  - Total: 15.68 sq mi (40.60 km^{2})
  - Land: 15.65 sq mi (40.53 km^{2})
  - Water: 0.027 sq mi (0.07 km^{2})
- Elevation: 354 ft (108 m)

Population (2020)
  - Total: 2,765
  - Density: 176.7/sq mi (68.23/km^{2})
- Time zone: UTC-6 (Central (CST))
  - Summer (DST): UTC-5 (CDT)
- ZIP Code: 36049
- Area code: 334
- FIPS code: 01-44728
- GNIS feature ID: 0122110
- Website: www.luverne.org

Luverne (/luːˈvɜːrn, ləˈvɜːrn/ loo-VURN) is a city in and the county seat of Crenshaw County, Alabama, United States. At the 2020 census, the population was 2,765.

== History ==
Luverne was one of numerous towns developed in the state as a result of railroad construction.

On July 2, 1880, the Montgomery and Southern Railway was created to construct a new railroad linking Montgomery to the Florida coast. The company completed around 30 miles (48 km) of narrow gauge track by September 18, 1882. The company was reorganized as the Montgomery and Florida Railway in May 1886, and a second time as the Northwest and Florida Railroad in 1888. In November 1888, the railroad reached the site of Luverne in the central part of Crenshaw County, near the Patsaliga River. Now totaling 51 miles (82 km), the line was converted to standard gauge by July 1889, and it was decided to proceed no further. The Alabama Terminal and Improvement Company, a subsidiary of the Alabama Midland Railway, controlled the railroad by 1889, and the line from Montgomery to Luverne was into the network of the latter.

The new railroad terminus attracted related development, and the town grew. It was incorporated in 1891 and became a center of timbering in the Piney Woods of southern Alabama, as the land was not fertile enough for large-scale cotton plantation agriculture.

In 1893, the citizens of Crenshaw County voted to move the county seat from Rutledge to the more populous Luverne.

On June 22, 1940, an African-American man named Jesse Thornton was lynched in Luverne for failing to address a white man with the title of "Mister". He was fatally shot, and his body was later found in the Patsaliga River. The Equal Justice Initiative documented that the white man Thornton had offended by his Jim Crow infraction was a police officer. This was the only lynching recorded in the county.

== Geography ==
Luverne is located at 31°42′52″N 86°15′48″W. The town of Rutledge lies along Luverne's western border.

According to the U.S. Census Bureau, the city has a total area of 15.7 square miles (40.6 km^{2}), of which 15.6 square miles (40.5 km^{2}) is land and 0.04 square miles (0.1 km^{2}), or 0.17%, is water.

=== Climate ===
According to the Köppen climate classification, Luverne has a humid subtropical climate (abbreviated Cfa).

Climate data for Luverne, 1991–2020 simulated normals (341 ft elevation)
Month	Jan	Feb	Mar	Apr	May	Jun	Jul	Aug	Sep	Oct	Nov	Dec	Year
Mean daily maximum °F (°C)	59.2 (15.1)	63.5 (17.5)	70.7 (21.5)	77.2 (25.1)	84.6 (29.2)	89.4 (31.9)	91.4 (33.0)	90.9 (32.7)	87.4 (30.8)	79.0 (26.1)	69.1 (20.6)	61.7 (16.5)	77.0 (25.0)
Daily mean °F (°C)	47.5 (8.6)	51.3 (10.7)	58.1 (14.5)	64.4 (18.0)	72.3 (22.4)	78.8 (26.0)	81.1 (27.3)	80.6 (27.0)	76.5 (24.7)	66.6 (19.2)	56.1 (13.4)	50.4 (10.2)	65.3 (18.5)
Mean daily minimum °F (°C)	35.8 (2.1)	39.2 (4.0)	45.3 (7.4)	51.6 (10.9)	60.1 (15.6)	68.0 (20.0)	70.7 (21.5)	70.3 (21.3)	65.5 (18.6)	54.1 (12.3)	43.2 (6.2)	38.8 (3.8)	53.6 (12.0)
Average precipitation inches (mm)	5.16 (130.98)	4.73 (120.14)	5.28 (134.13)	4.63 (117.69)	3.71 (94.31)	5.25 (133.41)	5.80 (147.36)	5.14 (130.68)	4.26 (108.16)	3.34 (84.75)	4.29 (108.85)	5.31 (134.84)	56.9 (1,445.3)
Average dew point °F (°C)	38.5 (3.6)	41.4 (5.2)	46.0 (7.8)	52.5 (11.4)	60.8 (16.0)	68.2 (20.1)	71.1 (21.7)	70.7 (21.5)	66.2 (19.0)	55.9 (13.3)	46.6 (8.1)	41.9 (5.5)	55.0 (12.8)
Source: PRISM Climate Group

== Demographics ==
Historical population
Census	Pop.	Note	%±
1890	451		—
1900	731		62.1%
1910	1,384		89.3%
1920	1,464		5.8%
1930	1,874		28.0%
1940	2,243		19.7%
1950	2,221		−1.0%
1960	2,238		0.8%
1970	2,440		9.0%
1980	2,639		8.2%
1990	2,555		−3.2%
2000	2,635		3.1%
2010	2,800		6.3%
2020	2,765		−1.2%
U.S. Decennial Census; 2013 Estimate

=== 2020 census ===
As of the 2020 census, Luverne had a population of 2,765. The median age was 45.5 years. 20.3% of residents were under the age of 18 and 24.1% of residents were 65 years of age or older. For every 100 females, there were 80.2 males, and for every 100 females age 18 and over, there were 74.0 males age 18 and over.

0.0% of residents lived in urban areas, while 100.0% lived in rural areas.

There were 1,184 households in Luverne, of which 28.8% had children under the age of 18 living in them. Of all households, 36.6% were married-couple households, 18.2% were households with a male householder and no spouse or partner present, and 41.5% were households with a female householder and no spouse or partner present. About 36.6% of all households were made up of individuals, and 17.2% had someone living alone who was 65 years of age or older. The city had 634 families.

There were 1,346 housing units, of which 12.0% were vacant. The homeowner vacancy rate was 1.9% and the rental vacancy rate was 9.7%.

Luverne racial composition
Race	Num.	Perc.
White (non-Hispanic)	1,707	61.74%
Black or African American (non-Hispanic)	858	31.03%
Native American	2	0.07%
Asian	37	1.34%
Pacific Islander	2	0.07%
Other/Mixed	119	4.3%
Hispanic or Latino	40	1.45%

=== 2010 census ===
As of the census of 2010, there were 2,800 people, 1,135 households, and 729 families living in the city. The racial makeup of the city was 62.6% White, 29.6% Black or African American, 0.3% Native American, 5.5% Asian, 0.3% Pacific Islander, 0.8% from other races, and 1.0% from two or more races. 1.9% of the population was Hispanic or Latino of any race.

Of the 1,135 households, 26.9% had children under the age of 18 living with them, 41.7% were married couples living together (2.4% same-sex couples), 19.2% had a female householder with no husband present, and 35.8% were non-families. 32.8% of households were one person, and 14.8% were one person aged 65 or older. The average household size was 2.35, and the average family size was 2.95.

The age distribution was 23.8% under the age of 18, 7.9% from 18 to 24, 22.4% from 25 to 44, 26.3% from 45 to 64, and 19.7% 65 or older. The median age was 41.2 years. For every 100 females, there were 84.6 males. For every 100 females age 18 and over, there were 85.3 males.

The median household income was $40,602, and the median family income was $51,500. Males had a median income of $43,464 versus $19,483 for females. The per capita income for the city was $18,869. About 12.6% of families and 15.8% of the population were below the poverty line, including 11.8% of those under age 18 and 20.6% of those age 65 or over.

=== 2000 census ===
As of the census of 2000, there were 2,635 people, 1,107 households, and 710 families living in the city. The population density was 212.7 inhabitants per square mile (82.1/km^{2}). There were 1,249 housing units at an average density of 100.8 per square mile (38.9/km^{2}). The racial makeup of the city was 70.25% White, 28.43% Black or African American, 0.08% Native American, 0.15% Asian, 0.04% Pacific Islander, 0.11% from other races, and 0.95% from two or more races. 0.68% of the population was Hispanic or Latino of any race.

Of the 1,107 households, 28.9% had children under the age of 18 living with them, 42.7% were married couples living together (2.4% same-sex couples), 19.5% had a female householder with no husband present, and 35.8% were non-families. 33.8% of households were one-person and 19.2% were one-person households aged 65 or older. The average household size was 2.24, and the average family size was 2.85.

The age distribution was 23.0% under the age of 18, 6.8% from 18 to 24, 23.4% from 25 to 44, 23.3% from 45 to 64, and 23.4% 65 or older. The median age was 42 years. For every 100 females, there were 77.0 males. For every 100 females age 18 and over, there were 71.1 males.

The median household income was $22,457, and the median family income was $30,950. Males had a median income of $30,680 versus $17,813 for females. The per capita income for the city was $17,244. About 19.2% of families and 22.7% of the population were below the poverty line, including 31.3% of those under age 18 and 18.9% of those age 65 or over.

== Education ==
- Primary and secondary education

Public education for the city of Luverne is provided by the Crenshaw County School District. There are two schools in the city: Luverne High School (grades K through 12) and Crenshaw Christian Academy, a private, religiously oriented K-12 school.

- Post-secondary education

Lurleen B. Wallace Community College offers certificates and two-year associate's degrees at its Luverne location.

== Media ==
- Radio station
  - WHLW 104.3 FM (Gospel)
  - WSMX-FM 100.3 FM (Country/Gospel)
- Newspaper
  - Luverne Journal (weekly)
- Television
  - Hunt Channel TV

== Notable people ==
- Chester Adams, former American football player
- Dorothy Bendross-Mindingall, former member of the Florida House of Representatives
- Wendell Mitchell, Democratic member of the Alabama Senate, representing the 30th District from 1974 to 2010
- Donta Hall, American basketball player

== Gallery ==
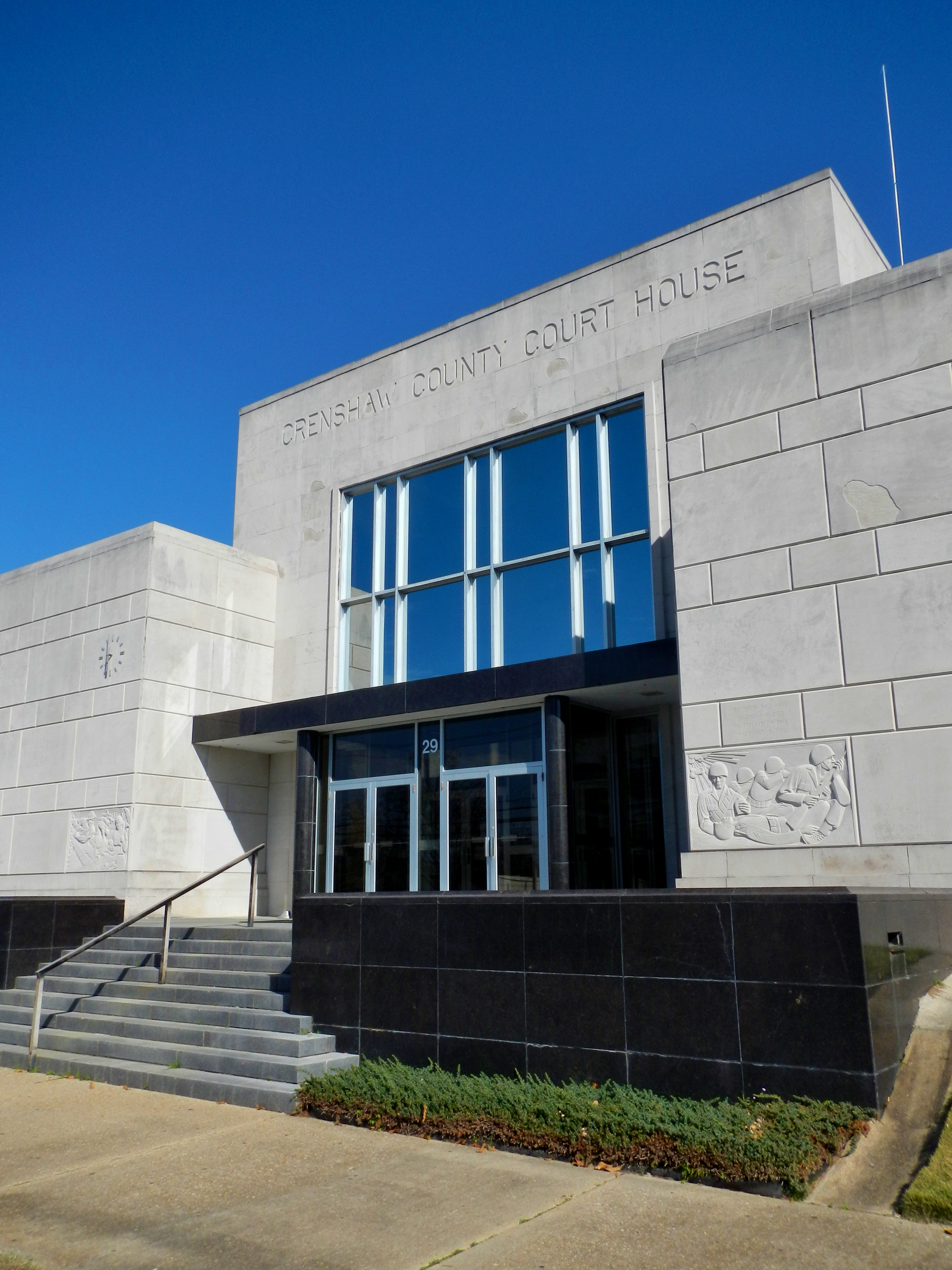
The Crenshaw County Courthouse in Luverne

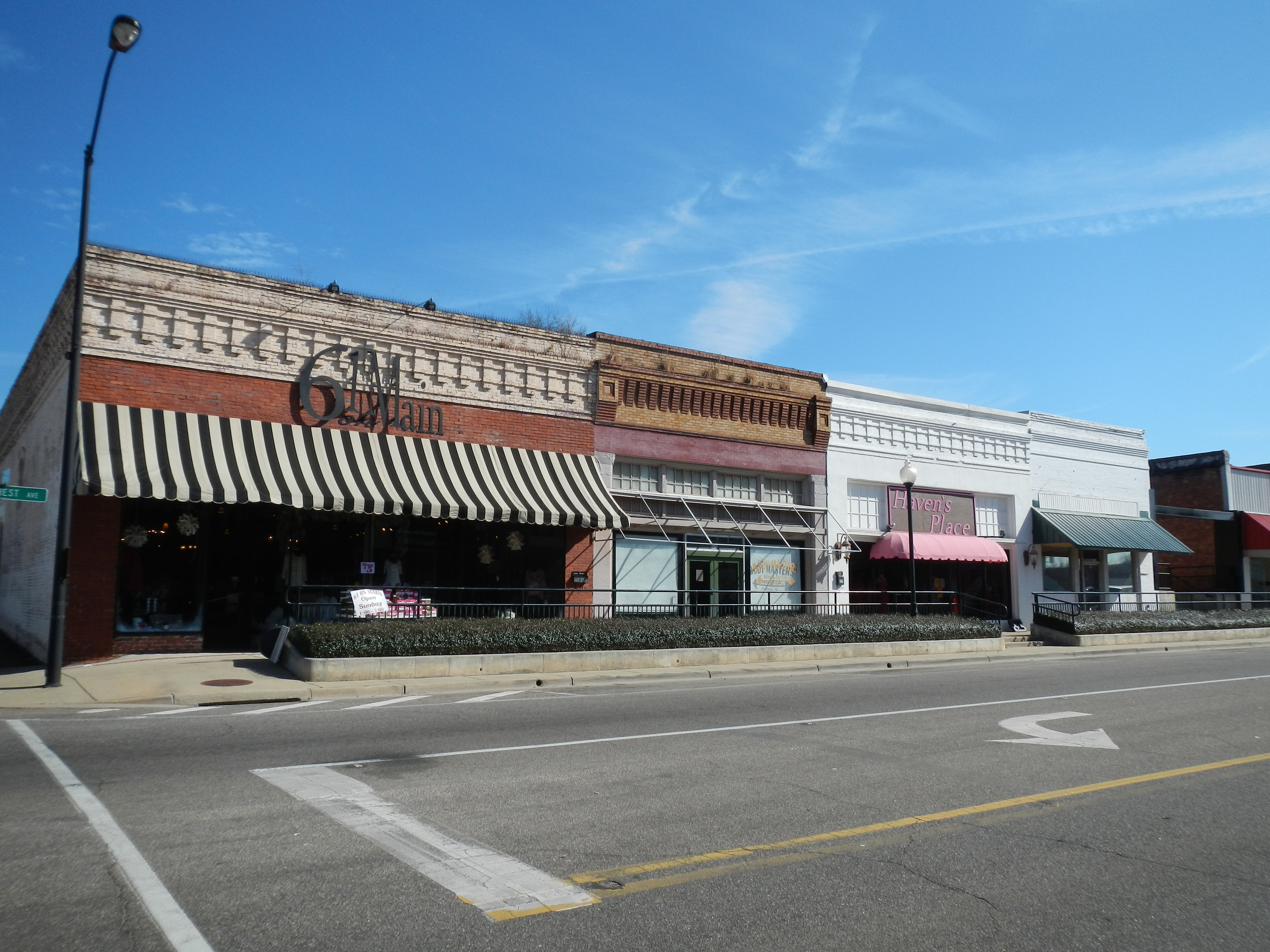
The Luverne Historic District, bounded by 1st, 6th Streets, Legrande, Glenwood, Folmar, and Hawkins Avenues, was added to the National Register of Historic Places on January 14, 2005.

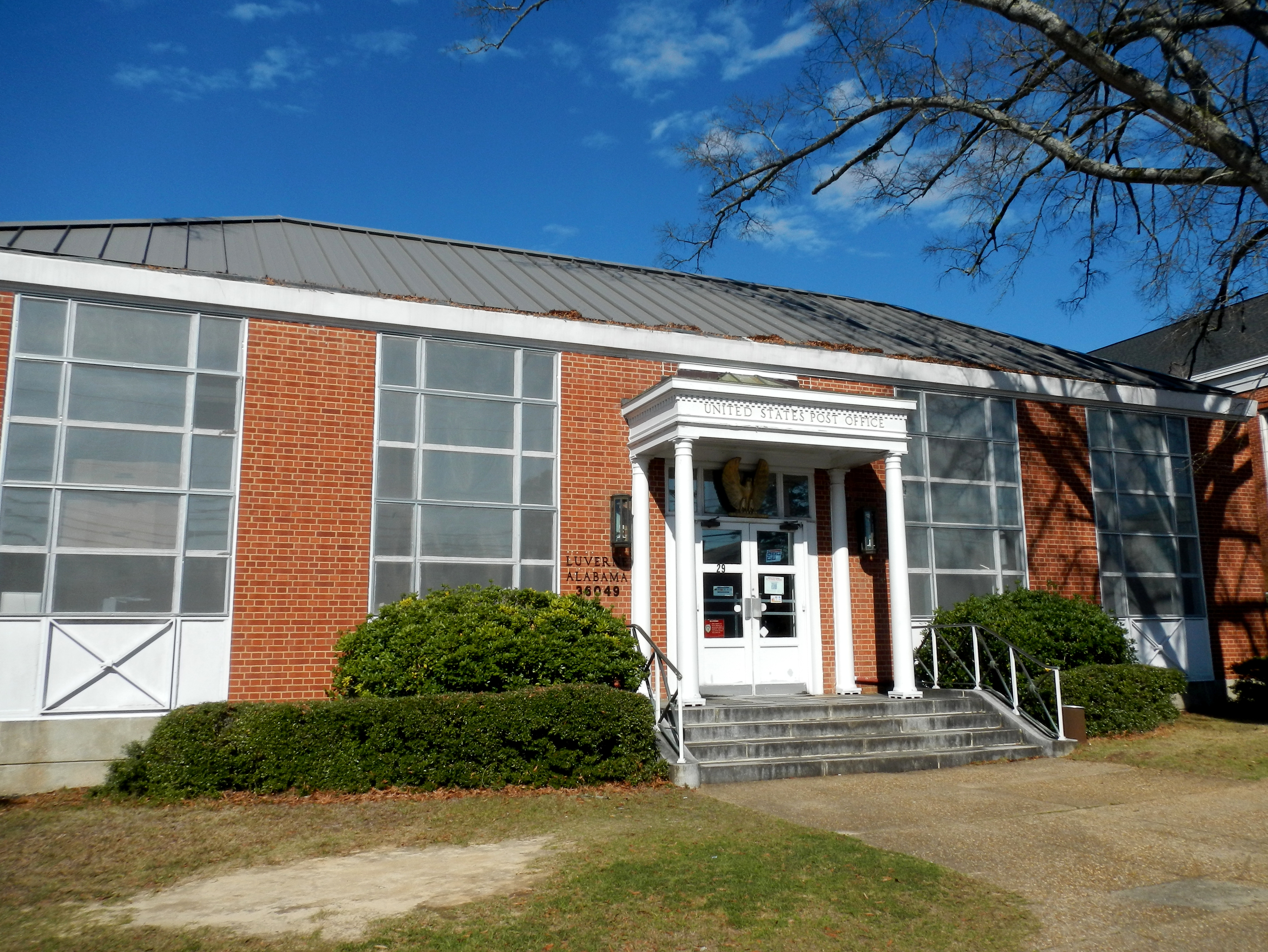
Luverne Post Office (ZIP code: 36049)

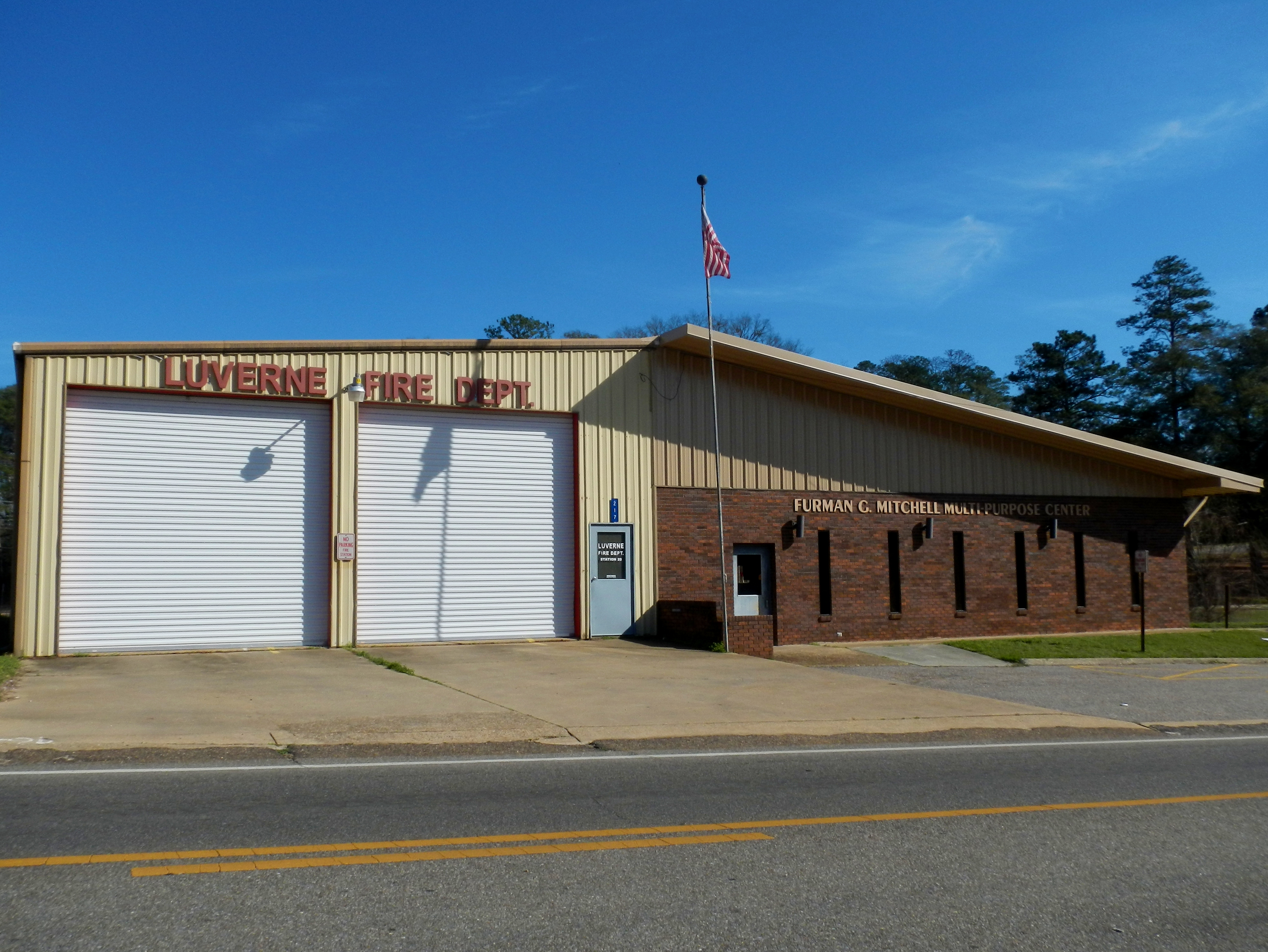
Luverne Fire Department and Furman G. Mitchell Multi-Purpose Center

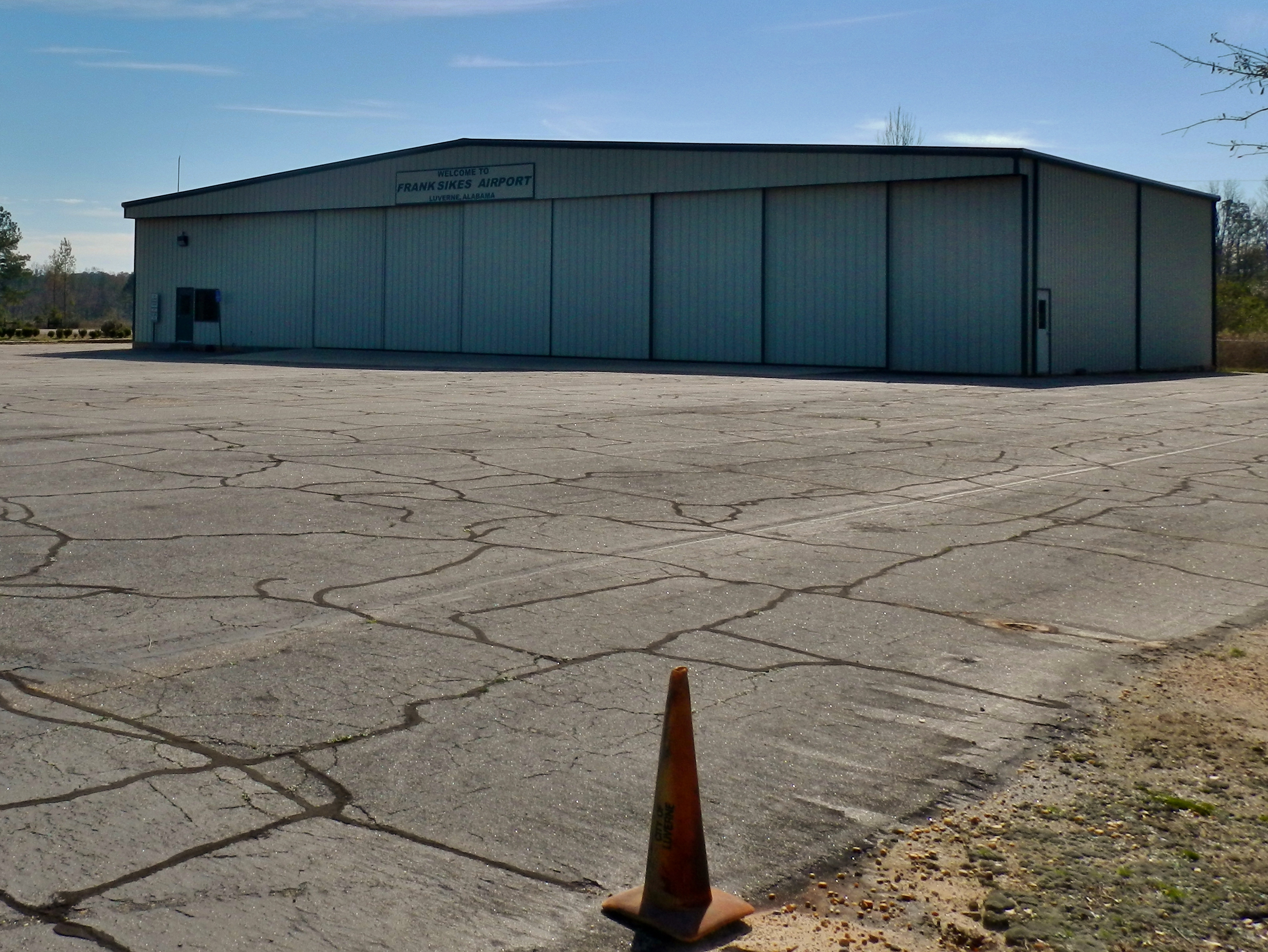
Frank Sikes Airport
