= List of unincorporated communities in Alabama =

Map of the United States with Alabama highlighted

Unincorporated communities lacking elected municipal officers and boundaries with legal status, but are not classified as Census-designated places (CDPs).

Place Name	County(ies)
Abel	Clay County
Abernant	Tuscaloosa County
Acmar	St. Clair County
Ada	Montgomery County
Adger	Jefferson County
Alabama City	Etowah County
Alabama Port	Mobile County
Alberta	Wilcox County
Allen	Clarke County
Alma	Clarke County
Almond	Randolph County
Alpine	Talladega County
Alton	Jefferson County
Anne Manie	Wilcox County
Arkadelphia	Cullman County
Arlington	Wilcox County
Bangor	Blount County
Bankston	Fayette County
Battens Crossroads	Geneva County
Bazemore	Fayette County
Belle Mina	Limestone County
Belleville	Conecuh County
Bellwood	Geneva County
Beulah	Lee County
Beauregard	Lee County
Big Cove	Madison County
Birmingport	Jefferson County
Bladon Springs	Choctaw County
Blount Springs	Blount County
Bluff	Fayette County
Bolling	Butler County
Bon Secour	Baldwin County
Booth	Autauga County
Bradford	Jefferson County
Braggs	Lowndes County
Bremen	Cullman County
Branchville	St. Clair County
Brierfield	Bibb County
Bromley	Baldwin County
Brooklyn	Conecuh County
Brooksville	Blount County
Browns	Dallas County
Brownsboro	Madison County
Bryant	Jackson County
Buena Vista	Monroe County
Buhl	Tuscaloosa County
Bull Slough	Conecuh County
Burkville	Lowndes County
Bermuda	Conecuh County
Burgreen Gin	Limestone County
Burningtree Mountain	Morgan County
Burnt Corn	Monroe County
Burntout	Franklin County
Burnwell	Walker County
Caddo	Lawrence County
Cahaba	Dallas County
Campbell	Clarke County
Capshaw	Limestone County
Cecil	Montgomery County
Centerville	Conecuh County
Chancellor	Geneva County
Chapman	Butler County
Clopton	Dale County
Cloverdale	Lauderdale County
Coden	Mobile County
Cook Springs	St. Clair County
Corner	Jefferson County
Cottondale	Tuscaloosa County
Cottonton	Russell County
Coy	Wilcox County
Cragford	Clay County
Crane Hill	Cullman County
Crawford	Russell County
Cromwell	Choctaw County
Cropwell	St. Clair County
Dallas	Blount County
Danville	Morgan County
Dawson	DeKalb County
De Armanville	Calhoun County
Delmar	Winston County
Dickinson	Clarke County
Dixiana	Jefferson County
Dixons Mills	Marengo County
Docena	Jefferson County
Dolomite	Jefferson County
Duncanville	Tuscaloosa County
Eastaboga	Calhoun County
Eight Mile	Mobile County
Elgin	Lauderdale County
Empire	Walker County
Equality	Coosa County
Flat Rock	Jackson County
Fort McClellan	Calhoun County
Fort Mitchell	Russell County
Fort Morgan	Baldwin County
Franklin	Monroe County
French Mill	Limestone County
Gallion	Hale County
Gorham's Bluff	Jackson County
Grady	Montgomery County
Green Pond	Bibb County
Grove Oak	DeKalb County
Hatchechubbee	Russell County
Higdon	Jackson County
Highland Home	Crenshaw County
Holy Trinity	Russell County
Hope Hull	Montgomery County
Houston	Winston County
Hulaco	Morgan County
Inverness	Bullock County
Inverness	Shelby County
Irvington	Mobile County
Jack	Coffee County
Java	Coffee County
Kellerman	Tuscaloosa County
Kent	Elmore County
Kimbrough	Wilcox County
Knoxville	Greene County
Lacey's Spring	Morgan County
Lacon	Morgan County
Lake Purdy	Shelby County
Le Moyne	Mobile County
Lenox	Conecuh County
Letohatchee	Lowndes County
Lillian	Baldwin County
Lower Peachtree	Wilcox County
Marion Junction	Dallas County
Marvyn	Lee County
McCalla	Jefferson County
Millers Ferry	Wilcox County
Mon Louis	Mobile County
Montrose	Baldwin County
Morgan City	Morgan County
Moulton Heights	Morgan County
Mount High	Blount County
Mount Hope	Lawrence County
Mount Meigs	Montgomery County
Mountain Creek	Chilton County
Newell	Randolph County
Normal	Madison County
Oakville	Lawrence County
Orion	Pike County
Palmerdale	Jefferson County
Perote	Bullock County
Peterson	Tuscaloosa County
Plantersville	Dallas County
Prairieville	Hale County
Quinton	Walker County
Ralph	Tuscaloosa County
Ramer	Montgomery County
Range	Conecuh County
Red Hill	Blount County
Remlap	Blount County
Safford	Dallas County
Saginaw	Shelby County
Salem	Lee County
Samantha	Tuscaloosa County
Sawyerville	Hale County
Sayre	Jefferson County
Seale	Russell County
Seminole	Baldwin County
Semmes	Mobile County
Snow Hill	Wilcox County
Spring Hill	Barbour County
Spring Valley	Colbert County
Sprott	Perry County
St. Clair Springs	St. Clair County
Stapleton	Baldwin County
Stockton	Baldwin County
Summit	Blount County
Tannehill	Tuscaloosa County
Tanner	Limestone County
Tensaw	Baldwin County
Valhermoso Springs	Morgan County
Verbena	Chilton County
Vineland	Marengo County
Vinemont	Cullman County
Wagarville	Washington County
Watson	Jefferson County
Waugh	Montgomery County
Wilmer	Mobile County
Winterboro	Talladega County
Wren	Lawrence County
Yellow Pine	Washington County

== See also ==
- List of cities and towns in Alabama
- List of census-designated places in Alabama
