= National Register of Historic Places listings in Coffee County, Alabama =

Location of Coffee County in Alabama

This is a list of the National Register of Historic Places listings in Coffee County, Alabama.

This is intended to be a complete list of the properties and districts on the National Register of Historic Places in Coffee County, Alabama, United States. Latitude and longitude coordinates are provided for many National Register properties and districts; these locations may be seen together in a Google map.

There are five properties and districts listed on the National Register in the county.

This National Park Service list is complete through NPS recent listings posted January 2, 2026.

	Name on the Register	Image	Date listed	Location	City or town	Description
1	Boll Weevil Monument	Boll Weevil Monument	April 26, 1973 (#73000336)	Main and College Sts. 31°18′52″N 85°51′14″W	Enterprise	
2	Coffee County Courthouse	Coffee County Courthouse	May 8, 1973 (#73000335)	Courthouse Sq. 31°24′45″N 86°03′44″W	Elba	
3	Pea River Power Company Hydroelectric Facility		August 1, 1984 (#84000602)	South of Elba; 31°21′47″N 86°05′40″W	Elba	
4	Rawls Hotel	Rawls Hotel	September 17, 1980 (#80000684)	116 S. Main St. 31°18′16″N 85°51′15″W	Enterprise	
5	Seaboard Coastline Depot	Seaboard Coastline Depot	August 7, 1974 (#74000405)	Corner of Railroad and W. College Sts. 31°18′47″N 85°51′15″W	Enterprise	Originally built by Alabama Midland Railway, it currently houses Enterprise's Depot Museum.

== See also ==
- List of National Historic Landmarks in Alabama
- National Register of Historic Places listings in Alabama
