= Alabama State Route 167 =

State highway in Alabama, United States

State Route 167

Route information
- Maintained by ALDOT
- Length: 60.032 mi (96.612 km)

Major junctions
- South end: SR 79 in Esto, FL
- US 84 in Enterprise
- North end: US 231 / SR 10 in Troy

Location
- Country: United States
- State: Alabama
- Counties: Geneva, Dale, Coffee, Pike

Highway system
- Alabama State Highway System; Interstate; US; State
← SR 166	→ SR 168

State Route 167 (SR 167) is a 60-mile-long route in the southeastern part of the state. The southern terminus of the route is at the Florida state line, where State Road 79 (SR 79) crosses into Geneva County, Alabama. The northern terminus of the route is at the junction with U.S. Route 231/SR 10 in Troy.

== Route description ==
SR 167 passes through largely rural areas in southeastern Alabama. Except for a brief stretch as the route passes through Enterprise, SR 167 travels on two-lane roads for the duration of its route. It serves as an alternate route to US 231 for travellers heading to and from Panama City, Florida, and serves as an emergency access route during hurricane emergencies.

== Major intersections ==
County	Location	mi	km	Destinations	Notes
Geneva		0.000	0.000	SR 79 south – Panama City Beach	Continuation beyond Florida state line; southern terminus
Geneva		6.884	11.079	SR 123 north / CR 61 south	
Geneva	Hartford	8.063	12.976	SR 52 – Geneva, Hartford	
Dale		16.187	26.050	SR 85 – Geneva, Daleville, Fort Novosel, Bellwood, Clayhatchee	
Coffee		20.872	33.590	SR 92 east – Dothan, Clayhatchee	
Coffee	Enterprise	23.948	38.541	SR 88 west / SR 192 west (Boll Weevil Circle) to SR 27 south – Geneva	
Coffee	Enterprise	24.708	39.764	US 84 east / SR 134 (East Park Avenue / SR 12) – Fort Novosel, Daleville, Dothan	South end of US 84 overlap
Coffee	Enterprise	25.812	41.540	SR 248 (Glover Avenue / Rucker Boulevard) – Fort Novosel, U.S. Aviation Museum	
Coffee	Enterprise	26.403	42.492	SR 27 – Ozark	
Coffee	Enterprise	27.794	44.730	US 84 west (Boll Weevil Circle / SR 12) – Elba	North end of US 84 overlap
Coffee		34.331	55.250	SR 51 south – New Brockton	South end of SR 51 overlap
Coffee		34.449	55.440	SR 51 north – Ariton	North end of SR 51 overlap
Coffee		42.707	68.730	SR 125 – Elba, Brundidge	
Pike		52.445	84.402	SR 87 south / CR 3316 – Zion Chapel, Elba	South end of SR 87 overlap
Pike	Troy	60.032	96.612	US 231 / SR 10 (SR 53) – Montgomery, Luverne, Brundidge	Northern terminus of SR 87 and SR 167
1.000 mi = 1.609 km; 1.000 km = 0.621 mi: Concurrency terminus
