= Alabama State Route 203 =

State highway in Alabama, United States

State Route 203

Route information
- Maintained by ALDOT
- Length: 3.080 mi (4.957 km)
- Existed: 1949–2022
- History: 1949-1955 (1st route) 1961-1972 (2nd route) 1985-2022 (3rd route)

Major junctions
- South end: SR 189 in Elba
- North end: SR 125 in Elba

Location
- Country: United States
- State: Alabama
- Counties: Coffee

Highway system
- Alabama State Highway System; Interstate; US; State
← SR 202	→ SR 204

State Route 203 (SR 203) was a 3.080-mile-long (4.957 km) route that served as a bypass around the northern and western portions of the town of Elba in Coffee County.

== Historical Routes ==
SR 203 had previously existed 2 other times in two different areas in Alabama.

The first route was from in Lawrence County around Oakville from 1949-1955 and stretched 7.2 miles (11.59km). The northern terminus was at SR 24 (now Lawrence County Road 87) and its southern terminus was at the northern border of the Bankhead National Forest at Lawrence County Road 194. Currently, it is signed as Lawrence CR 203 and Lawrence CR 81.

The second route was located in Houston County south of Dothan from 1961-1973 and stretched 15.7 miles (25.27km). The northern terminus was at US 231, about 300ft south of the Dothan Beltline, and the southern terminus was the Florida State line after a brief 1/3 mile concurrency. Around halfway, it passes through the town of Rehobeth.

== Modern Route description ==
The most recent SR203 was located in Coffee County from 1985 to 2022. The southern terminus of SR 203 was located at its intersection with SR 189 south of central Elba. From this point, the route travelled in a northwesterly direction en route to US 84. From this point it began its gradual loop in a northeasterly direction before reaching its northern terminus at its junction with SR 125 northeast of central Elba.
