= Alabama State Route 92 =

State highway in Alabama, United States

State Route 92

Route information
- Maintained by ALDOT
- Length: 11.019 mi (17.733 km)
- Existed: 1962–present

Major junctions
- West end: SR 167 near Enterprise
- SR 85 in Clayhatchee
- East end: US 84 in southern Houston County

Location
- Country: United States
- State: Alabama
- Counties: Coffee, Dale, Houston

Highway system
- Alabama State Highway System; Interstate; US; State
← SR 91	→ SR 93

State Route 92 (SR 92) is an 11.019-mile-long (17.733 km) state highway in the southeastern part of the U.S. state of Alabama. The western terminus of the highway is at an intersection with SR 167 southeast of Enterprise. The eastern terminus of the highway is at an intersection with U.S. Route 84 (US 84) in rural Houston County north of the unincorporated community of Wicksburg.

== Route description ==
The current route of SR 92 travels through Coffee and Dale counties along a two-lane road, mainly through rural areas of Alabama's Wiregrass region and travels in a generally east–west orientation. The route shares a brief concurrency with SR 85 as it approaches Clayhatchee.

== History ==
While the current designation of SR 92 was formed in 1962, the route has undergone significant realignment since then. Initially, the route connected Daleville in Dale County and Wicksburg in Houston County, traveling in a southeasterly direction from an intersection with SR 85 to an intersection with US 84. The route was realigned in 1995 when it essentially exchanged routes with US 84. The former route of SR 92 was improved; becoming a four-lane divided highway, and US 84 was realigned to the enhanced roadway. By rerouting US 84 through Daleville, it provided access to Fort Rucker (now Fort Novosel) along a U.S. highway.

== Major intersections ==
County	Location	mi	km	Destinations	Notes
Coffee		0.000	0.000	SR 167 – Enterprise	Western terminus
Dale		4.328	6.965	SR 85 south – Geneva	Western end of SR 85 concurrency
Dale	Clayhatchee	5.065	8.151	SR 85 north – Daleville, Fort Novosel	Eastern end of SR 85 concurrency
Houston		11.019	17.733	US 84 (SR 12) – Dothan	Eastern terminus
1.000 mi = 1.609 km; 1.000 km = 0.621 mi: Concurrency terminus
