= Pea River Power Company Hydroelectric Facility =

- U.S. National Register of Historic Places
- Location within Alabama Location within the United States
- Location: South of Elba, Alabama
- Coordinates: 31°21′47″N 86°05′40″W
- Area: 27.9 acres (11.3 ha)
- Built: 1911
- NRHP reference No.: 84000602
- Added to NRHP: August 1, 1984

The Pea River Power Company Hydroelectric Facility, on the Pea River in Coffee County, Alabama, United States, near Elba, was built in 1911. The listing includes one contributing building and one contributing structure.

It is significant as "one of the earliest private ventures (1911–1914) in Alabama of the use of waterpower to produce electrical power and transmit it by high voltage lines to more than one destination", in this case to Troy, Alabama, 30 miles (48 km) away, and other locations not adjacent to the site.

"Along with two other hydroelectric facilities, both completed in 1930 and still in operation, the Elba facility was one of the original hydroelectric generating facilities owned by the Alabama Electric Cooperative. The A.E.C., which began operation in 1944 with aid from the Rural Electric Administration, was the driving force behind the electrification of central and south Alabama."
