= Alabama State Route 189 =

State highway in Alabama, United States

State Route 189

Route information
- Maintained by ALDOT
- Length: 32.857 mi (52.878 km)

Major junctions
- South end: SR 52
- US 84 / SR 12; SR 87
- North end: US 331 / SR 9

Location
- Country: United States
- State: Alabama
- Counties: Coffee, Crenshaw

Highway system
- Alabama State Highway System; Interstate; US; State
← SR 188	→ SR 191

State Route 189 (SR 189) is a 32.857-mile (52.878 km) state highway in Coffee and Crenshaw counties, in Alabama, United States, that serves as a connection between Kinston, Elba and Brantley. SR 189 intersects SR 52 at its southern terminus and US 331 at its northern terminus.

== Route description ==
SR 189 begins at its intersection with SR 52 in the central business district of Kinston. From this terminus, the route travels in an easterly direction prior to turning to the north as it exits the town. From this point, SR 189 generally travels in a north-northeast direction where it intersects both SR 134 and SR 141 en route to Elba. Within Elba, the route turns north in a concurrency with SR 203 and joins US 84 on the west side of the town. Upon leaving their brief concurrency with US 84, SR 189 and 203 turn north and east in a bypass of Elba. SR 189 then leaves SR 203 and generally travels in a northwesterly direction en route to its northern terminus at US 331 south of Brantley.

== Major intersections ==
County	Location	mi	km	Destinations	Notes
Coffee	Kinston	0.0	0.0	SR 52 – Geneva, Opp	Southern terminus
Coffee		4.957	7.978	SR 134 – Enterprise, Opp	
Coffee		10.228	16.460	SR 141 – Brantley	Southern terminus of SR 141
Coffee	Elba	15.453	24.869	SR 203	Southern terminus of SR 203; southern terminus of SR 189 / SR 203 concurrency
Coffee	Elba	16.37	26.34	US 84 east / SR 12 east – Elba	Southern terminus of SR 189 / US 84 / SR 12 concurrency
Coffee	Elba	16.46	26.49	US 84 west / SR 12 west – Brantley, Opp	Northern terminus of SR 189 / US 84 / SR 12 concurrency
Coffee	Elba	17.55	28.24	SR 203 north to SR 87 – Troy	Northern terminus of SR 189 / SR 203 concurrency
Crenshaw		32.80	52.79	US 331 / SR 9 – Opp, Brantley	Northern terminus
1.000 mi = 1.609 km; 1.000 km = 0.621 mi
