= Geneva County Reaper =

Newspaper in Genva County, Alabama

- Type: Weekly newspaper
- Format: Broadsheet
- Publisher: Mo Pujol
- Editor: Katherine Hepperle
- Founded: July 3, 1901
- Ceased publication: March 13, 2024
- Headquarters: 506 S. Commerce St., Geneva, Alabama, United States
- Circulation: 2,000
- OCLC number: 11827296
- Website: oppnewsonline.com

The Geneva County Reaper was a weekly newspaper published in Geneva County, Alabama from 1901 to 2024. Its most recent circulation was estimated at about 2,000. It was published by Mo Pujol and edited by Katherine Hepperle. The paper claimed to be "Geneva County's oldest and largest paper since 1899."

== History ==
The Reaper was founded as the Geneva Reaper on July 3, 1901, with Ed M. Johnson as editor and proprietor. The Reaper absorbed the competing Geneva Journal in 1902. By 1906, Johnson had moved purely to the business side of the paper, bringing on M. M. Brannen as head of editorial.

Horace J. Wilkinson took over the paper from his father, Horace G. Wilkinson. Horace J. printed the paper from 1928 until his sudden death in 1945, at the age of 48. Wilkinson made a note in his final printing of the paper, "Unless I feel stronger very quick, I won't attempt to issue a paper next week. I need a week's rest." He died 10 days later. The paper was purchased by Howard, Clarence, and Alton Scott but did not publish another edition until February 1946, months after Wilkinson died. In 1953, the three brothers also launched WGEA, the "Voice of the Geneva County Reaper." The station shut down in 2017.

Orsen Spivey, a former president of the Alabama Press Association, was editor of the paper from 1947 until 1954.

He handed the paper over to Joel P. Smith, who ran the paper until 1958. Sue Thomas became the general manager and editor in 1958. For some time it was edited and published by Karol Fleming, the second woman to be elected to the Alabama Journalism Hall of Fame.

Spivey sold the paper, along with three papers, to Specht Newspapers Inc. in 1984 for an undisclosed amount.

Brenda and Moe Pujol purchased the Opp News and Geneva County newspapers, including the Geneva County Reaper, in 2008. The formed Pujol Printing and Publishing LLC and operated the papers under that umbrella. Brenda Pujol died of breast cancer in 2016.

The Geneva County Reaper published its final issue on March 13, 2024. The Opp News, also owned by Pujol Publishing and Printing, ceased as well. Both paper's website and social media accounts were disabled. The paper's owner did not publicly give a reason for the closings.

In August 2024, several local journalists launched a new publication to replace the Reaper called the Geneva County Journal.
