= Alberton, Alabama =

Unincorporated community in Alabama, United States

- Unincorporated community
- Location within Alabama Location within the United States
- Coordinates: 31°16′41″N 86°07′33″W
- Country: United States
- State: Alabama
- County: Coffee
- Elevation: 171 ft (52 m)
- Time zone: UTC-6 (Central (CST))
  - Summer (DST): UTC-5 (CDT)
- Area code: 334
- GNIS feature ID: 112969

Alberton is an unincorporated community in Coffee County, Alabama, United States. Alberton is located along Alabama State Route 134, 9.7 miles (15.6 km) south-southwest of Elba.

== History ==
A post office operated under the name Alberton from 1878 to 1904.

== Demographics ==
According to the returns from 1850-2010 for Alabama, it has never reported a population figure separately on the U.S. Census.
