= Geneva High School =

Geneva High School may refer to:

- Geneva High School (Alabama), Geneva, Alabama
- Geneva High School (New York), Geneva, New York
- Geneva High School (Ohio), Geneva, Ohio
- Geneva Community High School, Geneva, Illinois
