= Alvin Henderson =

Alvin Henderson may refer to:

- Al Henderson, Trinidadian soccer forward
- Alvin Henderson (American football), American college football running back
