= Pine Level, Alabama =

Pine Level, Alabama may refer to:

- Pine Level, Autauga County, Alabama
- Pine Level, Coffee County, Alabama
- Pine Level, Montgomery County, Alabama
