= Clayhatchee, Alabama =

- Town
- Location of Clayhatchee in Dale County, Alabama.
- Coordinates: 31°14′45″N 85°42′52″W
- Country: United States
- State: Alabama
- County: Dale

Area
  - Total: 2.72 sq mi (7.04 km^{2})
  - Land: 2.72 sq mi (7.04 km^{2})
  - Water: 0 sq mi (0.00 km^{2})
- Elevation: 197 ft (60 m)

Population (2020)
  - Total: 466
  - Density: 171/sq mi (66.2/km^{2})
- Time zone: UTC-6 (Central (CST))
  - Summer (DST): UTC-5 (CDT)
- ZIP code: 36322
- Area code: 334
- FIPS code: 01-15304
- GNIS feature ID: 2406273

Clayhatchee is a town in Dale County, Alabama, United States. As of the 2020 census, Clayhatchee had a population of 466. It was incorporated in April 1967. It is part of the Ozark Micropolitan Statistical Area.

== Geography ==
Clayhatchee is located in southwestern Dale County between Claybank Creek to the west and the Choctawhatchee River to the east. Alabama State Route 92 passes through the center of town, leading east 20 miles (32 km) to Dothan (via U.S. Route 84) and northwest 10 miles (16 km) to Enterprise (via AL 167). Alabama State Route 85 leads north from Clayhatchee 5 miles (8 km) to Daleville and southwest 17 miles (27 km) to Geneva.

According to the U.S. Census Bureau, Clayhatchee has a total area of 2.72 square miles (7.04 km^{2}), all land.

== Demographics ==
Historical population
Census	Pop.	Note	%±
1970	505		—
1980	560		10.9%
1990	411		−26.6%
2000	501		21.9%
2010	589		17.6%
2020	466		−20.9%
U.S. Decennial Census; 2013 Estimate

As of the census of 2000, there were 501 people, 222 households, and 152 families residing in the town. The population density was 183.9 inhabitants per square mile (71.0/km^{2}). There were 267 housing units at an average density of 98.0 per square mile (37.8/km^{2}). The racial makeup of the town was 92.42% white, 4.19% black or African American, 0.60% Native American, 0.80% Asian, 0.20% from other races, and 1.80% from two or more races. 1.80% of the population were Hispanic or Latino of any race.

There were 222 households, out of which 23.0% had children under the age of 18 living with them, 51.4% were married couples living together, 11.7% had a female householder with no husband present, and 31.1% were non-families. 29.7% of all households were made up of individuals, and 12.6% had someone living alone who was 65 years of age or older. The average household size was 2.26 and the average family size was 2.75.

In the town, the population was spread out, with 21.0% under the age of 18, 8.4% from 18 to 24, 24.2% from 25 to 44, 29.7% from 45 to 64, and 16.8% who were 65 years of age or older. The median age was 42 years. For every 100 females, there were 98.0 males. For every 100 females age 18 and over, there were 101.0 males.

The median income for a household in the town was $30,156, and the median income for a family was $34,821. Males had a median income of $26,354 versus $21,250 for females. The per capita income for the town was $17,959. About 15.6% of families and 20.0% of the population were below the poverty line, including 31.2% of those under age 18 and 10.9% of those age 65 or over.

== Climate ==
The climate in this area is characterized by hot, humid summers and generally mild to cool winters. According to the Köppen Climate Classification system, Clayhatchee has a humid subtropical climate, abbreviated "Cfa" on climate maps.

Climate data for Clayhatchee, Alabama
Month	Jan	Feb	Mar	Apr	May	Jun	Jul	Aug	Sep	Oct	Nov	Dec	Year
Mean daily maximum °C (°F)	14 (57)	16 (60)	20 (68)	25 (77)	29 (84)	31 (87)	32 (89)	31 (87)	29 (84)	25 (77)	20 (68)	16 (60)	24 (75)
Mean daily minimum °C (°F)	3 (37)	5 (41)	8 (46)	13 (55)	17 (62)	20 (68)	21 (69)	21 (69)	19 (66)	13 (55)	7 (44)	4 (39)	12 (53)
Average precipitation mm (inches)	100 (4.1)	140 (5.5)	130 (5)	120 (4.6)	79 (3.1)	110 (4.5)	130 (5)	110 (4.5)	120 (4.8)	86 (3.4)	36 (1.4)	110 (4.5)	1,280 (50.2)
Source: Weatherbase
