= Siran Stacy =

American gridiron football player (born 1968)

No. 27, 28
- Position: Running back

Personal information
- Born: August 6, 1968 (age 58); Geneva, Alabama, U.S.
- Listed height: 5 ft 11 in (1.80 m)
- Listed weight: 203 lb (92 kg)

Career information
- High school: Geneva (AL)
- College: Alabama
- NFL draft: 1992: 2nd round, 48th overall pick

Career history
- Philadelphia Eagles (1992); Scottish Claymores (1995-1997); Saskatchewan Roughriders (2000); Scottish Claymores (2000)

Awards and highlights
- 2× First-team All-SEC (1989, 1991)
- Stats at Pro Football Reference

Siran Stacy (born August 6, 1968) is an American former professional football player who was a running back for the Philadelphia Eagles of the National Football League (NFL). He played college football for the Alabama Crimson Tide and was selected by the Eagles in the second round of the 1992 NFL draft.

== Early career ==
Stacy played at the University of Alabama from 1989 to 1991, after spending two years at Coffeyville Community College in Coffeyville, Kansas. For the Crimson Tide, he was a two-year starter and two-time All-SEC performer.

During his time at Alabama, Stacy rushed for 2,113 yards and 27 touchdowns. He also had 62 receptions for 574 yards for one touchdown.

== Professional career ==
Stacy was drafted in the second round of the 1992 NFL draft by the Philadelphia Eagles as the 48th overall pick. After only playing one game in his rookie season, Stacy was released at the end of the season.

In 1993, he tried out for the Cleveland Browns; however, he did not get a chance to join the team after being arrested for theft at a Kmart. He would later plead guilty to disorderly conduct. His off-the-field troubles would hinder his playing career in the NFL.

Stacy also played for Saskatchewan Roughriders in the Canadian Football League and the Scottish Claymores in NFL Europe. With the latter, he would become the team's all-time leading rusher with 2,350 yards.

== Personal life ==
Stacy's first name was inspired by Saran Wrap, though it is spelled differently.

On November 19, 2007, Stacy and his family were involved in a car accident in which six people were killed. Four of Stacy's children were killed in the accident, as well as his wife and the driver of the other car. Though severely injured, Stacy and one daughter survived the wreck. On November 29, 2008, Stacy was the honorary captain of the 2008 Iron Bowl between Alabama and Auburn. In 2013, he married Jeannie Marie.
