= Alabama State Route 301 =

Highway in Alabama

State Route 301

Route information
- Maintained by ALDOT
- Length: 0.428 mi (689 m)
- Existed: 2016–present

Major junctions
- South end: I-20 / US 431 near Oxford
- North end: US 78 in DeArmanville

Location
- Country: United States
- State: Alabama
- Counties: Calhoun

Highway system
- Alabama State Highway System; Interstate; US; State
← SR 300	→ SR 302

State Route 301 (SR 301) is a north–south route located entirely in Calhoun County in east-central Alabama. The route is 0.428 miles (0.689 km) long.

== Route description ==
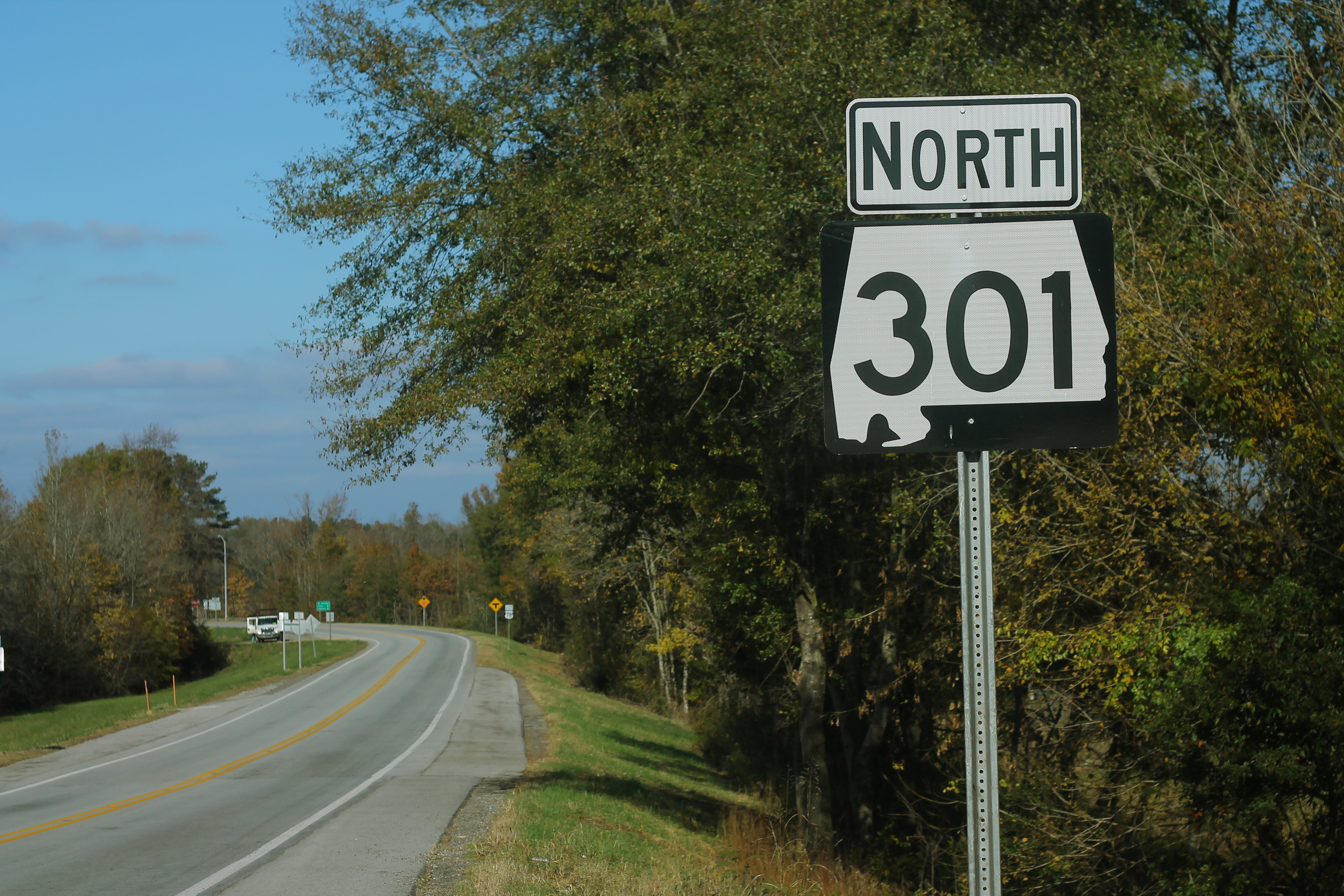
A sign denoting northbound Alabama State Route 301.

SR 301 is a former alignment of U.S. Route 431 (US 431) in the Oxford area. It begins at a junction with US 78 on the north side, and it ends at a junction with Interstate 20 (I-20) and US 431 at exit 191.

== History ==
The SR 301 designation was established in February 2016 when US 431 was re-routed onto I-20 after the completion of the Anniston Eastern Bypass. US 431 followed a concurrency with US 78, but this short link road between the two U.S. Highways became known as SR 301.

== Major intersections ==
The entire route is in DeArmanville, Calhoun County.

mi	km	Destinations	Notes
0.00	0.00	I-20 / US 431 (SR 1) – Birmingham, Atlanta, Wedowee	Southern terminus; I-20 exit 191; road continues south as US 431 (SR 1)
0.428	0.689	US 78 (SR 4) – Heflin, Oxford	Northern terminus
1.000 mi = 1.609 km; 1.000 km = 0.621 mi
