= Keyton, Alabama =

Unincorporated community in Alabama, United States

- Unincorporated community
- Location within Alabama Location within the United States
- Coordinates: 31°16′58″N 85°49′32″W
- Country: United States
- State: Alabama
- County: Coffee
- Elevation: 348 ft (106 m)
- Time zone: UTC-6 (Central (CST))
  - Summer (DST): UTC-5 (CDT)
- Area code: 334
- GNIS feature ID: 121181

Keyton is an unincorporated community in Coffee County, Alabama, United States. Keyton is located along Alabama State Route 167, 2.4 miles (3.9 km) southeast of downtown Enterprise. Most of Keyton lies within the Enterprise city limits.

== History ==
A post office operated under the name Keyton from 1892 to 1903.
