= Charlie Monk (broadcaster) =

American music industry executive

- Born: Charles Franklin Monk; October 29, 1938; Geneva, Alabama, U.S.
- Died: December 19, 2022 (aged 84); Nashville, Tennessee, U.S.
- Occupations: Disc jockey; Song publisher; Songwriter; Record producer
- Years active: 1968-1993, 2004-2022
- Spouse: Royce Walton
- Children: 4

Charles Franklin Monk (October 29, 1938 – December 19, 2022) was an American music industry executive. Known as the "Mayor of Music Row", he held various careers in the field of country music in and around Nashville, Tennessee.

== Biography ==
Charles Franklin Monk was born October 29, 1938, in Geneva, Alabama. His parents separated shortly before his birth, and he was raised by his mother in a house that had no electricity or running water. The family would listen to music on a battery-powered radio. Monk's first job was putting up promotional flyers for a local movie theater. As a teenager, he got a job sweeping floors at WGEA in his hometown, which led to him becoming a nighttime disc jockey at that station. Monk joined the United States Army; after leaving, he attended Troy University and worked at WTBF. After dropping out of Troy University, he moved to University of Alabama in Tuscaloosa, Alabama, where he worked at WACT. He worked at both that station and WUNI (now WNGL) in Mobile, Alabama, as a program director. Through these roles, Monk was selected to become a guest announcer on the Grand Ole Opry, a country music radio show hosted by WSM in Nashville, Tennessee. Because of his role at WSM, he moved to Nashville in 1968.

In 1969, Monk began broadcasting his own show for WMTS (now WMGC) in Murfreesboro, Tennessee. During weekdays, he would host informal interviews with country music artists.

While in Nashville, Monk also joined the board of the American Society of Composers, Authors and Publishers (ASCAP) and co-founded the Country Radio Seminar, an annual concert held in Nashville by Country Radio Broadcasters to promote new artists to radio broadcasters and music executives. He attended the seminar every year after its inception. Monk also worked as a record producer and songwriter throughout the 1970s and 1980s, which led to him founding his song publishing company Monk Family Music Group in 1983. Monk also co-produced songs for Keith Stegall and Randy Travis, and helped promote the latter to various record labels early in his career. Because of his multiple industry connections within the country music scene, Monk became nicknamed the "Mayor of Music Row".

Although he largely retired after the early 1990s, he returned to radio in 2004. First, he hosted a talk show on WGFX, which led to him joining Sirius Satellite Radio (now known as SiriusXM) a year later. This included a regular position as host on the channel Willie's Roadhouse.

== Personal life ==
Monk married Royce Walton in 1959. The couple had two sons and two daughters. He died on December 19, 2022, at age 84.
