= Alabama State Route 302 =

State highway in Alabama, United States

State Route 302
- West McKinnon Street

Route information
- Maintained by ALDOT
- Length: 2.352 mi (3.785 km)
- Existed: 2016–present

Major junctions
- West end: US 84 near New Brockton
- North end: SR 122 in New Brockton

Location
- Country: United States
- State: Alabama
- Counties: Coffee

Highway system
- Alabama State Highway System; Interstate; US; State
← SR 301	→ SR 303

State Route 302 (SR 302) is an east–west route located entirely in Coffee County in southeastern Alabama. The route is 2.352 miles (3.785 km) long. The entire route goes by the street name West McKinnon Street.

== Route description ==
SR 302 is part of the old alignment of U.S. Route 84 (US 84) in the New Brockton area. It begins at a junction with the new bypass alignment of US 84 on the west side, and it ends at a junction with SR 122 in the town's downtown core. The remaining parts of SR 122 going southeast is also a part of the old US 84 in New Brockton.

== History ==
The SR 302 designation was established in 2016 when US 84 was re-routed onto an alignment that bypasses the town of New Brockton.

== Major intersections ==
The entire route is in Coffee County.

Location	mi	km	Destinations	Notes
	0.000	0.000	US 84 (SR 12) – Enterprise, Elba	Western terminus
New Brockton	2.352	3.785	SR 122 (N John Street/E McKinnon Street)	Eastern terminus; Old US 84 follows SR 122 south (E McKinnon Street)
1.000 mi = 1.609 km; 1.000 km = 0.621 mi
