= Charlie Monk =

Charlie Monk may refer to:

- Charlie Monk (broadcaster) (1938–2022), American radio host and music executive
- Charlie Monk (speedway rider) (born 1940), Australian motorcycle speedway rider
