= Daleville, Alabama =

City in Alabama, United States

Daleville
- City
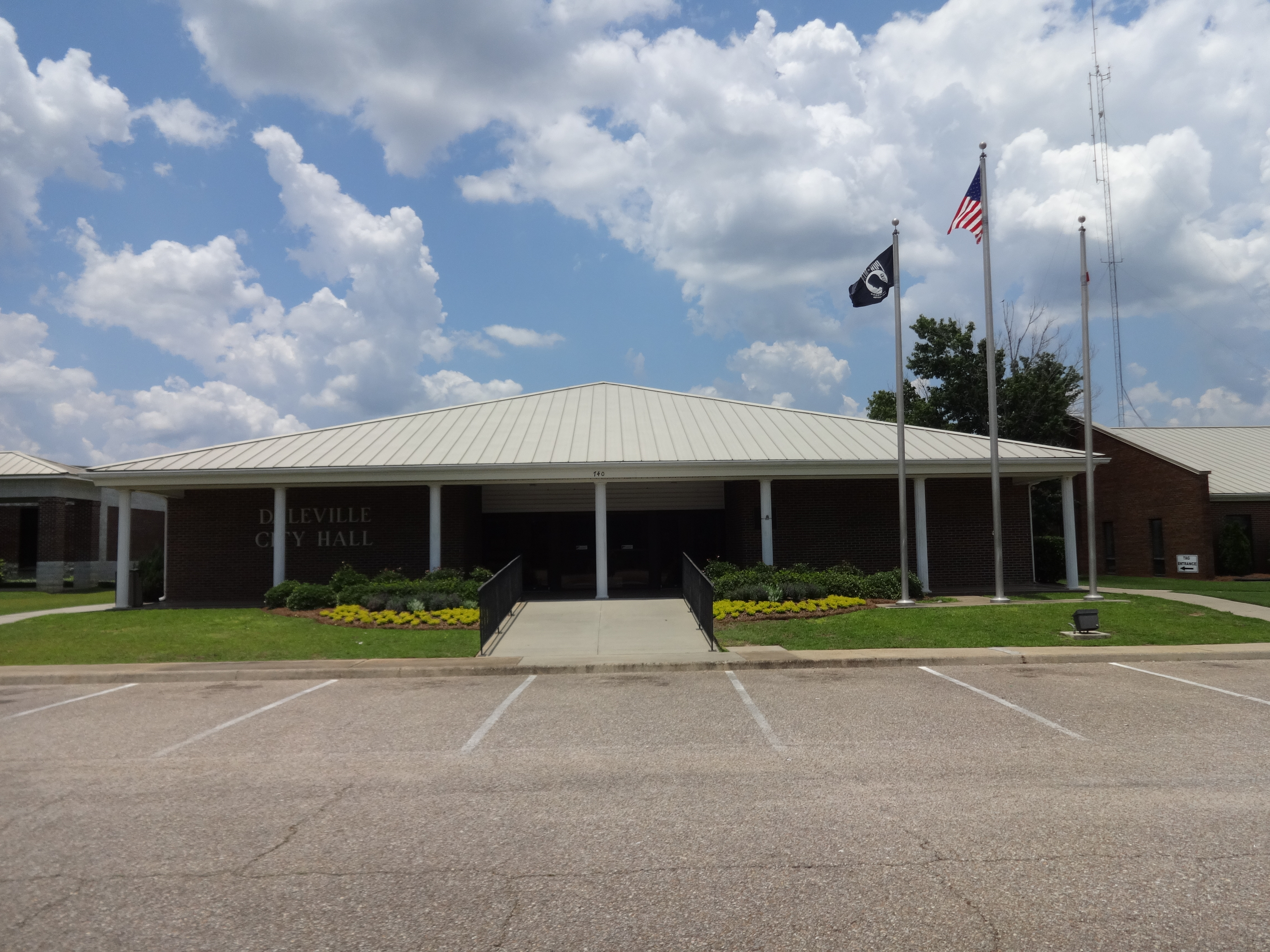
- Daleville City Hall

- Flag Seal
- Nickname: Gateway to Fort Rucker
- Location of Daleville in Dale County, Alabama.
- Coordinates: 31°17′10″N 85°44′00″W
- Country: United States
- State: Alabama
- County: Dale

Area
  - Total: 14.14 sq mi (36.63 km^{2})
  - Land: 14.14 sq mi (36.63 km^{2})
  - Water: 0 sq mi (0.00 km^{2})
- Elevation: 315 ft (96 m)

Population (2020)
  - Total: 4,866
  - Density: 344.1/sq mi (132.84/km^{2})
- Time zone: UTC-6 (Central (CST))
  - Summer (DST): UTC-5 (CDT)
- ZIP code: 36322
- Area code: 334
- FIPS code: 01-19360
- GNIS feature ID: 2404178
- Website: dalevilleal.com

Daleville is a city in Dale County, Alabama, United States. As of the 2020 census, Daleville had a population of 4,866. It is part of the Ozark Micropolitan Statistical Area. The city's nickname is "Gateway to Fort Rucker", as this U.S. Army post is located just north of town. Cairns Army Airfield is located to the south of Daleville on the road to nearby Clayhatchee.

== History ==
Daleville, originally known as "Dale's Court House", was founded in 1827 by veterans of the Creek Indian War who had settled in Dale County following that conflict. It was established as the original county seat of Dale County in 1827 but lost that honor when Coffee County split from Dale in 1841, at which time the seat was moved first to Newton, and then later to Ozark in 1870, where it remains today.

The name of Daleville was adopted in 1848. Daleville voted to incorporate in 1912, but rescinded it in 1916. It later voted for incorporation in 1958.

Residents of the town formed portions of two regiments of the Confederate States Army during the U.S. Civil War: the 15th Alabama Infantry, famed for charging the 20th Maine on Little Round Top during the Battle of Gettysburg, and the 33rd Alabama Infantry. In the latter regiment, Company "G", called the "Daleville Blues", was recruited entirely from Daleville. Several men from this company were killed in a freak train derailment on November 4, 1862, near Cleveland, Tennessee; the remainder would fight with the rest of the 33rd in the Confederate Army of Tennessee until the final surrender in 1865.

Long a tiny farming community, Daleville saw significant expansion during the mid-to-late twentieth century with the establishment and enlargement of Fort Rucker, the U.S. Army's primary aviation training post. Douglas Brown, a former mayor of Ozark, teamed up with two Georgia businessmen, L.C. Hall and Bob Culpepper, to develop the city. Securing a 1.5 million dollar loan, the trio purchased 400 acres (1.6 km^{2}) of land in Daleville, constructed a lagoon sewer system and began to build the town house by house, shopping center by shopping center. Numerous military personnel then made their homes in the community, and many elected to stay after their retirement or otherwise completing their service obligation. This large military presence gives the town a more cosmopolitan populace than other area towns farther away from the base.

Daleville was the victim of an F1 tornado on November 24, 2001, part of the Arkansas-Mississippi-Alabama tornado outbreak that occurred on November 23 and 24 of that year. Two restaurants and two industrial buildings were destroyed; a local lounge suffered severe damage as well. Also damaged were maintenance buildings, one aircraft, 25 businesses, a church, gas station, two supermarkets, a bank and several homes. 25 people inside the lounge were injured, but no fatalities were reported.

== Geography ==
Daleville is located in southwestern Dale County. U.S. Highway 84 passes through the southern part of the city, leading east 21 miles (34 km) to Dothan and west 10 miles (16 km) to Enterprise. Daleville is the northern terminus of Alabama State Route 85, which runs south from the city 23 miles (37 km) to Geneva. This route intersects with US 84 on the south side of town. Alabama State Route 134 runs east from Daleville 7 miles (11 km) toward Newton; westbound 134 joins U.S. 84 to continue on to Enterprise.

According to the U.S. Census Bureau, Daleville has a total area of 14.1 square miles (36.5 km^{2}), all land. The Choctawhatchee River flows a few miles east of the city.

== Demographics ==
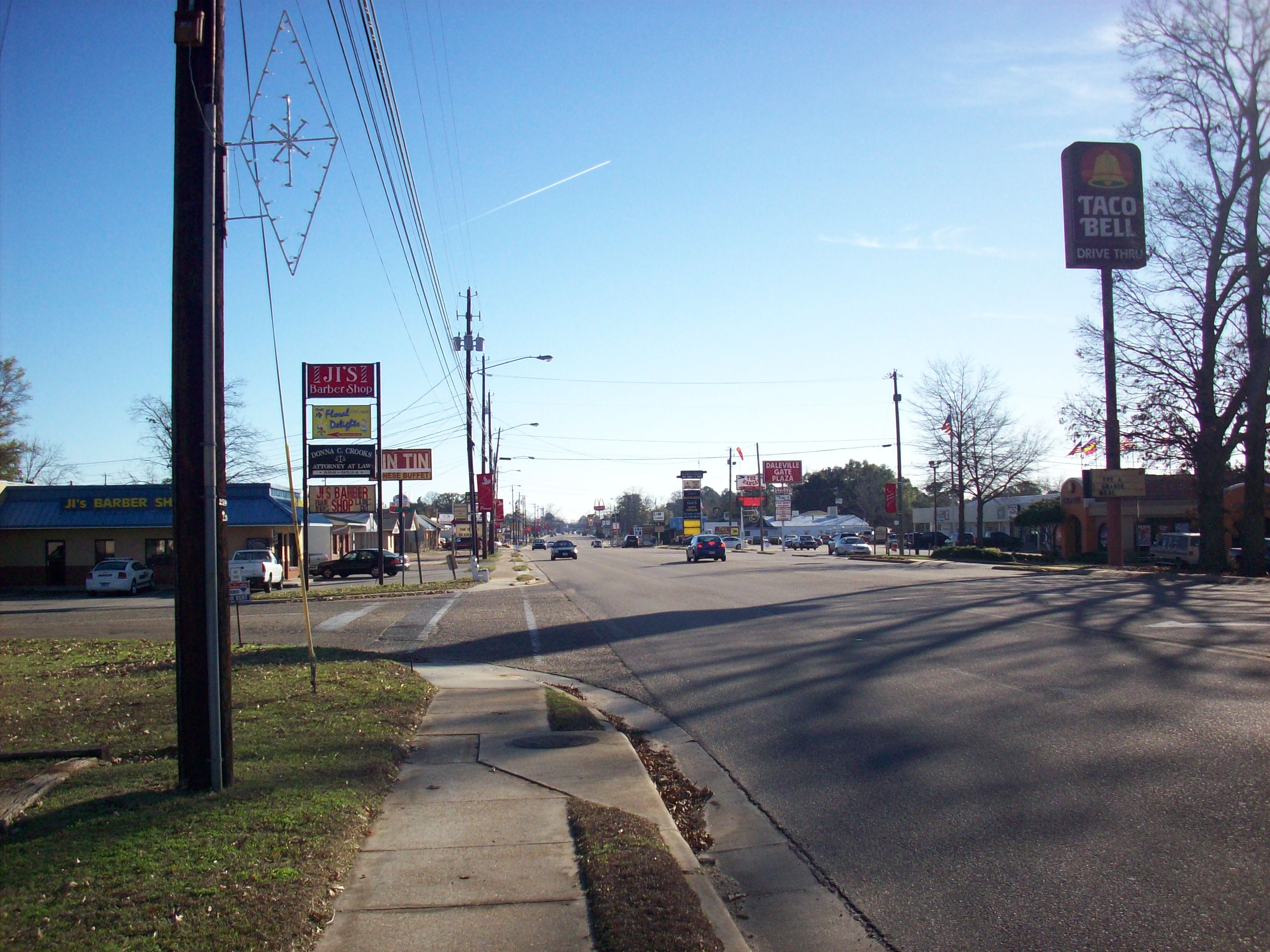
Daleville Avenue, Daleville's main thoroughfare

Historical population
Census	Pop.	Note	%±
1960	693		—
1970	5,182		647.8%
1980	4,206		−18.8%
1990	5,117		21.7%
2000	4,653		−9.1%
2010	5,295		13.8%
2020	4,866		−8.1%
U.S. Decennial Census; 2013 Estimate

=== Racial and ethnic composition ===
Daleville city, Alabama – Racial and ethnic composition Note: the US Census treats Hispanic/Latino as an ethnic category. This table excludes Latinos from the racial categories and assigns them to a separate category. Hispanics/Latinos may be of any race.
Race / Ethnicity (NH = Non-Hispanic)	Pop 1980	Pop 1990	Pop 2000	Pop 2010	Pop 2020	% 1980	% 1990	% 2000	% 2010	% 2020
White alone (NH)	3,214	3,811	2,929	3,185	2,663	76.41%	74.48%	62.95%	60.15%	54.73%
Black or African American alone (NH)	613	871	1,171	1,171	1,108	14.57%	17.02%	25.17%	22.12%	22.77%
Native American or Alaska Native alone (NH)	38	18	35	49	22	0.90%	0.35%	0.75%	0.93%	0.45%
Asian alone (NH)	174	240	168	143	152	4.14%	4.69%	3.61%	2.70%	3.12%
Native Hawaiian or Pacific Islander alone (NH)	x	x	10	9	0	x	x	0.21%	0.17%	0.00%
Other race alone (NH)	0	1	12	10	33	0.00%	0.02%	0.26%	0.19%	0.68%
Mixed race or Multiracial (NH)	x	x	145	193	325	x	x	3.12%	3.64%	6.68%
Hispanic or Latino (any race)	167	176	183	535	563	3.97%	3.44%	3.93%	10.10%	11.57%
Total	4,206	5,117	4,653	5,295	4,866	100.00%	100.00%	100.00%	100.00%	100.00%

=== 2020 census ===
As of the 2020 census, Daleville had a population of 4,866, with 2,212 households and 1,203 families. The median age was 38.3 years. 21.9% of residents were under the age of 18 and 15.8% of residents were 65 years of age or older. For every 100 females there were 94.6 males, and for every 100 females age 18 and over there were 94.7 males age 18 and over.

69.8% of residents lived in urban areas, while 30.2% lived in rural areas.

There were 2,212 households in Daleville, of which 26.6% had children under the age of 18 living in them. Of all households, 33.0% were married-couple households, 26.9% were households with a male householder and no spouse or partner present, and 33.0% were households with a female householder and no spouse or partner present. About 37.8% of all households were made up of individuals and 11.4% had someone living alone who was 65 years of age or older.

There were 2,657 housing units, of which 16.7% were vacant. The homeowner vacancy rate was 4.0% and the rental vacancy rate was 16.6%.

=== 2010 census ===
As of the census of 2010, there were 5,295 people, 2,384 households, and 1,353 families residing in the city. The population density was 344.7 inhabitants per square mile (133.1/km^{2}). There were 2,795 housing units at an average density of 207.0 per square mile (79.9/km^{2}). The racial makeup of the city was 66.2% White, 22.6% Black or African American, 1.1% Native American, 2.7% Asian, 0.2% Pacific Islander, 2.9% from other races, and 4.3% from two or more races. 10.1% of the population were Hispanic or Latino of any race.

There were 2,384 households, out of which 25.1% had children under the age of 18 living with them, 36.0% were married couples living together, 15.4% had a female householder with no husband present, and 43.2% were non-families. 37.2% of all households were made up of individuals, and 8.8% had someone living alone who was 65 years of age or older. The average household size was 2.22 and the average family size was 2.92.

In the city, the population was spread out, with 23.9% under the age of 18, 9.6% from 18 to 24, 28.6% from 25 to 44, 26.5% from 45 to 64, and 11.4% who were 65 years of age or older. The median age was 35.0 years. For every 100 females, there were 103.3 males. For every 100 females aged 18 and over, there were 110.4 males.

The median income for a household in the city was $47,536, and the median income for a family was $48,824. Males had a median income of $47,588 versus $30,167 for females. The per capita income for the city was $23,663. About 11.1% of families and 13.8% of the population were below the poverty line, including 19.7% of those under age 18 and 12.9% of those age 65 or over.

=== 2000 census ===
As of the census of 2000, there were 4,653 people, 1,980 households, and 1,245 families residing in the city. The population density was 344.5 inhabitants per square mile (133.0/km^{2}). There were 2,541 housing units at an average density of 188.1 per square mile (72.6/km^{2}). The racial makeup of the city was 64.20% White, 25.36% Black or African American, 0.75% Native American, 3.65% Asian, 0.21% Pacific Islander, 2.19% from other races, and 3.63% from two or more races. 3.93% of the population were Hispanic or Latino of any race.

There were 1,980 households, out of which 31.7% had children under the age of 18 living with them, 44.2% were married couples living together, 14.8% had a female householder with no husband present, and 37.1% were non-families. 31.5% of all households were made up of individuals, and 8.2% had someone living alone who was 65 years of age or older. The average household size was 2.35 and the average family size was 2.96.

In the city, the population was spread out, with 26.3% under the age of 18, 10.3% from 18 to 24, 30.2% from 25 to 44, 23.4% from 45 to 64, and 9.8% who were 65 years of age or older. The median age was 34 years. For every 100 females, there were 97.9 males. For every 100 females aged 18 and over, there were 94.4 males.

The median income for a household in the city was $34,473, and the median income for a family was $40,994. Males had a median income of $30,997 versus $21,162 for females. The per capita income for the city was $16,761. About 11.5% of families and 13.8% of the population were below the poverty line, including 14.6% of those under age 18 and 14.3% of those age 65 or over.

== Government ==
Daleville is governed by a mayor and a city council of five members. The mayor in 2020 is Jayme Stayton, serving his second term. The city council in 2020 is Kevin Turley, Jo Reese, Katheryne Horace, Jimmy Monk, Sr, and Alan Souders. The city is located in Alabama's Second Congressional District; its current representative (as of 2021) is Barry Moore (R). The city is split between two state senate districts (29 and 31) and three state house districts (87, 91 and 93).

Utilities are provided through Alabama Power and the Pea River Co-op (Electricity), the city water department (water), Southeast Alabama Gas District (natural gas), CenturyLink (telephone/internet/video), Time Warner Cable (telephone/internet/video) and Troy Cable (telephone/internet/video).

Daleville is protected by a full-time police department with seventeen officers, a volunteer fire department, and an advanced life support ambulance service/rescue squad. All three are provided by the Daleville Department of Public Safety led by Director John Crawford. The city also offers a community center, senior center, public library and convention center.

== Schools ==
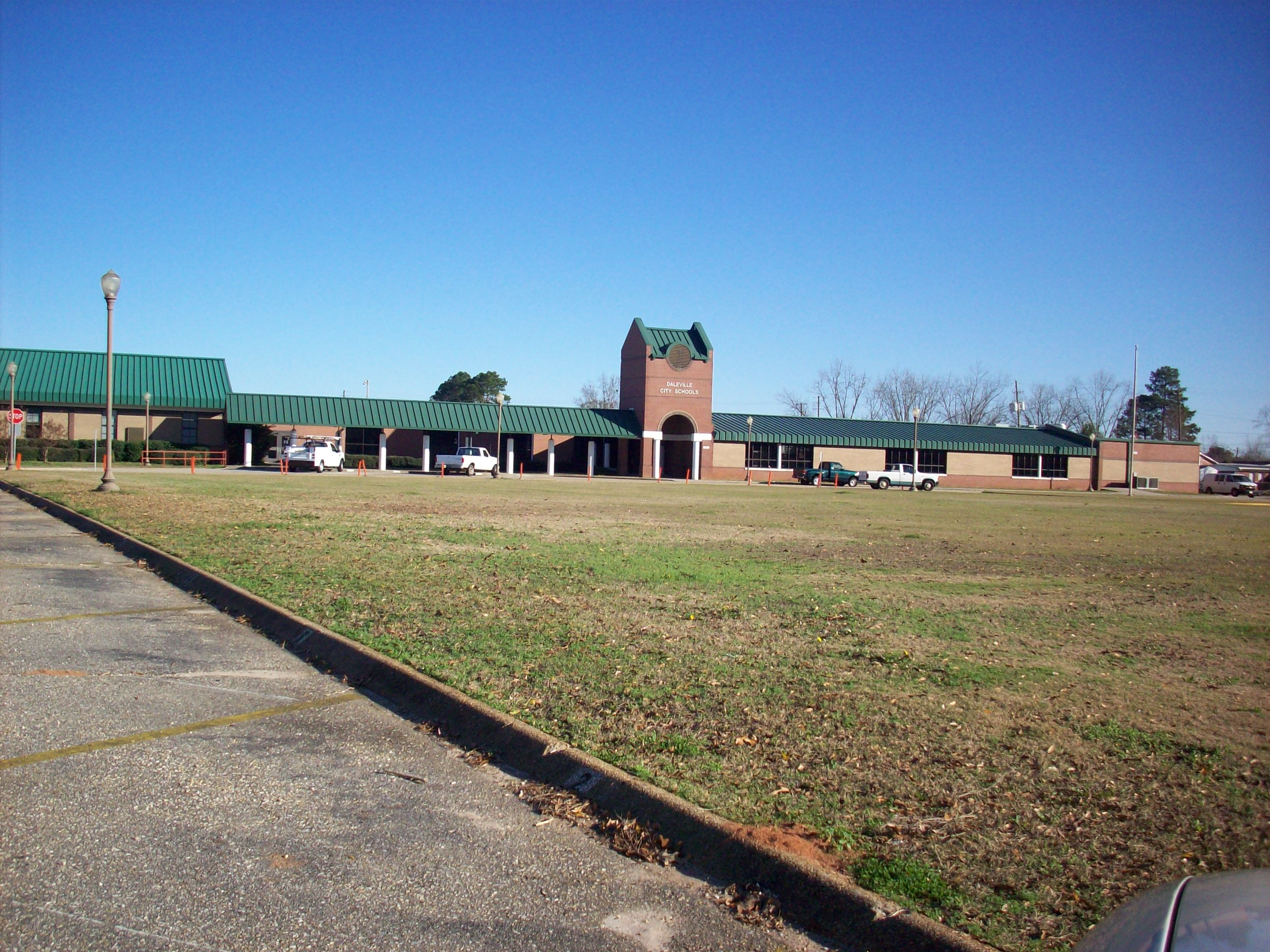
Daleville High School

Daleville is served by one elementary and one high school, which together make up the self-contained Daleville School District. Windham Elementary School serves grades K-6, while Daleville High School serves grades 7–12. The high school's JROTC program has held the rating of "Honor Unit With Distinction", the highest possible unit ranking within the JROTC program, for the past 33 consecutive years (as of 2007). Its rifle team has won seventeen state championships and numerous local competitions. The high school football team was the winner of the 1992 4A football championship, and was runner-up in 1993. In 1997, the high school basketball team reached the state's final four tournament.

== Notable people ==
- Mickey Andrews, college football coach
- Ethel Cain, singer-songwriter
- Margaret Peterlin, Chief of Staff to the United States Secretary of State, February 2017–March 2018
- Jonas Randolph, American football player
- Tony Richardson, NFL player
- Robert W. Smith, composer
- Shawn Stuckey, NFL player and attorney
- Jalen White, NFL player
- Brandon Burks, NFL player
