= Rawls Hotel =

Historic building in Enterprise, Alabama

- U.S. National Register of Historic Places
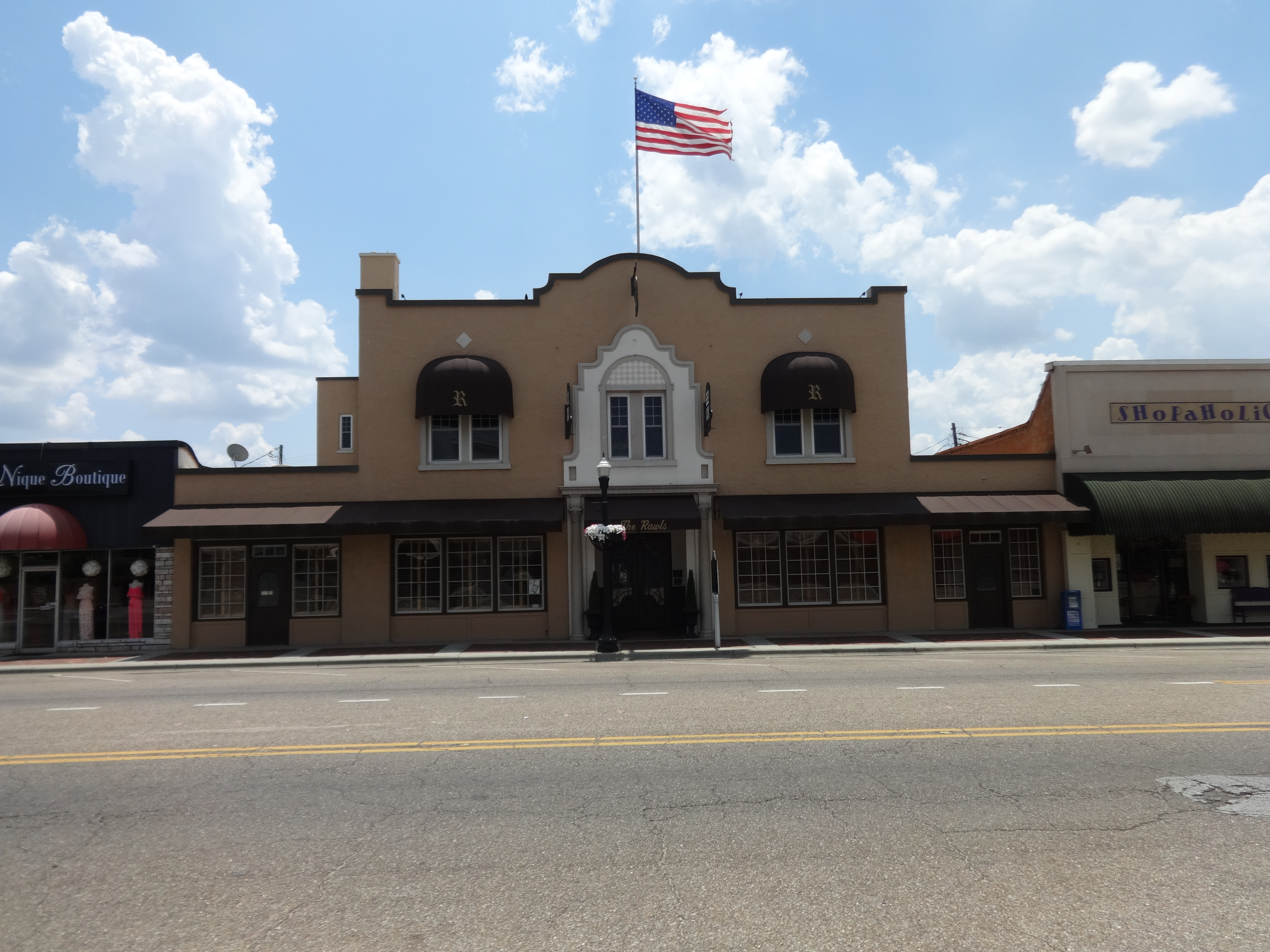

- Location within Alabama
- Location: 116 S. Main St., Enterprise, Alabama
- Coordinates: 31°18′16″N 85°51′15″W
- Area: 0.7 acres (0.28 ha)
- Built: 1903, 1928
- Built by: John D.C. McKinnon
- Architectural style: Mission/spanish Revival
- NRHP reference No.: 80000684
- Added to NRHP: September 17, 1980

Rawls Hotel, at 116 S. Main Street in Enterprise, Alabama, United States, was built in 1903 and was expanded in 1923. It was listed on the National Register of Historic Places in 1980.

It is a brick building, with the brick being load-bearing, and is stucco-faced, in Spanish Mission style. It was built by contractor John D.C. McKinnon. The 1903 section, fronting on Main Street, is 76 by 61 feet (23 m × 19 m) in plan, and has two one-story storefronts and a two-story pavilion containing them plus a central hallway leading to the hotel lobby. The 1928 section is a three-story, U-shaped 100-by-95-foot (30 m × 29 m) portion facing Railroad Street and the train depot. The original section was altered somewhat in the 1928 renovation. It has a "raised, stepped, curvilinear parapet with cement coping painted a rich brown" hiding its flat roof.

The building was deemed significant "as one of the most elaborate buildings in Coffee County. Constructed by Japenth Rawls about 1903 and remodeled and enlarged by his nephew, Jesse P. Rawls, in [1928], it is located across from the train station (NRHP 8-7-74) and has served as a landmark and central meeting place for the citizens of Enterprise. The building is also significant for its associations with the Rawls -- a family which was important in the early growth and prosperity of the city. The elder Rawls was involved in the development of the turpentine industry in Coffee County, while his nephew built and financed the first electric system in Enterprise and operated one of the largest and oldest mills in the city. It was, however, the railroad, whose station the hotel served, that gave the town its major economic stimulus."
