= Frisco, Alabama =

Unincorporated community in Alabama, United States

- Unincorporated community
- Location within Alabama Location within the United States
- Coordinates: 31°35′44″N 85°51′56″W
- Country: United States
- State: Alabama
- County: Coffee
- Elevation: 394 ft (120 m)
- Time zone: UTC-6 (Central (CST))
  - Summer (DST): UTC-5 (CDT)
- Area code: 334
- GNIS feature ID: 156384

Frisco, also spelled Fresco, is an unincorporated community in Coffee County, Alabama, United States.

== History ==
A post office operated under the name Fresco from 1887 to 1904.
