= Jack, Alabama =

Unincorporated community in Alabama, United States

- Unincorporated community
- Location within Alabama Location within the United States
- Coordinates: 31°34′27″N 86°00′01″W
- Country: United States
- State: Alabama
- County: Coffee
- Elevation: 390 ft (119 m)
- Time zone: UTC-6 (Central (CST))
  - Summer (DST): UTC-5 (CDT)
- ZIP code: 36346
- Area code: 334
- GNIS feature ID: 156519

Jack is an unincorporated community in Coffee County, Alabama, United States. Jack is located on Alabama State Route 87, 11.7 miles (18.8 km) north-northeast of Elba. Jack has a post office with ZIP code 36346. Jack has a single K-12 school, Zion Chapel. There are 1,379 residents in Jack, with a median age of 44.9. Of this, 46.56% are males and 53.44% are females.
