= Victoria, Alabama =

Unincorporated community in Alabama, United States

- Unincorporated community
- Location within Alabama Location within the United States
- Coordinates: 31°31′48″N 85°56′18″W
- Country: United States
- State: Alabama
- County: Coffee
- Elevation: 492 ft (150 m)
- Time zone: UTC-6 (Central (CST))
  - Summer (DST): UTC-5 (CDT)
- Area code: 334
- GNIS feature ID: 153842

Victoria, also known as Smut Eye or Buzbeeville, is an unincorporated community in Coffee County, Alabama, United States. Victoria is located along Alabama State Route 125, 10.8 miles (17.4 km) northeast of Elba.

== History ==
The community was originally known as Smut Eye, as tradition states the local men would stand around a fire outside the local store and become covered in soot. Later, the name was changed to Buzbeeville in honor of William Buzbee, who served as postmaster. Finally, the name was changed to Victoria, in honor of Victoria Winslow, a local citizen. A post office operated under the name Smut Eye from 1850 to 1853, under the name Buzbeeville from 1853 to 1868, and under the name Victoria from 1868 to 1927.

Company D of the 12th Regiment Alabama Infantry, (known as the "Coffee County Rangers"), was organized by John Canty Brown of Buzbeeville. The regiment fought at the First Battle of Bull Run, the Battle of Antietam, and the Battle of Gettysburg, among other battles. The regiment surrendered after the Battle of Appomattox Court House.
