= Goodman, Alabama =

Unincorporated community in Alabama, United States

- Unincorporated community
- Location within Alabama Location within the United States
- Coordinates: 31°16′47″N 85°59′37″W
- Country: United States
- State: Alabama
- County: Coffee
- Elevation: 351 ft (107 m)
- Time zone: UTC-6 (Central (CST))
  - Summer (DST): UTC-5 (CDT)
- ZIP code: ZIP code 36351
- Area code: 334
- GNIS feature ID: 119143

Goodman is an unincorporated community in Coffee County, Alabama, United States, located 8.5 miles (13.7 km) west-southwest of Enterprise. As of 2007, its population was 2,453.
