= Brandon Burks =

American football player (born 1993)

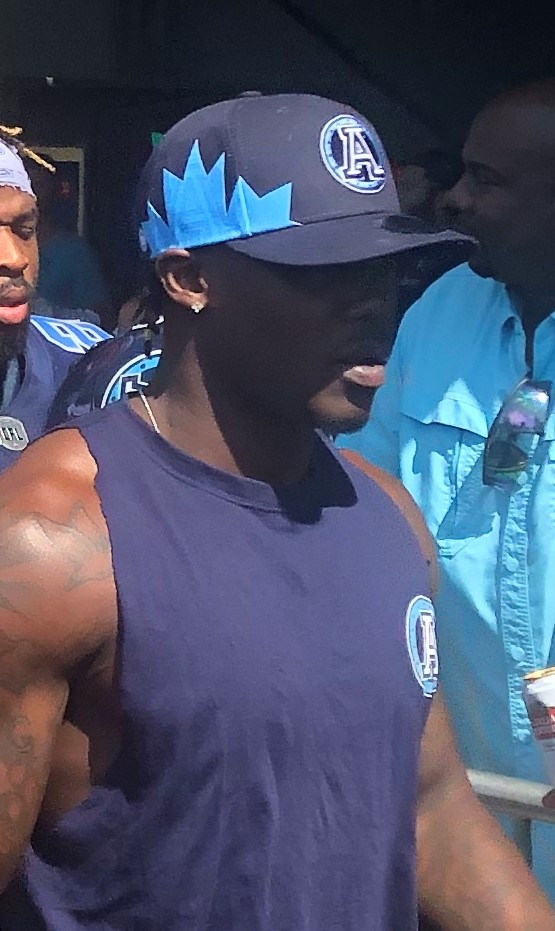

Profile
- Position: Running back

Personal information
- Born: November 1, 1993 (age 33); Enterprise, Alabama
- Listed height: 5 ft 9 in (1.75 m)
- Listed weight: 208 lb (94 kg)

Career information
- High school: Daleville (AL)
- College: Troy
- NFL draft: 2016: undrafted

Career history
- Green Bay Packers (2016)*; New York Jets (2016); Toronto Argonauts (2018–2019); Edmonton Eskimos (2020)
- * Offseason or practice squad member only

Career NFL statistics
- Rushing attempts: 2
- Rushing yards: −4
- Rushing touchdowns: 0
- Stats at Pro Football Reference
- Stats at CFL.ca

Brandon Barnard Burks (born November 1, 1993) is an American gridiron football running back. He played college football at Troy. Burks was signed by the Green Bay Packers as an undrafted free agent in 2016.

== College career ==
Burks attended Troy, where he played college football for the Trojans.

== Professional career ==
Pre-draft measurables
Height	Weight	40-yard dash	10-yard split	20-yard split	20-yard shuttle	Three-cone drill	Vertical jump	Broad jump	Bench press	Wonderlic
5 ft 9 in (1.75 m)	208 lb (94 kg)	4.56 s	1.52 s	2.63 s	4.18 s	6.88 s	37 in (0.94 m)	10 ft 0 in (3.05 m)	24 reps	18
All values are from Pro Day

=== Green Bay Packers ===
After going undrafted in the 2016 NFL draft, Burks signed with the Green Bay Packers on May 9, 2016. On September 5, 2016, he was released by the Packers after initially making the 53-man roster the day before. Burks was signed to the Packers' practice squad on November 2, 2016. On November 11, 2016, he was released from the Packers' practice squad.

=== New York Jets ===
On December 14, 2016, Burks was signed to the Jets' practice squad. He was promoted to the active roster on December 28, 2016. On April 26, 2017, Burks was waived by the Jets.

=== Toronto Argonauts ===
In April 2018, Burks participated in The Spring League, a developmental league to highlight players in front of NFL and CFL scouts. Burks was the first player signed to a professional team when he agreed to terms with the Toronto Argonauts of the CFL on April 16. Burks made a splash during the preseason, recreating a Spring League play against the Hamilton Tiger-Cats where he reversed direction numerous times to avoid tackles for a loss before streaking for a large gain. In the two preseason games, Burks had 13 carries for 69 yards, as well as two catches for 42 yards and a score. As a result, Burks was assigned to the practice roster after the preseason, but was promoted to the active roster for the team's week 4 game against Edmonton. He was also called up in weeks 6 and 15, handling reserve running back and returner duties in all three games, before being demoted back to the practice roster. Following a season ending injury to starting running back James Wilder Jr., and the trade of backup Martese Jackson, Burks assumed the starting role as the Argos limped to a last place finish to the season. In eight games played, Burks produced 283 yards on 45 carries, 125 yards and a touchdown on 18 receptions, and 72 yards on four kick returns. He was released by the Argonauts on February 3, 2020.

=== Edmonton Eskimos ===
Burks signed with the Edmonton Eskimos on February 11, 2020.
