= Central City, Alabama =

Unincorporated community in Alabama, United States

- Unincorporated community
- Location within Alabama Location within the United States
- Coordinates: 31°14′36″N 85°53′06″W
- Country: United States
- State: Alabama
- County: Coffee
- Elevation: 315 ft (96 m)
- Time zone: UTC-6 (Central (CST))
  - Summer (DST): UTC-5 (CDT)
- Area code: 334
- GNIS feature ID: 154446

Central City, also known as Eta, is an unincorporated community in Coffee County, Alabama, United States. Central City is located along Alabama State Route 27, 5.2 miles (8.4 km) south-southwest of Enterprise.

== History ==
The community is likely named for its location. A post office operated under the name Eta from 1894 to 1903.
