= Roeton, Alabama =

Unincorporated community in Alabama, United States

- Unincorporated community
- Location within Alabama Location within the United States
- Coordinates: 31°35′52″N 85°50′05″W
- Country: United States
- State: Alabama
- County: Coffee
- Elevation: 400 ft (120 m)
- Time zone: UTC-6 (Central (CST))
  - Summer (DST): UTC-5 (CDT)
- Area code: 334
- GNIS feature ID: 125899

Roeton is an unincorporated community in Coffee County, Alabama, United States.

== History ==
The community is likely named after a local family. A post office operated under the name Roeton from 1901 to 1905.
