= Damascus, Coffee County, Alabama =

Unincorporated community in Alabama, United States

Damascus, Alabama
- Unincorporated community
- Location within Alabama Location within the United States
- Coordinates: 31°19′14″N 86°00′16″W
- Country: United States
- State: Alabama
- County: Coffee
- Elevation: 358 ft (109 m)
- Time zone: UTC-6 (Central (CST))
  - Summer (DST): UTC-5 (CDT)
- Area code: 334
- GNIS feature ID: 117029

Damascus is an unincorporated community in Coffee County, Alabama, United States.

== History ==
A post office operated under the name Damascus from 1885 to 1907.
