= Richburg, Alabama =

Unincorporated community in Alabama, United States

- Unincorporated community
- Location in Alabama and the United States Richburg (the United States)
- Coordinates: 31°23′49″N 85°57′39″W
- Country: United States
- State: Alabama
- County: Coffee
- Elevation: 417 ft (127 m)
- Time zone: UTC-6 (Central (CST))
  - Summer (DST): UTC-5 (CDT)
- Area code: 334
- GNIS feature ID: 156964

Richburg is an unincorporated community in Coffee County, Alabama, United States. Richburg is located along U.S. Route 84, 2.0 miles (3.2 km) west-northwest of New Brockton.

== History ==
A post office operated under the name Richburg from 1900 to 1913.
