= Brooklyn, Coffee County, Alabama =

Unincorporated community in Alabama, United States

Brooklyn, Alabama
- Unincorporated community
- Location within Alabama Location within the United States
- Coordinates: 31°18′47″N 86°10′16″W
- Country: United States
- State: Alabama
- County: Coffee
- Elevation: 308 ft (94 m)
- Time zone: UTC-6 (Central (CST))
  - Summer (DST): UTC-5 (CDT)
- Area code: 334
- GNIS feature ID: 114957

Brooklyn is an unincorporated community in Coffee County, Alabama, United States, located 5.4 miles (8.7 km) east-northeast of Opp.
