= Alabama State Route 85 =

State highway in Alabama, United States

State Route 85

Route information
- Maintained by ALDOT
- Length: 22.316 mi (35.914 km)
- Existed: 1940–present

Major junctions
- South end: SR 27 in Geneva
- SR 167 in southwestern Dale County; US 84 in Daleville
- North end: Fort Novosel, near Daleville

Location
- Country: United States
- State: Alabama
- Counties: Geneva, Dale

Highway system
- Alabama State Highway System; Interstate; US; State
← I-85	→ SR 86

State Route 85 (SR 85) is a 22.316-mile-long (35.914 km) state highway in the southeastern part of the U.S. state of Alabama. The southern terminus of the highway is at an intersection with SR 27 in Geneva. The highway continues to its northern terminus at an entrance to Fort Novosel near Daleville.

== Route description ==
SR 85 heads northeasterly from its southern terminus in Geneva. The highway travels through rural areas of Geneva County, then crosses into the southwestern corner of Dale County. Near Clayhatchee, the highway briefly turns eastward as it begins a brief concurrency with SR 92. The highway turns northward at the end of the concurrency, then continues through Daleville, where it crosses U.S. Route 84 (US 84) then reaches its northern terminus at a gate on the south side of Fort Novosel.

== Major intersections ==
County	Location	mi	km	Destinations	Notes
Geneva	Geneva	0.000	0.000	SR 27 – Geneva, Enterprise	Southern terminus
Dale		12.299	19.793	SR 167 – Enterprise, Hartford	
Dale		15.208	24.475	SR 92 west – Enterprise	Southern end of SR 92 concurrency
Dale	Clayhatchee	15.945	25.661	SR 92 east – Dothan	Northern end of SR 92 concurrency
Dale	Daleville	20.375	32.790	US 84 / SR 134 west (SR 12) – Enterprise, Dothan	Southern end of SR 134 concurrency
Dale	Daleville	21.225	34.158	SR 134 east – Newton, Fort Novosel Truck Route Newton Gate	Northern end of SR 134 concurrency
Dale	Daleville	22.316	35.914	Fort Novosel (Daleville Gate)	Northern terminus
1.000 mi = 1.609 km; 1.000 km = 0.621 mi: Concurrency terminus
