= Battens Crossroads, Alabama =

Unincorporated community in Alabama, United States

- Unincorporated community
- Location within Alabama Location within the United States
- Coordinates: 31°15′40″N 85°53′24″W
- Country: United States
- State: Alabama
- County: Coffee
- Elevation: 344 ft (105 m)
- Time zone: UTC-6 (Central (CST))
  - Summer (DST): UTC-5 (CDT)
- Area code: 334
- GNIS feature ID: 113572

Battens Crossroads, also known as Union Academy, is an unincorporated community in Coffee County, Alabama, United States. Battens Crossroads is located along Alabama State Route 27, 13.9 miles (22.4 km) southeast of Elba.

== History ==
The community is named after the Batten family, who lived in the area.
