= Bellwood, Alabama =

Unincorporated community in Alabama, United States

- Unincorporated community
- Location within Alabama Location within the United States
- Coordinates: 31°10′24″N 85°47′36″W
- Country: United States
- State: Alabama
- County: Geneva
- Elevation: 135 ft (41 m)
- Time zone: UTC-6 (Central (CST))
  - Summer (DST): UTC-5 (CDT)
- ZIP code: 36313
- Area code: 334
- GNIS feature ID: 113896

Bellwood is an unincorporated community in Geneva County, Alabama, United States. Bellwood is located on Alabama State Route 85, 10.5 miles (16.9 km) north-northeast of Geneva. Bellwood has a post office with ZIP code 36313.

== Demographics ==
Historical population
Census	Pop.	Note	%±
1910	201		—
1930	299		—
1940	285		−4.7%
1950	263		−7.7%
1960	273		3.8%
U.S. Decennial Census

According to the U.S. Census for 1910, Bellwood initially incorporated in 1907. The incorporated lapsed in the 1910s and it did not appear on the 1920 census rolls. It reincorporated in 1925 and was listed from 1930 to 1960. It disincorporated at some point in the 1960s.
