= Pine Level, Coffee County, Alabama =

Unincorporated community in Alabama, United States

Pine Level, Alabama
- Unincorporated community
- Location within Alabama Location within the United States
- Coordinates: 31°28′33″N 86°11′11″W
- Country: United States
- State: Alabama
- County: Coffee
- Elevation: 472 ft (144 m)
- Time zone: UTC-6 (Central (CST))
  - Summer (DST): UTC-5 (CDT)
- Area code: 334
- GNIS feature ID: 124825

Pine Level is an unincorporated community in Coffee County, Alabama, United States. Pine Level is located on Alabama State Route 141, 8.2 miles (13.2 km) northwest of Elba.
