= Pea River =

River in the United States of America

Coordinates: 31.6031366°N 85.7178174°W

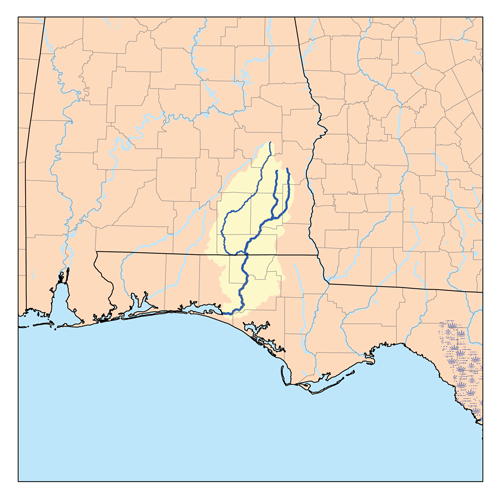
- Pea River (left tributary of Choctawhatchee River)

Location
- Country: United States
- State: Alabama and Florida

Physical characteristics
- Source
  - location: Bullock County, Alabama
  - elevation: 69 ft (21 m)
- Mouth
  - location: Choctawhatchee River
- Length: 154 mi (248 km)

The Pea River is a 154-mile-long (248 km) tributary of the Choctawhatchee River near Geneva, Alabama, United States. It is a popular destination for those with canoes and other small boats, as well as fishermen seeking bass, sunfish, or mullet. The river begins in Bullock County, Alabama, and flows through Elba before joining the Choctawhatchee.

== Course ==
The Pea River begins near Midway, in Bullock County, Alabama, then flows southerly through Elba, where there is a dam, and then south through Ino, Samson, and on to Geneva, where it joins the Choctawhatchee. The river flooded Elba in 1929 and in the 1990s, and joined the Choctawhatchee in flooding Geneva on those same occasions. Although the Pea River begins and ends in Alabama, it makes a short dip into Florida right before it joins the Choctawhatchee at Geneva, Alabama.

The Pea River is navigable by boat to Elba, and beyond, although at low water the most common powerboats are 14 to 16 feet, and powered by outboards.

== Etymology ==
The Pea River gets its name from its pea green color. Indeed, the Muscogee name for the Pea River is Talakhatchee, which means "pea green stream".

== Aquatic life ==
Bass, bream, shellcrackers, mullet, and catfish are caught in the river. Mullet make the trip up from the Gulf of Mexico to feed on the moss that grows on the "rock" walls of the river (actually more of a clay-like substance, probably blue-marl clay, referred to sometimes as soapstone, because it is so slippery when wet) periodically, and a large number are caught from time to time. Bass are more of a challenge.

Historically, the river has been home to gulf sturgeon, who were fished commercially in the early 1900s. Since they have been protected, the sturgeon are making a comeback, and sturgeon as long as six feet long have been seen jumping near the junction in Geneva. Dr. Dewayne Fox did research for his Ph.D. in the Choctawhatchee and Pea Rivers by radio-tagging sturgeon in the Gulf of Mexico and tracking them up the Choctawhatchee and Pea Rivers upstream of Geneva. He was able to collect samples of eggs to prove they were breeding in the Pea and Choctawhatchee rivers.

Suckers are another fish that travel upstream as the weather changes. About the time that the sap begins to flow in the early spring, suckers will seek small tributaries in which to spawn. Fishermen set out gill nets to catch these fish, which are difficult to catch with hook and line. Shad are common in the river, but, since they eat moss, are seldom caught.

The last Saturday in April is set aside by the city of Geneva to celebrate the history of the history of the Choctawhatchee and Pea rivers.
