= Bradford, Alabama =

Unincorporated community in Alabama, United States

- Unincorporated community
- Location within Alabama Location within the United States
- Coordinates: 33°45′07″N 86°42′14″W
- Country: United States
- State: Alabama
- County: Jefferson
- Elevation: 551 ft (168 m)
- Time zone: UTC−6 (Central (CST))
  - Summer (DST): UTC−5 (CDT)
- Area codes: 205, 659
- GNIS feature ID: 114804

Bradford, also known as Dixiana, is an unincorporated community in Jefferson County, Alabama, United States.

== History ==
Bradford was originally named in honor of the English city Bradford by Jim Justice, who was a foreman of the local mines. The post office was then named Dixiana after it was found there was already a post office in Alabama operating under the name "Bradford."

Multiple different companies mined coal at mines in Bradford, including The Alabama By-Products Corporation, the Birmingham Furnace and Manufacturing Company, and Imperial Coal and Coke Company.

A post office operated under the name Dixiana from 1880 to 1984.
