= WGEA =

Radio station in Geneva, Alabama, United States (1953–2019)

- Geneva, Alabama; United States
- Frequency: 1150 kHz

Programming
- Format: Defunct, was talk

Ownership
- Owner: Shelley Broadcasting Company, Inc.

History
- First air date: March 17, 1953
- Last air date: April 11, 2017 (date of license cancellation)
- Call sign meaning: Geneva, Alabama

Technical information
- Facility ID: 60100
- Class: D
- Power: 1,000 watts (day); 35 watts (night)
- Transmitter coordinates: 31°01′17″N 85°52′42″W

WGEA (1150 AM) was a radio station licensed to serve Geneva, Alabama. Established in 1953, the station was owned by Shelley Broadcasting Company, Inc. It aired in talk radio format.

The station was assigned the WGEA call letters by the Federal Communications Commission.

Notable programming included a morning show with local host Clayton Flick, local high school sporting events, and national shows from syndicated hosts Bill Bennett, Mike Gallagher, Dennis Prager, Michael Medved, and Mark Levin.

== History ==
WGEA was put on the air on March 17, 1953, by three brothers - Howard, Clarence and Alton Scott, who owned The Geneva County Reaper. Senator John Sparkman and Governor Gordon Persons attended the formal opening ceremony on April 2, 1953. The station was called, "Voice of the Geneva County Reaper". In the late 1950s, WGEA was purchased by Radio South, owned by Miles and Celeste Ferguson.

In 1962, a group of local businessmen formed the Geneva County Broadcasting Company and bought the station. WGEA-FM (now WPHH in Hope Hull) was launched on June 27, 1969. The FM station was largely programmed separately but did simulcast some popular local news programs in the morning hours. James C. Helms was the general manager from 1962 until his death in 1980, at which time his wife Joan assumed his position and became one of the first female general managers in Alabama radio.

In 1987, WGEA and WGEA-FM were sold to Shelley Broadcasting Company, owned by H. Jack Mizell of Ozark, Alabama. He changed the callsign of the FM station to WRJM-FM and moved its studios to Ozark. Doc Parker became General Manager of the AM station and also hosted "The Breakfast Club," a popular local morning program, until he retired in 2015. WRJM-FM was sold in a bank foreclosure in 2008, but Mizell continued to own and operate WGEA until April 11, 2017, when the Federal Communications Commission canceled the station's license for failure to pay debts that it owed to the commission.

On June 6, 2019, the FCC rescinded the station deletion, and continued operation of WGEA was approved. However, WGEA was again deleted on September 10, 2019.
