= Alabama State Route 125 =

State highway in Alabama

State Route 125

Route information
- Maintained by ALDOT
- Length: 24.720 mi (39.783 km)

Major junctions
- South end: US 84 / SR 87 in Elba
- SR 167 in Victoria
- North end: US 231 south of Brundidge

Location
- Country: United States
- State: Alabama
- Counties: Coffee, Pike

Highway system
- Alabama State Highway System; Interstate; US; State
← SR 124	→ SR 126

State Route 125 (SR 125) is a 24.72-mile-long (39.78 km) state highway in Coffee and Pike counties in the southeastern part of the U.S. state of Alabama. The southern terminus of the highway is at U.S. Route 84 (US 84) and SR 87 in Elba. The northern terminus of the route is at an intersection with US 231 south of Brundidge.

== Route description ==
SR 125 begins at US 84/SR 87 (also unsigned SR 12) in Elba, northeast of the downtown area of the city. Heading northeast, SR 125 travels through Victoria and intersects SR 167. It continues to the northeast and then reaches its northern terminus, an intersection with US 231 (internally designated as SR 53) south of Brundidge.

SR 125 begins at a channelized intersection with US 84 and SR 87 on the northeastern edge of Elba, continuing the trajectory of the AL 203 loop. From its southern terminus the highway travels northeast as a two-lane undivided road passing through alternating pockets of rural farmland and dense southern pine woodlands. The route maintains a relatively straight geometric alignment across northern Coffee County, serving small rural residences and agricultural tracts before passing directly through the unincorporated community of Victoria. Upon crossing the county line into southern Pike County, the highway maintains its northeasterly course through rolling, topographically varied terrain. It intersects minor county corridors, providing critical regional farm-to-market connectivity for nearby agricultural facilities. As it nears its northern terminus, SR 125 passes just west of the Tarentum community before concluding at a standard at-grade intersection with the four-lane divided corridor of US 231 (SR 53) roughly four miles south of the city limits of Brundidge.

== Major intersections ==
County	Location	mi	km	Destinations	Notes
Coffee	Elba	0.000	0.000	US 84 / SR 87 (SR 12) / Smith Avenue – Elba, New Brockton, Enterprise	Southern terminus
Coffee		12.637	20.337	SR 167 – Troy, Enterprise	
Pike		24.720	39.783	US 231 (SR 53) – Brundidge, Ozark	Northern terminus
1.000 mi = 1.609 km; 1.000 km = 0.621 mi
