= Enterprise station =

- Seaboard Coastline Depot
- U.S. National Register of Historic Places
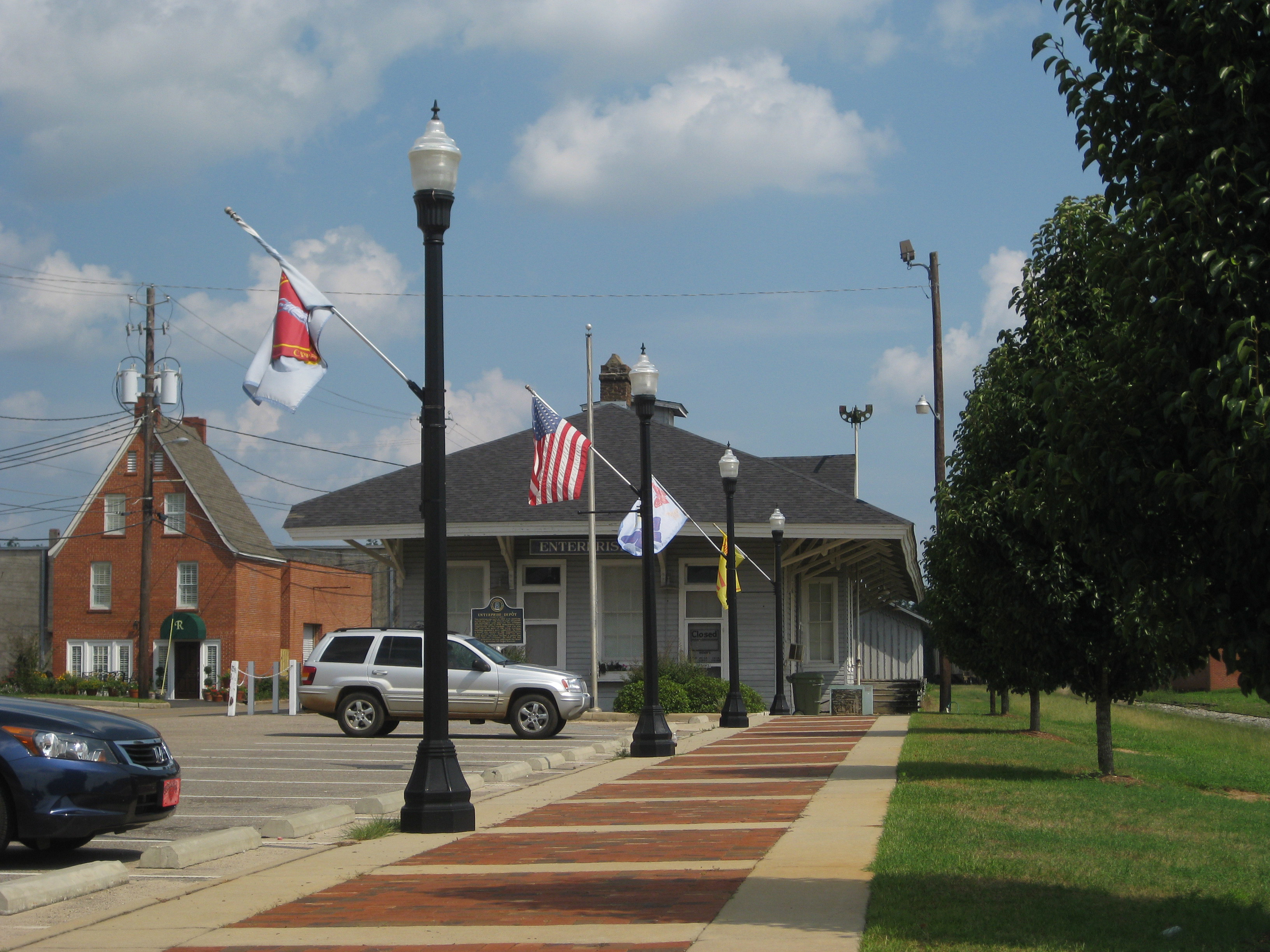
- Seaboard Coastline Depot

- Location within Alabama Location within the United States
- Location: Corner of Railroad and W. College Sts., Enterprise, Alabama
- Coordinates: 31°18′47″N 85°51′15″W
- Area: less than one acre
- Built: 1903
- Built by: Alabama Midland Railway
- NRHP reference No.: 74000405
- Added to NRHP: August 7, 1974

The Enterprise station, also known as the Seaboard Coastline Depot, is a historic train depot in Enterprise, Alabama, United States. It was built in 1903, by the Alabama Midland Railway, which was eventually acquired by the Atlantic Coast Line Railroad. It now houses the Enterprise Depot Museum. It was added to the National Register of Historic Places on August 7, 1974. It is located at the corner of Railroad Street and West College Street.

== See also ==
- National Register of Historic Places listings in Alabama

Preceding station	Atlantic Coast Line Railroad	Following station
New Brockton toward Elba	Elba – Dothan	Waterford toward Dothan
