= Tannehill, Alabama =

- Unincorporated community
- Location within Alabama Location within the United States
- Coordinates: 33°15′37″N 87°4′47″W
- Country: United States
- State: Alabama
- County: Tuscaloosa
- Time zone: UTC-6 (Central (CST))
  - Summer (DST): UTC-5 (CDT)
- GNIS feature ID: 148616

Tannehill is an unincorporated community in Tuscaloosa County, Alabama, United States. Tannehill has a post office with ZIP code 35111. The community is home to Tannehill Valley Baptist Church.
