= Alvin Henderson (American football) =

American football player (born 2006)

No. 22 – Auburn Tigers
- Position: Running back
- Class: Freshman

Personal information
- Born: September 12, 2006 (age 20)
- Listed height: 5 ft 9 in (1.75 m)
- Listed weight: 194 lb (88 kg)

Career information
- High school: Elba (Elba, Alabama)
- College: Auburn (2025–present)

Awards and highlights
- All-American Bowl Player of the Year (2024)
- Stats at ESPN

Alvin Henderson (born September 12, 2006) is an American college football running back for the Auburn Tigers.

== Early life ==
Henderson played football for Elba High School. During his time at Elba, he became the AHSAA all-time leading rusher amassing 10,894 rushing yards. He also became the first high school running back in Alabama to rush for over 10,000 yards. As a result of his accomplishments, Henderson was named the Gatorade Alabama Football Player of the Year and MaxPreps Alabama High School Football Player of the Year.

On April 11, 2024, he committed to play college football at Penn State. On June 21, 2024, Henderson flipped his commitment to Auburn and officially signed with the program on December 4.

College recruiting
Name	Hometown	School	Height	Weight	Commit date
Alvin Henderson; RB	Elba, Alabama	Elba	5 ft 9 in (1.75 m)	194 lb (88 kg)	Jun 21, 2024
Alvin Henderson; RB	Recruit ratings: Rivals: 247Sports: ESPN: (82)				

== College career ==
Henderson enrolled early at Auburn and arrived on campus in January 2025 to join the team.

== Personal life ==
Henderson has eight siblings: Ayden, DaDa, Cordell, Marshawn, Malia, Zy, Maddie, and McKenzie.
