= Daleville City School District =

School district in Alabama

Daleville City School District is a school district in Dale County, Alabama. It serves people in Daleville.

It is also one of three municipal school systems that take on-post Fort Rucker families at the secondary level.

Windham Elementary School serves grades K-6, while Daleville High School serves grades 7-12. The high school's JROTC program has held the rating of "Honor Unit With Distinction", the highest possible unit ranking within the JROTC program, for the past 33 consecutive years (as of 2007). Its rifle team has won seventeen state championships and numerous local competitions. The high school football team was the winner of the 1992 4A football championship, and was runner-up in 1993. In 1997, the high school basketball team reached the state's final four tournament.

Daleville High School's band has 130 members, and broke their own record of students to make Honor Bands. The Daleville band has had 15 students who have made All-State and 37 students to make District Honor Band.
