= Geneva High School (Alabama) =

Public high school located in Geneva, Alabama U.S.

Location
- 505 Panther Drive; Geneva, Alabama 36340; United States
- 31°02′38″N 85°52′45″W

Information
- Type: Public
- School district: Geneva City Schools
- CEEB code: 011220
- NCES School ID: 010164000567
- Principal: Michael Crews
- Teaching staff: 22.52 (on an FTE basis)
- Grades: 9–12
- Enrollment: 369 (2024–25)
- Student to teacher ratio: 16.39
- Colors: Black and gold
- Fight song: Let's Go Black Panthers
- Athletics conference: Alabama High School Athletic Association
- Mascot: PePe
- Team name: Panthers
- Yearbook: Genala Memories
- Website: ghs.gck12.com

Geneva High School is a public secondary school located in Geneva, Alabama. It is the only high school in the Geneva City School District. Athletic teams are known as the Panthers, and they compete in the Alabama High School Athletic Association.

== Academics ==
In 2000, Geneva High School student David N. Simmons was selected as a Presidential Scholar.

== Athletics ==
Geneva High School currently offers:

- Baseball
- Basketball
- Bass fishing
- Cheerleading
- Cross country
- Golf
- Football
- Softball
- Track and field
- Volleyball

=== AHSAA state championships ===
- Boys' track and field 1987, 1988, 1989
- Girls' slow-pitch softball 1999, 2000, 2001

=== Individual state championships ===
In 1975, Eddie Brooks won the Division 3A state championship for the 3-mile cross country. In 2000, Tommy Casey won the Division 4A golf state championship.

== Notable alumni ==
- Albert A. Carmichael, former lieutenant governor of Alabama (1939–1943)
- Early Wynn, former professional baseball player in the Major League Baseball (MLB)
