= DeArmanville, Alabama =

Unincorporated community in Alabama, United States

- Unincorporated community
- Location within Alabama Location within the United States
- Coordinates: 33°37′35″N 85°45′05″W
- Country: United States
- State: Alabama
- County: Calhoun
- Elevation: 673 ft (205 m)
- Time zone: UTC-6 (Central (CST))
  - Summer (DST): UTC-5 (CDT)
- ZIP code: 36257
- Area codes: 256 & 938
- GNIS feature ID: 159491

DeArmanville is an unincorporated community in Calhoun County, Alabama, United States, located on the southeast boundary of Anniston. DeArmanville has a post office with ZIP code 36257.

== Climate ==
The climate in this area is characterized by hot, humid summers and generally mild to cool winters. According to the Köppen Climate Classification system, DeArmanville has a humid subtropical climate, abbreviated "Cfa" on climate maps.
