= Coffee County, Alabama =

County in Alabama, United States

- County
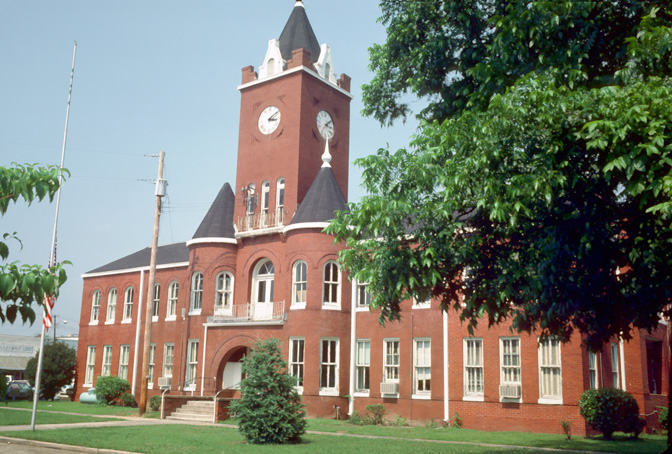
- Original Coffee County Courthouse (Elba)

- Seal

- Location within the U.S. state of Alabama
- Coordinates: 31°24′12″N 85°59′12″W
- Country: United States
- State: Alabama
- Founded: December 29, 1841
- Named for: John Coffee
- Seat: Elba (de jure); Enterprise (annex)
- Largest city: Enterprise

Area
  - Total: 680 sq mi (1,800 km^{2})
  - Land: 679 sq mi (1,760 km^{2})
  - Water: 1.5 sq mi (3.9 km^{2}) 0.2%

Population (2020)
  - Total: 53,465
  - Estimate (2025): 56,953 ▲
  - Density: 78.7/sq mi (30.4/km^{2})
- Time zone: UTC−6 (Central)
  - Summer (DST): UTC−5 (CDT)
- Congressional district: 1st
- Website: www.coffeecounty.us
- County Number 19 on Alabama Licence Plates

Coffee County is a county located in the southeastern part of the U.S. state of Alabama. As of the 2020 census, the population was 53,465. Its name is in honor of General John Coffee.

Coffee County comprises the Enterprise, Micropolitan Statistical Area, which was originally Enterprise–Ozark micropolitan area in 2010 censuses before being split off. It was originally included in the Dothan-Enterprise-Ozark, Combined Statistical Area in its 2012 statistics but the area in its recent years has been separated from the Dothan metropolitan area and Ozark micropolitan area in later censuses and is its own primary statistical area now. Despite the census change of the statistics by the United States Census Bureau, the county still remains culturally connected alongside the two core based areas as it is commonly described as part of what is called the Wiregrass region together and also it shares its locations of United States Army base, Fort Rucker. The county seat is mostly known as Elba, although Enterprise contains a second county courthouse as well.

== History ==
The land in Coffee County was originally part of Dale County, which was incorporated in 1824. Coffee County was formed from the western part of Dale County on December 29, 1841. It was named after John R. Coffee, a soldier in the Creek War of 1813—14. The first county seat was in Wellborn. After the courthouse was destroyed by fire in 1851, the county seat was moved to Elba.

== 2009 shooting ==
in 2009, a familicide followed by an indiscriminate mass shooting occurred between the communities of Kinston, Samson, and Geneva, Alabama, United States, when 28 year old Michael Kenneth McLendon killed ten people, and wounded six, using semi-automatic rifles, a shotgun, and a revolver. It is the deadliest mass killing in Alabama's history.

== Geography ==
According to the United States Census Bureau, the county has a total area of 680 square miles (1,800 km^{2}), of which 679 square miles (1,760 km^{2}) is land and 1.5 square miles (3.9 km^{2}) (0.2%) is water. The county is located in the Wiregrass region of southeast Alabama.

=== Major highways ===
- U.S. Highway 84 / State Route 12 (unsigned)
- U.S. Highway 231 / State Route 53 (unsigned)
- State Route 27
- State Route 51
- State Route 52
- State Route 87
- State Route 88
- State Route 92
- State Route 122
- State Route 125
- State Route 134
- State Route 141
- State Route 166
- State Route 167
- State Route 189
- State Route 192
- State Route 248
- State Route 302

=== Adjacent counties ===
- Pike County (north)
- Dale County (east)
- Geneva County (south)
- Covington County (west)
- Crenshaw County (northwest)

== Demographics ==
Historical population
Census	Pop.	Note	%±
1850	5,940		—
1860	9,623		62.0%
1870	6,171		−35.9%
1880	8,119		31.6%
1890	12,170		49.9%
1900	20,972		72.3%
1910	26,119		24.5%
1920	30,070		15.1%
1930	32,556		8.3%
1940	31,987		−1.7%
1950	30,720		−4.0%
1960	30,583		−0.4%
1970	34,872		14.0%
1980	38,533		10.5%
1990	40,240		4.4%
2000	43,615		8.4%
2010	49,948		14.5%
2020	53,465		7.0%
2025 (est.)	56,953	▲	6.5%
U.S. Decennial Census; 1790–1960 1900–1990; 1990–2000 2010–2020

=== Racial and ethnic composition ===
Coffee County, Alabama – Racial and ethnic composition Note: the US Census treats Hispanic/Latino as an ethnic category. This table excludes Latinos from the racial categories and assigns them to a separate category. Hispanics/Latinos may be of any race.
Race / Ethnicity (NH = Non-Hispanic)	Pop 2000	Pop 2010	Pop 2020	% 2000	% 2010	% 2020
White alone (NH)	32,971	36,134	35,759	75.60%	72.34%	66.88%
Black or African American alone (NH)	7,950	8,257	8,643	18.23%	16.53%	16.17%
Native American or Alaska Native alone (NH)	386	602	405	0.89%	1.21%	0.76%
Asian alone (NH)	409	629	892	0.94%	1.26%	1.67%
Pacific Islander alone (NH)	40	51	57	0.09%	0.10%	0.11%
Other race alone (NH)	58	52	195	0.13%	0.10%	0.36%
Mixed race or Multiracial (NH)	618	1,043	2,627	1.42%	2.09%	4.91%
Hispanic or Latino (any race)	1,183	3,180	4,887	2.71%	6.37%	9.14%
Total	43,615	49,948	53,465	100.00%	100.00%	100.00%

=== 2020 census ===
As of the 2020 census, the county had a population of 53,465. The median age was 39.0 years. 23.7% of residents were under the age of 18 and 17.4% of residents were 65 years of age or older. For every 100 females there were 97.4 males, and for every 100 females age 18 and over there were 95.4 males age 18 and over.

The racial makeup of the county was 69.4% White, 16.4% Black or African American, 1.2% American Indian and Alaska Native, 1.7% Asian, 0.1% Native Hawaiian and Pacific Islander, 3.6% from some other race, and 7.7% from two or more races. Hispanic or Latino residents of any race comprised 9.1% of the population.

52.5% of residents lived in urban areas, while 47.5% lived in rural areas.

There were 21,263 households in the county, of which 31.6% had children under the age of 18 living with them and 27.5% had a female householder with no spouse or partner present. About 27.8% of all households were made up of individuals and 11.8% had someone living alone who was 65 years of age or older.

There were 24,105 housing units, of which 11.8% were vacant. Among occupied housing units, 67.5% were owner-occupied and 32.5% were renter-occupied. The homeowner vacancy rate was 1.9% and the rental vacancy rate was 9.3%.

=== 2010 census ===
As of the census of 2010, there were 49,948 people, 19,849 households, and 13,837 families residing in the county. The population density was 74 people per square mile (29 people/km^{2}). There were 22,330 housing units at an average density of 33 units per square mile (13 units/km^{2}). The racial makeup of the county was 74.7% White, 16.7% Black or African American, 1.3% Native American, 1.3% Asian, 0.2% Pacific Islander, 3.2% from other races, and 2.5% from two or more races. 6.4% of the population were Hispanic or Latino of any race.

The largest self-reported ancestry groups in Coffee County were English (59.9%), German (4.4%), Irish (3.3%), "American" (3.1%), (1.8%), Scottish (1.2%) and Portuguese (1.0%).

There were 19,849 households, out of which 30.1% had children under the age of 18 living with them, 52.6% were married couples living together, 12.9% had a female householder with no husband present, and 30.3% were non-families. 25.4% of all households were made up of individuals, and 9.8% had someone living alone who was 65 years of age or older. The average household size was 2.49 and the average family size was 2.98.

In the county, the population was spread out, with 24.2% under the age of 18, 8.6% from 18 to 24, 27.1% from 25 to 44, 25.7% from 45 to 64, and 14.4% who were 65 years of age or older. The median age was 37.6 years. For every 100 females, there were 97.7 males. For every 100 females age 18 and over, there were 101.3 males.

The median income for a household in the county was $42,253, and the median income for a family was $54,929. Males had a median income of $41,635 versus $29,082 for females. The per capita income for the county was $22,797. About 14.1% of families and 17.2% of the population were below the poverty line, including 26.4% of those under age 18 and 13.4% of those age 65 or over.

== Government ==
Coffee County is reliably Republican at the presidential level. The last Democrat to win the county in a presidential election is Jimmy Carter, who won it by a majority in 1976.

United States presidential election results for Coffee County, Alabama
Year	Republican		Democratic		Third party(ies)	
Year	No.	%	No.	%	No.	%
1844	142	31.07%	315	68.93%	0	0.00%
1848	192	52.46%	174	47.54%	0	0.00%
1852	113	30.54%	239	64.59%	18	4.86%
1856	0	0.00%	703	70.02%	301	29.98%
1860	0	0.00%	2	0.16%	1,272	99.84%
1868	80	8.67%	843	91.33%	0	0.00%
1872	98	11.68%	741	88.32%	0	0.00%
1876	25	2.91%	835	97.09%	0	0.00%
1880	63	7.62%	764	92.38%	0	0.00%
1884	39	4.27%	875	95.73%	0	0.00%
1888	7	0.62%	1,124	99.38%	0	0.00%
1892	47	2.42%	992	51.06%	904	46.53%
1896	114	6.77%	1,494	88.72%	76	4.51%
1900	535	33.82%	998	63.08%	49	3.10%
1904	226	13.15%	1,106	64.34%	387	22.51%
1908	341	18.08%	1,305	69.19%	240	12.73%
1912	68	3.76%	1,277	70.67%	462	25.57%
1916	426	17.21%	2,029	81.95%	21	0.85%
1920	673	27.95%	1,721	71.47%	14	0.58%
1924	323	16.61%	1,597	82.11%	25	1.29%
1928	1,036	39.17%	1,609	60.83%	0	0.00%
1932	95	3.20%	2,868	96.73%	2	0.07%
1936	110	3.33%	3,178	96.16%	17	0.51%
1940	145	6.12%	2,226	93.88%	0	0.00%
1944	115	3.88%	2,846	96.02%	3	0.10%
1948	113	5.25%	0	0.00%	2,039	94.75%
1952	699	15.13%	3,919	84.83%	2	0.04%
1956	973	18.47%	4,163	79.02%	132	2.51%
1960	1,381	23.54%	4,470	76.19%	16	0.27%
1964	4,910	80.19%	0	0.00%	1,213	19.81%
1968	682	6.33%	1,071	9.95%	9,013	83.72%
1972	9,076	80.06%	2,160	19.05%	100	0.88%
1976	4,683	37.02%	7,844	62.00%	124	0.98%
1980	6,760	50.45%	6,140	45.82%	499	3.72%
1984	10,558	69.84%	4,370	28.91%	190	1.26%
1988	8,890	66.57%	4,319	32.34%	146	1.09%
1992	7,591	48.87%	5,776	37.19%	2,166	13.94%
1996	7,805	55.12%	5,168	36.50%	1,186	8.38%
2000	9,938	64.39%	5,220	33.82%	276	1.79%
2004	13,019	73.90%	4,480	25.43%	117	0.66%
2008	14,919	74.12%	5,079	25.23%	130	0.65%
2012	14,666	73.99%	4,925	24.85%	230	1.16%
2016	15,875	76.44%	4,221	20.33%	671	3.23%
2020	16,899	75.87%	5,076	22.79%	300	1.35%
2024	17,495	78.39%	4,601	20.61%	223	1.00%

United States Senate election results for Coffee County, Alabama2
Year	Republican		Democratic		Third party(ies)	
Year	No.	%	No.	%	No.	%
2020	16,400	73.95%	5,753	25.94%	25	0.11%

United States Senate election results for Coffee County, Alabama3
Year	Republican		Democratic		Third party(ies)	
Year	No.	%	No.	%	No.	%
2022	11,411	81.52%	2,298	16.42%	289	2.06%

Alabama Gubernatorial election results for Coffee County
Year	Republican		Democratic		Third party(ies)	
Year	No.	%	No.	%	No.	%
2022	11,267	80.46%	2,221	15.86%	516	3.68%

== Communities ==
=== Cities ===
- Elba (county seat)
- Enterprise (partly in Dale County)

=== Towns ===
- Kinston
- New Brockton

=== Unincorporated communities ===
- Alberton
- Basin
- Battens Crossroads
- Brooklyn
- Central City
- Clintonville
- Curtis
- Damascus
- Danleys Crossroads
- Frisco
- Goodman
- Ino
- Jack
- Java
- Keyton
- Pine Level
- Richburg
- Roeton
- Tabernacle
- Victoria

== Education ==
School districts include:

- Coffee County School District
- Elba City School District
- Enterprise City School District

Fort Rucker residents are within the Department of Defense Education Activity (DoDEA) system, for elementary school. Students on-post in Fort Rucker beyond the elementary level may attend non-DoDEA schools for secondary levels, with an on-post family choosing one of the following three options: Enterprise City, Daleville City School System, or Ozark City Schools.

== Notable people ==
- Katie Britt (b. 1982) – U.S. senator
- Jim Folsom (1908–1987) – governor of Alabama
- Barry Moore (b. 1966) – U.S. representative
- Alex Ríos (b. 1981) – baseball player
- Zig Ziglar (1926–2012) – author, salesman, and Christian motivational speaker

== In popular culture ==
The county is referred to in Joe David Brown's 1971 novel Addie Pray, which inspired the movie Paper Moon.

== See also ==
- National Register of Historic Places listings in Coffee County, Alabama
- Properties on the Alabama Register of Landmarks and Heritage in Coffee County, Alabama
