= Geneva, Alabama =

City in Alabama, United States

Geneva
- City
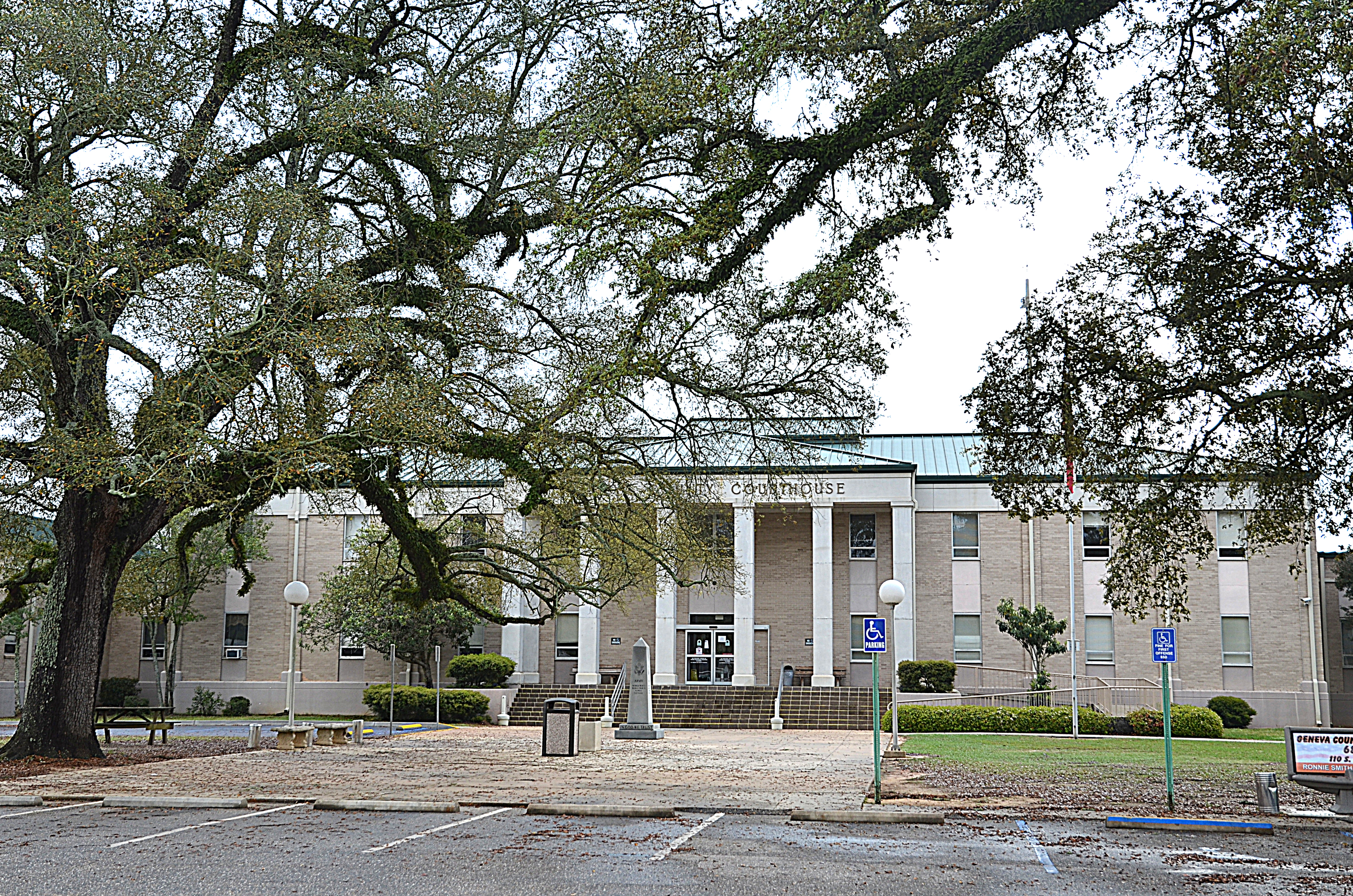
- The Geneva County Courthouse in Geneva

- Seal
- Motto: "Where the Rivers Meet"
- Location of Geneva in Geneva County, Alabama.
- Coordinates: 31°02′39″N 85°52′16″W
- Country: United States
- State: Alabama
- County: Geneva

Area
  - Total: 16.07 sq mi (41.62 km^{2})
  - Land: 15.88 sq mi (41.13 km^{2})
  - Water: 0.19 sq mi (0.49 km^{2})
- Elevation: 121 ft (37 m)

Population (2020)
  - Total: 4,245
  - Density: 267/sq mi (103.2/km^{2})
- Time zone: UTC-6 (Central (CST))
  - Summer (DST): UTC-5 (CDT)
- ZIP code: 36340
- Area code: 334
- FIPS code: 01-29464
- GNIS feature ID: 2403687
- Website: https://www.genevaal.gov/

Geneva is a city in and the county seat of Geneva County, Alabama, United States. It was incorporated in 1875. It is part of the Dothan, Alabama metropolitan area. Since 1940, it has been the largest city of Geneva County, and had a population of 4,292 as of the 2020 census.

== History ==
In late December 1862, the stern-wheel steamship Bloomer was in port on the Choctawhatchee River in Geneva. She was captured by a group of Union troops from the 91st New York Volunteers led by Lieutenant James H. Stewart. The Bloomer was then taken to Pensacola, Florida.

On March 10, 2009, in the Alabama towns of Kinston, Samson, and Geneva, a man named Michael Kenneth McLendon, twenty eight, of Coffee County, committed a deadly rampage in the area. Utilizing a semi-automatic rifle, a shotgun and a revolver, McLendon's spree resulted in the murder of 10 people, as well as the injury of 6 individuals.

The town suffered extensive damage from an EF2 tornado on January 25, 2026.

== Geography ==
Geneva is located south of the center of Geneva County at the confluence of the Pea River with the Choctawhatchee River. Alabama State Route 52 passes through the city north of downtown, leading northeast 11 miles (18 km) to Hartford and northwest 12 miles (19 km) to Samson. Dothan is 34 miles (55 km) to the northeast via Route 52. Alabama State Route 27 passes through the center of Geneva, leading north 22 miles (35 km) to Enterprise and southwest 5 miles (8 km) to the Florida border.

According to the U.S. Census Bureau, the city has a total area of 16.1 square miles (41.6 km^{2}), of which 15.9 square miles (41.1 km^{2}) is land and 0.2 square miles (0.5 km^{2}), or 1.17%, is water. The Choctawhatchee River forms the eastern border of the city, flowing south to Choctawhatchee Bay in Florida, which enters the Gulf of Mexico at Destin.

=== Climate ===
The climate in this area is characterized by hot, humid summers and generally mild to cool winters. According to the Köppen Climate Classification system, Geneva has a humid subtropical climate, abbreviated "Cfa" on climate maps. The hottest temperature recorded in Geneva was 107 °F (42 °C) on August 14, 1954, while the coldest temperature recorded was −3 °F (−19 °C) on February 13, 1899.

Climate data for Geneva, Alabama, 1991–2020 normals, extremes 1892–present
Month	Jan	Feb	Mar	Apr	May	Jun	Jul	Aug	Sep	Oct	Nov	Dec	Year
Record high °F (°C)	89 (32)	86 (30)	92 (33)	96 (36)	102 (39)	106 (41)	104 (40)	107 (42)	105 (41)	98 (37)	89 (32)	92 (33)	107 (42)
Mean maximum °F (°C)	76.0 (24.4)	78.2 (25.7)	83.2 (28.4)	87.1 (30.6)	92.7 (33.7)	95.4 (35.2)	96.5 (35.8)	95.9 (35.5)	94.0 (34.4)	88.8 (31.6)	82.5 (28.1)	77.6 (25.3)	97.6 (36.4)
Mean daily maximum °F (°C)	61.8 (16.6)	65.9 (18.8)	73.2 (22.9)	79.2 (26.2)	86.6 (30.3)	90.7 (32.6)	92.3 (33.5)	91.5 (33.1)	88.4 (31.3)	80.8 (27.1)	71.0 (21.7)	64.1 (17.8)	78.8 (26.0)
Daily mean °F (°C)	48.3 (9.1)	52.2 (11.2)	58.6 (14.8)	64.6 (18.1)	72.6 (22.6)	78.6 (25.9)	80.7 (27.1)	80.1 (26.7)	76.2 (24.6)	66.5 (19.2)	56.3 (13.5)	50.6 (10.3)	65.4 (18.6)
Mean daily minimum °F (°C)	34.8 (1.6)	38.5 (3.6)	44.0 (6.7)	50.0 (10.0)	58.6 (14.8)	66.5 (19.2)	69.0 (20.6)	68.7 (20.4)	64.0 (17.8)	52.2 (11.2)	41.7 (5.4)	37.1 (2.8)	52.1 (11.2)
Mean minimum °F (°C)	20.4 (−6.4)	23.2 (−4.9)	28.2 (−2.1)	36.1 (2.3)	46.0 (7.8)	59.5 (15.3)	65.3 (18.5)	62.9 (17.2)	52.8 (11.6)	37.0 (2.8)	26.8 (−2.9)	23.4 (−4.8)	18.4 (−7.6)
Record low °F (°C)	2 (−17)	−3 (−19)	18 (−8)	30 (−1)	40 (4)	44 (7)	56 (13)	55 (13)	37 (3)	26 (−3)	16 (−9)	7 (−14)	−3 (−19)
Average precipitation inches (mm)	5.37 (136)	5.76 (146)	5.63 (143)	5.05 (128)	3.33 (85)	6.26 (159)	6.34 (161)	5.43 (138)	5.14 (131)	3.57 (91)	4.78 (121)	5.60 (142)	62.26 (1,581)
Average snowfall inches (cm)	0.0 (0.0)	0.1 (0.25)	0.0 (0.0)	0.0 (0.0)	0.0 (0.0)	0.0 (0.0)	0.0 (0.0)	0.0 (0.0)	0.0 (0.0)	0.0 (0.0)	0.0 (0.0)	0.0 (0.0)	0.1 (0.25)
Average precipitation days (≥ 0.01 in)	9.2	9.0	8.2	7.6	7.5	11.6	14.3	12.7	8.1	6.0	7.0	9.2	110.4
Average snowy days (≥ 0.1 in)	0.0	0.1	0.0	0.0	0.0	0.0	0.0	0.0	0.0	0.0	0.0	0.0	0.1
Source: NOAA

== Demographics ==
Historical population
Census	Pop.	Note	%±
1870	126		—
1890	637		—
1900	1,032		62.0%
1910	969		−6.1%
1920	1,581		63.2%
1930	1,593		0.8%
1940	2,803		76.0%
1950	3,579		27.7%
1960	3,840		7.3%
1970	4,398		14.5%
1980	4,866		10.6%
1990	4,681		−3.8%
2000	4,388		−6.3%
2010	4,452		1.5%
2020	4,245		−4.6%
U.S. Decennial Census; 2013 Estimate

=== Racial and ethnic composition ===
Geneva city, Alabama – Racial and ethnic composition Note: the US Census treats Hispanic/Latino as an ethnic category. This table excludes Latinos from the racial categories and assigns them to a separate category. Hispanics/Latinos may be of any race.
Race / Ethnicity (NH = Non-Hispanic)	Pop 1980	Pop 1990	Pop 2000	Pop 2010	Pop 2020	% 1980	% 1990	% 2000	% 2010	% 2020
White alone (NH)	4,138	3,942	3,667	3,654	3,248	85.04%	84.21%	83.57%	82.08%	76.51%
Black or African American alone (NH)	629	684	622	615	600	12.93%	14.61%	14.18%	13.81%	14.13%
Native American or Alaska Native alone (NH)	27	19	14	16	32	0.55%	0.41%	0.32%	0.36%	0.75%
Asian alone (NH)	0	2	2	17	34	0.00%	0.04%	0.05%	0.38%	0.80%
Native Hawaiian or Pacific Islander alone (NH)	x	x	1	1	0	x	x	0.02%	0.02%	0.00%
Other race alone (NH)	0	0	0	5	7	0.00%	0.00%	0.00%	0.11%	0.16%
Mixed race or Multiracial (NH)	x	x	34	64	210	x	x	0.77%	1.44%	4.95%
Hispanic or Latino (any race)	72	34	48	80	114	1.48%	0.73%	1.09%	1.80%	2.69%
Total	4,866	4,681	4,388	4,452	4,245	100.00%	100.00%	100.00%	100.00%	100.00%

=== 2020 census ===
As of the 2020 census, Geneva had a population of 4,245. The median age was 44.6 years. 21.0% of residents were under the age of 18 and 23.4% of residents were 65 years of age or older. For every 100 females there were 92.5 males, and for every 100 females age 18 and over there were 89.5 males age 18 and over.

There were 1,737 households and 1,007 families in the city; 28.6% had children under the age of 18 living in them. Of all households, 39.1% were married-couple households, 19.2% were households with a male householder and no spouse or partner present, and 35.6% were households with a female householder and no spouse or partner present. About 32.7% of all households were made up of individuals and 17.6% had someone living alone who was 65 years of age or older.

0.0% of residents lived in urban areas, while 100.0% lived in rural areas.

There were 1,971 housing units, of which 11.9% were vacant. The homeowner vacancy rate was 1.9% and the rental vacancy rate was 8.7%.

=== 2010 census ===
At the 2010 census there were 4,452 people, 1,826 households, and 1,204 families living in the city. The population density was 294.8 inhabitants per square mile (113.8/km^{2}). There were 2,090 housing units at an average density of 141 per square mile (54/km^{2}). The racial makeup of the city was 83.2% White, 14.0% Black or African American, 0.4% Native American, 0.4% Asian, 0.0% Pacific Islander, 0.5% from other races, and 1.5% from two or more races. 1.8% of the population were Hispanic or Latino of any race. Of the 1,826 households 23.4% had children under the age of 18 living with them, 45.2% were married couples living together, 15.6% had a female householder with no husband present, and 34.1% were non-families. 31.5% of households were one person and 15.5% were one person aged 65 or older. The average household size was 2.36 and the average family size was 2.94.

The age distribution was 21.4% under the age of 18, 8.0% from 18 to 24, 22.1% from 25 to 44, 28.1% from 45 to 64, and 20.3 who were 65 or older. The median age was 43.6 years. For every 100 females, there were 90.7 males. For every 100 females age 18 and over, there were 96.1 males.

=== 2000 census ===
At the 2000 census there were 4,388 people, 1,801 households, and 1,197 families living in the city. The population density was 295.1 inhabitants per square mile (113.9/km^{2}). There were 2,097 housing units at an average density of 141.0 per square mile (54.4/km^{2}). The racial makeup of the city was 84.12% White, 14.18% Black or African American, 0.32% Native American, 0.05% Asian, 0.02% Pacific Islander, 0.46% from other races, and 0.87% from two or more races. 1.09% of the population were Hispanic or Latino of any race. Of the 1,801 households 29.9% had children under the age of 18 living with them, 48.7% were married couples living together, 14.2% had a female householder with no husband present, and 33.5% were non-families. 31.4% of households were one person and 15.2% were one person aged 65 or older. The average household size was 2.35 and the average family size was 2.94.

The age distribution was 24.0% under the age of 18, 8.0% from 18 to 24, 24.3% from 25 to 44, 25.0% from 45 to 64, and 18.6% 65 or older. The median age was 40 years. For every 100 females, there were 89.4 males. For every 100 females age 18 and over, there were 82.3 males.

== Landscape ==
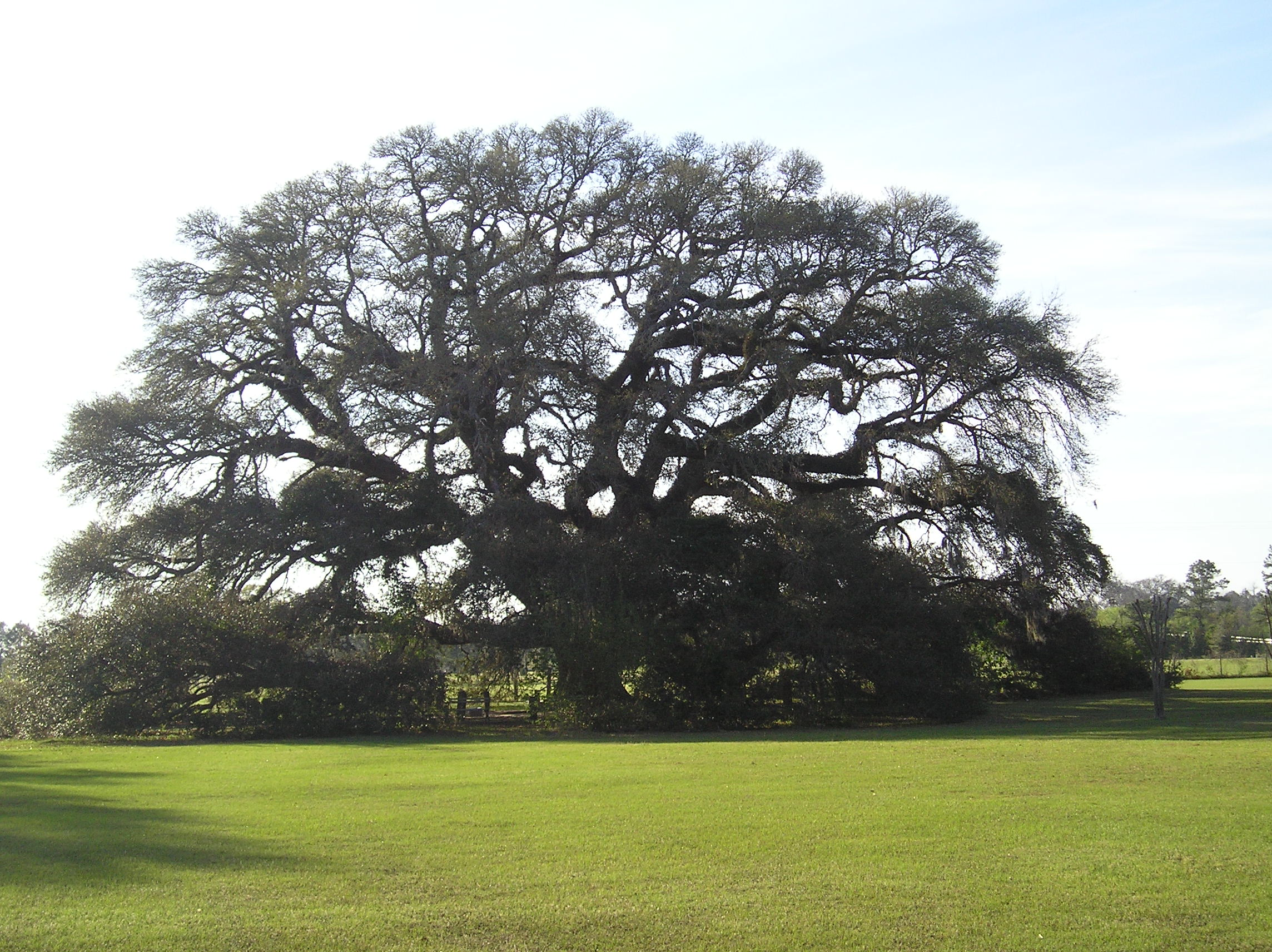
Constitution Oak, a live oak at the river junction in Geneva. It is believed to be among the largest and oldest live oaks in the state.

Geneva is settled on the junction of the Choctawhatchee River and Pea River. The Choctawhatchee River runs all the way to the Choctawhatchee Bay at Freeport, Florida, which flows into the Gulf of Mexico. Because of this, Geneva was a busy trading center for steam-powered riverboats in the late 19th and early 20th centuries.

== Culture ==
Every year in April, Geneva holds a River Festival, which brings in hundreds of people from all over the country to the small town. The River Festival is held on the junction of the two rivers, at Robert Fowler Park, and has many competitive events, such as a 5 miles (8 km) road race, greasy pole climb, canoe race, and tug-of-war.

== Media ==
- Geneva County Reaper (1901–2024)

== Education ==
Geneva has the James A. Mulkey Elementary School, Geneva Middle School, and Geneva High School located within its city limits.

== Notable people ==
- Elizabeth B. Andrews, former U.S. Representative, wife of congressman George William Andrews
- William Oscar Mulkey, former U.S. Congressman for the 3rd District of Alabama
- Siran Stacy, former NFL running back
