= Elba, Alabama =

City in and county seat of Coffee County, Alabama

Elba
- City
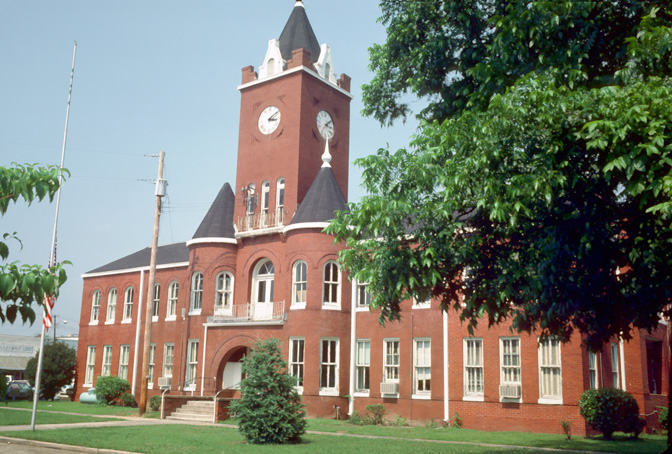
- Coffee County Courthouse in Elba

- Flag Logo
- Nickname: The City of Flowing Wells
- Location of Elba in Coffee County, Alabama.
- Coordinates: 31°24′32″N 86°05′50″W
- Country: United States
- State: Alabama
- County: Coffee
- Settled: Early 1830s
- Incorporated: April 13, 1853

Government
  - Type: City Council/Mayor

Area
  - Total: 15.42 sq mi (39.93 km^{2})
  - Land: 15.34 sq mi (39.73 km^{2})
  - Water: 0.081 sq mi (0.21 km^{2})
- Elevation: 190 ft (58 m)

Population (2020)
  - Total: 3,508
  - Density: 228.7/sq mi (88.31/km^{2})
- Time zone: UTC-6 (Central (CST))
  - Summer (DST): UTC-5 (CDT)
- ZIP code: 36323
- Area code: 334
- FIPS code: 01-23296
- GNIS feature ID: 2403549
- Website: www.elbaal.gov

Elba is a city in and the county seat of Coffee County, Alabama, United States. It is the official seat, although there are two county courthouses, with the other one being located in the city of Enterprise. At the time of the 2020 US Census, Elba's population was 3,508. Elba is part of the Enterprise micropolitan statistical area.

== History ==
The town which eventually became Elba originated near a ferry across the Pea River in the early 1830s. Originally called Bridgeville, a U.S. post office was established in the town by 1841. In 1851, a lottery to determine a new name for the town was held. One citizen had been reading a biography of Napoleon Bonaparte, and his suggestion of "Elba" as its name was the winner when it was drawn from a hat before any of the other suggestions. Elba became the county seat of Coffee County in 1852.

A logging railroad first reached Elba on March 20, 1892, with the first permanent rail line arriving in October 1898. The "Dorsey Trailer Company" was constructed at the end of this railroad line, and this company manufactured the highway trailers that served on railroads and highways starting with the piggyback railroad or containerized cargo boom of the second half of the 20th century. The new railroad line ended in West Elba, where the "New Town" industrial section of the town was located. The Seaboard System Railroad ceased all railroad service to Elba, including freight service, on November 27, 1984.

The Pea River is an essential component of the history of Elba. The river was originally called the Talakatchee River by the Creek Indians. (In the Creek language, talak means "pea", and hatchee means "small river".) The Pea River frequently flooded, causing great damage to the town. The Lincoln flood of 1865, named for the assassination of Abraham Lincoln in the same year, was the first to destroy the town. Another devastating flood occurred in 1929 when the river crested at a depth of 43.5 feet (13.3 m) early on March 15. Airplanes were used to drop supplies to the completely inundated town. There was only one death from the flood, an African-American man named "Phoe" Larkins. A child born at the Elba Hotel during this flood was named "Noah Tucker" after the biblical character Noah. Vivian Harper received the Theodore N. Vail Silver Medal for her heroic actions during the flood.

A levee was built around the town in 1930. Flood gates were erected and drainage systems were improved. Floods continued, however, with especially severe inundations in 1938, 1959 and 1975. The worst flood ever recorded in Elba occurred in 1990, with a river crest of 48 feet (15 m). The levee broke and Whitewater Creek overflowed into the town. Elba was completely flooded for four days, and the town was nearly destroyed. More floods struck Elba in 1994 and 1998.

== Geography ==
Elba is located in western Coffee County.

U.S. Route 84 runs west to east as a northern bypass of the city, leading east 9 mi (14 km) to New Brockton and southwest 16 mi (26 km) to Opp. Many state highways run through the city, namely Alabama State Routes 87, 125, 189, and 203. AL-203 forms the western bypass of the city. AL-87 runs from south to north through the center of the city, leading north 30 mi (48 km) to Troy and south 24 mi (39 km) to Samson. AL-189 runs to the west of the city from south to north, leading northwest 16 mi (26 km) to U.S. Route 331 near Brantley and southwest 17 mi (27 km) to Kinston. AL-125 runs northeast from the city 13 mi (21 km) to the community of Victoria.

According to the U.S. Census Bureau, the city has a total area of 15.4 square miles (39.9 km^{2}), of which 15.3 square miles (39.7 km^{2}) is land and 0.077 square miles (0.2 km^{2}), or 0.52%, is water.

Elba is located beside the banks of the Pea River.

=== Climate ===
The climate in this area is characterized by hot, humid summers and generally mild to cool winters. According to the Köppen Climate Classification system, Elba has a humid subtropical climate, abbreviated "Cfa" on climate maps.

Climate data for Elba, 1991–2020 simulated normals (190 ft elevation)
Month	Jan	Feb	Mar	Apr	May	Jun	Jul	Aug	Sep	Oct	Nov	Dec	Year
Mean daily maximum °F (°C)	60.6 (15.9)	64.6 (18.1)	71.8 (22.1)	78.4 (25.8)	85.6 (29.8)	90.3 (32.4)	91.9 (33.3)	91.4 (33.0)	88.0 (31.1)	80.1 (26.7)	70.2 (21.2)	63.0 (17.2)	78.0 (25.5)
Daily mean °F (°C)	48.7 (9.3)	52.2 (11.2)	59.0 (15.0)	65.7 (18.7)	73.4 (23.0)	79.5 (26.4)	81.9 (27.7)	81.3 (27.4)	75.4 (24.1)	67.3 (19.6)	57.0 (13.9)	51.3 (10.7)	66.1 (18.9)
Mean daily minimum °F (°C)	36.7 (2.6)	39.9 (4.4)	46.4 (8.0)	52.9 (11.6)	61.0 (16.1)	68.9 (20.5)	71.8 (22.1)	71.2 (21.8)	66.4 (19.1)	54.7 (12.6)	43.9 (6.6)	39.6 (4.2)	54.5 (12.5)
Average precipitation inches (mm)	5.35 (135.80)	4.91 (124.68)	5.23 (132.88)	4.83 (122.78)	3.79 (96.16)	5.55 (140.89)	6.58 (167.10)	5.49 (139.57)	6.57 (166.77)	3.47 (88.24)	4.04 (102.61)	5.21 (132.43)	61.02 (1,549.91)
Average dew point °F (°C)	39.2 (4.0)	42.1 (5.6)	46.9 (8.3)	53.6 (12.0)	61.3 (16.3)	68.5 (20.3)	71.8 (22.1)	71.6 (22.0)	67.1 (19.5)	56.5 (13.6)	47.1 (8.4)	42.6 (5.9)	55.7 (13.2)
Source: PRISM Climate Group

== Demographics ==
Historical population
Census	Pop.	Note	%±
1880	222		—
1890	285		28.4%
1900	635		122.8%
1910	1,079		69.9%
1920	1,681		55.8%
1930	2,523		50.1%
1940	2,363		−6.3%
1950	2,936		24.2%
1960	4,321		47.2%
1970	4,634		7.2%
1980	4,340		−6.3%
1990	4,011		−7.6%
2000	4,185		4.3%
2010	3,940		−5.9%
2020	3,508		−11.0%
U.S. Decennial Census; 2013 Estimate

=== Racial and ethnic composition ===
Elba city, Alabama – Racial and ethnic composition Note: the US Census treats Hispanic/Latino as an ethnic category. This table excludes Latinos from the racial categories and assigns them to a separate category. Hispanics/Latinos may be of any race.
Race / Ethnicity (NH = Non-Hispanic)	Pop 1980	Pop 1990	Pop 2000	Pop 2010	Pop 2020	% 1980	% 1990	% 2000	% 2010	% 2020
White alone (NH)	3,337	2,929	2,656	2,435	1,994	76.89%	73.02%	63.46%	61.80%	56.84%
Black or African American alone (NH)	944	1,051	1,429	1,350	1,270	21.75%	26.20%	34.15%	34.26%	36.20%
Native American or Alaska Native alone (NH)	14	21	24	47	23	0.32%	0.52%	0.57%	1.19%	0.66%
Asian alone (NH)	6	0	1	12	2	0.14%	0.00%	0.02%	0.30%	0.06%
Native Hawaiian or Pacific Islander alone (NH)	x	x	1	0	0	x	x	0.02%	0.00%	0.00%
Other race alone (NH)	0	0	1	7	15	0.00%	0.00%	0.02%	0.18%	0.43%
Mixed race or Multiracial (NH)	x	x	30	44	130	x	x	0.72%	1.12%	3.71%
Hispanic or Latino (any race)	39	10	43	45	74	0.90%	0.25%	1.03%	1.14%	2.11%
Total	4,340	4,011	4,185	3,940	3,508	100.00%	100.00%	100.00%	100.00%	100.00%

=== 2020 census ===
As of the 2020 census, there were 3,508 people, 1,343 households, and 917 families in the city. The median age was 44.6 years. 19.8% of residents were under the age of 18 and 21.7% of residents were 65 years of age or older. For every 100 females there were 98.0 males, and for every 100 females age 18 and over there were 100.4 males age 18 and over.

0.0% of residents lived in urban areas, while 100.0% lived in rural areas.

There were 1,343 households in Elba, of which 28.1% had children under the age of 18 living in them. Of all households, 35.2% were married-couple households, 20.1% were households with a male householder and no spouse or partner present, and 39.8% were households with a female householder and no spouse or partner present. About 34.3% of all households were made up of individuals and 18.0% had someone living alone who was 65 years of age or older.

There were 1,655 housing units, of which 18.9% were vacant. The homeowner vacancy rate was 4.3% and the rental vacancy rate was 9.1%.

=== 2010 census ===
As of the census of 2010, there were 3,940 people, 1,547 households, and 991 families residing in the city. The population density was 257 inhabitants per square mile (99/km^{2}). There were 1,772 housing units at an average density of 115 units per square mile (44 units/km^{2}). The racial makeup of the city was 62.1% White, 34.3% Black or African American, 1.2% Native American, 0.3% Asian, 0.2% Pacific Islander, 0.8% from other races, and 1.2% from two or more races. 1.1% of the population were Hispanic or Latino of any race.

There were 1,547 households, out of which 25.3% had children under the age of 18 living with them, 39.9% were married couples living together, 19.8% had a female householder with no husband present, and 35.9% were non-families. 32.6% of all households were made up of individuals, and 15.5% had someone living alone who was 65 years of age or older. The average household size was 2.34 and the average family size was 2.97.

In the city, the population was spread out, with 22.0% under the age of 18, 8.1% from 18 to 24, 24.9% from 25 to 44, 25.4% from 45 to 64, and 19.6% who were 65 years of age or older. The median age was 40.9 years. For every 100 females, there were 98.0 males. For every 100 females age 18 and over, there were 110.9 males.

The median income for a household in the city was $28,975, and the median income for a family was $32,065. Males had a median income of $31,652 versus $21,786 for females. The per capita income for the city was $14,878. About 27.6% of families and 27.1% of the population were below the poverty line, including 40.4% of those under age 18 and 17.8% of those age 65 or over.

== Education ==
Public education is provided by the Elba City Public School District. There are two schools in the city:

Elba High School (grades 7 through 12)
Elba Elementary School (grades K through 6)

== Media ==
- Radio stations

WZTZ 101.1 FM (Sports)

== Notable people ==
- Robert D. Bullard, "Father of Environmental Justice"; Dean, School of Public Affairs, Texas Southern University
- Alpheus Ellis, Florida Banker and Philanthropist
- James E. "Big Jim" Folsom, only Coffee County native to become governor of Alabama
- Alvin Henderson, American football player
- Troy King, Alabama Attorney General from 2004 to 2011
- Ronald McKinnon, National Football League player
- Cornelia Ellis Wallace, the second wife of Governor George C. Wallace, Jr., and the First Lady of Alabama
