= Esto, Florida =

- Town
- Town of Esto
- Seal
- Motto: "The Home of Two-Toed Tom"
- Location in Holmes County and the state of Florida
- Coordinates: 30°58′55″N 85°38′35″W
- Country: United States
- State: Florida
- County: Holmes
- Settled: c. 1882-1901
- Incorporated: 1963
- Named after: Spanish word for "this (is it/the place)"

Government
  - Type: President-Council
  - Council President: Greg Wells
  - Council Vice President: Teresa Harrison
  - Council Members: Phyllis Reif, Heather Huckaby, and Joshua Davenport
  - Town Clerk: Ben Tew
  - Town Attorney: Michelle Blankenship-Jordan

Area
  - Total: 2.37 sq mi (6.13 km^{2})
  - Land: 2.18 sq mi (5.64 km^{2})
  - Water: 0.19 sq mi (0.48 km^{2})
- Elevation: 233 ft (71 m)

Population (2020)
  - Total: 341
  - Density: 156.5/sq mi (60.41/km^{2})
- Time zone: UTC-6 (Central (CST))
  - Summer (DST): UTC-5 (CDT)
- ZIP code: 32425
- Area code(s): 850, 448
- FIPS code: 12-21250
- GNIS feature ID: 2406463
- Website: estoflorida.com

Esto is a town in Holmes County, Florida, United States. The Town of Esto is located on the Florida Panhandle in North Florida. The population was 341 at the 2020 census.

== Geography ==
The approximate coordinates for the Town of Esto is located in northeastern Holmes County.

It is bordered to the north by the state of Alabama and to the east by the town of Noma, Florida. Florida State Road 79 is the main road through town, leading south 13 miles (21 km) to Bonifay, the Holmes County seat, and north (as Alabama State Route 167) 9 miles (14 km) to Hartford, Alabama. Florida State Road 2 follows the southern border of Esto, and leads east 8 miles (13 km) to Graceville and west 20 miles (32 km) to State Road 81. Dothan, Alabama, 25 miles (40 km) to the northeast, is the closest city with more than 50,000 people.

According to the United States Census Bureau, the town of Esto has a total area of 2.4 square miles (6.1 km^{2}), of which 2.2 square miles (5.6 km^{2}) are land and 0.2 square miles (0.5 km^{2}), or 7.89%, are water.

=== Climate ===
The climate in this area is characterized by hot, humid summers and generally mild winters. According to the Köppen climate classification, the Town of Esto has a humid subtropical climate zone (Cfa).

== Demographics ==
Historical population
Census	Pop.	Note	%±
1910	340		—
1920	269		−20.9%
1930	190		−29.4%
1940	213		12.1%
1950	217		1.9%
1960	148		−31.8%
1970	210		41.9%
1980	304		44.8%
1990	253		−16.8%
2000	356		40.7%
2010	364		2.2%
2020	341		−6.3%
U.S. Decennial Census

=== 2010 and 2020 census ===
Esto racial composition (Hispanics excluded from racial categories) (NH = Non-Hispanic)
Race	Pop 2010	Pop 2020	% 2010	% 2020
White (NH)	342	299	93.96%	87.68%
Black or African American (NH)	4	14	1.10%	4.11%
Native American or Alaska Native (NH)	2	4	0.55%	1.17%
Asian (NH)	2	0	0.55%	0.00%
Pacific Islander or Native Hawaiian (NH)	0	0	0.00%	0.00%
Some other race (NH)	0	3	0.00%	0.88%
Two or more races/Multiracial (NH)	4	6	1.10%	1.76%
Hispanic or Latino (any race)	10	15	2.75%	4.40%
Total	364	341		

As of the 2020 United States census, there were 341 people, 122 households, and 94 families residing in the town.

As of the 2010 United States census, there were 364 people, 124 households, and 97 families residing in the town.

=== 2000 census ===
As of the census of 2000, there were 356 people, 144 households, and 95 families residing in the town. The population density was 161.6 inhabitants per square mile (62.4/km^{2}). There were 167 housing units at an average density of 75.8 per square mile (29.3/km^{2}). The racial makeup of the town was 92.13% White, 2.25% African American, 3.93% Native American, 0.56% from other races, and 1.12% from two or more races. Hispanic or Latino of any race were 2.81% of the population.

In 2000, there were 144 households, out of which 30.6% had children under the age of 18 living with them, 50.7% were married couples living together, 9.0% had a female householder with no husband present, and 34.0% were non-families. 31.3% of all households were made up of individuals, and 17.4% had someone living alone who was 65 years of age or older. The average household size was 2.47 and the average family size was 3.09.

In 2000, in the town, the population was spread out, with 28.1% under the age of 18, 7.6% from 18 to 24, 23.3% from 25 to 44, 26.4% from 45 to 64, and 14.6% who were 65 years of age or older. The median age was 37 years. For every 100 females, there were 110.7 males. For every 100 females age 18 and over, there were 100.0 males.

In 2000, the median income for a household in the town was $31,667, and the median income for a family was $36,563. Males had a median income of $30,313 versus $15,625 for females. The per capita income for the town was $12,961. About 15.7% of families and 12.5% of the population were below the poverty line, including 16.8% of those under age 18 and none of those age 65 or over.

== Arts and culture ==
Since 1987, the Two-Toed Tom Festival has been held annually in the town. The theme of the festival is in remembrance of an infamous, 18-foot alligator from the early 1900s that was known to kill farmers' livestock (such as cattle) as well as humans. People would know it was that specific alligator because of his distinctive footprints, being it only had two toes on one of its legs due to a steel animal trap that failed to capture it. This is how he got the name "Two-Toed Tom". Up until the 1970s, people claimed to see Tom or his unique footprints in and around the town and Holmes County.
