= Florida State Road 81 =

State highway in Florida, United States

State Road 81
- Florida State Road 81 highlighted in red

Route information
- Maintained by FDOT
- Length: 39.466 mi (63.514 km)

Major junctions
- South end: SR 20 at Bruce
- I-10 in Ponce de Leon; US 90 in Ponce de Leon
- North end: SR 87 towards Samson, AL

Location
- Country: United States
- State: Florida
- Counties: Walton, Holmes

Highway system
- Florida State Highway System; Interstate; US; State; Former; Pre‑1945; Toll; Scenic
← SR 80	→ SR 82

State Road 81 (SR 81) is a state highway linking State Road 20 at Bruce (east of Freeport) with Alabama State Route 87.

== Route description ==
State Road 81 begins at a wye along State Road 20 in Bruce, which is in rural Walton County, The road curves more toward the east through Dismal Swamp and the turn back to the northeast where it runs along the west coast of Buzzards Roost Swamp before crossing a bridge over Seven Runs River. Later it curves to the west before approaching Mossy Bend Road, an old section of the road and then enters Redbay where it curves back toward the north around the termini of two local streets; westbound Rock Hill Road and southbound North Tram Road. After this, the road turns from northeast to straight north before descending towards a valley named Hunter Branch, then ascends from that area to pass by Redbay Cemetery. It then curves around some ponds as it approaches a pair of bridges over Big Branch Creek and Bruce Creek, followed by a blinker-light intersection with the southeastern terminus of CR 183, and later turns straight north long before approaching the southwestern terminus of CR 181 a bi-county road in Walton and Holmes Counties, that leads to Ponce de Leon Springs State Park. North of there, it runs under a moderately sized power line right-of-way, and after the intersection of C.B. Whitehead Road curves slightly to the northeast.

The road crosses the Walton-Holmes County Line on the south side of the intersections of Hogan Drive and L.D. Anderson Road (two dirt roads) and enters the Town of Ponce de Leon on the north side. Despite entering the town limits, the surroundings are still rural, even as it becomes a divided highway and comes across a couple of gas stations as it approaches Interstate 10 at Exit 96, which contains a rest area on the southeast corner of that interchange which is accessible from SR 81 rather than I-10 itself. North of I-10, the road is named Samson Highway. After the divider ends, the road takes a slight curve to the right that ends at a bridge over Mill Creek, then enters "downtown" Ponce de Leon where it meets an at-grade crossing with the CSX P&A Subdivision. After that crossing and the intersections with Maple Loop and Skelton Street, the road curves to the right again over another bridge over Sandy Creek, then turns straight north again. At US 90 SR 81 intersects at an angle, but north of there it has a connecting spur to and from US 90 on the northeast corner, which is the by-product of a former wye. State Road 81 takes a northwest curve at that connecting road, but after leaving the town limits, the road returns to a straight north trajectory. 0.9 miles (1.4 km) north of the intersections with Sandy Creek Road and White Road, the route curves to the northeast, eventually entering Prosperity where it intersects CR 181, essentially reuniting with the route it encountered south of the Walton-Holmes County Line. Northwest of this intersection, CR 181 will enter Leonia, and cross back into Walton County before reaching Darlington. Meanwhile, SR 81 curves from northeast to northwest before the intersection with Bradley Road. It maintains this trajectory as it enters the community of Hobbs Crossroads where it meets the western terminus of CR 160, and then approaches what would seem to be the western terminus of State Road 2 (Hog and Hominy Road). Instead, SR 2 follows SR 81 in an obvious concurrency, which then takes a sharper northwestern curve as it approaches the intersection of CR 185 (Petty X Road), a bi-county road spanning from Glendale in Walton County, and Alabama State Route 27. SR 81 continues northwest through some farmland that's briefly interrupted by a culvert over Hurricane Creek, then rises to approach an intersection with two dirt roads, one of which is partially named after the aforementioned creek. Roughly 0.4 miles (0.64 km) after that intersection, it turns straight north again before the concurrency with SR 2 ends at the blinker-light intersection of CR 2 and CR 2A in Royal Crossroads, and stays at this trajectory permanently. The road takes one last dip into some low-lying forestland before emerging at some sparse farmland, which includes a small fruit and vegetable store on the southbound side. This farmland ends as State Road 81 approaches a wooded embankment along the east bank of Camp Creek before it finally ends at the Florida-Alabama state line, becoming Alabama State Route 87 in Geneva County, Alabama.

== Major intersections ==
County	Location	mi	km	Destinations	Notes
Walton	Bruce	0.000	0.000	SR 20 – Ebro, Freeport	
Walton	Redbay	9.853	15.857	Rock Hill Road	
Walton		13.111	21.100	CR 183 north	
Walton		14.901	23.981	CR 181 north	
Holmes	Ponce de Leon	18.61	29.95	I-10 (SR 8) – Pensacola, Tallahassee	Exit 96 (I-10)
Holmes	Ponce de Leon	19.543	31.451	US 90 (SR 10) – DeFuniak Springs, Westville, Ponce de Leon Springs State Park	
Holmes	Prosperity	28.809	46.364	CR 181	
Holmes	Hobbs Crossroads	33.369	53.702	CR 160 east	
Holmes		34.569	55.633	SR 2 east – Graceville	South end of SR 2 overlap
Holmes		35.605	57.301	CR 185 (Petty Crossroads) – Leonia, Sweet Gum Head	
Holmes	Royals Crossroads	38.287	61.617	CR 2 west / CR 2A east – Darlington, Geneva	North end of SR 2 overlap
Holmes		39.466	63.514	SR 87 north – Samson	Alabama state line
1.000 mi = 1.609 km; 1.000 km = 0.621 mi: Concurrency terminus
