= Ponce de Leon, Florida =

Town in the state of Florida, United States

- Town
- Town of Ponce de Leon
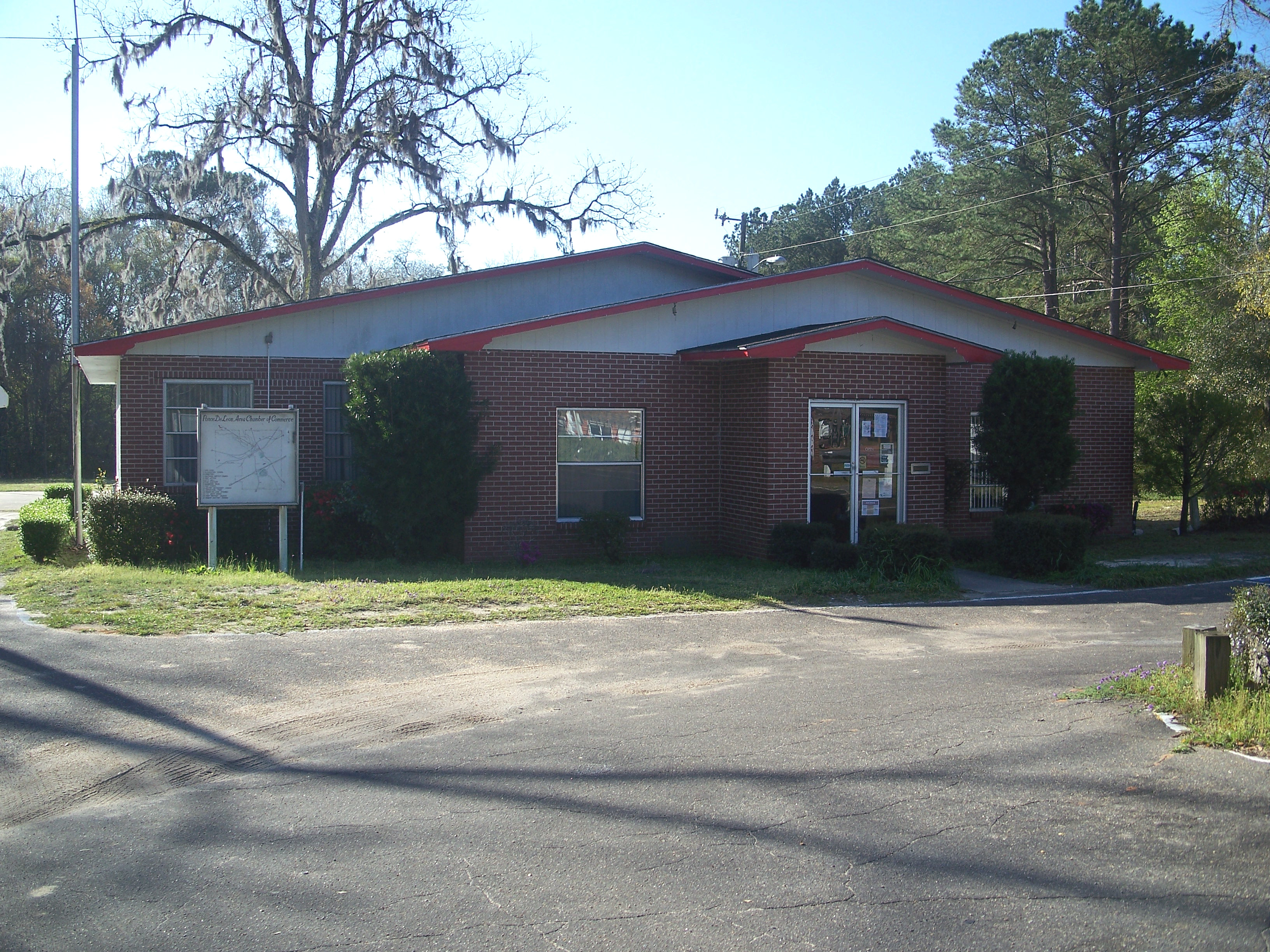
- Ponce de Leon Town Hall
- Motto: "Fountain of Youth for Family Fun"
- Location in Holmes County and the state of Florida
- Coordinates: 30°43′24″N 85°56′15″W
- Country: United States
- State: Florida
- County: Holmes
- Settled: c. 1830
- Incorporated: 1963
- Named after: Juan Ponce de León

Government
  - Type: Mayor-Council
  - Mayor: Shane Busby
  - Councilmembers: Ashley Johnson, Laura Johnson, William Glenister, Marrilyn Haney, Kimberly Mason, and Johnny Sutton
  - Town Clerk: Jessica Harris
  - Town Attorney: Lyndia P. Spears

Area
  - Total: 5.00 sq mi (12.95 km^{2})
  - Land: 4.96 sq mi (12.85 km^{2})
  - Water: 0.039 sq mi (0.10 km^{2})
- Elevation: 62 ft (19 m)

Population (2020)
  - Total: 504
  - Density: 101.6/sq mi (39.23/km^{2})
- Time zone: UTC-6 (Central (CST))
  - Summer (DST): UTC-5 (CDT)
- ZIP code: 32455
- Area code(s): 850, 448
- FIPS code: 12-58175
- GNIS feature ID: 2407146

Ponce de Leon (/ˌpɒns də ˈliːən/ PONSS də LEE-ən) is a town in Holmes County, Florida, United States. The Town of Ponce de Leon was named after Spanish explorer, Juan Ponce de León. It is part of the Florida Panhandle in North Florida. The population was 504 at the 2020 census, down from 598 at the 2010 census.

== Geography ==
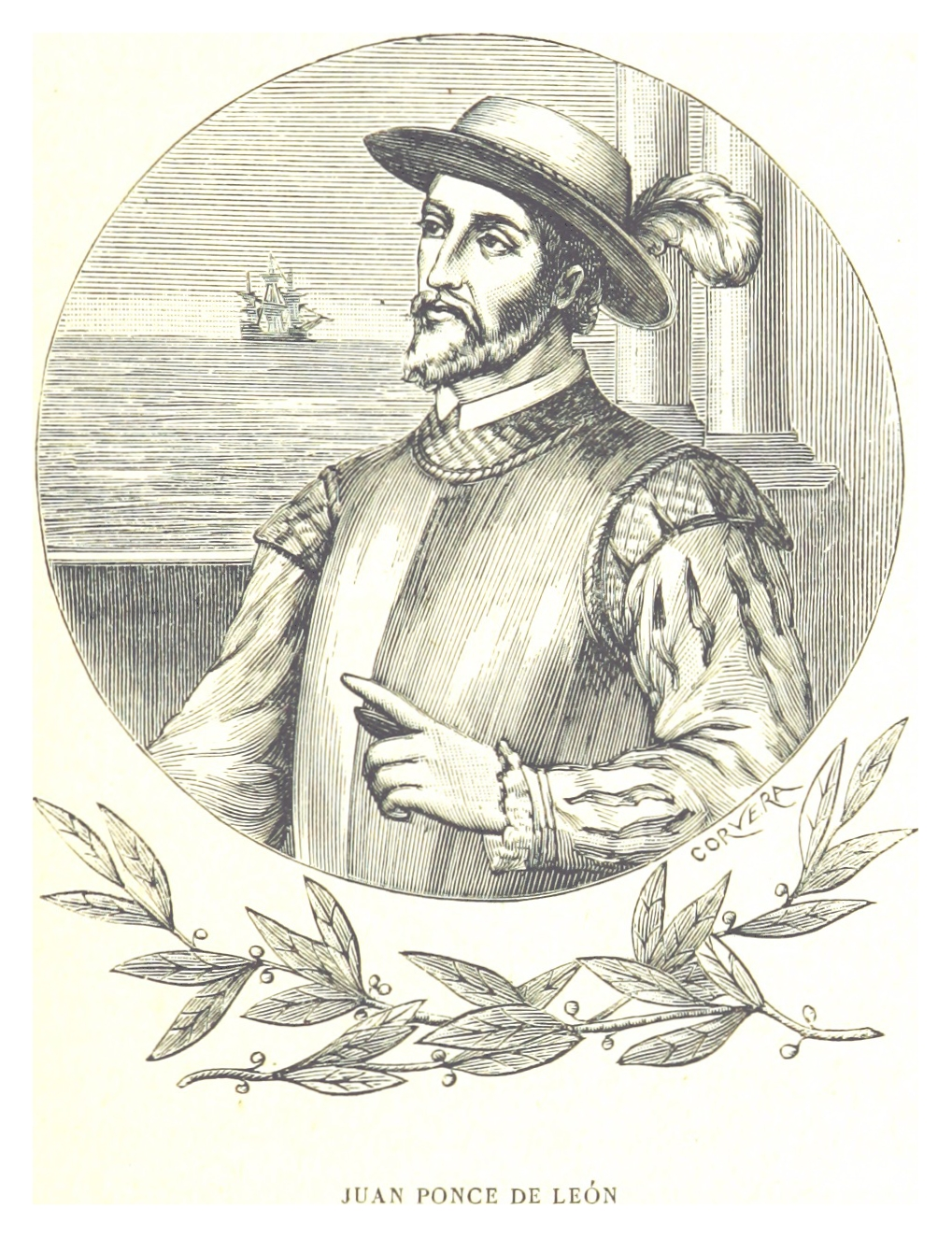
Juan Ponce de León led the first European expedition to Florida.

The Town of Ponce de Leon is located in southwestern Holmes County.

U.S. Route 90 runs through the center of town, leading northeast 17 miles (27 km) to Bonifay, the Holmes County seat, and west 11 miles (18 km) to DeFuniak Springs. Florida State Road 81 crosses US 90 near the center of town, leading north 20 miles (32 km) to the Alabama border and south 19 miles (31 km) to Florida State Road 20 at Bruce. Interstate 10 passes through the southern part of Ponce de Leon, with access from Exit 96 (SR 81). I-10 leads east 107 miles (172 km) to Tallahassee and west 88 miles (142 km) to Pensacola.

According to the United States Census Bureau, the town has a total area of 5.0 square miles (12.9 km^{2}), of which 4.9 square miles (12.8 km^{2}) are land and 0.26 square kilometres (0.1 sq mi), or 0.78%, are water.

The town is in the valley of Sandy Creek, a south-flowing tributary of the Choctawhatchee River. Ponce de Leon Springs State Park is in the southern part of the town, north of I-10, along both sides of Sandy Creek. The entrance is on the eastern side of the park off Ponce de Leon Springs Road.

=== Climate ===
The climate in this area is characterized by hot, humid summers and generally mild winters. According to the Köppen climate classification, the Town of Ponce de Leon has a humid subtropical climate zone (Cfa).

== Demographics ==
Historical population
Census	Pop.	Note	%±
1970	288		—
1980	454		57.6%
1990	406		−10.6%
2000	457		12.6%
2010	598		30.9%
2020	504		−15.7%
U.S. Decennial Census

=== 2010 and 2020 census ===
Ponce de Leon racial composition (Hispanics excluded from racial categories) (NH = Non-Hispanic)
Race	Pop 2010	Pop 2020	% 2010	% 2020
White (NH)	548	472	91.64%	93.65%
Black or African American (NH)	11	2	1.84%	0.40%
Native American or Alaska Native (NH)	6	3	1.00%	0.60%
Asian (NH)	2	2	0.33%	0.40%
Pacific Islander or Native Hawaiian (NH)	1	0	0.17%	0.00%
Some other race (NH)	0	0	0.00%	0.00%
Two or more races/Multiracial (NH)	12	12	2.01%	2.38%
Hispanic or Latino (any race)	18	13	3.01%	2.58%
Total	598	504		

As of the 2020 United States census, there were 504 people, 225 households, and 167 families residing in the town.

As of the 2010 United States census, there were 598 people, 230 households, and 94 families residing in the town.

=== 2000 census ===
As of the census of 2000, there were 457 people, 200 households, and 131 families residing in the town. The population density was 92.3 inhabitants per square mile (35.6/km^{2}). There were 290 housing units at n average density of 47.0 per square mile (18.1/km^{2}). The racial makeup of the town was 91.47% White, 3.06% African American, 2.41% Native American, 1.53% from other races, and 1.53% from two or more races. Hispanic or Latino of any race were 2.84% of the population.

In 2000, there were 200 households, out of which 30.0% had children under the age of 18 living with them, 48.5% were married couples living together, 11.5% had a female householder with no husband present, and 34.5% were non-families. 29.5% of all households were made up of individuals, and 14.5% had someone living alone who was 65 years of age or older. The average household size was 2.29 and the average family size was 2.82.

In 2000, in the town, the population was spread out, with 24.9% under the age of 18, 6.3% from 18 to 24, 24.9% from 25 to 44, 28.0% from 45 to 64, and 15.8% who were 65 years of age or older. The median age was 40 years. For every 100 females, there were 94.5 males. For every 100 females age 18 and over, there were 92.7 males.

In 2000, the median income for a household in the town was $25,521, and the median income for a family was $33,250. Males had a median income of $26,339 versus $13,750 for females. The per capita income for the town was $14,673. About 16.9% of families and 19.3% of the population were below the poverty line, including 22.2% of those under age 18 and 19.4% of those age 65 or over.

== See also ==
- Ponce de Leon Springs State Park
