= Joseph Dudley Heath =

American politician

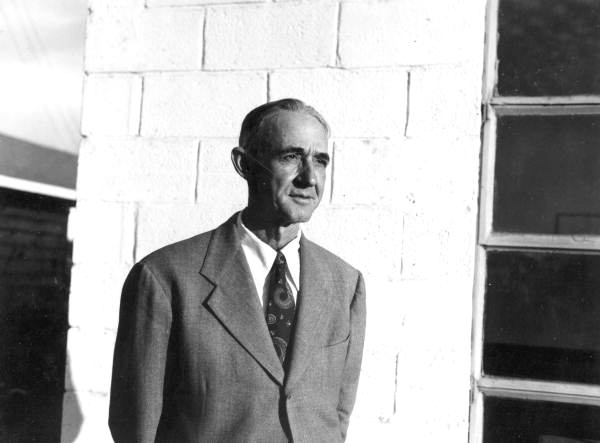
- Heath in 1949

Member of the Florida House of Representatives from Holmes County
- In office 1949

Personal details
- Party: Democratic

Joseph Dudley Heath was an American politician. He served as a Democratic member of the Florida House of Representatives.
