= Sam Story =

Sam Story, also named Timpoochee Kinnard, was Chief of the Walton County, Florida, band of Euchee (Yuchi) Indians in the early 19th century, who occupied the lands on and to the west of the Choctawhatchee River. His parents were Timothy Kinnard, a white man of Scottish descent, and an unknown Yuchi woman. The chief was a well-known figure in the Florida Panhandle and was highly respected by whites, who migrated to the area in ever-increasing numbers following the acquisition of Florida by the United States from Spain in 1821.

In the spring of 1820, Neil McLennan and brother-in-law Daniel Campbell moved their families from Richmond County, North Carolina, to Walton County, Florida, where they were invited by Chief Sam Story to settle on lands adjoining his on Bruce Creek in the Euchee Valley. These Scots first camped near Pensacola and met the Chief in town when he was there trading for supplies. After becoming the first white settlers in Walton County, they were soon joined by other relatives and friends, drawn by the fertility of the soil and the unspoiled wilderness.

However, by 1832, other white people had moved into the area and were wantonly destroying the wildlife as well as starting forest fires. Both the McLennans and old Chief Story decided to depart for better places; the Chief sent his sons to scout for lands to the east, while many of the McLennans and their kin decided to head west by boat, and became prominent early settlers of what later was named McLennan County, Texas.

Chief Sam Story died just before his tribe moved, and is buried south of the fork of Bruce Creek and the Choctawhatchee River. After three weeks of mourning, about 500 Euchees went southward to the coast of the Gulf of Mexico, embarking on their canoes at Story's Landing, near the burial site of the chief, southeast of the modern community of Red Bay in Walton County. Story's Landing is marked by a man-made marker in the Choctawhatchee River at N30° 35.979, W83° 54.911. They then traveled eastward, both by land and by water. Nothing further was heard of them. Some may have eventually settled with the Seminole Indians in South Florida. It is definitely known, however, that the United States Army forced some of the Walton County Euchees and several other small West Florida bands to relocate west of the Mississippi River.

Chief Sam Story had three sons, Jim Crow, Swift Hunter and Sleeping Fire, and three daughters, Leaping Water, Quiet Water and Round Water. Jim Crow, and perhaps others of the tribe, left numerous descendants, some of them called Dominickers, in Walton, Holmes, and Washington counties.

== Sources ==
- John Love McKinnon, History of Walton County. Atlanta: Byrd Printing, 1911. Electronic version created 2002 by the State University System of Florida, pp. 62–66, 94–97.
- E. W. Carswell, Holmesteading: The History of Holmes County, Florida, published by the author at Chipley, Florida, 1986 (available in print only)
- Clayton Gillis Metcalf, Scots and Their Kin, Volume I: Gilli(e)s, Padgett, Arrant, McQuagge, McLennan, published by the author at Enterprise, Alabama, 1984 (available in print only)
