= Bethlehem High School =

Bethlehem High School may refer to:

== Canada ==
- Bethlehem High School (Saskatoon)

== New Zealand ==
- Bethlehem School, a state primary school in Bethlehem, New Zealand

== United States ==
- Bethlehem High School (Bonifay, Florida), see Holmes District School Board
- Bethlehem High School (Kentucky), Bardstown, Kentucky
- Bethlehem Central High School, Delmar, New York
- Bethlehem High School (Pennsylvania), replaced in 1922 by Liberty High School
