= Ponce de Leon High School =

Ponce de Leon High School may refer to:

- Ponce de Leon High School, predecessor of Coral Gables Senior High School
- Ponce de Leon High School in Leon, Florida overseen by the Holmes District School Board
