= Gronocarus inornatus =

Scientific classification
- Kingdom: Animalia
- Phylum: Arthropoda
- Clade: Pancrustacea
- Class: Insecta
- Order: Coleoptera
- Suborder: Polyphaga
- Infraorder: Scarabaeiformia
- Family: Scarabaeidae
- Tribe: Melolonthini
- Genus: Gronocarus
- Species: G. inornatus

Binomial name
- Gronocarus inornatus Skelley, 2005

Species of beetle

Gronocarus inornatus, the lobeless spiny burrowing beetle, is a species of scarab beetle in the family Scarabaeidae. It is found in North America, where it is found east of the Choctawhatchee River in the Florida panhandle, west of the Apalachicola River and along barrier islands to Panacea.

== Description ==
Adults reach a length of about 12 mm (0.47 in). They have a moderately elongate body. The upper surface of the body is glabrous, shining and brown, with the base of the head and clypeus darker.
