= HDSB =

HDSB may refer to:

- Halton District School Board, in Ontario, Canada
- Holmes District School Board, in Florida, United States
