= Holmes County School District =

Holmes County School District is a name shared by several school districts in the United States

- Holmes County School District (Florida) (see List of school districts in Florida#H)
- Holmes County School District (Mississippi)
