= Ponce de Leon Springs =

Ponce de Leon Springs can refer to:

- Ponce de Leon Springs (Atlanta), former springs in Atlanta, Georgia
- Ponce de Leon Springs State Park, a park in the Florida panhandle
