= Keith Cabin =

Historic house in Florida, United States

- U.S. National Register of Historic Places
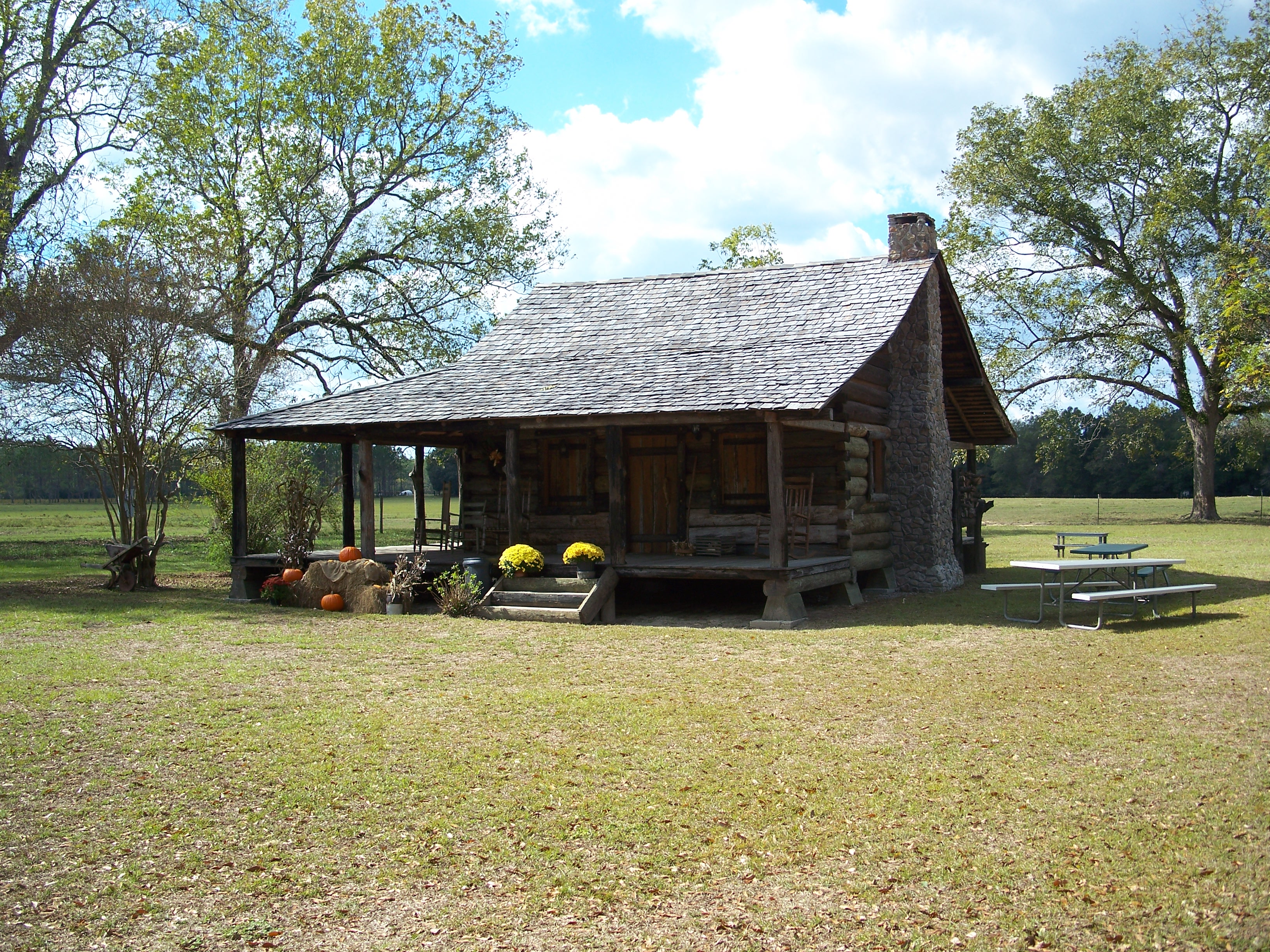

- Location within Florida
- Location: Pittman, Holmes County, Florida
- Coordinates: 30°56′13″N 85°49′26″W
- Built: 1886
- NRHP reference No.: 00001281
- Added to NRHP: 2 November 2000

The Keith Cabin is a historic house located at 1320 CR 179, northwest of Bonifay and west of Bethlehem in Holmes County, Florida. It was built in 1886. It was deemed significant "as an excellent and rare example of a 19th century log cabin built with a 'Louisiana' roof. It retains a high level of its architectural integrity, and displays excellent workmanship."

It is a one-story, one-room structure upon a split log pier foundation. It has verandas around three sides.

It was added to the U.S. National Register of Historic Places on November 2, 2000.
