= Two-Toed Tom =

Legendary alligator in the Southern US

Two-Toed Tom is a legendary cryptid in the Southern United States who terrorized swamp residents in Florida and Alabama. The name originates from the legendary alligator having lost all but two toes on one or more feet to a steel trap.

== Origins ==
The story of Two-Toed Tom originated in the 1920s, at least as early as 1922, according to an anecdote by Esto, Florida councilman Ralph Dupree, born in 1912, who said that he had heard the story "since he was 10 years old". One of the earliest written accounts can be traced to the 1934 book Stars Fell on Alabama, by Carl Carmer. In the book, the story of Two-Toed Tom, often referred to simply as Two-Toe or Red-Eye, refers to a red-eyed, 14-foot alligator who would regularly eat farmers livestock as well as men and women, the latter of which he was also said to have raped before eating. The story continues to tell of multiple failed attempts to kill the alligator, including an ex-military sharpshooter who spent over a week in a hunting blind, waiting for the creature, and another incident where the alligator was chased into a pond by farmer Pap Haines, into which 15 syrup buckets of dynamite were lit and thrown into, in an unsuccessful attempt to kill Two-Toe. The story ends with it being mentioned the gator was said to have made his way down to Florida, though the narrator, an old man named Gilmore, believed he'd be back to Alabama eventually.

Other sources attest that Two-Toed Tom, after leaving Alabama, took up residence in the Sand Hammock Lake, between Esto, Florida and Noma, Florida. In a chapter dedicated to the legend in the book Holmesteading by E.W. Carswell, it's described that the creature continued to frequently eat livestock, and would also bellow in response to the whistle at the Alabama-Florida Lumber Company mill in Noma. Further failed attempts at killing Two-Toed Tom are described here as well, with a group of local boys shooting at it with .22 caliber rifles and shotguns, to no effect.

Two-Toed Tom arises again in 1972, when an article in the Pensacola News Journal reported that two-toed tracks had been found on Boynton Island, near the community of Red Head, Florida.

== Two-Toed Tom Festival ==
Starting in 1987, a festival has been held in Esto, Florida dedicated to Two-Toed Tom, however as of 2019, its future has been called into question, due to a lack of support.

== In popular culture ==
Two-Toed Tom is mentioned briefly in Go Set a Watchman by Harper Lee.

Two-Toed Tom is featured in the video game South of Midnight, where Hazel and Catfish encounter him while searching for Hazel's mother. He is depicted as an enormous albino alligator with a small island attached to his back. Hazel later finds out that Tom was the pet of Jolene's father, Old Farmer Swope, who had been mistreating him through starvation, which lead to Jolene to free the hungry reptile by ringing a dinner bell that her father used to tease Tom, which leads to Swope getting eaten by the starving gator. Tom later stumbles upon a pig farm, where he slaughtered every single livestock to fill his empty stomach, thus transforming him into the ravenous beast he is now lurking in the waters of Prospero.
