= Gronocarus autumnalis =

Scientific classification
- Kingdom: Animalia
- Phylum: Arthropoda
- Clade: Pancrustacea
- Class: Insecta
- Order: Coleoptera
- Suborder: Polyphaga
- Infraorder: Scarabaeiformia
- Family: Scarabaeidae
- Tribe: Melolonthini
- Genus: Gronocarus
- Species: G. autumnalis

Binomial name
- Gronocarus autumnalis Schaeffer, 1927

Synonyms
- Gronocarus multispinosus Howden, 1961

Species of beetle

Gronocarus autumnalis, the lobed spiny burrowing beetle, is a species of scarab beetle in the family Scarabaeidae. It is found in North America, where it found west of the Choctawhatchee River in the Florida panhandle and in coastal areas of Alabama and Mississippi.

== Description ==
Adults reach a length of about 9.7–16 mm (0.38–0.63 in).
