= Ponce de Leon Springs State Park =

Florida State Park in Holmes County

Ponce de León Springs State Park
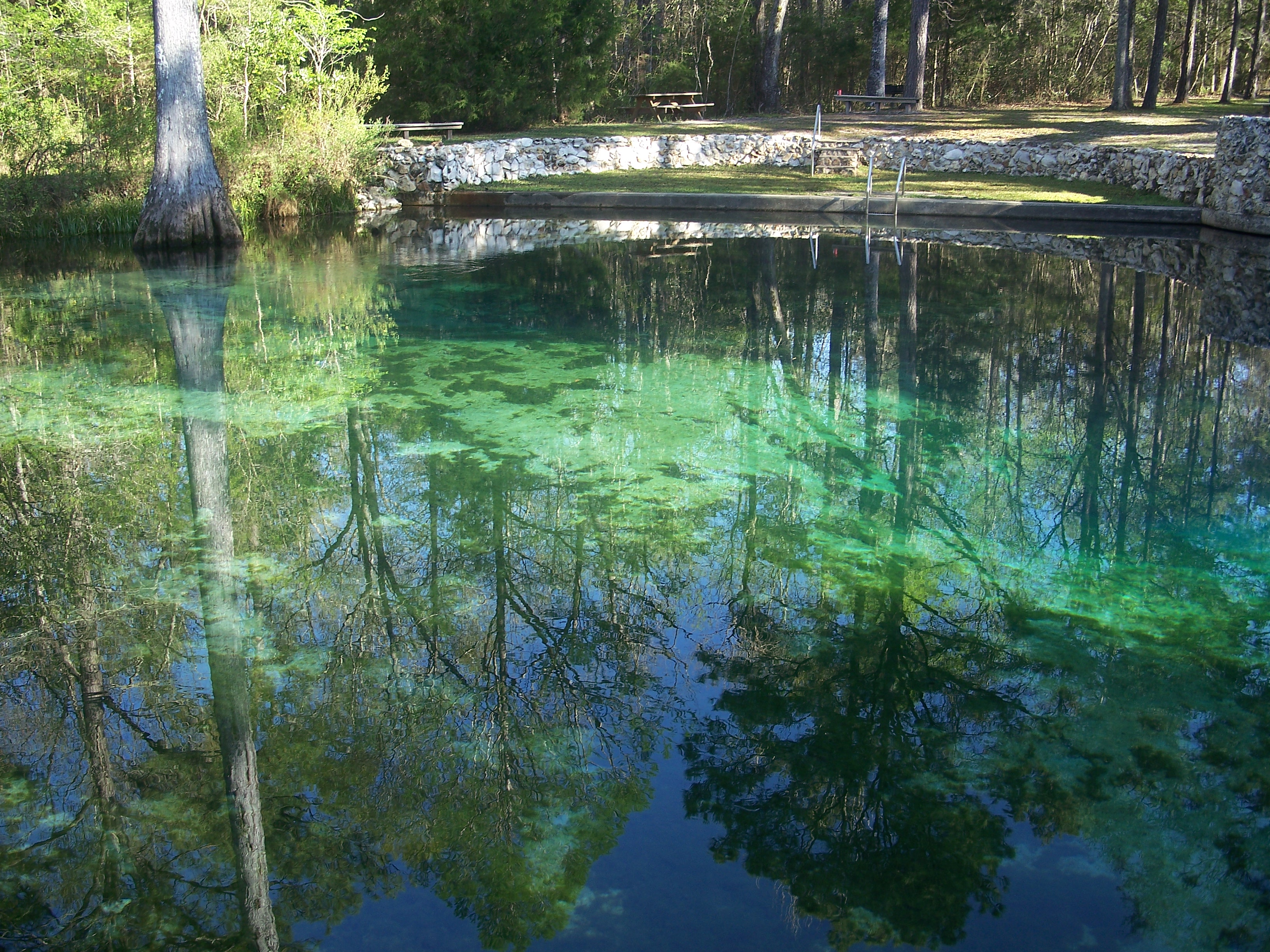
- The springs

- Location within Florida Location within the United States
- Interactive map of Ponce de León Springs State Park
- Location: Holmes County, Florida, United States
- Nearest city: DeFuniak Springs, Florida
- Coordinates: 30°42′29″N 85°55′37″W
- Area: 380.84 acres (154.12 ha)
- Established: September 4, 1970; 56 years ago
- Governing body: Florida Department of Environmental Protection

Ponce de Leon Springs State Recreation Area is a Florida State Park in Holmes County, Florida, United States, located in the town of Ponce de Leon. The initial acquisition of the park on September 4, 1970, used funds from the Land Acquisition Trust Fund for the stated purpose of developing, operating, and maintaining the property. The plan was to develop the park for outdoor recreation, historic conservation, and to offer abundant opportunities for nature appreciation and wildlife viewing. Today, it grants park-goers the opportunities to swim in the spring and hike along the park's nature trails.

The park's significance lies in the Ponce de Leon Spring, its most distinctive feature, which is fed by the Floridan Aquifer. The spring was named in honor of Juan Ponce de León, an explorer who, in 1513, led the first Spanish expedition to Florida. It is rumored that the objective of Ponce de Leon's expedition was to search for a spring that, according to a Taino Indian legend, would restore youth to those who bathed in their waters. The legend contributes to the Ponce de Leon Springs’ unofficial title, “The Fountain of Youth”.

Although named after the Spanish explorer, the springs were previously inhabited by a group of Native Americans with a rich history of activity within the area.

The park has a unique ecology, flora, fauna, and is covered by specific conservancy and protective efforts. It is also linked to the Civil War.

== History ==
=== Indigenous inhabitants ===
Although named after the Spanish colonial explorer Ponce de León, long before the Europeans arrived in Florida, the springs were previously inhabited by a group of Native Americans known as the Chatot and Chisca.

It is believed that the Chisca were once the Yuchi. Hailing from Tennessee, the Yuchi left the Appalachian Highlands due to colonial wars in the 1650s. With a little record of them afterwards, it is believed that the tribe split into distinct groups; those that settled near the Choctawhatchee River became the Chisca, who are now extinct.

The Chatot lived west of the Apalachicola River and Chipola River basins. They once had territory spanning from the Chattahoochee River to the Choctawhatchee River. The Chatot were fierce defenders of their land, and are mentioned in a 1639 letter from the governor of Florida, in which he expresses surprise about a peace agreement between the Chatot and another tribe as "[the Chatot] never maintained peace with anybody".

=== The Civil War ===
Following the migration of Spanish settlers to Florida, the springs quickly generated considerable attraction. The clear waters were popular for fishing, drinking, and swimming. In 1840, a log hotel was established, drawing several families into this area. These early settlers were harassed and traumatized by the brutal activities of deserter gangs during the Civil War.

On September 24, 1864, 700 Union soldiers briefly paused at the springs on their way to the Battle of Marianna. The soldiers, on a raid led by Brigadier General Alexander Asboth, destroyed the hotel and looted neighboring homes. Records indicate that, following the raid, the Union force sustained its first loss near the park and in the Ponce de León area. Also in the vicinity of the park, it is reported that Private Joseph Williams of Company H, the 86th U.S. Colored Infantry, was mortally wounded in an accidental shooting and left bleeding “in the lines of the enemy at Big Sandy Creek”.

== Ecology ==
Ponce De León Springs comprises 386.94 acres of land in Holmes County and Walton County, Florida. The second-magnitude spring produces about 14 million gallons of water daily, outputting a 350 ft. spring-run stream. The water is approximately 20 ft. deep at the spring's head, where a vent concentrates groundwater discharge to the surface. Like other parts of the Floridan aquifer, the water remains a constant 68 °F.

The springs' topography ranges from sloping to level, with streams collecting their drainage from the slopes, these stream systems of the Choctawhatchee River, River Valley Province, and the Coastal Lowlands Province. The park is also home to underlying Ocala limestone.

=== The Floridan Aquifer ===
The water in the springs emerges from the Floridan aquifer system, one of the most productive sources of groundwater in the United States and a major source of supply for agricultural, industrial, and rural uses. This system is a part of the principal artesian aquifer, "the largest, oldest, and deepest aquifer in the southeastern U.S". The aquifer spans 100,000 mi^{2}, across four states in the southeast U.S.

==== Ocala Limestone ====
The aquifer system contains 3,500 ft. of limestone and dolomite. Due to limestone's porous nature, its presence near the surface, along with Florida's rapid population growth, results in groundwater resources being highly susceptible to contamination.

Discovered in its namesake, Ocala, Florida, Ocala Limestone is "soft, white, porous, and apparently very pure" when found in Florida, but can be "very fossiliferous" in other areas.

=== Flora ===
The state park protects the habitat of four rare species of pitcher plants—the parrot, purple, red, and trumpet-leaf—along the wetland areas. It also protects the habitats of other plant species, including the flame azalea, the mountain laurel, and the longleaf pine, while simultaneously preserving 40+ acres of historic turpentine woodlands. Plants found in the upland portions include rhododendron, red chokeberry, milkweed, hickory, huckleberry, blazing star, aster, oaks, pines, and blueberry.

Ponce De León Springs served 111.775 acres of exotic plant species from 2001 to 2011, some invasive. The gravest incidents of invasive exotic flora, including cogon grass, wisteria, Chinese tallow trees, and Chinese privet, occurred around 2006 in the northern area of the park, but continuous treatments quelled the infestation. The effects of a later infestation of the Japanese climbing fern in the southern region of the park were minimized by swift action from park staff.

=== Fauna ===
The park is home to a variety of animals, including the gopher tortoise, turkey, fox, white-tailed deer, beaver, bobcat, otter, and various native and migratory birds. Fish species include catfish, largemouth bass, chain pickerel, and panfish.

Some species labeled “nuisance animals” are the armadillo, feral hog, and American alligators. When rooting by armadillos or feral hogs is spotted on park property, park staff may start trapping those animals, as this rooting can damage restored flora-filled slopes. Alligators may prove to be a nuisance if they have frequent contact with park visitors. Signage in the park notifies the public of the alligators’ presence, the dangers of feeding them, and other safety concerns.

=== Conservancy ===
The park contains a multitude of species classed by the Florida Natural Areas Inventory as critically imperiled, or listed by the U.S. Fish and Wildlife Service, Florida Fish and Wildlife Conservation Commission, or the Florida Department of Agriculture and Consumer Services as endangered, threatened or of special concern. Many of the park's plant species, such as pitcher plants, orchids and, butterworts, can be considered imperiled species, as although they were not recorded prior to the restoration of this natural park community, have in many ways recovered due to recent restoration efforts. Restoration efforts are crucial to the reintroduction and/or survival of these particular species, with appropriate fire and hydrological regimes pertinent to restoration efforts.

For example, the Red Pitcher plant was reintroduced to the park in 2010 after multiple active efforts to locate it where it was previously recorded to exist, and its reintroduced vitality was only made possible through continued restoration of the seepage slope natural community. Many bog species within the park continue to increase in population as restoration efforts have helped expand their habitats.

=== Protection ===
Ponce de León Springs State Park falls under the protection of Florida's statutes on state parks and preserves. The parks' flora and fauna are protected from disruption by Statue 258.008, which deems the following a second-degree misdemeanor if done without permission:

(a) Cutting, carving, injuring, mutilating, moving, displacing, or breaking off any water-bottom formation or coral.

(b) Capturing, trapping, or injuring a wild animal.

(c) Collecting plant or animal specimens.

(d) Leaving the designated public roads in a vehicle.

(e) Hunting.

== Accessibility ==
Access to Ponce De León Springs is from north of Interstate 10 in Ponce de León, Florida, off Holmes County Road 181A, which is accessed by way of U.S. 90. There are two self-guided nature tours—Spring Run and Sandy Creek—as well as seasonal park ranger-guided walks. These tours are bike accessible, as well as walkable.

== See also ==
- Juan Ponce de León
- The Fountain of Youth
- Spring (hydrology)
- Floridan Aquifer
