= USS Bloomer =

Gunboat of the United States Navy

History

United States
- Launched: 1856
- Acquired: January 24, 1863
- Commissioned: January 24, 1863
- Fate: Sold, September 22, 1865

General characteristics
- Displacement: 130 tons
- Propulsion: steam engine; stern wheel-propelled
- Complement: 49
- Armament: one 32-pounder gun; one 12-pounder rifled gun

USS Bloomer was a stern-wheel steamer acquired by the Union Navy during the American Civil War. She was used by the Union Navy as a gunboat with orders to patrol navigable waterways of the Confederacy to prevent the South from trading with other countries.

== Service history ==
Bloomer—a stern-wheel steamer built in 1856 at New Albany, Indiana—was laid up at the outbreak of the Civil War in the Choctawhatchee River in Alabama, about a mile south of Geneva, Alabama, by her owner, a loyal Union man. On December 27, 1862, a joint expedition composed of officers and men of Potomac and troops of the 91st New York State Volunteers, led by Lieutenant James H. Stewart took possession of her and delivered her to the Pensacola Navy Yard where she was repaired and armed. A small crew was placed on board and, on January 24, 1863, Acting Ensign Edwin Crissey assumed command. The ship was put in operation without being sent to an admiralty court to be libelled. Although she spent most of her naval career operating in the West Gulf Blockading Squadron, her most notable service occurred in December 1863 during a brief tour of duty with the East Gulf Blockading Squadron. This operation in St. Andrew's Bay, Florida—in which she was assisted by her tender, the sloop Caroline, and the bark Restless—resulted in the destruction of 380 different salt works and of much of the town of St. Andrew's. Her commanding officer received high praise for Bloomer's part in the successful accomplishment of this mission.

Near the very end of 1863, Bloomer was at last ordered to the prize court of New Orleans, Louisiana, to be libelled. The final decree in the case, rendered on January 4, 1865, declared this was not a case of "prize" but of "salvage". Early in 1865, she was finally purchased by the United States Navy and continued on duty on the coast of Florida in the vicinity of Pensacola, Florida. In June 1865 she sank in East Pass, Santa Rosa Island, Florida. After the wreck was raised, it was sold on September 22, 1865, to S. P. Griffin & Co., of Woolsey, Florida. Redocumented as Emma on April 5, 1866, the vessel served a private owner until 1868 when she was sold to a foreign purchaser and disappeared from American shipping records. The Official Records of the Union and Confederate Navies of the War of the Rebellion (ORN) lists the Bloomer both as a sidewheeler and, later, as a sternwheeler. One of the persons from Geneva who assisted in the raid was a pilot named Jones, who is not otherwise identified; however, records of the ORN show that a Thomas G. Jones was, at one time, in command of the Bloomer, after she was captured—perhaps in reward for his services.
