= Holmes County High School =

Location
- 825 West Highway 90; Bonifay, Florida 32425; United States; 30°47′41″N 85°41′00″W

Information
- Type: Public
- School district: Holmes District Schools
- Principal: Laurence Pender
- Teaching staff: 27.00 (on FTE basis)
- Grades: 9-12
- Enrollment: 485 (2023-2024)
- Student to teacher ratio: 17.96
- Colors: Navy Blue and Vegas Gold
- Nickname: Blue Devils
- Team name: Blue Devils
- Website: hchs.hdsb.org

Holmes County High School is a public school on State Road 90 in Bonifay, Florida, in Holmes County. As of November 23, 2010, there were 515 students enrolled there, with 9th grade having the largest number of students (165). It is a part of Holmes District Schools. In 1985, the school was one of six in Florida that were all-white. In 2025 the student body was about 86 percent white and a little more than half listed as economically disadvantaged.

== Faculty and staff ==
- Laurence Pender: Principal
- Mandi Boyd: Vice Principal

== Athletics ==
The girls' basketball team won a 1A state championship. In 2025, Kolton "Ty" Russ was promoted from defensive coordinator to head football coach.

== Extracurricular groups ==
Students who attend HCHS are able to join several different social groups, including: Future Business Leaders of America (FBLA), Family Career Community Leaders of America (FCCLA), Student Government Association (SGA), The American Key Club, Alpha Tri Hi Y, Future Christians of America (FCA), Color/Winter Guard, Basketball, Baseball/Softball, Volleyball, Cheerleading, HCHS Drama, HCHS Chorus, Varsity Football, Junior Varsity Football, AJROTC, The Blue Pride Band, Track.

=== Homecoming and homecoming week ===
For Homecoming Week, the students and faculty of HCHS use the days to "pep up" the team by having specific "special" days, where the students and faculty dress as something oriented with that specific day, for example, "Welcome to the Jungle Day", where one would dress up as something from the jungle or as something wild, such as a rock star or cave people.

During the week, students get together within their own grade levels, participate in mini games, and Produce a skit that will be judged (normally by school officials) to get numerous points that traditionally skyrocket a classes points up and in turn, putting them ahead of the other classmen.

At the end of the week, on Friday, the school has one final Pep Rally for seventh period, cheering the team on and wishing them their best. During this extended rally, the students produce "skits" where they show the team, being the Bonifay Blue Devils, defeating the opposite team. The HCHS Football team has their game with whoever they are meant to be facing in the evening, and after the game, is the Homecoming Dance. The game begins normally at around 7 pm, and ends shortly before the dance at the school, which normally begins at 9 pm and ends at 11 pm.

For Homecoming 2010, the class of 2013 had their own slogan, "One and Done". The phrase was created because the class had only one point the entire week, only to come to a tragic end on Friday, November 5, when they came in second place for their skit, giving them 6 points.

=== HCHS Drama ===
The HCHS Drama group produces at least two plays every year, a winter/Christmas-oriented play in December, an annual chorus performance called "Decades Of Music" in March, and another normally a musical, in May. Recently in the last few years, plays that the Drama Group have produced are as follows and have all been directed by Ricky Ward:

- December 2006: Bah Humbug!
- May 2007: Bye Bye Birdie
- December 2007: The Grinch
- January 2008: You're A Good Man, Charlie Brown
- May 2008: Grease
- September 2008: The Guys
- December 2008: The Best Christmas Pageant Ever
- May 2009: Into the Woods
- December 2009: Miracle on 34th Street
- May 2010: Back to the 80s: The Totally Awesome Musical
- October 2010: Pump Boys & Dinettes
- December 2010: The Miracle Worker
- March 2011: 5 Year Reunion- All the musicals for the last five years with the original casts for a one-night-only performance. Plays taking place were Bye Bye Birdie, You're A Good Man, Charlie Brown, Grease, Into the Woods, and Back to the 80's, with a sneak peek of Thoroughly Modern Millie (one night only).
- May 2011: Thoroughly Modern Millie
- December 2011: Smokey Joe's Café
- March 2012: Decades of Music
- May 2012: Footloose
- December 2012: The Importance of Being Earnest
- March 2013: Decades of Music
- May 2013: Happy Days
- December 2013: The Sound of Music
- March 2014: Decades of Music
- May 2014: CATS
- January 2015: Our Town
- March 2015: Decades of Music
- May 2015: The Drowsy Chaperone
- December 2015: Smoke on the Mountain
- March 2016: Decades of Music
- May 2016: The Little Mermaid
- February 2017: Ring of Fire
- May 2017: Decades of Music
- December 2017: A Chorus Line
- February 2018: Ring of Fire (Encore)
- March 2018: Decades of Music
- May 2018: Bye Bye Birdie
- December 2018: Appointment with Death *Canceled due to Hurricane
- February 2019: RED
- March 2019: Decades of Music
- May 2019: Into the Woods
- December 2019: Elf the Musical

== See also ==
- List of high schools in Florida
