= Westville, Florida =

Town in the state of Florida, United States

- Town
- Location in Holmes County and the state of Florida
- Coordinates: 30°45′44″N 85°50′52″W
- Country: United States
- State: Florida
- County: Holmes
- Settled: 1891
- Incorporated: 1970

Government
  - Type: Mayor-Council
  - Mayor: Stephen L. Herrington III
  - Councilmembers: Susan Bergeron, Brittney Simmons, BJ Taunton, and Samanatha Webster
  - Town Clerk: Tammy Bowers

Area
  - Total: 7.48 sq mi (19.37 km^{2})
  - Land: 7.22 sq mi (18.69 km^{2})
  - Water: 0.26 sq mi (0.68 km^{2})
- Elevation: 49 ft (15 m)

Population (2020)
  - Total: 261
  - Density: 36.2/sq mi (13.96/km^{2})
- Time zone: UTC-6 (Central (CST))
  - Summer (DST): UTC-5 (CDT)
- ZIP code: 32464
- Area code(s): 850, 448
- FIPS code: 12-76975
- GNIS feature ID: 2406872

Westville is a town in Holmes County, Florida, United States. Westville is part of the Florida Panhandle in North Florida. As of the 2020 census, the town had a population of 261, down from 289 at the 2010 census. From 2010 to 2020, Westville's population growth percentage was -9.7%.

== Geography ==
The approximate coordinates for the Town of Westville is located in southern Holmes County on the west side of the Choctawhatchee River. To the east across the river is the town of Caryville in Washington County.

U.S. Route 90 passes through Westville, leading east through Caryville 11 miles (18 km) to Bonifay, the Holmes County seat, and west 18 miles (29 km) to DeFuniak Springs. Interstate 10 passes through the southern part of the town limits, but the closest access is from Exit 104 in Caryville.

According to the United States Census Bureau, Westville has a total area of 7.5 square miles (19.4 km^{2}), of which 7.2 square miles (18.7 km^{2}) are land and 0.3 square miles (0.7 km^{2}), or 3.53%, are water.

=== Climate ===
The climate in this area is characterized by hot, humid summers and generally mild winters. According to the Köppen climate classification, the Town of Westville has a humid subtropical climate zone (Cfa).

== Demographics ==
Historical population
Census	Pop.	Note	%±
1980	343		—
1990	257		−25.1%
2000	221		−14.0%
2010	289		30.8%
2020	261		−9.7%
U.S. Decennial Census

=== 2010 and 2020 census ===
Westville racial composition (Hispanics excluded from racial categories) (NH = Non-Hispanic)
Race	Pop 2010	Pop 2020	% 2010	% 2020
White (NH)	274	247	94.81%	94.64%
Black or African American (NH)	1	0	0.35%	0.00%
Native American or Alaska Native (NH)	0	0	0.00%	0.00%
Asian (NH)	0	1	0.00%	0.38%
Pacific Islander or Native Hawaiian (NH)	0	0	0.00%	0.00%
Some other race (NH)	0	0	0.00%	0.00%
Two or more races/Multiracial (NH)	9	9	3.11%	3.45%
Hispanic or Latino (any race)	5	4	1.73%	1.53%
Total	289	261	100.00%	100.00%

As of the 2020 United States census, there were 261 people, 137 households, and 97 families residing in the town.

For the period 2011-2015, the estimated median annual income for a household in the town was $34,375, and the median income for a family was $38,750.

As of the 2010 United States census, there were 289 people, 103 households, and 91 families residing in the town.

Of the 110 households in 2010, 37.3% had children under the age of 18 living with them, 55.5% were headed by married couples living together, 11.8% had a female householder with no husband present, and 26.4% were non-families. 20.0% of all households were made up of individuals, and 11.8% were someone living alone who was 65 years of age or older. The average household size was 2.63, and the average family size was 3.04. There were 137 housing units, of which 80.3% were occupied.

In 2010, 26.0% of the town's population were under the age of 18, 8.6% were from age 18 to 24, 25.9% were from 25 to 44, 23.5% were from 45 to 64, and 15.9% were 65 years of age or older. The median age was 38.1 years. For every 100 females, there were 92.7 males. For every 100 females age 18 and over, there were 103.8 males.

=== 2000 census ===
As of the census of 2000, there were 221 people, 94 households, and 64 families residing in the town. The population density was 30.4 people per square mile (11.7/km^{2}). There were 107 housing units at an average density of 14.7/sq mi (5.7/km^{2}). The racial makeup of the town was 98.64% White, 0.45% Asian, and 0.90% from two or more races. Hispanic or Latino of any race were 2.26% of the population.

In 2000, there were 94 households out of which 30.9% had children under the age of 18 living with them, 50.0% were married couples living together, 13.8% had a female householder with no husband present, and 31.9% were non-families. 29.8% of all households were made up of individuals and 14.9% had someone living alone who was 65 years of age or older. The average household size was 2.35 and the average family size was 2.91.

In 2000, in the town, the population was spread out with 24.0% under the age of 18, 10.4% from 18 to 24, 27.1% from 25 to 44, 23.5% from 45 to 64, and 14.9% who were 65 years of age or older. The median age was 35 years. For every 100 females there were 82.6 males. For every 100 females age 18 and over, there were 78.7 males.

In 2000, the median income for a household in the town was $27,000, and the median income for a family was $34,375. Males had a median income of $25,625 versus $20,500 for females. The per capita income for the town was $11,415. About 9.2% of families and 13.9% of the population were below the poverty line, including 9.5% of those under the age of eighteen and 22.2% of those sixty five or over.

== Notable people ==
- Laura Ingalls Wilder, American author
- Almanzo Wilder, husband of Laura Ingalls Wilder
- Rose Wilder Lane, daughter of Laura
