= Georgia Boy Williams =

American politician

B. D. "Georgia Boy" Williams
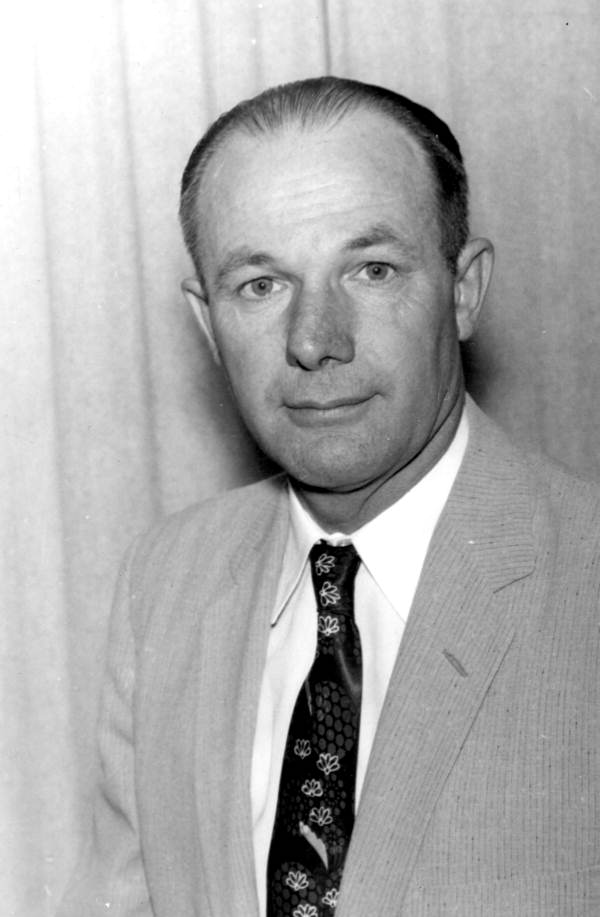

Member of the Florida House of Representatives from the Columbia County district
- In office 1956–1959

Personal details
- Born: October 23, 1908 Bonifay, Florida
- Died: November 9, 1990 (aged 82) Columbia County, Florida
- Party: Democratic

Bascom Delois Williams (October 23, 1908 – November 9, 1990), known as Georgia Boy Williams, was a Florida state legislator. He served in the Florida House of Representatives from 1956 to 1959 for Columbia County, Florida. He lived in Lake City, Florida.

Williams was born in 1908 at Bonifay, Florida and was educated at public schools. He married Ocille A. Jenkins of Chipley, Florida and had four children, Phyllis Amanda, Sylvia Del, Billie Joe and Freddie June. His occupation was a Greyhound bus driver. Williams' religion was listed as Methodist and recreational interests as fishing and football.
