= Cerrogordo, Florida =

- Unincorporated community
- Location within Florida Location within the United States
- Coordinates: 30°49′55″N 85°53′15″W
- Country: United States
- State: Florida
- County: Holmes
- Elevation: 85 ft (26 m)
- Time zone: UTC-6 (Central (CST))
  - Summer (DST): UTC-5 (CDT)
- Area code: 850
- GNIS feature ID: 294709

Cerrogordo is an unincorporated community in Holmes County, Florida, United States.
