= Waits Mansion =

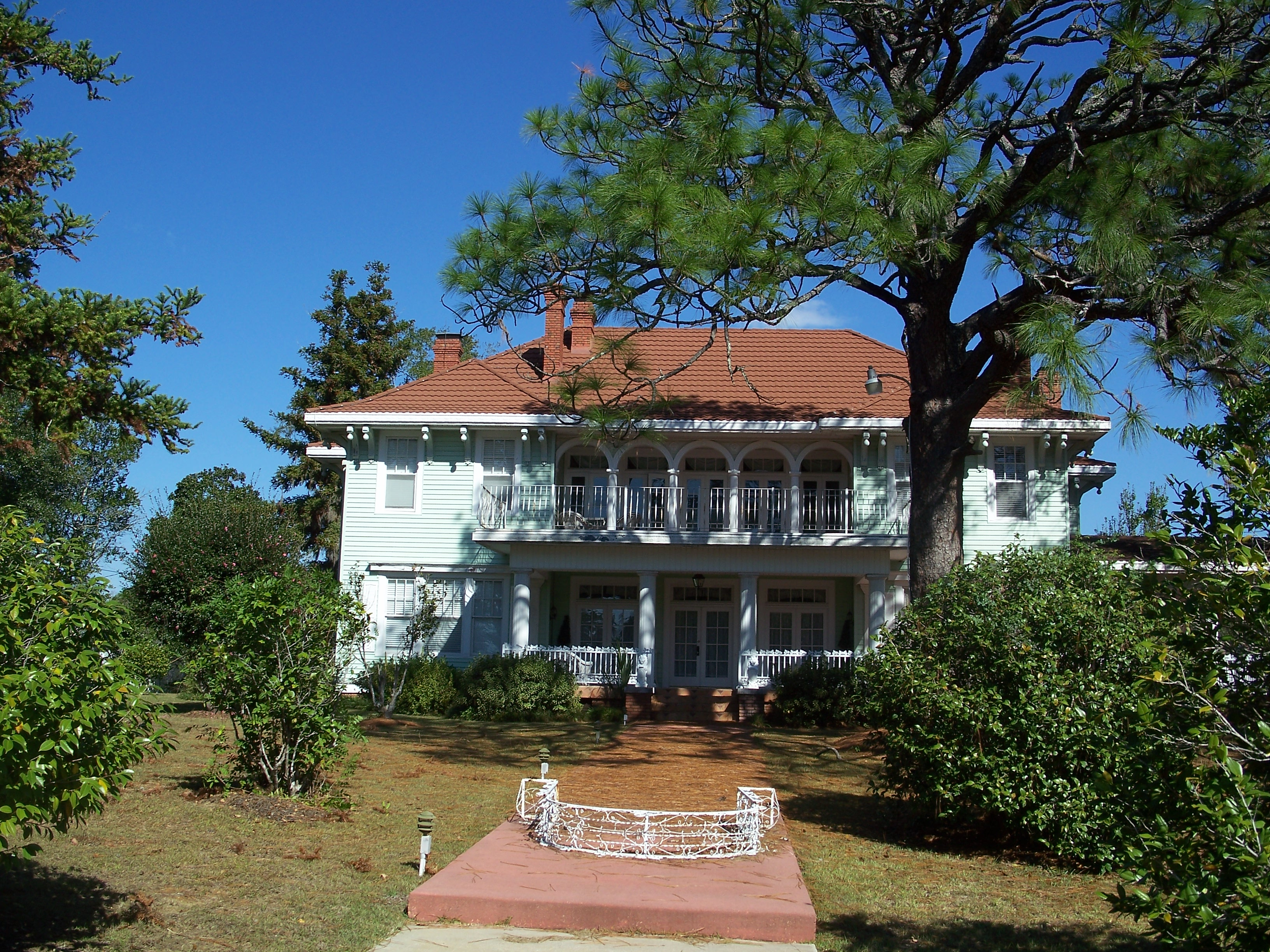
- Interactive map of the Waits Mansion area

General information
- Architectural style: Mediterranean Revival
- Location: 209 W. Kansas Ave, Bonifay, Florida, United States
- Coordinates: 30.796182°N 85.680821°W
- Completed: 1920s
- Client: George Orkney Waits

Technical details
- Structural system: wood frame and siding with tile roof

Design and construction
- Engineer: Builder: George Orkney Waits

The Waits Mansion is an historic two-story Mediterranean Revival style house in Bonifay, Florida. The mansion was built by lumber company owner George Orkney Waits in the 1920s for his own use.

== Location ==
The Waits Mansion features recessed porches on each of the front floors with fluted Doric columns on the first floor porch. White wrought iron fencing is used on both porches as well as along the two bordering streets.

== Description ==
The interior of the Mansion features a grand staircase from the large entrance foyer to a windowed landing with smaller stairways on the left and right leading to the second floor. In recent years, the mansion was used as a bed and breakfast.

== History ==
In 1919, George Orkney Waits purchased the land for the Waits Mansion from M.E. and Meridien Johnson. The architect was a Mr. Ausfeldt and the contractor was William Whaley. George Waits and his wife lived in the mansion for a short time, then moved out of state.

In 1936, James C. Waits, the oldest Waits son, and his wife bought the Waits Mansion from the Henderson Waits Lumber Company. They restored it and planted azaleas, camellias and other shrubs .

Prior to James Wait's death in 1948, the Waits Manions was converted into apartments. It was later sold to Mr. and Mrs. Robert Hall, two of the tenants. In 1976. Dorothy Garver bought the mansion and restored it to a one-family residence.

The next owner was Frank Barone, who operated the Waits Mansion as lodging and party venue. The most recent owner was Don Smith, who started more restoration work.
