= USS Charlotte (1862) =

Union Navy schooner

History

United States
- Acquired: 6 November 1862
- Commissioned: 1862
- Captured: by Union Navy forces; 10 April 1862
- Fate: Sold, 27 April 1867

General characteristics
- Displacement: 70 tons
- Propulsion: sail
- Complement: 14
- Armament: 2 guns

USS Charlotte was a schooner captured by the Union Navy during the American Civil War. She was used by the Union Navy to patrol navigable waterways of the Confederacy to prevent the South from trading with other countries.

== Service history ==
Charlotte, a schooner used as a blockade runner, was captured off Mobile, Alabama, 10 April 1862 by USS Kanawha; condemned by the prize court at Boston, Massachusetts; purchased by the Navy 6 November 1862; placed under command of Acting Master E. D. Bruner; and assigned to the West Gulf Blockading Squadron. Charlotte's first station was in Choctawhatchee Bay, Alabama, from which on 27 December 1862 she sailed up river to capture the steamer Bloomer. The ship had been laid up since the beginning of the War, and Charlotte's men repaired her engines so that she could sail to Pensacola, Florida.

The schooner continued to blockade off the East Pass of the Mississippi River, performing reconnaissance through which she was able to report movements of Confederate troops and act as a tender. She was later joined on station by Bloomer, which had been taken into the Navy. Although the Dictionary of American Fighting Ships does say that Charlotte guarded the East Pass of the Mississippi River, the Official Records of the Union and Confederate Navies of the War of the Rebellion lists her as being posted, along with the Bloomer at the East Pass of Choctawhatchee Bay, also known as the East Pass of Santa Rosa Island, which is near the present day city of Milton, Florida.Charlotte was sold at Pensacola 27 April 1867.
