= Gronocarus =

Scientific classification
- Kingdom: Animalia
- Phylum: Arthropoda
- Clade: Pancrustacea
- Class: Insecta
- Order: Coleoptera
- Suborder: Polyphaga
- Infraorder: Scarabaeiformia
- Family: Scarabaeidae
- Tribe: Melolonthini
- Genus: Gronocarus; Schaeffer, 1927

Genus of beetles

Gronocarus is a genus of May beetles and junebugs in the family Scarabaeidae. There are at least three described species in Gronocarus.

== Species ==
These three species belong to the genus Gronocarus:

- Gronocarus autumnalis Schaeffer, 1927 (lobed spiny burrowing beetle)
- Gronocarus inornatus Skelley, 2005 (lobeless spiny burrowing beetle)
