= Gritney, Florida =

- Unincorporated community
- Location within Florida Location within the United States
- Coordinates: 30°50′18″N 85°49′49″W
- Country: United States
- State: Florida
- County: Holmes
- Elevation: 72 ft (22 m)
- Time zone: UTC-6 (Central (CST))
  - Summer (DST): UTC-5 (CDT)
- Area code: 850
- GNIS feature ID: 295324

Gritney is an unincorporated community in Holmes County, Florida, United States.
