= Prosperity, Florida =

Unincorporated community in Florida, U.S.

- Unincorporated community
- Interactive map of Prosperity, Florida
- Coordinates: 30°51′07″N 85°56′49″W
- Country: United States
- State: Florida
- County: Holmes
- Post office established: 1898
- Post office closed: 1907
- Time zone: UTC−6 (CST)
  - Summer (DST): UTC−5 (CDT)

Prosperity is an unincorporated community in Holmes County, in the U.S. state of Florida.

== History ==
A post office called Prosperity was established in 1898, and remained in operation until 1907. The town's named was given by one its founders who believed the "coming of the post office seemed to hold a promise of prosperity".
