= 91st New York Infantry Regiment =

- Active: December, 1861 to July 3, 1865
- Country: United States
- Allegiance: Union
- Branch: Union Army
- Role: Infantry
- Nickname(s): Albany Regiment
- Engagements: American Civil War: Siege of Port Hudson

The 91st New York Infantry Regiment was a state infantry regiment formed during the American Civil War from counties around Albany, New York.

== Service ==
The unit was first sent to Key West, Florida, then to Fort Pickens, Florida, near Pensacola, Florida. Soldiers from the 91st New York took part in the raid on Bagdad, Florida August 7–10, 1862.

Later they were part of a raid into southern Alabama. They captured the steamboat Bloomer from the Town of Geneva, in what was then Coffee County, in the latter part of 1862, and early 1863. Lt. James H. Stewart led the raid, and was accompanied by a naval unit commanded by acting master Elias Bruner of the USS Charlotte. Although no shots were fired, due to the raid, Alabama raised defensive Confederate troops in the area which were stationed in southern Alabama until needed elsewhere.

The regiment participated in the occupation of Baton Rouge, Louisiana, from December 1862 to March 1863. Then they took part in operations in western Louisiana. From May 24, 1863, to July 9, 1863, the 91st New York took part in the Siege of Port Hudson, one of the last impediments (Vicksburg was the other) to Federal control of the Mississippi. The regiment's next duty was at Fort Jackson, part of the defenses of New Orleans, as the garrison from July, 1863, to August, 1864. The regiment was then given veteran furlough until October, 1864.

In October, 1864, the regiment was transferred to the defenses of Baltimore, Maryland, as part of the VIII Corps, previously the Middle Department to February, 1865.

In February, 1865, the regiment was transferred to the 1st Brigade, 3rd Division, V Corps, Army of the Potomac to June, 1865. They took part in the Siege of Petersburg and the Appomattox Campaign, including the Battle of Lewis's Farm, March 29, 1865; Battle of White Oak Road, March 30–31; Battle of Five Forks, 1 April 1865; Third Battle of Petersburg and pursuit of General Robert E. Lee's Army of Northern Virginia from April 3–9, 1865; to Appomattox Court House, Virginia, where Lee surrendered his army on April 9, 1865. As part of a post-war reorganization, they briefly became the 3rd Brigade, 3rd Division, V Corps for duty at Washington, D.C. until July 3, 1865, when they were mustered out.

The regiment lost 3 officers and 110 enlisted men killed and mortally wounded and 1 officer and 184 enlisted men by disease for a total of 298 men, during their service. More men were killed by disease than were killed in combat.

== Mail-in ballot fraud scheme ==
In the fall of 1864, Orville Wood, a merchant from Clinton County and supporter of Abraham Lincoln in the 1864 presidential election, was tasked to visit hometown troops and "look after the local ticket." After he arrived at Fort McHenry to visit the 91st, an Army captain suggested there had been some "checker playing" in gathering soldiers' mail-in ballots. Wood was later told by Moses Ferry, representative of Democratic governor Horatio Seymour in Baltimore, that the ballots had already been counted: 400 for Democratic candidate and former Army of the Potomac commander George McClellan and only 11 for Lincoln. Wood reported this and other such operations he discovered to authorities, and less than two weeks before the election on October 27, 1864, Ferry and another political operative named Edward Donahue, Jr. were tried before a military commission. Ferry confessed and offered up names of other conspirators, while Donahue continued to trial and was convicted, partly on Wood's testimony. Both were sentenced to life in prison, with Lincoln's approval.

== Commanders ==
- Colonel Jacob van Zandt - court-martialled and dismissed, February 1865
- Colonel Jonathan Tarbell

== See also ==
- List of New York Civil War regiments
