= Choctawhatchee River =

River in Alabama and Florida, United States

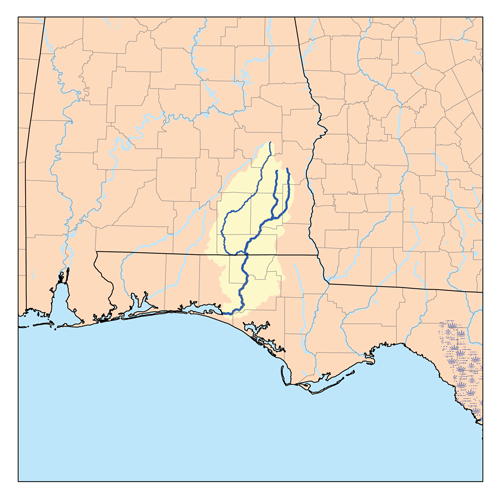
- Map of Choctawhatchee River

Physical characteristics
- Source: East Fork Choctawhatchee River
  - location: Barbour County, Alabama
  - coordinates: 31.8687°N 85.3634°W
- 2nd source: Pauls Creek–West Fork Choctawhatchee River
  - location: Barbour County, Alabama
  - coordinates: 31.8530°N 85.4840°W
- Source confluence
  - location: Dale County, Alabama
  - coordinates: 31.3611°N 85.5460°W
- Mouth
  - location: Choctawhatchee Bay
  - coordinates: 30.40380°N 86.12355°W
- Length: 141 mi (227 km)

The Choctawhatchee River is a 141-mile-long (227 km) river in the southern United States, flowing through southeast Alabama and the Panhandle of Florida before emptying into Choctawhatchee Bay in Okaloosa and Walton counties. The river, the bay and their adjacent watersheds collectively drain 5,350 square miles (13,900 km^{2}).

== Overview ==
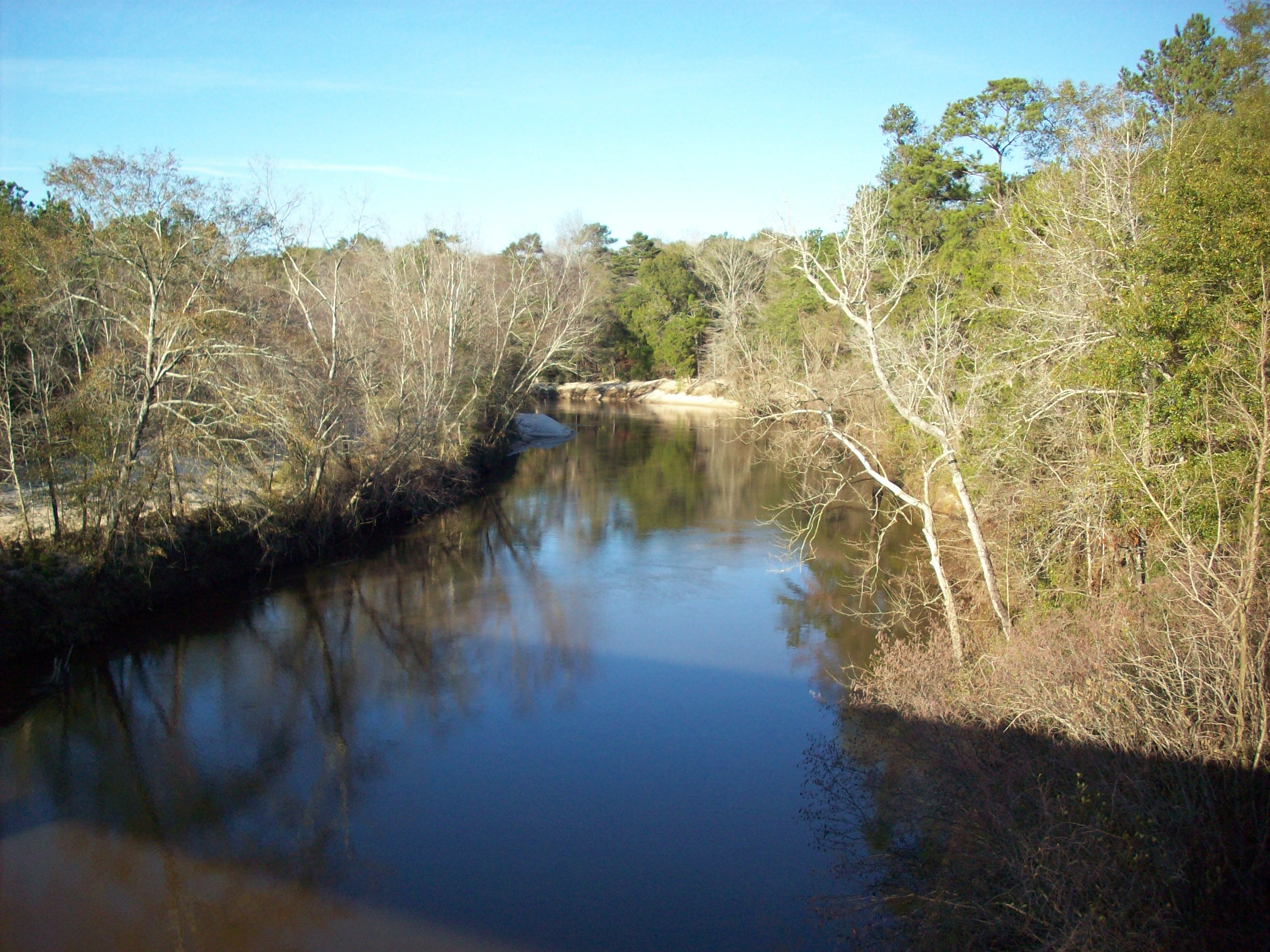
Near Daleville, Alabama

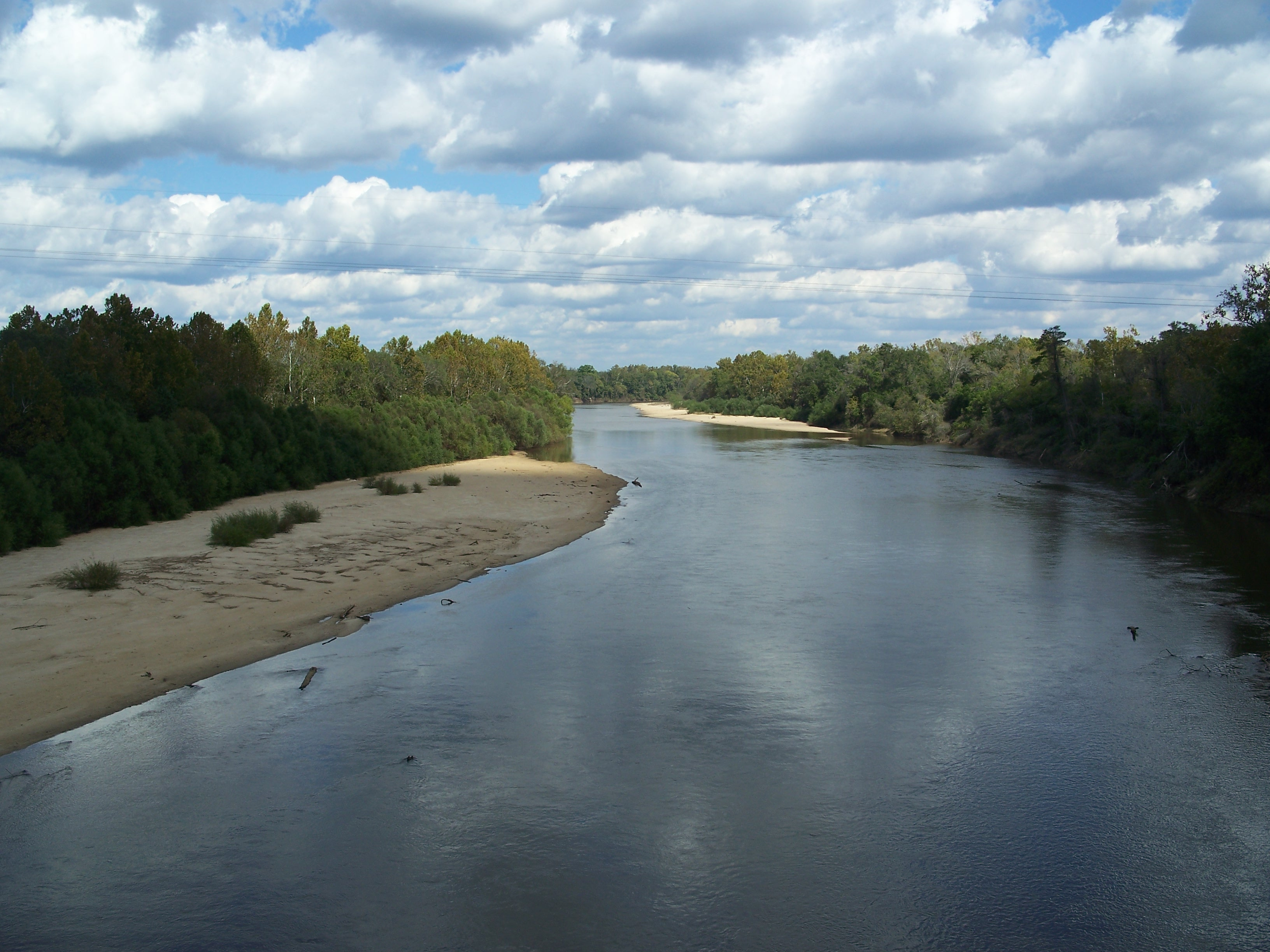
Near Pittman, Holmes County, Florida

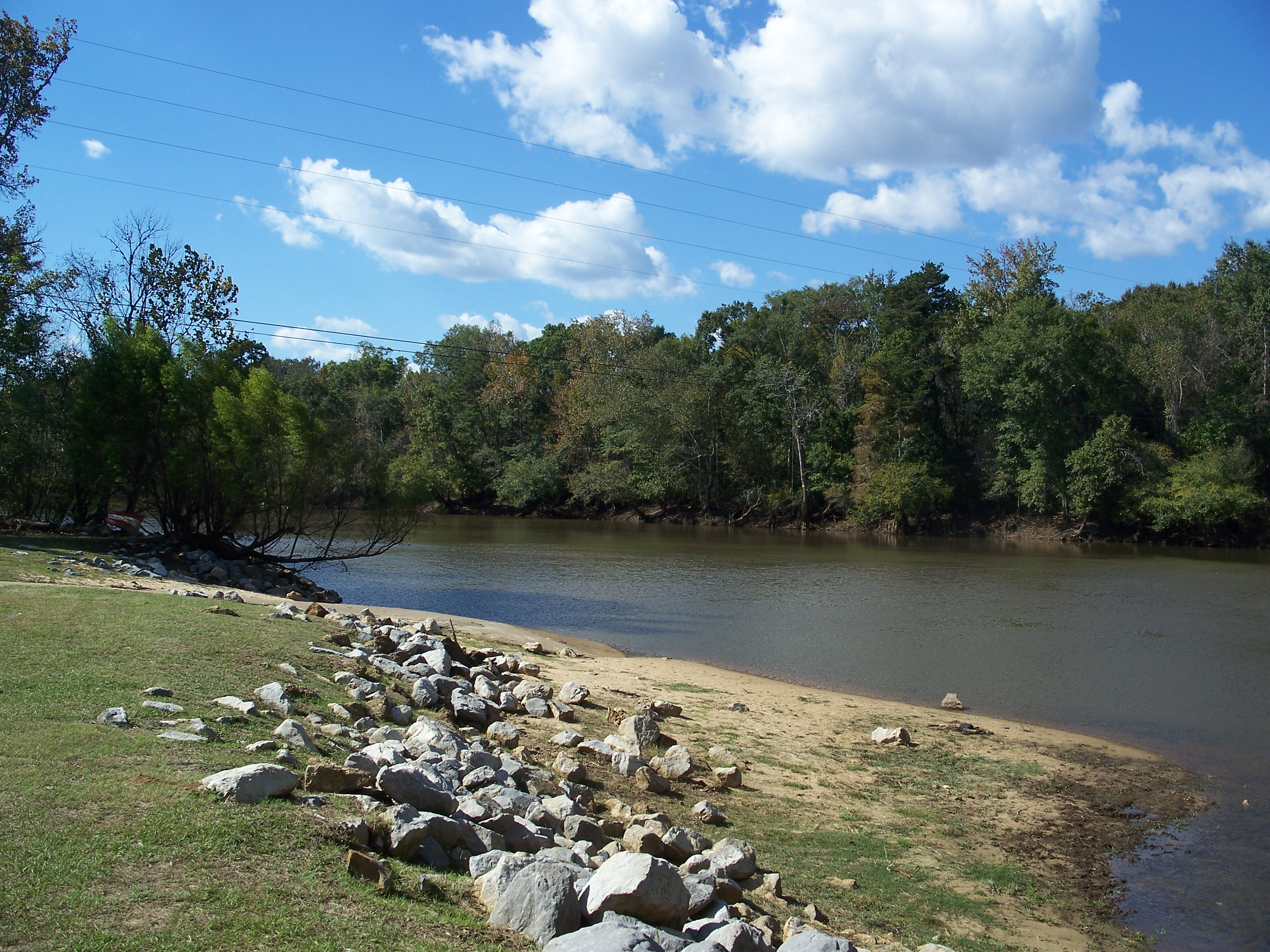
Between Westville, Florida and Caryville, Florida

The Choctawhatchee originates as two separate forks (East Fork and West Fork) in Barbour County, Alabama; the East Fork flows through Henry County and joins the West Fork in eastern Dale County about four miles (6 km) above Newton.

The unified river then flows southwest through Dale and Geneva counties into Florida, collecting tributaries along the way: the Little Choctawhatchee River in Dale County, and the Pea River near Geneva. It then flows south into Florida, terminating at Choctawhatchee Bay. Other Alabama tributaries are Claybank Creek and Tight Eye Creek.

Once in Florida, the river continues southwesterly through Holmes, Walton and Bay counties until reaching its namesake bay. Major tributaries in Florida include Holmes, Wright, Sandy, Pine Log, Seven Run and Bruce creeks. Choctawhatchee Bay empties into the Gulf of Mexico at East Pass near Destin, Florida.

== Flora and fauna ==
The Choctawhatchee contains several species of fish, including several species of sunfish, channel catfish and spotted bass; other species include Redhorse suckers and carpsuckers. Gulf Sturgeon, Alabama Shad, and Skipjack Shad use the river for spawning activities; the U.S. Fish and Wildlife Service even collected 522 different sturgeon during a study conducted in October and November 2008; sizes ranging from 1 to 160 pounds. Scientists report sighting sturgeon as far upriver as Newton; they appear to prefer the limestone bottoms for laying their eggs.

As recently as the 1920s, sturgeon fishing was a thriving industry in Geneva, with many large fish being caught, packed in barrels, and shipped north.

Twenty-one Aquatic Snails and Freshwater Mussel species exist in the Choctawhatchee, with one of the former and two of the latter found only in this particular river.

Researchers from Auburn University and the University of Windsor, Ontario, reported possible sightings in 2005 and 2006 of ivory-billed woodpeckers along the Choctawhatchee River.

About 70% of the Choctawhatchee's watershed is forested; the remainder is mostly croplands and pasture. Trees found along the Choctawhatchee include southern pine, beech, magnolia, laurel oak, basswood, Florida maple and American holly. The lower Choctawhatchee contains "pitcher-plant bog" and other swamp habitat, including cypress trees draped with Spanish moss. Alligators are found in the river's lower reaches.

== Water quality ==
The Choctawhatchee has little industry along its banks; consequently it has rather clean water, except for excess turbidity, usually due to runoff from unpaved county roads. The Choctawhatchee, Pea and Yellow Rivers Watershed Management District was instrumental in getting a grant to place gravel on many county roads, which reduced the average turbidity.

Illegal dumping of household garbage and animal carcasses is a problem, but not enough of one to seriously affect water quality in the Alabama portion of the river, where water quality is described as "good to very good". This changes somewhat in the Florida section of the river, due to the presence of several wastewater treatment plants, animal-waste sites, and erosion. Three of the river's Florida tributaries are described as "polluted" with "waste water effluent".

== Flooding ==
The Choctawhatchee has not always been on good behavior, having flooded Geneva in the so-called "Lincoln Freshet" of 1865, and the Hoover Flood of 1929. The Lincoln Freshet induced many of the townspeople to move to higher ground approximately a half-mile north, while the Hoover Flood swept away most of the remnants of Old Town Geneva. Damage from subsequent floods has been limited by a WPA-project levee. Areas outside the levee did not fare so well, and were purchased by FEMA after three floods during the 1990s. The March 1990 flood caused over $88 million in damages.

Similar flooding occurred in Caryville, Florida in July 1994, in which the river rose to 29 feet, submerging most of the town. A federal FEMA 'buyout' program was implemented, allowing many residents to leave. As a result, the population dropped from 1500 to under 200.

== Historical anecdotes ==
A natural inland waterway connects Choctawhatchee Bay to Pensacola Bay, making it possible for keelboats and later steamboats to navigate between Pensacola, Florida and Geneva, Alabama, and as far upstream as Newton. Before that, the river was a supply route and avenue of commerce for thousands of years to the indigenous peoples of the area.

Sam Story, also known as Timpoochee Kinnard, was chief of a band of Euchee (Yuchi) Indians in the early 19th century in present-day Walton County. They occupied lands on and to the west of the Choctawhatchee River. His parents were a Yuchi woman, whose name is not known, and Timothy Kinnard, a white man of Scottish descent, who had come to the area as a trader. According to the matrilineal system of the Yuchi, Sam was considered born to his mother's people and he was raised as Yuchi. The chief became a well-known figure in the Florida Panhandle and was highly respected by whites. Following the United States' acquisition of this territory in 1821 from Spain, European Americans entered the panhandle in greater numbers, encroaching on Euchee and Creek territory.

In 1814 Andrew Jackson built a stockade called the "Block House" at the confluence of the East and West forks of the Chocktawhatchee, near Newton.

European-American settlers also used the river in their time, from the years of the earliest land patents around Geneva (1841) until the late 1930s. The Bloomer, a 130-ton side-wheeler with high-pressure engines, navigated the route between Geneva and Pensacola in 1857, as did the Brooklyn, a steamboat built in Geneva.

During the American Civil War, the Confederate steamboat Bloomer was the object of an 1862 raid by 25 Union soldiers of the 91st New York State Volunteers, who were stationed at Fort Pickens near Pensacola. This attack was led by Lt. James H. Stewart, assisted by Acting Master Elias D. Bruner, of the USS Charlotte (1862), along with Acting Ensign Edward Crissey. They seized the steamboat in Geneva without firing a shot, and sailed it down the Choctawhatchee to the Bay.

== Recreation ==
The Choctawhatchee is a popular river with canoeists, although access to the upper portions is difficult. The Canoe-Camping website named the Choctawhatchee "an undiscovered gem" and "a beauty", heartily recommending it to canoeists. Several public access points and camping sites make the river accessible for recreation.

== Crossings ==
Crossing	Carries	Image	Location	ID number	Coordinates
=== Alabama ===
-	US 84		Daleville, Dale County, Alabama		31.275268, -85.678006
-	SR 92		Daleville, Dale County, Alabama		31.236252, -85.688616
-	SR 167		Hartford, Geneva County, Alabama		31.169595, -85.741848
-	SR 52		Geneva, Geneva County, Alabama		31.041124, -85.852066
=== Florida ===
James Riley 'Jim' Paul Bridge	SR 2		Pittman, Holmes County, Florida		30.950096, -85.843135
RR bridge	Florida Gulf & Atlantic Railroad formerly CSX P&A Subdivision		Caryville, Florida		30.776182, -85.826699
George L. Dickenson Bridge	US 90		Caryville, Florida	520149	30.775675, -85.827163
-	Interstate 10				30.755683, -85.830120
Olan Rex Ferguson Bridge	SR 20		Ebro, Florida		30.451110, -85.898244

== See also ==
- South Atlantic-Gulf Water Resource Region
