= Noma, Florida =

Town in the state of Florida, United States

- Town
- Town of Noma
- Seal

- Location in Holmes County and the state of Florida
- Coordinates: 30°58′49″N 85°37′31″W
- Country: United States
- State: Florida
- County: Holmes
- Settled: 1882
- Incorporated: July 1904
- Reincorporated: 1977

Government
  - Type: Mayor-Council
  - Mayor: Literman Joseph
  - Vice Mayor: Coy Mixon
  - Councilmembers: Josephine Curry, Betty Forthman, and Daniel Arrant
  - Town Clerk: Ben Tew

Area
  - Total: 1.09 sq mi (2.83 km^{2})
  - Land: 1.07 sq mi (2.76 km^{2})
  - Water: 0.027 sq mi (0.07 km^{2})
- Elevation: 167 ft (51 m)

Population (2020)
  - Total: 208
  - Density: 194.9/sq mi (75.25/km^{2})
- Time zone: UTC-6 (Central (CST))
  - Summer (DST): UTC-5 (CDT)
- ZIP code: 32452
- Area code(s): 850, 448
- FIPS code: 12-48900
- GNIS feature ID: 2406996
- Website: nomafl.com

Noma is a town in Holmes County, Florida, United States. The Town of Noma is part of the Florida Panhandle in North Florida. The population was 208 at the 2020 census.

== Geography ==
The Town of Noma borders southern Alabama and located on the northeastern part of Holmes County.

According to the United States Census Bureau, the town has a total area of 1.1 square miles (2.8 km^{2}), all land.

=== Climate ===
The climate in this area is characterized by hot, humid summers and generally mild winters. According to the Köppen climate classification, the Town of Noma has a humid subtropical climate zone (Cfa).

== Demographics ==
Historical population
Census	Pop.	Note	%±
1980	113		—
1990	207		83.2%
2000	213		2.9%
2010	211		−0.9%
2020	208		−1.4%
U.S. Decennial Census

=== 2010 and 2020 census ===
Noma racial composition (Hispanics excluded from racial categories) (NH = Non-Hispanic)
Race	Pop 2010	Pop 2020	% 2010	% 2020
White (NH)	164	147	77.73%	70.67%
Black or African American (NH)	45	43	21.33%	20.67%
Native American or Alaska Native (NH)	0	0	0.00%	0.00%
Asian (NH)	0	0	0.00%	0.00%
Pacific Islander or Native Hawaiian (NH)	0	1	0.00%	0.48%
Some other race (NH)	0	1	0.00%	0.48%
Two or more races/Multiracial (NH)	2	8	0.95%	3.85%
Hispanic or Latino (any race)	0	8	0.00%	3.85%
Total	211	208		

As of the 2020 United States census, there were 208 people, 104 households, and 68 families residing in the town.

As of the 2010 United States census, there were 211 people, 111 households, and 82 families residing in the town.

=== 2000 census ===
As of the census of 2000, there were 213 people, 91 households, and 54 families residing in the town. The population density was 194.7 inhabitants per square mile (75.2/km^{2}). There were 104 housing units at an average density of 95.1 per square mile (36.7/km^{2}). The racial makeup of the town was 77.93% White, 19.25% African American, 0.94% Pacific Islander, 0.47% from other races, and 1.41% from two or more races. Hispanic or Latino of any race were 1.41% of the population.

In 2000, there were 91 households, out of which 28.6% had children under the age of 18 living with them, 38.5% were married couples living together, 14.3% had a female householder with no husband present, and 39.6% were non-families. 36.3% of all households were made up of individuals, and 20.9% had someone living alone who was 65 years of age or older. The average household size was 2.34 and the average family size was 3.07.

In 2000, in the town, the population was spread out, with 23.5% under the age of 18, 8.0% from 18 to 24, 31.0% from 25 to 44, 22.1% from 45 to 64, and 15.5% who were 65 years of age or older. The median age was 39 years. For every 100 females, there were 95.4 males. For every 100 females age 18 and over, there were 83.1 males.

In 2000, the median income for a household in the town was $26,250, and the median income for a family was $40,625. Males had a median income of $20,000 versus $21,250 for females. The per capita income for the town was $10,958. About 14.3% of families and 18.3% of the population were below the poverty line, including 17.5% of those under the age of eighteen and 33.3% of those 65 or over.
