= Holmes County, Florida =

County in Florida, United States

- County
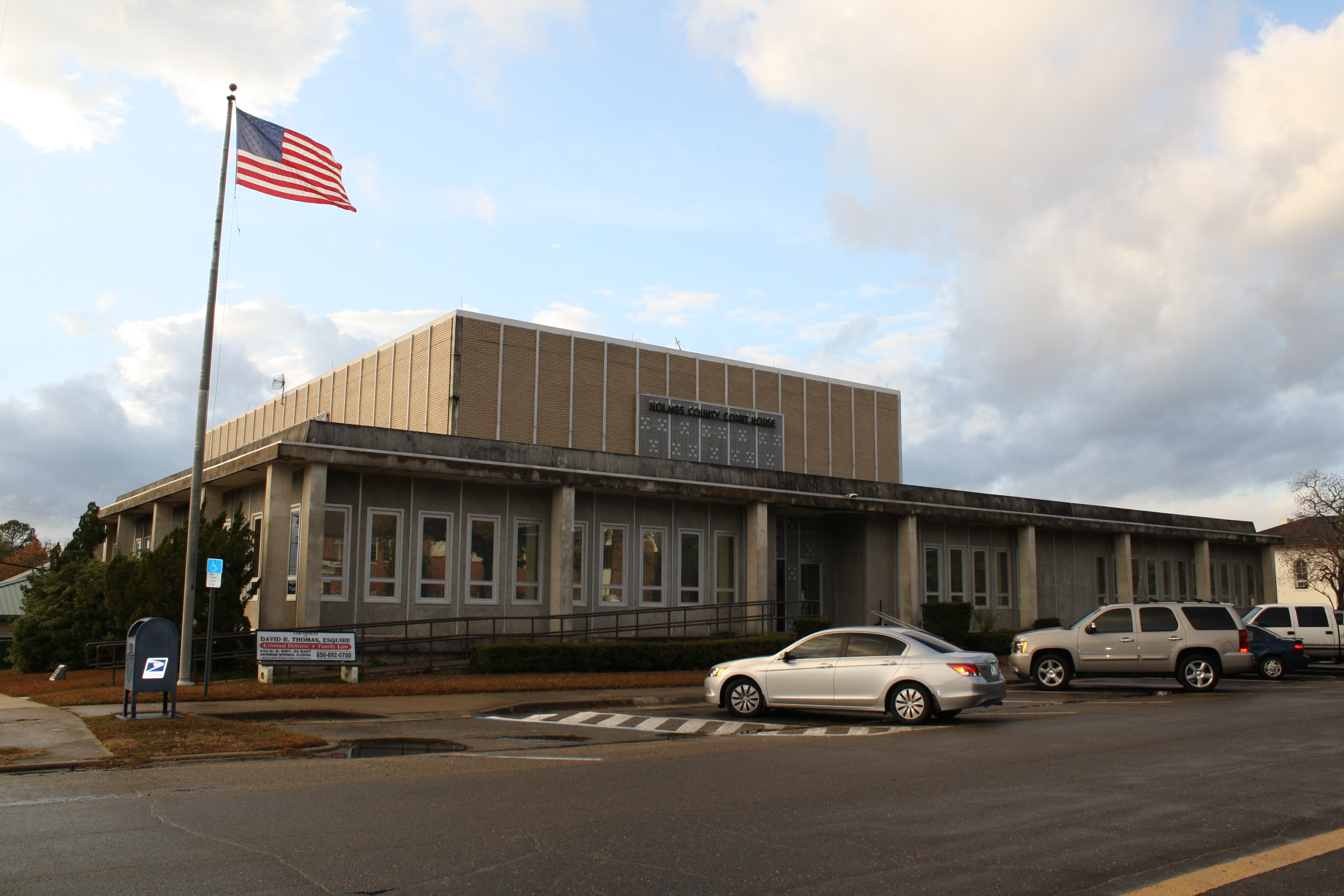
- Holmes County Courthouse

- Seal

- Location within the U.S. state of Florida
- Coordinates: 30°52′N 85°49′W
- Country: United States
- State: Florida
- Founded: January 8, 1848
- Seat: Bonifay
- Largest city: Bonifay

Area
  - Total: 489 sq mi (1,270 km^{2})
  - Land: 479 sq mi (1,240 km^{2})
  - Water: 10 sq mi (26 km^{2}) 2.1%

Population (2020)
  - Total: 19,653
  - Estimate (2025): 20,119 ▲
  - Density: 41.0/sq mi (15.8/km^{2})
- Time zone: UTC−6 (Central)
  - Summer (DST): UTC−5 (CDT)
- Congressional district: 2nd
- Website: holmescountyfla.com

Holmes County is a county located in the northwestern part of the U.S. state of Florida, in the Panhandle. As of the 2020 census, the population was 19,653. Its county seat is Bonifay.

== History ==
Holmes County was created in 1848.

The county's namesake is a point of debate. Holmes Creek – the county's eastern boundary – bore that name before the county was created, but it was originally named Weekaywehatchee (a Muscogee name meaning "spring creek"). One claim is that the county was named for Thomas J. Holmes, who came from North Carolina to settle in the area about 1830. Another is that it is named after Holmes, an American Indian chief who settled in the area with his band of Red Stick Creek after 1814. He was subsequently killed in 1818 by a raiding party sent by Andrew Jackson during the First Seminole War.

Holmes County has had four county seats in its history. The first was Hewett's Bluff (later renamed Bear Pen, then Cerro Gordo), then Pittman's Ferry, then Westville, and finally Bonifay. Bonifay has been the county seat since 1905.

=== Historic places ===
Historic places in the county include:

- Keith Cabin in Pittman
- Waits Mansion, Bonifay
- Vortex Spring, Northern Ponce de Leon

Ponce de Leon Springs State Park, Ponce de Leon

== Geography ==
According to the U.S. Census Bureau, the county has a total area of 489 square miles (1,270 km^{2}), of which 479 square miles (1,240 km^{2}) is land and 10 square miles (26 km^{2}) (2.1%) is water. It is the fifth-smallest county in Florida by total area.

=== Adjacent counties ===
- Geneva County, Alabama – north
- Jackson County, Florida – east
- Washington County, Florida – south
- Walton County, Florida – west

== Demographics ==
=== Racial and ethnic composition ===
Holmes County, Florida – Racial and ethnic composition Note: the US Census treats Hispanic/Latino as an ethnic category. This table excludes Latinos from the racial categories and assigns them to a separate category. Hispanics/Latinos may be of any race.
Race / Ethnicity (NH = Non-Hispanic)	Pop 1980	Pop 1990	Pop 2000	Pop 2010	Pop 2020	% 1980	% 1990	% 2000	% 2010	% 2020
White alone (NH)	14,184	14,619	16,501	17,722	16,766	96.34%	92.65%	88.89%	88.93%	85.31%
Black or African American alone (NH)	291	768	1,190	1,140	1,211	1.98%	4.87%	6.41%	5.72%	6.16%
Native American or Alaska Native alone (NH)	83	163	177	143	120	0.56%	1.03%	0.95%	0.72%	0.61%
Asian alone (NH)	34	50	72	83	81	0.23%	0.32%	0.39%	0.42%	0.41%
Native Hawaiian or Pacific Islander alone (NH)	x	x	6	27	13	x	x	0.03%	0.14%	0.07%
Other race alone (NH)	12	2	30	6	27	0.08%	0.01%	0.16%	0.03%	0.14%
Mixed race or Multiracial (NH)	x	x	230	362	747	x	x	1.24%	1.82%	3.80%
Hispanic or Latino (any race)	119	176	358	444	688	0.81%	1.12%	1.93%	2.23%	3.50%
Total	14,723	15,778	18,564	19,927	19,653	100.00%	100.00%	100.00%	100.00%	100.00%

Historical population
Census	Pop.	Note	%±
1850	1,205		—
1860	1,386		15.0%
1870	1,572		13.4%
1880	2,170		38.0%
1890	4,336		99.8%
1900	7,762		79.0%
1910	11,557		48.9%
1920	12,850		11.2%
1930	12,924		0.6%
1940	15,447		19.5%
1950	13,988		−9.4%
1960	10,844		−22.5%
1970	10,720		−1.1%
1980	14,723		37.3%
1990	15,778		7.2%
2000	18,564		17.7%
2010	19,927		7.3%
2020	19,653		−1.4%
2025 (est.)	20,119	▲	2.4%
U.S. Decennial Census; 1790-1960 1900-1990; 1990-2000 2010-2019

A map of the racial demographics in Holmes County by Census tract Legend: Non-Hispanic White 70–80% 80–90% >90% Black or African American 40–50%

=== 2020 census ===
As of the 2020 census, the county had a population of 19,653, 7,282 households, and 4,778 families. The population density was 41.0 per square mile (15.8/km²), and there were 8,622 housing units at an average density of 18.0 per square mile (7.0/km²). Among occupied housing units, 76.0% were owner-occupied and 24.0% were renter-occupied; the homeowner vacancy rate was 1.5% and the rental vacancy rate was 7.6%.

The racial makeup of the county was 86.8% White, 6.3% Black or African American, 0.7% American Indian and Alaska Native, 0.5% Asian, 0.1% Native Hawaiian and Pacific Islander, 1.2% from some other race, and 4.5% from two or more races. Hispanic or Latino residents of any race comprised 3.5% of the population.

Less than 0.1% of residents lived in urban areas, while 100.0% lived in rural areas.

There were 7,282 households in the county, of which 28.8% had children under the age of 18 living in them; 46.3% were married couples living together; 21.4% were households with a male householder and no spouse or partner present; and 27.0% were households with a female householder and no spouse or partner present. About 29.6% of all households were made up of individuals and 15.2% had someone living alone who was 65 years of age or older. The average household size was 2.5 and the average family size was 3.0. The percent of those with a bachelor’s degree or higher was estimated to be 7.3% of the population.

20.6% of the population was under the age of 18, 7.4% from 18 to 24, 24.1% from 25 to 44, 27.3% from 45 to 64, and 20.7% who were 65 years of age or older. The median age was 43.1 years. For every 100 females there were 114.7 males, and for every 100 females age 18 and over there were 116.8 males age 18 and over.

The 2016–2020 5-year American Community Survey estimates show that the median household income was $39,215 (with a margin of error of +/- $3,549). The median family income was $48,511 (+/- $3,115). Males had a median income of $26,725 (+/- $1,071) versus $25,931 (+/- $2,337) for females. The median income for those above 16 years old was $26,486 (+/- $958). Approximately, 17.7% of families and 21.4% of the population were below the poverty line, including 27.8% of those under the age of 18 and 10.3% of those ages 65 or over.

=== 2000 census ===
As of the census of 2000, there were 18,564 people, 6,921 households, and 4,893 families residing in the county. The population density was 38 people per square mile (15 people/km^{2}). There were 7,998 housing units at an average density of 17 per square mile (6.6/km^{2}). The racial makeup of the county was 89.79% White, 6.51% Black or African American, 1.01% Native American, 0.39% Asian, 0.03% Pacific Islander, 0.79% from other races, and 1.48% from two or more races. 1.93% of the population were Hispanic or Latino of any race.

There were 6,921 households, out of which 30.90% had children under the age of 18 living with them, 55.60% were married couples living together, 10.80% had a female householder with no husband present, and 29.30% were non-families. 26.10% of all households were made up of individuals, and 12.40% had someone living alone who was 65 years of age or older. The average household size was 2.43 and the average family size was 2.92.

In the county, the population was spread out, with 23.10% under the age of 18, 8.80% from 18 to 24, 29.30% from 25 to 44, 24.00% from 45 to 64, and 14.80% who were 65 years of age or older. The median age was 38 years. For every 100 females there were 112.90 males. For every 100 females age 18 and over, there were 113.60 males.

The median income for a household in the county was $27,923, and the median income for a family was $34,286. Males had a median income of $25,982 versus $19,991 for females. The per capita income for the county was $14,135. About 15.40% of families and 19.10% of the population were below the poverty line, including 25.70% of those under age 18 and 17.90% of those age 65 or over.

=== Dominickers of Holmes County ===
The "Dominickers" were a number of related mixed-race families of white and Black descent, who lived for decades after the Civil War and well into the twentieth century in a rural area near Ponce de Leon. The 1950 federal census identified 60 members of this group living in Holmes County at that time, all classified as white.

== Politics ==
Holmes County is an archetypically "Solid South" county in Florida. It gave the fifth-highest percentage of the vote for segregationist George Wallace of any county in the country during the 1968 election, and apart from Deep South native Jimmy Carter, no Democrat since 1964 has obtained as much as thirty-four percent of the county's vote in any Presidential election.

Holmes County once had more registered Democrats than Republicans, but many were descendants of Dixiecrats, Southerners who registered as Democrats due to tradition but voted Republican in most elections. Barack Obama earned only 15.2% of the vote in 2012. Hillary Clinton earned less than 10% of the vote in 2016. In 2024, Holmes was the most Republican county in the state of Florida, when it gave just under 90% of its vote to Donald Trump.

United States presidential election results for Holmes County, Florida
Year	Republican		Democratic		Third party(ies)	
Year	No.	%	No.	%	No.	%
1904	140	29.60%	284	60.04%	49	10.36%
1908	337	39.00%	438	50.69%	89	10.30%
1912	52	7.74%	411	61.16%	209	31.10%
1916	427	28.83%	763	51.52%	291	19.65%
1920	537	33.56%	869	54.31%	194	12.13%
1924	377	32.03%	658	55.90%	142	12.06%
1928	2,260	74.44%	735	24.21%	41	1.35%
1932	429	13.71%	2,701	86.29%	0	0.00%
1936	772	19.37%	3,213	80.63%	0	0.00%
1940	887	24.84%	2,684	75.16%	0	0.00%
1944	908	25.51%	2,652	74.49%	0	0.00%
1948	492	15.39%	1,799	56.29%	905	28.32%
1952	1,230	27.67%	3,216	72.33%	0	0.00%
1956	1,036	29.17%	2,516	70.83%	0	0.00%
1960	1,235	34.26%	2,370	65.74%	0	0.00%
1964	3,225	73.00%	1,193	27.00%	0	0.00%
1968	377	7.00%	312	5.79%	4,700	87.21%
1972	3,819	92.51%	309	7.49%	0	0.00%
1976	1,850	35.71%	3,256	62.86%	74	1.43%
1980	3,221	52.41%	2,767	45.02%	158	2.57%
1984	4,548	78.70%	1,231	21.30%	0	0.00%
1988	4,225	71.61%	1,639	27.78%	36	0.61%
1992	3,196	48.96%	1,877	28.75%	1,455	22.29%
1996	3,249	47.75%	2,312	33.98%	1,243	18.27%
2000	5,012	67.77%	2,177	29.43%	207	2.80%
2004	6,412	77.25%	1,810	21.81%	78	0.94%
2008	7,033	81.63%	1,446	16.78%	137	1.59%
2012	6,919	83.46%	1,264	15.25%	107	1.29%
2016	7,483	87.46%	853	9.97%	220	2.57%
2020	8,080	89.01%	924	10.18%	74	0.82%
2024	8,193	89.72%	882	9.66%	57	0.62%

== Media ==
The Holmes County Times-Advertiser is now owned by Halifax Media. The weekly newspaper publishes each Wednesday.

- Townsend Broadcasting began Holmes County first FM radio station in 1984 broadcasting a mere 3000 watts. WTBB (townsend broadcasting Bonifay) WTBB broadcast a sound 10 format soft rock and classic oldies. WTBB general manager was Larry Donaldson assisting Mr. Donaldson who later became a radio Hit D.J. was C.J. Newcomb who went on to stations like WJST and Sunny 98.5. in the Panama City Market. WTBB was sold to Pirate Radio and studios were moved to Panama City, Fl. call sign for frequency 97.7 are still in Holmes County however studios have long gone.

== Education ==
Holmes District School Board is the sole school district in the county. Holmes County High School and Ponce de Leon High School are its public high schools. Poplar Springs High School is a K-12 Combination School in Northeastern Holmes County and Bethlehem High School is a K-12 Combination School in the Bethlehem Community.

The Holmes County Public Library is the county's library system. It is located at 303 North J. Harvey Etheridge Street, Bonifay, Florida 32425. The library is open Tuesday-Friday 8:00am–5:00pm, and Saturday 8:00am–12:00pm and offers public computers with internet access, free wi-fi, programming for all ages, and access to e-books, e-audiobooks, and numerous online databases and resources.

Holmes County is also a part of the Panhandle Public Library Cooperative System. PPLCS also includes Calhoun and Jackson counties.

== Communities ==
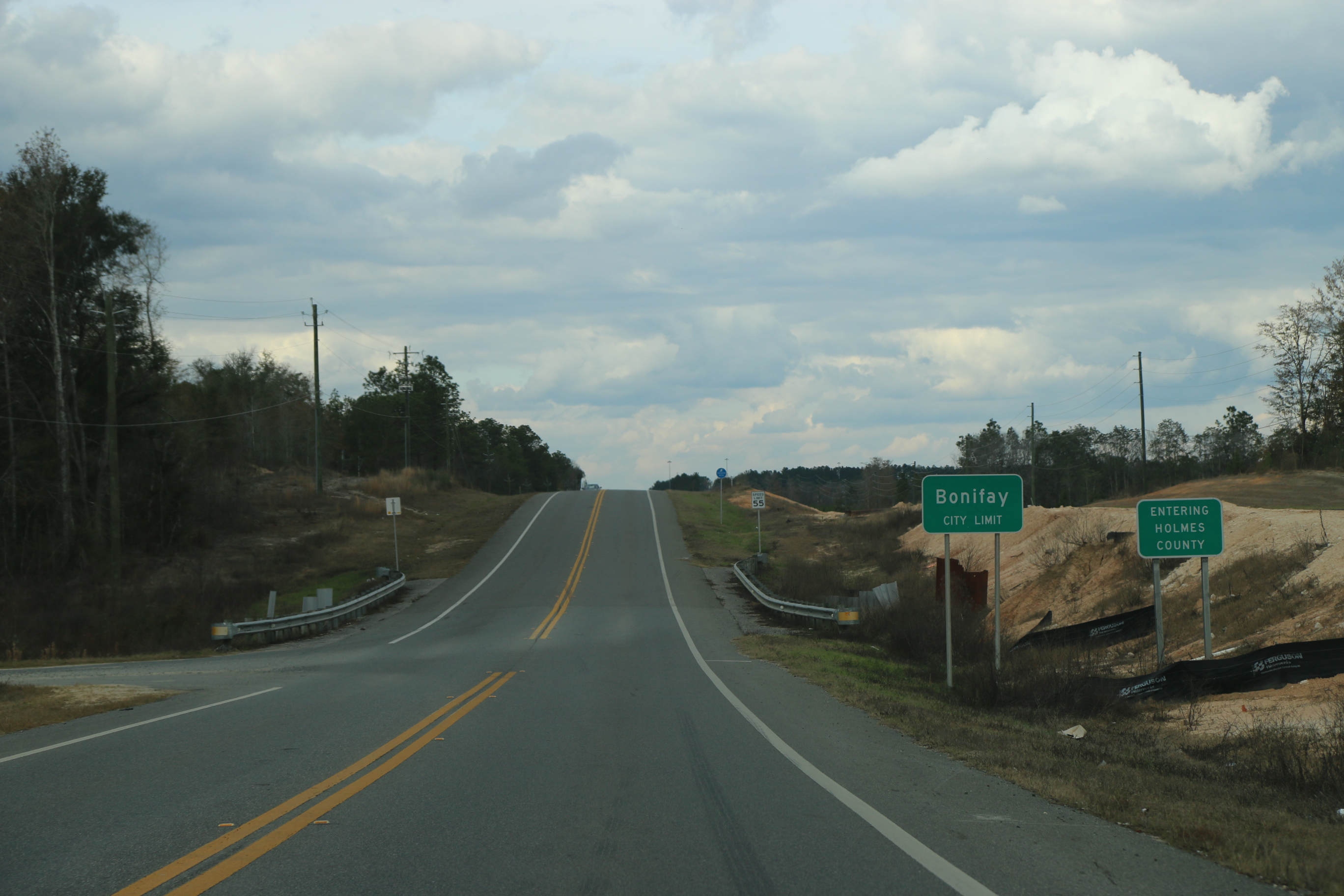
The Holmes County sign at Bonifay on Florida State Road 79.

=== City ===
- Bonifay (County seat)

=== Towns ===
- Esto
- Noma
- Ponce De Leon
- Westville

=== Unincorporated communities ===
- Bethlehem
- Cerrogordo
- Gritney
- Miller’s Crossroads
- Pittman
- Prosperity
- Poplar Springs
- Hamp Berry's Crossroads
- Leonia
- Sweet Gum Head

== Transportation ==
=== Airports ===
- Tri-County Airport

=== Major highways ===
- I-10 (Interstate 10) is the main west-to-east interstate highway in the county, and runs along southern Holmes County. It contains two interchanges within the county; SR 81 (Exit 94) in Ponce de Leon, then momentarily passes in and out of Washington County only to encounter the second interchange at SR 79 (Exit 112), in Bonifay.
- US 90 (U.S. Highway 90) was the main west-to-east highway in the county, until it was surpassed by I-10.
- SR 2 is the west-to-east route that's closest to the Alabama border beginning at SR 81 (see below). A tri-county extension runs west of SR 81 in Royal Crossroads through Walton and Okaloosa Counties.
- SR 79 is a south-to-north highway running though eastern Holmes County. The road enters the county from Washington County to the south as passes through Bonifay, Holland Crossroads and Esto, before finally crossing the Florida-Alabama State Line where it turns into AL 167.
- SR 81 is a south-to-north highway running through western Holmes County. The road enters the county from Walton County to the south as passes through Ponce De Leon, Prosperity, Hobbs Crossroads and Royal Crossroads, before finally crossing the Florida-Alabama State Line where it turns into AL 87.

=== Railroads ===
Holmes County has one railroad line. The primary one is the CSX P&A Subdivision, a line formerly owned by the Louisville and Nashville Railroad that served Amtrak's Sunset Limited. This service formerly went to New Orleans, but in 2005 service was truncated by the extensive damage in the Gulf area due to Hurricane Katrina. Another former L&N line existed within the northeastern corner of the county. The Georgiana Branch entered the state and county from Highnote, Alabama then ran through Esto and later Eleanor before crossing SR 2 and leaving the county towards Graceville and Campbellton, where it had a junction with the Bay Line Railroad.

== See also ==
- National Register of Historic Places listings in Holmes County, Florida
- USS Holmes County (LST-836)
