= Bonifay, Florida =

- City
- City of Bonifay
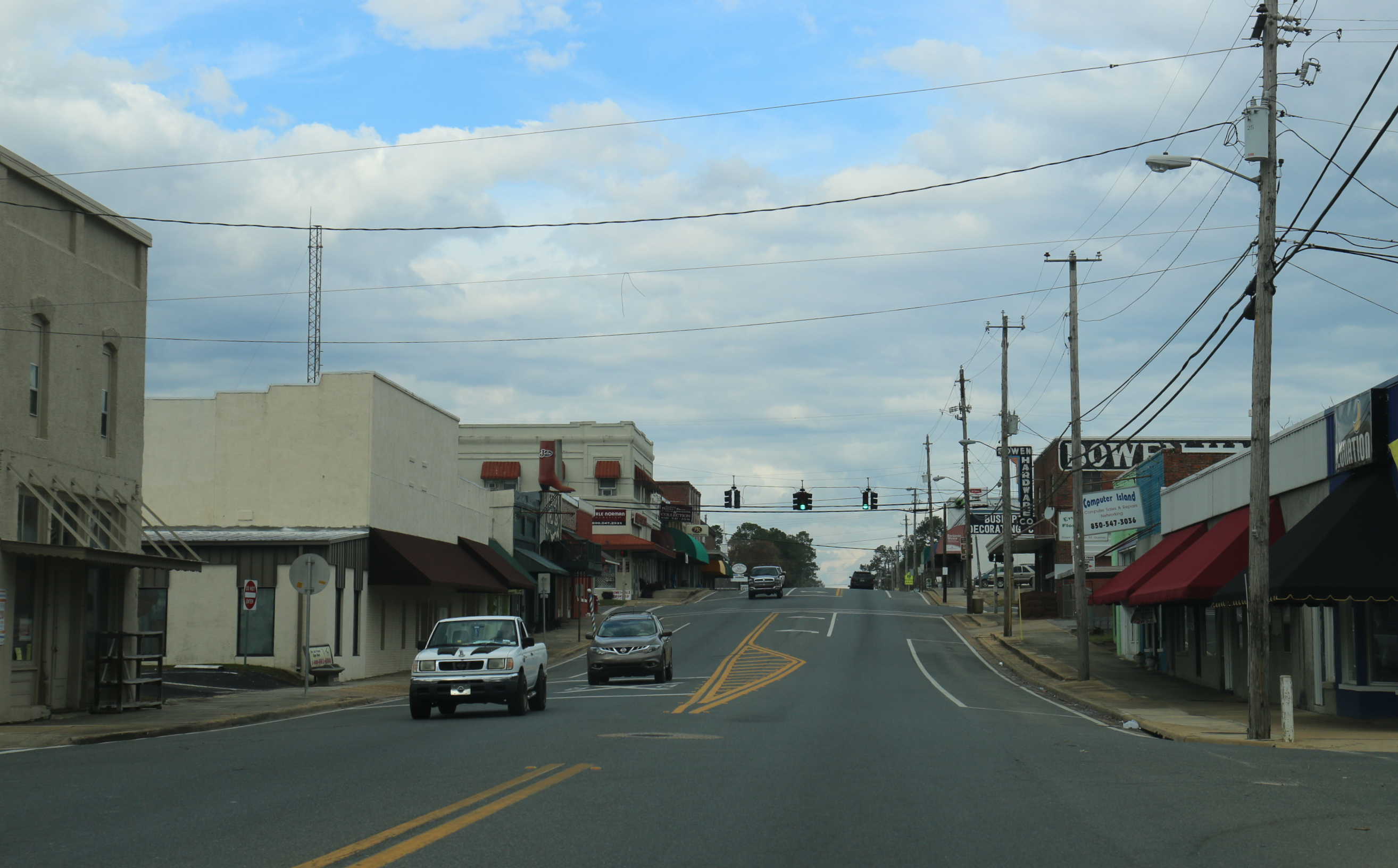
- Downtown Bonifay in 2017

- Seal
- Motto: "In God We Trust"
- Location in Holmes County and the state of Florida
- Coordinates: 30°45′46″N 85°41′16″W
- Country: United States
- State: Florida
- County: Holmes
- Settled (Four Hills): c. Late 1800s
- Settled (Bonifay): 1882
- Incorporated (Town of Bonifay): 1886
- Reincorporated (City of Bonifay): 1921

Government
  - Type: Mayor-Council
  - Mayor: Larry Cook
  - Vice Mayor: James W. Sellers
  - Councilmembers: Shelley Carroll, Eddie Dixon, and Rick Crews
  - City Clerk: Jessie Cheney
  - City Attorney: Michelle Blankenship Jordan

Area
  - Total: 4.78 sq mi (12.37 km^{2})
  - Land: 4.70 sq mi (12.18 km^{2})
  - Water: 0.073 sq mi (0.19 km^{2})
- Elevation: 141 ft (43 m)

Population (2020)
  - Total: 2,759
  - Density: 586.6/sq mi (226.49/km^{2})
- Time zone: UTC-6 (Central (CST))
  - Summer (DST): UTC-5 (CDT)
- ZIP code: 32425
- Area code(s): 850, 448
- FIPS code: 12-07450
- GNIS feature ID: 2403892
- Website: www.cityofbonifay.com

Bonifay is a city and the county seat of Holmes County, Florida, United States. As of the 2020 census, the population was 2,759.

== History ==
Bonifay was founded in 1882 when the Pensacola and Atlantic Railroad was built across the Florida Panhandle, and was named by P&A executive W. D. Chipley for Frank Bonifay, member of a prominent family who had a brick-making factory in Pensacola where the P&A was headquartered. Frank Bonifay bought a stake in the P&A, which in 1891 was merged into the Louisville and Nashville Railroad, which after several more mergers became part of CSX Transportation in 1986.

It was officially incorporated as a municipality in 1886, as the "Town of Bonifay", and was reincorporated as the City of Bonifay in 1921.

== Geography ==
Bonifay is located in southeastern Holmes County.

U.S. Route 90 (US-90) runs through the southern part of the downtown area, leading east 9 miles (14 km) to Chipley and west 8 miles (13 km) to Caryville. Interstate 10 (I-10) passes through the southern edge of town, with access from Exit 112–Florida State Road 79 (SR 79). I-10 leads east 91 miles (146 km) to Tallahassee and west 105 miles (169 km) to Pensacola. SR 79 (Waukesha Street) connects I-10 and US-90 and passes through the center of Bonifay, leading north 13 miles (21 km) to Esto and south 12 miles (19 km) to Vernon.

According to the United States Census Bureau, the city has a total area of 4.1 square miles (10.7 km^{2}), of which 0.1 square miles (0.2 km^{2}), or 1.73%, are water.

=== Climate ===
The climate for the City of Bonifay is characterized by hot, humid summers and generally mild to cool winters. According to the Köppen Climate Classification system, Bonifay has a humid subtropical climate zone, abbreviated "Cfa" on climate maps.

== Demographics ==
Historical population
Census	Pop.	Note	%±
1910	922		—
1920	1,230		33.4%
1930	1,292		5.0%
1940	1,924		48.9%
1950	2,252		17.0%
1960	2,222		−1.3%
1970	2,068		−6.9%
1980	2,534		22.5%
1990	2,612		3.1%
2000	4,078		56.1%
2010	2,793		−31.5%
2020	2,759		−1.2%
U.S. Decennial Census

=== Racial and ethnic composition ===
Bonifay racial composition (Hispanics excluded from racial categories) (NH = Non-Hispanic)
Race	Pop 2010	Pop 2020	% 2010	% 2020
White (NH)	2,329	2,158	83.39%	78.22%
Black or African American (NH)	279	293	9.99%	10.62%
Native American or Alaska Native (NH)	24	15	0.86%	0.54%
Asian (NH)	24	34	0.86%	1.23%
Pacific Islander or Native Hawaiian (NH)	2	2	0.07%	0.07%
Some other race (NH)	2	3	0.07%	0.11%
Two or more races/Multiracial (NH)	66	154	2.36%	5.58%
Hispanic or Latino (any race)	67	100	2.40%	3.62%
Total	2,793	2,759		

=== 2020 census ===
As of the 2020 census, Bonifay had a population of 2,759. The median age was 40.6 years. 24.1% of residents were under the age of 18 and 23.7% were 65 years of age or older. For every 100 females there were 83.0 males, and for every 100 females age 18 and over there were 80.4 males age 18 and over.

0.0% of residents lived in urban areas, while 100.0% lived in rural areas.

There were 1,060 households, 31.6% of which had children under the age of 18 living in them. Of all households, 32.8% were married-couple households, 22.3% had a male householder with no spouse or partner present, and 38.4% had a female householder with no spouse or partner present. About 36.3% of all households were made up of individuals, and 16.4% had someone living alone who was 65 years of age or older.

There were 1,244 housing units, of which 14.8% were vacant. The homeowner vacancy rate was 2.8% and the rental vacancy rate was 7.6%.

According to the 2020 American Community Survey 5-year estimates, there were 664 families residing in the city.

=== 2010 census ===
As of the 2010 United States census, there were 2,793 people, 1,130 households, and 618 families residing in the city.

In 2010, there were 1,090 households, out of which 33.6% had children under the age of 18 living with them, 36.1% were headed by married couples living together, 19.5% had a female householder with no husband present, and 39.5% were non-families. 34.4% of all households were made up of individuals, and 16.8% were someone living alone who was 65 years of age or older. The average household size was 2.41, and the average family size was 3.05.

In 2010, in the city, 25.1% of the population were under the age of 18, 8.6% were from 18 to 24, 20.6% were from 25 to 44, 25.3% were from 45 to 64, and 20.3% were 65 years of age or older. The median age was 40.8 years. For every 100 females, there were 84.7 males. For every 100 females age 18 and over, there were 77.4 males.

For the period of 2011-2015, the estimated median annual income for a household in the city was $25,060, and the median income for a family was $37,407. Male full-time workers had a median income of $41,458 versus $35,054 for females. The per capita income for the city was $15,830. About 20.7% of families and 28.8% of the population were below the poverty line, including 26.5% of those under age 18 and 14.8% of those age 65 or over.

== Education ==
Holmes District School Board operates public schools. Bonifay is home to three schools Bonifay K-8 School, Holmes County High School and Bethlehem School.

A 2004 study by the Bureau of Secondary Education showed that 56.73% of Holmes County high school graduates go on to secondary education. Of these, 38.03% of those go on to complete a bachelor's degree, furthermore 12.60% of these students who receive a bachelors go on to receive a masters or doctoral degree. As of August 2008, all educational facility improvements shall be done in a financially feasible manner to address all Level of Service (LOS) needs as described by the Public School Facilities Element in the City of Bonifay 2020 Comprehensive Plan, officially recognized by the state of Florida on September 3, 2008.

As of 2016, Bonifay K–8 school was being built to replace Bonifay Elementary School and Bonifay Middle School. Construction began in 2015, and it was completed in May 2017.

Holmes County Public Library is located in Bonifay.

== Infrastructure ==
While growth of the town of Bonifay has recently been stagnant there is promise of growth in the near future, with Florida State Road 79 being converted in to a four lane highway between Bonifay and Panama City Beach. There are currently plans to extend the commercial zone areas of Bonifay south of Interstate 10 to the Washington County line.

== Notable people ==
- Nancy Springer, prolific author of children's fiction, lives in Bonifay
- Georgia Boy Williams, state legislator

== Newspapers ==
- Holmes County Times-Advertiser

== Gallery ==
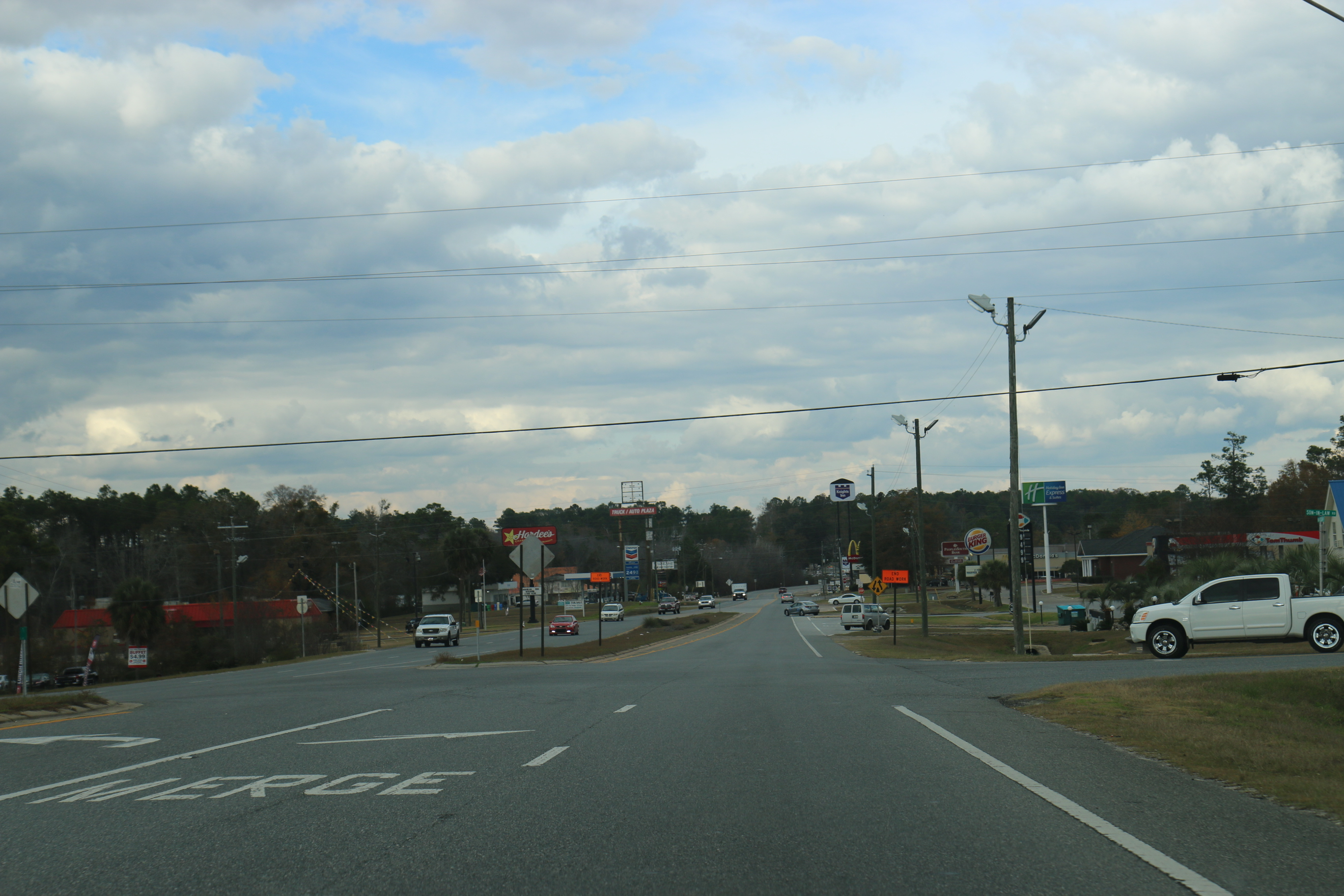
Bonifay businesses near Interstate 10 (Florida State Road 79)

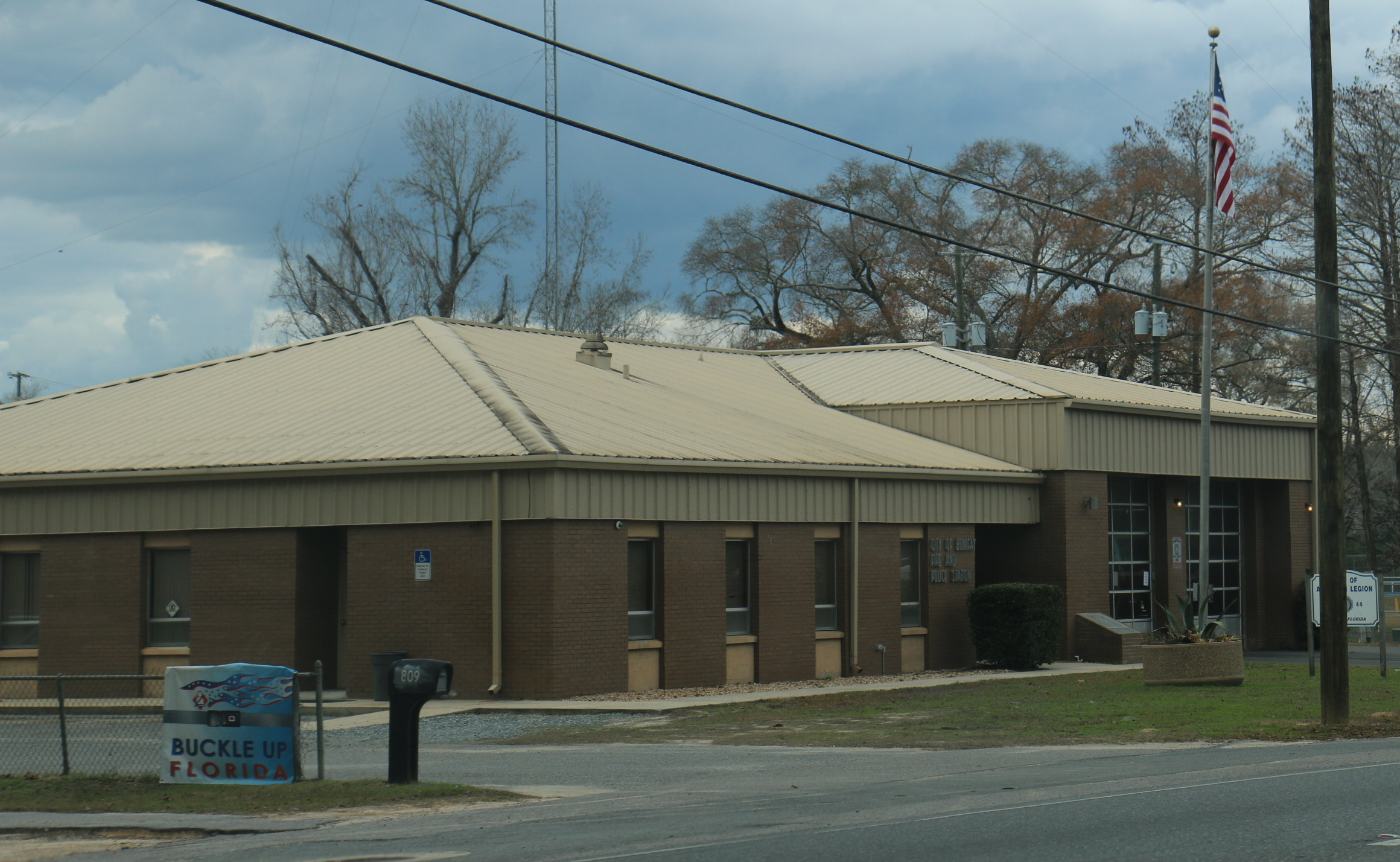
Bonifay Fire and Police Station
