= Holmes District School Board =

School district in Florida, United States

Address
- 701 East Pennsylvania Avenue Bonifay, Florida, 32425; United States

District information
- Type: Public
- Grades: PreK–12
- NCES District ID: 1200900

Students and staff
- Students: 3,131
- Teachers: 191.55
- Staff: 215.42
- Student–teacher ratio: 16.35

Other information
- Website: www.hdsb.org

Holmes District School Board (HDSB) is a school district headquartered in Bonifay, Florida.

It is the only school district covering Holmes County.

== Schools ==
High schools:

- Holmes County High School
- Ponce de Leon High School

Elementary:

- Ponce de Leon Elementary School

Other:

- Bethlehem School
- Bonifay K-8 school
- Poplar Springs School
- The GAP
