= Alabama State Route 193 =

State highway in Alabama, United States

State Route 193
- Dauphin Island Parkway; Range Line Road

Route information
- Maintained by ALDOT
- Length: 26.349 mi (42.405 km)

Major junctions
- South end: SR 180 / Fort Morgan Ferry Terminal in Dauphin Island
- SR 188 in Alabama Port; SR 163 in Theodore; I-10 in Tillmans Corner
- North end: US 90 in Tillmans Corner

Location
- Country: United States
- State: Alabama
- Counties: Mobile

Highway system
- Alabama State Highway System; Interstate; US; State
← SR 192	→ SR 195

State Route 193 (SR 193) is a 26.581-mile-long (42.778 km) route that serves as the primary travel route into Dauphin Island through southern Mobile County. South of its intersection with Laurendine Road, SR 193 is known as Dauphin Island Parkway, with the northern half of Dauphin Island Parkway routed along SR 163. The northern portion of SR 193 is known as Range Line Road.

== Route description ==
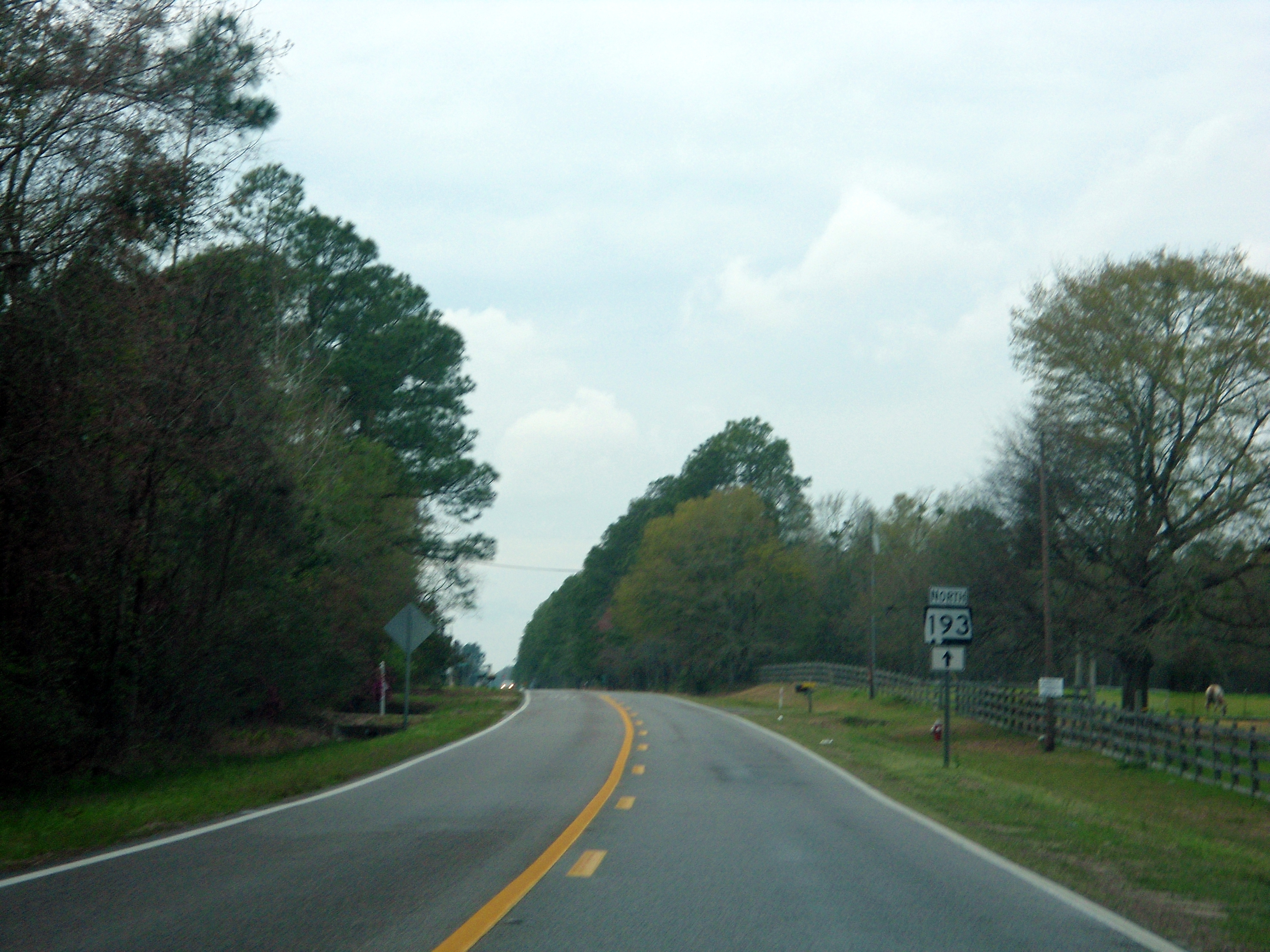
State Route 193 runs north

The southern terminus of SR 193 is located at the western terminus of the Fort Morgan ferry in eastern Dauphin Island. From this point, the route travels in a westerly direction before turning to the north off the island across the Gordon Persons Bridge spanning the Mississippi Sound. From this point, the route travels across Mon Louis Island, over Fowl River, and continues onward in a northerly direction, where it has a full cloverleaf interchange with I-10 at exit 17 before reaching its northern terminus at US 90 in Tillmans Corner.

== History ==
SR 193 originated as a state highway designation for Wilson Avenue from US 43 to US 45 in Prichard, which was decommissioned in 1981 along with SR 194 (which was relocated elsewhere by 1987). The number was used again by 1985 on the current route.

== Major intersections ==
The entire route is in Mobile County.

Location	mi	km	Destinations	Notes
Dauphin Island	0.000	0.000	Fort Morgan Ferry Terminal to SR 180 – Fort Morgan	Southern terminus
Dauphin Island			Dauphin Island Bridge	
Alabama Port	7.879	12.680	SR 188 west – Bayou La Batre	Eastern terminus of SR 188
Theodore	21.902	35.248	SR 163 north – Mobile Middle Bay Port	Southern terminus of SR 163
Tillmans Corner	25.523	41.075	I-10 – Mobile, Pascagoula	I-10 exit 17
Tillmans Corner	26.349	42.405	US 90 (SR 16) – Grand Bay, Mobile	Northern terminus
1.000 mi = 1.609 km; 1.000 km = 0.621 mi
