= Alabama State Route 163 =

State highway in Alabama, United States

State Route 163
- Dauphin Island Parkway

Route information
- Maintained by ALDOT
- Length: 11.104 mi (17.870 km)

Major junctions
- South end: SR 193 in Theodore
- I-10 in Mobile
- North end: US 90 in Mobile

Location
- Country: United States
- State: Alabama
- Counties: Mobile

Highway system
- Alabama State Highway System; Interstate; US; State
← SR 162	→ SR 164

State Route 163 (SR 163) is a 11.104-mile (17.870 km) state highway that serves as a north–south connection between Mobile and Theodore through Mobile County. SR 163 intersects SR 193 at its southern terminus and US 90 at its northern terminus.

== Route description ==
SR 163 begins at its intersection with SR 193 in Theodore. From its terminus, SR 163 travels in a northeasterly direction on Hollingers Island and passes the Mobile Downtown Airport en route to its intersection with I-10. From its junction with I-10, SR 163 continues in a northerly direction to its northern terminus at Government Street in central Mobile.

== Major intersections ==
The entire route is in Mobile County.

Location	mi	km	Destinations	Notes
Theodore	0.0	0.0	SR 193 (Rangeline Road) – Dauphin Island, Tillmans Corner	Southern terminus
Mobile	8.621	13.874	I-10 – Pascagoula, Pensacola	I-10 Exit 22
Mobile	11.104	17.870	US 90 (Government Street/SR 16) – Downtown, Tillmans Corner	Northern terminus
1.000 mi = 1.609 km; 1.000 km = 0.621 mi
