= Jo Ann Jenkins =

American CEO of AARP

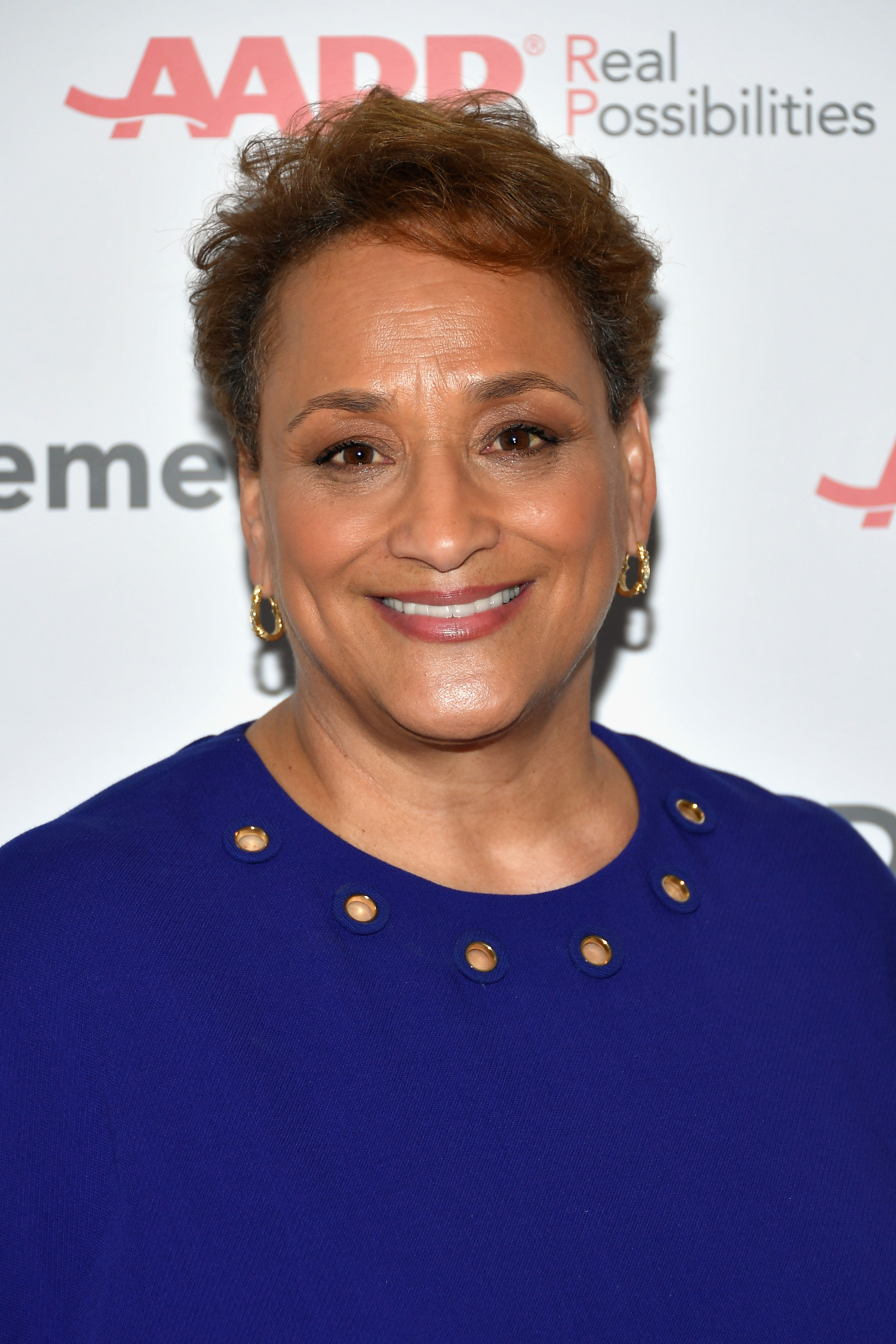
- Jenkins in 2018
- Born: February 8, 1958 (age 68); Mon Louis Island, Alabama, U.S.
- Education: Spring Hill College (BA)
- Spouse: Frank Jenkins
- Children: 2

Jo Ann Jenkins (born February 8, 1958) is the former CEO of AARP. She was appointed on September 1, 2014, having previously served as chief operating officer from 2013 to 2014. She retired from the role at the end of 2024. Between 1994 and 2010, she was a senior adviser, chief of staff, and chief operating officer of the Library of Congress.

== Early life and education ==
A native of Mon Louis Island, Alabama, Jenkins graduated from Theodore High School in Theodore, Alabama, in 1976 and went on to attend Spring Hill College. where she majored in political science.

== Career ==
After graduating from Spring Hill College in 1980, she became a voter outreach worker on Ronald Reagan's 1980 Presidential Campaign. Following the campaign in 1981, she began working as an executive assistant at the U.S. Department of Housing and Urban Development and later moved to the U.S. Department of Transportation, where she served as special assistant to U.S. Secretary of Transportation Elizabeth Dole from 1985 to 1987. In this role, Jenkins and Dole led an effort to bring women into leadership positions across the DOT. She spent three years in the private sector as a partner for quality management services from 1987 to 1990. Jenkins then joined the U.S. Department of Agriculture as director of the department's Office of Advocacy and Enterprise, a position she held from 1990 to 1993.

=== Library of Congress ===
Between 1994 and 2010, Jenkins was a senior adviser, chief of staff, and Chief Operating Officer of the Library of Congress. In 2001 she worked with then-first lady Laura Bush and Librarian of Congress James H. Billington to launch the National Book Festival, an annual intergenerational event that promotes reading and literacy by bringing in authors, illustrators and poets for presentations, talks and book signings. The festival grew to become a large-scale event, with more than 200,000 people attending in 2016. In 2008 she developed the Library of Congress Experience, which digitized important written works including the Declaration of Independence, the Bill of Rights, and the Constitution of the United States. This allowed people visiting the library to compare the rough drafts of these founding documents with their final versions, showing edits, corrections and margin notes made by key authors including Thomas Jefferson, Benjamin Franklin, and John Adams.

=== AARP ===
Jenkins joined AARP in 2010 as president of AARP Foundation, the organization's affiliated charity. In this role, she focused the foundation on four areas of work affecting Americans age 50 and up: income insecurity, housing, isolation and hunger. She created a program with NASCAR driver Jeff Gordon called Drive to End Hunger, which drew attention to the issue of food insecurity among older Americans by donating 36 million meals and providing funding to more than 100 organizations fighting hunger in the U.S.

Following one year as chief operating officer, Jenkins was appointed CEO in 2014. According to The Washington Post, Jenkins "fundamentally recast the organization’s mission" based on the trend of longevity. AARP was originally formed to serve people approaching and in retirement but she observed that as Americans are living longer they are working longer and are eschewing previous generations' definition of what lifestyles they choose to live at and beyond age 50. She described this shift, saying "we know that people who continue to work or even volunteer can live longer than people who don't. So all those misperceptions of what people want when they retire or what they want to do in their older life I think is being totally torn apart by the idea that people are going to live longer, healthier — and hopefully in better financial shape — than they had in the past." Under Jenkins' tenure close to half of AARP's 38 million members are still working full- or part-time, representing her strategy to evolve AARP as Boomers and Generation Xers desire and need to continue working longer than their parents' generations. She oversaw the introduction of new benefits designed to help AARP members find work at employers with age-friendly employment practices and continued the organization's involvement in advancing legislation to strengthen federal age discrimination laws.

In March 2024, Jenkins announced she would retire as CEO at the end of the year. She was succeeded in November 2024 by Myechia Minter-Jordan.
