= Alabama State Route 188 =

State highway in Alabama, United States

State Route 188

Route information
- Maintained by ALDOT
- Length: 19.686 mi (31.682 km)

Major junctions
- West end: I-10 / CR 11 in Grand Bay
- US 90 in Grand Bay
- East end: SR 193 in Alabama Port

Location
- Country: United States
- State: Alabama
- Counties: Mobile

Highway system
- Alabama State Highway System; Interstate; US; State
| ← SR 187 | → SR 189 |

State Route 188 (SR 188) is a 19.686-mile (31.682 km) state highway that serves as an east-west connection through southern Mobile County. SR 188 intersects Interstate 10 (I-10) at its western terminus and SR 193 at its eastern terminus.

== Route description ==
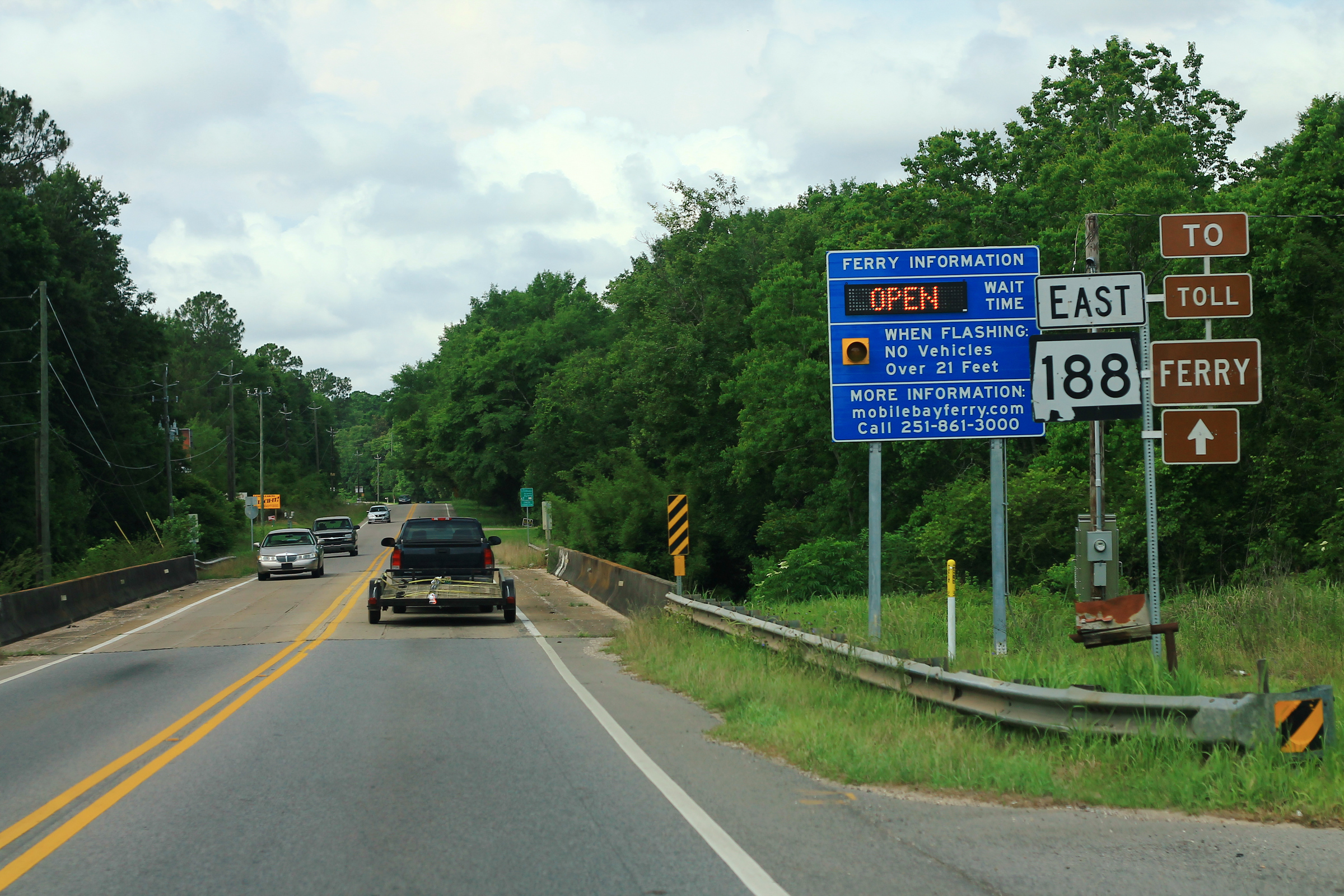
State Route 188 south of I-10

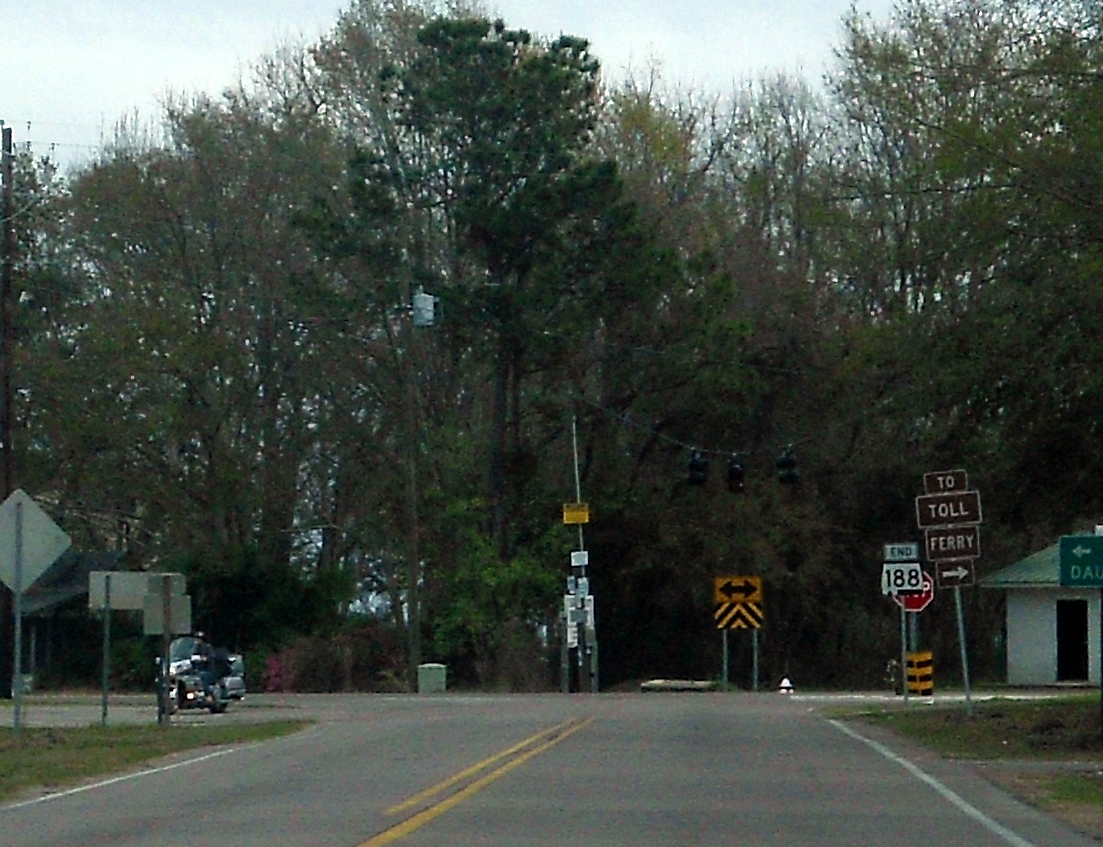
Eastern terminus

SR 188 begins just north of its intersection with I-10 just north of Grand Bay. From this point, the route travels in a southerly direction through a brief concurrency with US 90 before taking a southeasterly course upon leaving Grand Bay. SR 188 continues its southeasterly course just prior to reaching Bayou La Batre where it turns to the south and remains in a north-south orientation. Upon its exit from Bayou La Batre, SR 188 returns to its easterly course to pass through Coden and Heron Bay before reaching its eastern terminus at SR 193 in Alabama Port.

== Major intersections ==
The entire route is in Mobile County.

| Location | mi | km | Destinations | Notes |
|---|---|---|---|---|
| Grand Bay | 0.000– 0.126 | 0.000– 0.203 | I-10 / CR 11 north (Grand Bay Wilmer Road) – Pascagoula, Mobile | I-10 exit 4; western terminus; road continues north as CR 11 |
| Grand Bay | 1.491 | 2.400 | US 90 west (SR 16 west) – Pascagoula | Beginning of brief US 90 concurrency |
| Grand Bay | 1.670 | 2.688 | US 90 east (SR 16 east) – Mobile | End of brief US 90 concurrency |
| Alabama Port | 19.686 | 31.682 | SR 193 (Dauphin Island Parkway) – Tillmans Corner, Dauphin Island | Eastern terminus |
1.000 mi = 1.609 km; 1.000 km = 0.621 mi: Concurrency terminus
