= Mon Louis Island =

Island on the coast of the U.S. state of Alabama

Coordinates: 30°22′02.8″N 88°08′26.0″W

Mon Louis Island, originally known as Isle aux Maraguans or Miragoine, is an island on the coast of the U.S. state of Alabama, south of Mobile in southeastern Mobile County. It has an average elevation of 7 feet (2.1 m). Roughly 2 miles (3.2 km) wide and 6 miles (9.7 km) long, it is bounded by Fowl River on the north and west, Mobile Bay on the east, and the Mississippi Sound on the south. Mon Louis is traversed by Alabama State Route 193, which travels in a north to south direction along the eastern edge of the island. The Gordon Persons Bridge on the southern end of Route 193 connects the island to Dauphin Island. The unincorporated communities of Alabama Port, Heron Bay, and Mon Louis are on the island.

== History ==
Mon Louis Island was first settled in the early 18th century by French Louisiana colonists. Nicholas Baudin, Sieur de Miragouane, received a land grant on November 12, 1710. Baudin was from Rochefort, France, having come to Mobile in 1706 at the age of 20. He established a settlement on the island's northern end known as Miragouane. The island eventually came to be called Mon Louis, in honor of his son Louis Alexandre Baudin, known as mon Louis ("my Louis"). By the 19th century, the island was populated by people from various countries and Creoles, along with a mix of ethnic groups.

== Mon Louis Island Creole ==
Until around 1950, Mon Louis Island Creole, a French-based creole language related to Louisiana Creole, was commonly spoken on Mon Louis Island. When the British captured Mobile from the French in 1763, most white French colonists left for Louisiana or elsewhere in the French empire. But a version of French survived on Mon Louis Island among its mixed-race population, which largely comprised free craftsmen and their families. The creole was first attested in the academic literature by Margaret M. Marshall of Southeastern Louisiana University in 1991, based on interviews conducted about a decade earlier, when she published research on the last two fluent speakers of Mon Louis Island Creole, sisters Christine Durette and Odessa Collins; their parents had been the last two monolingual speakers of the language. The sisters were the great-great-granddaughters of Maximilien Colin, a free Black man who founded the Creole settlement on the island's northeast side circa 1820. Collins died in 1982, Durette in 1984.
