= Hanford Dixon =

American football player (born 1958)

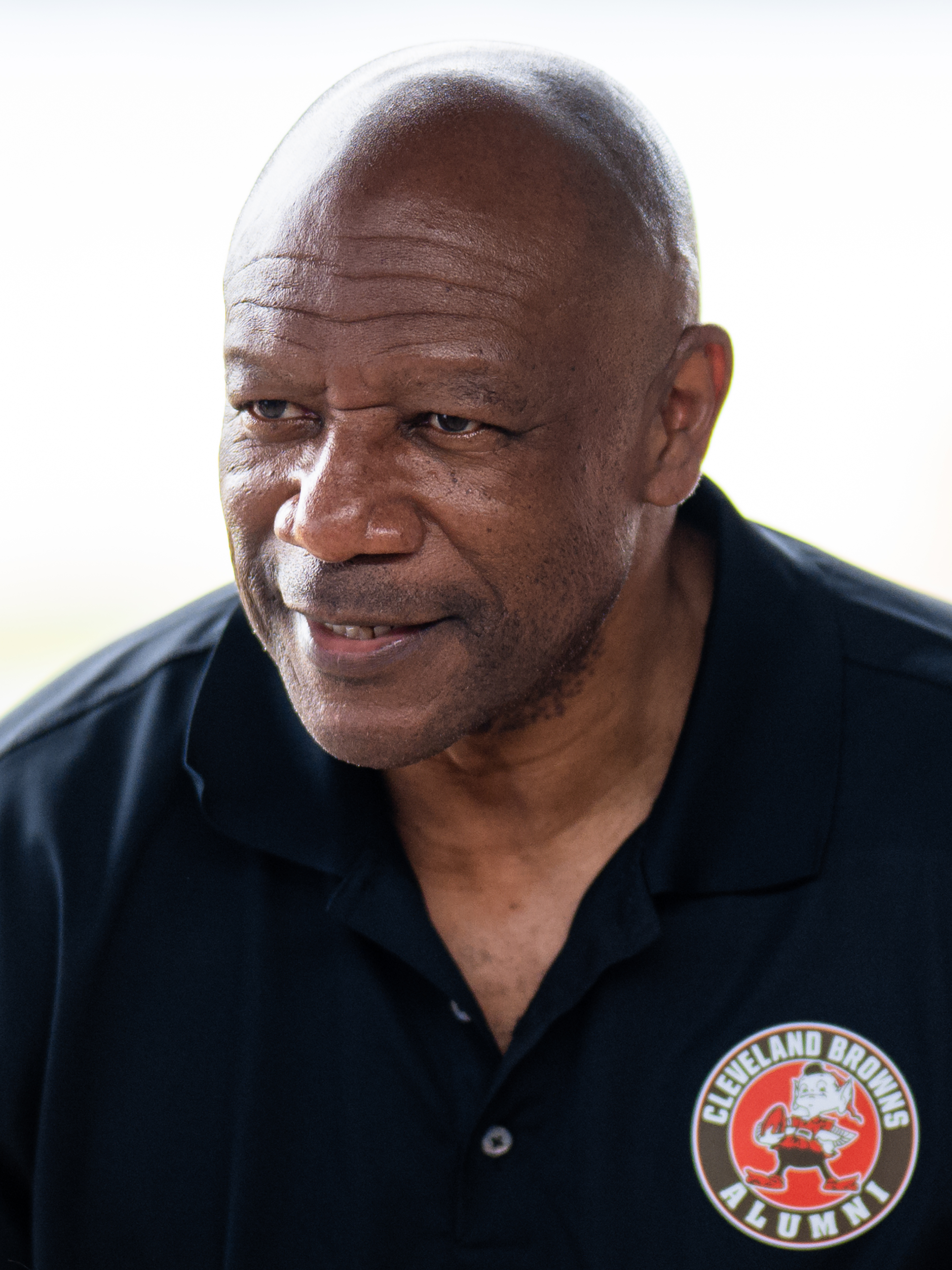
- Dixon in 2023

No. 29
- Position: Cornerback

Personal information
- Born: December 25, 1958 (age 67); Mobile, Alabama, U.S.
- Listed height: 5 ft 11 in (1.80 m)
- Listed weight: 186 lb (84 kg)

Career information
- High school: Theodore (Theodore, Alabama)
- College: Southern Miss
- NFL draft: 1981: 1st round, 22nd overall pick

Career history
- Cleveland Browns (1981–1989); San Francisco 49ers (1990)*
- * Offseason or practice squad member only

Awards and highlights
- 2× First-team All-Pro (1986, 1987); 3× Pro Bowl (1986–1988); Cleveland Browns Legends

Career NFL statistics
- Interceptions: 26
- Interception yards: 225
- Sacks: 2
- Stats at Pro Football Reference

Hanford Dixon (born December 25, 1958) is an American former professional football player who spent his entire career (1981–1989) as a cornerback for the Cleveland Browns of the National Football League (NFL). He played college football for the Southern Miss Golden Eagles and was selected by the Browns with the 22nd pick in the first round of the 1981 NFL draft. Dixon made the Pro Bowl three times, in 1986, 1987 and 1988. He also is credited with naming the Cleveland Browns "Dawg Pound," the section of the stadium known for their antics during Browns home games at the old Municipal Stadium inspired by Dixon's "barking" to teammates, especially fellow cornerback Frank Minnifield.

Dixon and Minnifield were selected by NFL.com as the No 2 "Best Cornerback Tandem of All-Time." Dixon has been honored many times by his alma mater including being inducted into the M-Club Alumni Association Sports Hall of Fame in 1988 and being named to the school's Football Team of the Century. He became the seventh football member of the school's Legends Club joining Reggie Collier, Brett Favre, Ray Guy, Derrick Nix, Sammy Winder and Fred Cook.

On October 29, 2017, Dixon attended the 4th London International Series Game in London, U.K.

Dixon remains a visible presence on the football front in Cleveland, as he is a football analyst for WOIO-TV 19 (CBS) in Cleveland, and the color analyst for the high school football game of the week on FS Ohio. He has a podcast with Cleveland personality Gab Kreuz called "The Hanford Dixon Show" on the BIGPLAY Network.

Dixon was the head coach of the Lingerie Football League's Cleveland Crush.

== Personal life ==
Dixon is married and has two sons Kyle and Hanford Jr, and two daughters Marva and Hanna.
