= Bessie Morse Bellingrath =

American philanthropist in Alabama

Bessie Morse Bellingrath (1878 – 1943) was an Alabama philanthropist known for developing the Bellingrath Gardens and Home, the historic home of Bessie Morse Bellingrath and her husband, Mobile Coca-Cola Company president Walter Bellingrath. Bellingrath is remembered for her work creating the Bellingrath Gardens, as well as her private philanthropy during the depression. She would pay people hundreds of dollars in exchange for a plant in their gardens, an afghan blanket she saw in a shop, or an overpriced antique. She was an honorary member-at-large of the Garden Clubs of America, and has been inducted into the Alabama Women's Hall of Fame.

== Early life ==
Bellingrath was born Bessie Mae Morse in Mobile, Alabama in 1878. Her parents were Sewell and Alice Morse; she was one of nine children in the family. She studied the arts before becoming a stenographer at the Mobile Coca-Cola Company. She went on to marry Walter Duncan Bellingrath (1869–1965), the founder of Mobile's Coca-Cola bottling company. He was a native of Atlanta and was raised in Castleberry, Alabama. His father Leonhard Bellingrath came from Lennep, Remscheid, Germany.

In addition to the bottling plant, Walter D. Bellingrath founded or owned several other companies including a tile company, a steamship company, and a warehousing company. Bessie left her job as a stenographer when she married him in 1906, and turned her attention to cultivating gardens at the couple's South Ann Street home in Mobile. Her love of azaleas in particular became the basis for Mobile's Azalea Trail. She died in 1943. After her death, Walter devoted the rest of his life to developing and expanding the gardens.

== Home and gardens ==
Bellingrath bought a riverside property to be used as a fishing hole and named it Belle Camp. He later suggested that she develop the property. She planted azaleas and camellias there, and eventually built the property into a large garden with a 15-room Renaissance mansion: the Bellingrath Home. Bessie was known for buying plants from struggling locals during the Great Depression, overpaying them because of the economic hardship of the era. She would tell people that she had been looking for that exact flower and that it had been hard to obtain, even when it was a very common plant.

== Death and legacy ==
Bellingrath died in 1943, at the age of 64. In 1950, her husband, Walter, created the Bellingrath-Morse Foundation to maintain the home and gardens and keep them open to the public.
