= Bellingrath Gardens and Home =

Historic house in Alabama, United States

- U.S. National Register of Historic Places
- U.S. Historic district
- Alabama Register of Landmarks and Heritage
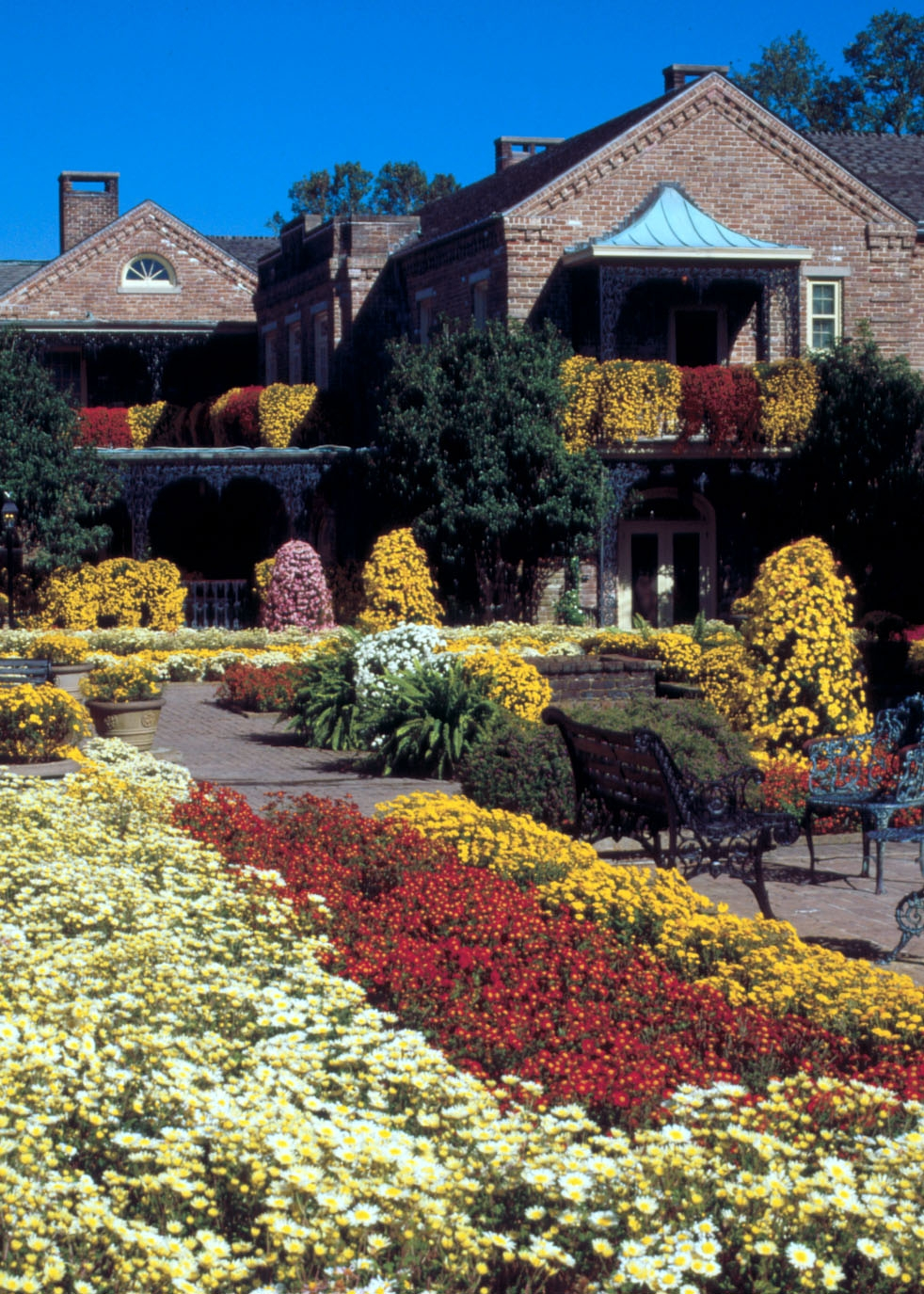
- The Bellingrath Home

- Location within Alabama Location within the United States
- Location: 12401 Bellingrath Gardens Road; Theodore, Alabama
- Coordinates: 30°25′49″N 88°8′26″W
- Area: 65 acres (26 ha)
- Built: 1925-1949
- Architectural style: 20th Century Revival
- Website: bellingrath.org
- NRHP reference No.: 82001609

Significant dates
- Added to NRHP: October 19, 1982
- Designated ARLH: September 14, 1977

Bellingrath Gardens and Home is the 65-acre (26 ha) public garden and historic home of Walter and Bessie Bellingrath, located on the Fowl River near Mobile, Alabama, United States. Walter Bellingrath was one of the first Coca-Cola bottlers in the Southeast, and with his wealth built the estate garden and home. He and his wife, Bessie, lived in the home which has since been converted into a museum. The gardens opened to the public in 1932. The site was listed on the Alabama Register of Landmarks and Heritage on September 14, 1977, and on the National Register of Historic Places on October 19, 1982.

== Gardens ==
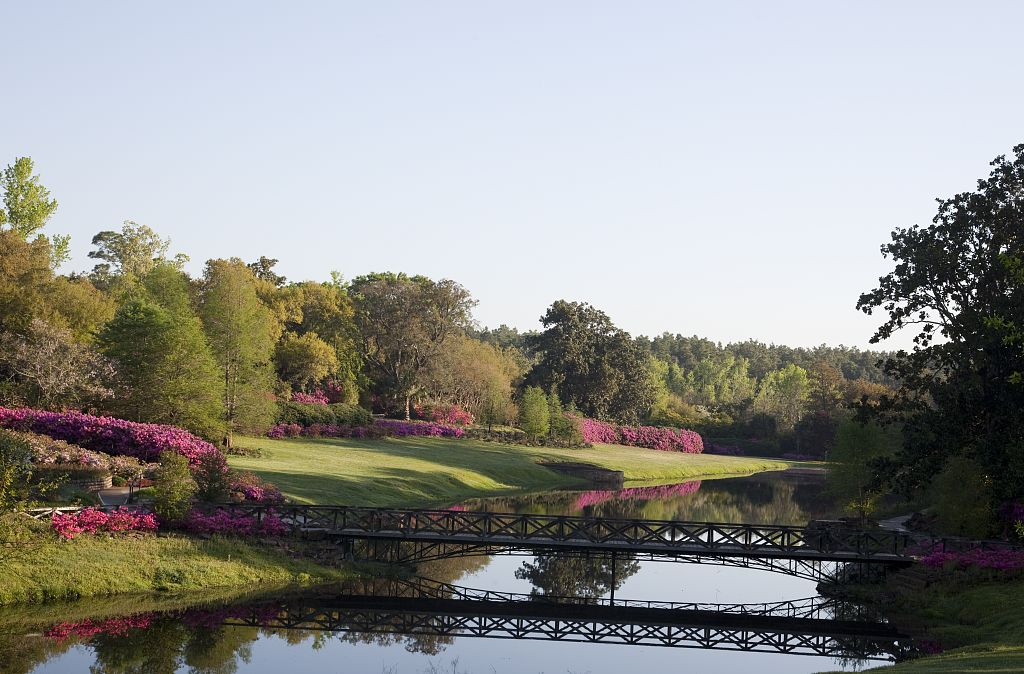
Azaleas in bloom from across Mirror Lake

The Bellingrath Gardens and Home property encompasses approximately 900 acres (360 ha) along the Fowl River, 65 acres (26 ha) of which are cultivated gardens. The gardens feature cabbage palmettos, live oaks, camellias, azaleas, roses, and chrysanthemums year round. Plants featured in winter are tulips, snapdragons, pansies, ornamental cabbage and kale, daffodils, poppies, primroses, and many varieties of narcissus. Plants featured in spring include more than 250,000 azaleas, hydrangeas, Easter lilies, impatiens, salvia, fuchsia, and Pelargonium geraniums. Plants featured in summer are the more than 2,000 roses, allamandas, hibiscus, copper plants, begonias, ornamental peppers, bougainvillea, caladiums, coleus, vinca, and marigolds. Plants featured in fall are over 8,000 bedded, potted and cascading chrysanthemums, hibiscus, and copper plants.

== History ==
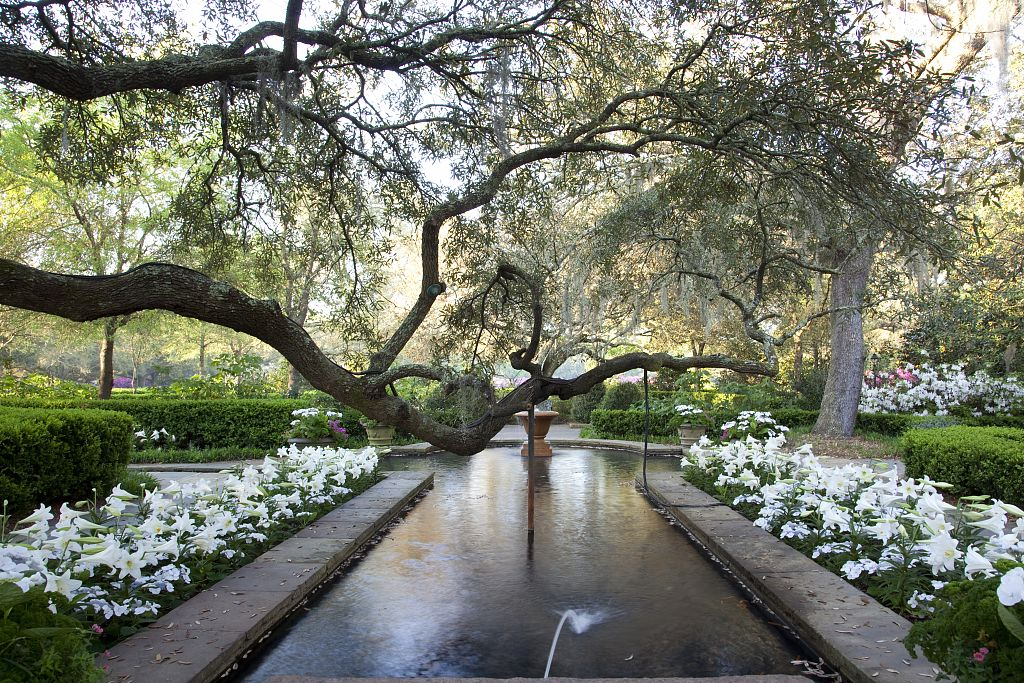
Water feature in the formal gardens

The property on which the gardens would eventually be constructed were purchased in 1917 as a fishing camp by Walter Bellingrath, president of the local Coca-Cola bottling plant. Bellingrath bought the property to balance his work-life schedule. The transformation from the "Belle Camp" fishing post into what is now Bellingrath Gardens and Home is largely thanks to Bessie Mae Morse Bellingrath, who had married Walter in 1906. Mrs. Bellingrath began developing the gardens with architect George Bigelow Rogers in 1927. The home was completed in 1935, encompasses 10,500 square feet (980 m^{2}) and features hand-made brick salvaged in Mobile from the 1852 birthplace of Alva Smith Vanderbilt Belmont. Ironwork was obtained from the demolished circa 1837 Southern Hotel, also in Mobile. The house design borrowed elements from many traditions and eras. Some of the most obvious are a formal Georgian staircase reminiscent of an English country house, French doors, and a Mediterranean courtyard.

Walter and Bessie Morse Bellingrath opened their gardens to the public for the first time on April 7, 1932. The home opened to the general public as a museum in 1956, after the 1955 death of Mr. Bellingrath at the age of 86, and features all of its original furnishings from Mrs. Bellingrath.

The Bellingraths had no children, and after Bessie's death in 1943 Walter dedicated the rest of his life to work on the gardens she had worked so hard to create. In 1950, Walter D. Bellingrath founded the Bellingrath-Morse Foundation at the age of 80. The foundation benefits Rhodes College in Memphis, Tennessee, Stillman College in Tuscaloosa, Alabama, and Huntingdon College in Montgomery, Alabama, as well as Bellingrath's church, Central Presbyterian, and his wife's family's St. Francis Street Methodist; these institutions receive approximately 80% of the foundation's earnings. Although the gardens receive income from the Bellingrath-Morse Foundation, two-thirds of current operations are financed by admissions, gift shop and restaurant sales, membership, and donations.

== Christmas ==
Bellingrath Gardens celebrates the Christmas season with a display of over 3 million lights that is known as the "Magic Christmas in Lights". The light show began in 1995; it runs from the Friday after Thanksgiving through New Year's Eve. It features over 3 million lights with 1,000 set pieces in 13 themed scenes spaced around the estate. USA Today included Bellingrath's Magic Christmas in Lights on its 2014 list of the "10 Best Public Light Displays in America"; votes from online readers put Bellingrath in sixth place.

== Awards ==
- On December 15, 2014, USA Today included Bellingrath Gardens and Home's Magic Christmas in Lights on its list of the "10 Best Public Light Displays in America"; votes from online readers put Bellingrath in sixth place.
- On June 4, 2015, Dr. William E. Barrick was selected to receive the American Horticultural Society's 2015 Liberty Hyde Bailey Award. Barrick served as the executive director of the Gardens from 1999 to 2019.

== In popular culture ==
Bellingrath Gardens are mentioned in the 1962 film To Kill a Mockingbird by Atticus Finch. The gardens at Bellingrath are referenced as the model gardens at the time the story was set in 1936.

== See also ==
- List of botanical gardens and arboretums in Alabama
