= C. J. Mosley (linebacker) =

American football player (born 1992)

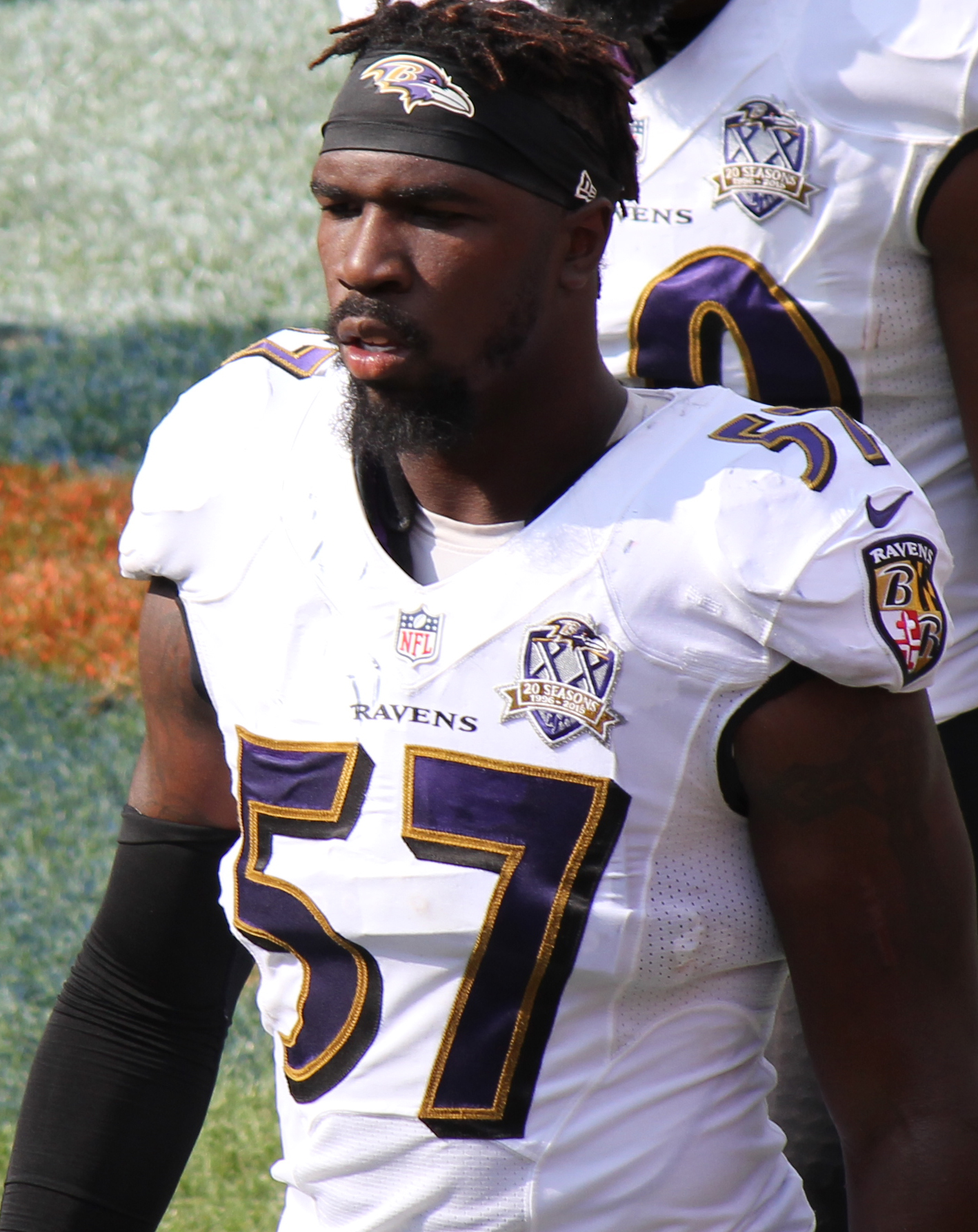
- Mosley with the Baltimore Ravens in 2015

No. 57
- Position: Linebacker

Personal information
- Born: June 19, 1992 (age 34); Theodore, Alabama, U.S.
- Listed height: 6 ft 2 in (1.88 m)
- Listed weight: 231 lb (105 kg)

Career information
- High school: Theodore
- College: Alabama (2010–2013)
- NFL draft: 2014: 1st round, 17th overall pick

Career history
- Baltimore Ravens (2014–2018); New York Jets (2019–2024)

Awards and highlights
- 5× Second-team All-Pro (2014, 2016–2018, 2022); 5× Pro Bowl (2014, 2016–2018, 2022); PFWA All-Rookie Team (2014); 2× BCS national champion (2011, 2012); Butkus Award (2013); Unanimous All-American (2013); Consensus All-American (2012); SEC Defensive Player of the Year (2013); 2× First-team All-SEC (2012, 2013)

Career NFL statistics
- Total tackles: 1,083
- Sacks: 12
- Interceptions: 12
- Pass deflections: 53
- Forced fumbles: 10
- Fumble recoveries: 9
- Defensive touchdowns: 3
- Stats at Pro Football Reference

Clint Mosley Jr. (born June 19, 1992) is an American former professional football player who was a linebacker in the National Football League (NFL). He played college football for the Alabama Crimson Tide, and was selected by the Baltimore Ravens in the first round of the 2014 NFL draft. Mosley made four Pro Bowls as a member of the Ravens, and made another as a member of the Jets.

== Early life ==
A native of Theodore, Alabama, Mosley attended Theodore High School, where he played football, basketball, and ran track. As a sophomore, he was credited with 112 tackles, four sacks, and one interception, as the Bobcats finished with a 6–5 record, losing to the Auburn High School Tigers in the opening round of the Class 6A playoffs. In his junior season, Mosley set a school record with 176 tackles, (115 solo), while also recording 17 tackles for loss, seven sacks, causing four fumbles, recovering two more, and intercepting two passes, earning an ASWA 6A All-State selection.

Improving his own school record, Mosley registered 186 tackles as a senior in 2009, also adding seven sacks, five fumble recoveries, and four interceptions. Theodore finished with a 9–2 season record, yet was upset by future Alabama teammate T. J. Yeldon's Daphne team in the first round of the playoffs. Still, Mosley earned his second consecutive ASWA 6A All-State honors, as well as Class 6A Lineman of the Year. He finished his career at Theodore as the school's all-time leading tackler, with over 500 stops in his career.

In addition, Mosley was on the school's track & field team. He ran the 110m hurdles in 16.15 seconds and the 200m dash in 24.33 seconds. In the jumping events, he got personal-best leaps of 1.80 meters in the high jump, 6.58 meters in the long jump and 12.6 meters in the triple jump. He was also a member of the 4 × 100 m relay (43.44 s) squad.

Regarded as a four-star recruit by the Rivals.com recruiting network, Mosley was listed as the sixth-ranked outside linebacker prospect in a class highlighted by five-star linebackers Jordan Hicks and Christian Jones. He was also the second-ranked player from Alabama, behind fellow Crimson Tide recruit Dee Milliner. Mosley played in the 2010 U.S. Army All-American Bowl, where he committed to Alabama during the game. He chose the Crimson Tide over Auburn, but also had offers from Florida State, Oklahoma, and Tennessee, among others.

== College career ==
Mosley was a consensus Freshman All-American in 2010 for the Crimson Tide, selected by the FWAA, Rivals.com, and College Football News after playing in all 13 games as a true freshman.

Mosley dislocated his right elbow in the first quarter of the fourth game of the 2011 season against Arkansas. He missed the following two games against Florida and Vanderbilt and did not record a tackle in the next game against Mississippi. Mosley shared the starting weak-side inside linebacker ("Will") linebacker spot with Nico Johnson in 2011 and 2012, with Alabama coaches using Mosley more in pass coverage.

The Associated Press (AP) recognized Mosley as a first-team All-American after the 2012 regular season, a year after former teammate linebacker Dont'a Hightower made the AP All-American first-team and other linebacker teammate Courtney Upshaw made the second-team. With Mosley's selection to the AP All-American team in 2012, Alabama had a linebacker on that team (first through third-teams) for four of the previous five years. Mosley led the team in tackles in 2012 with 107; sophomore Trey DePriest was second with 59 tackles. Mosley finished third for the 2012 Butkus Award (goes to the country's best linebacker) behind Notre Dame linebacker Manti Te'o and Georgia linebacker Jarvis Jones. Mosley earned Alabama's MVP award in 2012. Mosley's three career interception returns for touchdowns tied an Alabama record. Mosley indicated in December 2012 that he will return to Alabama for his senior season.

Mosley led the Alabama football team in tackles (108) for the second consecutive year in 2013, averaging the most tackles-per-game in his college career. In November 2013, he was a semifinalist for the Lombardi, Bednarik and Butkus Awards. While the Missouri Tigers' Michael Sam is often remembered as the 2013 Southeastern Conference (SEC) Defensive Player of the Year, he and Mosley actually shared the award. Mosley was again named as a first-team All-SEC selection. He was also selected to the First-team of the AP All-America Team.

== Professional career ==
=== Pre-draft ===
Prior to the NFL Combine, Mosley underwent surgery to repair a labrum issue after dislocating his hip. He attended the NFL Scouting Combine in Indianapolis, but was not able to participate in running drills as he was still recovering. Mosley completed the vertical jump, short shuttle, three-cone drill, and broad jump at the combine.

External videos
- C.J. Mosley's NFL Combine Workout

On March 12, 2014, Mosley participated at Alabama's pro day and performed the 40-yard dash (4.63s), 20-yard dash (2.70s), 10-yard dash (1.56s), and bench press (15). Multiple NFL scouts and team representatives attended Alabama's pro day, including head coaches Sean Payton (New Orleans Saints), Marvin Lewis (Cincinnati Bengals), and Chip Kelly (Philadelphia Eagles). At the conclusion of the pre-draft process, Mosley was projected to be a first round pick by NFL draft experts and scouts. He was regarded as a top 15 pick, but fell in some first round projections due to his lengthy injury history. Mosley attended pre-draft visits and private workouts for multiple teams, but received the most interest from the Buffalo Bills and Baltimore Ravens.

Pre-draft measurables
| Height | Weight | Arm length | Hand span | Wingspan | 40-yard dash | 10-yard split | 20-yard split | 20-yard shuttle | Three-cone drill | Vertical jump | Broad jump | Bench press |
|---|---|---|---|---|---|---|---|---|---|---|---|---|
| 6 ft 2 in (1.88 m) | 234 lb (106 kg) | 33 3/8 in (0.85 m) | 10 3/4 in (0.27 m) | 6 ft 7 3/8 in (2.02 m) | 4.63 s | 1.56 s | 2.70 s | 4.40 s | 7.30 s | 35.0 in (0.89 m) | 9 ft 10 in (3.00 m) | 15 reps |
40 and bench from Pro Day, all others from NFL Combine

=== Baltimore Ravens ===
==== 2014 ====
The Ravens selected Mosley in the first round (17th overall) of the 2014 NFL draft. Mosley was the fourth linebacker drafted in 2014 and became the highest linebacker drafted from Alabama since Rolando McClain went eighth overall in 2010. In addition, he was one of eight Alabama Crimson Tide players to be selected that year. On May 27, 2014, the Ravens signed Mosley to a four-year, $8.87 million contract that includes a signing bonus of $4.71 million.

External videos
- Ravens draft C.J. Mosley 17th overall

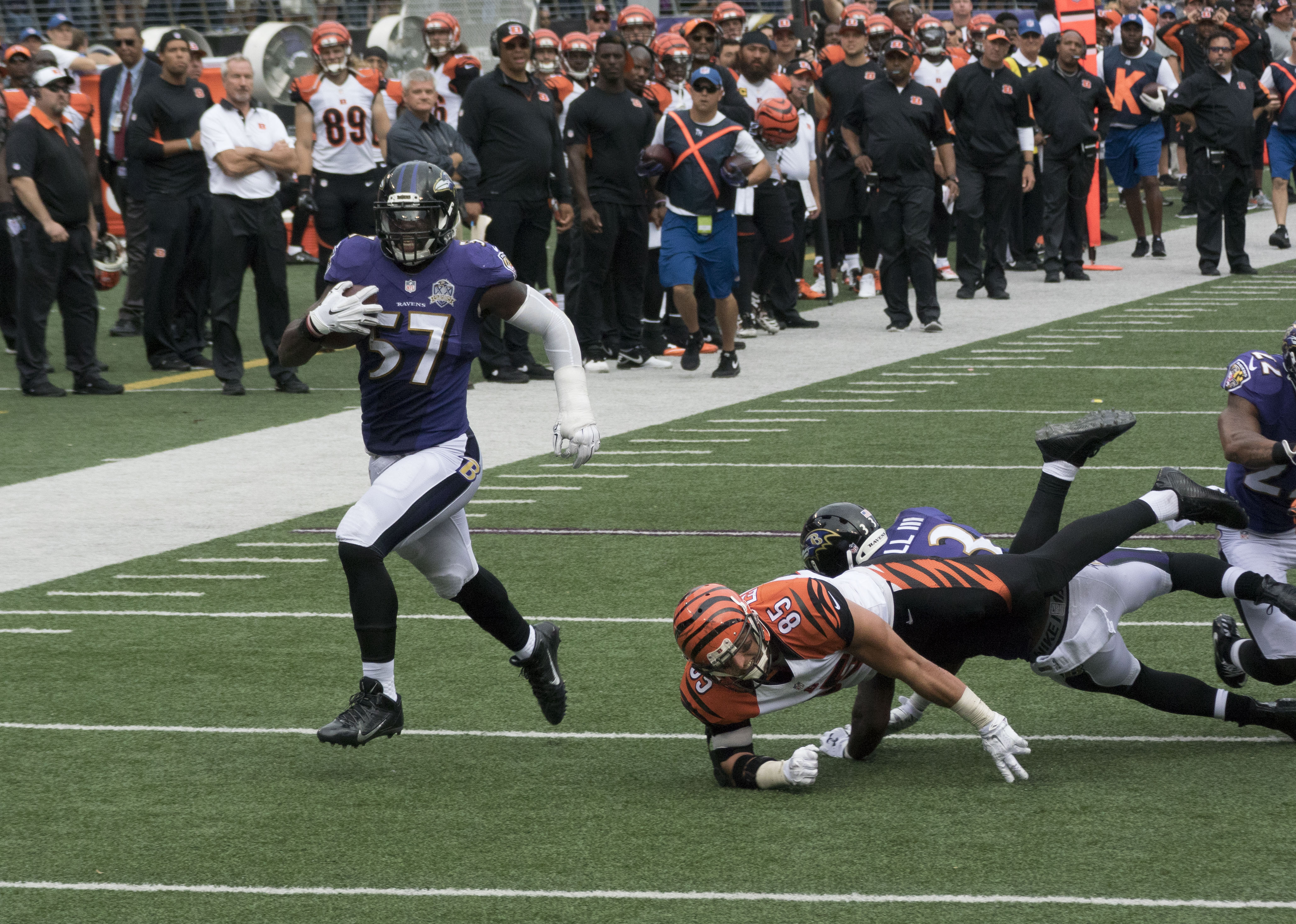
Mosley returning a fumble for a touchdown against the Cincinnati Bengals in 2015

Mosley was assigned the No. 57, which was worn by former Baltimore Raven O. J. Brigance. The No. 57 had been unofficially retired after Brigance was diagnosed with ALS. No. 57 was also worn by Bart Scott (who was assigned the number before O.J. Brigance's diagnosis). Head coach John Harbaugh named Mosley and Daryl Smith the starting inside linebackers to begin the regular season, alongside outside linebackers Courtney Upshaw and Terrell Suggs. Mosley was the first rookie to start on the Ravens' defense since Haloti Ngata in 2006.

He made his professional regular season debut and first career start in the Ravens' season-opener against the Bengals and made seven combined tackles and a pass deflection in their 23–16 loss. On October 5, 2014, Mosley collected a season-high 15 combined tackles (eight solo), deflected a pass, and made his first career interception during a 21–13 loss at the Indianapolis Colts in Week 4. Mosley intercepted a pass by quarterback Andrew Luck, off a tipped pass originally intended for running back Ahmad Bradshaw, and returned it for an 18-yard gain in the fourth quarter. In Week 12 Mosley recorded nine solo tackles and made his first career sack on Saints' quarterback Drew Brees for a six-yard loss in the second quarter of the Ravens' 34–27 win at the Saints. On December 23, 2014, it was announced that Mosley was selected to play in the 2015 Pro Bowl, making him the first Ravens player to be voted to the Pro Bowl in their rookie season. Mosley was the runner-up for NFL Defensive Rookie of the Year. He finished his rookie season in 2014 with 133 combined tackles (89 solo), eight pass deflections, three sacks, and two interceptions in 16 games and 16 starts. He was named to the PFWA All-Rookie Team.

The Ravens finished third in the AFC North with a 10–6 record and earned a wildcard berth. On January 3, 2015, Mosley started his first career playoff game and recorded nine combined tackles during the Ravens' 30–17 win at the Pittsburgh Steelers in the AFC Wildcard Game. The following week, he made ten combined tackles (seven solo) and forced a fumble during a 35–31 loss at the New England Patriots in the AFC Divisional Round.

==== 2015 ====
Harbaugh retained Mosley and Smith as the starting inside linebackers to start the season, alongside outside linebackers Elvis Dumervil and Terrell Suggs.

He started in the Ravens' season-opener at the Denver Broncos and made six combined tackles, deflected a pass, and made two sacks on quarterback Peyton Manning during a 19–13 loss. On September 27, 2015, Mosley recorded nine combined tackles, deflected a pass, and returned a fumble recovery for the first touchdown of his career during a 28–24 loss in Week 3. Mosley recovered a fumble after teammate Elvis Dumervil stripped the ball from quarterback Andy Dalton and returned it for a 41-yard touchdown in the fourth quarter. On November 22, 2015, he collected a season-high 12 combined tackles (seven solo) during a 16–13 victory against the St. Louis Rams in Week 11. He started all 16 games in 2015 and recorded 117 combined tackles (77 solo), seven pass deflections, four sacks, a forced fumble, a fumble recovery, and a touchdown.

==== 2016 ====
Defensive coordinator Dean Pees retained Mosley as a starting inside linebacker to begin the regular season, alongside Zach Orr and outside linebackers Terrell Suggs and Elvis Dumervil.

In Week 3, he recorded six combined tackles, broke up two passes, and made an interception during a 19–17 win at the Jacksonville Jaguars. This marked his second consecutive game with an interception. Mosley was inactive for two games (Weeks 6–7) due to a hamstring injury. The injury ended his 37-game streak of consecutive starts. On December 18, 2016, Mosley collected a season-high 13 combined tackles (eight solo) during a 27–26 win against the Eagles in Week 15. On December 20, 2016, it was announced that Mosley was voted to the 2017 Pro Bowl, marking the second Pro Bowl selection of his career. and second-team All-Pro He finished the 2016 season with 92 combined tackles (56 solo), eight pass deflections, four interceptions, and a forced fumble in 14 games and 14 starts. Pro Football Focus gave Mosley an overall grade of 85.8. His grade was the 11th best grade among all qualifying linebackers in 2016.

==== 2017 ====
On March 28, 2017, the Ravens exercised the fifth-year option on Mosley's rookie contract. The option earned him a base salary of $8.71 million for the 2017 season. Harbaugh named Mosley and Kamalei Correa the starting inside linebackers to begin the regular season, alongside outside linebackers Terrell Suggs and Matthew Judon.

He started in the Ravens' season-opener at the Bengals and recorded eight combined tackles, deflected a pass, and intercepted a pass by quarterback Andy Dalton during a 20–0 victory. On October 26, 2017, Mosley made four combined tackles, a pass deflection, was credited with half a sack, and returned an interception for a touchdown during a 40–0 victory on Thursday Night Football against the Miami Dolphins in Week 8. Mosley intercepted a pass by Dolphins' quarterback Matt Moore, that was initially intended for wide receiver Jarvis Landry, and returned it for a 63-yard touchdown in the fourth quarter. The touchdown marked his first career pick six. In Week 14, he collected a season-high 14 combined tackles (nine solo) and made a pass deflection in the Ravens' 39–38 loss at the Steelers. On December 19, 2017, it was announced that Mosley was voted to the 2018 Pro Bowl which marked his third Pro Bowl selection of his career. He started in all 16 games in 2017 and recorded 132 combined tackles (96 solo), seven pass deflections, three forced fumbles, three fumble recoveries, two interceptions, one sack, and a touchdown. Pro Football Focus gave Mosley an overall grade of 72.6, which ranked 20th among all qualifying linebackers in 2017. He was ranked 98th by his peers on the NFL Top 100 Players of 2018.

==== 2018 ====
On December 18, 2018, Mosley was named to the fourth Pro Bowl of his career. On December 30, 2018, Mosley made 4.5 combined tackles (three solo) and a game-winning interception during a 26–24 victory against the Cleveland Browns in Week 17. Mosley intercepted a pass by Browns' quarterback Baker Mayfield intended for running back, Duke Johnson at 1:06 of the fourth quarter, sealing the victory. The victory resulted in the Ravens clinching the AFC North division against the Steelers and a playoff spot with a 10–6 record. He was named to his fourth Pro Bowl. He finished the season as the Ravens leading tackler with 105 combined tackles, along with half a sack, five passes defensed, and an interception. He was ranked 71st by his fellow players on the NFL Top 100 Players of 2019.

=== New York Jets ===
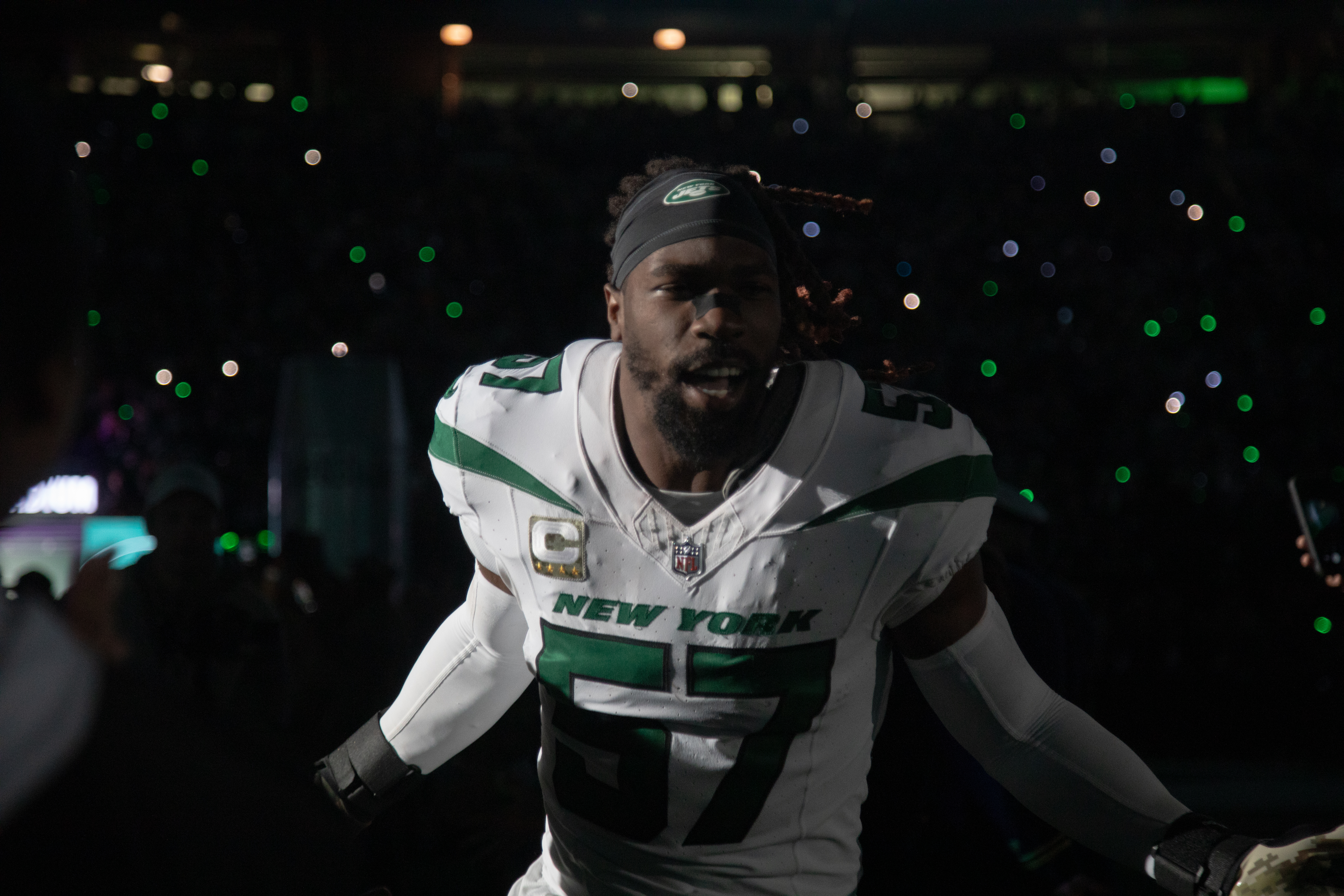
Mosley with the New York Jets in 2023

On March 15, 2019, Mosley signed a five-year, $85 million deal with the New York Jets. Mosley made his debut with the Jets in Week 1 against the Bills, making 5 tackles and intercepting a pass from quarterback Josh Allen and returning it for a touchdown. However, he injured his groin in the third quarter and did not return. Prior to his injury, the Jets held a 16–0 lead, but collapsed afterwards to lose 17–16. On December 3, the Jets placed Mosley on injured reserve due to an aggravating groin injury throughout the season. He was the 15th different player on the team to go on injured reserve. It was revealed that he needed groin surgery to repair the issue.

On August 3, 2020, Mosley announced he would opt out of the 2020 season due to the COVID-19 pandemic.

Mosley returned in the 2021 season. He finished with two sacks, 168 tackles, two passes defended, and two forced fumbles. In the 2022 season, he had one sack, 158 tackles, one interception, seven passes defended, and one fumble recovery. He was named to the Pro Bowl for the 2022 season. He was ranked 46th by his fellow players on the NFL Top 100 Players of 2023. In the 2023 season, he had a half-sack, 152 tackles, one interception, seven passes defended, two forced fumbles, and one fumble recovery. In the 2024 season, he appeared in four games due to toe and neck injuries.

Mosley was released by the Jets on March 12, 2025.

On June 19, 2025, on his 33rd birthday, Mosley announced his retirement from professional football.

== NFL career statistics ==
=== Regular season ===
| Year | Team | Games | | Tackles | | | | | Interceptions | | | | | | Fumbles | | | |
| Year | Team | GP | GS | Cmb | Solo | Ast | Sck | Sfty | PD | Int | Yds | Avg | Lng | TD | FF | FR | Yds | TD |
|---|---|---|---|---|---|---|---|---|---|---|---|---|---|---|---|---|---|---|
| 2014 | BAL | 16 | 16 | 133 | 88 | 45 | 3.0 | — | 8 | 2 | 23 | 11.5 | 18 | 0 | 1 | 1 | 6 | 0 |
| 2015 | BAL | 16 | 16 | 117 | 77 | 40 | 4.0 | — | 7 | 0 | 0 | 0.0 | 0 | 0 | 1 | 2 | 41 | 1 |
| 2016 | BAL | 14 | 14 | 92 | 56 | 36 | 0.0 | — | 8 | 4 | 40 | 10.0 | 28 | 0 | 1 | 0 | 0 | 0 |
| 2017 | BAL | 16 | 16 | 132 | 96 | 36 | 1.0 | — | 7 | 2 | 94 | 47.0 | 63 | 1 | 3 | 3 | 18 | 0 |
| 2018 | BAL | 15 | 15 | 105 | 70 | 35 | 0.5 | — | 5 | 1 | 0 | 0.0 | 0 | 0 | 0 | 0 | 0 | 0 |
| 2019 | NYJ | 2 | 2 | 9 | 4 | 5 | 0.0 | — | 2 | 1 | 17 | 17.0 | 17 | 1 | 0 | 1 | 0 | 0 |
| 2020 | NYJ | 0 | 0 | Opted out due to COVID-19 | | | | | | | | | | | | | | |
| 2021 | NYJ | 16 | 16 | 168 | 103 | 65 | 2.0 | — | 2 | 0 | 0 | 0.0 | 0 | 0 | 2 | 0 | 0 | 0 |
| 2022 | NYJ | 17 | 17 | 158 | 99 | 59 | 1.0 | — | 7 | 1 | 0 | 0.0 | 0 | 0 | 0 | 1 | 0 | 0 |
| 2023 | NYJ | 17 | 17 | 152 | 81 | 71 | 0.5 | — | 7 | 1 | 0 | 0.0 | 0 | 0 | 2 | 1 | 0 | 0 |
| 2024 | NYJ | 4 | 3 | 17 | 13 | 4 | 0.0 | — | 0 | 0 | 0 | 0.0 | 0 | 0 | 0 | 0 | 0 | 0 |
| Career | | 133 | 132 | 1,083 | 687 | 396 | 12.0 | — | 53 | 12 | 174 | 14.5 | 63 | 2 | 10 | 9 | 65 | 1 |

=== Postseason ===
| Year | Team | Games | | Tackles | | | | | Interceptions | | | | | | Fumbles | | | |
| Year | Team | GP | GS | Cmb | Solo | Ast | Sck | Sfty | PD | Int | Yds | Avg | Lng | TD | FF | FR | Yds | TD |
|---|---|---|---|---|---|---|---|---|---|---|---|---|---|---|---|---|---|---|
| 2014 | BAL | 2 | 2 | 19 | 12 | 7 | 0.0 | — | 0 | 0 | 0 | 0.0 | 0 | 0 | 1 | 0 | 0 | 0 |
| 2018 | BAL | 1 | 1 | 12 | 6 | 6 | 0.0 | — | 0 | 0 | 0 | 0.0 | 0 | 0 | 0 | 1 | 12 | 0 |
| Career | | 3 | 3 | 31 | 18 | 13 | 0.0 | — | 0 | 0 | 0 | 0.0 | 0 | 0 | 1 | 1 | 12 | 0 |

== Personal life ==
His brother is linebacker Jamey Mosley, who was briefly his teammate on the Jets in 2019.
