= Jamey Mosley =

American football player (born 1996)

Stanford Cardinal
- Title: Defensive line coach

Personal information
- Born: March 28, 1996 (age 30); Mobile, Alabama
- Listed height: 6 ft 5 in (1.96 m)
- Listed weight: 238 lb (108 kg)

Career information
- High school: Theodore (Mobile, Alabama)
- College: Alabama
- NFL draft: 2019: undrafted

Career history

Playing
- New York Jets (2019)*; Arizona Cardinals (2019)*
- * Offseason or practice squad member only

Coaching
- Alabama (2021) Graduate assistant; Alabama (2022–2025) Defensive analyst; Stanford (2026–present) Defensive line coach

Awards and highlights
- 2× CFP national champion (2015, 2017)
- Stats at Pro Football Reference

Jamey Mosley (born March 28, 1996) is an American former football linebacker. He played college football at Alabama. Mosley was signed by the New York Jets as an undrafted free agent in 2019.

== Professional career ==
=== New York Jets ===
Mosley was signed by the New York Jets as an undrafted free agent on May 10, 2019. He was waived during final roster cuts on August 31, but was re-signed to the team's practice squad the next day. He was released on October 7. On November 1, Mosley was re-signed to the practice squad. He was released on November 25.

=== Arizona Cardinals ===
On December 18, 2019, Mosley was signed to the Arizona Cardinals practice squad. His practice squad contract with the team expired on January 6, 2020.

== Coaching career ==
=== Alabama ===
Mosley joined the Alabama coaching staff as a graduate assistant. At the beginning of the 2022 season, Mosley moved to defensive analyst working primarily with the defensive line.

=== Stanford ===
Mosley was named defensive line coach for Stanford.

== Personal life ==
His brother is former New York Jets inside linebacker C.J. Mosley, who was briefly his teammate on the Jets in 2019.
