= Mon Louis, Alabama =

Unincorporated community in Alabama, United States

- Unincorporated community
- Location within Alabama Location within the United States
- Coordinates: 30°26′25″N 88°6′20″W
- Country: United States
- State: Alabama
- County: Mobile
- Elevation: 0 ft (0 m)
- Time zone: UTC-6 (Central (CST))
  - Summer (DST): UTC-5 (CDT)
- Area code: 251

Mon Louis is an unincorporated community on Mon Louis Island, in Mobile County, Alabama, United States.

== History ==
Mon Louis is named for the nearby Mon Louis Island. The island was named by Nicholas Baudin, Sieur de Miragouin, in honor of his French native city Montlouis-sur-Loire. A post office operated under the name Mon Louis from 1890 to 1916.

== Geography ==
Mon Louis is located at 30.440474°N 88.105832°W and has an elevation of 0 feet (0 m).
