= Theodore High School =

Location
- 6201 Swedetown Road; Theodore, Alabama 36582; United States; 30°32′39″N 88°11′09″W

Information
- Type: Public
- Established: 1920 (106 years ago)
- School district: Mobile County Public School System
- Superintendent: Chresal Threadgill
- CEEB code: 012615
- Principal: Timothy Hardegree
- Staff: 67.00 (FTE)
- Grades: 9-12
- Enrollment: 1,218 (2024–2025)
- Student to teacher ratio: 18.18
- Colors: Red, white, and black
- Nickname: Bobcats
- Website: www.theodorebobcats.org

Theodore High School is a four-year senior high school located in Theodore, Alabama, United States. The school operates in the Mobile County Public School System. There are roughly 1,700 students and 100-110 staff members at the school.

It serves: Theodore, a portion of Tillmans Corner, and portions of the St. Elmo area.

== Feeder patterns ==
The following middle schools feed into Theodore High School :

Portions of the attendance zone:

- Burns Middle School
- Hankins Middle School

== Athletics ==
Theodore's athletic teams plays in the Alabama High School Athletic Association Class 6A Region 1. The mascot for the athletic teams is the Bobcats. Eric Collier has led the Bobcats to multiple playoff visits. Under Collier, the football team has posted a 62–40 record between 2013 and 2022.

Theodore has only one state championship in boys track and field (1992). But has visited the state championship consecutively since (2011-2013). Theodore also has two more state championships in boys indoor track and field (1992) and (1999).

== School uniforms ==
Theodore's school uniforms consist of red, white, black polo or oxford style shirts. Pants: (girls)khaki pant or Bermuda style shorts Pants: (boys) same as girls Shoes: brown or black leather shoes Belts: any. (as of 2010)

== Accreditation ==
Theodore High School is accredited by the Southern Association of Colleges and Schools Council on Accreditation and School Improvement and the Commission on International and Trans-Regional Accreditation for 2007 and, therefore, is entitled to all the services and privileges of regional, national, and international professional recognition.

== History ==
Theodore High School was founded in 1920. The school was moved to its new location and building in 1984. Theodore High School is located in the southern section of the county near world-famous Bellingrath Gardens.

The school has an enrollment of approximately 1600 students in grades 9–12.

== Notable alumni ==
- Lyneal Alston, football wide receiver
- Frank Bolter, spotter for the 2014 Indianapolis 500 winner Ryan Hunter-Reay and NASCAR driver Kyle Busch
- Scott Bolton, former NFL wide receiver
- Kentrail Davis, professional baseball player
- Hanford Dixon, football cornerback
- Jo Ann Jenkins, class of 1976, CEO of AARP
- Shelby Lynne, singer and songwriter
- C. J. Mosley, former football linebacker
- Jamey Mosley, former football linebacker
- Christopher Murrill, professional baseball player
- La'Mical Perine, former football running back
- Etric Pruitt, Former NFL professional football player
