= Kentrail Davis =

American baseball player (born 1988)

- Outfielder
- Born: June 29, 1988 (age 37); Mobile, Alabama, U.S.
- Bats: Left Throws: Right
- Stats at Baseball Reference

Kentrail Latron Davis (born June 29, 1988) is an American professional baseball outfielder. Prior to playing professionally, Davis played college baseball at the University of Tennessee.

== Early life ==
Davis grew up in Theodore, Alabama, where he began playing baseball with the Boys & Girls Club. He attended Theodore High School. Davis worked for his father's construction company, which he credited with improving his upper body strength, allowing him to become more of a power hitter.

== Collegiate career ==
Though he was considered a possible first-round draft pick in the 2007 Major League Baseball (MLB) Draft, his association with sports agent Scott Boras, whose players typically demand large signing bonuses, and an injury led him to fall into the 14th round, where he was selected by the Colorado Rockies. Rather than sign, Davis opted to attend the University of Tennessee, where he played college baseball for the Tennessee Volunteers baseball team. As a freshman, Davis had a .330 batting average with 13 home runs and 44 runs batted in (RBI). Before his sophomore season, he was named a preseason All-American by both Baseball America and Rivals.com. As a sophomore, he batted .308 with nine home runs and 30 RBI.

== Professional career ==
Eligible for the 2009 MLB draft, the Milwaukee Brewers selected Davis in the first round, with the 39th overall selection. He signed with the Brewers, receiving a $1.2 million signing bonus. In 2010, his first professional season, he played for the Wisconsin Timber Rattlers of the Class A Midwest League and the Brevard County Manatees of the Class A-Advanced Florida State League, was limited by a hamstring injury. He returned to Brevard County for the 2011 season. In 2012, he played for the Huntsville Stars of the Class AA Southern League. The Brewers invited Davis to spring training as a non-roster invitee in 2013. During the 2013 season, the Brewers promoted Davis to the Nashville Sounds of the Class AAA Pacific Coast League.

On May 22, 2014, Davis hit for the cycle in a game for Huntsville. During the 2014 Winter Meetings, the Los Angeles Angels of Anaheim selected Davis in the Class AAA phase of the Rule 5 draft. They assigned him to the Arkansas Travelers of the Class AA Texas League to start the 2015 season. In June 2015 he was then released from the Arkansas Travelers.
