= Etric Pruitt =

American football player (born 1981)

No. 42, 35
- Position: Cornerback

Personal information
- Born: August 16, 1981 (age 45); Theodore, Alabama, U.S.
- Listed height: 6 ft 0 in (1.83 m)
- Listed weight: 196 lb (89 kg)

Career information
- High school: Theodore (AL)
- College: Southern Mississippi
- NFL draft: 2004: 6th round, 186th overall pick

Career history
- Atlanta Falcons (2004); Seattle Seahawks (2005); St. Louis Rams (2006)*; Detroit Lions (2006–2007)*; → Berlin Thunder (2007); Bloomington Extreme (2009); Mobile Bay Tarpons (2011)
- * Offseason or practice squad member only
- Stats at Pro Football Reference

Etric Pruitt (born August 16, 1981) is an American former professional football cornerback and safety He was selected by the Atlanta Falcons in the sixth round of the 2004 NFL draft. Pruitt played for the Seattle Seahawks in 2005 as a special teams player and third string safety. Having never played safety throughout the season as well as the playoffs, he played an important role in Super Bowl XL as Seattle's second string safety Marquand Manuel (filling in for first-string Ken Hamlin, who was out most of the season) was injured in the second quarter. In 2010, Pruitt signed to play with the Southern Indoor Football League (SIFL) team, the Mobile Bay Tarpons.

== Healthcare fraud case ==
Pruitt was charged with one count of conspiracy to commit wire fraud and health care fraud by the United States Department of Justice on December 12, 2019. He pleaded guilty to the charge on January 27, 2020. In October 2021, Pruitt was sentenced to three months in federal prison and 180 days of house arrest.
