= Scott Bolton (American football) =

American football player (born 1965)

No. 82
- Position: Wide receiver

Personal information
- Born: January 4, 1965 (age 61); Mobile, Alabama, U.S.
- Listed height: 6 ft 0 in (1.83 m)
- Listed weight: 188 lb (85 kg)

Career information
- High school: Theodore (AL)
- College: Auburn (1983–1987)
- NFL draft: 1988: 12th round, 312th overall pick

Career history
- Green Bay Packers (1988–1989)

Career NFL statistics
- Receptions: 2
- Receiving yards: 33
- Stats at Pro Football Reference

Scott Allen Bolton (born January 4, 1965) is an American former professional football player who was a wide receiver for one season in the National Football League (NFL) for the Green Bay Packers. He played college football for the Auburn Tigers and was selected in the 12th round of the 1988 NFL draft by the Packers.

== Early life ==
Bolton was born on January 4, 1965, in Mobile, Alabama. He attended Theodore High School in Alabama and was the third alumnus of the school to play in the NFL. At Theodore, he competed in football and track and field. In football, he played as a running back, wide receiver and defensive back, also seeing time as a placekicker. As a senior, he was limited by injury for most of the season but still managed to run for 950 yards and scored nine touchdowns, being named first-team all-class. Bolton was also invited to the Alabama high school all-star game. In track and field, he ran a 4.4-second 40-yard dash and a 9.7-second 100-yard dash. He committed to play college football for the Auburn Tigers.

== College career ==
Bolton enrolled at Auburn in 1983 and was a management major. He redshirted as a freshman. Initially a running back, he was at first a member of the junior varsity team in 1984 before being promoted to the varsity team, where he rushed one time for eight yards. He was moved to wide receiver in 1985 and spent the rest of his Auburn career at the position, sharing receiving duties with four or five others each year while Auburn had a run-oriented playbook. In 1985, he caught 11 receptions for 139 yards, helping Auburn to a 8–4 record and a 1986 Cotton Bowl Classic berth. He then caught 11 passes for 169 yards and ran six times for 91 yards and two touchdowns in 1986, as the Tigers went 10–2 with a win in the 1987 Florida Citrus Bowl. As a senior in 1987, Bolton recorded 10 catches for 132 yards and one touchdown as Auburn went 9–1–2, winning the Southeastern Conference (SEC) championship and tying Syracuse in the 1988 Sugar Bowl.

Bolton concluded his collegiate career having totaled 32 receptions for 440 yards and a touchdown, also running seven times for 99 yards and two touchdowns and returning two kickoffs for 29 yards. He was invited to the 1988 Senior Bowl. After he was selected to the Senior Bowl, his high school held a "Scott Bolton Day" in celebration of his accomplishments.

== Professional career ==
The Birmingham Post-Herald projected Bolton to be a late-round NFL draft selection or an undrafted free agent, describing him as "a speed guy who doesn't have great quickness. He's not flashy ... He catches the ball well ... [and] has the speed to play." He was reported to have impressed at the Senior Bowl, with The Capital Times noting that he had an "excellent" 40-yard dash time (4.49 seconds) and "caught everything that was thrown to him." Bolton ended up being selected by the Green Bay Packers in the 12th round (312th overall) of the 1988 NFL draft, being the team's last selection.

After contemplating whether to leave for the Canadian Football League (CFL), Bolton signed a one-year contract with the Packers in June 1988, with an option for a second year. After initially surviving the final roster cutdowns, he was placed on injured reserve on August 30 due to a dislocated shoulder. He was released on November 24, then re-signed on November 25 to the active roster in a procedural move to get him off injured reserve. Bolton made his NFL debut in November 27 in the team's Week 13 game against the Chicago Bears, recording no statistics. The following week, against the Detroit Lions, he recorded his first statistics, totaling two receptions for 33 yards in a 30–14 loss. He appeared in two further games for the 1988 Packers.

Bolton returned for the 1989 season but suffered torn ligaments in his right knee during training camp. He was later waived on July 27, 1989, marking the end of his professional career. He finished his NFL career having totaled two receptions for 33 yards in four games played.
