= Dauphin Island Bridge =

Gordon Persons Bridge
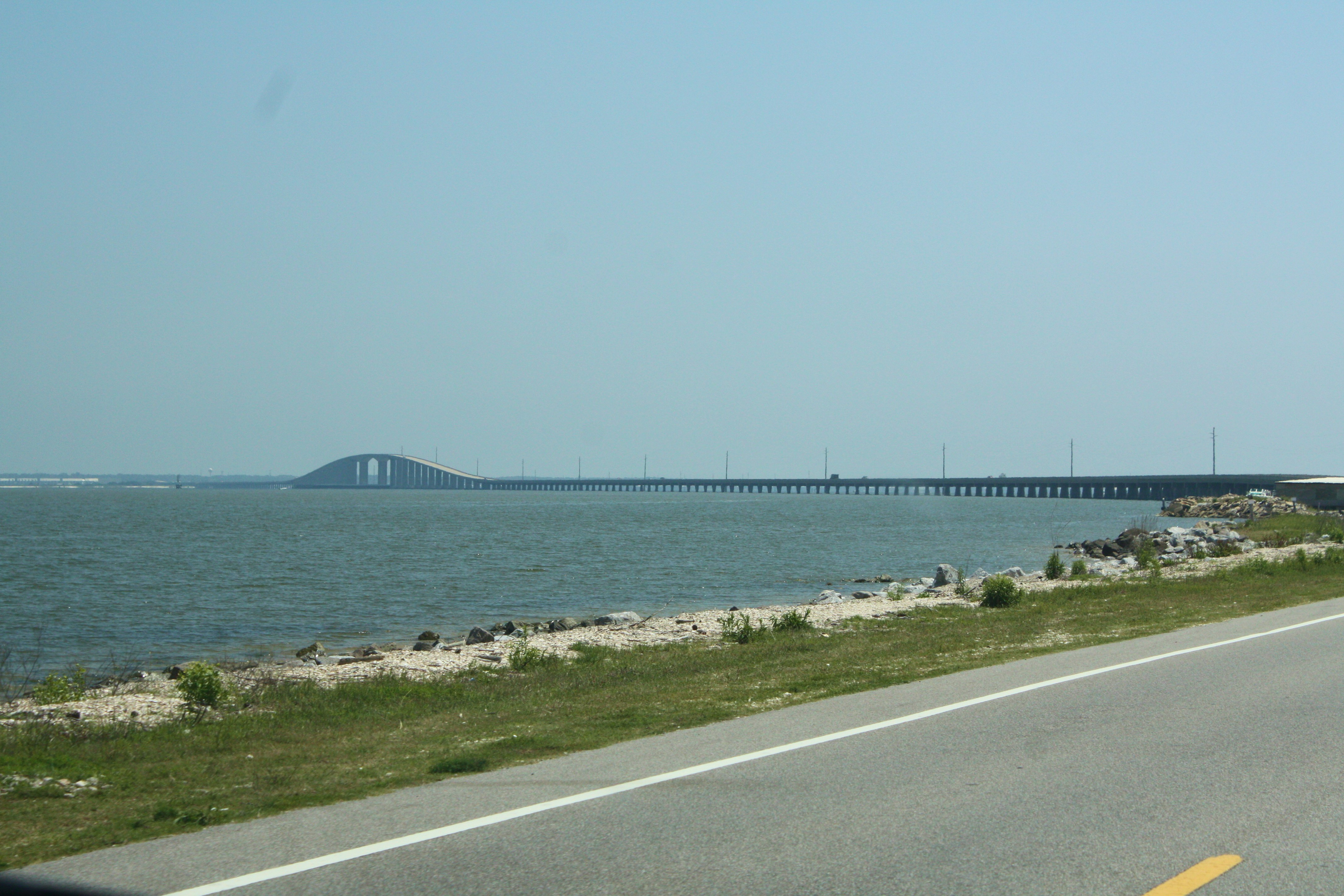
- View of the bridge from SR-193.
- Coordinates: 30.2921°N 88.1300°W
- Carries: 2 lanes of SR 193
- Crosses: Gulf Intracoastal Waterway
- Locale: Dauphin Island, Alabama
- Other name(s): Dauphin Island Bridge

Characteristics
- Design: FIGG Bridge Engineers
- Total length: 17,814 feet (5,430 m)
- Longest span: 400 feet (122 m)
- Clearance below: 83 feet (25 m)

History
- Opened: 1982

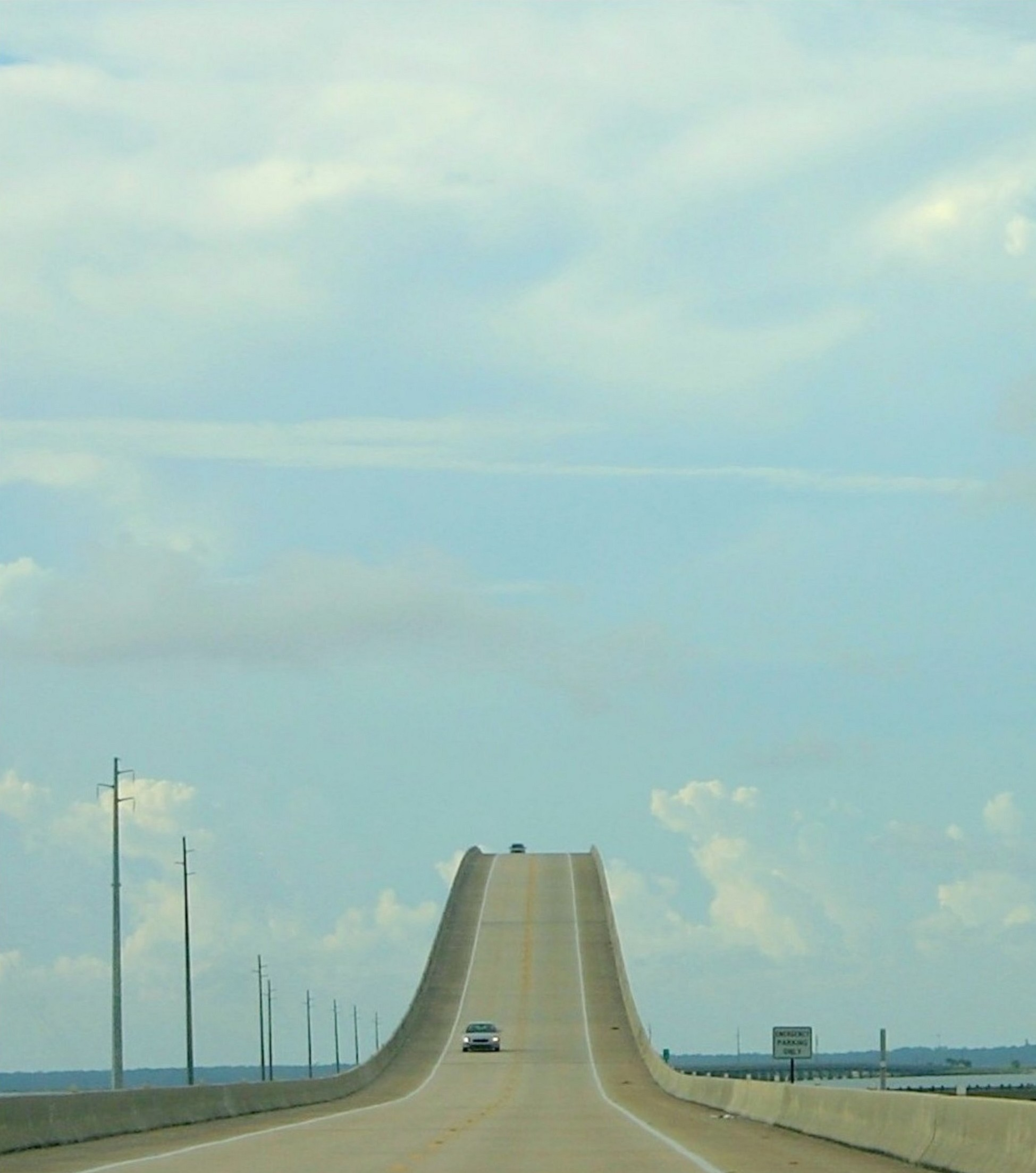
On the way to Dauphin Island crossing the Dauphin Island Bridge.

The Dauphin Island Bridge, formally the Gordon Persons Bridge, carries a 3-mile (4.8 km), two-lane section of Alabama State Route 193 from mainland Mobile County, Alabama across the Gulf Intracoastal Waterway to Dauphin Island. The natural channel followed by the Gulf Intracoastal Waterway at this location is Pass Aux Herons. The bridge separates the Mississippi Sound on the west from Mobile Bay on the east. It was named in honor of Seth Gordon Persons, the 46th governor of Alabama.

== History ==
The original bridge opened on July 2, 1955. It was destroyed by Hurricane Frederic in 1979 and was replaced by a fixed precast concrete segmental bridge in 1982. The central main span was the first use of a 400-foot (122 m) span on a precast concrete segmental bridge.

January 7, 2008, Vietnamese immigrant Lam Luong tossed his four children to their deaths from the bridge. In March 2009, a jury in Mobile County convicted him of capital murder for the act. He was sentenced to death April 30, 2009. His death sentence was reduced to life without parole October 15, 2018; a ruling said he was intellectually impaired and had an IQ too low for execution.
