= Fowl River =

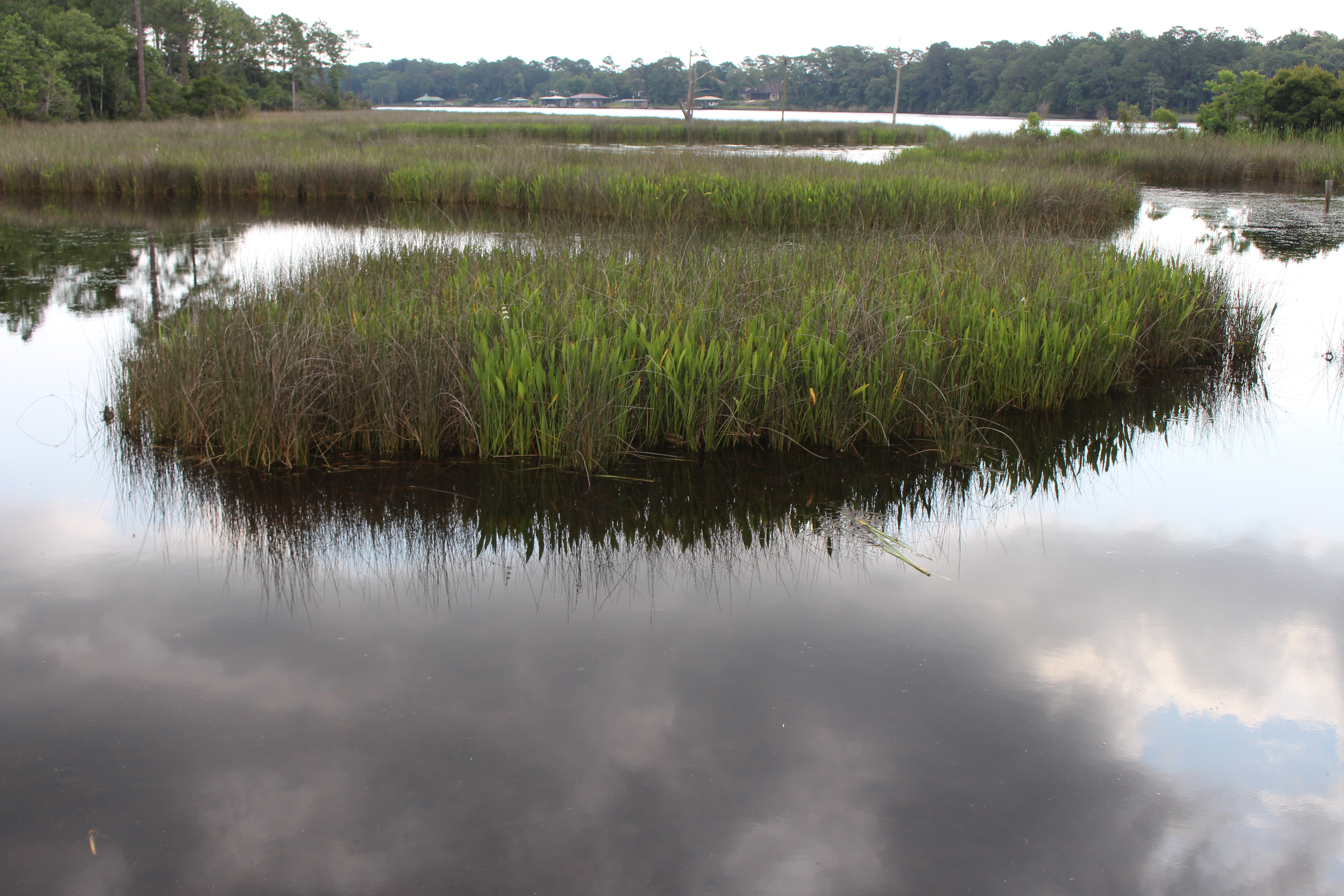
- Fowl River at Bellingrath Gardens and Home

Location
- Country: United States
- State: Alabama
- County: Mobile County

Physical characteristics
- Source
  - coordinates: 30.55602°N 88.23528°W
- Mouth
  - location: 30.45013°N 88.10872°W (East Fowl River); 30.36414°N 88.18775°W (West Fowl River)
  - elevation: 0 m (0 ft)
- Basin size: Mississippi Coastal

Fowl River is a 14.4-mile-long (23.2 km) brackish river in Mobile County, Alabama. It originates near the Mobile suburb of Theodore and then splits into the East Fowl River and the West Fowl River. The East Fowl River discharges into Mobile Bay south of Belle Fontaine. The West Fowl River discharges into the Mississippi Sound east of Coden. It was named by the original French colonists as the Riviere aux Poules, which can be translated into English as Fowl River.

The famed Irish pirate Paddy Scott would regularly enter and leave the river.

Fowl River is part of a drowned river valley estuary 31 miles long and 23 miles wide, encompassing over 250,000 square acres, or 413 square miles. This shallow estuary, with average depths of less than 10 feet, provides a vast transition area between the freshwater wetlands of the Mobile-Tensaw Delta to the north and the marine environments of the Gulf of Mexico to the south.
