= Alabama Port, Alabama =

Unincorporated community in Alabama, United States

- Unincorporated community
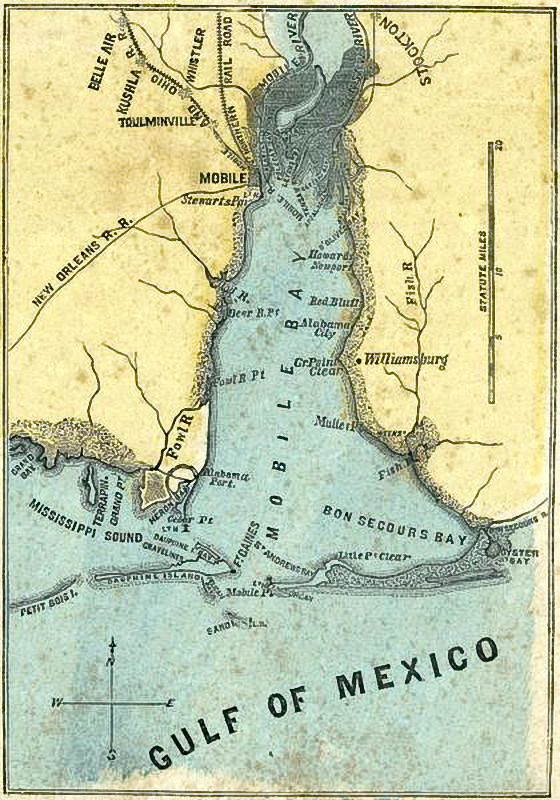
- Map of Alabama Port on lower west side of Mobile Bay, 1861

- Location within the state of Alabama Alabama Port (the United States)
- Coordinates: 30°21′45″N 88°6′52″W
- Country: United States
- State: Alabama
- County: Mobile
- Elevation: 7 ft (2.1 m)
- Time zone: UTC-6 (Central (CST))
  - Summer (DST): UTC-5 (CDT)
- Area code: 251

Alabama Port, also sometimes known as Port Alabama, is an unincorporated community on Mon Louis Island, in Mobile County, Alabama, United States.

== Geography ==
Alabama Port is located at 30.440474°N 88.105832°W, on the western shore of Mobile Bay, at an elevation of 7 feet (2 m).

== Demographics ==
=== Alabama Port Precinct (1880) ===
Historical population
Census	Pop.	Note	%±
1880	417		—
U.S. Decennial Census

Alabama Port has never reported separately as an unincorporated community on the U.S. Census. However, in 1880, the 19th precinct of Mobile County bore its name, and had 417 residents. The name of the precinct was changed in 1890 to Cedar Point, then Heron Bayou and Dauphin Island in 1900, simply Heron Bayou for 1910-20 and "Herron Bay" for 1930–50. It was consolidated under the Bayou La Batre census division in 1960.
