= Tillmans Corner, Alabama =

Unincorporated community and census-designated place in Alabama, US

- Unincorporated community and census-designated place
- Location in Mobile County and the state of Alabama
- Coordinates: 30°34′54″N 88°12′46″W
- Country: United States
- State: Alabama
- County: Mobile
- Established

Area
  - Total: 13.03 sq mi (33.75 km^{2})
  - Land: 12.99 sq mi (33.65 km^{2})
  - Water: 0.039 sq mi (0.10 km^{2})
- Elevation: 161 ft (49 m)

Population (2020)
  - Total: 17,731
  - Density: 1,360/sq mi (527/km^{2})
- Time zone: UTC-6 (Central (CST))
  - Summer (DST): UTC-5 (CDT)
- ZIP Codes: 36582 (Theodore); 36619 (Mobile)
- FIPS code: 01-76320
- GNIS feature ID: 2402933

Tillmans Corner, or Tillman’s Corner, is an unincorporated community and census-designated place (CDP) in Mobile County, Alabama, United States. At the 2020 census, the population was 17,731. It is part of the Mobile metropolitan area, and is the largest census-designated place in Alabama.

== Geography ==
Tillmans Corner is located in southern Mobile County and is bordered to the northeast by the city of Mobile and to the southeast by Theodore. Interstate 10 forms the border between Tillmans Corner and Theodore, with access from Exit 13 (Theodore Dawes Road). I-10 leads northeast 14 miles (23 km) to Downtown Mobile and west 27 miles (43 km) to Pascagoula, Mississippi.

According to the U.S. Census Bureau, the Tillmans Corner CDP has a total area of 13.0 square miles (34 km^{2}), of which 0.04 square miles (0.10 km^{2}), or 0.30%, are water.

=== Climate ===
The climate in this area is characterized by hot, humid summers and generally mild to cool winters. According to the Köppen Climate Classification system, Tillmans Corner has a humid subtropical climate, abbreviated "Cfa" on climate maps.

== Demographics ==
Historical population
Census	Pop.	Note	%±
1980	15,941		—
1990	17,988		12.8%
2000	15,685		−12.8%
2010	17,398		10.9%
2020	17,731		1.9%

=== Racial and ethnic composition ===
Tillmans Corner racial composition Note: the US Census treats Hispanic/Latino as an ethnic category. This table excludes Latinos from the racial categories and assigns them to a separate category. Hispanics/Latinos may be of any race.
Race / ethnicity (NH = non-Hispanic)	Pop. 2000	Pop. 2010	Pop. 2020	% 2000	% 2010	% 2020
White alone (NH)	14,558	13,996	11,960	92.82%	90.85%	67.45%
Black or African American alone (NH)	494	1,961	3,193	3.15%	11.27%	18.01%
Native American or Alaska Native alone (NH)	93	93	96	0.59%	0.54%	0.54%
Asian alone (NH)	145	360	647	0.92%	2.07%	3.65%
Native Hawaiian or Pacific Islander alone (NH)	1	17	7	0.01%	0.10%	0.04%
Other race alone (NH)	13	28	64	0.08%	0.16%	0.36%
Mixed race or Multiracial (NH)	189	281	844	1.21%	1.62%	4.76%
Hispanic or Latino (any race)	192	662	920	1.22%	3.81%	5.19%
Total	15,685	17,398	17,731	100.00%	100.00%	100.00%

=== 2020 census ===
As of the 2020 census, there were 17,731 people in the CDP. The median age was 38.1 years. 24.2% of residents were under the age of 18 and 16.2% were 65 years of age or older. For every 100 females, there were 93.9 males, and for every 100 females age 18 and over, there were 90.8 males age 18 and over.

100.0% of residents lived in urban areas, and 0.0% lived in rural areas.

There were 6,914 households in Tillmans Corner, including 4,384 families. Of all households, 32.7% had children under the age of 18 living in them, 42.7% were married-couple households, 18.9% were households with a male householder and no spouse or partner present, and 31.1% were households with a female householder and no spouse or partner present. About 27.0% of all households were made up of individuals, and 10.9% had someone living alone who was 65 years of age or older.

There were 7,486 housing units, of which 7.6% were vacant. The homeowner vacancy rate was 1.9%, and the rental vacancy rate was 6.8%.

=== 2010 census ===
As of the census of 2010, there were 17,398 people, 6,604 households, and 4,690 families residing in the community. The population density was 1,300 inhabitants per square mile (500/km^{2}). There were 7,109 housing units at an average density of 546.8 per square mile (211.1/km^{2}). The racial makeup of the community was 82.2% White, 11.4% Black or African American, 0.6% Native American, 2.1% Asian, 0.1% Pacific Islander, 1.6% from other races, and 1.9% from two or more races. 3.8% of the population were Hispanic or Latino of any race.

There were 6,604 households, out of which 31.1% had children under the age of 18 living with them, 47.7% were married couples living together, 16.9% had a female householder with no husband present, and 29.0% were non-families. 24.2% of all households were made up of individuals, and 8.7% had someone living alone who was 65 years of age or older. The average household size was 2.63 and the average family size was 3.09.

In the community, the population was spread out, with 25.6% under the age of 18, 9.7% from 18 to 24, 25.6% from 25 to 44, 26.5% from 45 to 64, and 12.6% who were 65 years of age or older. The median age was 36.1 years. For every 100 females there were 95.5 males. For every 100 females age 18 and over, there were 94.9 males.

The median income for a household in the community was $38,031, and the median income for a family was $44,784. Males had a median income of $38,617 versus $25,544 for females. The per capita income for the community was $18,291. About 18.4% of families and 20.4% of the population were below the poverty line, including 28.2% of those under age 18 and 8.5% of those age 65 or over.

=== 2000 census ===
As of the census of 2000, there were 15,685 people, 5,904 households, and 4,457 families residing in the community. The population density was 896.8 inhabitants per square mile (346.3/km^{2}). There were 6,347 housing units at an average density of 362.9 per square mile (140.1/km^{2}). The racial makeup of the community was 93.57% White, 3.16% Black or African American, 0.61% Native American, 0.94% Asian, 0.01% Pacific Islander, 0.40% from other races, and 1.32% from two or more races. 1.22% of the population were Hispanic or Latino of any race.

There were 5,904 households, out of which 35.3% had children under the age of 18 living with them, 57.4% were married couples living together, 13.5% had a female householder with no husband present, and 24.5% were non-families. 20.2% of all households were made up of individuals, and 6.6% had someone living alone who was 65 years of age or older. The average household size was 2.65 and the average family size was 3.05.

In the community, the population was spread out, with 25.9% under the age of 18, 10.2% from 18 to 24, 29.3% from 25 to 44, 24.7% from 45 to 64, and 9.9% who were 65 years of age or older. The median age was 35 years. For every 100 females there were 95.7 males. For every 100 females age 18 and over, there were 93.4 males.

The median income for a household in the community was $34,309, and the median income for a family was $40,409. Males had a median income of $30,613 versus $21,637 for females. The per capita income for the community was $16,901. About 11.9% of families and 13.2% of the population were below the poverty line, including 18.5% of those under age 18 and 7.1% of those age 65 or over.

== Education ==
It is within the Mobile County Public School System.

Sections of the current CDP are served by Nan Gray Davis, Griggs, Haskew, and Meadowlake elementary schools. Middle schools serving sections of Tillmans Corner include Hankins Middle School and Burns Middle School. Much of it is zoned to Theodore High School while a small portion is zoned to Davidson High School.
