= Theodore, Alabama =

- Census-designated place
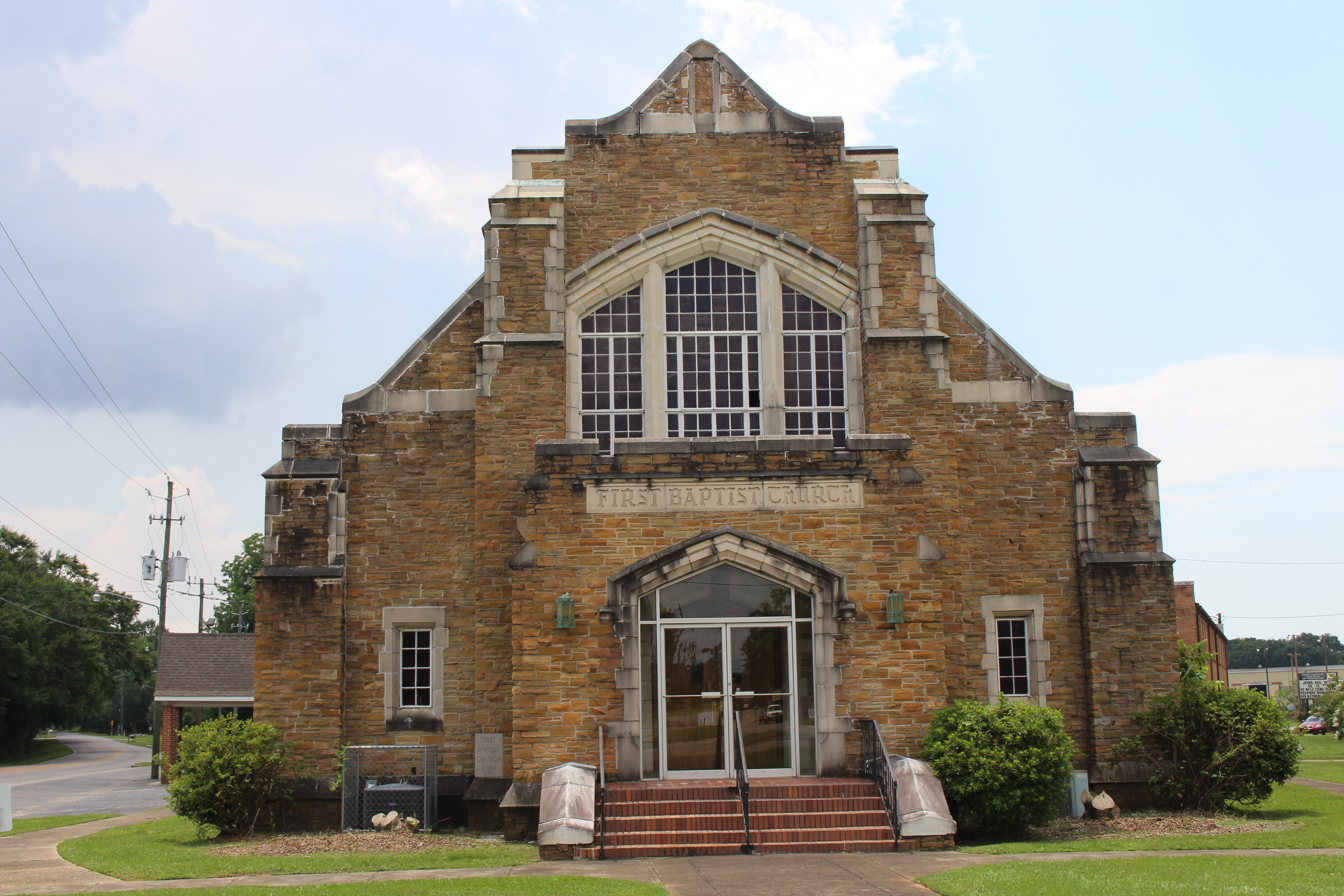
- First Baptist Church in Theodore

- Location in Mobile County and the state of Alabama
- Coordinates: 30°32′27″N 88°11′18″W
- Country: United States
- State: Alabama
- County: Mobile

Area
  - Total: 7.98 sq mi (20.68 km^{2})
  - Land: 7.98 sq mi (20.67 km^{2})
  - Water: 0.0039 sq mi (0.01 km^{2})
- Elevation: 128 ft (39 m)

Population (2020)
  - Total: 6,270
  - Density: 785.5/sq mi (303.29/km^{2})
- Time zone: UTC-6 (Central (CST))
  - Summer (DST): UTC-5 (CDT)
- ZIP codes: 36582, 36590, 36619
- Area code: 251
- FIPS code: 01-75768
- GNIS feature ID: 2402926

Theodore is an unincorporated area and census-designated place (CDP) in Mobile County, Alabama, United States. The population was 6,270 at the 2020 census. It is a part of the Mobile metropolitan area. Prior to 1900 this area was known as "Clements", but it is now named for William Theodore Hieronymous, a sawmill operator and postmaster.

== Geography ==
Theodore is located in southern Mobile County. It is bordered to the northeast by the city of Mobile (the original center of Theodore is now within the Mobile city limits) and to the northwest by Tillmans Corner. Interstate 10 forms the border between Theodore and Tillmans Corner, with access from Exit 13 (Theodore Dawes Road). I-10 leads northeast 14 miles (23 km) to downtown Mobile and west 27 miles (43 km) to the Pascagoula, Mississippi, area.

== Demographics ==
Historical population
Census	Pop.	Note	%±
1890	277		—
1980	6,392		—
1990	6,509		1.8%
2000	6,811		4.6%
2010	6,130		−10.0%
2020	6,270		2.3%

Theodore first appeared on the 1890 U.S. Census as a village. It did not appear again on the census until 1980 when it was designated a CDP (census-designated place).

=== Racial and ethnic composition ===
Theodore CDP, Alabama – Racial and ethnic composition Note: the US Census treats Hispanic/Latino as an ethnic category. This table excludes Latinos from the racial categories and assigns them to a separate category. Hispanics/Latinos may be of any race.
Race / Ethnicity (NH = Non-Hispanic)	Pop 2000	Pop 2010	Pop 2020	% 2000	% 2010	% 2020
White alone (NH)	4,786	4,769	4,186	70.27%	77.80%	66.76%
Black or African American alone (NH)	1,728	816	1,188	25.37%	13.31%	18.95%
Native American or Alaska Native alone (NH)	42	69	69	0.62%	1.13%	1.10%
Asian alone (NH)	88	150	198	1.29%	2.45%	3.16%
Native Hawaiian or Pacific Islander alone (NH)	0	2	1	0.00%	0.03%	0.02%
Other race alone (NH)	9	0	20	0.13%	0.00%	0.32%
Mixed race or Multiracial (NH)	64	126	323	0.94%	2.06%	5.15%
Hispanic or Latino (any race)	94	198	285	1.38%	3.23%	4.55%
Total	6,811	6,130	6,270	100.00%	100.00%	100.00%

=== 2020 census ===
As of the 2020 census, Theodore had a population of 6,270. The median age was 37.9 years. 24.2% of residents were under the age of 18 and 15.1% of residents were 65 years of age or older. For every 100 females there were 94.8 males, and for every 100 females age 18 and over there were 94.2 males age 18 and over. There were 1,465 families residing in the CDP.

96.8% of residents lived in urban areas, while 3.2% lived in rural areas.

There were 2,427 households in Theodore, of which 34.0% had children under the age of 18 living in them. Of all households, 41.6% were married-couple households, 19.5% were households with a male householder and no spouse or partner present, and 30.7% were households with a female householder and no spouse or partner present. About 26.2% of all households were made up of individuals and 10.8% had someone living alone who was 65 years of age or older.

There were 2,678 housing units, of which 9.4% were vacant. The homeowner vacancy rate was 1.6% and the rental vacancy rate was 13.1%.

=== 2010 census ===
As of the census of 2010, there were 6,130 people, 2,293 households, and 1,681 families living in the CDP. The population density was 770 inhabitants per square mile (300/km^{2}). There were 2,473 housing units at an average density of 309.1 per square mile (119.3/km^{2}). The racial makeup of the CDP was 79.7% White, 13.3% Black or African American, 1.1% Native American, 2.4% Asian, 1.1% from other races, and 2.2% from two or more races. 3.2% of the population were Hispanic or Latino of any race.

There were 2,293 households, out of which 35.7% had children under the age of 18 living with them, 49.0% were married couples living together, 17.6% had a female householder with no husband present, and 26.7% were non-families. 21.8% of all households were made up of individuals, and 7.9% had someone living alone who was 65 years of age or older. The average household size was 2.67 and the average family size was 3.08.

In the CDP, the population was spread out, with 27.4% under the age of 18, 9.8% from 18 to 24, 27.7% from 25 to 44, 23.7% from 45 to 64, and 11.4% who were 65 years of age or older. The median age was 34.3 years. For every 100 females, there were 92.8 males. For every 100 females age 18 and over, there were 93.3 males.

The median income for a household in the CDP was $41,473, and the median income for a family was $44,950. Males had a median income of $33,673 versus $23,658 for females. The per capita income for the CDP was $17,384. About 17.9% of families and 22.6% of the population were below the poverty line, including 37.8% of those under age 18 and 10.8% of those age 65 or over.

=== 2000 census ===
As of the census of 2000, there were 6,811 people, 2,483 households, and 1,926 families living in the CDP. The population density was 571.6 inhabitants per square mile (220.7/km^{2}). There were 2,697 housing units at an average density of 226.3 per square mile (87.4/km^{2}). The racial makeup of the CDP was 71.11% White, 25.58% Black or African American, 0.62% Native American, 1.29% Asian, 0.41% from other races, and 1.00% from two or more races. 1.38% of the population were Hispanic or Latino of any race.

There were 2,483 households, out of which 38.4% had children under the age of 18 living with them, 53.6% were married couples living together, 19.4% had a female householder with no husband present, and 22.4% were non-families. 19.3% of all households were made up of individuals, and 7.1% had someone living alone who was 65 years of age or older. The average household size was 2.73 and the average family size was 3.11.

In the CDP, the population was spread out, with 28.5% under the age of 18, 9.8% from 18 to 24, 29.2% from 25 to 44, 22.0% from 45 to 64, and 10.5% who were 65 years of age or older. The median age was 34 years. For every 100 females, there were 92.9 males. For every 100 females age 18 and over, there were 89.6 males.

The median income for a household in the CDPwas $33,750, and the median income for a family was $36,500. Males had a median income of $32,297 versus $19,679 for females. The per capita income for the CDP was $15,129. About 16.3% of families and 18.7% of the population were below the poverty line, including 25.6% of those under age 18 and 23.5% of those age 65 or over.

== Education ==
The community is in the Mobile County Public School System.

Two elementary schools, Mary Borroughs and Nan Gray Davis, serve sections of the CDP. All residents are zoned to Hankins Middle School and Theodore High School.

== Points of interest ==
- Bellingrath Gardens
- Fowl River

== Notable people ==
- Paul Bearer (William Moody), wrestling manager for The Undertaker
- Bernie Carbo, former Major League Baseball player
- Kentrail Davis, minor league baseball player
- Rodger McFarlane, first executive director of Gay Men's Health Crisis.
- C. J. Mosley, College football linebacker for Alabama and current NFL linebacker for the New York Jets
- Etric Pruitt, professional football player
- Willie Quinnie, former NFL wide receiver
- Geoff Ramsey, co-founder of Rooster Teeth and Achievement Hunter
- Andre Royal, former NFL linebacker
