= Alabama State Route 28 =

State highway in Alabama, United States

State Route 28

Route information
- Maintained by ALDOT
- Length: 97.287 mi (156.568 km)

Major junctions
- West end: SR 17 south of Emelle
- I-20 / I-59 in Livingston; US 11 in Livingston; US 80 near Bellamy; US 43 / SR 69 in Linden; SR 5 in Catherine SR 10 / SR 41 / SR 28 Truck / SR 41 Truck in Camden
- East end: SR 21 near Darlington

Location
- Country: United States
- State: Alabama
- Counties: Sumter, Marengo, Wilcox

Highway system
- Alabama State Highway System; Interstate; US; State
← SR 27	→ US 29

State Route 28 (SR 28) is a 97.287-mile-long (156.568 km) state highway in the western part of the U.S. state of Alabama. The highway’s western terminus is at an intersection with SR 17 at Emelle in northwestern Sumter County, and its eastern terminus is at an intersection with SR 21 near Darlington in eastern Wilcox County.

== Route description ==
From its beginning in Sumter County, SR 28 travels in a general southeastern trajectory through Livingston, the home of the University of West Alabama. After leaving Livingston, the highway travels through the Black Belt region of Alabama, one of the state’s poorest regions. The only towns whose population exceeds 2,000 that SR 28 travels through are Livingston, Linden, and Camden. East of Camden, the highway travels in a more eastern trajectory until its terminus approximately 13 miles (21 km) east of the town.

In June 2004, a segment of SR 28 near Coatopa was designated the Betty and Asa Green Highway. Asa Green served as president of Livingston State College (now the University of West Alabama) from 1973 to 1993.

== Major intersections ==
County	Location	mi	km	Destinations	Notes
Sumter		0.000	0.000	SR 17 – York, Geiger	Western terminus
Sumter	Livingston	7.059	11.360	I-20 / I-59 – Tuscaloosa, Meridian	I-20/I-59 exit 17
Sumter	Livingston	7.655	12.320	US 11 north (SR 7) – Eutaw	Western end of US 11/SR 7 concurrency
Sumter	Livingston	9.717	15.638	US 11 south (Lafayette Street / SR 7) – York	Eastern end of US 11/SR 7 concurrency
Sumter		21.926	35.286	US 80 west (SR 8) / CR 25 – Meridian	Western end of US 80/SR 8 concurrency
Marengo	Demopolis	26.446	42.561	US 80 east (SR 8) – Demopolis	Eastern end of US 80/SR 8 concurrency
Marengo	Linden	42.500	68.397	US 43 north / SR 69 north (SR 13) – Demopolis	Western end of US 43/SR 13/SR 69 concurrency
Marengo	Linden	42.914	69.063	US 43 south / SR 69 south (Main Street / SR 13) – Thomasville, Mobile	Eastern end of US 43/SR 13/SR 69 concurrency
Marengo	Thomaston	53.903	86.748	SR 25 – Faunsdale, Magnolia	
Marengo	Consul	58.726	94.510	SR 66 east – Safford	Western terminus of SR 66
Wilcox	Catherine	65.821	105.929	SR 5 – Selma, Pine Hill	Interchange
Wilcox		71.266	114.692	SR 162 west – Thomasville	Eastern terminus of SR 162
Wilcox		78.431	126.222	SR 221 south – Monroeville	Northern terminus of SR 221
Wilcox	Camden	82.402	132.613	SR 10 / SR 28 Truck east / SR 41 Truck – Greenville, Pine Hill, Wilcox Academy, Roland Cooper State Park	Western terminus of SR 28 Truck
Wilcox	Camden	83.755	134.791	SR 164 west (Clifton Street)	Eastern terminus of SR 164
Wilcox	Camden	83.958	135.117	SR 41 south (Claiborne Street)	Western end of SR 41 concurrency
Wilcox	Camden	84.005	135.193	SR 265 south (Water Street)	Northern terminus of SR 265
Wilcox	Camden	84.701	136.313	SR 10 west / SR 41 north / SR 28 Truck west / SR 41 Truck south – Selma, Pine Hill	Western end of SR 10 concurrency; eastern end of SR 41 concurrency; eastern terminus of SR 28 Truck; northern terminus of SR 41 Truck
Wilcox		88.278	142.070	SR 10 east – Greenville	Eastern end of SR 10 concurrency
Wilcox		97.287	156.568	SR 21 – Montgomery, Monroeville	Eastern terminus
1.000 mi = 1.609 km; 1.000 km = 0.621 mi: Concurrency terminus

== Truck route ==
=== Camden truck route ===
State Route 28 Truck
- Location: Camden
- Length: 1.6 mi (2.6 km)

=== Major intersections ===
The entire route is in Wilcox County.

Location	mi	km	Destinations	Notes
Camden	0.00	0.00	SR 10 west / SR 28 / SR 41 Truck south	Western terminus; western end of SR 10/SR 41 Truck concurrency
Camden	1.6	2.6	SR 10 east / SR 28 / SR 41 / SR 41 Truck ends	Eastern terminus; western end of SR 10/SR 41 Truck concurrency
1.000 mi = 1.609 km; 1.000 km = 0.621 mi
