= Alabama State Route 164 =

State highway in Alabama, United States

State Route 164

Route information
- Maintained by ALDOT
- Length: 2.548 mi (4.101 km)
- Existed: 1948–present

Major junctions
- West end: SR 10 / SR 41 Truck just west of Camden
- East end: SR 28 in Camden

Location
- Country: United States
- State: Alabama
- Counties: Wilcox

Highway system
- Alabama State Highway System; Interstate; US; State
← SR 163	→ I-165

State Route 164 (SR 164) is a 2.548-mile (4.101 km) route through Camden in Wilcox County in the west-central part of the state. The western terminus of the route is at its junction with SR 10/SR 41 Truck on the western outskirts of Camden. The eastern terminus of the route is at its junction with SR 28 in Camden.

== Route description ==
State Route 164 is approximately three miles long. It is aligned along the former route of State Route 10 as it approaches Camden from the west. The route connects State Route 10, which bypasses Camden to the north, and State Route 221, a western bypass of the town, with Camden along a two-lane route. The orientation of the route is east–west as it traverses its brief course.

== Major intersections ==
The entire route is in Wilcox County.

Location	mi	km	Destinations	Notes
Camden	0.0	0.0	SR 10 / SR 41 Truck to SR 221 – Oak Hill, Pine Apple, Yellow Bluff, Pine Hill	Western terminus
Camden	2.548	4.101	SR 28 (Broad Street) to SR 41 – Thomaston	Eastern terminus
1.000 mi = 1.609 km; 1.000 km = 0.621 mi
