= Alabama State Route 41 =

Highway in Alabama, United States

State Route 41

Route information
- Maintained by ALDOT
- Length: 127.484 mi (205.166 km)
- Existed: 1957–present

Major junctions
- South end: SR 87 at Florida state line south of Dixonville
- US 29 at Brewton; US 31 at Brewton; I-65 in Conecuh County; US 84 at Repton; US 80 at Selma
- North end: SR 14 at Selma

Location
- Country: United States
- State: Alabama
- Counties: Escambia, Conecuh, Monroe, Wilcox, Dallas

Highway system
- Alabama State Highway System; Interstate; US; State
← SR 40	→ SR 42

State Route 41 (SR 41) is a 127.484-mile-long (205.166 km) state highway in the southwestern part of the U.S. state of Alabama. The southern terminus of the highway is at the Florida state line near Dixonville in Escambia County, where the roadway continues as Florida State Road 87 (SR 87). The northern terminus of the highway is at its intersection with SR 14 at Selma.

== Route description ==
SR 41 is a continuation of Florida State Road 87, leading into Alabama from the Gulf coast beaches and Milton. SR 41 begins its route along a two-lane road south of the small town of Dixonville. North of Dixonville, SR 41 intersects U.S. Route 29 (US 29) south of Brewton. Northbound SR 41 and southbound US 29 share a brief wrong-way concurrency as they head into Brewton. This concurrency ends when the two highways intersect US 31 in Brewton, and US 29 joins US 31.

Just after entering Conecuh County, SR 41 intersects I-65, offering motorists a direct route from the Florida Panhandle to Montgomery and Birmingham. SR 41 continues its northward trajectory as it enters Monroe County. At Repton, the highway turns west as it joins US 84.

Near Monroeville, the highway once again turns north as it leaves US 84 and begins a brief concurrency with SR 21. SR 41 continues to the north until it reaches Camden, the county seat of Wilcox County. From there, the highway turns slightly to the northeast until it reaches its terminus east of Selma, at SR 14.

== History ==
SR 41 was formed in 1957. Until then, the route was designated as SR 93 between the Florida state line and Camden. From Camden to Selma, the route was designated as SR 43.

== Major intersections ==
County	Location	mi	km	Destinations	Notes
Escambia	Dixonville	0.000	0.000	SR 87 south – Milton	Florida state line; southern terminus
Escambia	East Brewton	6.532	10.512	US 29 north (SR 15) – Andalusia	Southern end of US 29/SR 15 concurrency
Escambia	Brewton	7.785	12.529	US 29 south / US 31 (St. Joseph Avenue / South Boulevard / SR 3 / SR 15 south) – Atmore, Evergreen, Conecuh County	Northern end of US 29/SR 15 concurrency
Conecuh		24.413	39.289	I-65 – Mobile, Montgomery	I-65 exit 77
Conecuh	Repton	35.026	56.369	US 84 east (SR 12) – Evergreen, Conecuh County	Southern end of US 84/SR 12 concurrency
Monroe		38.701	62.283	SR 136 west – Excel	Eastern terminus of SR 136
Monroe		42.403	68.241	SR 136 – Excel, Monroeville	
Monroe		42.819	68.911	US 84 west (SR 12) / SR 21 south / SR 47 Truck south to I-65 south – Grove Hill, Frisco City	Northern end of US 84/SR 12 concurrency; southern end of SR 21/SR 47 Truck concurrency
Monroe	Ollie	43.249	69.603	SR 136 east to I-65 north	Western terminus of SR 136
Monroe	Monroeville	45.596	73.380	SR 21 north / SR 47 Truck north (Martin Luther King Jr. Bypass) / SR 21 Bus. begins	North end of SR 21/SR 47 Truck concurrency; south end of SR 21 Bus. concurrency; no left turn southbound
Monroe	Monroeville	47.342– 47.443	76.190– 76.352	SR 21 Bus. north / SR 47 (Pineville Road / Claiborne Street) – Greenville	North end of SR 21 Bus. concurrency; traffic circle around Monroe County Heritage Museum
Wilcox		84.254	135.594	SR 41 Truck north / SR 221 north – Miller Ferry	Southern terminus of SR 41 Truck and SR 221
Wilcox	Camden	87.644	141.049	SR 28 west (Broad Street)	Southern end of SR 28 concurrency
Wilcox	Camden	87.692	141.127	SR 265 south (Claiborne Street)	Northern terminus of SR 265
Wilcox	Camden	88.387	142.245	SR 10 / SR 28 east / SR 28 Truck west / SR 41 Truck south – Oak Hill, Greenville, Pine Hill	Northern end of SR 28 concurrency; northern terminus of SR 41 Truck; eastern terminus of SR 28 Truck
Dallas		105.200	169.303	SR 89 south – Carlowville, Snow Hill	Northern terminus of SR 89
Dallas	Selmont-West Selmont	122.733	197.520	US 80 east / US 80 Bus. west (SR 8) – Selma, Montgomery	South end of US 80 concurrency
Dallas		125.042	201.236	SR 140 east	Western terminus of SR 140
Dallas	Selma	125.913	202.637	CR 48 (Water Avenue)	Interchange
Dallas	Selma	126.163	203.040	Race Street / J.L. Chestnut Jr. Boulevard	Interchange
Dallas	Selma	127.484	205.166	US 80 west / SR 14 (Highland Avenue) to SR 22 west	Northern terminus
1.000 mi = 1.609 km; 1.000 km = 0.621 mi: Concurrency terminus

== Truck route ==
=== Camden truck route ===
State Route 41 Truck
- Location: Camden
- Length: 4.7 mi (7.6 km)

=== Major intersections ===
The entire route is in Wilcox County.

Location	mi	km	Destinations	Notes
Camden	0.00	0.00	SR 41 / SR 221 begins – Greenville	Southern terminus; southern end of SR 221 concurrency
Camden	1.25	2.01	Airport Drive - Camden Municipal Airport	
Camden	1.885	3.034	SR 10 west / SR 221 north	Northern end of SR 221 concurrency; southern end of SR 10 concurrency
Camden	1.9	3.1	SR 164 east	Western end of SR 164
Camden	3.1	5.0	SR 28 / SR 28 Truck begins	Western terminus of SR 28 Truck; western end of SR 28 Truck concurrency
Camden	4.7	7.6	SR 10 east / SR 28 / SR 41 / SR 28 Truck ends	Northern terminus; northern end of SR 10/SR 28 Truck concurrency
1.000 mi = 1.609 km; 1.000 km = 0.621 mi
