= Alabama State Route 10 =

Highway in Alabama

State Route 10

Route information
- Maintained by ALDOT
- Length: 230.721 mi (371.309 km)

Major junctions
- West end: MS 19 at Mississippi state line near Yantley
- SR 17 at Butler; US 43 at Dixons Mills; SR 5 in southwestern Wilcox County; SR 21 at Oak Hill; I-65 at Greenville; US 31 at Greenville; US 29 / US 331 at Luverne; US 29 / US 231 at Troy; US 431 at Abbeville
- East end: SR 37 near Shorterville

Location
- Country: United States
- State: Alabama
- Counties: Choctaw, Marengo, Wilcox, Butler, Crenshaw, Pike, Barbour, Henry

Highway system
- Alabama State Highway System; Interstate; US; State
← I-10	→ US 11

State Route 10 (SR 10) is a major west–east state highway in the U.S. state of Alabama, running for 230.721 miles (371.309 km) through the southern part of the state. It is the lowest even-numbered route in the state that is not an unsigned partner route assigned to a U.S. Highway. It is also the only signed state route that extends from the Mississippi state line to the Georgia state line. The western terminus of the route is in northwestern Choctaw County near the community of Yantley, where it serves as a continuation of Mississippi Highway 19 (MS 19). The eastern terminus of the route is in Henry County near Shorterville. Once in Georgia, the route is designated as Georgia State Route 37 (SR 37).

== Route description ==
SR 10 begins its eastward journey at the Mississippi state line near Lisman, where it continues westward as Mississippi Highway 19. The highway passes through several small towns, including Butler and Sweet Water as it approaches its interchange with U.S. Highway 43 (SR 13) in Dixons Mills.

West of its interchange with Interstate 65 (I-65) at exit 128 in Greenville, the route passes through the Black Belt, traditionally one of the poorer areas of the state. SR 10 then passes through Luverne, Troy, and Abbeville, before reaching the Chattahoochee River at the Georgia state line, where it continues eastward as Georgia State Route 37.

There is a low (10 feet (3.0 m)) clearance under a railroad underpass in Greenville.

== Major intersections ==
County	Location	mi	km	Destinations	Notes
Choctaw		0.000	0.000	MS 19 north – Meridian	Mississippi state line
Choctaw	Butler	17.582	28.295	SR 17 – York, Chatom, Choctaw County Historical Museum, Mobile	
Choctaw		26.502	42.651	SR 114 east – Pennington	Western terminus of SR 114
Marengo		31.078	50.015	SR 69 – Linden, Coffeeville	
Marengo	Dixons Mills	45.662	73.486	US 43 (SR 13) – Linden, Thomasville	
Marengo	Vineland	53.461	86.037	SR 25 – Thomaston	
Wilcox	Pine Hill	59.171	95.226	SR 5 – Selma, Thomasville	
Wilcox		75.043	120.770	SR 221 / SR 41 Truck north – Linden, Monroeville	Southern end of SR 41 Truck concurrency
Wilcox		75.240	121.087	SR 164 east	Western terminus of SR 164
Wilcox	Camden	77.361	124.500	SR 28 / SR 28 Truck east – Linden, Camden	Western end of SR 28 Truck concurrency
Wilcox	Camden	79.361	127.719	SR 28 / SR 41 / SR 28 Truck west / SR 41 Truck south – Selma, Camden	Northern end of SR 28 Truck/SR 41 Truck concurrency; western end of SR 28 concurrency
Wilcox		82.939	133.477	SR 28 east – Hayneville, Montgomery	Eastern end of SR 28 concurrency
Wilcox	Oak Hill	92.515	148.888	SR 21 – Montgomery, Selma, Monroeville	
Wilcox	Mater	103.166	166.030	SR 47 south – Monroeville	Northern terminus of SR 47
Butler	Greenville	120.919	194.600	I-65 / SR 10 Truck east – Montgomery, Mobile	I-65 exit 128; western terminus of SR 10 Truck
Butler	Greenville	122.952	197.872	SR 185 (College Street)	
Butler	Greenville	124.628	200.569	SR 245 north / SR 10 Truck west / SR 185 Truck north (Greenville By-Pass) to I-65 – Fort Deposit, Airport	Western end of SR 185 Truck concurrency; southern terminus of SR 245
Butler	Greenville	125.230	201.538	US 31 (SR 3) / SR 185 Truck south – Montgomery, Mobile, Georgiana	Eastern end of SR 185 Truck concurrency
Crenshaw	Rutledge	146.324	235.486	US 331 north (SR 9) – Montgomery	Western end of US 331/SR 9 concurrency
Crenshaw	Luverne	148.118	238.373	US 29 south / US 331 south (SR 9/SR 15) – Florala, Andalusia, Brantley, Fort Walton Beach	Eastern end of US 331/SR 9 concurrency; western end of US 29/SR 15 concurrency
Pike	Troy	168.272	270.808	US 29 north (SR 15) / US 231 north (SR 53) – Troy, Union Springs, Montgomery	Interchange; eastern end of US 29/SR 15 concurrency; western end of US 231/SR 53 concurrency
Pike	Troy	170.347	274.147	SR 87 south / SR 167 south (Elba Highway) – Enterprise, Elba	Northern terminus of SR 87/SR 167
Pike	Brundidge	179.592	289.025	US 231 south (SR 53) / CR 3316 west (Sara G. Lott Boulevard) – Ozark	Eastern end of US 231/SR 53 concurrency
Pike	Brundidge	180.498	290.483	SR 93 (Main Street) – Banks	
Barbour	Clio	193.323	311.123	SR 51 – Louisville, Ariton	
Barbour		197.034	317.095	SR 131 north – Eufaula	Southern terminus of SR 131
Barbour		206.160	331.782	SR 105 south / CR 54 north – Ozark	Northern terminus of SR 105
Henry	Abbeville	215.179	346.297	US 431 (SR 1) – Eufaula, Dothan	
Henry	Abbeville	217.330	349.759	SR 27 south (Kirkland Street) – Dothan	
Henry	Abbeville	217.479	349.999	SR 95 (Bradley Street/Franklin Street) – Columbia, Airport	
Henry		230.721	371.309	SR 37 east – Fort Gaines	Georgia state line (Chattahoochee River bridge)
1.000 mi = 1.609 km; 1.000 km = 0.621 mi: Concurrency terminus

== Greenville truck route ==
State Route 10 Truck
- Location: Greenville
- Length: 5.123 mi (8.245 km)

Alabama State Route 10 Truck (SR 10 Truck) is a truck route of SR 10 around downtown Greenville. The highway runs 5.123 miles (8.245 km) between SR 10 and I-65 on the west side of town to SR 10, and SR 185 Truck east of the community. The truck route allows large vehicles to bypass the roundabout at the county courthouse downtown.

The entire route is in Greenville, Butler County.

mi	km	Destinations	Notes
0.000	0.000	I-65 south / SR 10 (Pineapple Highway) – Mobile, Greenville, Pine Apple	Western terminus; west end of I-65 overlap; I-65 exit 128
2.385	3.838	I-65 north / SR 185 north (Fort Dale Road) – Montgomery	East end of I-65 overlap; west end of SR 185 overlap
2.546	4.097	SR 185 south (Fort Dale Road)	East end of SR 185 overlap; west end of SR 185 Truck / SR 245 overlap; northern terminus of SR 185 Truck / SR 245
5.132	8.259	SR 10 / SR 185 Truck south (East Commerce Street) – Luverne	Eastern terminus; east end of SR 185 Truck / SR 245 overlap; southern terminus of SR 245
1.000 mi = 1.609 km; 1.000 km = 0.621 mi: Concurrency terminus
