= Alabama State Route 221 =

State highway in Alabama, United States

State Route 221

Route information
- Maintained by ALDOT
- Length: 6.381 mi (10.269 km)

Major junctions
- South end: SR 41 south of Camden
- SR 10 at Camden
- North end: SR 28 at Canton Bend

Location
- Country: United States
- State: Alabama
- Counties: Wilcox

Highway system
- Alabama State Highway System; Interstate; US; State
← SR 219	→ I-222

State Route 221 (SR 221) is a 6.381-mile-long (10.269 km) route that serves as a western bypass of Camden in Wilcox County.

== Route description ==
The southern terminus of SR 221 is located at its intersection with SR 41 to the southwest of Camden. From this point, the route travels in a northward direction on a two-lane undivided road, passing through a mix of farms and woods. The road passes to the east of Camden Municipal Airport before coming to an intersection with SR 10. Following this, SR 221 continues north through wooded areas with some homes. The route runs through a mix of farmland and woodland before coming to its northern terminus at SR 28 northwest of Camden at Canton Bend.

== Major intersections ==
The entire route is in Wilcox County.

Location	mi	km	Destinations	Notes
Camden	0.000	0.000	SR 41 / SR 41 Truck begins – Monroeville, Camden	Southern terminus of SR 221 and SR 41 Truck; southern end of SR 41 truck concurrency
Camden	1.25	2.01	Airport Drive - Camden Municipal Airport	
Camden	1.885	3.034	SR 10 / SR 41 Truck north – Yellow Bluff, Pine Hill, Camden	Northern end of SR 41 Truck concurrency
Canton Bend	6.381	10.269	SR 28 – Thomaston, Camden	Northern terminus
1.000 mi = 1.609 km; 1.000 km = 0.621 mi: Concurrency terminus
