= Alabama State Route 25 =

State highway in Alabama, United States

State Route 25
- SR 25 highlighted in red

Route information
- Maintained by ALDOT
- Length: 257.352 mi (414.168 km)

Major junctions
- South end: SR 5 near Pine Hill
- US 82 / SR 219 in Centreville; I-65 in Calera; US 78 / US 411 in Leeds; I-20 in Moody; I-759 in Gadsden; US 278 / US 431 in Gadsden
- North end: US 411 / SR 53 near Cave Springs, GA

Location
- Country: United States
- State: Alabama
- Counties: Wilcox, Marengo, Hale, Bibb, Shelby, Jefferson, St. Clair, Etowah, Cherokee

Highway system
- Alabama State Highway System; Interstate; US; State
← SR 24	→ SR 26

State Route 25 (SR 25) is a 257.352-mile-long (414.168 km) state highway in the U.S. state of Alabama. From U.S. Route 78 (US 78) in Leeds northeast to its terminus at the Georgia state line, SR 25 is the unsigned partner route of US 411. The southwestern terminus of SR 25 is at its intersection with SR 5 near Pine Hill in Wilcox County.

== Route description ==
Alabama State Route 25 is one of Alabama's longest state routes - and one of its most diverse.

After turning directly north away from Alabama State Route 5 in Sunny South, the route winds its way north to Greensboro, one of its largest cities in its portion west of Interstate 65.

After leaving Greensboro, the route winds north-northeast through the Talladega National Forest Oakmulgee District. Upon its second junction with SR-5, the route winds through Centreville before heading east-northeast through Montevallo, Calera, and Columbiana.

The portion of the route from Centreville to Vincent encompasses a portion of a wide eastern beltway of sorts around Birmingham with U.S. Route 231 and Alabama State Route 160.

In Wilsonville, the route turns due north and heads to its junction with US-231/280 in Harpersville. After a short concurrency with US-231, the route winds its way across Double Oak Mountain on a fairly curvy routing (See below). Upon reaching US-78 and US-411, signed SR-25 comes to an end as it winds north to the Georgia state line concurrent with aforementioned US-411.

When viewed on a map, SR-25 is among the most expansive state routes in the state, terrain and length-wise; with nearly 1000 ft of elevation gain along the path and passage through nine counties in the state.

== The Double Oak Mountain area ==
SR 25 traverses one of the higher peaks in the Birmingham area, Double Oak Mountain, connecting the Coosa and Cahaba River valleys. The roadway was constructed between 1914 and 1921 with support from Buffalo Rock founder Sidney Word Lee, who owned a 3,000-acre camp in Calcis. There is also a railroad line that travels parallel with SR 25 between Vincent and Leeds that tunnels through Double Oak Mountain below the highway.

The 19-mile (31 km) stretch of SR 25 between Vincent and Leeds is popular with motorcyclists and other outdoor enthusiasts. This road is off limits to heavy trucks except for local deliveries due to a large number of sharp curves, blind entrances and exits, and a narrow, elevated roadway. The small communities of Vandiver, Sterrett, Calcis, and Dunnavant straddle the highway in this area. The exclusive and private Shoal Creek Golf and Country Club, home of the 1984 and 1990 PGA Championships is located on Shelby County Route 41 not far from its intersection with SR 25.

== Major intersections ==
County	Location	mi	km	Destinations	Notes
Wilcox	Sunny South	0.000	0.000	SR 5 – Pine Hill, Thomasville	Southern terminus
Marengo	Vineland	4.639	7.466	SR 10 – Butler, Pine Hill	
Marengo	Thomaston	21.134	34.012	SR 28 – Linden, Catherine	
Marengo		36.041	58.002	US 80 (SR 8) – Demopolis, Uniontown	
Hale	Greensboro	51.871	83.478	SR 69 south – Demopolis, Linden	Southern end of SR 69 concurrency
Hale	Greensboro	52.725	84.853	SR 14 west – Eutaw	Southern end of SR 14 concurrency
Hale	Greensboro	53.074	85.414	SR 14 east – Marion	Northern end of SR 14 concurrency
Hale	Greensboro	53.348	85.855	SR 69 north – Moundville	Northern end of SR 69 concurrency
Bibb		84.730	136.360	SR 5 south – Marion	Southern end of SR 5 concurrency
Bibb	Brent	87.749	141.218	SR 5 north – West Blocton	Northern end of SR 5 concurrency
Bibb	Brent	90.563	145.747	CR 58 west – Tuscaloosa	former US 82 west
Bibb	Centreville	91.323	146.970	SR 219 north – West Blocton, Birmingham	Southern end of SR 219 concurrency
Bibb	Centreville	91.623	147.453	US 82 east / SR 219 south (SR 6) / SR 58 east – Montgomery, Selma, Business District, Airport	Northern end of SR 219 concurrency; southern end of US 82/SR 6
Bibb	Centreville	91.935	147.955	SR 209 south (Valley Street)	Former southern end of SR 209 concurrency
Bibb	Centreville	92.543	148.934	US 82 west – Tuscaloosa	Interchange; northern end of US 82/SR 6/SR former northern terminus of SR 209
Shelby		108.978	175.383	SR 139 south – Maplesville, Selma	Northern terminus of SR 139
Shelby	Montevallo	111.893	180.074	SR 119 north – Montevallo, University of Montevallo, American Village, Alabama National Cemetery	Southern terminus of SR 119
Shelby	Montevallo	112.415	180.914	SR 155 north – Montevallo, University of Montevallo, American Village, Alabama National Cemetery	Southern end of SR 155 concurrency
Shelby	Montevallo	113.339	182.401	SR 155 south – Jemison	Northern end of SR 155 concurrency
Shelby	Calera	118.557	190.799	US 31 south (SR 3) – Montgomery, Clanton	Southern end of US 31 concurrency
Shelby	Calera	118.717	191.056	US 31 north (SR 3) – Birmingham	Northern end of US 31/SR 3 concurrency
Shelby	Calera	119.525	192.357	I-65 – Birmingham, Montgomery	I-65 exit 228
Shelby	Columbiana	129.050	207.686	SR 70 west (West College Street) – Alabaster, Columbiana	Eastern terminus of SR 70
Shelby	Harpersville	142.820	229.847	SR 76 east – Childersburg, Sylacauga	Western terminus of SR 76
Shelby	Harpersville	147.183	236.868	US 231 south / US 280 (SR 38 / SR 53 south) – Birmingham, Childersburg, Sylacauga	Southern end of US 231/SR 53 concurrency
Shelby	Vincent	150.904	242.856	US 231 north (SR 53) – Pell City, Lincoln	Northern end of US 231/SR 53 concurrency
Jefferson	Leeds	169.276	272.423	US 78 west (SR 4 / Parkway Drive) / US 411 begins (9th Street NE)	Northern end of US 78/SR 4 concurrency; southern terminus of US 411; northern end of SR 25 as a signed route
SR 25 continues as the unsigned partner route of US 411
1.000 mi = 1.609 km; 1.000 km = 0.621 mi: Concurrency terminus
