= Dixonville =

Dixonville may refer to:

- Dixonville, Alabama, a small unincorporated community in Escambia County
- Dixonville, Alberta, a hamlet in the County of Northern Lights
- Dixonville, Florida, an unincorporated community and CDP in Santa Rosa County
- Dixonville, Indiana, a former unincorporated community in Guthrie Township, Lawrence County
- Dixonville, Oregon, an unincorporated community in Douglas County
- Dixonville, Pennsylvania, an unincorporated community in Indiana County
