= Pebble Hill, Alabama =

Unincorporated community in Alabama, United States

- Unincorporated community
- Location within the state of Alabama Pebble Hill, Alabama (the United States)
- Coordinates: 31°56′21″N 87°20′36″W
- Country: United States
- State: Alabama
- County: Wilcox
- Elevation: 194 ft (59 m)
- Time zone: UTC-6 (Central (CST))
  - Summer (DST): UTC-5 (CDT)
- Area code: 334
- GNIS feature ID: 156867

Pebble Hill, also known as Capell, is an unincorporated community in Wilcox County, Alabama, United States. Pebble Hill is located on Alabama State Route 41, 5.2 miles (8.4 km) southwest of Camden.

== History ==
A post office operated under the name Capell from 1895 to 1915.
