= Alabama State Route 136 =

Highway in Alabama

State Route 136

Route information
- Maintained by ALDOT
- Length: 6.151 mi (9.899 km)
- Existed: 1963–present

Major junctions
- West end: SR 21 south of Monroeville
- US 84 / SR 41 south of Monroeville
- East end: US 84 / SR 41 east of Excel

Location
- Country: United States
- State: Alabama
- Counties: Monroe

Highway system
- Alabama State Highway System; Interstate; US; State
| ← SR 135 | → SR 137 |

State Route 136 (SR 136) is a 6.151-mile (9.899 km) state highway in Monroe County in the southwestern part of the U.S. state of Alabama. The western terminus of the highway is at an intersection with SR 21 south of Monroeville. The eastern terminus of the route is at an intersection with U.S. Route 84 and SR 41 near the Monroe–Conecuh county line, at a point east of Excel.

== Route description ==
SR 136 is aligned along a two-lane road for its entire length. It begins at an intersection with SR 21 (South Alabama Avenue) just south of Monroeville. It travels to the south and intersects US 84 (internally designated as SR 12)/SR 41. It curves to the south-southwest and intersects the southern terminus of Monroe County Route 27 (CR 27; Sugar Hill Road). It then enters the small town of Excel, the birthplace of former Alabama Crimson Tide and Dallas Cowboys linebacker Lee Roy Jordan. There, it intersects both the eastern terminus of Monroe CR 23 (Excel–Frisco Highway) and the northern terminus of Monroe CR 18 (South Main Street). At this intersection, SR 136 turns left and begins traveling to the east. One block later is an intersection with the northern terminus of Monroe CR 35 (Kelly Avenue). It passes Excel Cemetery before leaving the city limits of Excel. Just after leaving Excel, the highway crosses over Corley Creek. Farther to the east is an intersection with Monroe CR 37 (Dottelle Road). It then curves to the east-northeast and reaches its eastern terminus, a second intersection with US 84/SR 41.

== History ==
SR 136 was formed in 1963 along the former route of SR 21 heading eastward from Monroeville.

== Major intersections ==
The entire route is in Monroe County.

| Location | mi | km | Destinations | Notes |
|---|---|---|---|---|
| | 0.000 | 0.000 | SR 21 – Monroe Academy, Alabama Southern Community College Monroeville Campus | Western terminus |
| | 0.574 | 0.924 | US 84 (SR 12) / SR 41 to I-65 north | |
| | 6.151 | 9.899 | US 84 (SR 12) / SR 41 – Grove Hill, Evergreen, Conecuh County | Eastern terminus |
1.000 mi = 1.609 km; 1.000 km = 0.621 mi
