= Dunnavant, Alabama =

- Census-designated place
- Location of Dunnavant in Shelby County, Alabama.
- Coordinates: 33°30′45″N 86°31′30″W
- Country: United States
- State: Alabama
- County: Shelby

Area
  - Total: 20.27 sq mi (52.51 km^{2})
  - Land: 19.25 sq mi (49.87 km^{2})
  - Water: 1.02 sq mi (2.64 km^{2})
- Elevation: 705 ft (215 m)

Population (2020)
  - Total: 936
  - Density: 48.6/sq mi (18.77/km^{2})
- Time zone: UTC-6 (Central (CST))
  - Summer (DST): UTC-5 (CDT)
- Area codes: 205, 659
- GNIS feature ID: 2582671

Dunnavant, also spelled Dunavant, is a census-designated place and unincorporated community in northern Shelby County, Alabama, United States. As of the 2020 census, Dunnavant had a population of 936. The community's name is probably derived from a local family. A post office was established in 1897 and was in operation until it was closed in 1958.

== Geography ==
Dunnavant is in central Alabama, in the southernmost extensions of the Appalachian Mountains along Alabama State Route 25 and Shelby County Road 41. Leeds is 6 mi (10 km) north, and the unincorporated community of Vandiver is 4 mi (6 km) southeast on a windy and mountainous route. Shelby County 41 leads southwest as Dunnavant Valley Rd 15 mi (24 km) to Chelsea.

== Demographics ==
Historical population
| Census | Pop. | Note | %± |
|---|---|---|---|
| 2010 | 981 | | — |
| 2020 | 936 | | −4.6% |
U.S. Decennial Census

Dunnavant was first listed as a census designated place in the 2010 U.S. census.

Dunnavant CDP, Alabama – Racial and ethnic composition Note: the US Census treats Hispanic/Latino as an ethnic category. This table excludes Latinos from the racial categories and assigns them to a separate category. Hispanics/Latinos may be of any race.
| Race / Ethnicity (NH = Non-Hispanic) | Pop 2010 | Pop 2020 | % 2010 | % 2020 |
|---|---|---|---|---|
| White alone (NH) | 936 | 849 | 95.41% | 90.71% |
| Black or African American alone (NH) | 4 | 14 | 0.41% | 1.50% |
| Native American or Alaska Native alone (NH) | 7 | 6 | 0.71% | 0.64% |
| Asian alone (NH) | 0 | 3 | 0.00% | 0.32% |
| Native Hawaiian or Pacific Islander alone (NH) | 0 | 0 | 0.00% | 0.00% |
| Other race alone (NH) | 0 | 2 | 0.00% | 0.21% |
| Mixed race or Multiracial (NH) | 11 | 32 | 1.12% | 3.42% |
| Hispanic or Latino (any race) | 23 | 30 | 2.34% | 3.21% |
| Total | 981 | 936 | 100.00% | 100.00% |
