= Alabama State Route 89 =

State highway in Alabama, United States

State Route 89

Route information
- Maintained by ALDOT
- Length: 11.815 mi (19.014 km)
- Existed: 1957–present

Major junctions
- South end: SR 21 near Snow Hill
- North end: SR 41 in Elm Bluff

Location
- Country: United States
- State: Alabama
- Counties: Wilcox, Dallas

Highway system
- Alabama State Highway System; Interstate; US; State
| ← SR 88 | → US 90 |

State Route 89 (SR 89) is a 11.815-mile-long (19.014 km) state highway in the south-central part of the U.S. state of Alabama. The southern terminus of the highway is at an intersection with SR 21 near Snow Hill, an unincorporated community in Wilcox County approximately 14 miles (23 km) east of Camden. The northern terminus of the highway is at an intersection with SR 41 approximately 22 miles (35 km) south of Selma in southern Dallas County.

== Route description ==
SR 89 travels through the heart of Alabama's Black Belt, recognized as one of the poorer areas of the state. The highway serves as an extension of the northbound leg of SR 21, which turns eastwardly in eastern Wilcox County. The path of SR 89 travels through rural areas and does not traverse any incorporated communities. The northern terminus of the highway is in Dallas County at Elm Bluff.

== History ==
SR 89 was created in 1957 as a renumbering of the last portion of the former SR 100 (the remainder was replaced by new SR 21). SR 89 was previously assigned to the road from Spanish Fort to the Georgia border; this became part of an extended SR 42 in 1957.

== Major intersections ==
| County | Location | mi | km | Destinations | Notes |
|---|---|---|---|---|---|
| Wilcox | | 0.000 | 0.000 | SR 21 – Montgomery, Camden, Monroeville | Southern terminus |
| Dallas | Elm Bluff | 11.815 | 19.014 | SR 41 – Camden, Selma | Northern terminus |
1.000 mi = 1.609 km; 1.000 km = 0.621 mi
