= Camden Airport =

Camden Airport may refer to:

- Camden Airport (New South Wales), an airport located in Camden, New South Wales, Australia
- Camden Airstrip, an airfield in Couva, Trinidad and Tobago
- Camden Central Airport, a defunct airport located in Camden, New Jersey, United States
- Camden County Airport, an airport near Berlin, New Jersey. United States
- Camden Municipal Airport, an airport located in Camden, Alabama, United States
- Harrell Field, an airport located in Camden, Arkansas, United States
