= Bethel, Alabama =

Unincorporated community in Alabama, United States

- Unincorporated community
- Location within Alabama Location within the United States
- Coordinates: 32°08′28″N 87°28′30″W
- Country: United States
- State: Alabama
- County: Wilcox
- Elevation: 128 ft (39 m)
- Time zone: UTC-6 (Central (CST))
  - Summer (DST): UTC-5 (CDT)
- Area code: 334
- GNIS feature ID: 138428

Bethel is an unincorporated community in Wilcox County, Alabama, United States.

== History ==
A post office operated under the name Bethel from 1831 to 1911.
