= Rockwest, Alabama =

Unincorporated community in Alabama, United States

- Unincorporated community
- Location within the state of Alabama Rockwest, Alabama (the United States)
- Coordinates: 31.99987°N 87.37165°W
- Country: United States
- State: Alabama
- County: Wilcox
- Elevation: 128 ft (39 m)
- Time zone: UTC-6 (Central (CST))
  - Summer (DST): UTC-5 (CDT)
- Area code: 334

Rockwest, also known as Possum Bend, is an unincorporated community in Wilcox County, Alabama.
