= Arlington, Alabama =

Unincorporated community in Alabama, United States

- Unincorporated community
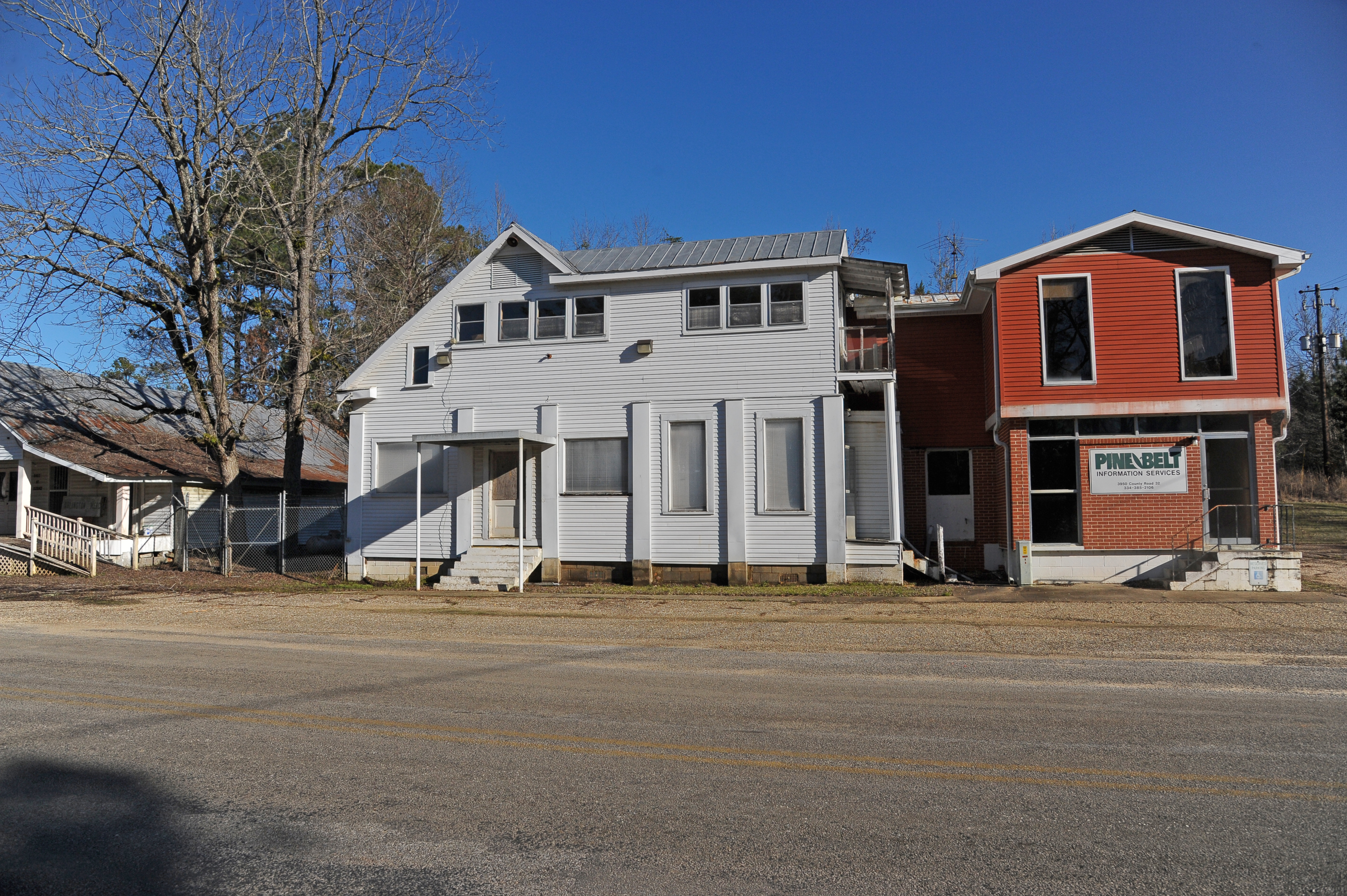
- Downtown Arlington, Alabama

- Location within the state of Alabama Arlington, Alabama (the United States)
- Coordinates: 32°3′25.53″N 87°35′19.01″W
- Country: United States
- State: Alabama
- County: Wilcox
- Elevation: 194 ft (59 m)
- Time zone: UTC-6 (Central (CST))
  - Summer (DST): UTC-5 (CDT)
- ZIP code: 36722
- Area code: 334

Arlington, originally known as Dumas Store, is an unincorporated community in Wilcox County, Alabama, United States.

== Geography ==
Arlington is located at 32.05709°N 87.5886°W and has an elevation of 194 feet (59 m).

== Demographics ==
According to the returns from 1850-2010 for Alabama, it has never reported a population figure separately on the U.S. Census.
