= Fred Whitfield (baseball) =

American baseball player (1938–2013)

- First baseman
- Born: January 7, 1938; Vandiver, Alabama, U.S.
- Died: January 31, 2013 (aged 75); Gadsden, Alabama, U.S.
- Batted: Left Threw: Left

MLB debut
- May 27, 1962, for the St. Louis Cardinals

Last MLB appearance
- August 11, 1970, for the Montreal Expos

MLB statistics
- Batting average: .253
- Home runs: 108
- Runs batted in: 356
- Stats at Baseball Reference

Teams
- St. Louis Cardinals (1962); Cleveland Indians (1963–1967); Cincinnati Reds (1968–1969); Montreal Expos (1970)

Fred Dwight Whitfield (January 7, 1938 – January 31, 2013) was an American professional baseball player. A first baseman, he appeared in the Major Leagues from 1962 to 1970, primarily for the Cleveland Indians and also for with the St. Louis Cardinals, Cincinnati Reds and Montreal Expos. Nicknamed "Wingy" for his unique throwing motion, he threw and batted left-handed, stood 6 feet 1 inch (1.85 m) tall and weighed 190 pounds (86 kg).

He was born in Vandiver, Alabama, one of four children of William Theodore and Inez Clarice (Brasher) Whitfield. He attended Woodlawn High School in Birmingham, Alabama. At age 19, he married Helen Leverton of Gadsden, Alabama on February 9, 1957 and their household eventually numbered six children.

Whitfield was signed by the Cardinals as an amateur free agent in 1956. He made his big league debut at age 24 on May 27, 1962. Pinch-hitting for future Baseball Hall of Famer Bob Gibson, he drew a walk off Bob Shaw of the Milwaukee Braves, but was promptly erased in a double play. Two days later he made his first start, going 1-for-4 at Pittsburgh’s Forbes Field, with his first hit a fourth inning RBI single off Al McBean that scored Red Schoendienst.

His prime seasons were 1963–66, with seasons of 21, 10, 26 and 27 home runs with a single-season high of 27 (fifth in the American League) in 1966 and single-season highs in 1965 with a .293 batting average and 90 runs batted in. He was named first baseman on the 1965 The Sporting News American League all-star team.

His career batting average was .253 with a total of 108 home runs and 356 runs batted in.

After leaving baseball, he was employed as a shipping clerk by Anderson Electric in Vandiver. He was an avid outdoorsman and enjoyed playing bluegrass music and gospel music on his guitar and was active in a gospel group that included his wife and other family members.

He died of complications from non-Hodgkin's lymphoma at age 75 on January 31, 2013. His survivors included his wife of nearly 56 years, Helen; a daughter and five sons and their spouses; and many grandchildren and great-grandchildren.
