= Dixonville, Florida =

- Unincorporated community
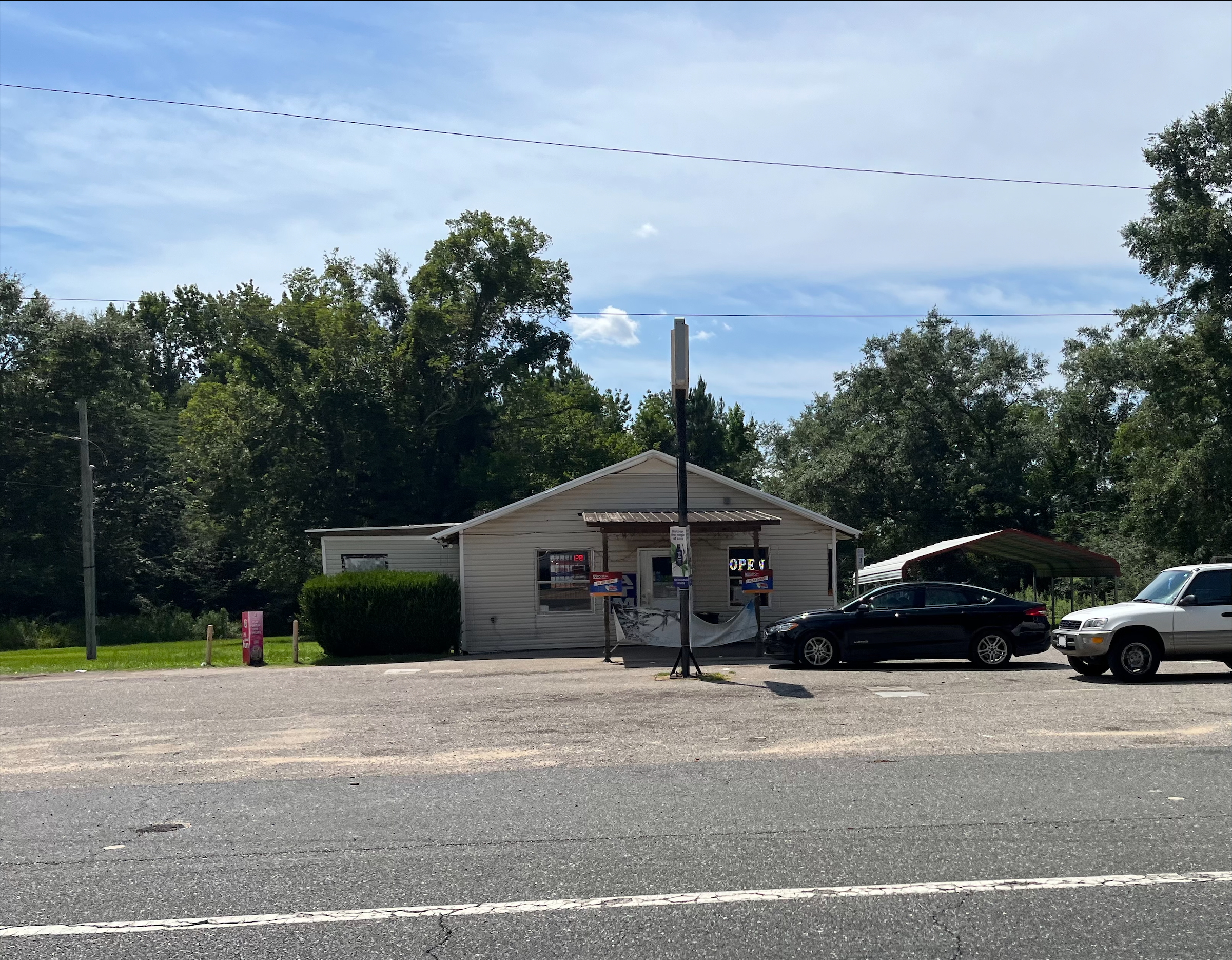
- Store in Dixonville

- Location within Florida Location within the United States
- Coordinates: 30°59′11″N 87°02′28″W
- Country: United States
- State: Florida
- County: Santa Rosa

Area
  - Total: 4.990 sq mi (12.92 km^{2})
  - Land: 4.969 sq mi (12.87 km^{2})
  - Water: 0.021 sq mi (0.054 km^{2})
- Elevation: 276 ft (84 m)

Population (2020)
  - Total: 195
  - Density: 39.2/sq mi (15.2/km^{2})
- Time zone: UTC-6 (Central (CST))
  - Summer (DST): UTC-5 (CDT)
- Area code: 850
- GNIS feature ID: 2652408

Dixonville is an unincorporated community and census-designated place in Santa Rosa County, Florida, United States. Its population was 195 at the 2020 census, up from 181 at the 2010 census. It is part of the Pensacola—Ferry Pass—Brent, Florida Metropolitan Statistical Area. Florida State Road 87 passes through the community. The community name continues north of the state line in Alabama along Alabama State Route 41.

== Geography ==
According to the U.S. Census Bureau, the community has an area of 4.990 square miles (12.92 km^{2}); 4.969 square miles (12.87 km^{2}) of its area is land, and 0.021 square miles (0.054 km^{2}) is water.

== Demographics ==
Dixonville first appeared as a census designated place in the 2010 U.S. census.
