= Alabama State Route 155 =

State highway in Alabama, United States

State Route 155

Route information
- Maintained by ALDOT
- Length: 10.890 mi (17.526 km)
- Existed: 1957–present

Major junctions
- South end: US 31 north of Jemison
- SR 25 in Montevallo
- North end: SR 119 in Montevallo

Location
- Country: United States
- State: Alabama
- Counties: Chilton, Shelby County

Highway system
- Alabama State Highway System; Interstate; US; State
← SR 154	→ SR 156

State Route 155 (SR 155) is a 10.890-mile-long (17.526 km) state highway in the central part of the U.S. state of Alabama. The southern terminus of the highway is at an intersection with U.S. Route 31 (US 31) just north of Jemison. The northern terminus of the highway is at an intersection with SR 119 in Montevallo.

== Route description ==
From its beginning at Jemison, SR 155 travels in a northwestward direction as it leaves Chilton County. Crossing into Shelby County, the highway continues, traveling through rural areas of the county. Southeast of Montevallo, the highway has an intersection with SR 25 and turns west, forming a brief wrong-way concurrency.

SR 155 diverts from SR 25 at Montevallo and resumes its northward trajectory. The northern terminus of the highway is at an intersection with SR 119 near the entrance to the campus of the University of Montevallo.

== Major intersections ==
County	Location	mi	km	Destinations	Notes
Chilton		0.000	0.000	US 31 (SR 3) – Jemison, Calera	Southern terminus
Shelby	Montevallo	9.408	15.141	SR 25 north – Calera	South end of SR 25 concurrency
Shelby	Montevallo	10.331	16.626	SR 25 south – Wilton, Centreville	North end of SR 25 concurrency
Shelby	Montevallo	10.890	17.526	SR 119 (Main Street) – Centreville, Alabaster	Northern terminus
1.000 mi = 1.609 km; 1.000 km = 0.621 mi: Concurrency terminus
