= Roland Cooper State Park =

State park in Wilcox County, Alabama, United States

- Location within Alabama
- Location: Wilcox County, Alabama, United States
- Coordinates: 32°03′26″N 87°14′57″W
- Area: 236 acres (96 ha)
- Elevation: 79 ft (24 m)
- Established: 1969
- Administrator: Alabama Department of Conservation and Natural Resources
- Designation: Alabama state park
- Website: Official website

Roland Cooper State Park is a public recreation area located six miles north of Camden, Alabama, on the eastern shore of Dannelly Reservoir, a 22,000-acre (8,900 ha) impoundment of the Alabama River known locally as the Millers Ferry Reservoir. The park features cottages, campground, fishing, and boating facilities.

== History ==
The 236-acre (96 ha) state park opened as Bridgeport State Park on land leased from the Army Corps of Engineers following the construction of Miller's Ferry Lock and Dam in 1969. The park was renamed for state senator William Roland Cooper in the 1970s. It was one of several Alabama state parks that were closed or saw curtailment of services in 2015 following state budget cuts. The park re-opened in 2016 under a management agreement with a private contractor. After seven years under private control, the State Parks Division of the Alabama Department of Conservation and Natural Resources resumed management of the park in 2023.
