= Calcis, Alabama =

- Unincorporated community
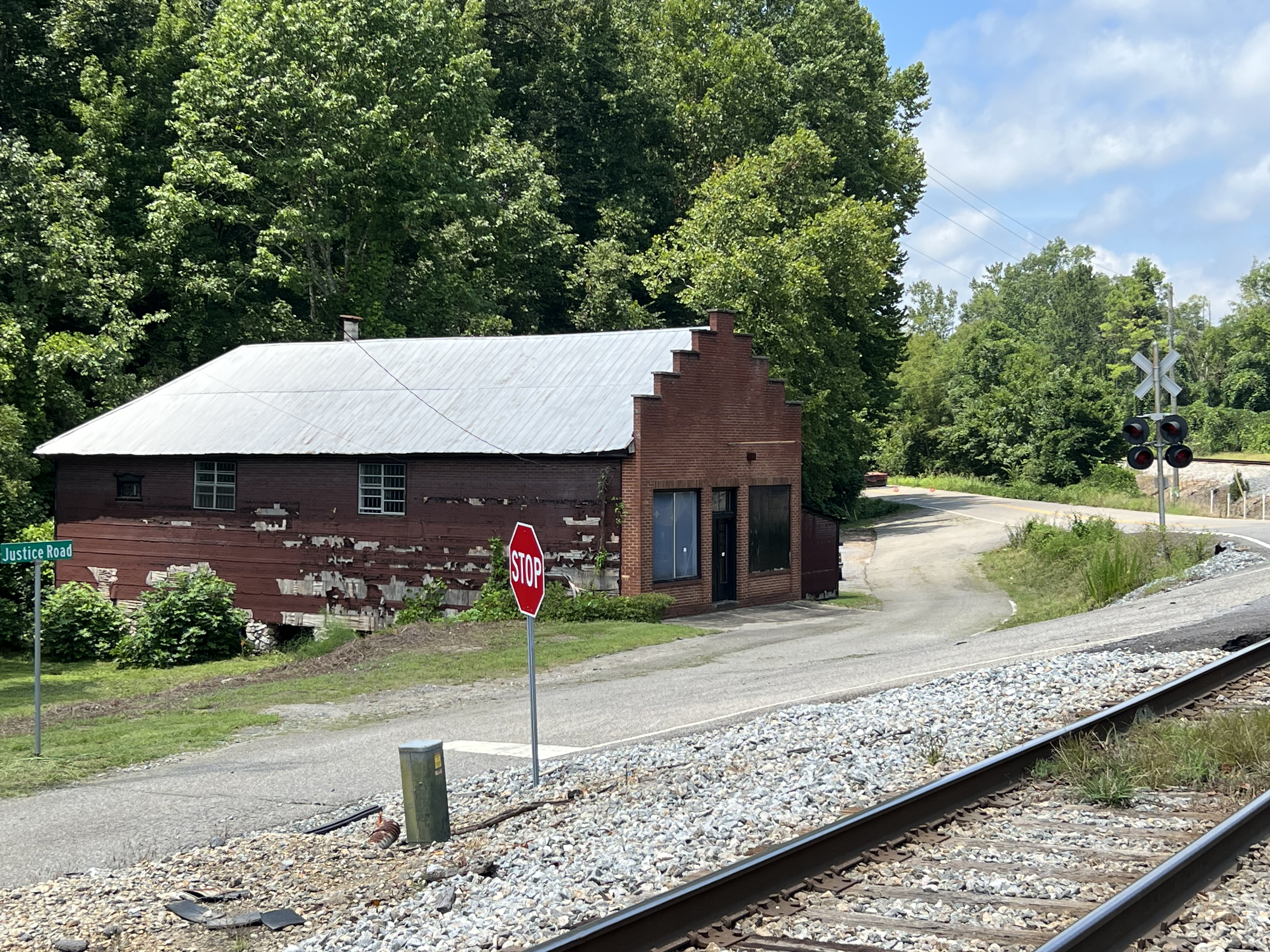
- Former H. R. Justice store and post office in Calcis. Alabama State Route 25 and Norfolk Southern Railway to right of photo.

- Location within Alabama Location within the United States
- Coordinates: 33°25′35″N 86°25′54″W
- Country: United States
- State: Alabama
- County: Shelby
- Elevation: 535 ft (163 m)
- Time zone: UTC-6 (Central (CST))
  - Summer (DST): UTC-5 (CDT)
- Area codes: 205, 659
- GNIS feature ID: 115387

Calcis is an unincorporated community in Shelby County, Alabama, United States, located along Alabama State Route 25, 3 miles (4.8 km) north-northwest of Vincent.

== History ==
The community's name is derived from the word calcium, in reference to the limestone that was mined in the local quarries. Calcis is located on the former Central of Georgia Railway and was once home to a passenger depot. The community attempted to have a second courthouse and county jail for Shelby County placed in Calcis and went as far as presenting the argument to the Supreme Court of Alabama.

The Tennessee Coal, Iron and Railroad Company operated a limestone quarry in Calcis. This limestone was shipped to Birmingham to be used as flux in iron-making. The limestone mined in Calcis was a type known as Trenton limestone. The Calcis Lime Works manufactured quicklime in Calcis. Convict labor was used in the Calcis quarries.

A post office was established in 1899, and was in operation until 1967.
