= Anne Manie, Alabama =

Unincorporated community in Alabama, United States

- Unincorporated community
- Location within the state of Alabama Anne Manie, Alabama (the United States)
- Coordinates: 32°3′10.53″N 87°34′15″W
- Country: United States
- State: Alabama
- County: Wilcox
- Elevation: 112 ft (34 m)
- Time zone: UTC-6 (Central (CST))
  - Summer (DST): UTC-5 (CDT)
- ZIP code: 36721
- Area code: 334

Anne Manie, sometimes spelled Annemanie, is an unincorporated community in Wilcox County, Alabama, United States. The community had a post office, with postmasters appointed from 1924 to 1964.

== Geography ==
Anne Manie is located at 32.05292°N 87.57083°W and has an elevation of 112 feet (34 m).

== Demographics ==
According to the returns from 1850-2010 for Alabama, it has never reported a population figure separately on the U.S. Census.
