= Belle R. Harrison =

American poet and author

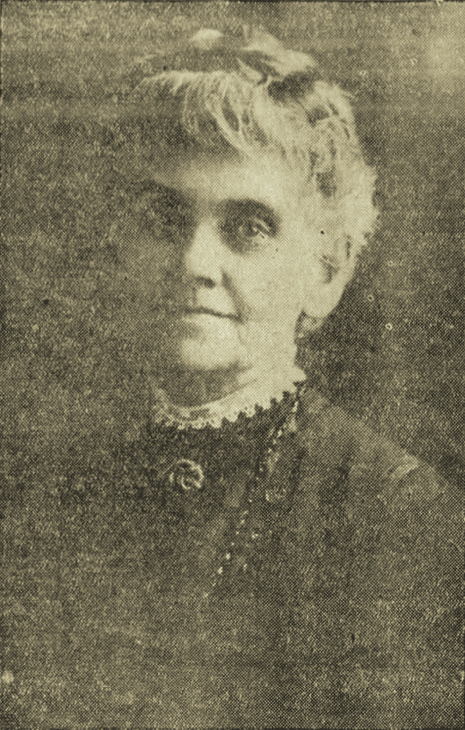
Belle R. Harrison (1924)

Belle R. Harrison (1856-1940) was a poet and short story author, and educator from Alabama. She was educated at Stafford school and the Tuscaloosa female college. Writing about the American South, she was the author of a collection of poems and a collection of short stories. She was a member of the United Daughters of the Confederacy (UDC) and was honored with a literary society named in her honor.

== Biography ==
Lucy Belle Richardson was born October 20, 1856, at Camden, Alabama. She was the daughter of Professor Warfield Creath Richardson (1823-1914) and Catherine Cole (Jones) Richardson (1833-1911). Her siblings were Clement (b. 1859) and Ida (b. 1861). She was educated at Stafford school and the uscaloosa female college.

Harrison was the author of, Poems, 1898, as well as a collection of negro short stories. She was a Methodist and a member of the UDC. Harrison served as president of the Kettledrum Club of Tuscaloosa.

On July 21, 1881, she married John Calhoun Harrison, of Tuscaloosa, Alabama, and they resided in that city. Their children were Katie (b. 1882) and Adeline (b. 1888).

== Death and legacy ==
Belle R. Harrison died in Tuscaloosa, December 4, 1940.

The Belle R. Harrison Literary Society was named in her honor.

== Selected works ==
=== Poems ===
- "Pomp's Defense", The Banner Weekly, 1893
- "How Many Cats Have We", The Chicago Ledger, 1898

=== Poetry collections ===
- Poems, 1898 (text)

=== Short story collections ===
- Pomp's People, 1929
