= Oak Hill, Alabama =

- Town
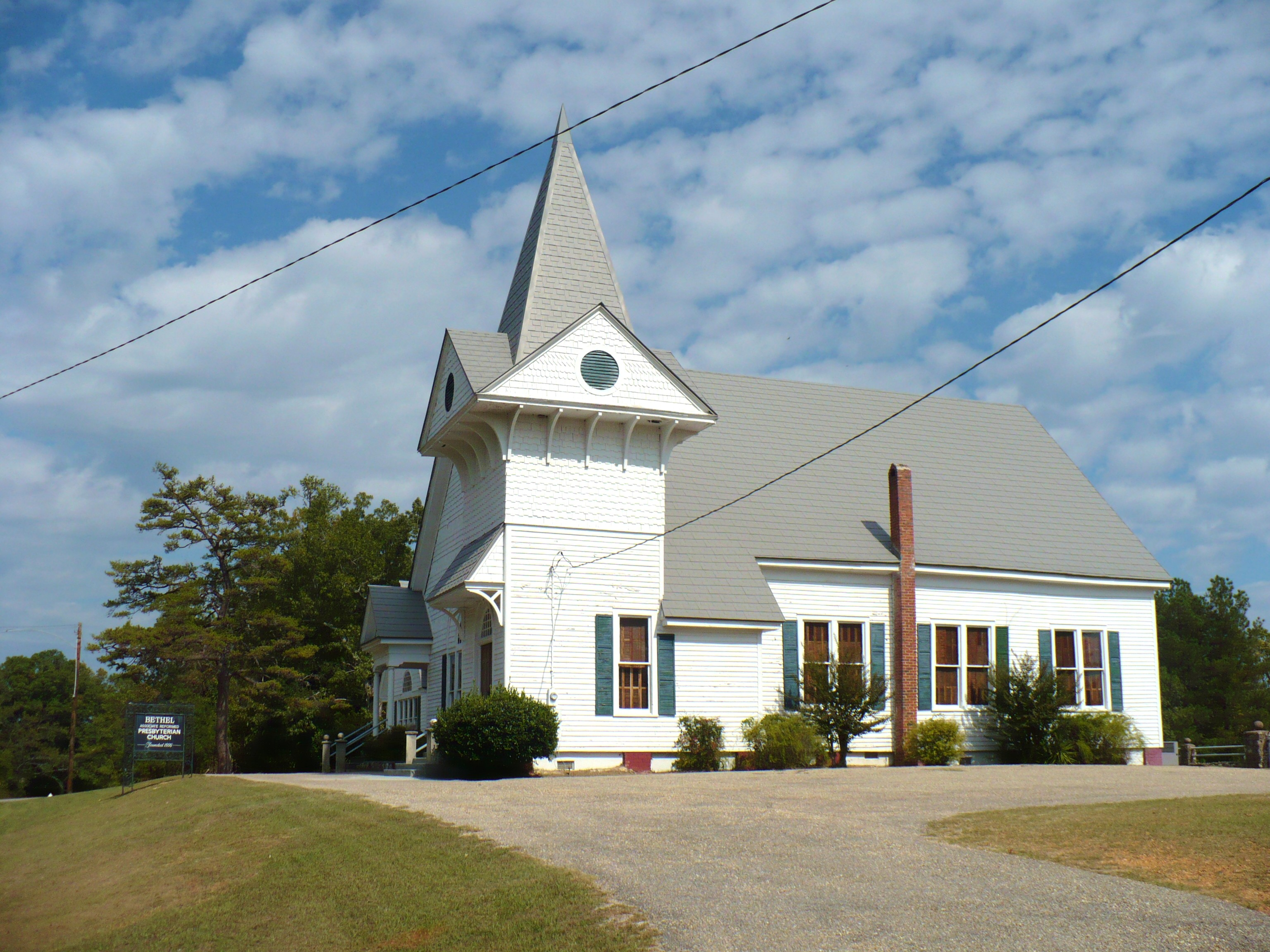
- Bethel Associate Reformed Presbyterian Church in Oak Hill, Wilcox County, Alabama.

- Location of Oak Hill in Wilcox County, Alabama.
- Coordinates: 31°55′18″N 87°05′07″W
- Country: United States
- State: Alabama
- County: Wilcox

Area
  - Total: 0.56 sq mi (1.45 km^{2})
  - Land: 0.56 sq mi (1.45 km^{2})
  - Water: 0 sq mi (0.00 km^{2})
- Elevation: 420 ft (130 m)

Population (2020)
  - Total: 14
  - Density: 25.0/sq mi (9.65/km^{2})
- Time zone: UTC-6 (Central (CST))
  - Summer (DST): UTC-5 (CDT)
- ZIP code: 36766
- Area code: 251
- GNIS feature ID: 2407019
- FIPS code: 01-55848
- Website: oakhillal.com

Oak Hill is a town in Wilcox County, Alabama, United States. According to the 1940 U.S. Census, it incorporated in 1938. Per the 2020 census, the population was 14. It is the smallest incorporated town in Alabama as of 2020, succeeding McMullen. The smallest unincorporated census-designated place in the state is also located in Wilcox County, that of Catherine, which had 22 residents as of 2010. With a median household income of $9,286 (compared to $44,758 for the state), Oak Hill is the poorest community in Alabama.

== Geography ==
According to the U.S. Census Bureau, the town has a total area of 0.6 square miles (1.6 km^{2}), all land.

== Demographics ==
Historical population
Census	Pop.	Note	%±
1940	159		—
1950	123		−22.6%
1960	116		−5.7%
1970	86		−25.9%
1980	63		−26.7%
1990	28		−55.6%
2000	37		32.1%
2010	26		−29.7%
2020	14		−46.2%
U.S. Decennial Census; 2010 2020

=== Racial and ethnic composition ===
Oak Hill town, Alabama – Racial and ethnic composition Note: the US Census treats Hispanic/Latino as an ethnic category. This table excludes Latinos from the racial categories and assigns them to a separate category. Hispanics/Latinos may be of any race.
Race / Ethnicity (NH = Non-Hispanic)	Pop 2000	Pop 2010	Pop 2020	% 2000	% 2010	% 2020
White alone (NH)	13	8	7	35.14%	30.77%	50.00%
Black or African American alone (NH)	24	18	6	64.86%	69.23%	42.86%
Native American or Alaska Native alone (NH)	0	0	0	0.00%	0.00%	0.00%
Asian alone (NH)	0	0	0	0.00%	0.00%	0.00%
Native Hawaiian or Pacific Islander alone (NH)	0	0	0	0.00%	0.00%	0.00%
Other race alone (NH)	0	0	1	0.00%	0.00%	7.14%
Mixed race or Multiracial (NH)	0	0	0	0.00%	0.00%	0.00%
Hispanic or Latino (any race)	0	0	0	0.00%	0.00%	0.00%
Total	37	26	14	100.00%	100.00%	100.00%

=== 2000 Census ===
As of the census of 2000, there were 37 people, 10 households, and 9 families residing in the town. The population density was 66.0 inhabitants per square mile (25.5/km^{2}). There were 19 housing units at an average density of 33.9 units per square mile (13.1 units/km^{2}). The racial makeup of the town was 64.86% Black or African American and 35.14% White.

Out of ten households, 40.0% had children under the age of 18 living with them, 70.0% were married couples living together, and 10.0% were non-families. No households were made up of individuals, and none had someone living alone who was 65 years of age or older. The average household size was 3.70 and the average family size was 3.78.

In the town, the population was spread out, with 27.0% under the age of 18, 10.8% from 18 to 24, 27.0% from 25 to 44, 32.4% from 45 to 64, and 2.7% who were 65 years of age or older. The median age was 30 years. For every 100 females, there were 85.0 males. For every 100 females age 18 and over, there were 125.0 males.

The median income for a household in the town was $31,250, and the median income for a family was $31,250. Males had a median income of $33,750 versus $0 for females. The per capita income for the town was $7,659. There were no families and none of the population living below the poverty line, including none under 18 and none of those over 64.

== Education ==
The sole school district in the county is the Wilcox County School District. The sole comprehensive high school of the district is Wilcox Central High School.

== Notable people ==
- Benjamin M. Miller, Governor of Alabama from 1931 to 1935
- Lillian Lehman, Actress
