= McWilliams, Alabama =

Unincorporated community in Alabama, United States

- Unincorporated community
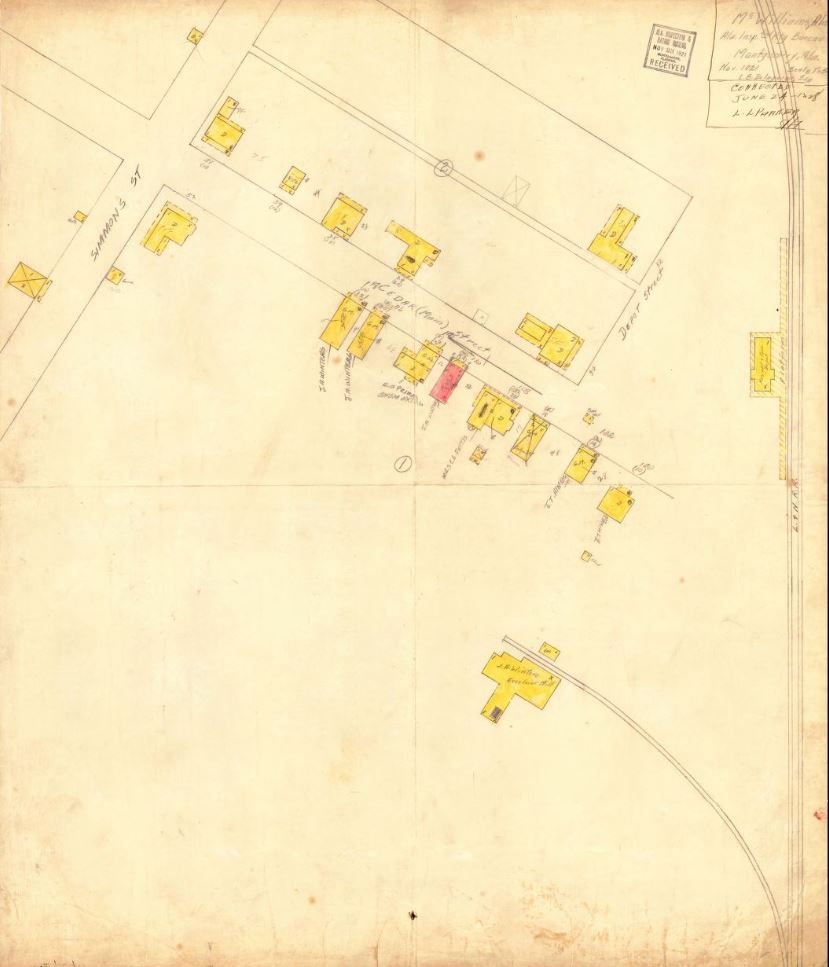
- 1921 fire insurance map of McWilliams

- Location within the state of Alabama McWilliams, Alabama (the United States)
- Coordinates: 31°49′51″N 87°5′37″W
- Country: United States
- State: Alabama
- County: Wilcox
- Elevation: 305 ft (93 m)
- Time zone: UTC-6 (Central (CST))
  - Summer (DST): UTC-5 (CDT)
- ZIP code: 36753
- Area code: 334

McWilliams is an unincorporated community in Wilcox County, Alabama, United States.

== History ==
The town is named for the general store established there by the McWilliams family, who migrated to South Alabama from the Orangeburg District of South Carolina. There are many McWilliamses of this root still living in Alabama. Another leading branch of the same family left Wilcox County and took up land patents at Blackwater in Kemper County, Mississippi.

The family produced Baptist preachers and deacons. Richebourg Gaillard McWilliams, a scholar of Birmingham Southern, hailed from this family, and Thomas E. "Shorty" McWilliams, an Army and Mississippi State running back, was from the Mississippi branch.

Some have also stated the community is likely named for Evander T. McWilliams, who served as the first postmaster. However, the McWilliams Family migrated to the Area well before 1900.

A post office first began operation under the name McWilliams in 1900.

McWilliams was formerly an incorporated community in the early 20th century. According to the 1910 U.S. Census, it incorporated in 1901. At some point after 1930, it either disincorporated or lost its charter.

== Demographics ==
Historical population
Census	Pop.	Note	%±
1910	184		—
1920	156		−15.2%
1930	248		59.0%
U.S. Decennial Census
