= Alabama State Route 119 =

State highway in Alabama, United States

State Route 119

Route information
- Maintained by ALDOT
- Length: 38 mi (61 km)
- Existed: 1953–present

Major junctions
- South end: SR 25 in Pelham
- US 31 in Alabaster; I-65 in Pelham; US 280 in Hoover
- North end: US 78 in Leeds

Location
- Country: United States
- State: Alabama
- Counties: St. Clair, Jefferson, Shelby

Highway system
- Alabama State Highway System; Interstate; US; State
← SR 118	→ SR 120

State Route 119 (SR 119) is a 38-mile-long (61 km) state highway in the U.S. state of Alabama that travels northeast from Pelham to Leeds. Although there are shorter and faster routes connecting Pelham and Leeds, SR 119 is a heavily traveled local highway that connects several suburbs and subdivisions in the suburbs of Birmingham. The southern terminus of SR 119 is at an intersection with SR 25 in Pelham, and the northern terminus of the highway is at an intersection with U.S. Route 78 (US 78) in Leeds.

== Route description ==
SR 119 begins as a two-lane route, traveling through Montevallo, the home of the University of Montevallo. Going northward, SR 119 travels through Alabaster, where it follows US 31 to Pelham, where it branches off into its own route once again in the Oak Mountain State Park area, then to the eastern area of Hoover, and then crosses US 280 before reaching its northern terminus at an intersection with US 78 in Leeds.

== History ==
Until the 1980s, much of the route of SR 119 traveled through rural areas of Shelby County. Suburban growth has led to commercial and residential growth adjoining the route. In 2005, a 4-mile-long (6.4 km) section of SR 119 south of US 31 in Alabaster was widened to four lanes.

== Major intersections ==
County	Location	mi	km	Destinations	Notes
Shelby	Montevallo	0.000	0.000	SR 25 – Wilton, Centreville, Calera	Southern terminus
Shelby	Montevallo	0.583	0.938	SR 155 south (Middle Street)	Northern terminus of SR 155
Shelby	Alabaster	11.574	18.627	US 31 south (SR 3) – Calera	South end of US 31 concurrency
Shelby	Pelham	18.396	29.605	US 31 north (SR 3) – Hoover	North end of US 31 concurrency
Shelby	Pelham	19.177	30.862	I-65 – Birmingham, Montgomery	I-65 exit 246
Shelby	Brook Highland–Meadowbrook line	27.975	45.021	US 280 (SR 38) – Birmingham, Chelsea	
Jefferson	Leeds	39.625	63.770	US 78 (Parkway Drive/SR 4) – Irondale, Pell City	Northern terminus
1.000 mi = 1.609 km; 1.000 km = 0.621 mi: Concurrency terminus
