= Fatama, Alabama =

Unincorporated community in Alabama, United States

- Unincorporated community
- Location within the state of Alabama Fatama, Alabama (the United States)
- Coordinates: 31°53′57″N 87°14′08″W
- Country: United States
- State: Alabama
- County: Wilcox
- Elevation: 397 ft (121 m)
- Time zone: UTC-6 (Central (CST))
  - Summer (DST): UTC-5 (CDT)
- Area code: 334
- GNIS feature ID: 157949

Fatama /fəˈtɑːmə/, also known as Fatima, is an unincorporated community in Wilcox County, Alabama, United States.

== History ==
The origin of the name Fatama is unknown, but is possibly derived from Fátima, Portugal. A post office operated under the name Fatama from 1855 to 1914.
