= Vandiver, Alabama =

- Census-designated place & Unincorporated community
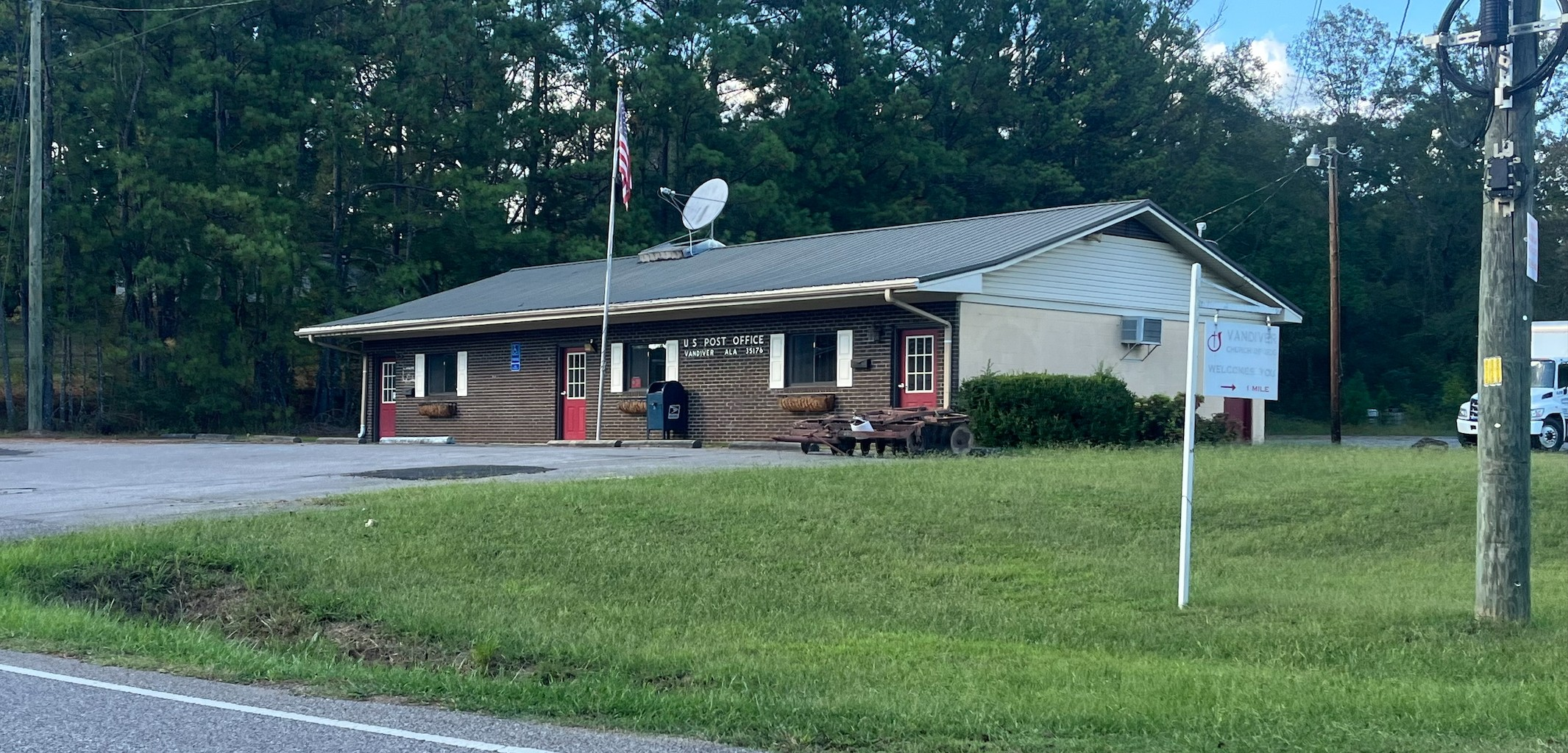
- Vandiver Post Office

- Location of Vandiver in Shelby County, Alabama.
- Coordinates: 33°29′08″N 86°28′56″W
- Country: United States
- State: Alabama
- County: Shelby

Area
  - Total: 20.85 sq mi (54.01 km^{2})
  - Land: 20.31 sq mi (52.60 km^{2})
  - Water: 0.54 sq mi (1.41 km^{2})
- Elevation: 531 ft (162 m)

Population (2020)
  - Total: 1,084
  - Density: 53.4/sq mi (20.61/km^{2})
- Time zone: UTC-6 (Central (CST))
  - Summer (DST): UTC-5 (CDT)
- Area codes: 205, 659
- GNIS feature ID: 128408

Vandiver is a census-designated place (CDP) and unincorporated community in Shelby County, Alabama, United States. Its population was 1,084 as of the 2020 census. One structure in Vandiver, the Falkner School, is listed on the Alabama Register of Landmarks and Heritage.

== Geography ==
The community is in the northeastern part of Shelby County. Alabama State Route 25 runs through the community, leading southeast 10 mi (16 km) to Vincent and north 10 mi (16 km) on an winding and mountainous route to the city of Leeds.

== Demographics ==
Historical population
Census	Pop.	Note	%±
2010	1,135		—
2020	1,084		−4.5%
U.S. Decennial Census

Vandiver was first listed as a census designated place in the 2010 U.S. census.

=== Racial and ethnic composition ===
Vandiver CDP, Alabama – Racial and ethnic composition Note: the US Census treats Hispanic/Latino as an ethnic category. This table excludes Latinos from the racial categories and assigns them to a separate category. Hispanics/Latinos may be of any race.
Race / Ethnicity (NH = Non-Hispanic)	Pop 2010	Pop 2020	% 2010	% 2020
White alone (NH)	1,101	973	97.00%	89.76%
Black or African American alone (NH)	8	31	0.70%	2.86%
Native American or Alaska Native alone (NH)	2	4	0.18%	0.37%
Asian alone (NH)	1	1	0.09%	0.09%
Native Hawaiian or Pacific Islander alone (NH)	0	0	0.00%	0.00%
Other race alone (NH)	1	3	0.09%	0.28%
Mixed race or Multiracial (NH)	6	42	0.53%	3.87%
Hispanic or Latino (any race)	16	30	1.41%	2.77%
Total	1,135	1,084	100.00%	100.00%

=== 2020 census ===
As of the 2020 census, Vandiver had a population of 1,084. The median age was 45.2 years. 19.8% of residents were under the age of 18 and 20.8% of residents were 65 years of age or older. For every 100 females there were 96.4 males, and for every 100 females age 18 and over there were 97.5 males age 18 and over.

0.0% of residents lived in urban areas, while 100.0% lived in rural areas.

There were 433 households in Vandiver, of which 23.6% had children under the age of 18 living in them. Of all households, 50.8% were married-couple households, 17.8% were households with a male householder and no spouse or partner present, and 27.0% were households with a female householder and no spouse or partner present. About 26.6% of all households were made up of individuals and 18.0% had someone living alone who was 65 years of age or older.

There were 515 housing units, of which 15.9% were vacant. The homeowner vacancy rate was 1.2% and the rental vacancy rate was 17.8%.

== Notable people ==
- Wes Helms, former Major League Baseball player
- Fred Whitfield, former Major League Baseball player
