= Catherine, Alabama =

- Census-designated place
- Location of Catherine in Wilcox County, Alabama.
- Coordinates: 32°11′10″N 87°28′12″W
- Country: United States
- State: Alabama
- County: Wilcox

Area
  - Total: 2.29 sq mi (5.94 km^{2})
  - Land: 2.29 sq mi (5.94 km^{2})
  - Water: 0 sq mi (0.00 km^{2})
- Elevation: 184 ft (56 m)

Population (2020)
  - Total: 65
  - Density: 28.3/sq mi (10.93/km^{2})
- Time zone: UTC-6 (Central (CST))
  - Summer (DST): UTC-5 (CDT)
- ZIP code: 36728
- Area code: 334
- FIPS code: 01-12544
- GNIS feature ID: 2628584

Catherine is an unincorporated community and census-designated place in northern Wilcox County, Alabama, United States. As of the 2020 census, its population was 65.

== Demographics ==
Historical population
| Census | Pop. | Note | %± |
|---|---|---|---|
| 2010 | 22 | | — |
| 2020 | 65 | | 195.5% |
U.S. Decennial Census; 2010 2020

Catherine was first listed as a census designated place in the 2010 U.S. census.

Catherine CDP, Alabama – Racial and ethnic composition Note: the US Census treats Hispanic/Latino as an ethnic category. This table excludes Latinos from the racial categories and assigns them to a separate category. Hispanics/Latinos may be of any race.
| Race / Ethnicity (NH = Non-Hispanic) | Pop 2010 | Pop 2020 | % 2010 | % 2020 |
|---|---|---|---|---|
| White alone (NH) | 16 | 21 | 72.73% | 32.31% |
| Black or African American alone (NH) | 6 | 37 | 27.27% | 56.92% |
| Native American or Alaska Native alone (NH) | 0 | 0 | 0.00% | 0.00% |
| Asian alone (NH) | 0 | 0 | 0.00% | 0.00% |
| Native Hawaiian or Pacific Islander alone (NH) | 0 | 0 | 0.00% | 0.00% |
| Other race alone (NH) | 0 | 0 | 0.00% | 0.00% |
| Mixed race or Multiracial (NH) | 0 | 0 | 0.00% | 0.00% |
| Hispanic or Latino (any race) | 0 | 7 | 0.00% | 10.77% |
| Total | 22 | 65 | 100.00% | 100.00% |

== Education ==
The sole school district in the county is the Wilcox County School District. The sole comprehensive high school of the district is Wilcox Central High School.

== Notable person ==
Jake Peavy, the professional baseball player, lives in Catherine.
