= Camden Municipal Airport =

Airport in Alabama, United States

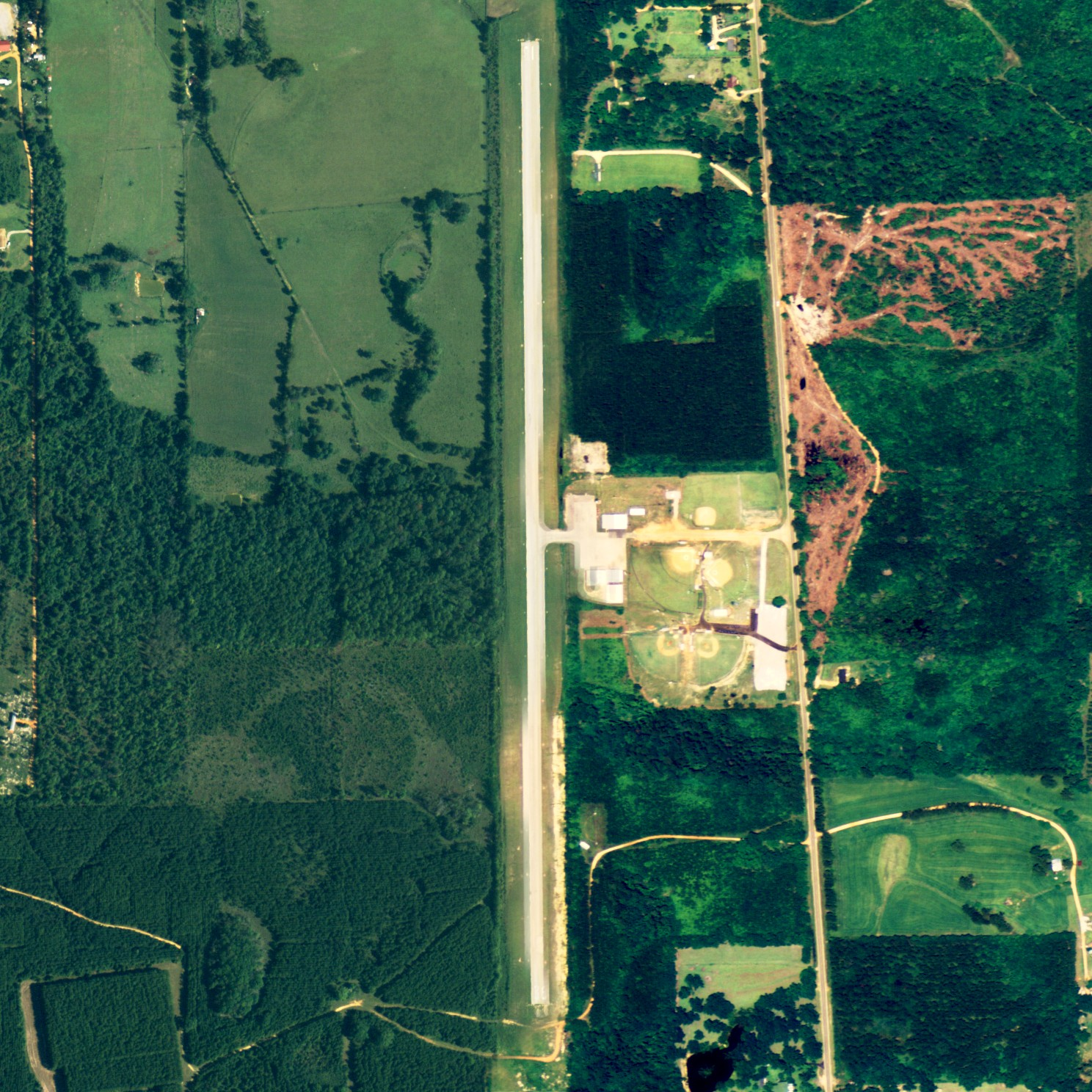
- NAIP aerial image, September 2006
- IATA: none; ICAO: none; FAA LID: 61A

Summary
- Airport type: Public
- Owner: City of Camden
- Serves: Camden, Alabama
- Elevation AMSL: 143 ft (44 m)
- Coordinates: 31°58′47″N 087°20′21″W

Map
- Location of airport in Alabama 61A (the United States)

Runways
| Direction | Length | | Surface |
| Direction | ft | m | Surface |
|---|---|---|---|
| 18/36 | 4,303 | 1,312 | Asphalt |

Statistics (2017)
- Aircraft operations: 3,248
- Based aircraft: 6
- Source: Federal Aviation Administration

Camden Municipal Airport (FAA LID: 61A) is a city-owned, public-use airport located three nautical miles (6 km) southwest of the central business district of Camden, a city in Wilcox County, Alabama, United States.

This airport is included in the FAA's National Plan of Integrated Airport Systems for 2011–2015 and 2009–2013, both of which categorized it as a general aviation facility.

== Facilities and aircraft ==
Camden Municipal Airport covers an area of 77 acres (31 ha) at an elevation of 143 feet (44 m) above mean sea level. It has one runway designated 18/36 with an asphalt surface measuring 4,303 by 80 feet (1,312 x 24 m).

For the 12-month period ending September 1, 2010, the airport had 3,248 general aviation aircraft operations, an average of 62 per week. At that time there were six aircraft based at this airport: 83% single-engine and 17% multi-engine.

== See also ==
- List of airports in Alabama
