= Yellow Bluff, Alabama =

- Town
- Location of Yellow Bluff in Wilcox County, Alabama.
- Coordinates: 31°57′44″N 87°28′38″W
- Country: United States
- State: Alabama
- County: Wilcox

Area
  - Total: 0.63 sq mi (1.62 km^{2})
  - Land: 0.63 sq mi (1.62 km^{2})
  - Water: 0 sq mi (0.00 km^{2})
- Elevation: 89 ft (27 m)

Population (2020)
  - Total: 208
  - Density: 332.1/sq mi (128.21/km^{2})
- Time zone: UTC-6 (Central (CST))
  - Summer (DST): UTC-5 (CDT)
- FIPS code: 01-83976
- GNIS feature ID: 2406925

Yellow Bluff is a town in Wilcox County, Alabama, United States. It incorporated in 1985. Per the 2020 census, the population was 208.

== Geography ==
According to the U.S. Census Bureau, the town has a total area of 0.5 square miles (1.3 km^{2}), all land.

== Demographics ==
Historical population
Census	Pop.	Note	%±
1990	245		—
2000	181		−26.1%
2010	188		3.9%
2020	208		10.6%
U.S. Decennial Census; 2010 2020

=== 2020 census ===
Yellow Bluff town, Alabama – Racial and ethnic composition Note: the US Census treats Hispanic/Latino as an ethnic category. This table excludes Latinos from the racial categories and assigns them to a separate category. Hispanics/Latinos may be of any race.
Race / Ethnicity (NH = Non-Hispanic)	Pop 2010	Pop 2020	% 2010	% 2020
White alone (NH)	1	3	0.53%	1.44%
Black or African American alone (NH)	187	205	99.47%	98.56%
Native American or Alaska Native alone (NH)	0	0	0.00%	0.00%
Asian alone (NH)	0	0	0.00%	0.00%
Pacific Islander alone (NH)	0	0	0.00%	0.00%
Some Other Race alone (NH)	0	0	0.00%	0.00%
Mixed Race or Multi-Racial (NH)	0	0	0.00%	0.00%
Hispanic or Latino (any race)	0	0	0.00%	0.00%
Total	188	208	100.00%	100.00%

=== 2000 Census ===
As of the census of 2000, there were 181 people, 67 households, and 48 families residing in the town. The population density was 334.5 inhabitants per square mile (129.2/km^{2}). There were 73 housing units at an average density of 134.9 per square mile (52.1/km^{2}). The racial makeup of the town was 92.82% Black or African American, 5.52% White, 1.10% Native American, and 0.55% from two or more races. 1.10% of the population were Hispanic or Latino of any race.

There were 67 households, out of which 34.3% had children under the age of 18 living with them, 28.4% were married couples living together, 41.8% had a female householder with no husband present, and 26.9% were non-families. 26.9% of all households were made up of individuals, and 11.9% had someone living alone who was 65 years of age or older. The average household size was 2.70 and the average family size was 3.31.

In the town, the population was spread out, with 29.8% under the age of 18, 8.3% from 18 to 24, 32.0% from 25 to 44, 14.4% from 45 to 64, and 15.5% who were 65 years of age or older. The median age was 33 years. For every 100 females, there were 77.5 males. For every 100 females age 18 and over, there were 64.9 males.

The median income for a household in the town was $11,389, and the median income for a family was $13,125. Males had a median income of $68,750 versus $16,250 for females. The per capita income for the town was $9,322. About 43.4% of families and 47.5% of the population were below the poverty line, including 50.0% of those under the age of 18 and 58.3% of those 65 or over.

== Education ==
The sole school district in the county is the Wilcox County School District. The sole comprehensive high school of the district is Wilcox Central High School.
