= Sunny South, Alabama =

Unincorporated community in Alabama, United States

- Unincorporated community
- Location within the state of Alabama Sunny South, Alabama (the United States)
- Coordinates: 31°57′53″N 87°38′24″W
- Country: United States
- State: Alabama
- County: Wilcox
- Elevation: 164 ft (50 m)
- Time zone: UTC-6 (Central (CST))
  - Summer (DST): UTC-5 (CDT)
- ZIP code: 36769
- Area code: 334

Sunny South is an unincorporated community in Wilcox County, Alabama.

== Geography ==
Sunny South is located at 31.96487°N 87.64000°W and has an elevation of 164 feet (50 m).
