= Excel, Alabama =

- Town
- Location of Excel in Monroe County, Alabama.
- Coordinates: 31°25′35″N 87°20′36″W
- Country: United States
- State: Alabama
- County: Monroe

Area
  - Total: 1.65 sq mi (4.27 km^{2})
  - Land: 1.64 sq mi (4.26 km^{2})
  - Water: 0 sq mi (0.00 km^{2})
- Elevation: 407 ft (124 m)

Population (2020)
  - Total: 557
  - Density: 338.3/sq mi (130.61/km^{2})
- Time zone: UTC-6 (Central (CST))
  - Summer (DST): UTC-5 (CDT)
- ZIP code: 36439
- Area code: 251
- FIPS code: 01-24880
- GNIS feature ID: 2406476

Excel is a town in Monroe County, Alabama, United States. At the 2020 census, the population was 557. The current mayor is Jenny Countryman.

Excel incorporated in February 1948.

== History ==
The first settlers arrived in Excel around 1875. The town was named Excel because of the excellent agricultural land there. Around the turn of the century, Excel was connected by rail, allowing for economic expansion through the shipping of lumber and farm products. The rail line ceased operation in 1935, and Excel's growth slowed by 1937.

== Geography ==
According to the U.S. Census Bureau, the town has a total area of 1.6 square miles (4.1 km^{2}), all land.

== Demographics ==
Historical population
Census	Pop.	Note	%±
1950	316		—
1960	313		−0.9%
1970	422		34.8%
1980	385		−8.8%
1990	571		48.3%
2000	582		1.9%
2010	723		24.2%
2020	557		−23.0%
U.S. Decennial Census; 2013 Estimate

As of the census of 2010, there were 723 people, 270 households, and 205 families residing in the town. The population density was 425.3 inhabitants per square mile (164.2/km^{2}). There were 295 housing units at an average density of 173.5 per square mile (67.0/km^{2}). The racial makeup of the town was 91.1% White, 5.0% Black or African American, 1.4% Native American, 0.1% some other race, and 2.4% from two or more races. 0.7% of the population were Hispanic or Latino of any race.

There were 270 households, out of which 41.1% had children under the age of 18 living with them, 59.6% were headed by married couples living together, 12.2% had a female householder with no husband present, and 24.1% were non-families. 21.5% of all households were made up of individuals, and 10.4% were someone living alone who was 65 years of age or older. The average household size was 2.68, and the average family size was 3.11.

In the town, the population was spread out, with 28.5% under the age of 18, 6.8% from 18 to 24, 30.0% from 25 to 44, 20.4% from 45 to 64, and 14.4% who were 65 years of age or older. The median age was 32.9 years. For every 100 females, there were 91.8 males. For every 100 females age 18 and over, there were 91.5 males.

For the period 2007–2011, the estimated median annual income for a household in the town was $34,667, and the median income for a family was $39,167. Male full-time workers had a median income of $40,000 versus $36,250 for females. The per capita income for the town was $17,863. About 10.7% of families and 12.5% of the population were below the poverty line, including 20.0% of those under age 18 and 13.6% of those age 65 or over.

== Notable people ==
Excel is the birthplace of former University of Alabama and Dallas Cowboys linebacker Lee Roy Jordan and Jacob Burgess.
