= Wilcox County, Alabama =

County in Alabama, United States

- County
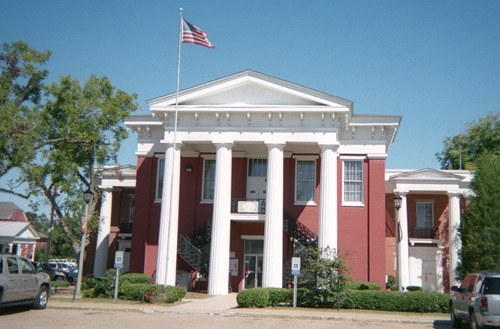
- Wilcox County Courthouse in Camden, Alabama

- Seal

- Location within the U.S. state of Alabama
- Coordinates: 31°59′06″N 87°18′39″W
- Country: United States
- State: Alabama
- Founded: December 13, 1819
- Named for: Joseph M. Wilcox
- Seat: Camden
- Largest city: Camden

Area
  - Total: 907 sq mi (2,350 km^{2})
  - Land: 888 sq mi (2,300 km^{2})
  - Water: 19 sq mi (49 km^{2}) 2.1%

Population (2020)
  - Total: 10,600
  - Estimate (2025): 9,666 ▼
  - Density: 11.9/sq mi (4.61/km^{2})
- Time zone: UTC−6 (Central)
  - Summer (DST): UTC−5 (CDT)
- Congressional district: 7th
- County Number 66 on Alabama Licence Plates

Wilcox County is a county of the U.S. state of Alabama. As of the 2020 census, the population was 10,600. Its county seat is Camden.

== History ==
Wilcox County was established on December 13, 1819. The county was named after Joseph M. Wilcox, a United States Army lieutenant who was killed in Alabama during the Creek War.

== Geography ==
According to the United States Census Bureau, the county has a total area of 907 square miles (2,350 km^{2}), of which 888 square miles (2,300 km^{2}) is land and 19 square miles (49 km^{2}) (2.1%) is water.

=== Major highways ===
- State Route 5
- State Route 10
- State Route 21
- State Route 25
- State Route 28
- State Route 41
- State Route 89
- State Route 162
- State Route 164
- State Route 221
- State Route 265

=== Adjacent counties ===
- Dallas County (northeast)
- Lowndes County (east-northeast)
- Butler County (east-southeast)
- Monroe County (south)
- Clarke County (southwest)
- Marengo County (northwest)

== Demographics ==
Historical population
Census	Pop.	Note	%±
1820	2,917		—
1830	9,548		227.3%
1840	15,278		60.0%
1850	17,352		13.6%
1860	24,618		41.9%
1870	28,377		15.3%
1880	31,828		12.2%
1890	30,816		−3.2%
1900	35,631		15.6%
1910	33,810		−5.1%
1920	31,080		−8.1%
1930	24,880		−19.9%
1940	26,279		5.6%
1950	23,476		−10.7%
1960	18,739		−20.2%
1970	16,303		−13.0%
1980	14,755		−9.5%
1990	13,568		−8.0%
2000	13,183		−2.8%
2010	11,670		−11.5%
2020	10,600		−9.2%
2025 (est.)	9,666	▼	−8.8%
U.S. Decennial Census; 1790–1960 1900–1990; 1990–2000 2010–2020

=== 2020 census ===
As of the 2020 census, the county had a population of 10,600. The median age was 43.8 years. 22.1% of residents were under the age of 18 and 20.8% of residents were 65 years of age or older. For every 100 females there were 93.9 males, and for every 100 females age 18 and over there were 91.3 males age 18 and over.

The racial makeup of the county was 27.2% White, 70.6% Black or African American, 0.1% American Indian and Alaska Native, 0.1% Asian, 0.1% Native Hawaiian and Pacific Islander, 0.3% from some other race, and 1.7% from two or more races. Hispanic or Latino residents of any race comprised 1.1% of the population.

0.0% of residents lived in urban areas, while 100.0% lived in rural areas.

There were 4,316 households in the county, of which 29.1% had children under the age of 18 living with them and 40.7% had a female householder with no spouse or partner present. About 32.7% of all households were made up of individuals and 15.0% had someone living alone who was 65 years of age or older.

There were 5,261 housing units, of which 18.0% were vacant. Among occupied housing units, 77.2% were owner-occupied and 22.8% were renter-occupied. The homeowner vacancy rate was 1.7% and the rental vacancy rate was 5.8%.

=== Racial and ethnic composition ===
Wilcox County, Alabama – Racial and ethnic composition Note: the US Census treats Hispanic/Latino as an ethnic category. This table excludes Latinos from the racial categories and assigns them to a separate category. Hispanics/Latinos may be of any race.
Race / Ethnicity (NH = Non-Hispanic)	Pop 2000	Pop 2010	Pop 2020	% 2000	% 2010	% 2020
White alone (NH)	3,611	3,110	2,866	27.39%	26.65%	27.04%
Black or African American alone (NH)	9,423	8,420	7,425	71.48%	72.15%	70.05%
Native American or Alaska Native alone (NH)	19	14	11	0.14%	0.12%	0.10%
Asian alone (NH)	8	4	7	0.06%	0.03%	0.07%
Pacific Islander alone (NH)	2	1	5	0.02%	0.01%	0.05%
Other race alone (NH)	0	2	16	0.00%	0.02%	0.15%
Mixed race or Multiracial (NH)	23	47	158	0.17%	0.40%	1.49%
Hispanic or Latino (any race)	97	72	112	0.74%	0.62%	1.06%
Total	13,183	11,670	10,600	100.00%	100.00%	100.00%

=== 2010 census ===
As of the 2010 United States census, there were 11,670 people living in the county. 72.5% were Black or African American, 26.8% White, 0.1% Native American, 0.1% of some other race and 0.4% of two or more races. 0.6% were Hispanic or Latino (of any race).

=== 2000 census ===
As of the census of 2000, there were 13,183 people, 4,776 households, and 3,376 families living in the county. The population density was 15 people per square mile (5.8 people/km^{2}). There were 6,183 housing units at an average density of 7 units per square mile (2.7 units/km^{2}). The racial makeup of the county was 71.90% Black or African American, 27.51% White, 0.14% Native American, 0.13% Asian, 0.02% Pacific Islander, 0.11% from other races, and 0.19% from two or more races. Nearly 0.74% of the population were Hispanic or Latino of any race.

There were 4,776 households, out of which 36.00% had children under the age of 18 living with them, 39.80% were married couples living together, 26.50% had a female householder with no husband present, and 29.30% were non-families. Nearly 27.50% of all households were made up of individuals, and 11.90% had someone living alone who was 65 years of age or older. The average household size was 2.70, and the average family size was 3.31.

In the county, the population was spread out, with 30.70% under the age of 18, 9.10% from 18 to 24, 25.50% from 25 to 44, 21.00% from 45 to 64, and 13.70% who were 65 years of age or older. The median age was 34 years. For every 100 females, there were 87.20 males. For every 100 females age 18 and over, there were 81.00 males.

The median income for a household in the county was $16,646, and the median income for a family was $22,200. Males had a median income of $26,216 versus $17,274 for females. The per capita income for the county was $10,903. About 36.10% of families and 39.90% of the population were below the poverty line, including 48.40% of those under age 18 and 32.10% of those age 65 or over.

== Government ==
Wilcox County leans heavily towards the Democratic Party. The only Republican to carry the county since 1900 has been Barry Goldwater in 1964 – when little to none of the county's black majority had voted for over seven decades and opposition by the voting white minority to Civil Rights meant that national Democrat Lyndon Johnson was not allowed on the ballot. Even after the Voting Rights Act of 1965, black registration was so slow that segregationist George Wallace comfortably carried the county in 1968, but since then the Democratic presidential candidate has carried Wilcox in every election. It was one of only six Wallace counties (Note: The others were the fellow Alabama counties of Bullock and Lowndes with similarly delayed black registration after 1965, and the white majority, historically secessionist Middle Tennessee trio of Houston County, Perry County and Stewart County.) to vote for George McGovern against Richard Nixon's 3,000-plus-county landslide of 1972.

United States presidential election results for Wilcox County, Alabama
Year	Republican		Democratic		Third party(ies)	
Year	No.	%	No.	%	No.	%
1824	79	29.15%	192	70.85%	0	0.00%
1828	95	14.03%	582	85.97%	0	0.00%
1832	0	0.00%	642	100.00%	0	0.00%
1836	607	71.50%	242	28.50%	0	0.00%
1840	778	64.09%	436	35.91%	0	0.00%
1844	585	48.19%	629	51.81%	0	0.00%
1848	639	57.16%	479	42.84%	0	0.00%
1852	286	34.42%	398	47.89%	147	17.69%
1856	0	0.00%	813	64.58%	446	35.42%
1860	0	0.00%	113	8.69%	1,188	91.31%
1868	3,396	69.59%	1,484	30.41%	0	0.00%
1872	3,958	75.77%	1,266	24.23%	0	0.00%
1876	3,599	70.72%	1,490	29.28%	0	0.00%
1880	1,264	40.46%	1,860	59.54%	0	0.00%
1884	1,541	38.82%	2,429	61.18%	0	0.00%
1888	607	11.20%	4,811	88.80%	0	0.00%
1892	215	3.96%	4,687	86.25%	532	9.79%
1896	45	1.48%	2,956	96.95%	48	1.57%
1900	30	1.44%	2,031	97.46%	23	1.10%
1904	2	0.22%	912	98.92%	8	0.87%
1908	2	0.19%	1,027	99.81%	0	0.00%
1912	7	0.78%	878	97.77%	13	1.45%
1916	1	0.12%	866	99.88%	0	0.00%
1920	2	0.18%	1,099	99.73%	1	0.09%
1924	6	0.63%	938	97.81%	15	1.56%
1928	266	21.35%	979	78.57%	1	0.08%
1932	23	1.67%	1,358	98.33%	0	0.00%
1936	11	0.80%	1,365	99.13%	1	0.07%
1940	20	1.29%	1,534	98.71%	0	0.00%
1944	30	2.42%	1,209	97.42%	2	0.16%
1948	14	1.19%	0	0.00%	1,162	98.81%
1952	725	42.30%	988	57.64%	1	0.06%
1956	499	33.85%	778	52.78%	197	13.36%
1960	513	36.00%	905	63.51%	7	0.49%
1964	1,789	91.93%	0	0.00%	157	8.07%
1968	237	5.34%	1,658	37.38%	2,540	57.27%
1972	2,641	44.42%	3,254	54.74%	50	0.84%
1976	1,824	32.78%	3,723	66.90%	18	0.32%
1980	2,280	31.40%	4,951	68.19%	30	0.41%
1984	2,337	38.81%	3,663	60.83%	22	0.37%
1988	1,739	33.98%	3,369	65.83%	10	0.20%
1992	1,671	31.50%	3,439	64.84%	194	3.66%
1996	1,454	30.00%	3,303	68.15%	90	1.86%
2000	1,661	32.40%	3,444	67.19%	21	0.41%
2004	1,834	32.28%	3,838	67.55%	10	0.18%
2008	1,868	28.77%	4,612	71.02%	14	0.22%
2012	1,679	25.61%	4,868	74.26%	8	0.12%
2016	1,742	28.45%	4,339	70.86%	42	0.69%
2020	1,833	31.05%	4,048	68.58%	22	0.37%
2024	1,793	34.07%	3,449	65.53%	21	0.40%

United States Senate election results for Wilcox County, Alabama2
Year	Republican		Democratic		Third party(ies)	
Year	No.	%	No.	%	No.	%
2020	1,779	30.26%	4,095	69.65%	5	0.09%

United States Senate election results for Wilcox County, Alabama3
Year	Republican		Democratic		Third party(ies)	
Year	No.	%	No.	%	No.	%
2022	1,329	34.86%	2,446	64.17%	37	0.97%

Alabama Gubernatorial election results for Washington County
Year	Republican		Democratic		Third party(ies)	
Year	No.	%	No.	%	No.	%
2022	1,371	35.13%	2,489	63.77%	43	1.10%

== Religion ==
According to the Association of Religion Data Archives at Pennsylvania State University, religious affiliation in Wilcox County in 2010 was as follows:

- African Methodist Episcopal Church (2443 adherents)
- Southern Baptist Convention (2177)
- Nondenominational Protestant (477)
- The United Methodist Church (463)
- Pentecostalism (320)
- Lutheran Church–Missouri Synod (262)
- Christian Methodist Episcopal Church (251)
- Churches of Christ (206)

== Education ==
All public schools in the county are operated by the Wilcox County School District, which covers the entire county. The schools include: and Camden School of Arts and Technology and Wilcox Central Academy. The community is also served by one private school, Wilcox Academy, founded in 1970 as a segregation academy. The public schools are effectively all-Black.

== Economy ==
Major industries in the county include a paper mill operated by International Paper, based in Memphis, Tennessee, on the Alabama River near Pine Hill that employs roughly 400 people, and a copper tubing plant owned by Golden Dragon Copper Group of Xinxiang, China in Sunny South that opened in 2014; it employs approximately 300.

== Communities ==
=== City ===
- Camden (county seat)

=== Towns ===
- Oak Hill
- Pine Apple
- Pine Hill
- Yellow Bluff

=== Census-designated places ===
- Boykin
- Catherine

=== Unincorporated communities ===
- Ackerville
- Alberta
- Anne Manie
- Arlington
- Bethel
- Canton Bend
- Coy
- Fatama
- Furman
- Gastonburg
- Gee's Bend
- Kimbrough
- Lamison
- Lower Peach Tree
- McWilliams
- Millers Ferry
- Pebble Hill
- Prairie
- Rockwest
- Rosebud
- Snow Hill
- Sunny South

=== Ghost towns ===
- Prairie Bluff
- Ruthven

== Places of interest ==
Wilcox County is home to Roland Cooper State Park, Lake Dannelly, and Bridgeport Beach.

== Notable people ==
- William Q. Atwood, former slave who became a lumber baron based in Saginaw, Michigan
- Judy L. Bonner, 28th President of The University of Alabama
- Fred Cone, former running back in the NFL for the Green Bay Packers and Dallas Cowboys
- James Crawford (basketball), former professional basketball player who played in the Australian National Basketball League
- Laurance L. Cross, Presbyterian minister and Mayor of Berkeley, California
- Marie Foster, leader in the U.S. Civil Rights Movement
- Kenneth R. Giddens, Broadcaster and Voice of America executive
- John Cooper Godbold, United States Circuit Judge of the United States Court of Appeals for the Eleventh Circuit and the United States Court of Appeals for the Fifth Circuit
- Kay Ivey, 54th governor of Alabama
- Philemon T. Herbert, former U.S. Representative from California
- Bill Lee (musician), American musician
- Noah Purifoy, visual artist and sculptor
- Benjamin M. Miller, 39th governor of Alabama
- Lucy Mingo, American quilt maker and member of the Gee's Bend Collective
- Estella Payton, co-star on the Woman's World cooking show that aired on WKRG-TV in Mobile, Alabama
- Joseph Smitherman, mayor of Selma, Alabama
- William J. Vaughn, American university professor, school principal, librarian and book collector
- Rosa Young, Lutheran educator from Rosebud

== See also ==
- National Register of Historic Places listings in Wilcox County, Alabama
- Properties on the Alabama Register of Landmarks and Heritage in Wilcox County, Alabama
- Rufus Randolph Rhodes
