= Dixonville, Alabama =

Unincorporated community in Alabama, United States

- Unincorporated community
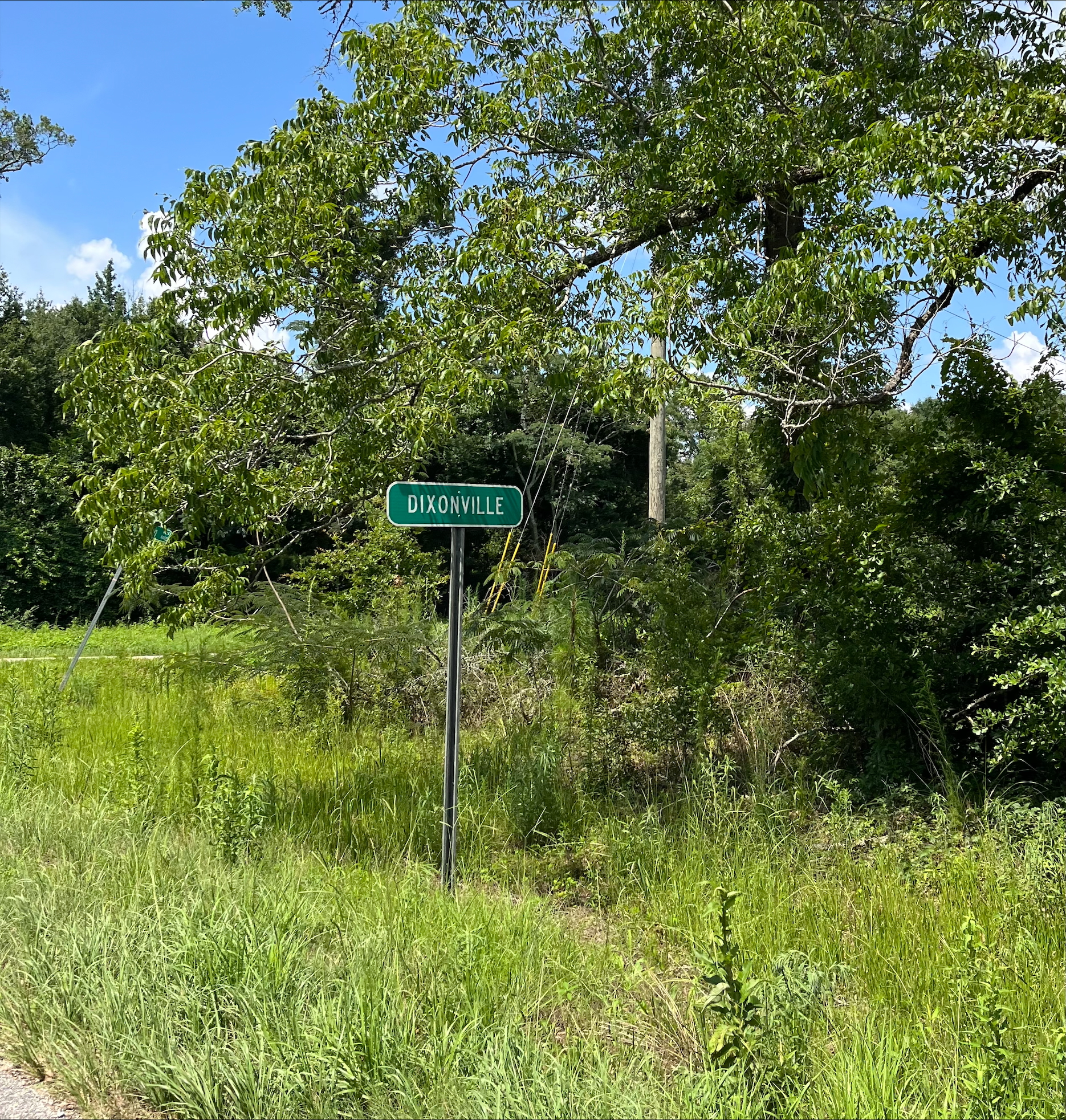
- Dixonville sign

- Location within Alabama Location within the United States
- Coordinates: 31°00′01″N 87°02′10″W
- Country: United States
- State: Alabama
- County: Escambia
- Elevation: 279 ft (85 m)
- Time zone: UTC-6 (Central (CST))
  - Summer (DST): UTC-5 (CDT)
- Area code: 251
- GNIS feature ID: 117321

Dixonville is an unincorporated community in Escambia County, Alabama, United States, on the Florida border. The community name continues south of the border as Dixonville, Florida.
