= Wilcox Central High School =

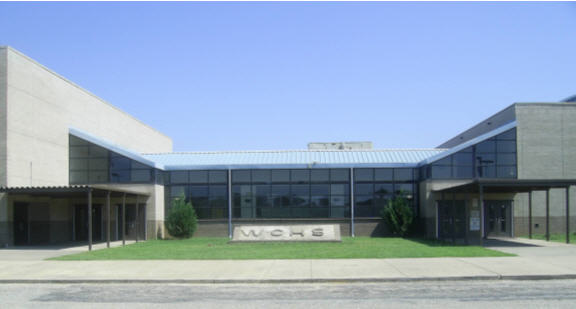
- The main entrance to Wilcox Central High School

Location
- 1310 Threadgill Rd; Camden, Alabama 36726; United States; 32°0′26″N 87°19′21″W

Information
- Type: Public school
- School district: Wilcox County School District
- CEEB code: 010570
- NCES School ID: 010351001780
- Teaching staff: 19.24 (on FTE basis)
- Grades: 9-12
- Enrollment: 352 (2023-2024)
- Student to teacher ratio: 18.30
- Colors: Red, white, and blue
- Mascot: Jaguar
- Website: www.wilcox.k12.al.us/o/wchs

Wilcox Central High School (WCHS or Wilcox), is a public high school in Camden, Alabama. Part of the Wilcox County School District, it serves as the only public high school in Wilcox County. More than 600 students were enrolled for the 2010–2011 school year. The student body is predominantly African American. Wilcox Academy, a segregation academy in Camden accounts for the majority of the white students of Wilcox County. Wilcox Central open doors with the first graduating class in 1990. Converting Wilcox County High, PineHill High & W. J. Jones High School. The Wilcox Central Alumni nicknamed the School "the Jungle" because of the Jaguar Mascot.

== Athletics ==
Jaguars are the school.mascot and sports include: varsity/junior varsity girls and boys basketball, varsity boys baseball, varsity girls softball, and varsity boys football. The Wilcox-Central varsity boys basketball has won 2 past 5A State Championships in 2000 and 2003. They also have a state title in 1985 and one from the early years of the 20 and 30s. In the 2006-07 year Wilcox lost to John Carroll 49–44 in State Regional semifinals. Then in 2007-08 lost to Parker High School also in the State Regional semifinals in Montgomery.

== Clubs ==
School clubs include AFJROTC, BETA Club, Drama Club, Future Business Leaders of America, Future Farmers of America, HOSA, Library/Book Club, Science Club, SGA, VICA.

== Alumni ==
- Antoine Pettway - Kennesaw State basketball head coach and former professional basketball player
