= Wilcox County School District (Alabama) =

School district in Alabama

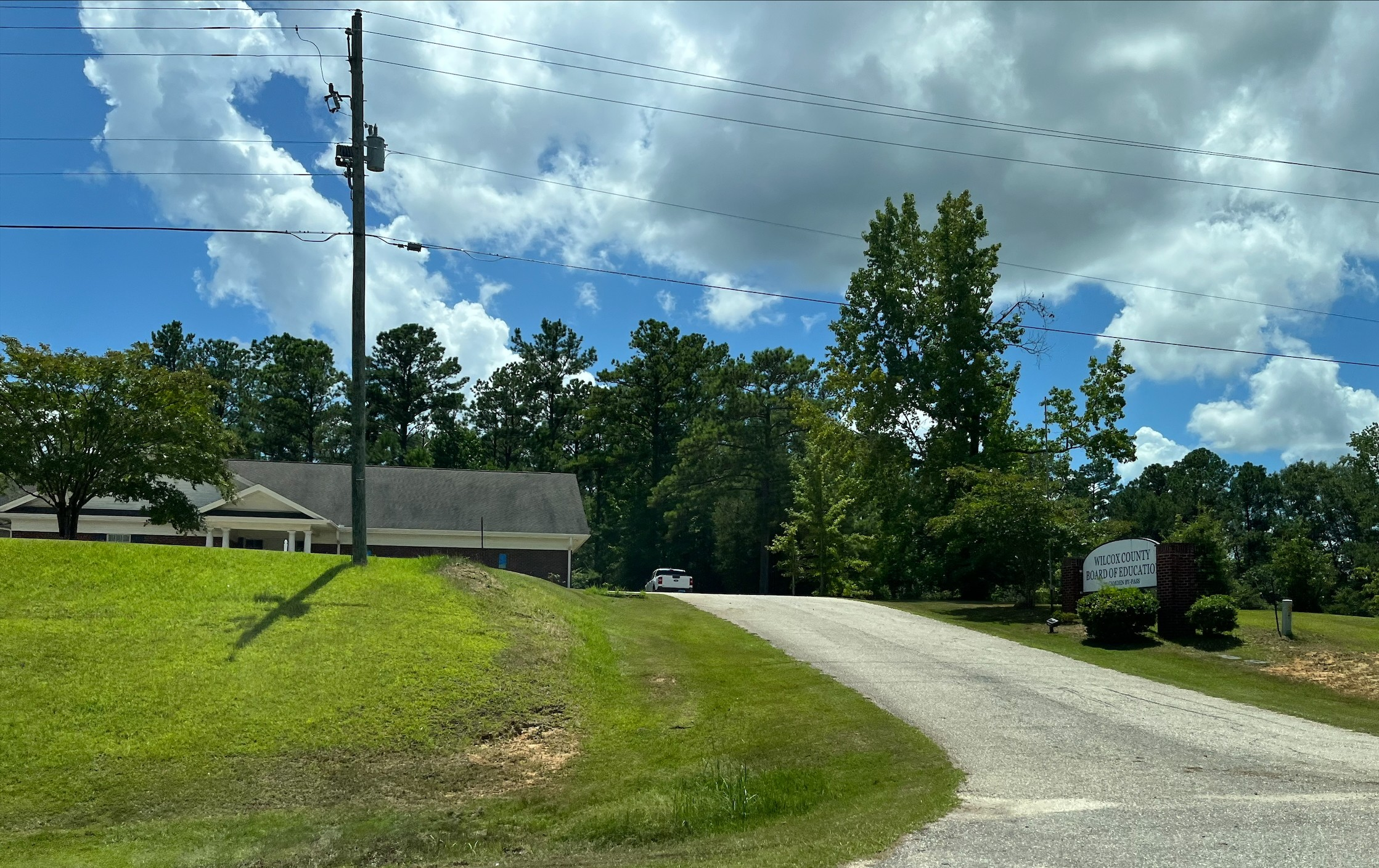
- Wilcox County Board of Education

Address
- 75 Camden Bypass Camden, Alabama; United States
- Coordinates: 32.00296°N 87.28914°W

District information
- Type: Public
- Grades: K–12
- Superintendent: André P. Saulsberry
- School board: Wilcox County Board of Education
- Accreditation: Southern Association of Colleges and Schools
- NCES District ID: 0103510

Students and staff
- Students: 1,991
- Teachers: 129.00 (on FTE basis)
- Staff: 284.00 (on FTE basis)
- Student–teacher ratio: 15.43

Other information
- Website: www.wilcox.k12.al.us

The Wilcox County School District is the public school system for Wilcox County, Alabama, covering the entire county. It operates three elementary schools, two secondary schools and an alternative school. The system educates roughly 2000 students and employs more than 280.

The district is governed by the Wilcox County Board of Education. There are six board members, elected for a term of four years. A superintendent, hired by the board, and support staff oversee the system on a daily basis. The current superintendent is André P. Saulsberry.

== Segregation ==
The 2012 demographic profile of Wilcox County showed the population as 27.4% white and 71.8% black. The local schools are effectively racially segregated with the vast majority of White students attending private schools.

	Location	Number of students	% Black students	% Free/reduced Lunch*	Note
ABC Elementary School	Alberta	135-175	100%	76%	
F.S. Ervin Elementary School	Pine Hill	328	99%	70.9%	
J.E. Hobbs Elementary School	Camden	520	100%	67.6%	
Camden School of Arts and Technology	Camden	254	100%	99%	Middle school
Wilcox Central High School	Camden	540	100%	99%	

- The percentage of students allowed a free school lunch is commonly used as a proxy for poverty.

== Private schools in the county ==
	Location	Number of students	% Black students	% Free/reduced Lunch*	Note
Wilcox Academy	Camden	250	nil.	Unknown	

== Failing schools ==
Statewide testing ranks the schools in Alabama. Those in the bottom six percent are listed as "failing." As of early 2018, both Wilcox Central High School and Camden School Of Arts & Technology were included in this category.
