= Wilcox Academy =

Segregation academy in Alabama

- Wilcox Academy captured in the setting sun

Location
- 340 Ashley Street; Camden, Wilcox County, Alabama 36726; United States; 32°00′12″N 87°18′22″W

Information
- School type: Private
- Established: 1970 (56 years ago)
- CEEB code: 010572
- NCES School ID: 01925943
- Principal: Chris Burford
- Faculty: 19
- Grades: K-12
- Enrollment: 247
- Student to teacher ratio: 13:1 (2019-20)
- Campus type: Rural
- Colors: Blue and white
- Mascot: Wildcats
- Website: www.wilcoxacademy.com

Wilcox Academy is an independent school in Camden, Alabama. It is accredited by the Alabama Independent School Association and the Southern Association of Colleges and Schools. The school has been described as a segregation academy.

== History ==
Prior to 1970, public education in Wilcox County was primarily populated by White students, while black students were educated mostly at private schools run by Presbyterian organizations, including Camden Academy. When the county's public schools were forced to integrate in 1970, Wilcox Academy was one of three segregation academies that were founded in response, along with Catherine Academy and Stokes Academy.

The Wilcox Educational Foundation held a meeting in February 1970 about opening a school, which they initially named Camden Private School. Local businesses had already purchased 400 desks. Within a month, 119 families had joined the foundation, secured a 16 acre plot, and secured sponsors for a football team. The first year produced a graduating class of 13 (all white) students. The school's enrollment boomed in the 1970s as white parents withdrew their children from public schools. By 1972, the school system was reported to once again be completely segregated, with the public schools all Black, and all Whites attending private schools, including Wilcox Academy. That same year, the IRS revoked Wilcox Educational Foundation's tax deductibility because the school had declined to adopt racially non-discriminatory admissions policies. In 1973 there were allegations that the County school board had tried to discourage White students from attending public schools and to attend Wilcox Academy instead, and that public school property had been transferred to Wilcox Academy. While the superintendent denied the charges, others admitted that some property had been taken and later returned. Other charges included that the Wilcox County School Board was deliberately trying to destroy the public schools, in order to redirect all White children to the academy, including such actions as haphazard teacher assignment and designing the school transportation system to disrupt schools.

By the early 2000s, some White parents were beginning to send their children to public schools because they were dissatisfied with Wilcox Academy's ability to provide quality academic programs with shrinking enrollment. The Wilcox Academy chairman declined comment on academic performance comparisons with public schools, stating that he "see[s] no advantage for us revealing any information for public consumption." As of 2022, it is the only school remaining of the segregation academies formed in 1970.

== Demographics ==
As of 1990, no black students had ever attended the school. In 2015–16, no black students attend.

Of 278 non-prekindergarten students enrolled in the 2011–2012 school year, 276 were white. The 2012 demographic profile of Wilcox County, showed the population as 27.4% white and 71.8% black. As of the 2019-2020 school year, there were 247 students, of whom 243 were White, 1 Asian, 2 Black, and 1 Hispanic.

== Deer and Turkey Hunts ==
Wilcox Academy has a six hundred plus member organization which holds two benefit hunts each year. The Turkey Hunt, normally held the end of March or early April, began in 1971 and was followed by the Gun Deer Hunt in 1985, which is held in early January.

== Notable alumni ==
- Mike Stewart, novelist.
