= Pine Hill, Alabama =

- Town
- Location of Pine Hill in Wilcox County, Alabama.
- Coordinates: 31°59′09″N 87°36′20″W
- Country: United States
- State: Alabama
- County: Wilcox

Government
  - Mayor: Robert Green

Area
  - Total: 3.82 sq mi (9.89 km^{2})
  - Land: 3.82 sq mi (9.89 km^{2})
  - Water: 0 sq mi (0.00 km^{2})
- Elevation: 121 ft (37 m)

Population (2020)
  - Total: 758
  - Density: 198.6/sq mi (76.68/km^{2})
- Time zone: UTC-6 (Central (CST))
  - Summer (DST): UTC-5 (CDT)
- ZIP code: 36769
- Area code: 334
- FIPS code: 01-60240
- GNIS feature ID: 2407115

Pine Hill is a town in western Wilcox County, Alabama, United States. It incorporated in 1895. Per the 2020 census, the population was 758.

== Geography ==
According to the U.S. Census Bureau, the town has a total area of 3.9 square miles (10 km^{2}), all land.

== Demographics ==
Historical population
Census	Pop.	Note	%±
1910	470		—
1920	375		−20.2%
1930	433		15.5%
1940	418		−3.5%
1950	408		−2.4%
1960	367		−10.0%
1970	697		89.9%
1980	510		−26.8%
1990	481		−5.7%
2000	966		100.8%
2010	975		0.9%
2020	758		−22.3%
U.S. Decennial Census; 2010 2020

=== 2020 census ===
Pine Hill town, Alabama – Racial and ethnic composition Note: the US Census treats Hispanic/Latino as an ethnic category. This table excludes Latinos from the racial categories and assigns them to a separate category. Hispanics/Latinos may be of any race.
Race / Ethnicity (NH = Non-Hispanic)	Pop 2010	Pop 2020	% 2010	% 2020
White alone (NH)	442	321	45.33%	42.35%
Black or African American alone (NH)	518	406	53.13%	53.56%
Native American or Alaska Native alone (NH)	4	5	0.41%	0.66%
Asian alone (NH)	1	0	0.10%	0.00%
Pacific Islander alone (NH)	0	0	0.00%	0.00%
Some Other Race alone (NH)	1	0	0.10%	0.00%
Mixed Race or Multi-Racial (NH)	2	20	0.21%	2.64%
Hispanic or Latino (any race)	7	6	0.72%	0.79%
Total	975	758	100.00%	100.00%

=== 2000 Census ===
At the 2000 census there were 966 people, 391 households, and 272 families in the town. The population density was 249.2 inhabitants per square mile (96.2/km^{2}). There were 443 housing units at an average density of 114.3 per square mile (44.1/km^{2}). The racial makeup of the town was 49.90% Black or African American, 48.96% White, 0.72% Native American, 0.10% Asian, and 0.31% from two or more races. 0.10% of the population were Hispanic or Latino of any race. Of the 391 households 36.6% had children under the age of 18 living with them, 41.4% were married couples living together, 25.8% had a female householder with no husband present, and 30.2% were non-families. 27.9% of households were one person and 11.8% were one person aged 65 or older. The average household size was 2.47 and the average family size was 3.01.

The age distribution was 30.8% under the age of 18, 9.0% from 18 to 24, 24.1% from 25 to 44, 22.7% from 45 to 64, and 13.4% 65 or older. The median age was 34 years. For every 100 females, there were 87.9 males. For every 100 females age 18 and over, there were 78.6 males.

The median household income was $23,375 and the median family income was $32,813. Males had a median income of $32,368 versus $17,396 for females. The per capita income for the town was $15,845. About 28.3% of families and 30.9% of the population were below the poverty line, including 49.5% of those under age 18 and 21.0% of those age 65 or over.

== Education ==
The sole school district in the county is the Wilcox County School District. The sole comprehensive high school of the district is Wilcox Central High School.

== Notable residents ==
- George Oliver Miller who served as Speaker of the Alabama House of Representatives in 1942 and 1943 was born in Pine Hill
