= Camden, Alabama =

City in and county seat of Wilcox County, Alabama

Camden
- City
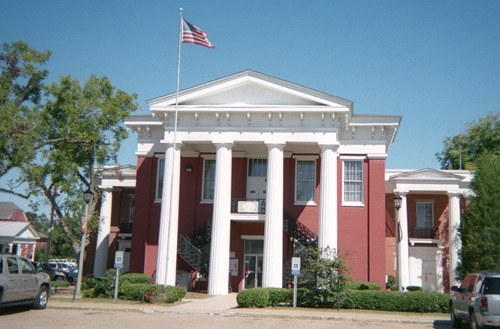
- Wilcox County Courthouse in Camden, completed in 1857.

- Logo

- Location of Camden in Wilcox County, Alabama.
- Coordinates: 31°59′39″N 87°17′52″W
- Country: United States
- State: Alabama
- County: Wilcox
- Named for: Camden, South Carolina

Area
  - Total: 4.20 sq mi (10.87 km^{2})
  - Land: 4.19 sq mi (10.84 km^{2})
  - Water: 0.012 sq mi (0.03 km^{2})
- Elevation: 243 ft (74 m)

Population (2020)
  - Total: 1,927
  - Density: 460.6/sq mi (177.82/km^{2})
- Time zone: UTC-6 (Central (CST))
  - Summer (DST): UTC-5 (CDT)
- ZIP code: 36726
- Area code: 334
- FIPS code: 01-11512
- GNIS feature ID: 2403975
- Website: https://camdenalabama.org/

Camden is a city in and the county seat of Wilcox County, Alabama, United States. The population was 1,927 at the 2020 census, down from 2,020 in 2010.

== History ==
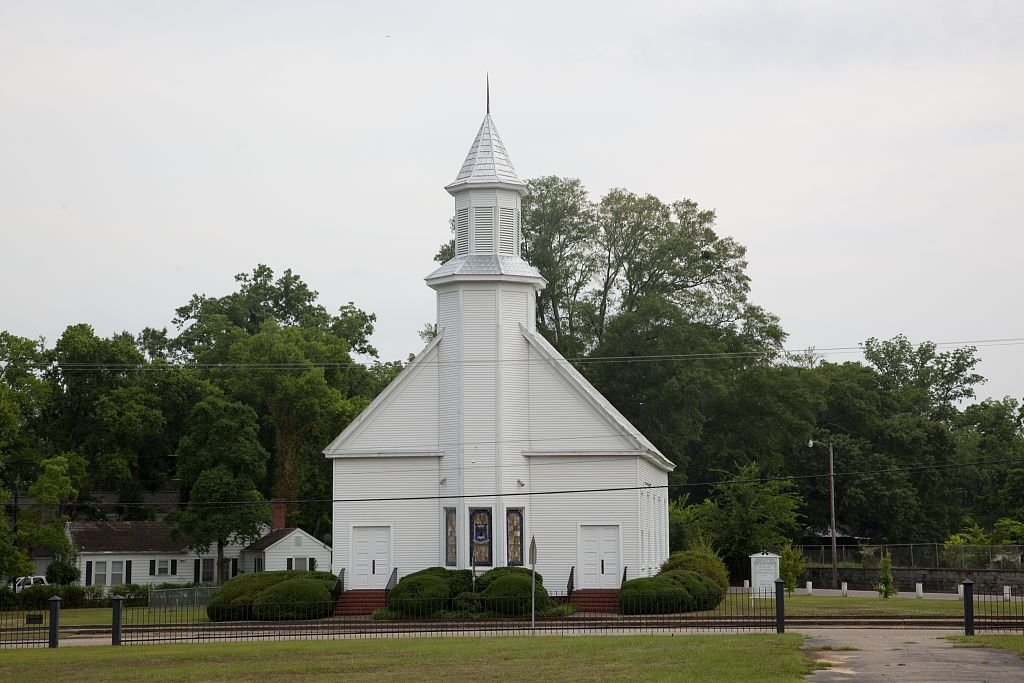
The Camden Associate Reformed Presbyterian Church, built in 1849

What is now Camden was established on property donated by Thomas Dunn from his plantation holdings in order to have a new town founded on the site in 1833 to serve as the county seat. Dunn's Federal style house, built in 1825, is the oldest documented house in the town. The first county seat was in the community of Canton Bend.

The county seat was moved in 1833 to Barboursville, later renamed Camden. It had been named Barboursville in honor of United States Congressman Philip P. Barbour of Virginia. Incorporated in 1841, Camden was renamed by local physician John D. Caldwell in honor of his hometown of Camden, South Carolina.

The area depended on cultivation of cotton as a commodity crop, which was worked by numerous African American slaves. The earliest documented industries in the town were a brickyard, sawmill, and window fabricator. The Camden Phenix was the town's earliest known newspaper. Townspeople founded a girls' school in 1844, the Wilcox Female Seminary and Female Institute, whose red-brick Greek-Revival style building was constructed from 1845 to 1850. In 1976 the former school was adapted to house the Wilcox County Historical Society.

The red-brick Greek-Revival style Wilcox County Courthouse, also listed on the National Register of Historic Places, was completed in 1857. It replaced an earlier wood-frame structure.

During the American Civil War, many in the community joined the Confederate cause. The county courthouse was ransacked by Union forces in 1865, but advance warning allowed county officials to remove the county records to a safe place (legend claims that they were buried in a coffin) prior to arrival of Union troops. Already devastated by the Civil War, Camden suffered fires during 1869 and 1870 that destroyed about two-thirds of the town. The town began to recover during the 1880s, with the first bank incorporated in 1894.

Camden benefited economically during the mid-20th century with the construction of a paper mill at Yellow Bluff and of the Millers Ferry Lock and Dam, a hydroelectric dam on the Alabama River near Millers Ferry. This created the William "Bill" Dannelly Reservoir, which has served as an important recreational resource.

== Geography ==
According to the U.S. Census Bureau, the town had an area of 4.2 square miles (11 km^{2}), of which 4.2 square miles (11 km^{2}) is land and 0.24% is water.

=== Climate ===
According to the Köppen climate classification, Camden has a humid subtropical climate (abbreviated Cfa).

Climate data for Camden, Alabama, 1991–2020 normals, extremes 1908–2001
Month	Jan	Feb	Mar	Apr	May	Jun	Jul	Aug	Sep	Oct	Nov	Dec	Year
Record high °F (°C)	88 (31)	85 (29)	89 (32)	94 (34)	99 (37)	104 (40)	106 (41)	107 (42)	102 (39)	99 (37)	87 (31)	82 (28)	107 (42)
Mean daily maximum °F (°C)	58.3 (14.6)	62.2 (16.8)	71.1 (21.7)	77.7 (25.4)	84.8 (29.3)	89.6 (32.0)	92.1 (33.4)	91.1 (32.8)	87.5 (30.8)	78.4 (25.8)	67.5 (19.7)	59.2 (15.1)	76.6 (24.8)
Daily mean °F (°C)	46.9 (8.3)	50.8 (10.4)	58.4 (14.7)	64.4 (18.0)	72.8 (22.7)	79.0 (26.1)	81.1 (27.3)	80.2 (26.8)	75.8 (24.3)	65.4 (18.6)	54.8 (12.7)	48.4 (9.1)	64.8 (18.3)
Mean daily minimum °F (°C)	35.5 (1.9)	39.3 (4.1)	45.8 (7.7)	51.0 (10.6)	60.8 (16.0)	68.3 (20.2)	70.0 (21.1)	69.3 (20.7)	64.2 (17.9)	52.4 (11.3)	42.2 (5.7)	37.5 (3.1)	53.0 (11.7)
Record low °F (°C)	0 (−18)	7 (−14)	15 (−9)	26 (−3)	35 (2)	42 (6)	52 (11)	52 (11)	36 (2)	23 (−5)	13 (−11)	4 (−16)	0 (−18)
Average precipitation inches (mm)	5.54 (141)	5.09 (129)	5.93 (151)	4.12 (105)	4.32 (110)	4.25 (108)	5.56 (141)	4.15 (105)	3.57 (91)	2.86 (73)	5.32 (135)	5.14 (131)	55.85 (1,420)
Average snowfall inches (cm)	0.1 (0.25)	trace	0.3 (0.76)	0.0 (0.0)	0.0 (0.0)	0.0 (0.0)	0.0 (0.0)	0.0 (0.0)	0.0 (0.0)	0.0 (0.0)	0.0 (0.0)	0.1 (0.25)	0.5 (1.26)
Average precipitation days (≥ 0.01 in)	10.7	10.0	9.3	9.0	8.8	10.5	11.7	9.6	8.1	6.2	8.3	9.6	111.8
Average snowy days (≥ 0.1 in)	0.1	0.0	0.0	0.0	0.0	0.0	0.0	0.0	0.0	0.0	0.0	0.1	0.2
Source 1: NOAA (precip/precip days, snow/snow days 1981–2010)
Source 2: XMACIS2

== Demographics ==
Historical population
Census	Pop.	Note	%±
1850	800		—
1880	590		—
1890	545		−7.6%
1900	478		−12.3%
1910	648		35.6%
1920	700		8.0%
1930	697		−0.4%
1940	909		30.4%
1950	931		2.4%
1960	1,121		20.4%
1970	1,742		55.4%
1980	2,406		38.1%
1990	2,414		0.3%
2000	2,257		−6.5%
2010	2,020		−10.5%
2020	1,927		−4.6%
U.S. Decennial Census; 2013 Estimate

=== Racial and ethnic composition ===
Camden town, Alabama – Racial and ethnic composition Note: the US Census treats Hispanic/Latino as an ethnic category. This table excludes Latinos from the racial categories and assigns them to a separate category. Hispanics/Latinos may be of any race. Race and ethnicity were not surveyed for populations under 2,500 in 1980 and under 1,000 in 1990.
Race / Ethnicity (NH = Non-Hispanic)	Pop 1990	Pop 2000	Pop 2010	Pop 2020	% 1990	% 2000	% 2010	% 2020
White alone (NH)	1,268	1,020	839	722	52.53%	45.19%	41.53%	37.47%
Black or African American alone (NH)	1,136	1,217	1,156	1,127	47.06%	53.92%	57.23%	58.48%
Native American or Alaska Native alone (NH)	2	2	2	0	0.08%	0.09%	0.10%	0.00%
Asian alone (NH)	3	0	0	6	0.12%	0.00%	0.00%	0.31%
Native Hawaiian or Pacific Islander alone (NH)	x	0	0	0	x	0.00%	0.00%	0.00%
Other race alone (NH)	5	0	1	5	0.21%	0.00%	0.05%	0.26%
Mixed race or Multiracial (NH)	x	6	8	34	x	0.27%	0.40%	1.76%
Hispanic or Latino (any race)	6	12	14	33	0.25%	0.53%	0.69%	1.71%
Total	2,414	2,257	2,020	1,927	100.00%	100.00%	100.00%	100.00%

=== 2020 census ===
As of the 2020 census, Camden had a population of 1,927 and 501 families residing in the city. The median age was 41.6 years. 22.7% of residents were under the age of 18 and 20.5% of residents were 65 years of age or older. For every 100 females there were 86.5 males, and for every 100 females age 18 and over there were 80.2 males age 18 and over.

There were 766 households in Camden, of which 32.2% had children under the age of 18 living in them. Of all households, 33.3% were married-couple households, 18.7% were households with a male householder and no spouse or partner present, and 44.6% were households with a female householder and no spouse or partner present. About 33.0% of all households were made up of individuals and 15.9% had someone living alone who was 65 years of age or older.

There were 885 housing units, of which 13.4% were vacant. The homeowner vacancy rate was 2.2% and the rental vacancy rate was 8.7%.

0.0% of residents lived in urban areas, while 100.0% lived in rural areas.

=== 2010 census ===
At the 2010 census there were 2,020 people, 790 households, and 540 families living in the town. The population density was 481.0 inhabitants per square mile (185.7/km^{2}). There were 927 housing units at an average density of 220.7 per square mile (85.2/km^{2}). The racial makeup of the town was 57.4% African American, 42.0% White, 0.1% Native American, 0.1% from other races, and 0.4% from two or more races. 0.7% of the population were Hispanic or Latino of any race. Of the 790 households 31.0% had children under the age of 18 living with them, 36.1% were married couples living together, 26.3% had a female householder with no husband present, and 31.6% were non-families. 29.9% of households were one person and 14.4% were one person aged 65 or older. The average household size was 2.47 and the average family size was 3.07.

The age distribution was 28.6% under the age of 18, 7.1% from 18 to 24, 21.0% from 25 to 44, 25.9% from 45 to 64, and 17.4% 65 or older. The median age was 37.7 years. For every 100 females, there were 78.6 males. For every 100 females age 18 and over, there were 80.3 males.

The median household income was $21,563 and the median family income was $37,031. Males had a median income of $60,250 versus $23,380 for females. The per capita income for the town was $15,978. About 27.0% of families and 31.6% of the population were below the poverty line, including 42.6% of those under age 18 and 15.6% of those age 65 or over.

=== 2000 census ===
At the 2000 census there were 2,257 people, 868 households, and 584 families living in the town. The population density was 533.7 inhabitants per square mile (206.1/km^{2}). There were 965 housing units at an average density of 228.2 per square mile (88.1/km^{2}). The racial makeup of the town was 54.23% African American, 45.28% White, 0.09% Native American, 0.09% from other races, and 0.31% from two or more races. 0.53% of the population were Hispanic or Latino of any race. Of the 868 households 35.9% had children under the age of 18 living with them, 37.6% were married couples living together, 27.0% had a female householder with no husband present, and 32.7% were non-families. 31.0% of households were one person and 16.0% were one person aged 65 or older. The average household size was 2.45 and the average family size was 3.09.

The age distribution was 29.1% under the age of 18, 8.6% from 18 to 24, 24.2% from 25 to 44, 19.8% from 45 to 64, and 18.3% 65 or older. The median age was 36 years. For every 100 females, there were 78.3 males. For every 100 females age 18 and over, there were 71.2 males.

The median household income was $25,750 and the median family income was $28,854. Males had a median income of $35,625 versus $20,735 for females. The per capita income for the town was $14,272. About 31.4% of families and 33.6% of the population were below the poverty line, including 43.3% of those under age 18 and 29.6% of those age 65 or over.

== Education ==
The sole school district in the county is the Wilcox County School District.

- Wilcox Central High School, a public high school

Private schools:

- Wilcox Academy, a private K-12 academy

== Notable people ==
- Henry Aaron – Hall of Fame Major League Baseball right fielder, born in Camden, raised in Mobile
- Johnny Baker – former American Football League linebacker and tight end
- Jo Bonner – former U.S. Representative who was reared in Camden
- Elizabeth Brown – contemporary composer and performer
- Hank Harris – former guard for the Washington Redskins
- Belle R. Harrison - poet and short story writer
- Kay Ivey – Current Governor of Alabama, former Alabama State Treasurer
- Tom Jenkins – Major League Baseball outfielder
- Elliott Jones – first head football coach for of Vanderbilt University
- Annie L. Key – former member of the Ohio Representative
- Ronnie McNeir – singer-songwriter
- James A. Merriman – physician and newspaper editor
- Benjamin Meek Miller – Alabama Governor
- Jimmy Newberry – pitcher in the Negro leagues and the Pacific League
- Adrian Pledger (born 1976) – basketball player
- J. De Forest Richards – former American football player and banker
- Jeff Sessions – U.S. Attorney General, Alabama Attorney General, U.S. Senator (school)
- Mathew C. Smith – U.S. Army brigadier general, born in Camden
- Palmer Williams Jr. – actor

== Transportation ==
Intercity bus service is provided by Greyhound Lines.
