= Alabama State Route 5 =

State highway in Alabama, United States

State Route 5

Route information
- Maintained by ALDOT
- Length: 197.775 mi (318.288 km)

Major junctions
- South end: US 43 in Thomasville
- SR 14 / SR 183 in Marion; US 82 near Centreville; I-20 / I-59 / US 11 in Woodstock and Birmingham; SR 69 / SR 118 in Jasper
- North end: US 278 / SR 13 / SR 74 in Natural Bridge

Location
- Country: United States
- State: Alabama
- Counties: Clark; Wilcox; Marengo; Dallas; Perry; Bibb; Tuscaloosa; Jefferson; Walker; Winston

Highway system
- Alabama State Highway System; Interstate; US; State
← SR 4	→ SR 6

State Route 5 (SR 5) is a 198-mile-long (319 km) south–north state highway in the western part of the U.S. state of Alabama. Prior to the renumbering of the highways of Alabama in 1957, it extended from Mobile north to the Tennessee state line and was one of the major routes between Mobile and Birmingham. It has since been shortened to about half of its former length, having been superseded by newer highways such as Interstate 65 (I-65).

== Route description ==
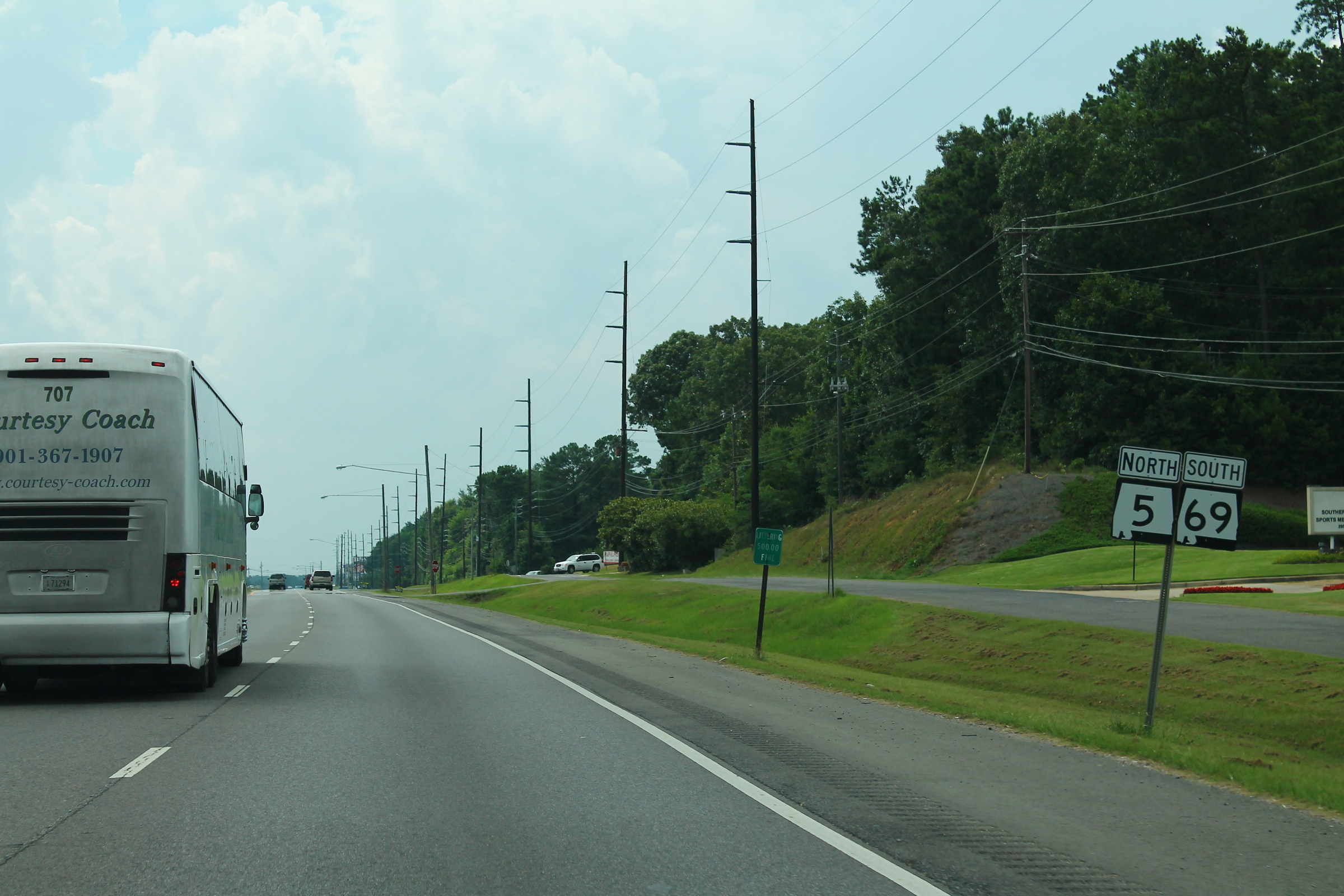
North along SR 5 in Jasper along its concurrency with southbound SR 69, July 2014

In a way, SR 5 is two separate highways. The first leg of its route begins at the present southern terminus of SR 5 at its intersection with U.S. Route 43 (US 43) at Thomasville. For the next 135 miles (217 km), it proceeds northeasterly towards Birmingham, passing through the rural areas of the Black Belt; much of this segment is a two-lane road. In northern Bibb County, SR 5 joins US 11, I-20, and I-59, and these continue their route to the northeast. SR 5 travels concurrently with US 11 for 30 miles (48 km) between Woodstock and Birmingham.

The second section of SR 5 begins near the historic Legion Field stadium in Birmingham, where US 11 and SR 5 intersect with US 78. At that point, the concurrency of US 11 and SR 5 ends, and the 13-mile-long (21 km) concurrency of US 78 and SR 5 begins. US 78 and SR 5 formerly traveled concurrently from Birmingham to Jasper, passing through the Birmingham suburbs of Forestdale, Adamsville, and Graysville. With the completion of much of I-22 in northwestern Alabama, US 78 and SR 5 now split at Graysville, with US 78 now being routed on I-22. At Jasper, SR 5 forks away from the former routing of US 78, continuing through the rural areas of Walker County and Winston County. The northern terminus of SR 5 is at its junction with US 278 and SR 13 at Natural Bridge.

== History ==
In the original numbering of state roads in the mid-1920s, the highway that would become SR 5 had several numbers. SR 6 was the highway from Mobile north via Thomasville to Selma. SR 35 split from SR 6 at Safford and ran northeast near Woodstock, where traffic could continue to Birmingham on SR 2 (US 11). SR 43 split from SR 8 (US 78) at Jasper, taking traffic from Montgomery via US 78 to Phil Campbell.

SR 43 also traveled southwest from Jasper to SR 33 at the village of Bankston, though the exact route had not been defined by 1927. From there, travelers could continue north on part of SR 5 to Florence, and SR 50 to the Tennessee state line, where the road became Tennessee State Route 6 towards Lawrenceburg and Nashville.

By late 1928, a large renumbering of highways had been carried out. The new SR 5 stretched from Mobile to Tennessee via Birmingham and Florence, and included several former routes: most of SR 6, all of SR 35, most of SR 43, part of SR 5, and all of SR 50. The remainders of SR 35 and SR 43 became parts of SR 22 and SR 18. The old SR 5 was split among several routes. The two halves of the new SR 5 were linked between somewhere near Woodstock and Jasper by a concurrency with SR 7 (US 11) and SR 4 (US 78) via Birmingham. US 43 was added to the route south of Thomasville and north of Phil Campbell in 1933 or 1934. In between those two, SR 5 used a shorter route, mainly SR 13.

Except for minor relocations and widenings, SR 5 remained the same until the 1950s. Around 1950, a new highway, running southeast from SR 5 at Haleyville to local roads at Natural Bridge, was added to the state highway system as SR 195.

Maintenance by the Alabama Highway Department was extended southeast from Natural Bridge to SR 5 near Jasper by 1957. In that year, in the renumbering of the state highways of Alabama, substantial changes were made to the route of SR 5. Both portions of it that had been concurrencies with US 43 – south of Thomasville and north of Phil Campbell – became SR 13, which essentially became the unsigned partner to US 43 across the state. SR 13 used a shorter highway between Bankston and Haleyville, joining SR 5 at Natural Bridge and making the north end of SR 5 an overlap with SR 13. US 43 has never been moved to this route.

In addition, SR 5 and SR 195 were swapped between Jasper and Haleyville, giving SR 5 a more direct route that had just been paved. This removed almost half of the original SR 5, leaving it a reflected C-shaped route, with both ends of connecting with US 43, and its eastmost point in Birmingham.

In 2020, the intersection of SR 5 and CR 58 in Brent was converted to a roundabout.

An urban legend claims that SR 5 near Lynn is haunted by the spirit of a teenage girl who was killed by a truck driver.

== Major intersections ==
County	Location	mi	km	Destinations	Notes
Clarke	Thomasville	0.00	0.00	US 43 (SR 13) – Grove Hill, Linden, Alabama Southern College Thomasville Campus	Southern terminus
Wilcox		5.710	9.189	SR 25 north – Thomaston	Southern terminus of SR 25
Wilcox	Pine Hill	11.02	17.73	SR 10 – Butler, Camden	
Wilcox	Kimbrough	14.05	22.61	SR 162 east – Camden	Western terminus of SR 162
Marengo	No major junctions				
Wilcox	Catherine	28.10	45.22	SR 28 – Thomaston, Camden	Interchange
Dallas		35.51	57.15	SR 66 west – Thomaston	Eastern terminus of SR 66
Dallas	Safford	36.77	59.18	SR 22 east – Selma	Western terminus of SR 22
Dallas		47.64	76.67	US 80 (SR 8) – Selma, Uniontown	Interchange
Perry		58.71	94.48	SR 183 south – Uniontown	Southern end of SR 183 concurrency
Perry	Marion	61.18	98.46	SR 289 north – Downtown Marion	Southern terminus of SR 289
Perry	Marion	62.94	101.29	SR 183 north – Sprott	Northern end of SR 183 concurrency
Perry	Marion	62.18	100.07	SR 14 (Martin Luther King Memorial Parkway) – Greensboro, Sprott, Downtown Marion	
Perry		69.86	112.43	SR 175 south – Sprott, Selma	Northern terminus of SR 175
Bibb		80.83	130.08	SR 25 south – Greensboro	Southern end of SR 25 concurrency
Bibb	Brent	83.85	134.94	SR 25 north (Main Street) – Brent, Centreville	Northern end of SR 25 concurrency
Bibb	Brent	86.82	139.72	CR 58 (University Way) – Tuscaloosa, Brent, Centreville	former US 82
Bibb	Brent	87.50	140.82	US 82 – Tuscaloosa, Montgomery, Montevallo	Interchange
Bibb		92.23	148.43	SR 219 south – Centreville	Northern terminus of SR 219
Bibb	West Blocton	98.00	157.72	CR 24 – Vance, West Blocton, Historic Downtown, Cahaba River NWR	
Bibb	Woodstock	105.55	169.87	US 11 south (SR 7) – Tuscaloosa	Southern end of US 11/SR 7 concurrency
Tuscaloosa	Caffee Junction	108.62	174.81	I-20 west / I-59 south – Tuscaloosa	Southern end of I-20/I-59 concurrency; SR 5 south follows exit 97
Tuscaloosa		111.77	179.88	Abernant, Bucksville (SR 216 west)	I-20/I-59 exit 100
Jefferson	Bessemer	113.89	183.29	Rock Mountain Lakes	I-20/I-59 exit 104
Jefferson		117.68	189.39	I-459 north – Gadsden, Montgomery, Atlanta	I-20/I-59 exit 106; I-459 exits 0 A/B; trumpet interchange
Jefferson	Bessemer	119.87	192.91	I-20 east / I-59 north / Powder Plant Road – Birmingham	Northern end of I-20/I-59 concurrency; SR 5 north follows exit 108
Jefferson	Bessemer	123.30	198.43	SR 150 east (14th Street) – Hoover	
Jefferson	Birmingham	133.47	214.80	US 11 north / US 78 east (3rd Avenue West/SR 7 north/SR 4 east)	Southern end of US 78/SR 4 concurrency; northern end of US 11/SR 7 concurrency
Jefferson	Birmingham	134.58	216.59	I-20 / I-59 to I-65 – Tuscaloosa, Downtown Birmingham	I-20/I-59 exit 123
Jefferson	Birmingham	135.31	217.76	SR 378 east (Finley Boulevard) to I-65	Western terminus of SR 378
Jefferson	Birmingham	137.24	220.87	Dugan Avenue	Interchange
Jefferson	Adamsville	141.43	227.61	CR 65 / to Hillcrest Road	
Jefferson	Graysville	145.46	234.10	Graysville, Flat Top, West Jefferson	Interchange
Jefferson	Graysville	146.50	235.77	I-22 / US 78 west (SR 4 west) – Jasper, Memphis, Graysville, Brookside	I-22 exit 85; Northern end of US 78/SR 4 concurrency
Walker	Jasper	169.00	271.98	SR 69 north – Dodge City	Southern end of wrong-way SR 69 concurrency
Walker	Jasper	172.18	277.10	SR 69 south to I-22 – Oakman	Interchange; northern end of wrong-way SR 69 concurrency
Walker	Jasper	173.57	279.33	To SR 195 north / SR 257 – Double Springs	Southern terminus of SR 195
Winston	Natural Bridge	197.78	318.30	US 278 / SR 13 / SR 74 – Russellville, Hamilton, Double Springs, Haleyville	Northern terminus
1.000 mi = 1.609 km; 1.000 km = 0.621 mi: Concurrency terminus

== See also ==
- List of highways numbered 5
