= Alabama State Route 183 =

State highway in Alabama, United States

State Route 183

Route information
- Maintained by ALDOT
- Length: 47.443 mi (76.352 km)

Major junctions
- South end: US 80 in Uniontown
- SR 5 south of Marion; SR 14 in Marion
- North end: US 82 northwest of Maplesville

Location
- Country: United States
- State: Alabama
- Counties: Chilton, Perry

Highway system
- Alabama State Highway System; Interstate; US; State
← SR 182	→ SR 184

State Route 183 (SR 183) is a 47.443-mile (76.352 km) state highway that serves as a north-south connection predominantly through Perry County. SR 183 intersects US 80 at its southern terminus in Uniontown and US 82 at its northern terminus in Chilton County.

== Route description ==
SR 183 begins at its intersection with US 80 in Uniontown. From this point, the route travels in a northerly direction through Uniontown before taking a more northeasterly course en route to Marion. At Marion, SR 183 begins an approximately 4-mile (6.4 km) concurrency with SR 5 through the town and then begins another approximately 4-mile (6.4 km) concurrency SR 14 at the eastern end of Marion through Sprott. From Sprott, SR 183 continues on its northeasterly course through the Talladega National Forest en route to its northern terminus at US 82 in Chilton County.

== Major intersections ==
County	Location	mi	km	Destinations	Notes
Perry	Uniontown	0.0	0.0	US 80 (Washington Street/SR 8) – Selma, Faunsdale, Demopolis	Southern terminus
Perry		16.038	25.811	SR 5 south	Southern end of concurrency with SR 5
Perry	Marion	18.512	29.792	SR 289 north (Washington Street) – Downtown	Southern terminus of SR 289
Perry	Marion	20.268	32.618	SR 5 north – Brent, Centreville	Northern end of concurrency with SR 5
Perry	Marion	21.288	34.260	SR 14 west – Downtown, Greensboro	Southern end of concurrency with SR 14
Perry		23.470	37.771	SR 175 north – Heiberger	Southern terminus of SR 175
Perry	Sprott	25.712	41.379	SR 14 east – Selma	Northern end of concurrency with SR 14
Perry		26.375	42.446	SR 219 south – Selma	Southern end of concurrency with SR 219
Perry		26.820	43.163	SR 219 north – Centreville	Northern end of concurrency with SR 219
Chilton		47.443	76.352	US 82 (SR 6) – Maplesville, Centreville	Northern terminus
1.000 mi = 1.609 km; 1.000 km = 0.621 mi: Concurrency terminus
