= Alabama State Route 162 =

State highway in Alabama, United States

State Route 162

Route information
- Maintained by ALDOT
- Length: 14.080 mi (22.660 km)

Major junctions
- West end: SR 5 in Kimbrough
- East end: SR 28 southeast of Prairie

Location
- Country: United States
- State: Alabama
- Counties: Wilcox

Highway system
- Alabama State Highway System; Interstate; US; State
← SR 161	→ SR 163

State Route 162 (SR 162) is a 14.080-mile (22.660 km) state highway in the northwestern part of Wilcox County. The western terminus of the highway is an intersection with SR 5 in Kimbrough. The eastern terminus of the highway is at an intersection with SR 28 southeast of Prairie.

== Route description ==
SR 162 begins at an intersection with SR 5 in Kimbrough. From this point, SR 162 generally travels in an easterly direction prior to taking a turn towards the northeast en route to its eastern terminus, an intersection with SR 28 southeast of Prairie.

== Major intersections ==
The entire route is in Wilcox County.

Location	mi	km	Destinations	Notes
Kimbrough	0.0	0.0	SR 5 – Pine Hill, Thomasville, Marion	Western terminus
	14.080	22.660	SR 28 – Thomaston, Camden	Eastern terminus
1.000 mi = 1.609 km; 1.000 km = 0.621 mi
