= Alabama State Route 175 =

State highway in Alabama, United States

State Route 175

Route information
- Maintained by ALDOT
- Length: 5.382 mi (8.661 km)

Major junctions
- South end: SR 14 / SR 183 near Marion
- North end: SR 5 near Heiberger

Location
- Country: United States
- State: Alabama
- Counties: Perry

Highway system
- Alabama State Highway System; Interstate; US; State
← SR 174	→ SR 176

State Route 175 (SR 175) is a 5.382-mile (8.661 km) state highway in Perry County. The route's southern terminus is at its junction with SR 14 and SR 183, approximately three miles northeast of Marion. The route's northern terminus is at its junction with SR 5. approximately one mile south of Heiberger, the birthplace of Coretta Scott King.

== Route description ==
The north–south route is aligned along a two-lane road in rural Perry County, part of the Black Belt of west-central Alabama. The route serves as an eastern bypass around Marion for motorists driving from westbound State Route 14 towards northbound State Route 5.

== Major intersections ==
The entire route is in Perry County.

Location	mi	km	Destinations	Notes
	0.0	0.0	SR 14 / SR 183 – Marion, Selma, Maplesville	Southern terminus
	5.382	8.661	SR 5 – Marion, Brent	Northern terminus
1.000 mi = 1.609 km; 1.000 km = 0.621 mi
