= Kornegay =

Kornegay is a surname. Notable people by that name include:

- George Paul Kornegay (1913–2014), was an American folk and outsider artist.
- Horace R. Kornegay (1924–2009), U.S. Representative from North Carolina.
- Charles Kornegay (born 1974), American-Spanish basketball player.
- W. H. Kornegay (1865–1935), attorney in private practice in Vinita, Oklahoma.
- Tad Kornegay, retired professional Canadian football defensive back.
