= Alabama State Route 14 =

Highway in Alabama

State Route 14
- SR 14 highlighted in red

Route information
- Maintained by ALDOT
- Length: 218.289 mi (351.302 km)

Major junctions
- West end: MS 69 at the Mississippi state line near Macedonia
- I-20 / I-59 at Eutaw; US 11 / US 43 at Eutaw; US 80 at Selma; US 82 at Prattville; US 31 at Prattville; I-65 at Prattville; US 231 / SR 111 Truck at Wetumpka
- East end: SR 147 at Auburn

Location
- Country: United States
- State: Alabama
- Counties: Pickens, Greene, Hale, Perry, Dallas, Autauga, Elmore, Tallapoosa, Macon, Lee

Highway system
- Alabama State Highway System; Interstate; US; State
← SR 13	→ SR 15

State Route 14 (SR 14) is a major east-to-west state highway in the U.S. state of Alabama. Spanning 218.289 miles (351.302 km), the highway begins at the Mississippi state line at the terminus of Mississippi Highway 69 (MS 69) and connects the cities of Selma and Prattville before ending at SR 147 on the western side of Auburn.

== History ==
SR 14 was one of the original routes in the Alabama's first statewide highway system in the 1920s. The original routing followed much of the same path as today, but was significantly shorter. The highway as built then started in Selma and traveled east along its current route to Auburn. As was standard for highways of the era, SR 14 was unpaved for its full length. The first paved section was constructed in 1932 between Elmore and Wetumpka. Paving continued sporadically for the next 15 years, with the last gravel section on the route being paved in 1947.

In 1956–57, the state renumbered many highways, and as a result other state highways to the northwest of Selma were renumbered as SR 14, extending the highway to the Mississippi state line along its modern course. In the 1960s, when the first segment of Interstate 85 (I-85) was constructed, bypassing Auburn and Opelika, SR 14 was extended from its eastern end at US 29 in Auburn along US 29 through Opelika to the northern end of that first Interstate Highway segment, at the current exit 64. When US 280 was re-routed to meet I-85 between Auburn and Opelika in 1998, SR-14 was truncated to a new eastern endpoint at US 280 in Opelika. In 2009, it was further truncated to its present terminus at the junction with SR 147.

== Local routings and Gallery ==
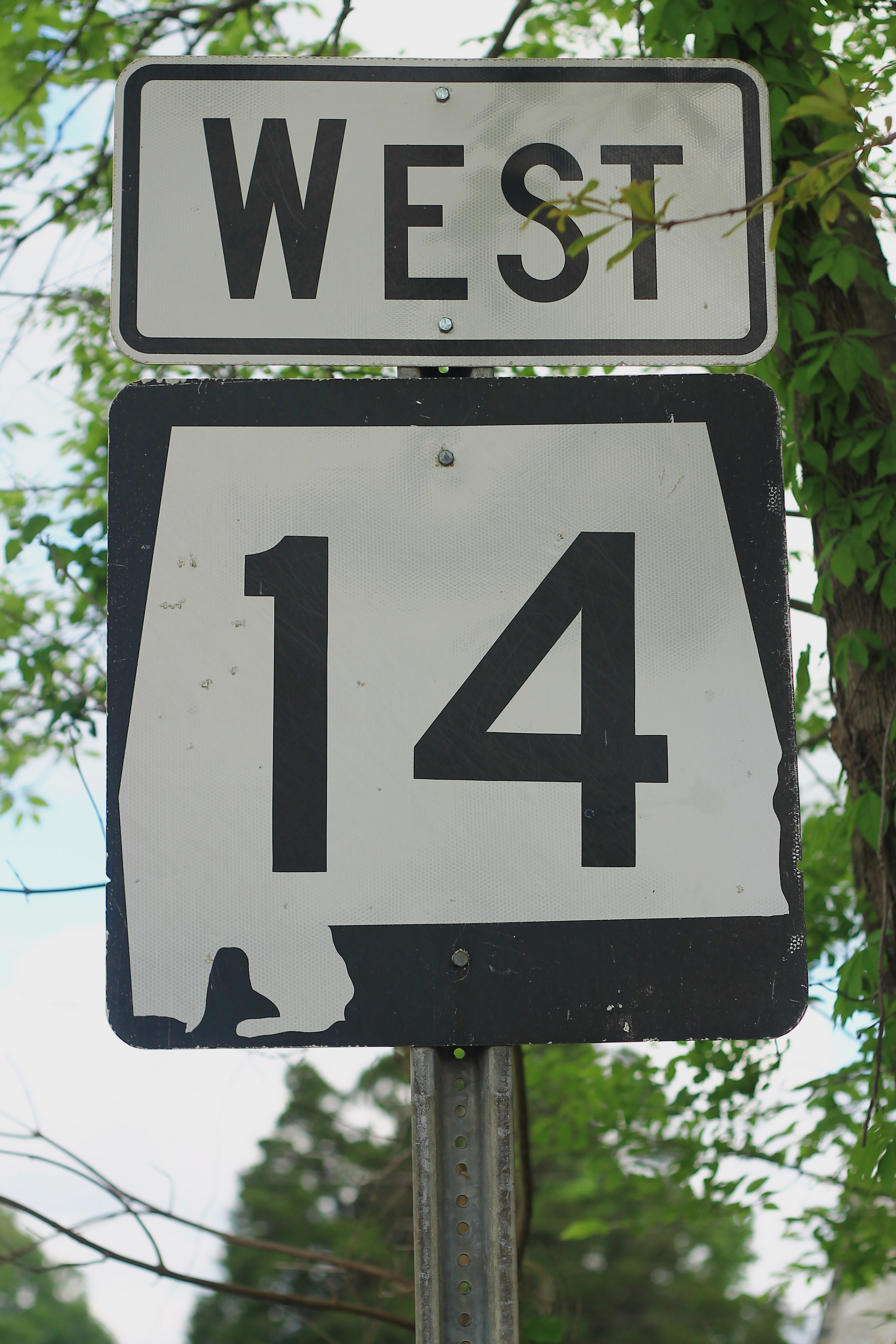
A sign for westbound Alabama State Route 14, located in Pickensville.

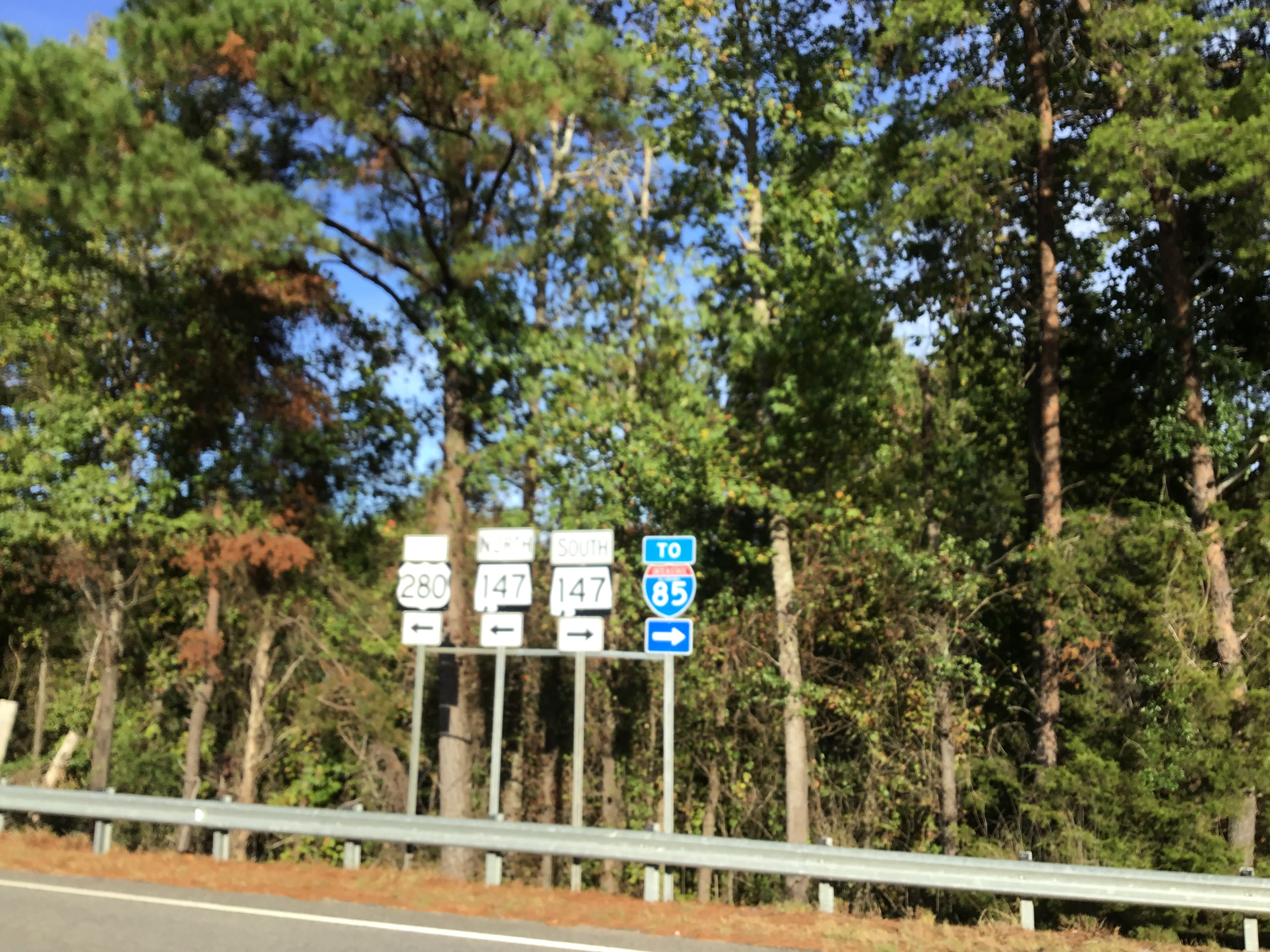
The current terminus of SR 14 at Shug Jordan Parkway, Auburn, Alabama.

- SR 14 is routed along Broad Street in Pickensville.
- SR 14 is routed along Columbus Road NW, 2nd Street NW, 1st Avenue, 3rd Street SE, and Dr. Martin Luther King Memorial Highway in Aliceville.
- SR 14 is routed along Mesopotamia Street, Eutaw Avenue, Main Street, Morrow Avenue, Boligee Street, and Greensboro Street in Eutaw.
- SR 14 is routed along Hobson Street and State Street in Greensboro.
- SR 14 is routed along West Greene Street, Washington Street, and Martin Luther King Parkway in Marion.
- SR 14 shares a route with SR 183 for 5 miles (8.0 km) between Marion and Sprott in Perry County.
- SR 14 shares a route with SR 219 for 4 miles (6.4 km) north of US 80 in Selma, Alabama.
- SR 14 shares a route with US 80 for 4 miles (6.4 km) through Selma.
- SR 14 is routed along Highland Avenue in Selma.
- SR 14 shares a route with US 82 for roughly five miles in Prattville.
- SR 14 is routed along I-65 in Prattville between Exits 179 and 181
- SR 14 is routed along Elmore Road, Coosa River Parkway, and Tallassee Highway in Wetumpka.
- SR 14 shares a route with SR 111 in Wetumpka.
- SR 14 is routed along Gilmer Avenue, Barnette Boulevard, Central Boulevard, Main Street, and Notasulga Road in Tallassee.
- SR 14 is routed along Tallapoosa Street and Auburn Road in Notasulga.

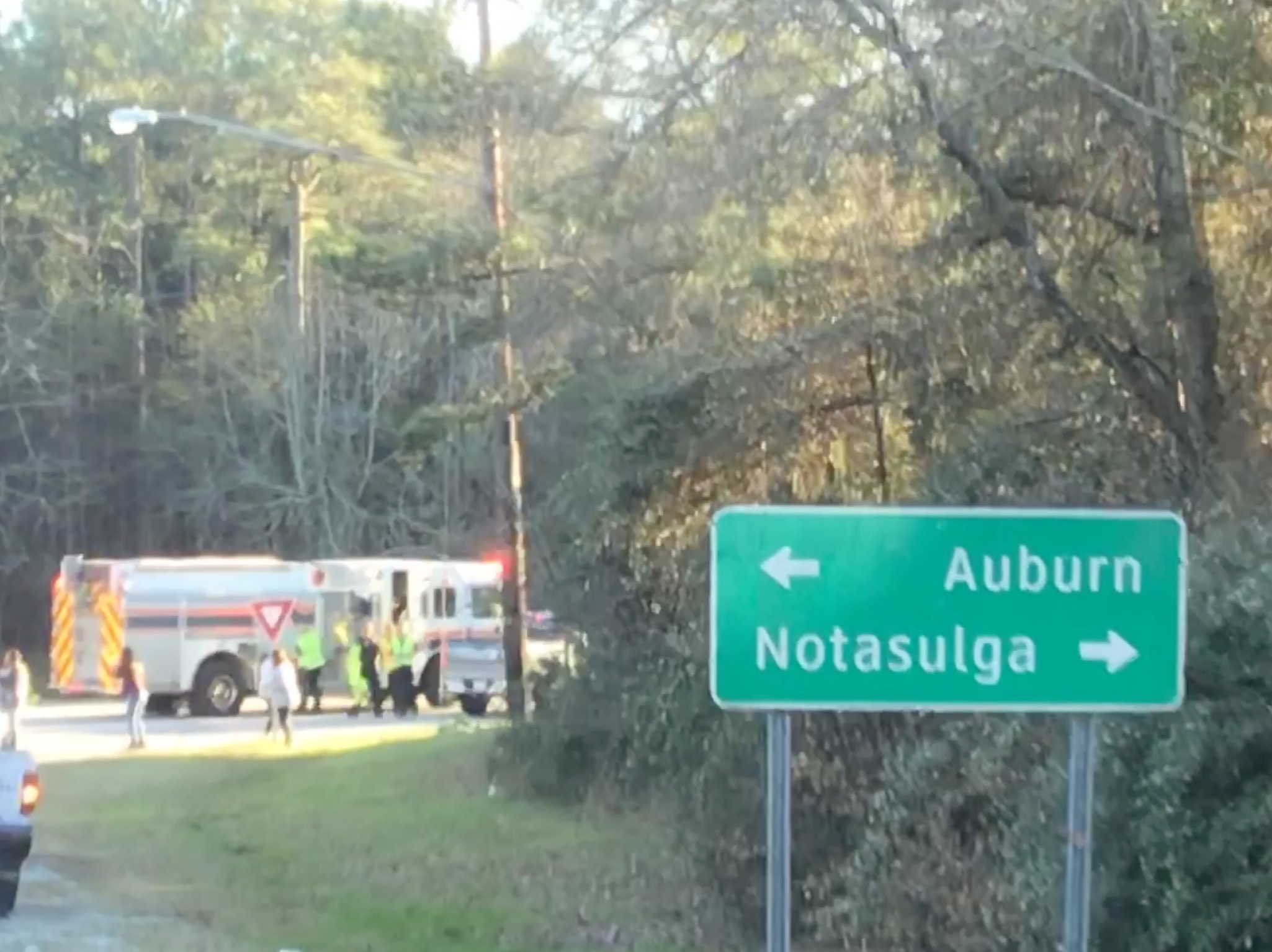
A road sign on the state route, feet away from the road's eastern terminus. Turning right continues the state route. Turning left enters Auburn out of SR-14.

== Major intersections ==
County	Location	mi	km	Destinations	Notes
Pickens		0.00	0.00	MS 69 north – Columbus	Mississippi state line; Western terminus
Pickens	Pickensville	9.41	15.14	SR 86 (Main Street) – Pickensville Campground	
Pickens	Aliceville	19.26	31.00	SR 17 south – Airport	Western end of SR 17 concurrency
Pickens	Aliceville	19.55	31.46	SR 17 north (Memorial Parkway) – Carrollton	Eastern end of SR 17 concurrency
Greene	Clinton	38.27	61.59	SR 39 south – Gainesville, Heflin Lock-Dam	
Greene	Eutaw	43.43	69.89	I-20 / I-59 – Tuscaloosa, Meridian	I-20/I-59 exit 40
Greene	Eutaw	46.41	74.69	US 11 south (Prairie Avenue / SR 7) – Livingston	West end of US 11 south / SR 7 south concurrency (westbound only)
Greene	Eutaw	46.44	74.74	US 11 north / US 43 north (Tuscaloosa Street / SR 7 / SR 13) – Tuscaloosa	east end of US 11 south / SR 7 south concurrency (westbound only); west end of US 11 north / SR 7 north concurrency (eastbound only); west end of US 43 / SR 13 concurrency
Greene	Eutaw	46.46	74.77	To US 11 south / Boligee Street – Livingston	East end of US 11 north / SR 7 north concurrency (eastbound only)
Greene	Eutaw	46.99	75.62	US 43 south (Demopolis Highway / SR 13) – Demopolis	Eastern end of US 43 / SR 13 concurrency
Hale	Wedgeworth	54.21	87.24	SR 60 east – Akron, Moundville	
Hale	Greensboro	67.65	108.87	SR 25 south / SR 69 south (Demopolis Street) – Faunsdale, Linden	Western end of SR 25/SR 69 concurrency
Hale	Greensboro	68.00	109.44	SR 25 north / SR 69 north (Tuscaloosa Street) – Moundville, Brent	Eastern end of SR 25/SR 69 concurrency
Hale	Greensboro	68.88	110.85	SR 61 south – Uniontown	
Perry	Marion	86.96	139.95	SR 289 south / CR 45 south (Washington Street)	
Perry	Marion	88.55	142.51	SR 5 – Brent, Browns	
Perry		89.36	143.81	SR 183 south – Uniontown	Western end of SR 183 concurrency
Perry		91.55	147.34	SR 175 north – Brent	
Perry	Sprott	93.79	150.94	SR 183 north – Maplesville	Eastern end of SR 183 concurrency
Dallas		111.35	179.20	SR 219 north – Centreville	Western end of SR 219 concurrency
Dallas	Valley Grande	112.13	180.46	SR 219 south / CR 49 north	Eastern end of SR 219 concurrency
Dallas	Selma	114.20	183.79	US 80 west / SR 22 Truck west (SR 8) – Meridian	Western end of US 80/SR 8/SR 22 Truck concurrency
Dallas	Selma	116.28	187.13	US 80 Bus. east / SR 22 (SR 8/Broad Street) – Birmingham, Montgomery, Paul M. Grist State Park, Historic Downtown, Edmund Pettus Bridge	Eastern end of SR 22 Truck concurrency (it ends at this intersection); Eastern end of SR 8 concurrency (SR 8 follows Business US 80 through Selma.)
Dallas	Selma	117.16	188.55	US 80 east / SR 41 south	Eastern end of US 80 concurrency
Dallas	Burnsville	126.34	203.32	SR 140 west	
Autauga	Prattville	151.04	243.08	US 82 west (SR 6) / Selma Highway – Tuscaloosa, Prattville, Daniel Pratt Historic District	Western end of US 82/SR 6 concurrency
Autauga	Prattville	153.86	247.61	US 31 south (SR 3) / US 82 east (SR 6) to I-65 – Montgomery	Eastern end of US 82/SR 6 concurrency; western end of US 31/SR 3 concurrency
Autauga	Prattville	154.28	248.29	US 31 north (Memorial Drive / SR 3) – Birmingham	Eastern end of US 31/SR 3 concurrency
Elmore		157.44	253.38	I-65 – Birmingham, Montgomery	I-65 exit 181
Elmore	Millbrook	160.25	257.90	SR 143 south (Main Street) / CR 7 north – Millbrook	Western end of SR 143 concurrency
Elmore	Elmore	164.49	264.72	SR 143 north – Speigner, Marbury	Eastern end of SR 143 concurrency
Elmore	Wetumpka	170.08	273.72	SR 212 east (West Bridge Street) – Downtown Wetumpka	
Elmore	Wetumpka	171.34	275.75	SR 111 north (Holtville Road) / SR 111 Truck begins – Holtville, Downtown Wetumpka	Western end of SR 111 Truck concurrency (it ends at this intersection)
Elmore	Wetumpka	172.87	278.21	US 231 (SR 9 / SR 53) / SR 21 / SR 111 Truck ends – Rockford, Montgomery	Eastern end of SR 111 Truck concurrency
Elmore	Wetumpka	173.69	279.53	SR 170	
Elmore	Claud	180.48	290.45	SR 63 north – Eclectic, Kowaliga, Alexander City	
Elmore	Tallassee	188.45	303.28	SR 229 north – Kent, Red Hill	Western end of SR 229 concurrency
Elmore	Tallassee	192.04	309.06	SR 229 south (Jordan Avenue) to I-85 CR 8 west (Friendship Road)	Eastern end of SR 229 concurrency
Tallapoosa		197.83	318.38	SR 49 – Dadeville	
Macon		200.56	322.77	SR 199 south / CR 35 north	
Macon–Tallapoosa county line	Liberty City	202.19	325.39	SR 120	
Macon	Notasulga	207.36	333.71	SR 81 south – Business District	
Lee	Auburn	218.29	351.30	SR 147 (Shug Jordan Parkway) to I-85 / US 280	Eastern terminus
1.000 mi = 1.609 km; 1.000 km = 0.621 mi: Concurrency terminus
