= Alabama State Route 43 =

There is no current State Route 43 in the U.S. state of Alabama.

- See U.S. Route 43 in Alabama for the current route numbered 43
- See Alabama State Route 43 (pre-1957) for the former SR 43
