= Alabama State Route 45 =

There is no current State Route 45 in the U.S. state of Alabama. Alabama Route 45 may refer to:

- U.S. Route 45 in Alabama
- Alabama State Route 143, numbered State Route 45 prior to 1957, renumbered to avoid confusion with U.S. Route 45
