= Alabama State Route 289 =

State highway in Alabama, United States

State Route 289

Route information
- Maintained by ALDOT
- Length: 1.202 mi (1.934 km)

Major junctions
- South end: SR 5 / SR 183 in Marion
- North end: SR 14 in Marion

Location
- Country: United States
- State: Alabama
- Counties: Perry

Highway system
- Alabama State Highway System; Interstate; US; State
← SR 287	→ SR 291

State Route 289 (SR 289) is a 1.202-mile-long (1.934 km) route that serves as a connection between both SR 5/183 and SR 14 within Marion in Perry County. It is known as Washington Street and Fikes Ferry Access for its entire length.

== Route description ==
The southern terminus of SR 289 is located at its junction with SR 5 and SR 183 in southern Marion. The route then takes a generally northward track along Fikes Ferry Access before curving to the west and coming to an intersection with Washington Street, where it turns north again to its northern terminus at SR 14 in the central business district of Marion.

== Major intersections ==
The entire route is in Marion, Perry County.

mi	km	Destinations	Notes
0.000	0.000	SR 5 / SR 183 – Pine Hill, Uniontown, Brent, Maplesville	Southern terminus
1.202	1.934	SR 14 (Green Street) – Greensboro, Selma	Northern terminus
1.000 mi = 1.609 km; 1.000 km = 0.621 mi
