= Alabama State Route 219 =

State highway in Alabama, United States

State Route 219

Route information
- Maintained by ALDOT
- Length: 47.590 mi (76.589 km)

Major junctions
- South end: SR 22 southwest of Selma
- US 80 west of Selma; SR 14 northwest of Selma; SR 183 in northeastern Perry County; US 82 at Centreville
- North end: SR 5 north of Centreville

Location
- Country: United States
- State: Alabama
- Counties: Dallas, Perry, Bibb

Highway system
- Alabama State Highway System; Interstate; US; State
| ← SR 217 | → SR 221 |

State Route 219 (SR 219) is a 45-mile (72 km) state highway in Dallas, Perry, and Bibb counties in Alabama, United States, that serves as a connector route between Selma and Centreville.

== Route description ==
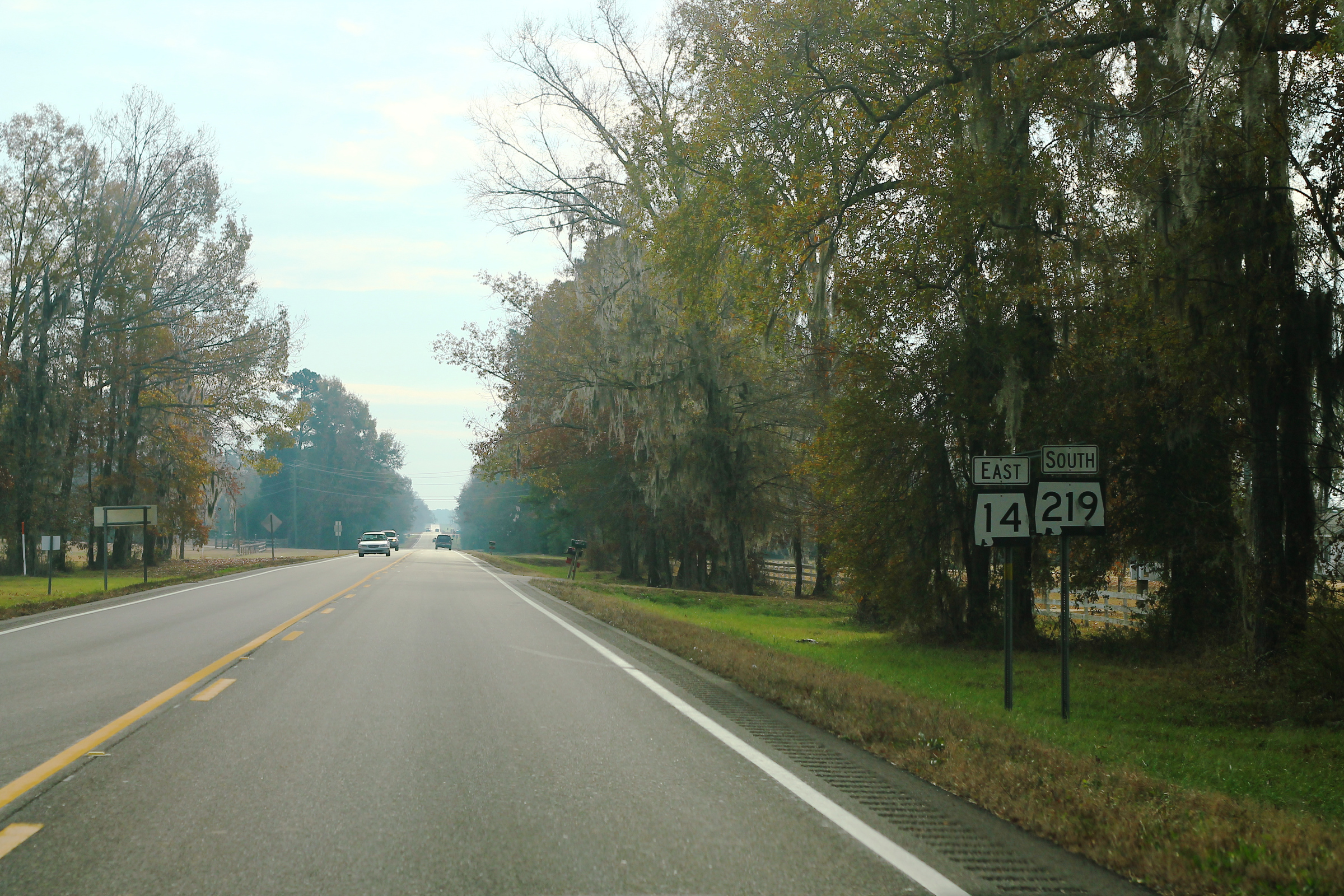
South on SR 219 and east on State Route 14 in Dallas County, December 2013

The southern terminus of SR 219 is located at its intersection with SR 22 in Selma. From this point, the route travels in a northward direction before terminating at SR 5 north of Centreville. SR 219 has brief concurrencies with SR 14 northwest of Selma, with SR 183 in northwestern Perry County, and with SR 25 and US 82 in Centreville.

== Major intersections ==
| County | Location | mi | km | Destinations | Notes |
|---|---|---|---|---|---|
| Dallas | Selma | 0.000 | 0.000 | SR 22 (W Dallas Avenue) / SR 22 Truck begins – Orrville, Downtown | Southern terminus; Southern end of SR 22 Truck concurrency |
| Dallas | | 3.659 | 5.889 | US 80 (SR 8) / SR 22 Truck north – Uniontown, Selma | Northern end of SR 22 Truck concurrency |
| Dallas | | 5.067 | 8.155 | SR 14 east – Selma | Southern end of SR 14 concurrency |
| Dallas | | 5.847 | 9.410 | SR 14 west – Marion | Northern end of SR 14 concurrency |
| Perry | | 26.375 | 42.446 | SR 183 west – Marion | Southern end of SR 183 concurrency |
| Perry | | 26.820 | 43.163 | SR 183 east – Maplesville | Northern end of SR 183 concurrency |
| Bibb | Centreville | 41.262 | 66.405 | SR 25 north (Montevallo Road) – Wilton, Montevallo | Southern end of SR 25 concurrency |
| Bibb | Centreville | 41.562 | 66.888 | SR 25 south (Walnut Street) – Brent | Northern end of SR 25 concurrency |
| Bibb | Centreville | 42.569 | 68.508 | US 82 (SR 6) – Tuscaloosa, Maplesville | |
| Bibb | | 47.590 | 76.589 | SR 5 – West Blocton, Brent | Northern terminus |
1.000 mi = 1.609 km; 1.000 km = 0.621 mi: Concurrency terminus
