= Alabama State Route 212 =

State highway in Alabama, United States

State Route 212
- West Bridge Street
- SR 212 highlighted in red

Route information
- Maintained by ALDOT
- Length: 1.145 mi (1.843 km)

Major junctions
- West end: SR 14 in Wetumpka
- East end: SR 111 in Wetumpka

Location
- Country: United States
- State: Alabama
- Counties: Elmore

Highway system
- Alabama State Highway System; Interstate; US; State
← SR 211	→ SR 213

State Route 212 (SR 212) is a 1.145-mile-long (1.843 km) route that serves as a connection between SR 14 and SR 111 in Wetumpka in Elmore County.

== Route description ==
The western terminus of SR 212 is located at its intersection with SR 14 west of downtown Wetumpka. From this point, the route travels in an easterly direction towards downtown where it terminates at SR 111. Through the city, this is also signed as West Bridge Street.

== Major intersections ==
The entire route is in Wetumpka, Elmore County.

mi	km	Destinations	Notes
0.0	0.0	SR 14 – Elmore, Tallassee	Western terminus
1.145	1.843	SR 111 (N/E Bridge Street) – Holtville	Eastern terminus
1.000 mi = 1.609 km; 1.000 km = 0.621 mi
