= Alabama State Route 143 =

State highway in Alabama, United States

State Route 143

Route information
- Maintained by ALDOT
- Length: 28.598 mi (46.024 km)
- Existed: 1957–present

Major junctions
- South end: I-65 / US 82 northwest of Montgomery
- North end: US 31 near Clanton

Location
- Country: United States
- State: Alabama

Highway system
- Alabama State Highway System; Interstate; US; State
← SR 142	→ SR 144

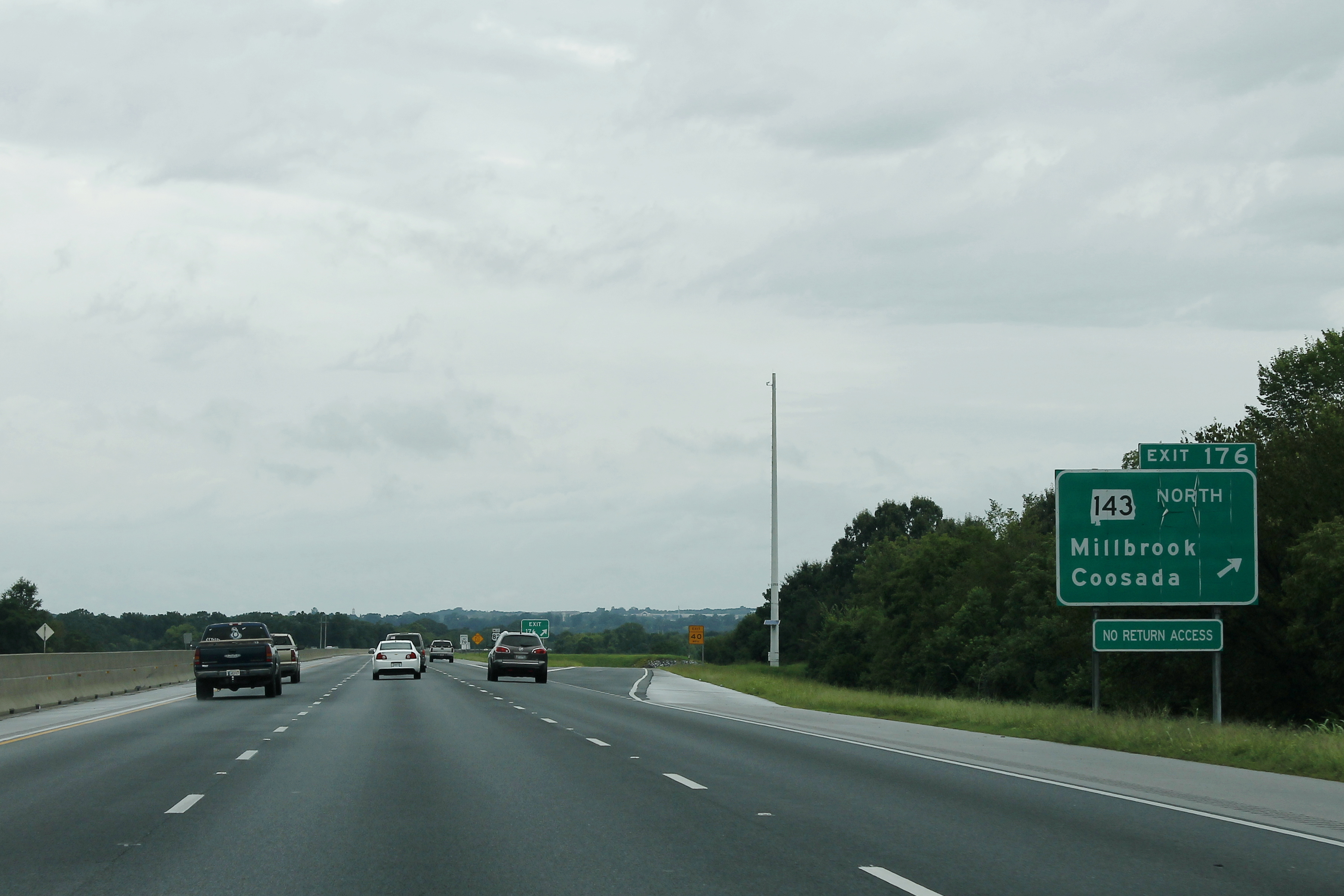
A highway sign depicting AL 143 being exit 176 on I-65.

State Route 143 (SR 143) is a 28.598-mile-long (46.024 km) north–south state highway in the central part of the U.S. state of Alabama, extending north from Interstate 65 (I-65) and U.S. Route 82 (US 82) northwest of Montgomery to US 31 near Clanton. It parallels I-65, traveling through Millbrook, Elmore, and Deatsville.

== History ==
Prior to the 1957 renumbering, SR 143 was numbered State Route 45; it was renumbered because of US 45.

Prior to the construction of I-65, SR 143 crossed the Alabama River on the Tyler–Goodwyn Bridge and entered Montgomery on Parallel Street. The bridge, scene of the murder of Willie Edwards, was subsequently removed.

== Major intersections ==
County	Location	mi	km	Destinations	Notes
Montgomery		0.000	0.000	I-65 south / US 82 east (SR 6)	Southern terminus; no access from I-65 south/US 82 east or to I-65 north/US 82 west
Elmore	Millbrook	4.181	6.729	To I-65 north (Cobbs Ford Road)	
Elmore	Millbrook	7.131	11.476	SR 14 west to I-65 – Prattville	South end of SR 14 concurrency
Elmore		11.372	18.301	SR 14 east – Wetumpka	North end of SR 14 concurrency
Autauga		22.451	36.131	SR 111 east / CR 121 west	Western terminus of SR 111; eastern terminus of CR 121
Chilton		28.598	46.024	US 31 (SR 3) – Prattville, Clanton	Northern terminus
1.000 mi = 1.609 km; 1.000 km = 0.621 mi: Concurrency terminus; Incomplete access
