= Prairie Mission =

- U.S. National Register of Historic Places
- Alabama Register of Landmarks and Heritage
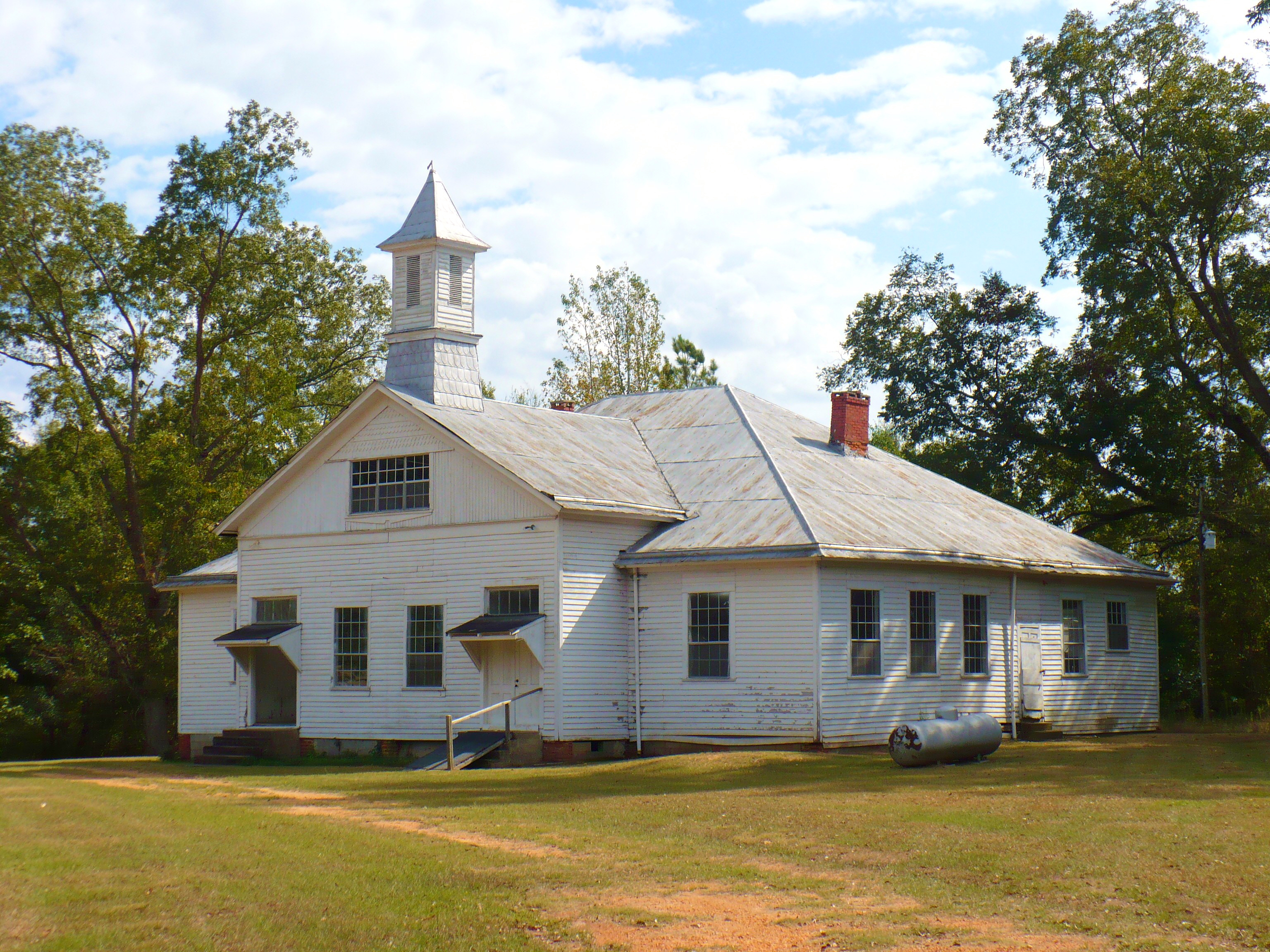

- Location within Alabama Location within the United States
- Location: Prairie, Alabama
- Coordinates: 32°8′30″N 87°25′40″W
- Built: 1894
- NRHP reference No.: 01001171

Significant dates
- Added to NRHP: October 29, 2001
- Designated ARLH: July 22, 1991

Prairie Mission, also known as the Prairie Mission School and Prairie Institute, was a historic African American school in the community of Prairie, Alabama. The school is the only survivor of the six original Presbyterian mission schools that once operated in Wilcox County. It was placed on the Alabama Register of Landmarks and Heritage on July 22, 1991 and subsequently on the National Register of Historic Places on October 29, 2001, due its significance to African American history.

== History ==
The school was founded as a mission of the Freedmen's Board of the United Presbyterian Church of North America in 1894. Classes for as many as 300 African American children, in grades 1–9, were held at the school up until the 1950s. After that time, students in grades 7–9 were sent to the mission school in nearby Millers Ferry. The school was discontinued in the late 1960s, coinciding with the end of segregation in Alabama public schools.

== Architecture ==
The school campus originally included the school building, a Presbyterian church, two dormitories, and a two-story principal's house. Although the dormitories have been demolished, the school building, the church, and the principal's house remain intact. The school building and church are owned and maintained by the Presbyterians of Wilcox County group. The principal's house is privately owned.

The school building is a large one-story structure with a pyramidal hipped roof. The front (north) elevation is six bays wide, with the central four bays projecting forward of the main facade. These four bays, containing two windows and two entrance doors, are topped by a gabled roof, which in turn is crowned with a small belfry. The entrance doors are each sheltered under a projecting shed roof supported by brackets. All of the original windows have been replaced with smaller, more modern, versions. The side elevations both have six bays, originally with five windows and one door on each side. The rear elevation features a projecting gabled ell and a smaller shed room. The interior is divided by a central assembly room that is flanked on both sides by two classrooms.

The church building, reworked in the mid-20th century, features a front-gabled main auditorium four bays deep. The front gable features a small arched window and a decorative gable bracket. The building is entered through a corner bell tower with a pyramidal roof.
