= Alabama State Route 111 =

Highway in Alabama

State Route 111
- SR 111 in red, SR 111 Truck in blue

Route information
- Maintained by ALDOT
- Length: 16.073 mi (25.867 km)

Major junctions
- South end: SR 212 in Wetumpka
- SR 14 in Wetumpka
- North end: SR 143 west of Coosa River

Location
- Country: United States
- State: Alabama

Highway system
- Alabama State Highway System; Interstate; US; State
← SR 110	→ SR 113

State Route 111 (SR 111) is a 16.073-mile-long (25.867 km) state highway in Elmore and Autauga counties in the central part of the U.S. state of Alabama. The southern terminus of the highway is at an intersection with SR 212 in Wetumpka. The northern terminus of the highway is at an intersection with SR 143 west of Coosa River.

== Route description ==
SR 111 begins at an intersection with SR 212 in Wetumpka. About one mile (1.6 km) later, it intersects SR 14. After crossing Jordan Lake, SR 111 travels through Holtville. SR 111 enters Autauga County before it reaches the northern terminus, an intersection with SR 143 west of Coosa River.

== Major intersections ==
County	Location	mi	km	Destinations	Notes
Elmore	Wetumpka	0.000	0.000	SR 212	Southern terminus
Elmore	Wetumpka	1.161	1.868	SR 14 – Prattville, Tallassee	
Autauga		16.073	25.867	SR 143	Northern terminus
1.000 mi = 1.609 km; 1.000 km = 0.621 mi

== Truck route ==
State Route 111 Truck
- Location: Wetumpka
- Length: 1.5 mi (2.4 km)

State Route 111 Truck (SR 111 Truck) is a truck route of SR 111 in Wetumpka. It travels from SR 14 to U.S. Route 231 (US 231; also unsigned SR 53). The truck route stays on SR 14 the entire routing, known as Coosa River Parkway. SR 111 Truck crosses the Coosa River before ending at US 231.
