= Natural Bridge Park =

Private park in Winston County, Alabama, USA

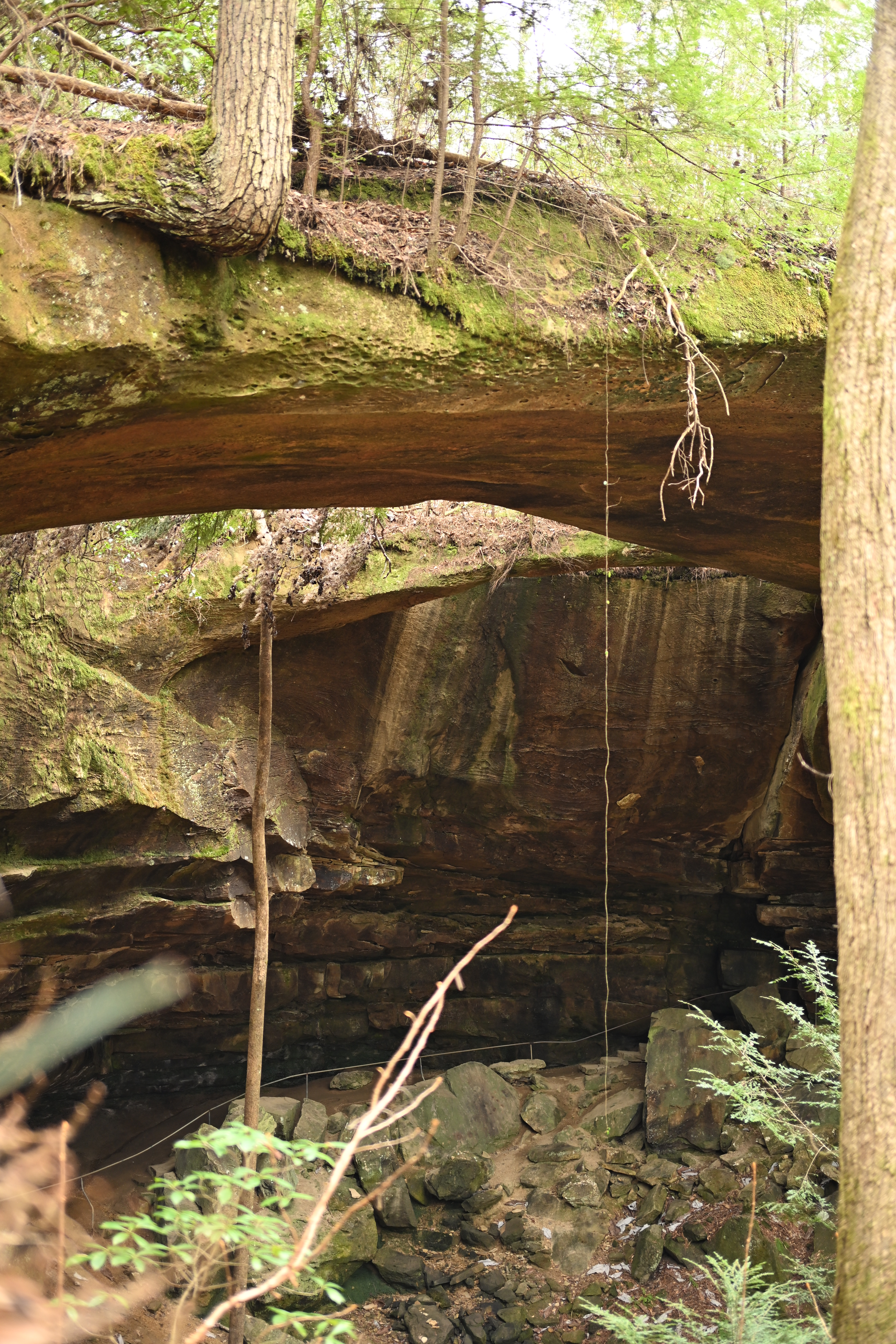
- Natural arches at the Park.
- Interactive map of Natural Bridge Park
- Location: Winston County, Alabama
- Nearest town: Natural Bridge, Alabama
- Coordinates: 34°05′35″N 87°36′53″W
- Opened: 1954
- Owner: Donnie and Naomi Lowman
- Operator: Donnie and Naomi Lowman
- Status: open
- Hiking trails: 2 mile nature path

Natural Bridge Park, near the town of Natural Bridge, Alabama, is a privately owned park in Winston County that has been open since 1954. The current owners are Donnie and Naomi Lowman.

The Park's primary attraction is a natural-arch rock formation that is 60 feet (18 m) high, 148 feet (45 m) long, and composed of sandstone and iron ore. The bridge is purported to be the longest natural arch east of the Rocky Mountains in North America. A two-mile nature trail guides visitors beneath the arch and past nearby rock formations. Walking across the bridge itself is not permitted, due to safety concerns.

The Park includes picnic accommodations, an artesian well that supplies drinking fountains, a gift shop featuring hand-crafted items, 27 varieties of fern, and a stand of eastern hemlock (Tsuga canadensis)—a species that dates back to the Pleistocene epoch (approximately 2,580,000 to 11,700 years ago).

Downhill from the arch is an outcropping of rock resembling a Native American head in right profile, similar to that of an old U.S. "Indian head" nickel. The stone formation is just over 15 feet (4.6 m) high.

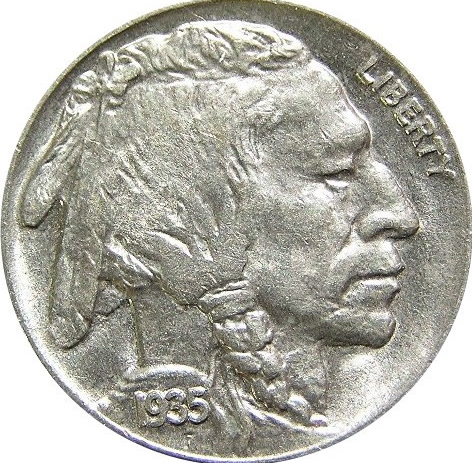
Indian head nickel.

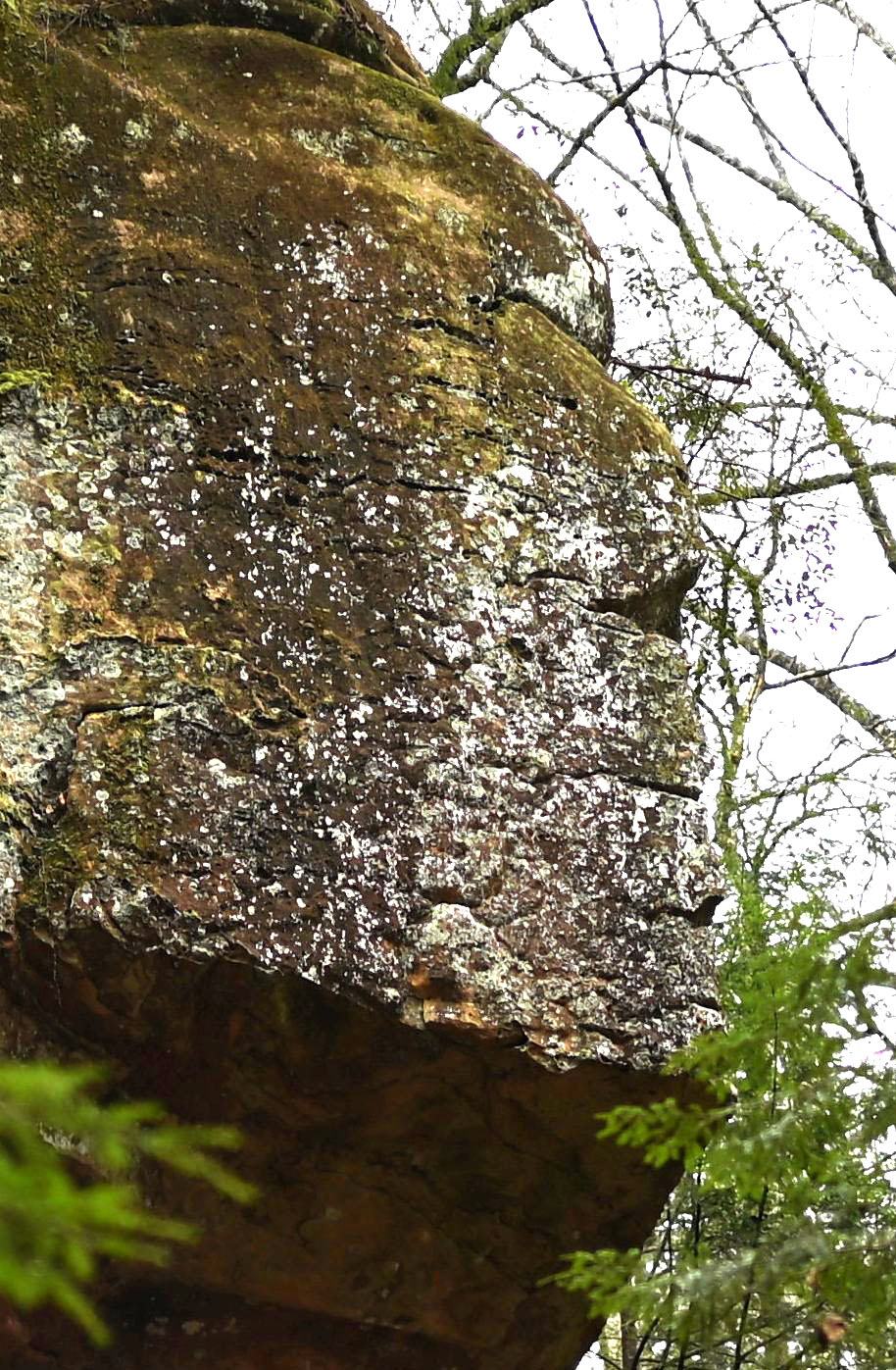
Stone formation.

As of 2024, the park is open from 8:00 am until 4:00 pm seven days a week and admission is $10.00 for adults.

== History ==
This natural-arch formation dates back about 200 million years. It was formed by the New River eroding weaker sandstone away from the stronger stone which constitutes the bridge spans.

Muscogee Creek Indians lived in this area, and they probably used the bridge-cave enclosure for shelter.

The Park itself was opened to the public by the Legg family in 1954. In recent years, it was owned and operated by Jim and Barbara Denton. In August 2023, Donnie and Naomi Lowman purchased it and are now running it (as of January 2024).

== Gallery ==
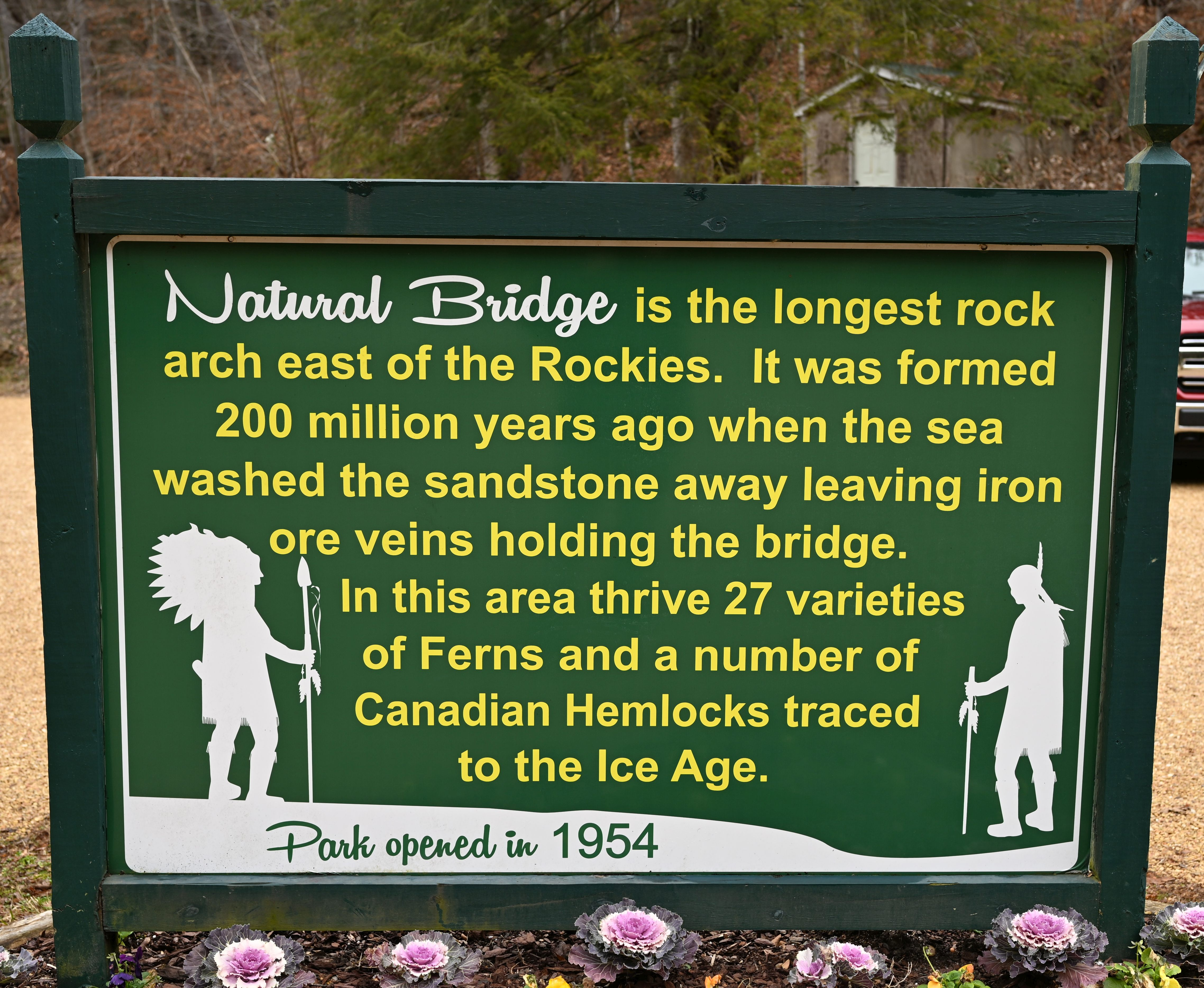
Entrance sign.

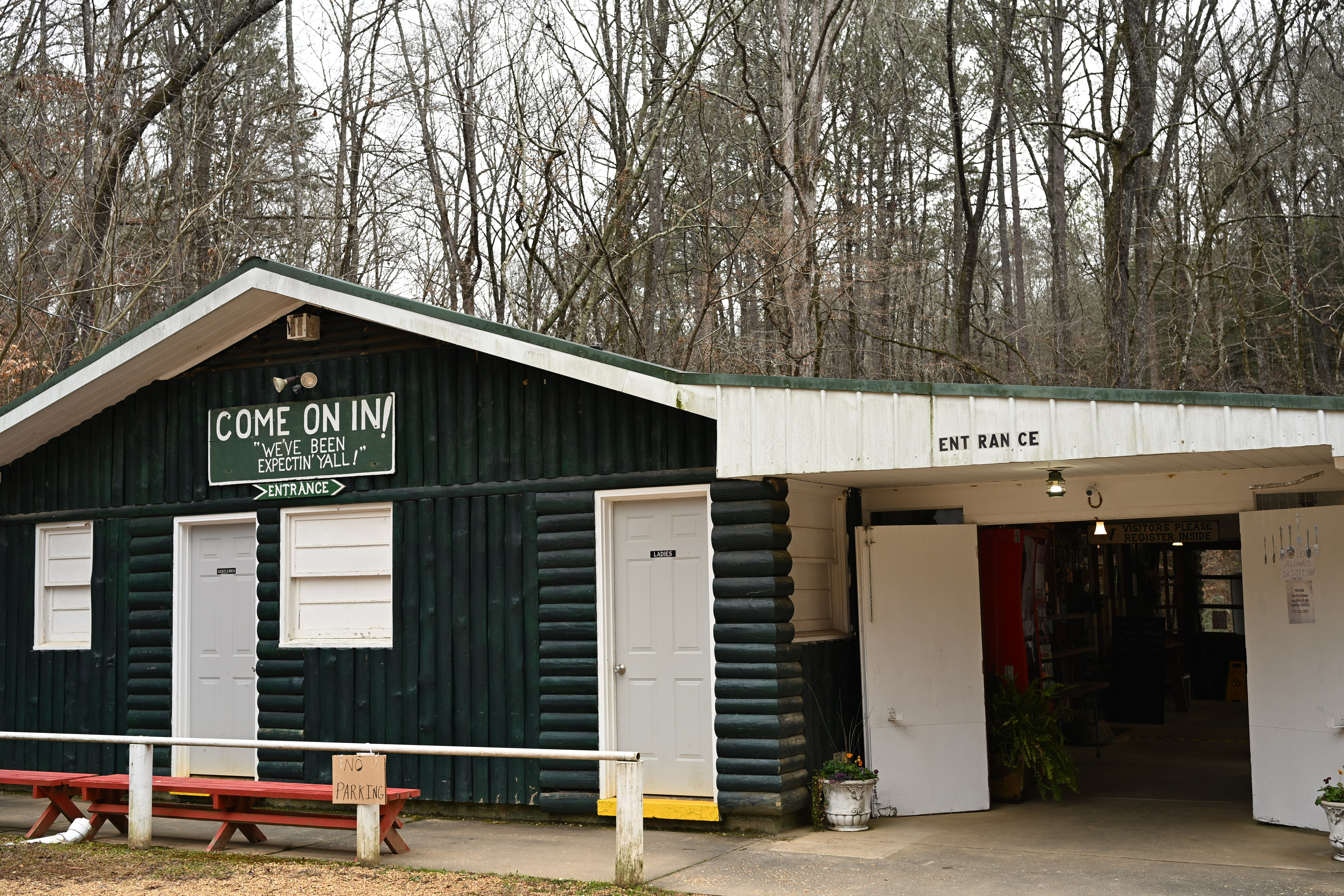
Entrance and gift shop.

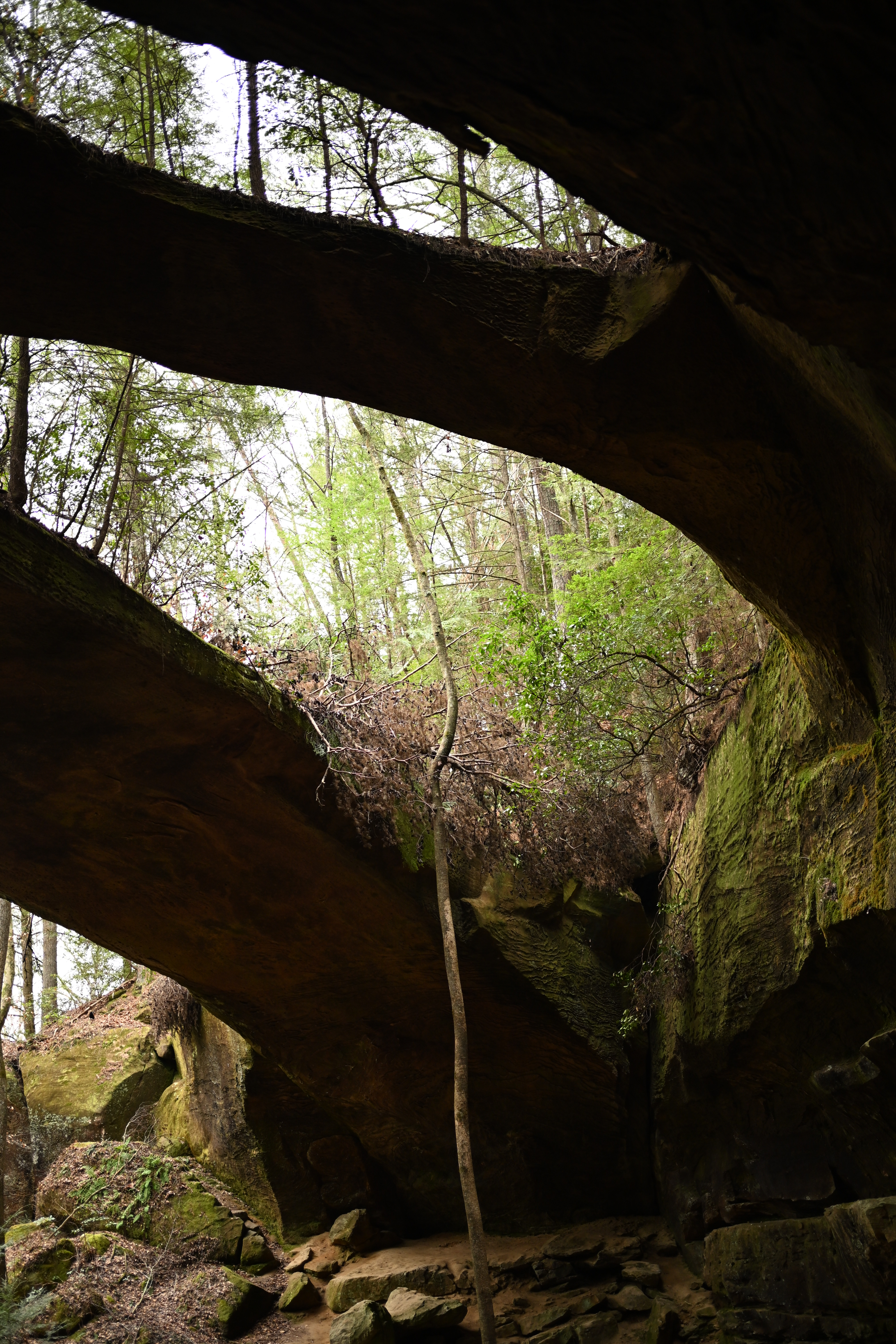
View from under the arch, looking upward.

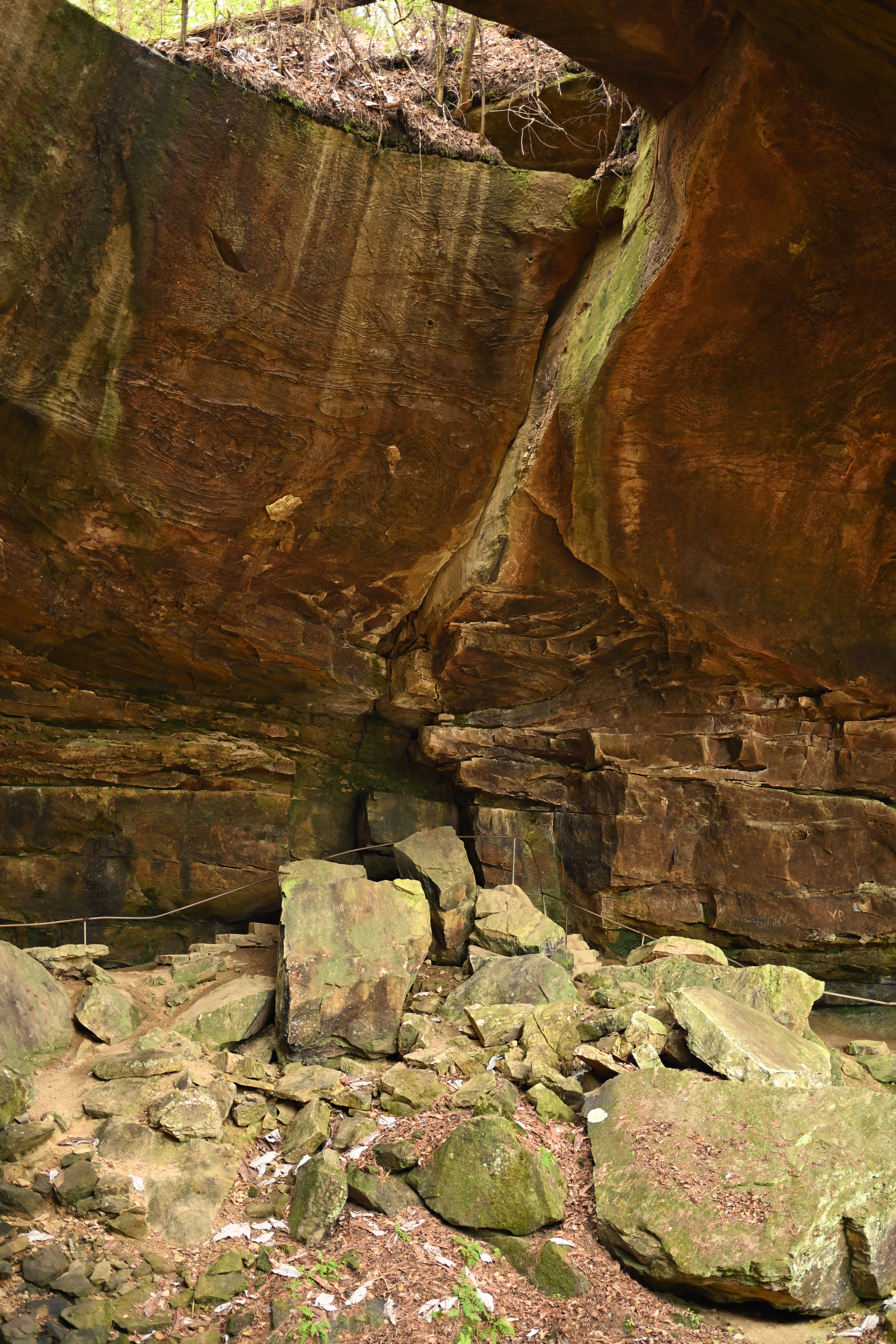
Under the bridge.

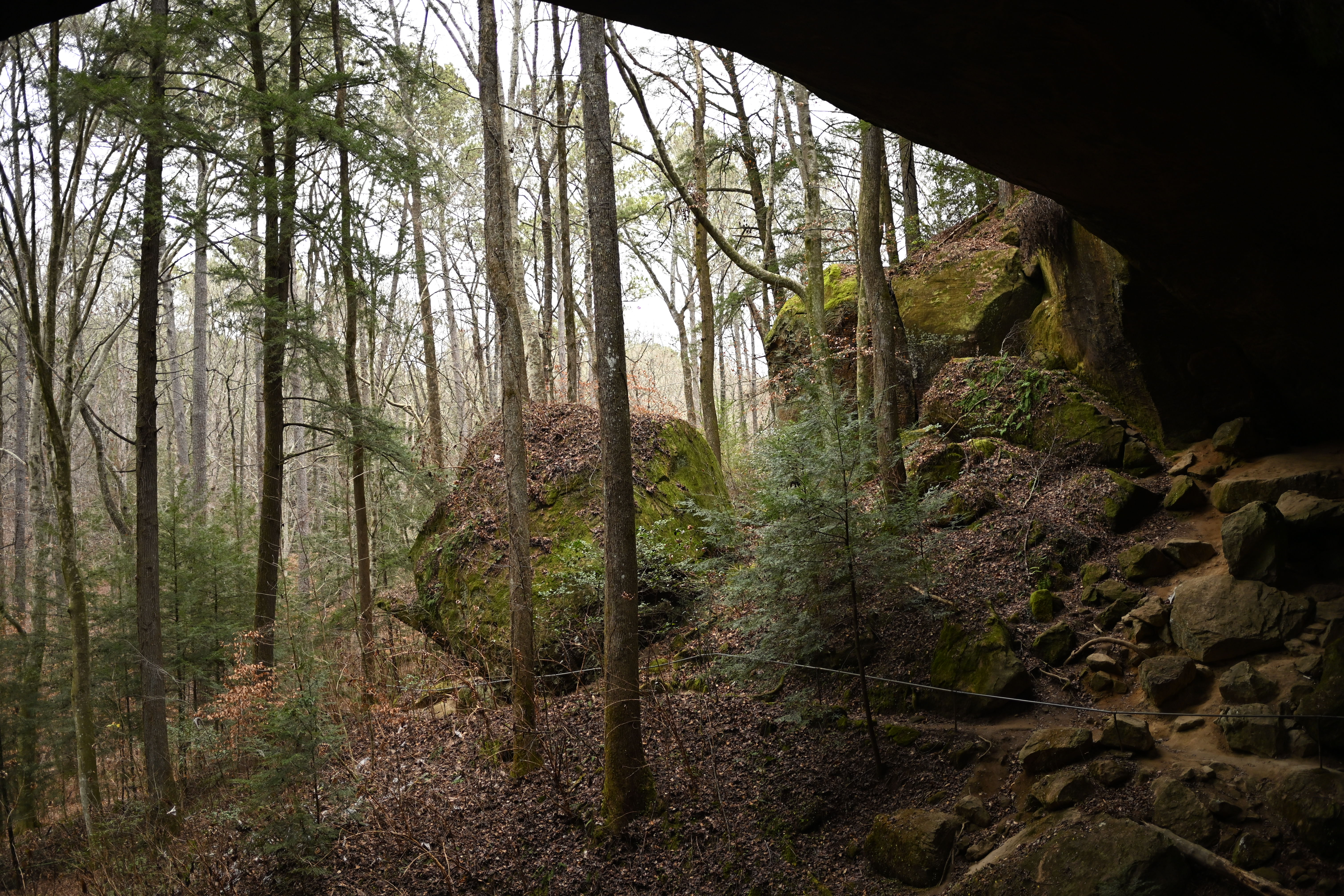
Looking outward, wintertime.

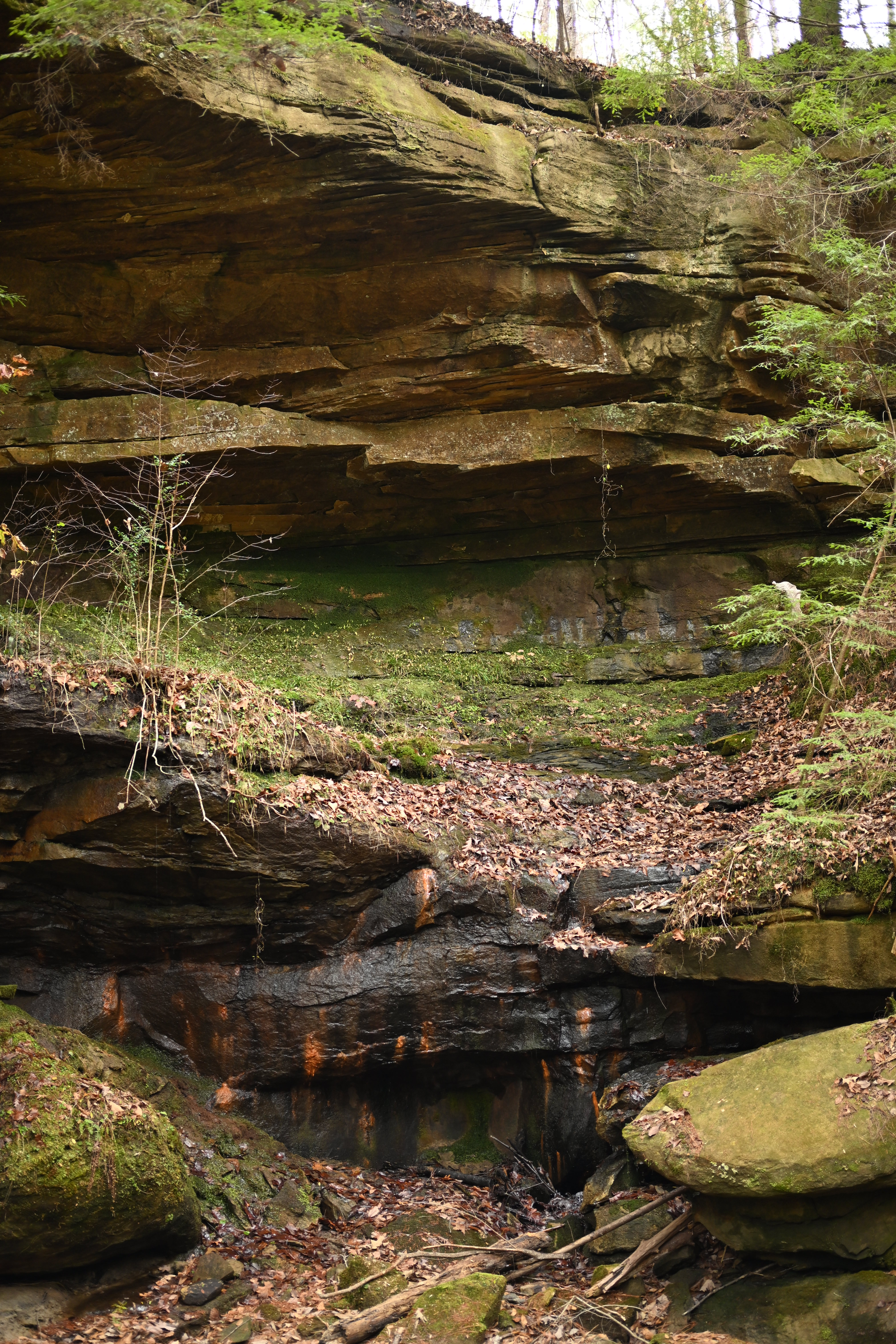
Rock formation visible from the nature trail.

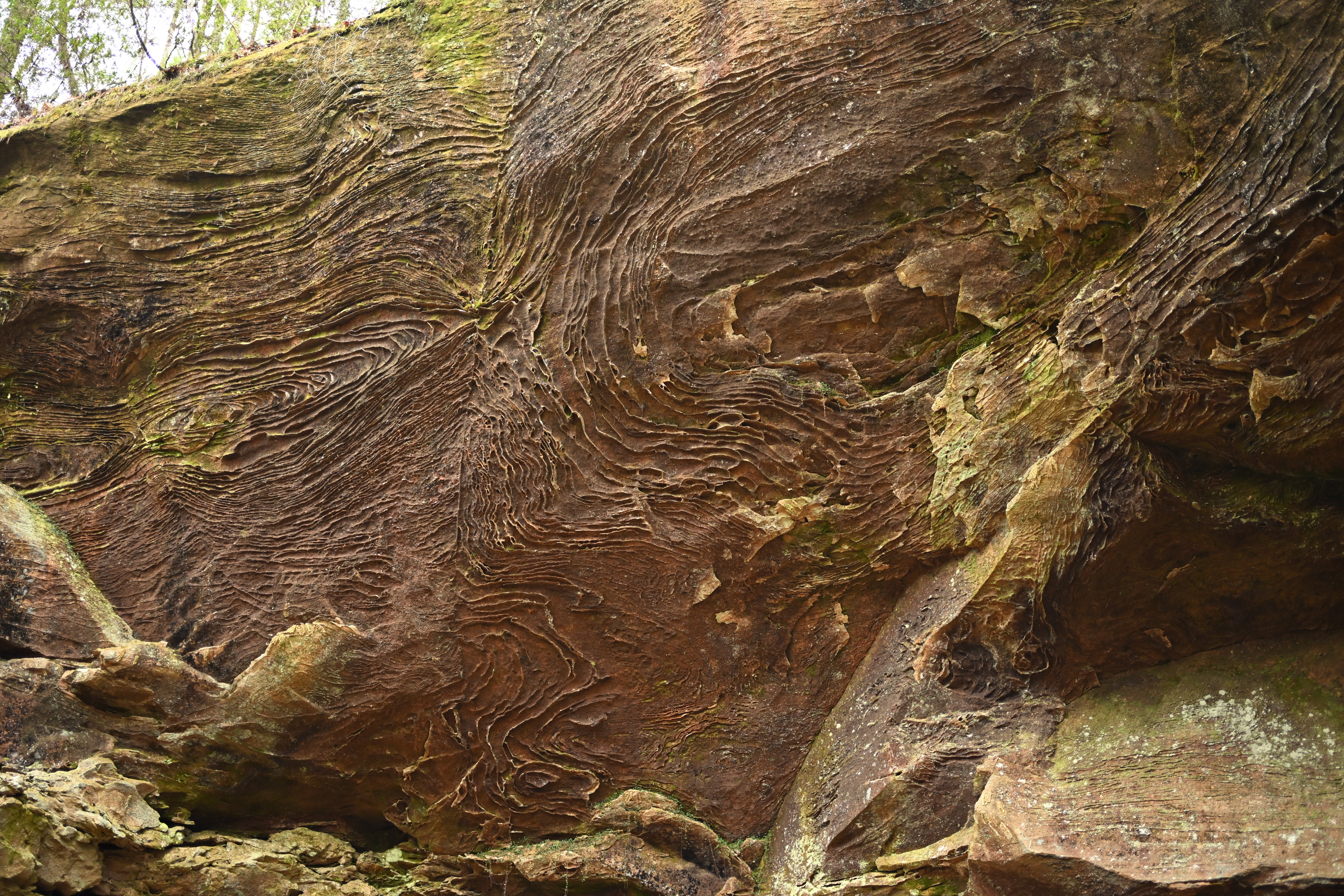
Eroded rock

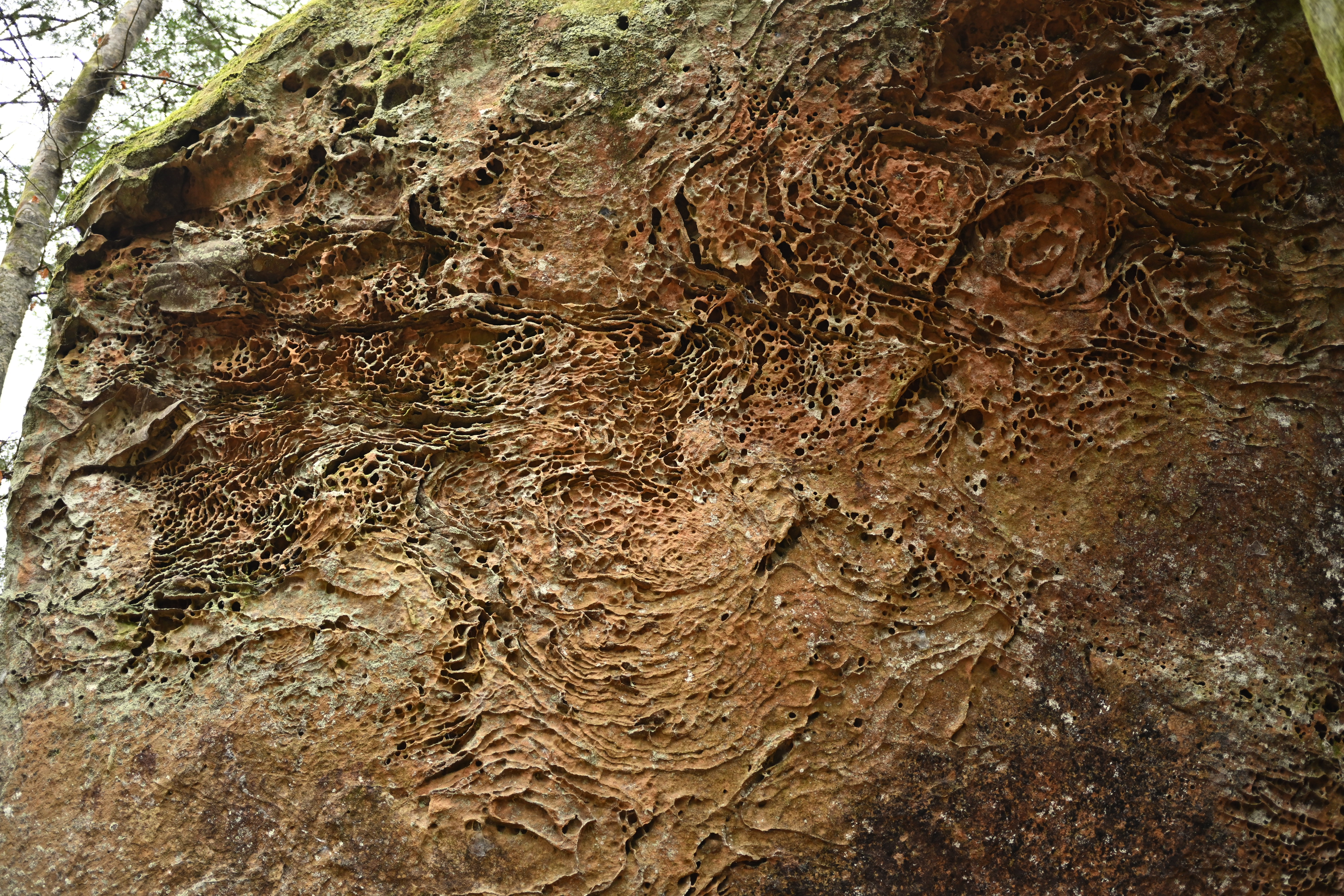
Eroded rock

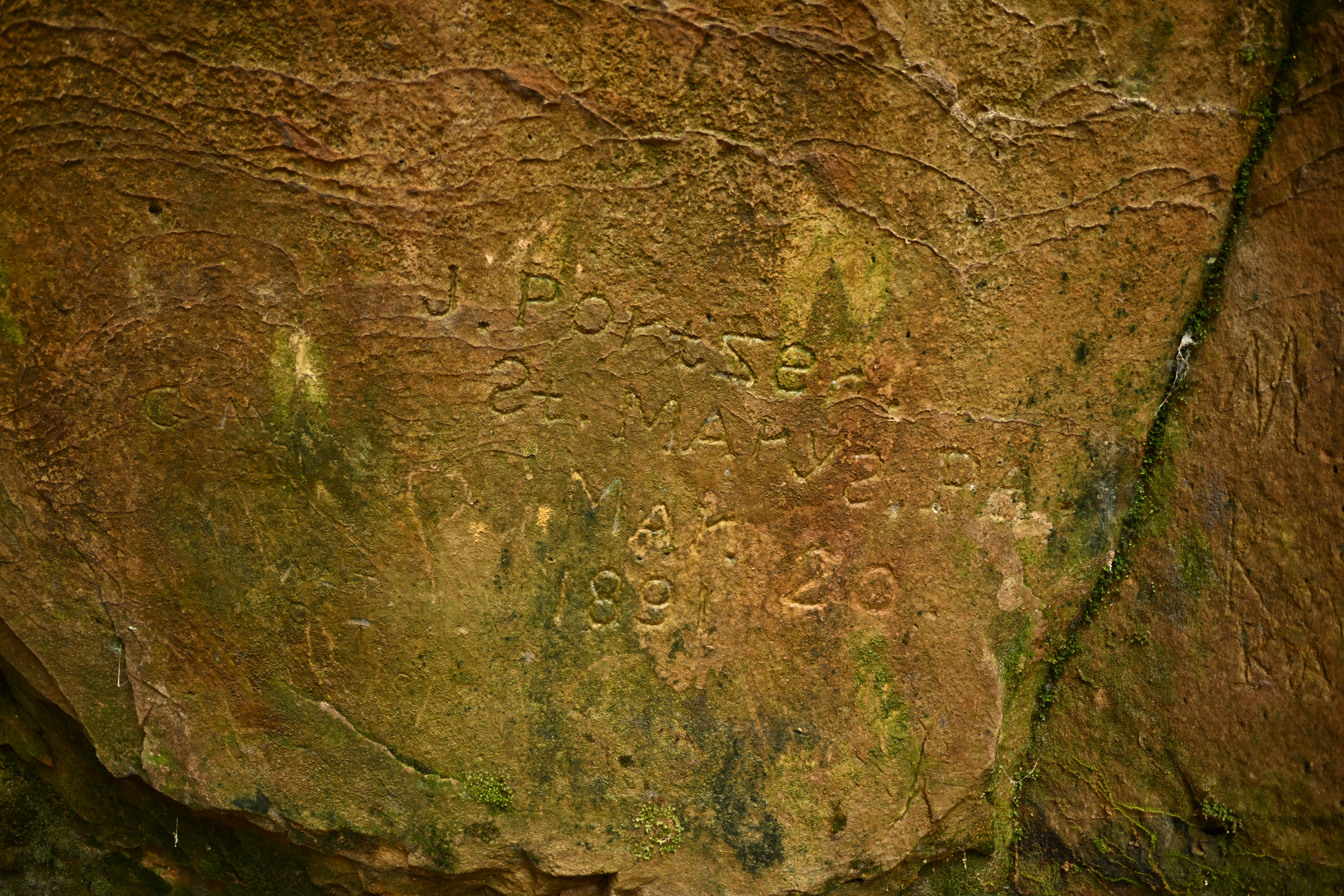
19th-century graffiti
