= Natural Bridge, Alabama =

- Town
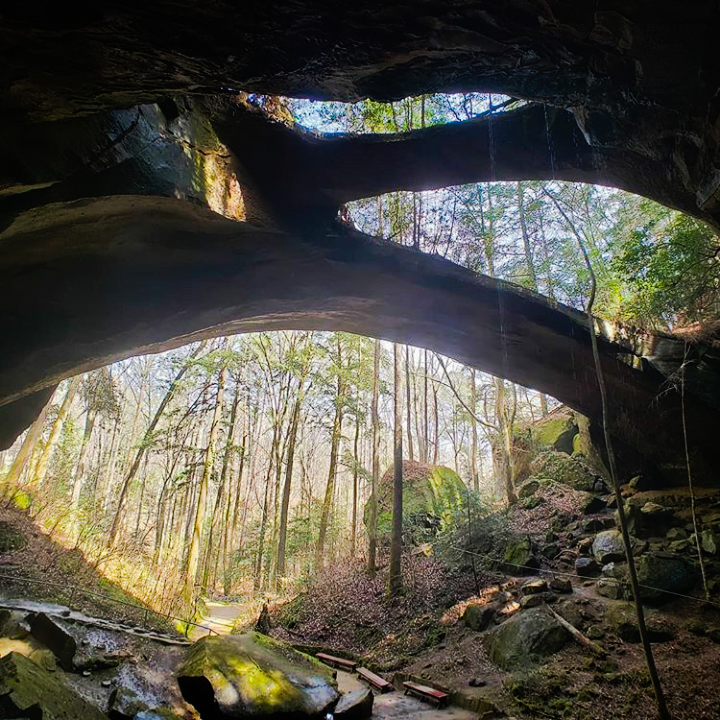

- Location of Natural Bridge in Winston County, Alabama
- Coordinates: 34°05′25″N 87°36′05″W
- Country: United States
- State: Alabama
- County: Winston

Area
  - Total: 0.43 sq mi (1.12 km^{2})
  - Land: 0.43 sq mi (1.12 km^{2})
  - Water: 0 sq mi (0.00 km^{2})
- Elevation: 742 ft (226 m)

Population (2020)
  - Total: 32
  - Density: 73.8/sq mi (28.49/km^{2})
- Time zone: UTC-6 (Central (CST))
  - Summer (DST): UTC-5 (CDT)
- ZIP code: 35577
- Area codes: 205, 659
- FIPS code: 01-53376
- GNIS feature ID: 2406966
- Website: www.naturalbridgeala.com

Natural Bridge is a town at the southwest edge of Winston County, Alabama, United States, located near the intersection of U.S. Route 278, Alabama Highway 13, and Alabama State Route 5. It initially incorporated on September 3, 1914. In the 1930s, due to a dwindling population, its charter became dormant. On July 24, 1997, it reincorporated.

As of the 2020 census, Natural Bridge had a population of 32.

== Description ==
The town is notable for the nearby rock arch, also named Natural Bridge, the longest natural bridge east of the Rockies, spanning over 127 ft (40 m). The arch is in Natural Bridge Park, which allows public access.

== Geography ==
According to the U.S. Census Bureau, the town has a total area of 0.4 square miles (1.0 km^{2}), all land.

== Demographics ==
Historical population
Census	Pop.	Note	%±
1920	335		—
1930	100		−70.1%
2000	28		—
2010	37		32.1%
2020	32		−13.5%
U.S. Decennial Census

=== Racial and ethnic composition ===
Natural Bridge town, Alabama – Racial and ethnic composition Note: the US Census treats Hispanic/Latino as an ethnic category. This table excludes Latinos from the racial categories and assigns them to a separate category. Hispanics/Latinos may be of any race.
Race / Ethnicity (NH = Non-Hispanic)	Pop 2000	Pop 2010	Pop 2020	% 2000	% 2010	% 2020
White alone (NH)	28	37	31	100.00%	100.00%	96.88%
Black or African American alone (NH)	0	0	0	0.00%	0.00%	0.00%
Native American or Alaska Native alone (NH)	0	0	0	0.00%	0.00%	0.00%
Asian alone (NH)	0	0	0	0.00%	0.00%	0.00%
Native Hawaiian or Pacific Islander alone (NH)	0	0	0	0.00%	0.00%	0.00%
Other race alone (NH)	0	0	0	0.00%	0.00%	0.00%
Mixed race or Multiracial (NH)	0	0	1	0.00%	0.00%	3.13%
Hispanic or Latino (any race)	0	0	0	0.00%	0.00%	0.00%
Total	28	37	32	100.00%	100.00%	100.00%

=== 2000 census ===
As of the census of 2000, there were 28 people, 11 households, and 7 families residing in the town. The population density was 66.5 inhabitants per square mile (25.7/km^{2}). There were 14 housing units at an average density of 33.3 per square mile (12.9/km^{2}). The racial makeup of the town was 100.00% White.

There were 11 households, out of which 27.3% had children under the age of 18 living with them, 45.5% were married couples living together, 27.3% had a female householder with no husband present, and 27.3% were non-families. 27.3% of all households were made up of individuals, and 18.2% had someone living alone who was 65 years of age or older. The average household size was 2.55 and the average family size was 2.75.

In the town, the population was spread out, with 25.0% under the age of 18, 7.1% from 18 to 24, 28.6% from 25 to 44, 21.4% from 45 to 64, and 17.9% who were 65 years of age or older. The median age was 40 years. For every 100 females, there were 75.0 males. For every 100 females age 18 and over, there were 61.5 males.

The median income for a household in the town was $11,875, and the median income for a family was $10,625. Males had a median income of $21,250 versus $13,750 for females. The per capita income for the town was $4,619. There were 63.6% of families and 62.2% of the population living below the poverty line, including 66.7% of under eighteens and 71.4% of those over 64.

== See also ==
- List of cities and towns in Alabama
