= Flat Top, Alabama =

Unincorporated community in Alabama, United States

Flat Top, Jefferson County, Alabama
- Unincorporated community
- Location within Alabama Location within the United States
- Coordinates: 33°39′56″N 87°01′25″W
- Country: United States
- State: Alabama
- County: Jefferson
- Elevation: 344 ft (105 m)
- Time zone: UTC-6 (Central (CST))
  - Summer (DST): UTC-5 (CDT)
- Area codes: 205, 659
- GNIS feature ID: 156357

Flat Top is an unincorporated community in Jefferson County, Alabama, United States.

== History ==
A post office called Flattop was established in 1914, and remained in operation until it was discontinued in 1955.
