= Prairie, Alabama =

Unincorporated community in Alabama, United States

- Unincorporated community
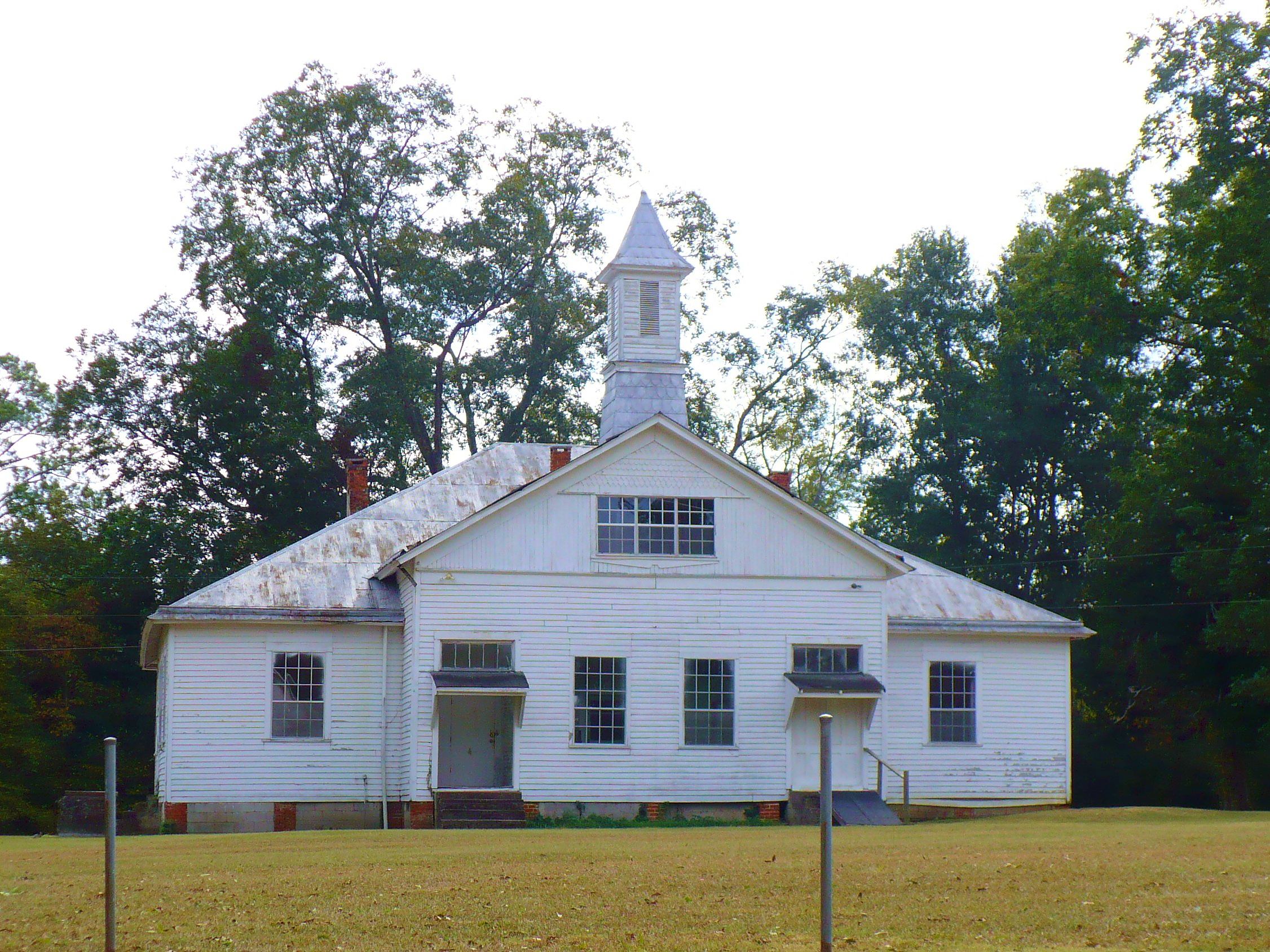
- Prairie Mission school building

- Location within the state of Alabama Prairie, Alabama (the United States)
- Coordinates: 32°9′14″N 87°26′23″W
- Country: United States
- State: Alabama
- County: Wilcox
- Elevation: 161 ft (49 m)
- Time zone: UTC-6 (Central (CST))
  - Summer (DST): UTC-5 (CDT)
- Area code: 334

Prairie is an unincorporated community in Wilcox County, Alabama. Prairie has one site listed on the National Register of Historic Places, the Prairie Mission school.
