= Graysville, Alabama =

City in Alabama, United States

- City
- Location of Graysville in Jefferson County, Alabama.
- Coordinates: 33°39′37″N 86°59′24″W
- Country: United States
- State: Alabama
- County: Jefferson

Area
  - Total: 16.07 sq mi (41.62 km^{2})
  - Land: 16.05 sq mi (41.58 km^{2})
  - Water: 0.012 sq mi (0.03 km^{2})
- Elevation: 518 ft (158 m)

Population (2020)
  - Total: 1,950
  - Density: 121/sq mi (46.9/km^{2})
- Time zone: UTC-6 (Central (CST))
  - Summer (DST): UTC-5 (CDT)
- ZIP code: 35073
- Area codes: 205 & 659
- FIPS code: 01-31384
- GNIS feature ID: 2403734
- Website: graysvillecity.com

Graysville is a city in northwestern Jefferson County, Alabama, United States, located north of Adamsville. At the 2020 census, the population was 1,950.

== History ==
In the late 1800s and early 1900s, this city was called Gin Town. Because it had the only cotton gin for miles around, the community grew. It incorporated as Graysville initially in 1897. As the town grew, the need for businesses and houses of worship grew as well. One street over from this site, the Union Church was established in the early 1900s. All people of all denominations met and worshiped there as it was the only church for miles around. In 1927, the town charter was revoked on the grounds of "inactivity."

This city was reincorporated on November 17, 1945. The first meeting of the town council took place at the old school house on January 16, 1946. Later that year, the original city council established the Graysville Water Works system. In 1949, the city council established the Graysville Gas Board which eventually became the Graysville Municipal Gas System. During the 1950s and 1960s, the local coal mines and steel mills attracted families from all over Alabama. As a result of this growth, Graysville established the city's first series of home developments and subdivisions. During the 1980s and 1990s, Graysville expanded its city limits by annexing multiple acres in what was then unincorporated in Jefferson County.

Its communities were damaged by an EF3 tornado on January 23, 2012.

== Geography ==
According to the U.S. Census Bureau, the city has a total area of 6.3 square miles (16 km^{2}), all land.

== Demographics ==
Historical population
Census	Pop.	Note	%±
1900	319		—
1910	428		34.2%
1930	244		—
1950	879		—
1960	2,870		226.5%
1970	3,182		10.9%
1980	2,642		−17.0%
1990	2,241		−15.2%
2000	2,344		4.6%
2010	2,165		−7.6%
2020	1,950		−9.9%
U.S. Decennial Census; 2013 Estimate

=== Racial and ethnic composition ===
Graysville city, Alabama – Racial and ethnic composition Note: the US Census treats Hispanic/Latino as an ethnic category. This table excludes Latinos from the racial categories and assigns them to a separate category. Hispanics/Latinos may be of any race.
Race / Ethnicity (NH = Non-Hispanic)	Pop 1980	Pop 1990	Pop 2000	Pop 2010	Pop 2020	% 1980	% 1990	% 2000	% 2010	% 2020
White alone (NH)	1,718	1,552	1,759	1,575	1,262	65.03%	69.25%	75.04%	72.75%	64.72%
Black or African American alone (NH)	924	680	542	510	536	34.97%	30.34%	23.12%	23.56%	27.49%
Native American or Alaska Native alone (NH)	0	1	10	9	6	0.00%	0.04%	0.43%	0.42%	0.31%
Asian alone (NH)	0	4	8	4	7	0.00%	0.18%	0.34%	0.18%	0.36%
Native Hawaiian or Pacific Islander alone (NH)	x	x	0	1	2	x	x	0.00%	0.05%	0.10%
Other race alone (NH)	0	1	0	1	2	0.00%	0.04%	0.00%	0.05%	0.10%
Mixed race or Multiracial (NH)	x	x	14	28	71	x	x	0.60%	1.29%	3.64%
Hispanic or Latino (any race)	0	3	11	37	64	0.00%	0.13%	0.47%	1.71%	3.28%
Total	2,642	2,241	2,344	2,165	1,950	100.00%	100.00%	100.00%	100.00%	100.00%

=== 2020 census ===
As of the 2020 census, Graysville had a population of 1,950, 860 households, and 542 families. The median age was 47.1 years. 17.7% of residents were under the age of 18 and 22.2% of residents were 65 years of age or older. For every 100 females there were 95.8 males, and for every 100 females age 18 and over there were 94.7 males age 18 and over.

86.7% of residents lived in urban areas, while 13.3% lived in rural areas.

There were 860 households in Graysville, of which 24.7% had children under the age of 18 living in them. Of all households, 37.1% were married-couple households, 21.3% were households with a male householder and no spouse or partner present, and 34.2% were households with a female householder and no spouse or partner present. About 34.5% of all households were made up of individuals and 16.1% had someone living alone who was 65 years of age or older.

There were 1,007 housing units, of which 14.6% were vacant. The homeowner vacancy rate was 0.5% and the rental vacancy rate was 8.7%.

=== 2010 census ===
At the 2010 census, there were 2,165 people, 907 households, and 607 families living in the city. The population density was 343.7 inhabitants per square mile (132.7/km^{2}). There were 1,066 housing units at an average density of 169.2 per square mile (65.3/km^{2}). The racial makeup of the city was 73.9% White, 23.6% Black or African American, 0.4% Native American, 0.2% Asian, 0.4% from other races, and 1.4% from two or more races. 1.7% of the population were Hispanic or Latino of any race.

Of the 907 households 20.7% had children under the age of 18 living with them, 47.0% were married couples living together, 14.7% had a female householder with no husband present, and 33.1% were non-families. 30.2% of households were one person and 12.6% were one person aged 65 or older. The average household size was 2.39 and the average family size was 2.93.

The age distribution was 20.3% under the age of 18, 7.1% from 18 to 24, 24.0% from 25 to 44, 28.7% from 45 to 64, and 19.9% 65 or older. The median age was 44.3 years. For every 100 females, there were 93.8 males. For every 100 females age 18 and over, there were 97.0 males.

The median household income was $35,750 and the median family income was $44,926. Males had a median income of $37,156 versus $30,917 for females. The per capita income for the city was $16,308. About 15.9% of families and 20.1% of the population were below the poverty line, including 21.5% of those under age 18 and 13.0% of those age 65 or over.

=== 2000 census ===
At the 2000 census, there were 2,344 people, 976 households, and 696 families living in the city. The population density was 373.1 inhabitants per square mile (144.1/km^{2}). There were 1,090 housing units at an average density of 173.5 per square mile (67.0/km^{2}). The racial makeup of the city was 75.26% White, 23.12% Black or African American, 0.43% Native American, 0.34% Asian, 0.17% from other races, and 0.68% from two or more races. 0.47% of the population were Hispanic or Latino of any race.

Of the 976 households 24.6% had children under the age of 18 living with them, 50.3% were married couples living together, 16.7% had a female householder with no husband present, and 28.6% were non-families. 25.7% of households were one person and 14.0% were one person aged 65 or older. The average household size was 2.40 and the average family size was 2.85.

The age distribution was 20.9% under the age of 18, 8.2% from 18 to 24, 25.0% from 25 to 44, 25.4% from 45 to 64, and 20.4% 65 or older. The median age was 42 years. For every 100 females, there were 86.2 males. For every 100 females age 18 and over, there were 83.0 males.

The median household income was $30,994 and the median family income was $35,938. Males had a median income of $30,692 versus $25,446 for females. The per capita income for the city was $16,328. About 8.2% of families and 11.3% of the population were below the poverty line, including 16.5% of those under age 18 and 13.2% of those age 65 or over.
