= George Paul Kornegay =

American painter (1913–2014)

George Kornegay (left) and exhibits

George Paul Kornegay (November 23, 1913 – June 3, 2014) was an American folk and outsider artist, and minister in the African Methodist Episcopal Zion Church, who created a large Christian visionary environment with found objects near Brent, Alabama.

== Early life and career ==
Kornegay was born on 23 November 1913 in Bibb County, Alabama, the second of ten children of Will and Sue Kornegay. His father worked as a farmer, miner, and barrel maker, and his mother looked after their children. Kornegay attended the Alabama Mission School in Brent until the tenth grade, but had to leave school and help his father in sharecropping.

His father later bought 28 acres of land near Brent, Alabama and a two-story house from a Cherokee, Charles Hogan, for $100. The property was situated on a Native American burial ground and Kornegay recounted that his daughter could "hear voices out here talking but she can't tell us what they're talking about. This is one of them places where you can come when you're feeling bad and go away lifted up. They all say this is a sacred place."

Kornegay worked at a steel mill, Century Foundry, in Tuscaloosa and later described his working life as "From a plow to a preacher, from a preacher to a steel mill, from a steel mill to a veneer mill. Double shifts I worked. And a cotton sack, and a plow, and a saw mill, and a paper mill, and all that stuff: had to make a living for my people".

== Marriage and religious calling ==
Kornegay married Minnie Sue Tubbs on August 9, 1932, and they had 12 children; eight boys (Arthur Paul, George Jr., Earvin, Arthur Lee, Joel, Benjamin, Donald, and Ronnie) and four girls (Gloria Jean, Dorothy, Donna, and Annie). He felt a "divine calling" to become a minister and said that at first he was "...afraid of it, but God, he stayed at me. I ask him to give me these signs if this is what he mean for me. And he sent them. And the end of it come from a choir of angels come to visit my house. Come from the east into the house, go down the hall, go around my bedroom. And then leave to the west". Kornegay spent many years as a minister in the African Methodist Episcopal Zion Church (A.M.E. Zion), where he was affectionately known as "Big Daddy". Kornegay preached in the A.M.E. Zion churches at Grove Hill, Cottage Hill and Marietta for over fifty years.

== Art practice ==
In 1960, Kornegay began to create a large narrative artwork (or "visionary environment") on a two acre site on a hill near his house using paintings, found objects and sculpture, but only worked full time on the project after his retirement in 1980. Kornegay gave several names to his visionary environment including The New Jerusalem, Seven Holy Mountains, Art Hill, and the Sacred Mountain.

He had been inspired to create the work after a dream in which a vision from God told him that he would be better able to communicate his religious messages this way. Kornegay had originally intended to sculpt a face onto a red rock but he felt compelled not to and was told to "Say, Upon this rock I'll build my church the gates of hell shall not prevail against it. I'll give you the key to the kingdom but what you find on earth shall he found in heaven, what you loosen on earth shall he loose in heaven, and this was my beginning. I love this because this is the beginning, and all of this is going to have an end". Having only intended to sculpt the rock, Kornegay was told by God to "Go further" and he asked God to "Tell me how when I get up in the morning". The next day he was compelled to "Put a piece here, put a piece there, put a piece over yonder. Go back and get that; never throw nothing away...So I fixed it up his way. I spaced it, you know, with the eye God give me. Everything got a place. I told them, "I can see more with my eyes closed than they can see with their eyes open." So God gave it to me, and I'm going to use it till I die".

Themes in Kornegay's artwork included his Native American ancestry, African traditions, and apocalyptic Christian visions and passages from the Bible, including the Last Supper and several crucifixions. Kornegay's African heritage was reflected in his creation of bottle trees and objects reminiscent of spiritual Nkisi. He was interviewed by William Arnett for Arnett's Souls Grown Deep Foundation in 1997 and 1998. Arnett made a gentleman's agreement with Kornegay for him to keep his artistic creation in situ, and not to sell to collectors. Arnett photographed the collection before its dispersal. Kornegay died a centenarian on 3 June 2014; he was predeceased by his wife, and his daughter Donna Lee, and survived by his 11 children, 30 grandchildren, and 45 great-grandchildren.
