= Kimbrough, Alabama =

Unincorporated community in Alabama, United States

- Unincorporated community
- Location within the state of Alabama Kimbrough, Alabama (the United States)
- Coordinates: 32°2′0″N 87°33′54″W
- Country: United States
- State: Alabama
- County: Wilcox
- Elevation: 92 ft (28 m)
- Time zone: UTC-6 (Central (CST))
  - Summer (DST): UTC-5 (CDT)
- ZIP code: 36722, 36769
- Area code: 334

Kimbrough is an unincorporated community in Wilcox County, Alabama, United States, located near Pine Hill on State Route 5.

== Geography ==
Kimbrough is located at 32.03348°N 87.56527°W and has an elevation of 92 feet (28 m).
