= Caffee Junction, Alabama =

- Unincorporated community
- Location within Alabama Location within the United States
- Coordinates: 33°13′43″N 87°08′16″W
- Country: United States
- State: Alabama
- County: Tuscaloosa
- Elevation: 653 ft (199 m)
- Time zone: UTC-6 (Central (CST))
  - Summer (DST): UTC-5 (CDT)
- Area codes: 205, 659
- GNIS feature ID: 158836

Caffee Junction, also known as Coffey Junction, Greeley, Martaban, and Rickey, is an unincorporated community in Tuscaloosa County, Alabama, United States. Caffee Junction is located along U.S. Route 11, 4.1 miles (6.6 km) north-northeast of Woodstock.

== History ==
The community was originally known as Greeley for the Horace Greeley school located there. A post office operated under the name Rickey from 1902 to 1904, and under the name Greeley from 1904 to 1929. The Tennessee Coal, Iron and Railroad Company operated an iron ore mine in Caffee Junction.
