= Murder of Willie Edwards =

1957 murder by the Ku Klux Klan in Alabama

Willie Edwards
- Born: Willie Edwards Jr. November 13, 1932; Lowndes County, Alabama
- Died: January 23, 1957 (aged 24); Tyler-Goodwyn Bridge; Alabama River, Montgomery County, Alabama
- Cause of death: Racially motivated murder by Ku Klux Klan members

Willie Edwards Jr. (November 13, 1932 – January 23, 1957) was a 24-year-old black American, husband and father, who was murdered by members of the Alabama Ku Klux Klan. He is buried at New Pleasant Valley Cemetery in Letohatchee, Alabama.

== Murder ==
On the night of January 22, 1957, a small group of Klansmen gathered armed with pistols and a rifle. They got into a car to search for Edwards, who had recently been hired as a driver for Winn-Dixie and whom they suspected was sleeping with a white woman. Edwards had left work but an hour later received a call from his supervisor asking to return as one of the other workers had called in sick. Edwards left for work on the afternoon of January 23, never to return home. It is suspected he was abducted and beaten by the Klansmen as they drove him around Montgomery. While stopped at the Tyler-Goodwin Bridge, along the Alabama River near Montgomery, they pointed a gun at Edwards commanding him to leap from the height. He fell 125 feet (38.1 m) to his death. Three months passed before his body was discovered washed up on the shores of the river. Officials stated that decomposition made it impossible to determine the cause of his death.

== Case reopened ==
In 1976, then State Attorney General Bill Baxley re-opened the Edwards case. Three people were arrested and charged with first degree murder: Sonny Kyle Livingston Jr. (38), Henry Alexander (46), and James York (73). A fourth man involved in the lynching, Raymond Britt Jr., broke the long silence with his affidavit in exchange for immunity dated February 20, 1976. In the statement to Attorney General Bill Baxley, Britt described how on the night of January 23, 1957, he along with three other men beat and forced Edwards to jump off the Tyler-Goodwin Bridge into the Alabama River. Alabama Judge Frank Embry, however, dismissed the charges, in spite of Britt's sworn testimony, because no cause of death was ever established. He concluded that "merely forcing a person to jump from a bridge does not naturally and probably lead to the death of such person."

In 1997, Edwards's daughter, Malinda, requested the District Attorney, Ellen Brooks, to re-investigate her father's death. The District Attorney agreed and began working with the new medical examiner, Dr. James Lauridson. It was determined that Edwards's death was caused by a forced jump into the Alabama River in 1957. Therefore, Edwards's cause of death was changed from unknown to homicide. In 1999, the District Attorney presented the new case before a Montgomery County Grand Jury, which subsequently affirmed that Edwards's death was indeed caused by the KKK, but declined to indict anyone specifically of the crime.

== See also ==
- List of solved missing person cases: 1950–1999
- List of unsolved murders (1900–1979)
