= Sprott, Alabama =

Unincorporated community in Brownsville, Alabama

- Unincorporated community
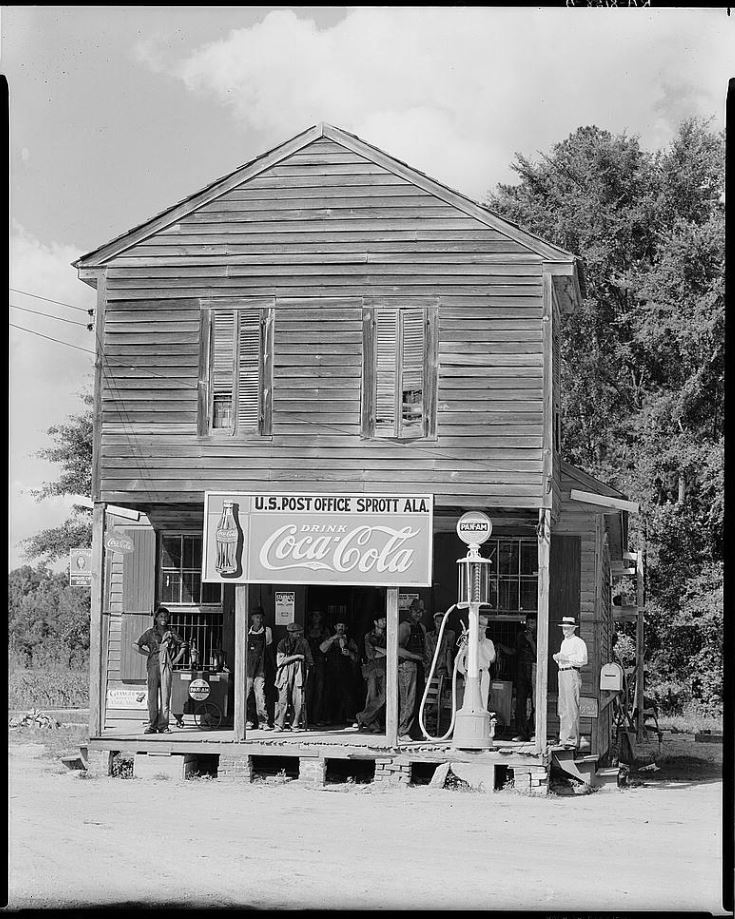
- Crossroads store and post office in Sprott as photographed by Walker Evans for the Farm Security Administration

- Location of Sprott in Alabama
- Coordinates: 32°40′36″N 87°13′17″W
- Country: United States
- State: Alabama
- County: Perry
- Elevation: 177 ft (54 m)
- Time zone: UTC-6 (Central (CST))
  - Summer (DST): UTC-5 (CDT)
- ZIP code: 36756
- Area code: 334
- FIPS code: 01-01105
- GNIS feature ID: 160662

Sprott is an unincorporated community in Perry County, Alabama, United States. It is located at the intersection of Alabama Highways 14, and 183, northeast of Marion.

A 1930s view of the USPO/crossroads store by Walker Evans, albeit without showing persons, was used as title cover of the 2003 musical record Rural Renewal by the band The Crusaders.

== Notable person ==
- J. Hugh Nichols, County Executive of Howard County, Maryland from 1978 to 1986
