= Heiberger, Alabama =

Unincorporated community in Brownsville, Alabama

Heiberger
- Unincorporated community
- Location in Alabama.
- Coordinates: 32°45′29″N 87°17′12″W
- Country: United States
- State: Alabama
- County: Perry
- Elevation: 200 ft (61 m)
- Time zone: UTC-6 (Central (CST))
  - Summer (DST): UTC-5 (CDT)
- Area code: 334
- GNIS feature ID: 159751

Heiberger is a small unincorporated community located about 10 miles north of Marion in Perry County, Alabama, United States. It is best known for being the birthplace of civil rights leader Coretta Scott King.
