= Brent, Alabama =

City in Alabama, United States

Brent
- City
- Flag Seal Logo
- Motto: Proven by Tempest
- Location of Brent in Bibb County, Alabama.
- Coordinates: 32°56′24″N 87°10′29″W
- Country: United States
- State: Alabama
- County: Bibb

Government
  - Mayor: Bobbie White

Area
  - Total: 8.83 sq mi (22.87 km^{2})
  - Land: 8.80 sq mi (22.79 km^{2})
  - Water: 0.031 sq mi (0.08 km^{2})
- Elevation: 240 ft (73 m)

Population (2020)
  - Total: 2,972
  - Density: 337.7/sq mi (130.38/km^{2})
- Time zone: UTC-6 (Central (CST))
  - Summer (DST): UTC-5 (CDT)
- ZIP code: 35034
- Area codes: 205, 659
- FIPS code: 01-09136
- GNIS feature ID: 0159248
- Website: www.cityofbrentalabama.com

Brent is a city in Bibb County, Alabama, United States. At the 2020 census, the population was 2,972.

== History ==
Brent was founded in 1898 along the Gulf, Mobile & Ohio Railroad line in the southern portion of Bibb County, named after surveyor Brent H. Armstrong. The community was incorporated in 1913.

On May 27, 1973, Brent was almost completely destroyed by an F4 tornado during an outbreak of violent weather in the Deep South, killing 5 people and injuring 56 in the area. The tornado was on the ground for 139 miles (224 km), currently the longest track to date in Alabama history, beginning just northeast of Demopolis in Hale County and eventually dissipating at Cheaha Mountain in Clay County. Adjacent Centreville received significant damage as well as locations in nearby counties. Brent was able to be rebuilt before being hit by another EF3 on March 25, 2021 which also damaged the adjacent town of Centreville. The tornado struck the Bibb County Airport rendering the airport a total loss.

== Geography ==
Brent is located near the center of Bibb County at 32°56'24.864" North, 87°10'29.935" West (32.940240, -87.174982). It lies in the Cahaba River valley and is adjacent to the city of Centreville, the county seat, which is across the Cahaba River from the city. U.S. Route 82 passes through the northern part of town, bypassing the town center, and leads northwest 32 miles (51 km) to Tuscaloosa and southeast 73 miles (117 km) to Montgomery, the state capital.

According to the U.S. Census Bureau, Brent has a total area of 8.8 square miles (22.8 km^{2}), of which 8.8 square miles (22.7 km^{2}) is land and 0.039 square miles (0.1 km^{2}), or 0.34%, is water.

=== Climate ===
The climate in this area is characterized by hot, humid summers and generally mild to cool winters. According to the Köppen Climate Classification system, Brent has a humid subtropical climate, abbreviated "Cfa" on climate maps.

Climate data for Brent, 1991–2020 simulated normals (282 ft elevation)
| Month | Jan | Feb | Mar | Apr | May | Jun | Jul | Aug | Sep | Oct | Nov | Dec | Year |
|---|---|---|---|---|---|---|---|---|---|---|---|---|---|
| Mean daily maximum °F (°C) | 55.9 (13.3) | 60.6 (15.9) | 68.9 (20.5) | 76.5 (24.7) | 83.7 (28.7) | 89.8 (32.1) | 92.3 (33.5) | 91.9 (33.3) | 87.6 (30.9) | 77.7 (25.4) | 66.6 (19.2) | 58.3 (14.6) | 75.8 (24.3) |
| Daily mean °F (°C) | 44.8 (7.1) | 48.6 (9.2) | 55.8 (13.2) | 63.1 (17.3) | 71.4 (21.9) | 78.6 (25.9) | 81.3 (27.4) | 80.8 (27.1) | 75.7 (24.3) | 64.9 (18.3) | 53.6 (12.0) | 47.3 (8.5) | 63.8 (17.7) |
| Mean daily minimum °F (°C) | 33.6 (0.9) | 36.5 (2.5) | 42.6 (5.9) | 49.6 (9.8) | 59.2 (15.1) | 67.3 (19.6) | 70.5 (21.4) | 69.8 (21.0) | 63.9 (17.7) | 52.0 (11.1) | 40.6 (4.8) | 36.3 (2.4) | 51.8 (11.0) |
| Average precipitation inches (mm) | 5.45 (138.42) | 5.74 (145.75) | 5.43 (137.81) | 4.99 (126.69) | 3.92 (99.57) | 4.58 (116.23) | 4.66 (118.42) | 4.23 (107.36) | 4.11 (104.39) | 3.17 (80.45) | 4.60 (116.81) | 5.34 (135.52) | 56.22 (1,427.42) |
| Average dew point °F (°C) | 35.8 (2.1) | 38.5 (3.6) | 43.7 (6.5) | 51.4 (10.8) | 60.8 (16.0) | 68.2 (20.1) | 71.2 (21.8) | 70.5 (21.4) | 65.3 (18.5) | 54.9 (12.7) | 44.1 (6.7) | 39.2 (4.0) | 53.6 (12.0) |
Source: Prism Climate Group

== Demographics ==
Historical population
| Census | Pop. | Note | %± |
|---|---|---|---|
| 1920 | 386 | | — |
| 1930 | 586 | | 51.8% |
| 1940 | 829 | | 41.5% |
| 1950 | 1,100 | | 32.7% |
| 1960 | 1,879 | | 70.8% |
| 1970 | 2,093 | | 11.4% |
| 1980 | 2,862 | | 36.7% |
| 1990 | 2,776 | | −3.0% |
| 2000 | 4,024 | | 45.0% |
| 2010 | 4,947 | | 22.9% |
| 2020 | 2,972 | | −39.9% |
U.S. Decennial Census; 2013 Estimate

=== Racial and ethnic composition ===
Brent city, Alabama – Racial and ethnic composition Note: the US Census treats Hispanic/Latino as an ethnic category. This table excludes Latinos from the racial categories and assigns them to a separate category. Hispanics/Latinos may be of any race.
| Race / Ethnicity (NH = Non-Hispanic) | Pop 1980 | Pop 1990 | Pop 2000 | Pop 2010 | Pop 2020 | % 1980 | % 1990 | % 2000 | % 2010 | % 2020 |
|---|---|---|---|---|---|---|---|---|---|---|
| White alone (NH) | 1,653 | 1,634 | 1,963 | 2,158 | 1,507 | 57.76% | 58.86% | 48.78% | 43.62% | 50.71% |
| Black or African American alone (NH) | 1,206 | 1,129 | 2,003 | 2,639 | 1,286 | 42.14% | 40.67% | 49.78% | 53.35% | 43.27% |
| Native American or Alaska Native alone (NH) | 0 | 2 | 3 | 7 | 2 | 0.00% | 0.07% | 0.07% | 0.14% | 0.07% |
| Asian alone (NH) | 3 | 0 | 8 | 0 | 4 | 0.10% | 0.00% | 0.20% | 0.00% | 0.13% |
| Native Hawaiian or Pacific Islander alone (NH) | x | x | 0 | 5 | 0 | x | x | 0.00% | 0.10% | 0.00% |
| Other race alone (NH) | 0 | 0 | 0 | 4 | 2 | 0.00% | 0.00% | 0.00% | 0.08% | 0.07% |
| Mixed race or Multiracial (NH) | x | x | 8 | 29 | 75 | x | x | 0.20% | 0.59% | 2.52% |
| Hispanic or Latino (any race) | 0 | 11 | 39 | 105 | 96 | 0.00% | 0.40% | 0.97% | 2.12% | 3.23% |
| Total | 2,862 | 2,776 | 4,024 | 4,947 | 2,972 | 100.00% | 100.00% | 100.00% | 100.00% | 100.00% |

=== 2020 census ===
As of the 2020 census, Brent had a population of 2,972 and 1,109 households; the city contained 762 families. The median age was 39.9 years. 20.9% of residents were under the age of 18 and 15.6% of residents were 65 years of age or older. For every 100 females there were 109.0 males, and for every 100 females age 18 and over there were 112.0 males age 18 and over.

0.0% of residents lived in urban areas, while 100.0% lived in rural areas.

There were 1,109 households in Brent, of which 30.2% had children under the age of 18 living in them. Of all households, 35.1% were married-couple households, 19.2% were households with a male householder and no spouse or partner present, and 40.6% were households with a female householder and no spouse or partner present. About 35.1% of all households were made up of individuals and 14.8% had someone living alone who was 65 years of age or older.

There were 1,262 housing units, of which 12.1% were vacant. The homeowner vacancy rate was 2.0% and the rental vacancy rate was 5.6%.

=== 2010 census ===
As of the census of 2010, there were 4,947 people, 1,178 households, and 788 families residing in the city. The population density was 564 inhabitants per square mile (218/km^{2}). There were 1,323 housing units at an average density of 150.3 per square mile (58.0/km^{2}). The racial makeup of the city was 53.5% Black or African American, 45.1% White, 0.1% Native American, 0.0% Asian, 0.5% from other races, and 0.6% from two or more races. 2.1% of the population were Hispanic or Latino of any race.

There were 1,178 households, out of which 30.5% had children under the age of 18 living with them, 38.9% were married couples living together, 23.6% had a female householder with no husband present, and 33.1% were non-families. 30.7% of all households were made up of individuals, and 12.0% had someone living alone who was 65 years of age or older. The average household size was 2.47 and the average family size was 3.10.

In the city, the population was spread out, with 15.6% under the age of 18, 10.3% from 18 to 24, 39.4% from 25 to 44, 25.8% from 45 to 64, and 8.9% who were 65 years of age or older. The median age was 36.2 years. For every 100 females, there were 209.2 males. For every 100 females age 18 and over, there were 278.8 males.

The median income for a household in the city was $35,044, and the median income for a family was $42,440. Males had a median income of $43,211 versus $22,010 for females. The per capita income for the city was $16,799. About 14.9% of families and 18.6% of the population were below the poverty line, including 25.1% of those under age 18 and 38.4% of those age 65 or over.

== Government ==
Brent is governed via the mayor-council system. The city council consists of five members each elected from single member districts. The mayor, currently Bobbie White, is elected by the entire city.

The Alabama Department of Corrections operates the Bibb Correctional Facility in Brent.

The United States Postal Service operates the Brent Post Office.

== Transportation ==
Intercity bus service is provided by Greyhound Lines.

== Notable people ==
- Charles Cleveland, former professional basketball player for the Philadelphia 76ers
- The visionary art environment of outsider artist and Methodist minister George Paul Kornegay was based on a hill near Brent.
