= Vineland, Alabama =

Unincorporated community in Alabama, United States

- Unincorporated community
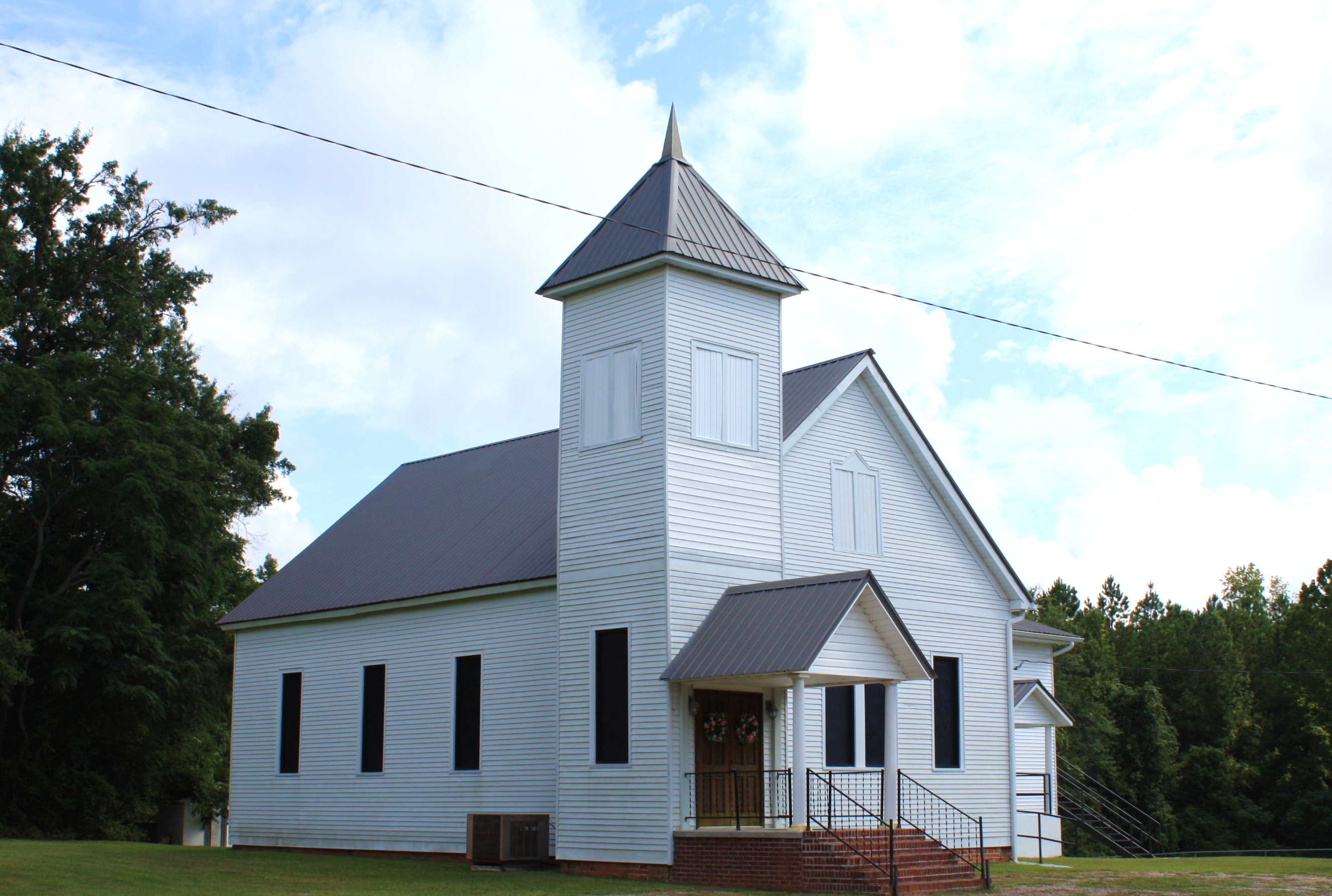
- Vineland Baptist Church in 2009

- Location within the state of Alabama Vineland (the United States)
- Coordinates: 32°2′8.52″N 87°39′33.98″W
- Country: United States
- State: Alabama
- County: Marengo
- Elevation: 148 ft (45 m)
- Time zone: UTC-6 (Central (CST))
  - Summer (DST): UTC-5 (CDT)
- ZIP code: 36784
- Area code: 334

Vineland is an unincorporated community in the southeastern corner of Marengo County, Alabama, United States. Vineland had several stores, a cotton gin, and Baptist and Methodist churches. It also had a post office from 1887 to 1916, with Julius A. Kimbrough serving as the first postmaster and Solomon S. Strickland as the last. This general area, which also included Surginer and Hampden, was originally known as Pineville Precinct. Pineville was also an early name for Putnam, in the southwestern corner of the county.

Early settlers of the Pineville Precinct who were still present by the outbreak of the American Civil War included the Agee, Anderson, Allen, Autry, Carson, Corgill, Cowen, Deloach, Downey, Drinkard, Evans, Fontaine, Gibson, Green, Hall, Harper, Hasty, Hawkins, Jackson, Jordan, Kimbrough, Lockett, Loftin, McClure, Marion, Moore, Newton, Pope, Porter, Pritchett, Proctor, Reed, Sims, Smyly, Swearingen, Thompson, Twilley, Williams, Weatherly, White, and Woodward families.

== Geography ==
Vineland is located at 32.03570°N 87.65944°W and has an elevation of 148 feet (45 m).
