= Clay Hill =

Clay Hill or Clayhill may refer to:

== Places ==
=== England ===
- Clay Hill, Berkshire
- Clay Hill, Bristol
- Clay Hill, London, a suburb in Enfield, London
- The historical name of Shortlands, Bromley, London
- Clayhill Brook, a river in Berkshire

=== United States ===
- Clay Hill, Alabama
- Clay Hill, Florida
- Clay Hill (New York)

=== Canada ===
- Clay Hills, Ontario

== People ==
- Clay Hill (lacrosse) (born 1976), Canadian lacrosse player
- Clayhill, a British folk band

== See also ==
- Cley Hill, Wiltshire, England
