= Geneva Mercer =

American artist (1889–1984)

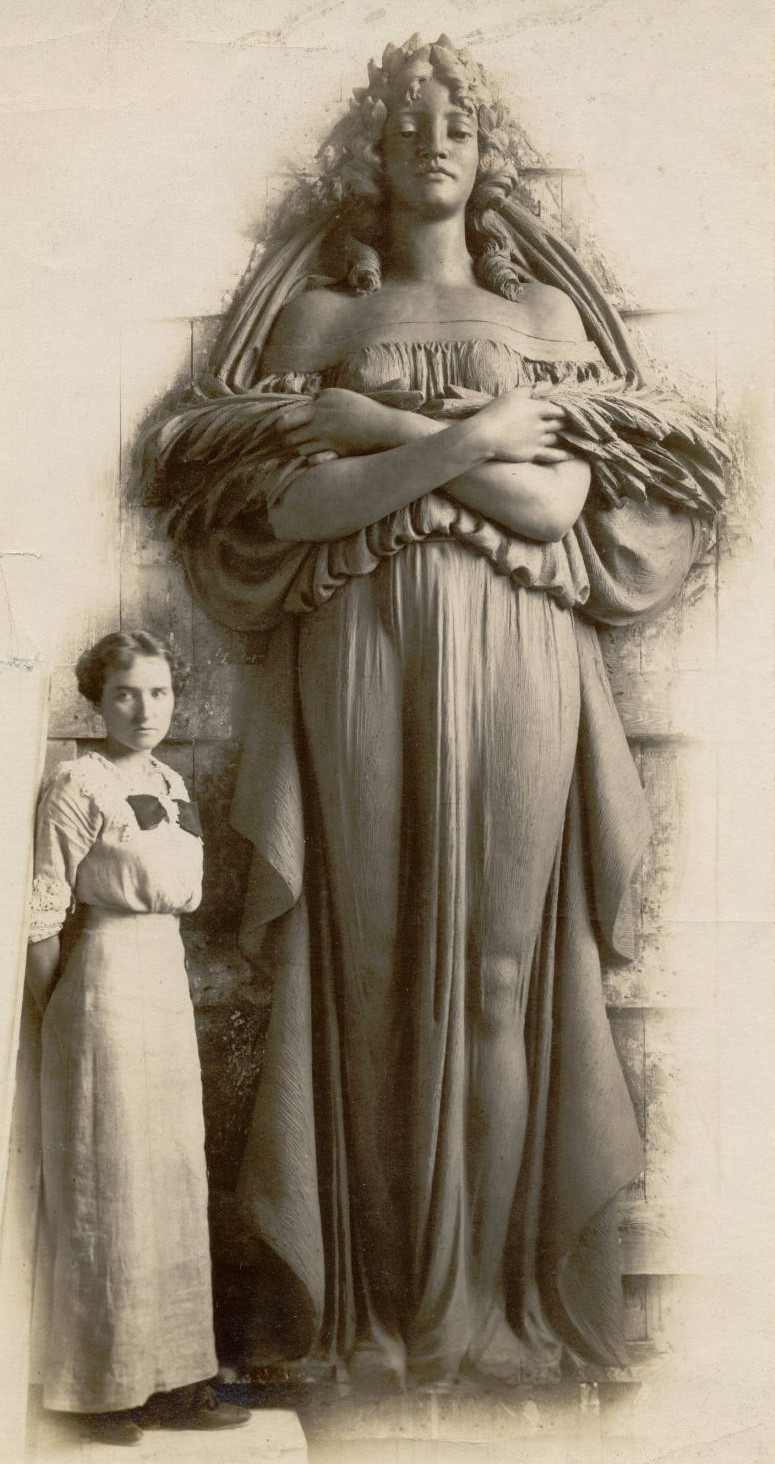
- Geneva Mercer with a model sculpture for the Gran Teatro de la Habana in Havana, Cuba. Taken circa 1911-1914.
- Born: January 27, 1889; Jefferson, Alabama
- Died: March 2, 1984 (aged 95); Demopolis, Alabama
- Resting place: Jefferson Cemetery, Jefferson, Alabama
- Known for: Sculpture, painting

Geneva Mercer (January 27, 1889 – March 2, 1984) was an American artist from Alabama. Best known as a sculptor, she was also an accomplished painter in her later years. Although most of her early work with Italian sculptor Giuseppe Moretti was done under his name, her best known individual works include Joyous Boy, Pied Piper, the Flimp Fountain, and several Julia Tutwiler sculptures located at the Alabama Department of Archives and History, University of Alabama, and University of Montevallo. She was posthumously inducted into the Alabama Women's Hall of Fame in 1989.

== Biography ==
Geneva Mercer was born in the small community of Jefferson in Marengo County on January 27, 1889. Her parents were Thomas Barton Mercer and Emma Elizabeth Berry. She attended the local village school, where she modeled her first sculpture, a crude red clay bust, at the age of nine. Her teacher recognized that she had a natural talent and obtained modeling wax and a book on sculpting for her. She completed high school in 1904 and went on to attend the State Normal School at Livingston, now known as the University of West Alabama. While there, her talents interested the school's president, Julia Tutwiler. Tutwiler secured an art teacher from Chicago to teach at the college and give instruction in modeling to Mercer.

Tutwiler later took some of Mercer's sculptures to Birmingham to display at the Commercial Club of Birmingham. Giuseppe Moretti, who had been commissioned by the Commercial Club in 1904 to create the monumental Vulcan statue for the city's display at the Louisiana Purchase Exposition, saw Mercer's work and recognized her talent. He asked her if she would intern at his studio. She served as his apprentice from 1907 to 1909 and would remain as his assistant until his death in 1935.

In 1909 Mercer left Alabama with Moretti and his wife, Dorothea Long Moretti, and relocated to New York City. Over the next thirteen years, in addition to New York, the trio lived in Pittsburgh, Florence, and Havana. One of Moretti and Mercer's greatest accomplishments during this period was the completion of Moretti's ninety-seven sculptures for the Gran Teatro de la Habana. They returned to Alabama from 1923 to 1925, where Moretti built a home and studio near his Talladega County marble quarries.

Due to the failure of the quarries and a variety of other circumstances, they then returned to Moretti's native Italy. Once there, the Morettis and Mercer occupied a large villa and studio in Sanremo. There Moretti and Mercer completed three of his last major American commissions together, Atlanta's Governor Brown Memorial, Nashville's Battle of Nashville Monument, and Dayton's John Henry Patterson Memorial. Moretti was diagnosed with cancer around 1930 and died in 1935. Mercer continued to operate his studio for some time after his death, producing many of her own works there.

Mercer later returned to the United States and eventually settled in Demopolis, Alabama, near her birthplace. She died there on March 2, 1984, and was buried in the Jefferson Cemetery.

== Selected works ==
- The Swing, bronze free-standing sculpture, 1916
- The Perfect Drive, bronze free-standing sculpture, 1916
- Pied Piper, marble free-standing sculpture, 1917
- Joyous Boy, bronze free-standing sculpture, 1923
- Julia S. Tutwiler, 1841-1916, marble bas-relief sculpture, 1933
- Flimp Fountain, bronze free-standing sculpture, 1937
- Innocenza, terracotta bas-relief sculpture, 1938
