= Consul, Alabama =

Unincorporated community in Alabama, United States

- Unincorporated community
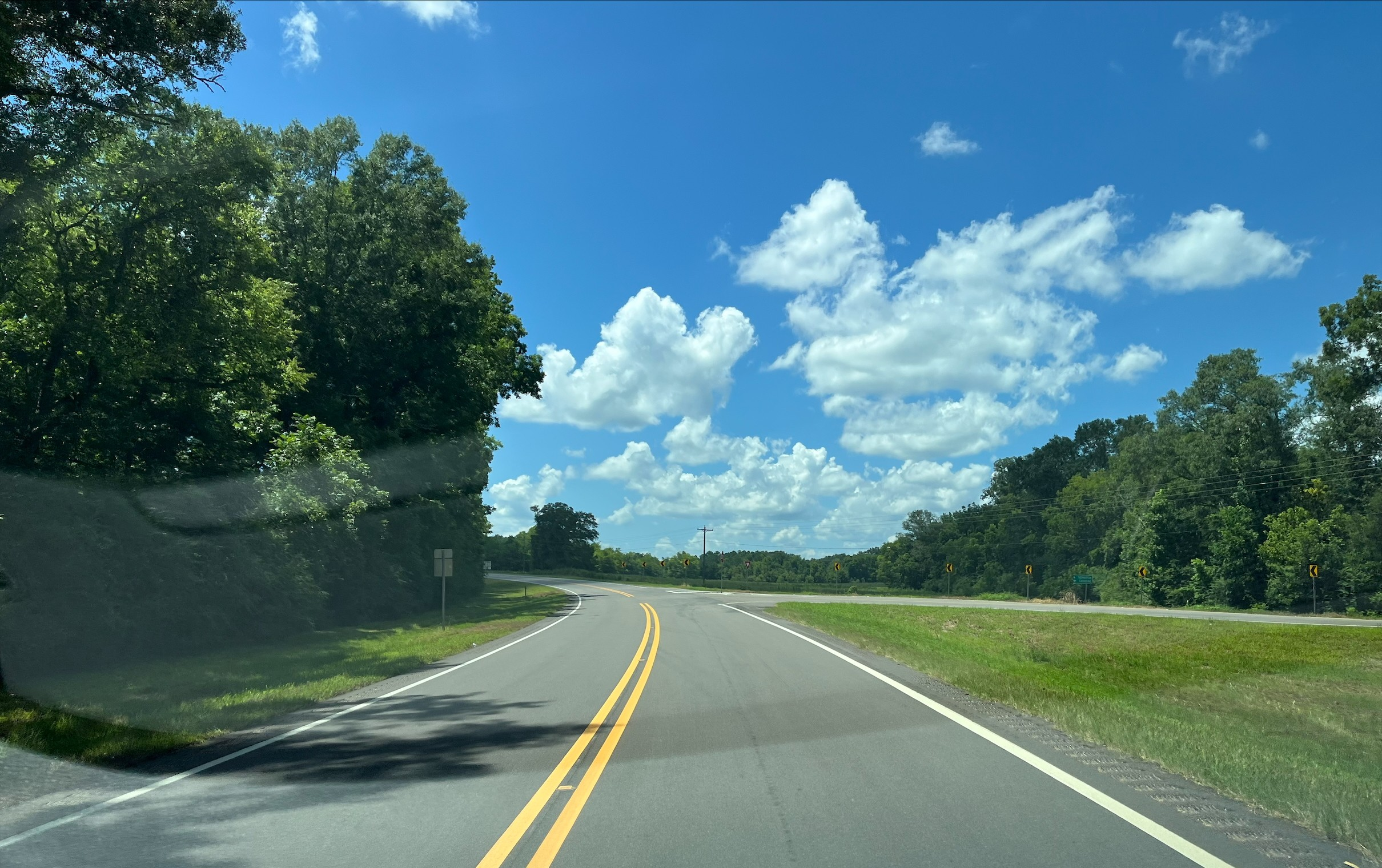
- Intersection of Alabama State Route 28 and Alabama State Route 66 in Consul

- Location within Alabama Location within the United States
- Coordinates: 32°15′51.48″N 87°32′24″W
- Country: United States
- State: Alabama
- County: Marengo
- Elevation: 239 ft (73 m)
- Time zone: UTC-6 (Central (CST))
  - Summer (DST): UTC-5 (CDT)
- Area code: 334

Consul is an unincorporated community in Marengo County, Alabama, United States. Consul had a post office at one time, but it no longer exists. The community has a cemetery, that being King Cemetery.

In 1920, the George H. Hopper Lumber Company operated in Consul.

The closest unincorporated community to Consul is McKinely, which is 2.5 miles away (4.02km) ; the closest town is Thomaston, which is 5 miles away (8.05 km)

== Geography ==
Consul is located at 32.26430°N 87.54000°W and has an elevation of 239 feet (73 m).
