= Half Chance =

Half Chance may refer to:

- Half Chance, Alabama
- Half Chance Iron Bridge
