= Hoboken (disambiguation) =

Hoboken may refer to:

- Hoboken, Antwerp, a district of Antwerp, Belgium
- Hoboken, Alabama, United States
- Hoboken, Georgia, United States
- Hoboken, New Jersey, United States

== People ==
- Anthony van Hoboken (1887–1983), Dutch musicologist
- Conrad III Schetz, 1st Baron of Hoboken.
- Conrad-Albert, 1st Duke d'Ursel, 1st Duke of Hoboken.

== See also ==
- Hoboken-Verzeichnis, catalogue of works by Joseph Haydn as compiled by Anthony van Hoboken
- Hoboken Terminal, an intermodal station on the Hudson River
- Hoboken Cemetery, North Bergen
- West Hoboken, New Jersey
- Hoboken Squat Cobbler, a fictitious fetish in Better Call Saul
