= Aimwell, Alabama =

Unincorporated community in Alabama, United States

- Unincorporated community
- Location within the state of Alabama Aimwell (the United States)
- Coordinates: 32°7′19.2″N 87°54′21.6″W
- Country: United States
- State: Alabama
- County: Marengo
- Elevation: 262 ft (80 m)
- Time zone: UTC-6 (Central (CST))
  - Summer (DST): UTC-5 (CDT)
- Area code: 334
- GNIS feature ID: 112946

Aimwell is an unincorporated community in Marengo County, Alabama, United States. Aimwell had a post office at one time, but it no longer exists.

== Geography ==
Aimwell is located at 32.122°N 87.906°W and has an elevation of 262 feet (80 m).

== Demographics ==
According to the returns from 1850-2010 for Alabama, it has never reported a population figure separately on the U.S. Census.
