= Moscow, Marengo County, Alabama =

Unincorporated community in Alabama, United States

Moscow, Alabama
- Unincorporated community
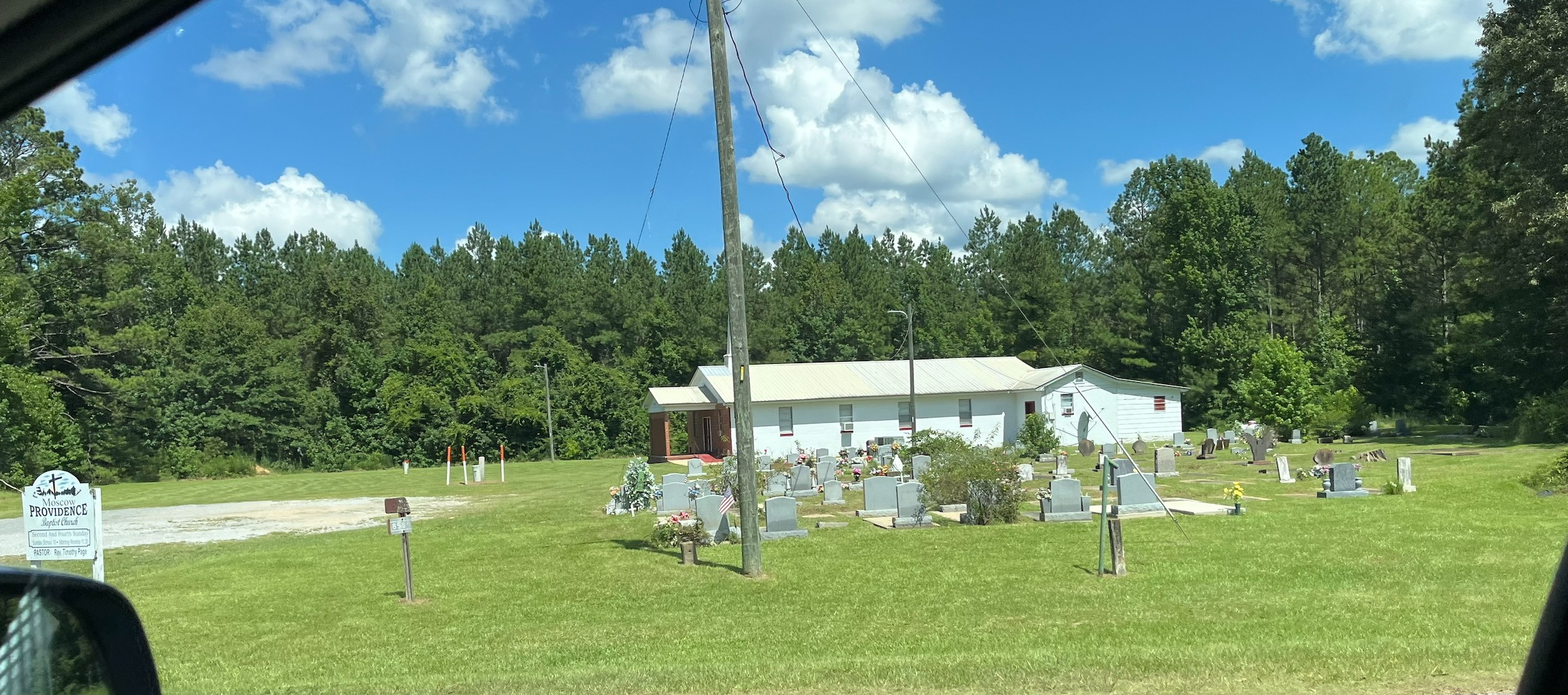
- Moscow Providence Baptist Church

- Location within the state of Alabama Moscow (the United States)
- Coordinates: 32°26′16.8″N 87°59′45.6″W
- Country: United States
- State: Alabama
- County: Marengo
- Elevation: 89 ft (27 m)
- Time zone: UTC-6 (Central (CST))
  - Summer (DST): UTC-5 (CDT)
- Area code: 334

Moscow is an unincorporated community in Marengo County, Alabama, United States. The community has also been known as Berlin. The community is likely named for a former local plantation.

== Geography ==
Moscow is located at 32.438°N 87.996°W and has an elevation of 187 feet (57 m).
