= Alabama State Route 66 =

State highway in Alabama, United States

State Route 66

Route information
- Maintained by ALDOT
- Length: 9.291 mi (14.952 km)
- Existed: 1957–present

Major junctions
- West end: SR 28 in Consul
- East end: SR 5 at Safford

Location
- Country: United States
- State: Alabama
- Counties: Marengo, Dallas

Highway system
- Alabama State Highway System; Interstate; US; State
← SR 65	→ SR 67

State Route 66 (SR 66) is a 9.291-mile-long (14.952 km) state highway in the west-central part of the U.S. state of Alabama. The western terminus of the highway is at an intersection with SR 28 at Consul, an unincorporated community in eastern Marengo County. The eastern terminus of the highway is at an intersection with SR 5 near the unincorporated community of Safford, in western Dallas County.

U.S. Route 31 (US 31) is a major north–south U.S. Highway running through the central United States. It begins in southern Alabama at an interchange with US 90 and US 98 in Spanish Fort, near Mobile, and extends northward through Alabama, Tennessee, Kentucky, and Indiana before terminating in Michigan. The highway runs for about 1,280 miles in total.

In Alabama, US 31 parallels Interstate 65 for most of its length, connecting cities like Montgomery, Birmingham, and Decatur. Entering Tennessee, it splits into US 31E and US 31W near Nashville, with both branches rejoining near Louisville, Kentucky. US 31 then travels north through Indiana, passing Indianapolis, Kokomo, and South Bend. Crossing into Michigan, the highway continues along the eastern shore of Lake Michigan, serving cities such as Benton Harbor, Holland, and Muskegon, before ending in Mackinaw City at Interstate 75, just south of the Mackinac Bridge.

Historically, US 31 was one of the original U.S. Highways established in 1926 and served as a primary north–south corridor before the Interstate Highway System was built. Today, while Interstate 65 and other highways carry much of the long-distance traffic, US 31 remains an important regional route, providing access to smaller communities, business districts, and scenic areas along its path.

== Route description ==
SR 66 is the second of four state highways that connect Linden with Selma. It assumes an eastward trajectory as it connects SR 28 and SR 5, traveling through rural areas in Alabama’s Black Belt. The highway is aligned along a two-lane road and does not travel through any incorporated communities.

== History ==
SR 66 was established in 1957. It replaced Marengo County Road 38. A previous segment of SR 66 existed from 1940 until 1957 in southeastern Alabama.

== Major intersections ==
County	Location	mi	km	Destinations	Notes
Marengo	Consul	0.000	0.000	SR 28 – Catherine, Thomaston	Western terminus
Dallas		9.291	14.952	SR 5 – Selma, Mobile	Eastern terminus
1.000 mi = 1.609 km; 1.000 km = 0.621 mi
