= Pope, Alabama =

Unincorporated community in Alabama, United States

- Unincorporated community
- Location within the state of Alabama Pope (the United States)
- Coordinates: 32°03′47″N 87°37′28″W
- Country: United States
- State: Alabama
- County: Marengo
- Elevation: 151 ft (46 m)
- Time zone: UTC-6 (Central (CST))
  - Summer (DST): UTC-5 (CDT)
- Area code: 334

Pope is an unincorporated community in Marengo County, Alabama, United States.

== History ==
A post office called Pope was established in 1938, and remained in operation until it was discontinued in 1967. The community was named after the first postmaster, Hubert C. Pope.
