= Lasca, Alabama =

Unincorporated community in Alabama, United States

- Unincorporated community
- Location within the state of Alabama Lasca (the United States)
- Coordinates: 32°0′59.51″N 87°57′30.02″W
- Country: United States
- State: Alabama
- County: Marengo
- Elevation: 223 ft (68 m)
- Time zone: UTC-6 (Central (CST))
  - Summer (DST): UTC-5 (CDT)
- Area code: 334

Lasca is an unincorporated community in Marengo County, Alabama, United States.

== Geography ==
Lasca is located at 32.01653°N 87.95834°W and has an elevation of 223 feet (68 m).
