= Nicholsville, Alabama =

Unincorporated community in Alabama, United States

- Unincorporated community
- Location within the state of Alabama Nicholsville (the United States)
- Coordinates: 32°0′28.8″N 87°54′7.2″W
- Country: United States
- State: Alabama
- County: Marengo
- Elevation: 187 ft (57 m)
- Time zone: UTC-6 (Central (CST))
  - Summer (DST): UTC-5 (CDT)
- Area code: 334

Nicholsville is an unincorporated community in Marengo County, Alabama, United States. Nicholsville had a post office at one time, but it no longer exists.

== Geography ==
Nicholsville is located at 32.008°N 87.902°W and has an elevation of 187 feet (57 m).

== Notable person ==
- Harwell Goodwin Davis, lawyer, Attorney General of Alabama, and President of Samford University from 1938 to 1958
