= Harwell Goodwin Davis =

American politician

- Born: November 23, 1882 near Nicholsville, Alabama
- Died: August 5, 1977 (aged 94); Birmingham, Alabama
- Education: University of Alabama (LL.B.)
- Occupations: Lawyer, Attorney General, Collector of Internal Revenue. President of Samford University

Harwell Goodwin Davis (November 23, 1882 – August 5, 1977) was a lawyer and Alabama State Attorney General, who also served as the President of Howard College, later Samford University, from 1938 until 1958. To date, he has been the university's third-longest serving president.

== Biography ==
Davis graduated from the University of Alabama with a Bachelor of Laws (LL.B.) in 1903 and practiced in Tallassee and later, Gadsden. In 1916, he was appointed First Assistant Attorney General of Alabama; he stepped down from the post in 1917 to enlist as an infantry officer in the 82nd Division. Davis served in World War I, where he was promoted to the rank of Major, wounded in action and received a citation for gallantry. After demobilization in 1919, he became Judge Advocate in the Alabama National Guard. In 1921, he was appointed Attorney General to complete the term of James Q. Smith, and re-elected for a further four-year term in 1923. During his time as Attorney General, Davis worked to expose and end the state's convict lease system.

In 1938, Davis became President of Howard College, which would later become Samford University. During his time in office, the college relocated to a new, larger campus, increased enrollment and improved financial stability. During the Second World War, Davis introduced a Civilian Pilot Training Program and later, a V-12 Navy College Training Program to boost student numbers during wartime.

In honor of Harwell Goodwin Davis' work, Samford University has named the main library on the campus in Homewood in his honor.

Legal offices
| Preceded by James Q. Smith | Attorney General of Alabama; 1921–1927 | Succeeded by Charlie C. McCall |
