= Salt Well, Alabama =

Unincorporated community in Alabama, United States

- Unincorporated community
- Location within the state of Alabama Salt Well (the United States)
- Coordinates: 32°27′25.49″N 87°55′52.03″W
- Country: United States
- State: Alabama
- County: Marengo
- Elevation: 112 ft (34 m)
- Time zone: UTC-6 (Central (CST))
  - Summer (DST): UTC-5 (CDT)
- Area code: 334

Salt Well is an unincorporated community in Marengo County, Alabama, United States.

== Geography ==
Salt Well is located at 32.45708°N 87.93112°W and has an elevation of 112 feet (34 m).
