= Wayne, Alabama =

Unincorporated community in Alabama, United States

- Unincorporated community
- Location within the state of Alabama Wayne (the United States)
- Coordinates: 32°6′20.52″N 87°48′3.02″W
- Country: United States
- State: Alabama
- County: Marengo
- Elevation: 272 ft (83 m)
- Time zone: UTC-6 (Central (CST))
  - Summer (DST): UTC-5 (CDT)
- ZIP code: 36784
- Area code: 334

Wayne is an unincorporated community in Marengo County, Alabama, United States. Wayne had a post office at one time, but it no longer exists.

== Geography ==
Wayne is located at 32.10570°N 87.80084°W and has an elevation of 272 feet (83 m).
