= Octagon, Alabama =

Unincorporated community in Alabama, United States

- Unincorporated community
- Location within the state of Alabama Octagon (the United States)
- Coordinates: 32°12′14.4″N 87°45′18″W
- Country: United States
- State: Alabama
- County: Marengo
- Elevation: 282 ft (86 m)
- Time zone: UTC-6 (Central (CST))
  - Summer (DST): UTC-5 (CDT)
- Area code: 334

Octagon is an unincorporated community in Marengo County, Alabama, United States. Octagon had a post office at one time, but it no longer exists.

== History ==
The community of Octagon obtained its name from the Bethlehem Baptist Church. The first building for this church was an octagonal structure, built by George Washington Barkley and his sons after the American Civil War. At one time the community also had a Methodist church, a two-story school, general store, cotton gin, and grist mill. Only the Baptist church remains.

== Geography ==
Octagon is located at 32.204°N 87.755°W and has an elevation of 282 feet (86 m).
