= Rembert, Alabama =

Unincorporated community in Alabama, United States

- Unincorporated community
- Location within the state of Alabama Rembert (the United States)
- Coordinates: 32°13′4.51″N 87°52′11.03″W
- Country: United States
- State: Alabama
- County: Marengo
- Elevation: 318 ft (97 m)
- Time zone: UTC-6 (Central (CST))
  - Summer (DST): UTC-5 (CDT)
- Area code: 334

Rembert, also known as Rembert Hills, is an unincorporated community in Marengo County, Alabama, United States. Rembert had a post office at one time, but it no longer exists.

== Geography ==
Rembert is located at 32.21792°N 87.86973°W and has an elevation of 318 feet (97 m).
