= Hugo, Alabama =

Unincorporated community in Alabama, United States

- Unincorporated community
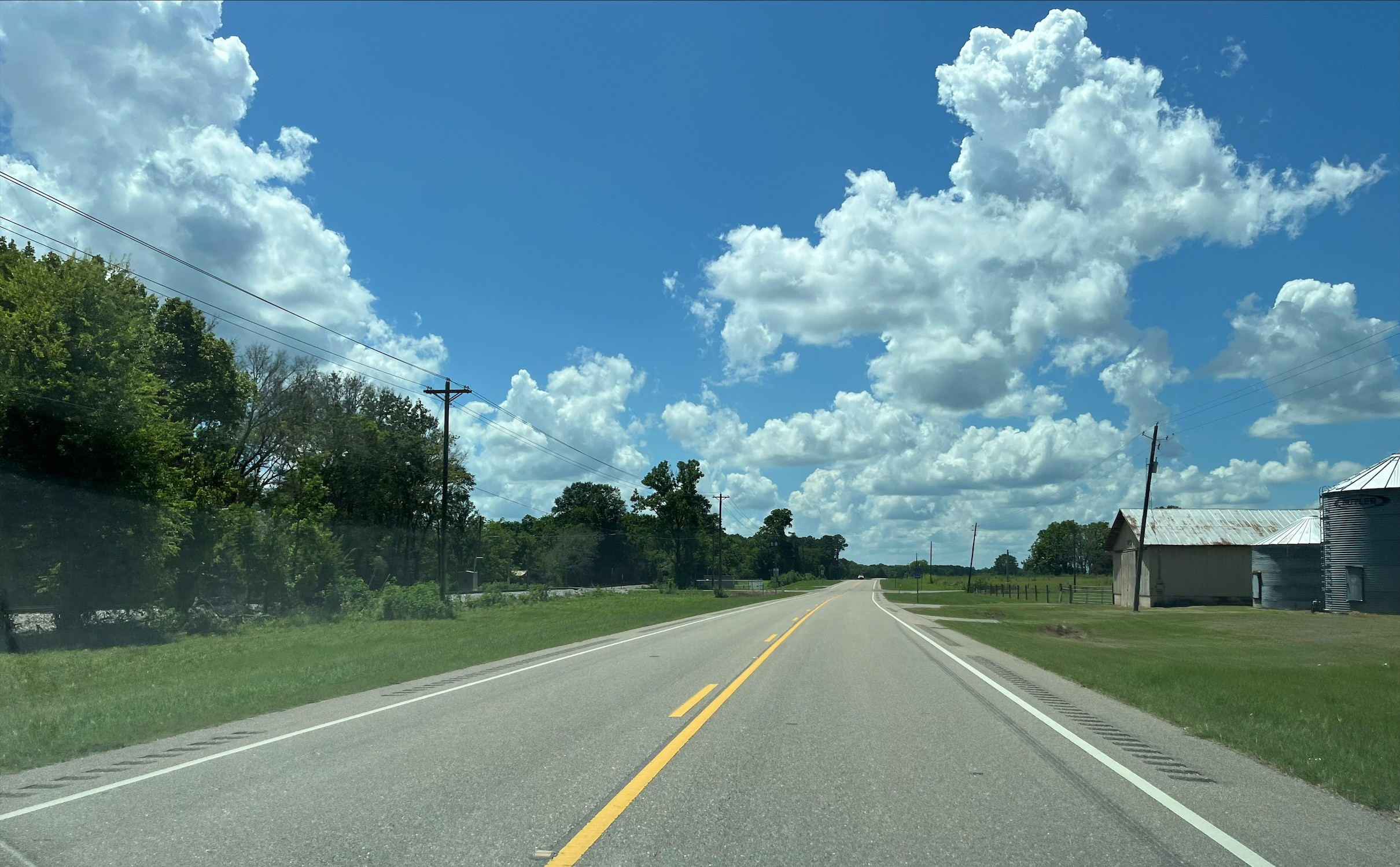
- Hugo along Alabama State Route 28. The CSX Railway is located on the left side of the image.

- Location within the state of Alabama Hugo (the United States)
- Coordinates: 32°16′0.48″N 87°41′20″W
- Country: United States
- State: Alabama
- County: Marengo
- Elevation: 161 ft (49 m)
- Time zone: UTC-6 (Central (CST))
  - Summer (DST): UTC-5 (CDT)
- Area code: 334

Hugo is an unincorporated community in Marengo County, Alabama, United States. Hugo had a post office at one time, but it no longer exists.

Hugo is likely named for a local person or possibly the writer Victor Hugo.

== Geography ==
Hugo is located at 32.26680°N 87.68889°W and has an elevation of 161 feet (49 m).
