= Jefferson, Alabama =

Unincorporated community in Alabama, United States

- Unincorporated community
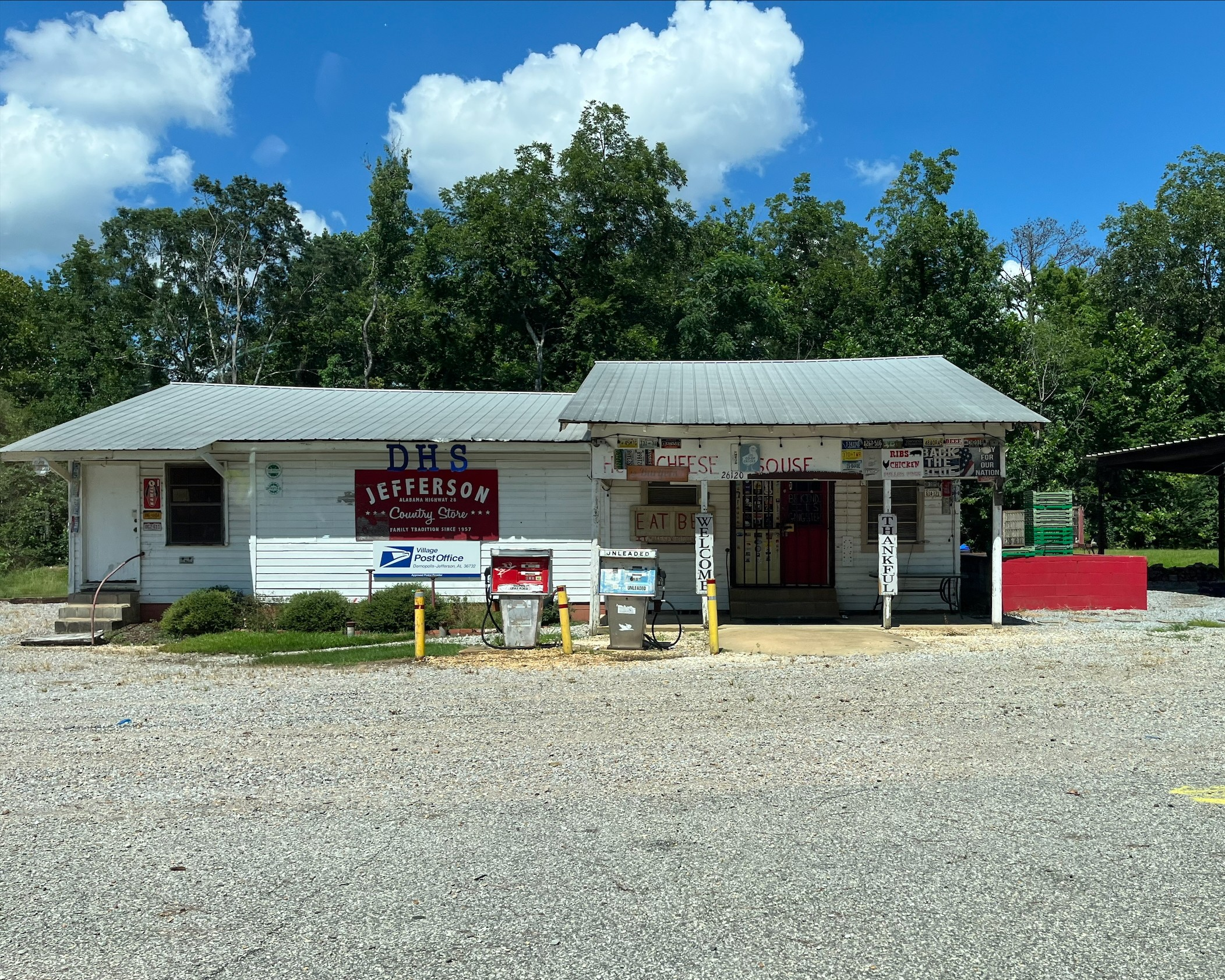
- Jefferson Country Store and Post Office

- Location within the state of Alabama Jefferson (the United States)
- Coordinates: 32°23′8.88″N 87°53′53.41″W
- Country: United States
- State: Alabama
- County: Marengo
- Elevation: 233 ft (71 m)
- Time zone: UTC-6 (Central (CST))
  - Summer (DST): UTC-5 (CDT)
- ZIP code: 36745
- Area code: 334

Jefferson is an unincorporated community in Marengo County, Alabama, United States.

== Demographics ==
Historical population
Census	Pop.	Note	%±
1870	233		—
1880	204		−12.4%
U.S. Decennial Census

Jefferson appeared on the 1870 and 1880 U.S. Censuses. In 1870, it reported 233 residents. Of those, 143 (61%) were black and 90 (39%) were white. Racial demographics in 1880 were not reported. These were the only two occasions on which it appeared on census records.

== History ==
It was founded in 1810, before Marengo was a county or Alabama was a state. Most of the original settlers were veterans of the American Revolution, including John Sample, John Gilmore, and Reuben Hildreth. The village was named Jefferson in 1820, after Thomas Jefferson, and that year saw the first church established. The population had reached 200 people by 1860 and the village contained two dry goods stores, one drugstore, a male and a female academy, a Masonic Lodge, a hotel, two tanneries, a wagon shop, and a blacksmith shop.

== Geography ==
Jefferson is located at 32.38580°N 87.89817°W and has an elevation of 233 feet (71 m).

== Historic sites ==
- Jefferson Historic District, added to the National Register of Historic Places on 13 December 1976.

== Notable person ==
- Geneva Mercer, sculptor.
