= Half Acre, Alabama =

Unincorporated community in Alabama, United States

- Unincorporated community
- Nickname: Hell's Half Acre
- Location within Alabama Location within the United States
- Coordinates: 32°11′42″N 87°54′43.2″W
- Country: United States
- State: Alabama
- County: Marengo
- Elevation: 115 ft (35 m)
- Time zone: UTC-6 (Central (CST))
  - Summer (DST): UTC-5 (CDT)
- Area code: 334

Half Acre is an unincorporated community in Marengo County, Alabama, United States. It has gone through a variety of name changes since the early 20th century. The community had a post office at one time, but it no longer exists. Although a thriving community in its early years, it has since dwindled into obscurity.

== History ==
Half Acre was originally known as Beaver Creek and was settled in the 1830s. By 1870 it had a post office, three general stores, a cotton gin, a cotton seed-oil press, grist mill, saw mill, brick kiln, hotel, and livery stables.

The tradition of how the Half Acre name originated holds that a half-acre piece of property in the community, at a crossroads next door to the hotel, had been overlooked in the original survey. County land records indicate that when the small piece of property was discovered to not be surveyed, it was deeded to "The Devil" and then became known as Hell's Half Acre. A saloon was eventually built there, only to later burn down. The title to the property was not clarified until the community wanted to build a church on the site of the former saloon, at which time the probate court transferred ownership from "The Devil" to the Half Acre Community Church. The "Hell's" was dropped from the name at this time and the entire community came to be known simply as Half Acre. The population of the community began to relocate elsewhere after World War II and today it is home to only the church and a few residences.

== Geography ==
Half Acre is situated above Beaver Creek, about 4 miles (6.4 km) east of the Tombigbee River. It is located at 32.195°N 87.912°W and has an elevation of 115 feet (35 m).
