= Pin Hook, Alabama =

Unincorporated community in Alabama, United States

- Unincorporated community
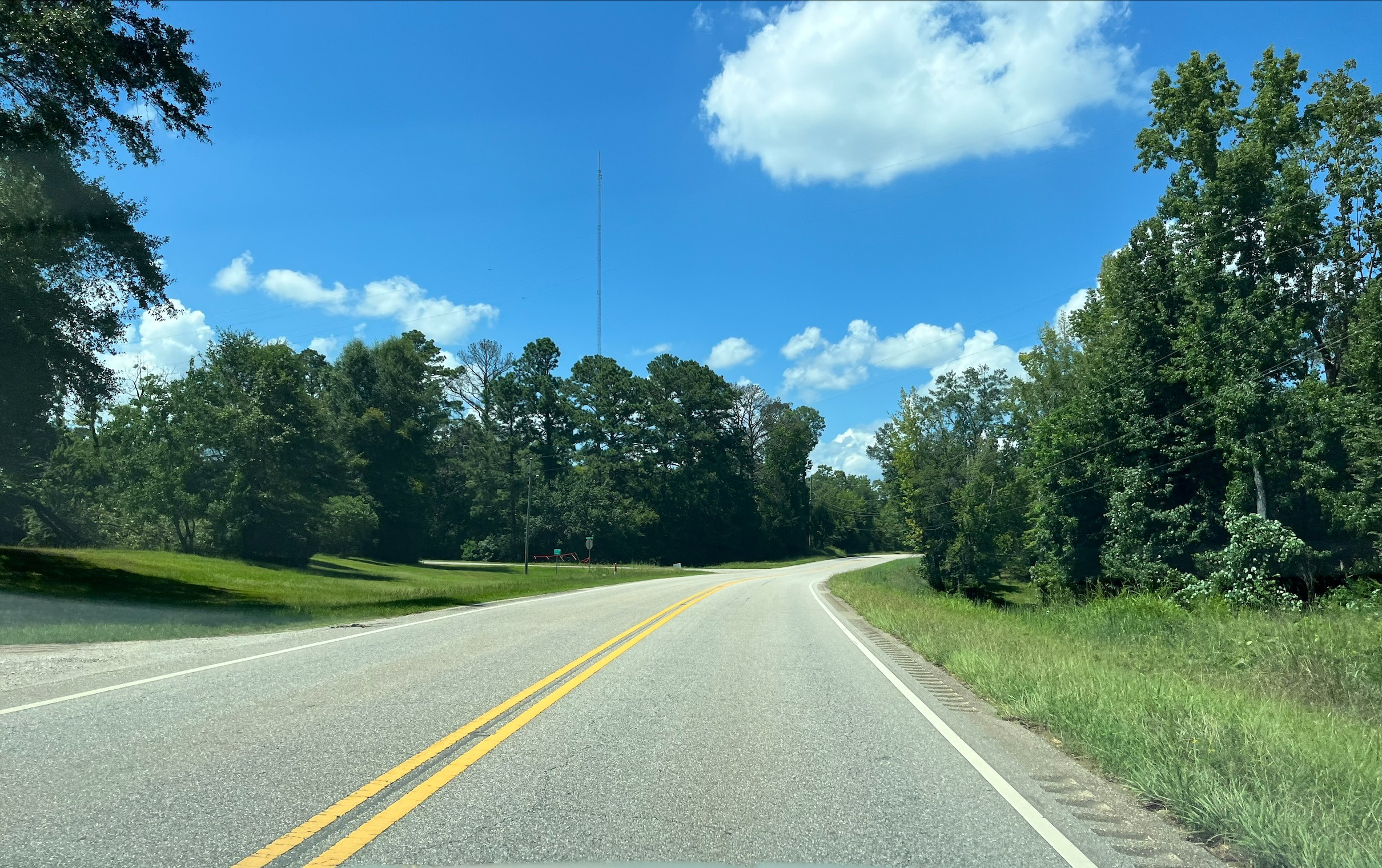
- Pin Hook along Alabama State Route 28

- Location within the state of Alabama Pin Hook (the United States)
- Coordinates: 32°21′27.5″N 87°52′18.05″W
- Country: United States
- State: Alabama
- County: Marengo
- Elevation: 249 ft (76 m)
- Time zone: UTC-6 (Central (CST))
  - Summer (DST): UTC-5 (CDT)
- Area code: 334

Pin Hook is an unincorporated community in Marengo County, Alabama, United States.

== Geography ==
Pin Hook is located at 32.35764°N 87.87168°W and has an elevation of 249 feet (76 m).
