= Marengo, Alabama =

Unincorporated community in Alabama, United States

- Unincorporated community
- Location within the state of Alabama Marengo (the United States)
- Coordinates: 32°3′25.52″N 87°48′51.01″W
- Country: United States
- State: Alabama
- County: Marengo
- Elevation: 180 ft (55 m)
- Time zone: UTC-6 (Central (CST))
  - Summer (DST): UTC-5 (CDT)
- Area code: 334

Marengo is an unincorporated community in Marengo County, Alabama, United States. A post office operated under the name Marengo from 1824 to 1828 and again from 1914 to 1947.

== Gallery ==
Below are photographs taken in Marengo as part of the Historic American Buildings Survey:

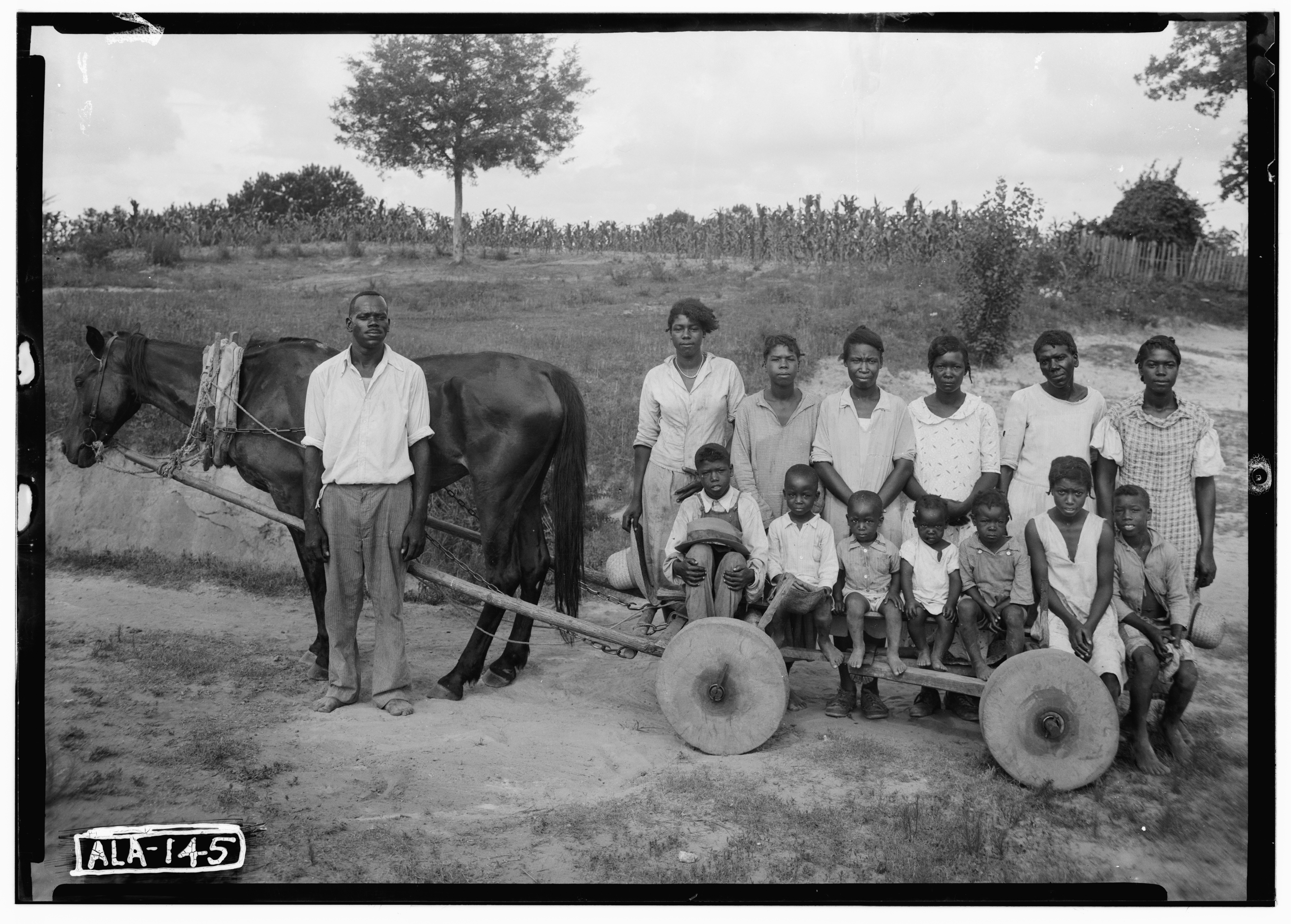
Hoover wagon, Pearson House

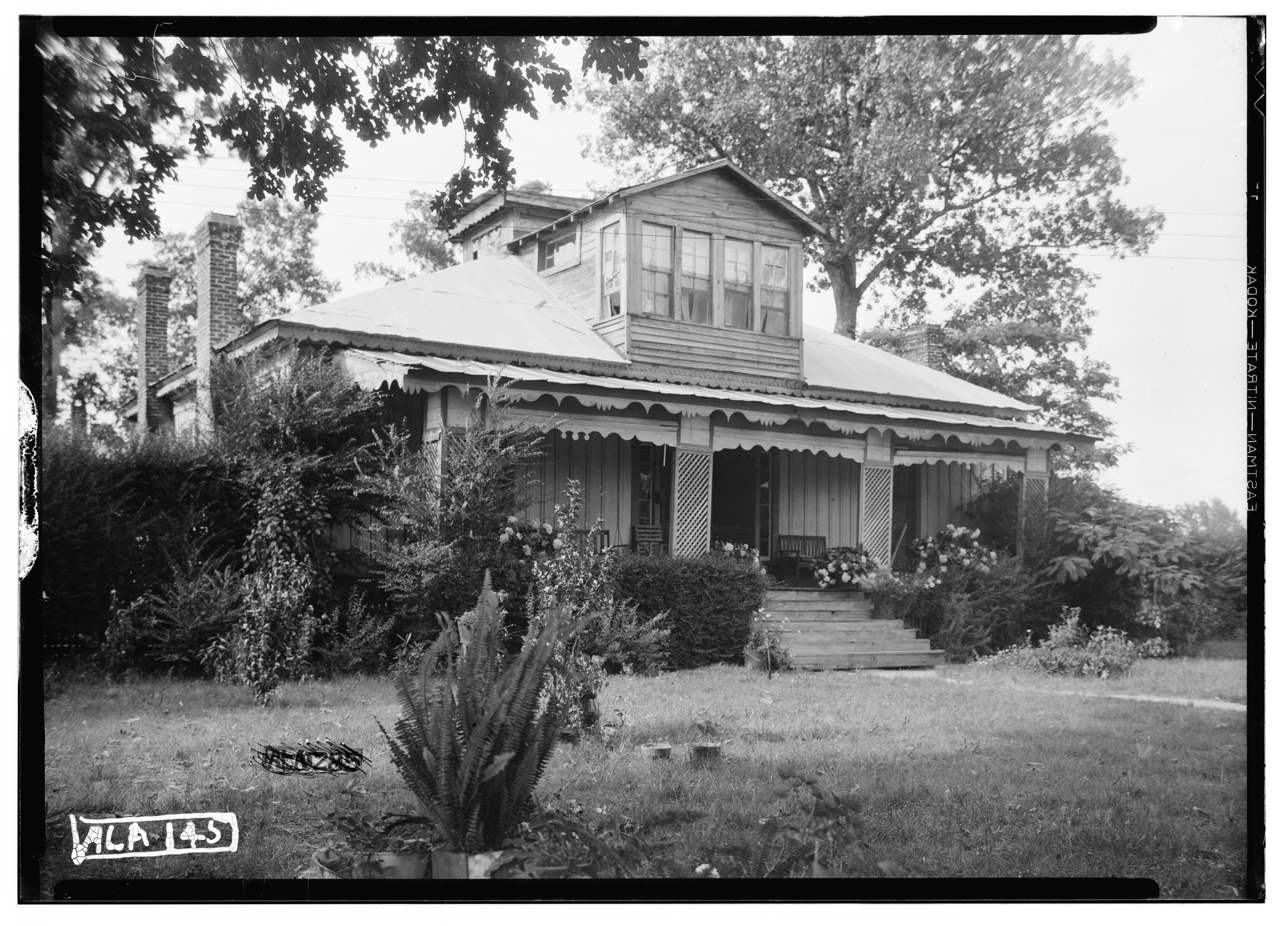
Pearson House
