= Alfalfa, Alabama =

Unincorporated community in Alabama, United States

- Unincorporated community
- Location within Alabama Location within the United States
- Coordinates: 32°30′37.48″N 87°45′52.02″W
- Country: United States
- State: Alabama
- County: Marengo
- Elevation: 144 ft (44 m)
- Time zone: UTC-6 (Central (CST))
  - Summer (DST): UTC-5 (CDT)
- Area code: 334

Alfalfa was an unincorporated community in Marengo County, Alabama, United States. It has since been annexed into the adjacent city of Demopolis. Alfalfa had a post office at one time, but it no longer exists. The settlement was originally named "Van Dorn" in honor of Confederate General Earl Van Dorn, later renamed "Eddins' Station" for State Senator Edward Oswell Eddins, but was eventually renamed "Alfalfa", for the alfalfa hay grown in the area.

== Geography ==
Alfalfa is located at 32.51041°N 87.76445°W and has an elevation of 144 feet (44 m).

== Demographics ==
Alfalfa never reported a population figure separately on the U.S. Census as an unincorporated community on the U.S. Census according to the census returns from 1850-2010. It has since been annexed into Demopolis.
