= Moores Valley, Alabama =

Unincorporated community in Alabama, United States

- Unincorporated community
- Location within the state of Alabama Moores Valley (the United States)
- Coordinates: 32°3′39.53″N 87°37′48″W
- Country: United States
- State: Alabama
- County: Marengo
- Elevation: 128 ft (39 m)
- Time zone: UTC-6 (Central (CST))
  - Summer (DST): UTC-5 (CDT)
- Area code: 334

Moores Valley is an unincorporated community in Marengo County, Alabama, United States.

== History ==
Moores Valley was founded when the Frisco Railroad was extended to that point.

== Geography ==
Moores Valley is located at 32.06098°N 87.63000°W and has an elevation of 128 feet (39 m).
