= Marengo County, Alabama =

County in Alabama, United States

- County
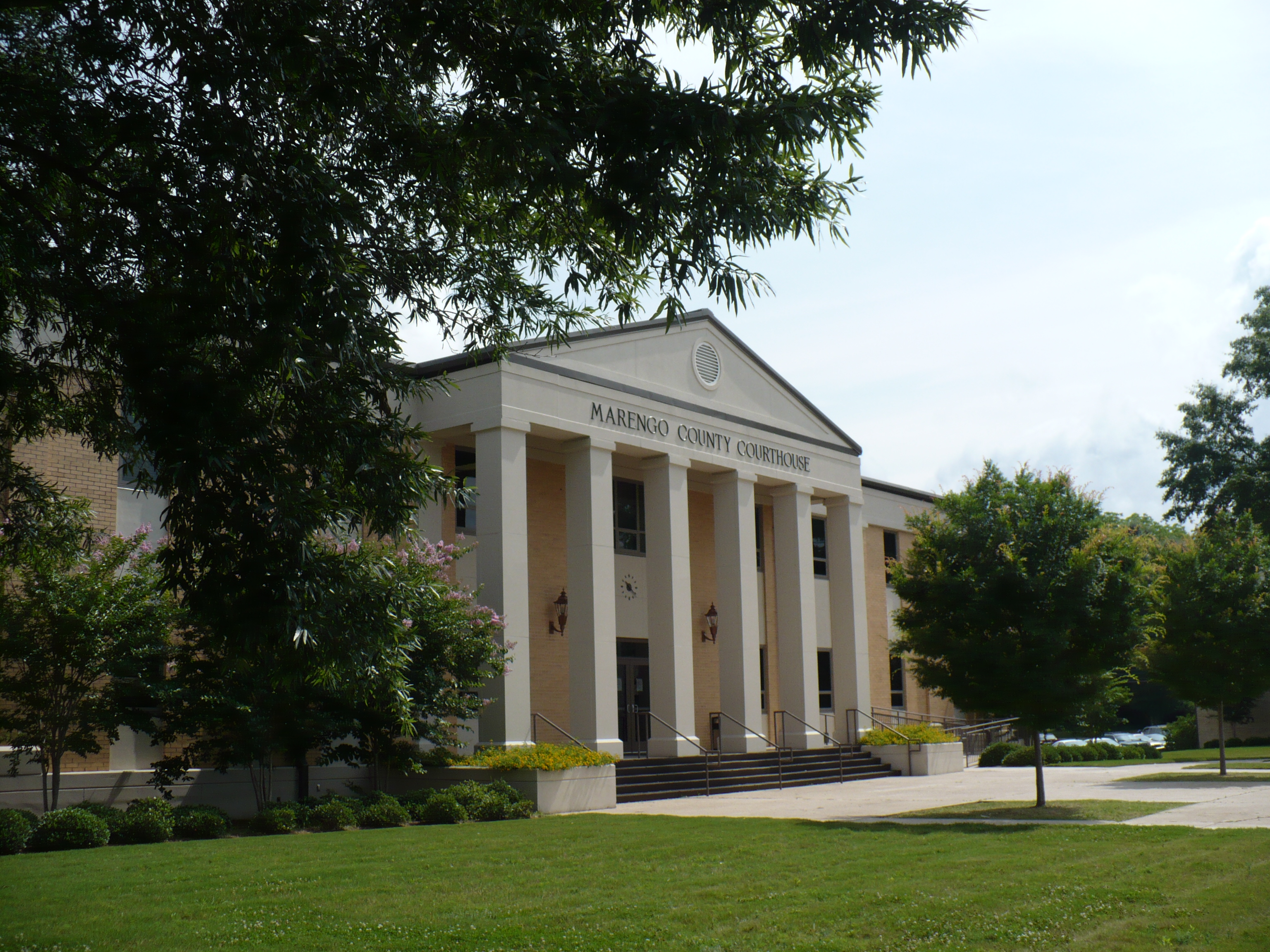
- Marengo County Courthouse in Linden

- Location within the U.S. state of Alabama
- Coordinates: 32°14′31″N 87°47′22″W
- Country: United States
- State: Alabama
- Founded: February 6, 1818
- Named for: Battle of Marengo
- Seat: Linden
- Largest city: Demopolis

Area
  - Total: 983 sq mi (2,550 km^{2})
  - Land: 977 sq mi (2,530 km^{2})
  - Water: 5.8 sq mi (15 km^{2}) 0.6%

Population (2020)
  - Total: 19,323
  - Estimate (2025): 18,311 ▼
  - Density: 19.8/sq mi (7.64/km^{2})
- Time zone: UTC−6 (Central)
  - Summer (DST): UTC−5 (CDT)
- Congressional district: 7th
- Website: marengocountyal.com
- County Number 48 on Alabama License Plates

Marengo County is a county located in the west central portion of the U.S. state of Alabama. As of the 2020 census, the population was 19,323. The largest city is Demopolis, and the county seat is Linden. It is named in honor of the Battle of Marengo near Turin, Italy, where French leader Napoleon Bonaparte defeated the Austrians on June 14, 1800.

== History ==
Marengo County was created by the Alabama Territorial legislature on February 6, 1818, from land acquired from the Choctaw by the Treaty of Fort St. Stephens on October 24, 1816. Like the other four of the "Five Civilized Tribes", over the course of the following 20 years the Choctaw were largely forced west of the Mississippi River and into what is now Oklahoma during the period of Indian Removal conducted by the federal government.

The county was named to commemorate Napoleon's victory at the Battle of Marengo over Austrian armies on June 14, 1800. This name was chosen in honor of the first European settlers, Bonapartists exiled from France after Napoleon's downfall. In 1817 a number of French settled the area around Demopolis. They were trying to develop a Vine and Olive Colony. Other ethnic French who settled here were refugees from the colony of Saint-Domingue, where enslaved Africans and "free people of color" had routed Napoleon's troops and white colonists, and declared independence in 1804. They established the territory as Haiti, the second republic in the western hemisphere.

The county seat was originally known as the Town of Marengo, but in 1823 the name was changed to Linden. Linden is a shortened version of Hohenlinden, scene of the Battle of Hohenlinden, a French victory in Bavaria on December 3, 1800, during Napoleon's campaign.

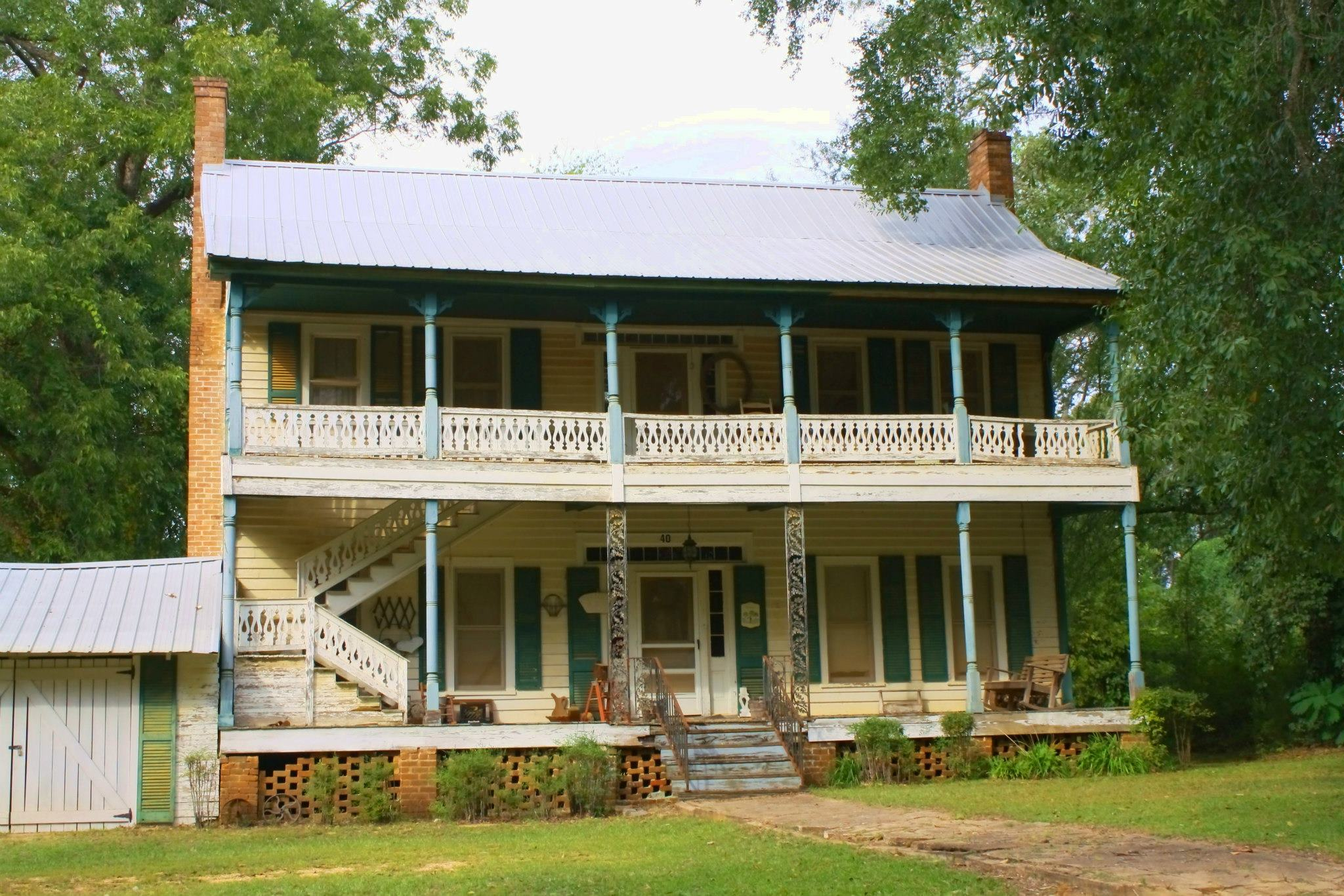
Barney's Upper Place, an I-house in Putnam that was built in 1833.

Situated in Alabama's Black Belt and having a naturally rich soil, the county was developed by planters for numerous cotton plantations, dependent on the forced labor of large gangs of enslaved African Americans. The enslaved comprised the majority of the county population decades before the American Civil War. In 1860 the population consisted of 24,409 slaves, 6,761 free whites (including 944 slave owners), and one "free person of color," for a total combined population of 31,171. At this time there were 778 plantations and farms in the county.

The fourth-oldest Jewish congregation in Alabama, B'nai Jeshurun, was established in Demopolis in 1858 by immigrants and migrants from other Southern cities.

After the Civil War, the economy continued to be based on agriculture. In the transition to free labor, many freedmen turned to sharecropping or tenant farming as a way to establish some independence. They did not want to work in white-controlled field gangs.

The county population began to diminish rapidly during and after World War II. People left the farms for manufacturing jobs elsewhere, particularly with the wartime buildup of the defense industry on the West Coast. The movement of African Americans out of Alabama and other parts of the South was considered part of the Great Migration, by which 5 million left the region from 1940 to 1970. In addition to seeking jobs, they sought better conditions than the disfranchisement and Jim Crow oppression they faced in Alabama and other states of the South.

Most of the former cotton fields were gradually converted to pastures for cattle and horses, developed into tree plantations for timber and paper production, or transformed into commercial ponds for farming grain-fed catfish. Beginning in the 1960s, industry began to move into the area. The work force was employed in paper mills, lumber mills, and chemical plants.

County courthouse fires occurred in 1848 and 1965. Each time most of the court records were saved, as they were in a protected vault.

== Geography ==
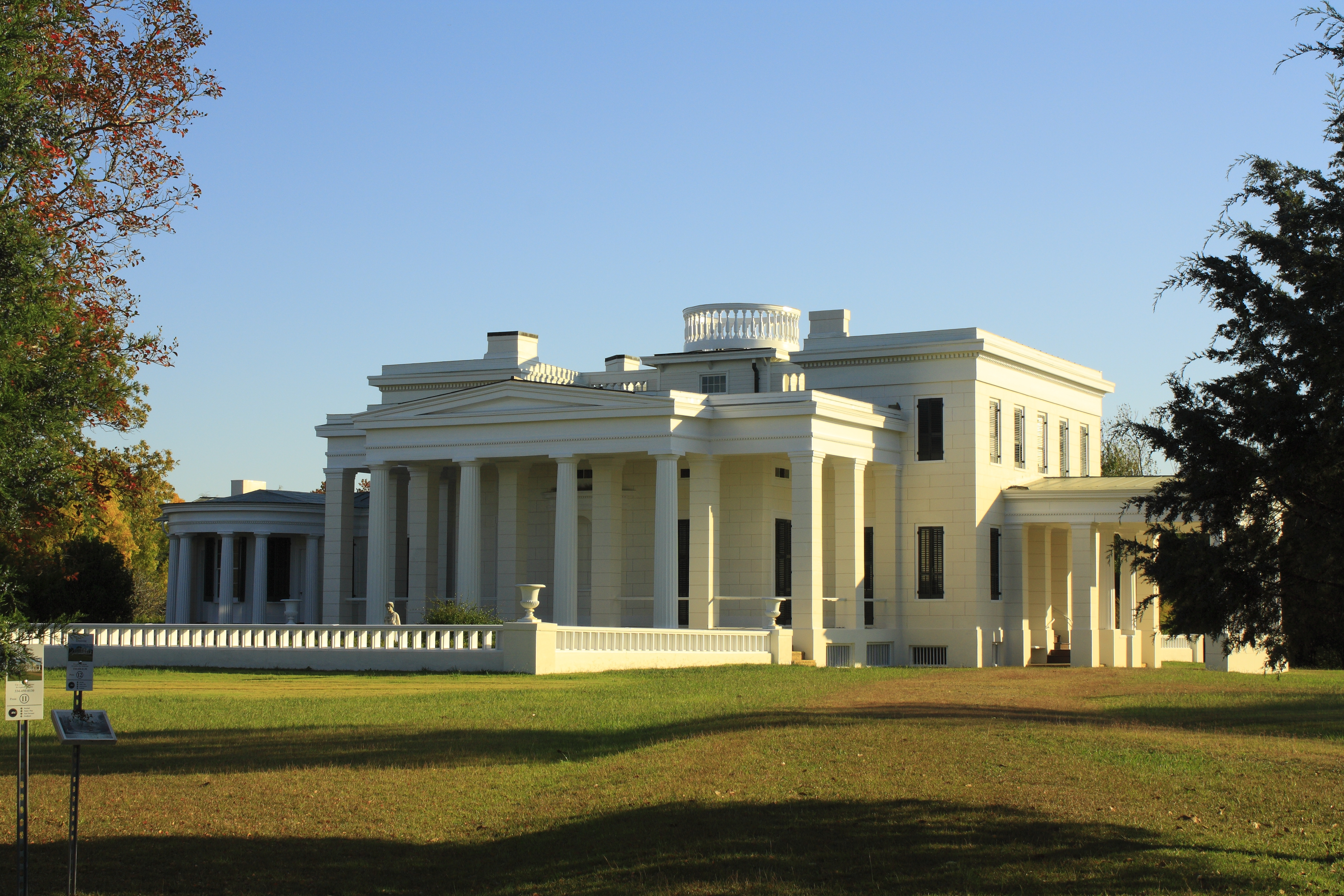
Gaineswood (built 1843–61), a National Historic Landmark in Demopolis.

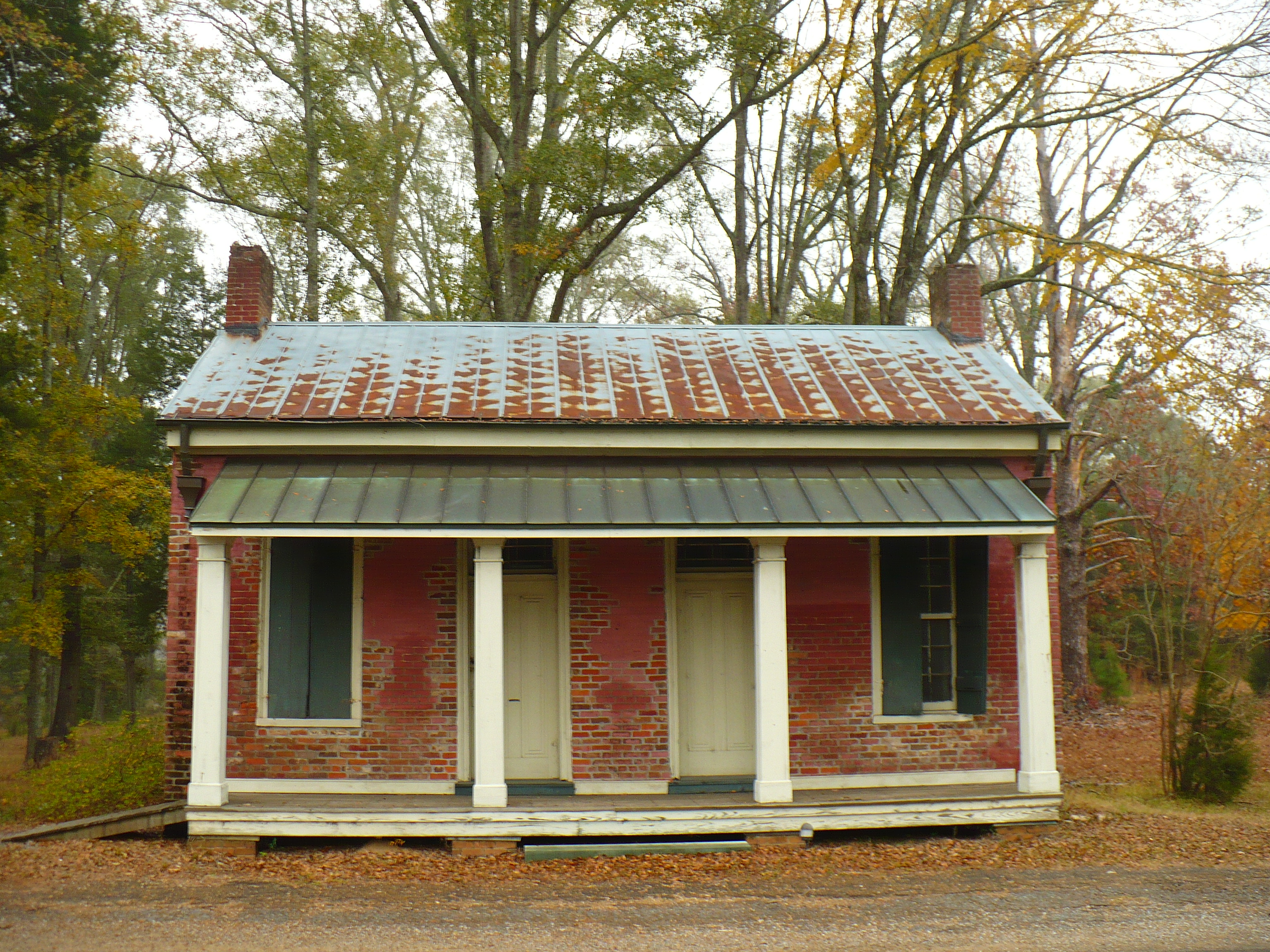
Boddie Law Office-Town Hall (built 1858) in Dayton. On the Alabama Register of Landmarks and Heritage.

Marengo County is situated in the west-central area of the state. According to the United States Census Bureau, the county has a total area of 983 square miles (2,550 km^{2}), of which 977 square miles (2,530 km^{2}) is land and 5.8 square miles (15 km^{2}) (0.6%) is water. The entire western county border is formed by the Tombigbee River and a small northwestern portion is formed by the Black Warrior River.

=== Major highways ===
- U.S. Highway 43 / State Route 13 (unsigned)
- U.S. Highway 80 / State Route 8 (unsigned)
- State Route 5
- State Route 10
- State Route 25
- State Route 28
- State Route 66
- State Route 69
- State Route 114

=== Adjacent counties ===
- Hale County (north)
- Perry County (northeast)
- Dallas County (east)
- Wilcox County (southeast)
- Clarke County (south)
- Choctaw County (southwest)
- Sumter County (northwest)
- Greene County (north-northwest)

== Demographics ==
Historical population
Census	Pop.	Note	%±
1820	2,933		—
1830	7,700		162.5%
1840	17,264		124.2%
1850	27,831		61.2%
1860	31,171		12.0%
1870	26,151		−16.1%
1880	30,890		18.1%
1890	33,095		7.1%
1900	38,315		15.8%
1910	39,923		4.2%
1920	36,065		−9.7%
1930	36,426		1.0%
1940	35,736		−1.9%
1950	29,494		−17.5%
1960	27,098		−8.1%
1970	23,819		−12.1%
1980	25,047		5.2%
1990	23,084		−7.8%
2000	22,539		−2.4%
2010	21,027		−6.7%
2020	19,323		−8.1%
2025 (est.)	18,311	▼	−5.2%
U.S. Decennial Census; 1790–1960 1900–1990; 1990–2000 2010–2020

=== 2020 Census ===
Marengo County, Alabama – Racial and ethnic composition Note: the US Census treats Hispanic/Latino as an ethnic category. This table excludes Latinos from the racial categories and assigns them to a separate category. Hispanics/Latinos may be of any race.
Race / Ethnicity (NH = Non-Hispanic)	Pop 2000	Pop 2010	Pop 2020	% 2000	% 2010	% 2020
White alone (NH)	10,582	9,607	8,375	46.95%	45.69%	43.34%
Black or African American alone (NH)	11,581	10,838	10,133	51.38%	51.54%	52.44%
Native American or Alaska Native alone (NH)	19	31	6	0.08%	0.15%	0.03%
Asian alone (NH)	37	53	54	0.16%	0.25%	0.28%
Pacific Islander alone (NH)	2	9	1	0.01%	0.04%	0.01%
Other race alone (NH)	8	1	41	0.04%	0.00%	0.21%
Mixed race or Multiracial (NH)	91	136	345	0.40%	0.65%	1.79%
Hispanic or Latino (any race)	219	352	368	0.97%	1.67%	1.90%
Total	22,539	21,027	19,323	100.00%	100.00%	100.00%

As of the 2020 census, the county had a population of 19,323. The median age was 43.6 years. 22.1% of residents were under the age of 18 and 20.4% of residents were 65 years of age or older. For every 100 females there were 89.1 males, and for every 100 females age 18 and over there were 85.5 males age 18 and over.

The racial makeup of the county was 43.6% White, 52.7% Black or African American, 0.0% American Indian and Alaska Native, 0.3% Asian, 0.0% Native Hawaiian and Pacific Islander, 1.1% from some other race, and 2.2% from two or more races. Hispanic or Latino residents of any race comprised 1.9% of the population.

32.2% of residents lived in urban areas, while 67.8% lived in rural areas.

There were 8,226 households in the county, of which 28.9% had children under the age of 18 living with them and 37.2% had a female householder with no spouse or partner present. About 33.2% of all households were made up of individuals and 14.3% had someone living alone who was 65 years of age or older.

There were 9,777 housing units, of which 15.9% were vacant. Among occupied housing units, 72.3% were owner-occupied and 27.7% were renter-occupied. The homeowner vacancy rate was 1.3% and the rental vacancy rate was 7.1%.

=== 2010 census ===
As of the census of 2010, there were 21,027 people living in the county. 51.7% were Black or African American, 46.4% White, 0.3% Asian, 0.2% Native American, 0.1% Pacific Islander, 0.7% of some other race and 0.8% of two or more races. 1.7% were Hispanic or Latino (of any race).

=== 2000 census ===
As of the census of 2000, there were 22,539 people, 8,767 households, and 6,277 families living in the county. The population density was 23 people per square mile (8.9 people/km^{2}). There were 10,127 housing units at an average density of 10 units per square mile (3.9 units/km^{2}). The racial makeup of the county was 51.71% Black or African American, 47.28% White, 0.08% Native American, 0.18% Asian, 0.01% Pacific Islander, 0.25% from other races, and 0.47% from two or more races. 0.97% of the population were Hispanic or Latino of any race.

There were 8,767 households, out of which 34.70% had children under the age of 18 living with them, 48.40% were married couples living together, 19.40% had a female householder with no husband present, and 28.40% were non-families. 26.50% of all households were made up of individuals, and 12.10% had someone living alone who was 65 years of age or older. The average household size was 2.55 and the average family size was 3.08.

In the county, the population was spread out, with 28.50% under the age of 18, 8.00% from 18 to 24, 26.00% from 25 to 44, 22.90% from 45 to 64, and 14.60% who were 65 years of age or older. The median age was 36 years. For every 100 females there were 88.30 males. For every 100 females age 18 and over, there were 82.20 males.

The median income for a household in the county was $27,025, and the median income for a family was $35,475. Males had a median income of $36,053 versus $19,571 for females. The per capita income for the county was $15,308. About 22.20% of families and 25.90% of the population were below the poverty line, including 33.70% of those under age 18 and 25.30% of those age 65 or over.

According to the New York Times, by 2017, the rural Black Belt that stretches across the middle of the state is home to largely poor counties that are predominantly African-American. These counties include Dallas, Lowndes, Marengo and Perry."

== Education ==
For the 2014–15 school year, the Marengo County School District is operating three K–12 schools, one each in Dixons Mills, Sweet Water, and Thomaston. One former county school in the Demopolis area was closed by the school board following the 2013–14 school year. Demopolis and Linden have city-run school systems, the Demopolis City School District and Linden City Schools.

== Culture ==
=== Events ===
- Candlelight Evening at Gaineswood, part of Christmas in the Canebrake, in Demopolis
- Christmas on the River in Demopolis
- Faunsdale Biker Rally in Faunsdale
- Alabama Crawfish Festival in Faunsdale
- Harvest Festival in Demopolis
- Historic Demopolis Spring Pilgrimage in Demopolis
- Pepper Jelly Festival in Thomaston
- Southern Literary Trail in Demopolis

=== Places of interest ===
Marengo County is home to the Alabama Rural Heritage Center and Chickasaw State Park. The Tombigbee River and Black Warrior River form portions of the western and northern county borders and provide recreational opportunities. Marengo County has 28 sites listed on the National Register of Historic Places, one of which is also a National Historic Landmark. Additionally, 19 sites are listed on the Alabama Register of Landmarks and Heritage.

== Politics ==
Like the rest of the Black Belt, Marengo County leans Democratic. However, it often produces narrow margins for winning candidates; no presidential candidate has won more than 54% of the vote in Marengo since Richard Nixon in 1972. In 2020, Donald Trump lost the county by only 145 votes. Trump won it during his successful third bid for the White House in 2024: the ninth consecutive election where the winner in Marengo won the national popular vote.

United States presidential election results for Marengo County, Alabama
Year	Republican		Democratic		Third party(ies)	
Year	No.	%	No.	%	No.	%
1824	25	13.59%	150	81.52%	9	4.89%
1832	0	0.00%	499	100.00%	0	0.00%
1836	523	55.34%	422	44.66%	0	0.00%
1840	842	58.59%	595	41.41%	0	0.00%
1844	726	53.38%	634	46.62%	0	0.00%
1848	739	57.20%	553	42.80%	0	0.00%
1852	450	45.18%	526	52.81%	20	2.01%
1856	0	0.00%	789	58.19%	567	41.81%
1860	0	0.00%	63	4.46%	1,350	95.54%
1868	2,793	59.78%	1,879	40.22%	0	0.00%
1872	1,620	49.45%	1,656	50.55%	0	0.00%
1876	1,982	41.84%	2,755	58.16%	0	0.00%
1880	1,825	43.62%	2,359	56.38%	0	0.00%
1884	1,523	38.27%	2,457	61.73%	0	0.00%
1888	1,933	36.07%	3,426	63.93%	0	0.00%
1892	233	4.41%	2,847	53.94%	2,198	41.64%
1896	764	19.24%	3,168	79.80%	38	0.96%
1900	234	9.17%	2,306	90.40%	11	0.43%
1904	56	4.61%	1,149	94.65%	9	0.74%
1908	78	5.45%	1,333	93.15%	20	1.40%
1912	9	0.64%	1,386	97.88%	21	1.48%
1916	19	1.26%	1,491	98.61%	2	0.13%
1920	42	2.97%	1,370	97.03%	0	0.00%
1924	17	1.35%	1,243	98.42%	3	0.24%
1928	752	28.38%	1,898	71.62%	0	0.00%
1932	50	2.28%	2,097	95.45%	50	2.28%
1936	33	1.42%	2,287	98.54%	1	0.04%
1940	70	2.97%	2,284	96.94%	2	0.08%
1944	89	4.83%	1,746	94.69%	9	0.49%
1948	67	3.45%	0	0.00%	1,876	96.55%
1952	1,362	43.21%	1,790	56.79%	0	0.00%
1956	1,009	33.06%	1,858	60.88%	185	6.06%
1960	1,235	44.25%	1,436	51.45%	120	4.30%
1964	3,677	82.33%	0	0.00%	789	17.67%
1968	457	4.99%	3,479	38.01%	5,218	57.00%
1972	5,156	65.05%	2,645	33.37%	125	1.58%
1976	3,841	43.87%	4,731	54.04%	183	2.09%
1980	4,048	41.90%	5,178	53.60%	434	4.49%
1984	5,261	51.51%	4,811	47.11%	141	1.38%
1988	4,241	48.61%	4,402	50.45%	82	0.94%
1992	4,470	39.75%	5,632	50.09%	1,142	10.16%
1996	4,013	43.18%	4,899	52.71%	382	4.11%
2000	4,690	48.81%	4,841	50.39%	77	0.80%
2004	5,255	50.91%	5,037	48.80%	30	0.29%
2008	5,516	48.09%	5,926	51.66%	29	0.25%
2012	5,336	46.23%	6,167	53.43%	40	0.35%
2016	5,233	47.60%	5,615	51.07%	146	1.33%
2020	5,343	49.02%	5,488	50.35%	69	0.63%
2024	4,995	51.59%	4,631	47.83%	56	0.58%

United States Senate election results for Marengo County, Alabama2
Year	Republican		Democratic		Third party(ies)	
Year	No.	%	No.	%	No.	%
2020	5,166	47.56%	5,687	52.36%	9	0.08%

United States Senate election results for Marengo County, Alabama3
Year	Republican		Democratic		Third party(ies)	
Year	No.	%	No.	%	No.	%
2022	3,807	52.41%	3,375	46.46%	82	1.13%

Alabama Gubernatorial election results for Marengo County
Year	Republican		Democratic		Third party(ies)	
Year	No.	%	No.	%	No.	%
2022	3,851	52.80%	3,317	45.48%	125	1.71%

== Communities ==
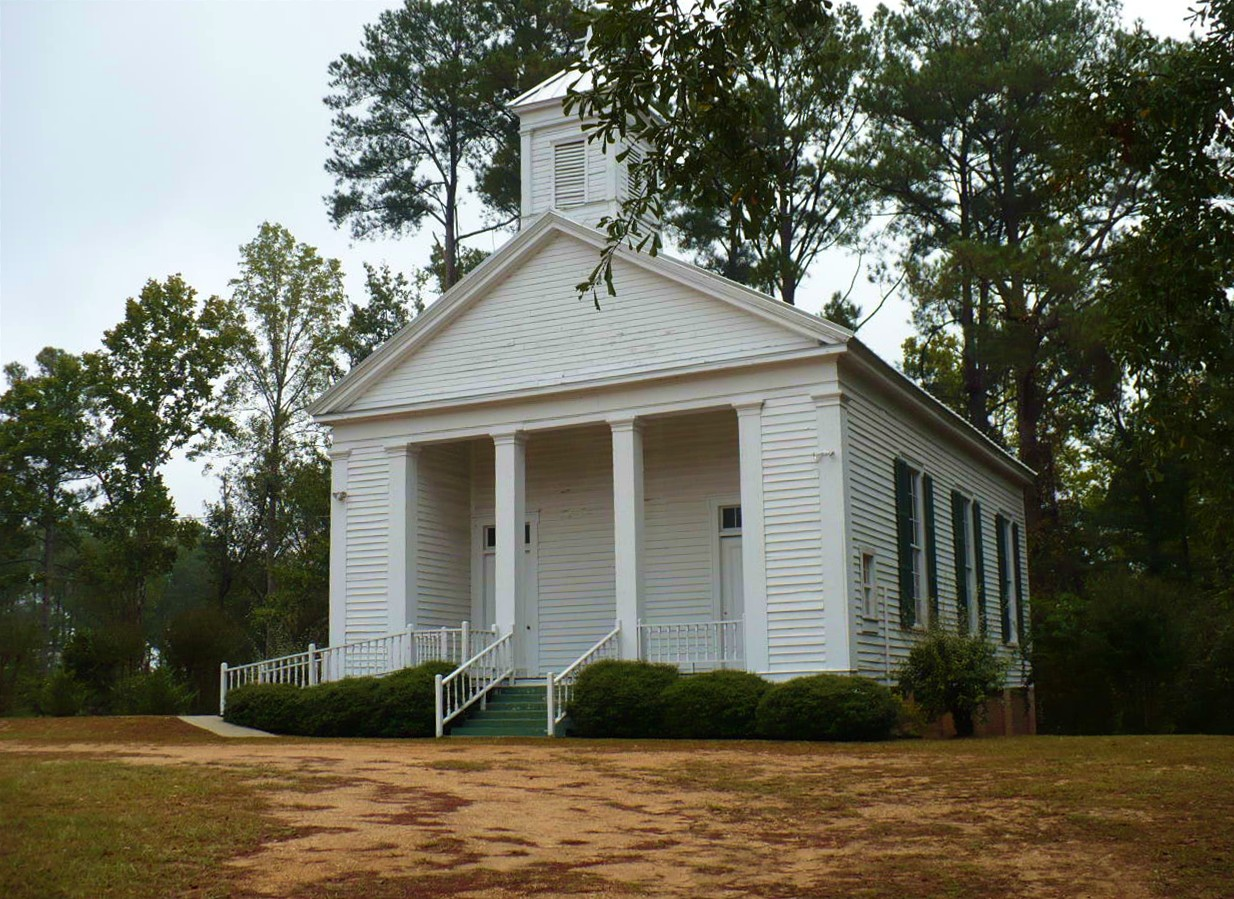
Jefferson Methodist Church (built 1856) in Jefferson. On the National Register of Historic Places as part of the Jefferson Historic District.

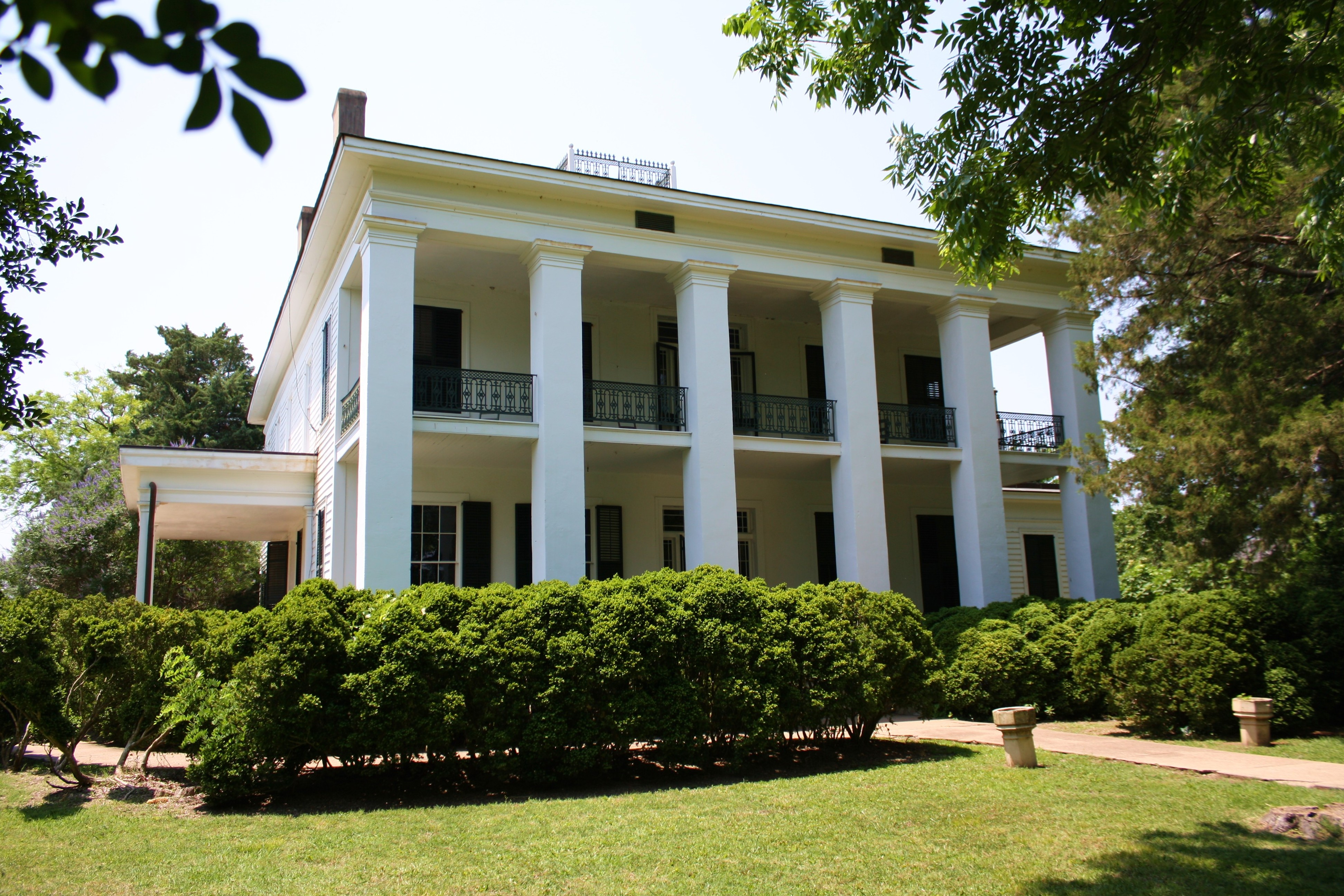
Lyon Hall (built 1853) in Demopolis. On the National Register of Historic Places.

=== Cities ===
- Demopolis
- Linden (county seat)

=== Towns ===
- Dayton
- Faunsdale
- Myrtlewood
- Providence
- Sweet Water
- Thomaston

=== Census-designated places ===
- Nanafalia
- Putnam

=== Unincorporated communities ===
- Aimwell
- Alfalfa
- Beaver Creek
- Clayhill
- Consul
- Coxheath
- Dixons Mills
- Exmoor
- Half Acre
- Half Chance
- Hampden
- Hoboken
- Hugo
- Jefferson
- Lasca
- McKinley
- Magnolia
- Marengo
- Moores Valley
- Moscow
- Nicholsville
- Octagon
- Old Spring Hill
- Pin Hook
- Pope
- Rembert
- Salt Well
- Shiloh
- Siddonsville
- Surginer
- Vangale
- Vineland
- Wayne

=== Ghost town ===
- Aigleville

== See also ==
- National Register of Historic Places listings in Marengo County, Alabama
- Properties on the Alabama Register of Landmarks and Heritage in Marengo County, Alabama
