= Clay Hill, Alabama =

Unincorporated community in Alabama, United States

- Unincorporated community
- Location within Alabama Location within the United States
- Coordinates: 32°0′59.51″N 87°45′2.02″W
- Country: United States
- State: Alabama
- County: Marengo
- Elevation: 285 ft (87 m)
- Time zone: UTC-6 (Central (CST))
  - Summer (DST): UTC-5 (CDT)
- Area code: 334

Clay Hill, also spelled Clayhill, is an unincorporated community in Marengo County, Alabama, United States. Clay Hill was established prior to the American Civil War. It had a post office at one time, but it no longer exists.

== Geography ==
Clay Hill is located at 32.01653°N 87.75056°W and has an elevation of 285 feet (87 m).
