= Jefferson Historic District (Jefferson, Alabama) =

Historic district in Alabama, United States

- U.S. National Register of Historic Places
- U.S. Historic district
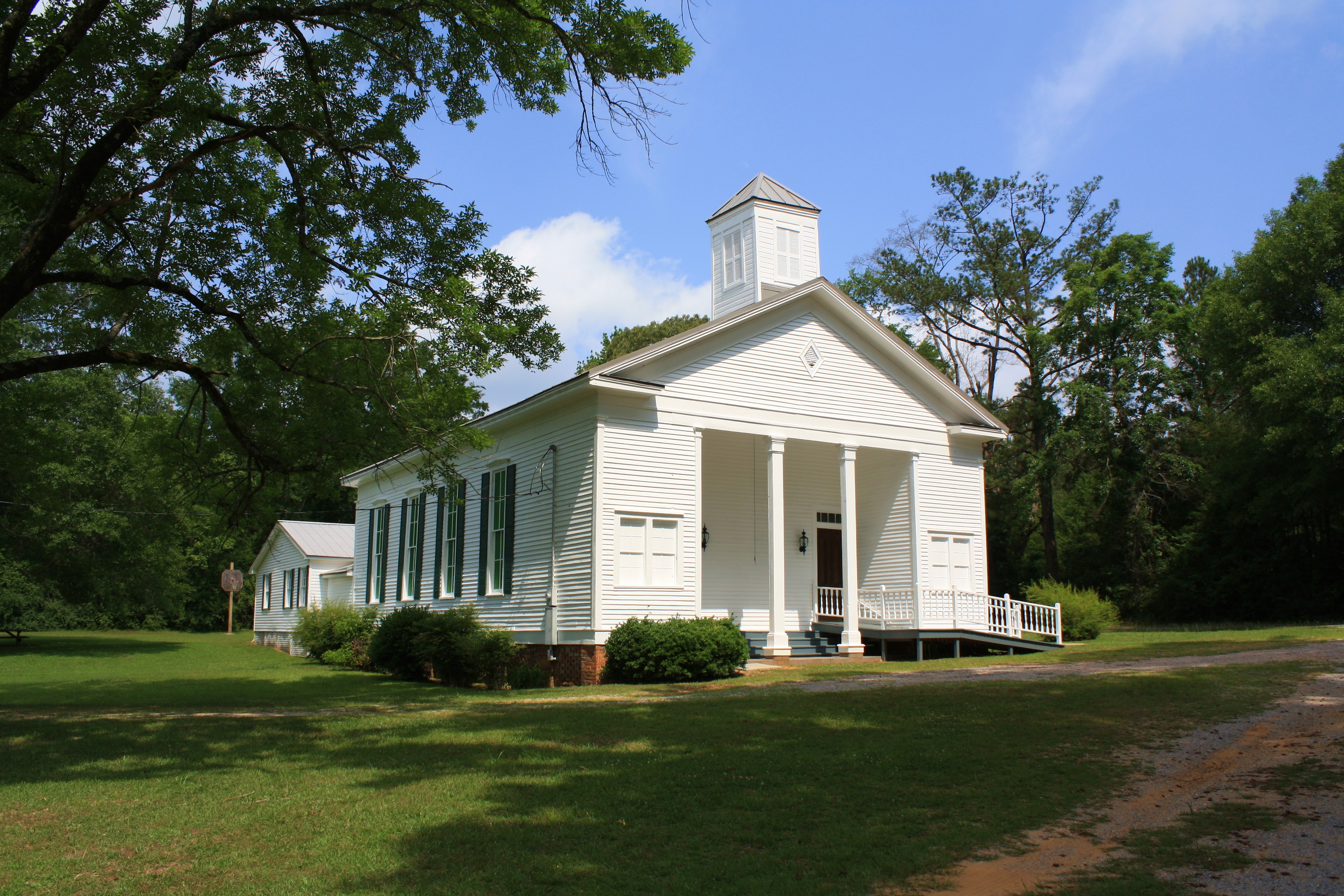
- The Jefferson Baptist Church, built in 1860

- Location within Alabama Location within the United States
- Location: AL 28, Jefferson, Alabama
- Coordinates: 32°23′8″N 87°53′53″W
- Area: 130 acres (53 ha)
- Built: 1840s-60s
- Architectural style: Greek Revival
- NRHP reference No.: 76000342
- Added to NRHP: November 13, 1976

The Jefferson Historic District is a historic district in the small community of Jefferson, Alabama, United States. The community was founded in 1810. The district consists of thirteen Greek Revival buildings that were selected for inclusion due to their significance as examples of the pre-Civil War plantation economy of the Deep South. Some of the buildings included in the district are the Lewis Simmons House (1856), James Aldridge House, Basil Grant House (1855), Dr. James Hildreth House (1848), Frederick Westbrook House (1844), W. L. Kelley House, James Richard Bryan House (1848), Jefferson Methodist Church (1856), and Jefferson Baptist Church (1860).

Examples of architecture within the Jefferson Historic District
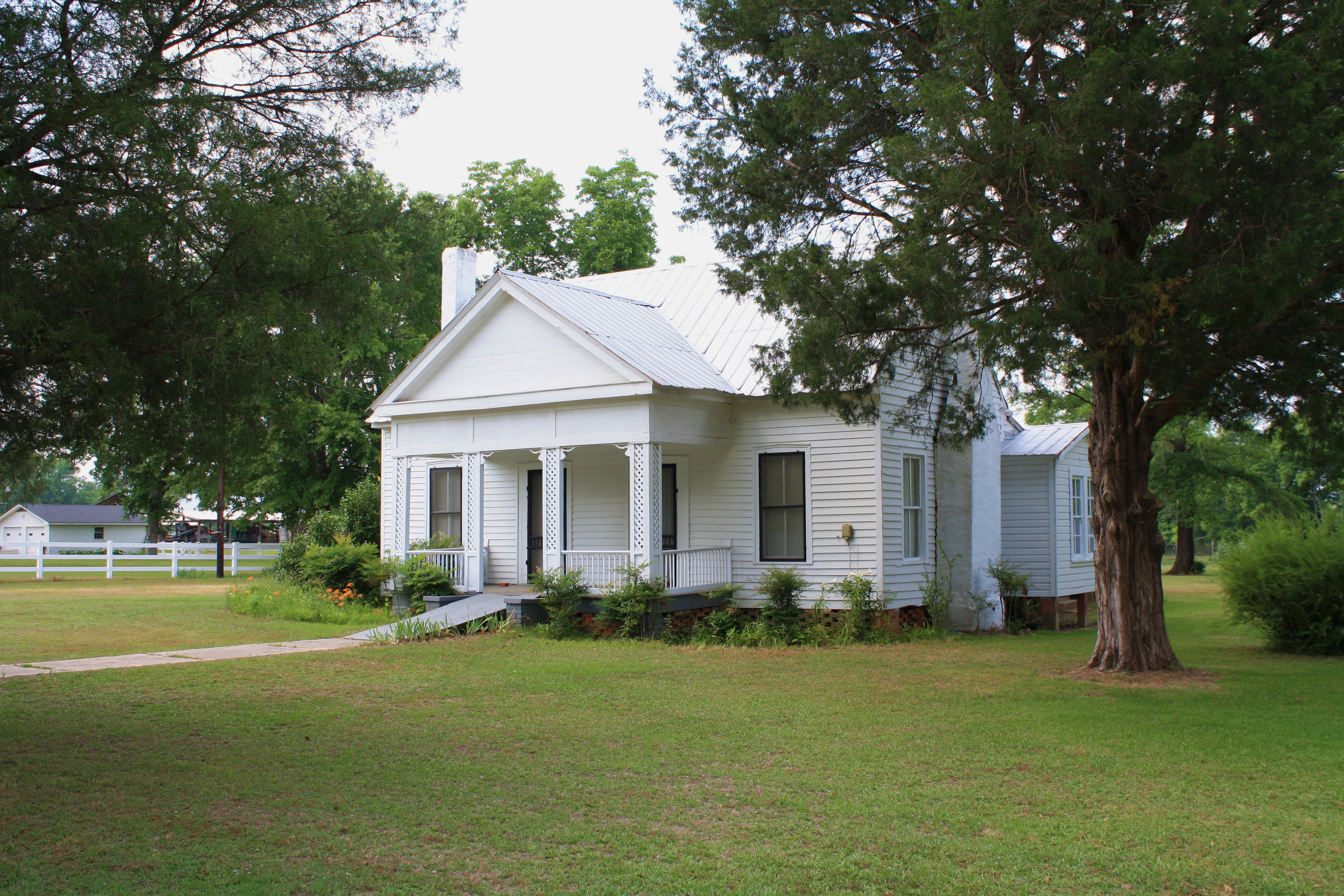
W. L. Kelley House

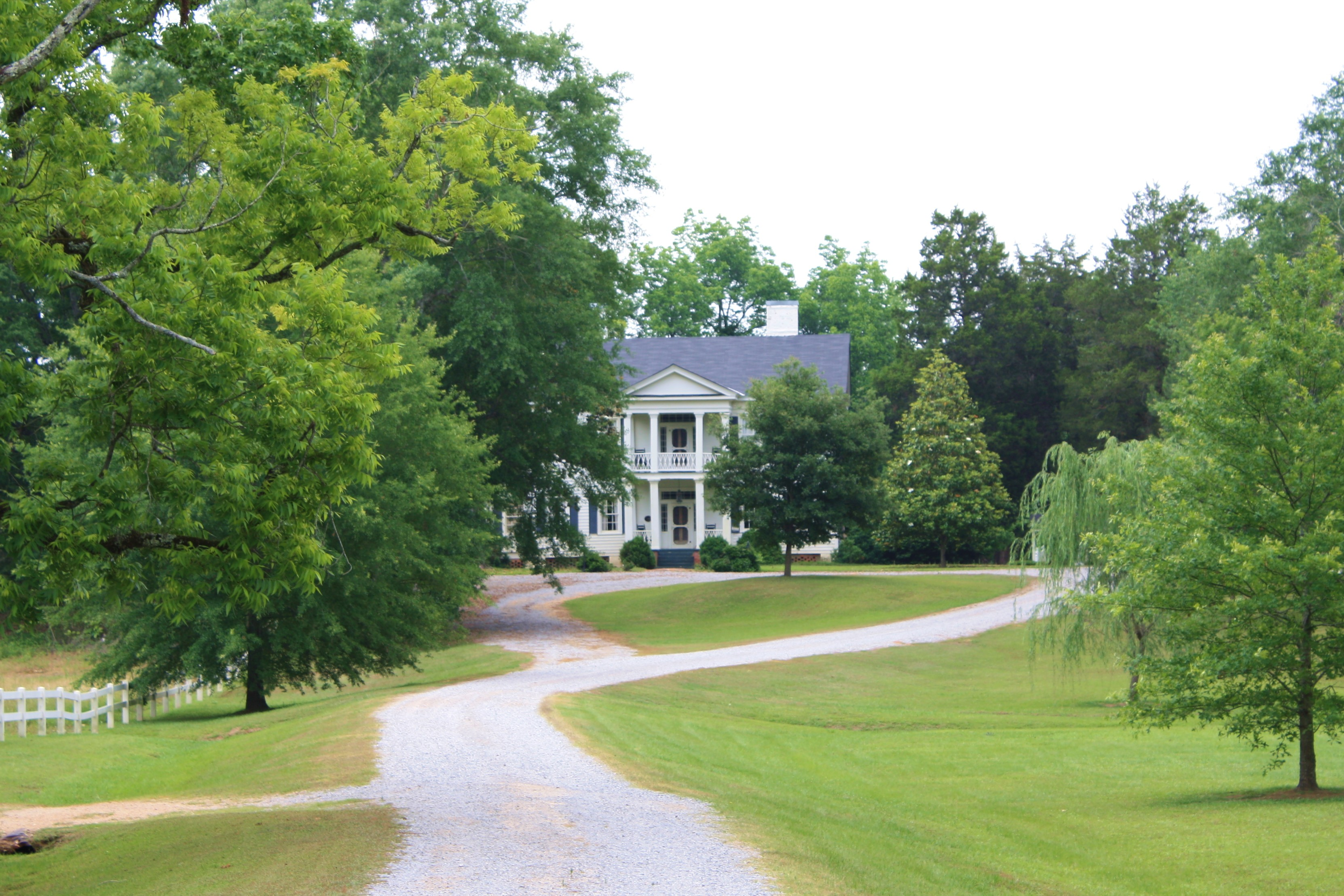
Dr. James Hildreth House

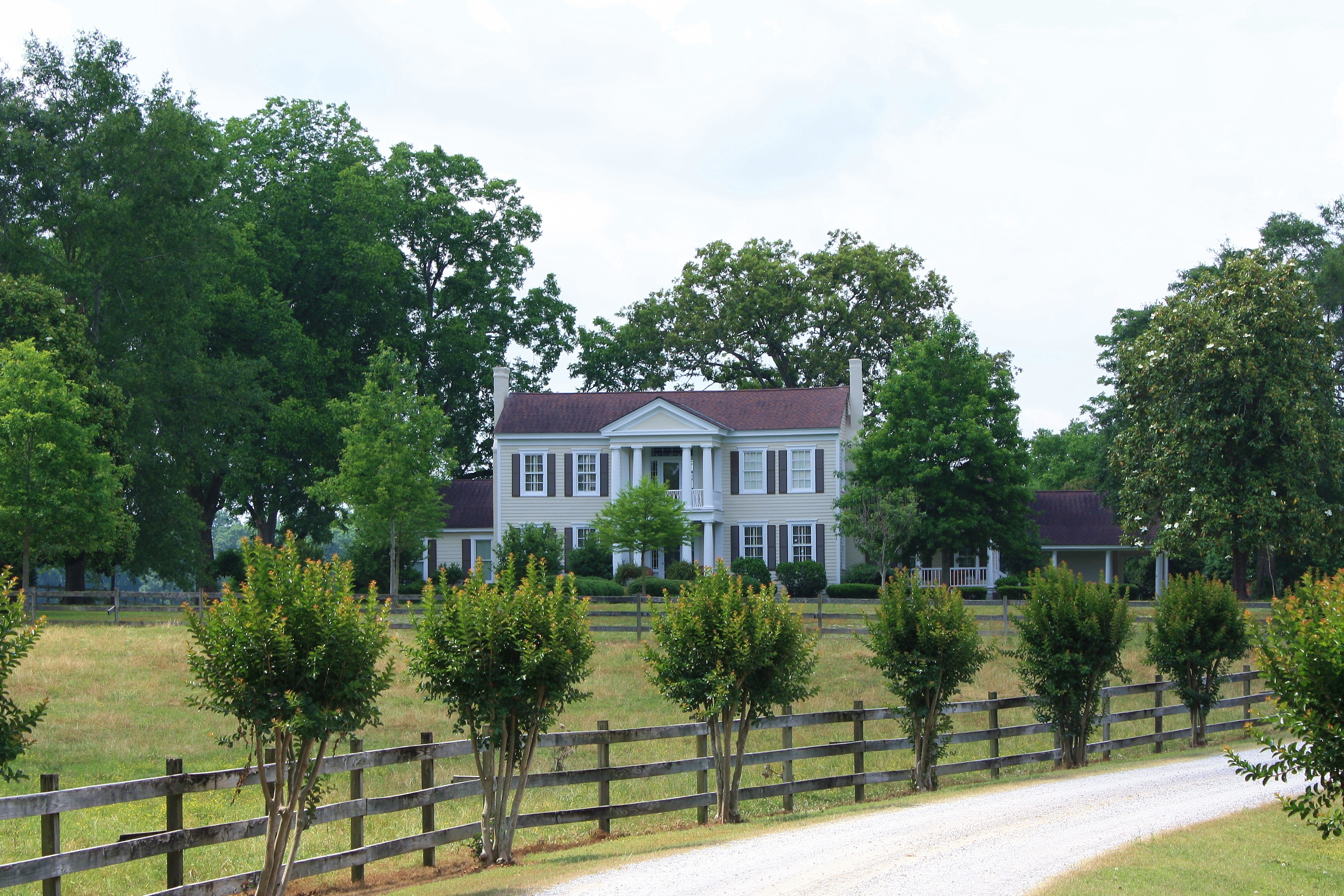
Frederick Westbrook House
