= McKinley, Alabama =

Unincorporated community in Alabama, United States

- Unincorporated community
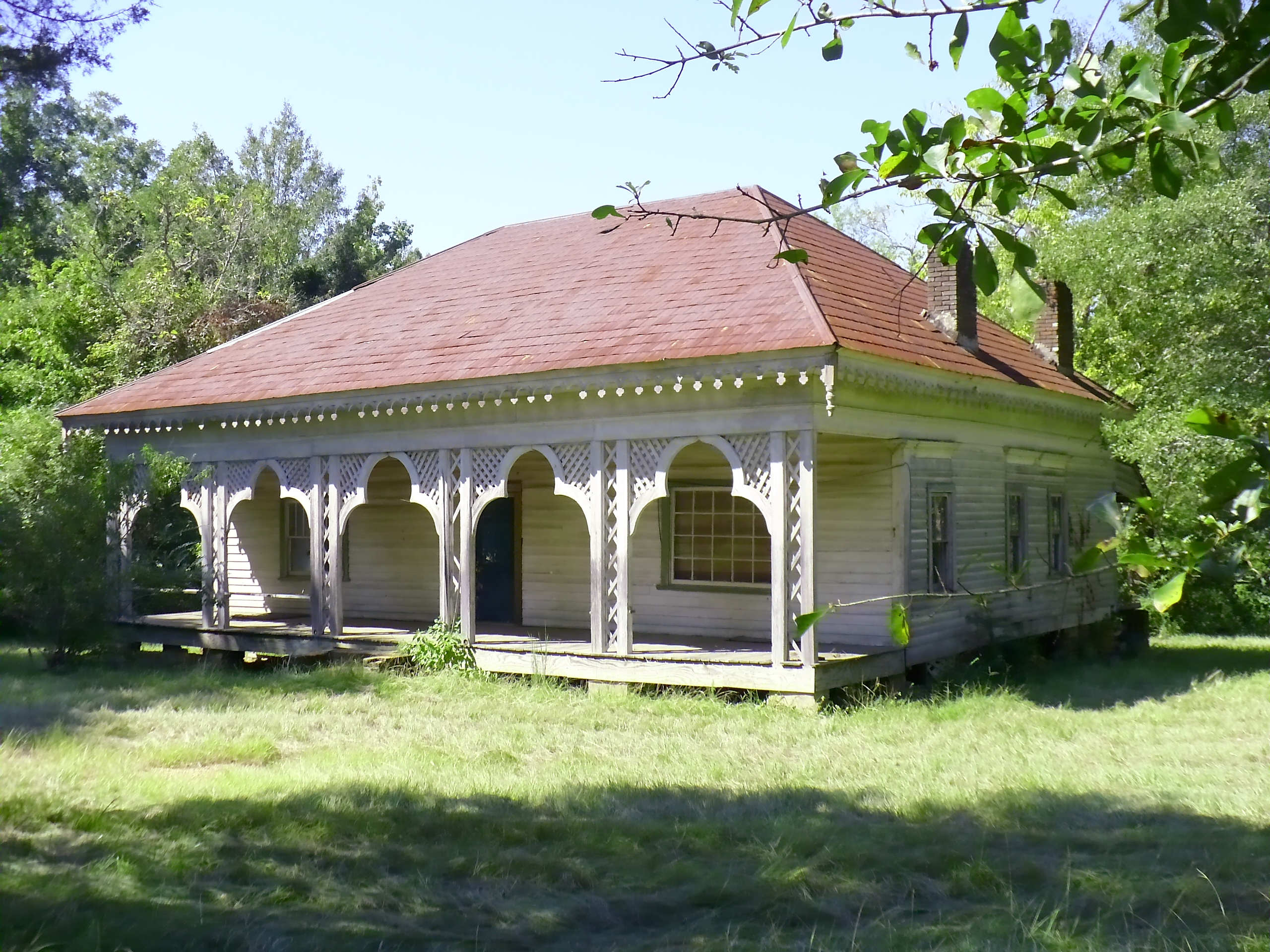
- A house at McKinley in 2008

- Location within the state of Alabama McKinley (the United States)
- Coordinates: 32°17′54.5″N 87°32′25.01″W
- Country: United States
- State: Alabama
- County: Marengo
- Elevation: 338 ft (103 m)
- Time zone: UTC-6 (Central (CST))
  - Summer (DST): UTC-5 (CDT)
- ZIP code: 36783
- Area code: 334

McKinley is an unincorporated community in Marengo County, Alabama, United States. McKinley had a post office at one time, but it no longer exists. Although a thriving community in its earliest years, it has since dwindled into obscurity.

== History ==
First known as New Ruin, the community was settled in 1815 and incorporated in 1848. The Phister Lodge #90, a masonic lodge, was granted a charter there on December 7, 1848. The name of the community was changed to McKinley in 1849 in honor of John McKinley, a U.S. Senator and Associate Justice of the United States Supreme Court.

The town grew rapidly in the 1850s and became the second largest in Marengo County, after Demopolis. Around thirty large plantations surrounded the settlement. By 1860 the community had Methodist, Baptist, and Presbyterian churches, two schools, several general stores, a brick drug store, livery stables, two-story carriage repair shop, saddle and harness shop, hotel, three shoe shops, an undertaker, tanning yard, brickyard, and grist mill.

In 1860 a fire destroyed everything on the east side of Main Street, except for the hotel. A second fire in 1869 destroyed practically the entire town. It never recovered from the combined effects of the fires, American Civil War, and a changing agricultural situation. Only the Baptist church and a few homes now remain.

== Geography ==
McKinley is located at 32.298474°N 87.54028°W and has an elevation of 338 feet (103 m).
