= Hoboken, Alabama =

Unincorporated community in Alabama, United States

- Unincorporated community
- Location within the state of Alabama Hoboken (the United States)
- Coordinates: 32°1′33.53″N 87°52′37.02″W
- Country: United States
- State: Alabama
- County: Marengo
- Elevation: 249 ft (76 m)
- Time zone: UTC-6 (Central (CST))
  - Summer (DST): UTC-5 (CDT)
- Area code: 334

Hoboken is an unincorporated community in Marengo County, Alabama, United States. A post office operated under the name Hoboken from 1877 to 1887.

== Geography ==
Hoboken is located at 32.02598°N 87.87695°W and has an elevation of 249 feet (76 m).
