= Half Chance, Alabama =

Unincorporated community in Alabama, United States

- Unincorporated community
- Location within Alabama Location within the United States
- Coordinates: 32°17′59.5″N 87°42′40.01″W
- Country: United States
- State: Alabama
- County: Marengo
- Elevation: 184 ft (56 m)
- Time zone: UTC-6 (Central (CST))
  - Summer (DST): UTC-5 (CDT)
- Area code: 334

Half Chance is an unincorporated community in Marengo County, Alabama, United States.

== Geography ==
Half Chance is located at 32.29986°N 87.72778°W and has an elevation of 184 feet (56 m).
