= Hampden, Alabama =

Unincorporated community in Alabama, United States

- Unincorporated community
- Location within Alabama Location within the United States
- Coordinates: 32°4′53.51″N 87°37′44″W
- Country: United States
- State: Alabama
- County: Marengo
- Elevation: 197 ft (60 m)
- Time zone: UTC-6 (Central (CST))
  - Summer (DST): UTC-5 (CDT)
- Area code: 334

Hampden is an unincorporated community in Marengo County, Alabama, United States. Hampden had a post office at one time, but it no longer exists.

== Demographics ==
Historical population
Census	Pop.	Note	%±
1870	40		—
U.S. Decennial Census

Hampden appeared on the 1870 U.S. Census as having 40 residents. Of those 40, 36 (90%) were black and 4 (10%) were white. This was the only time it was listed on the census.

== Geography ==
Hampden is located at 32.08153°N 87.62889°W and has an elevation of 197 feet (60 m).
