= Putnam, Alabama =

Unincorporated community in Alabama, United States

- Census-designated place
- Coordinates: 32°00′24″N 88°02′08″W
- Country: United States
- State: Alabama
- County: Marengo

Area
  - Total: 9.48 sq mi (24.6 km^{2})
  - Land: 9.48 sq mi (24.6 km^{2})
  - Water: 0.00 sq mi (0 km^{2})
- Elevation: 151 ft (46 m)

Population (2020)
  - Total: 172
  - Density: 18.13/sq mi (7.00/km^{2})
- Time zone: UTC-6 (Central (CST))
  - Summer (DST): UTC-5 (CDT)
- Area code: 334
- FIPS code: 01-62952
- GNIS feature ID: 2628603

Putnam is an unincorporated community and census-designated place (CDP) in southwest Marengo County, Alabama, United States. As of the 2020 census, its population was 172.

== Geography ==
Putnam is located in the southwest corner of Marengo County, along Alabama State Route 69. It is 28 miles (45 km) southwest of Linden, the county seat, and 24 miles (39 km) north of Coffeeville.

According to the U.S. Census Bureau, the Putnam CDP has an area of 9.5 square miles (25 km^{2}), all of it recorded as land. It is bordered to the north by Horse Creek and to the south by Big Bunny Creek, west-flowing tributaries of the Tombigbee River.

== Demographics ==
Historical population
Census	Pop.	Note	%±
2010	193		—
2020	172		−10.9%
U.S. Decennial Census

Putnam was listed as a census designated place in the 2010 U.S. census.

Putnam CDP, Alabama – Racial and ethnic composition Note: the US Census treats Hispanic/Latino as an ethnic category. This table excludes Latinos from the racial categories and assigns them to a separate category. Hispanics/Latinos may be of any race.
Race / Ethnicity (NH = Non-Hispanic)	Pop 2010	Pop 2020	% 2010	% 2020
White alone (NH)	45	42	23.32%	24.42%
Black or African American alone (NH)	140	114	72.54%	66.28%
Native American or Alaska Native alone (NH)	5	0	2.59%	0.00%
Asian alone (NH)	0	0	0.00%	0.00%
Native Hawaiian or Pacific Islander alone (NH)	0	0	0.00%	0.00%
Other race alone (NH)	0	8	0.00%	4.65%
Mixed race or Multiracial (NH)	3	7	1.55%	4.07%
Hispanic or Latino (any race)	0	1	0.00%	0.58%
Total	193	172	100.00%	100.00%

As of the 2010 United States census, there were 193 people living in the CDP. The racial makeup of the CDP was 72.5% Black, 23.3% White, 2.6% Native American and 1.6% from two or more races.
