= Surginer, Alabama =

Unincorporated community in Alabama, United States

- Unincorporated community
- Location within the state of Alabama Surginer (the United States)
- Coordinates: 32°3′18″N 87°42′32.4″W
- Country: United States
- State: Alabama
- County: Marengo
- Elevation: 259 ft (79 m)
- Time zone: UTC-6 (Central (CST))
  - Summer (DST): UTC-5 (CDT)
- Area code: 334

Surginer is an unincorporated community in Marengo County, Alabama, United States. Surginer had a post office at one time, but it no longer exists.

== Geography ==
Surginer is located at 32.055°N 87.709°W and has an elevation of 259 feet (79 m).
