= National Register of Historic Places listings in Wilcox County, Alabama =

Location of Wilcox County in Alabama

This is a list of the National Register of Historic Places listings in Wilcox County, Alabama.

This is intended to be a complete list of the properties and districts on the National Register of Historic Places in Wilcox County, Alabama, United States. Latitude and longitude coordinates are provided for many National Register properties and districts; these locations may be seen together in a Google map.

There are 15 properties and districts listed on the National Register in the county.

This National Park Service list is complete through NPS recent listings posted September 4, 2026.

== Current listings ==
	Name on the Register	Image	Date listed	Location	City or town	Description
1	Ackerville Baptist Church of Christ	Ackerville Baptist Church of Christ	April 18, 2003 (#03000228)	State Route 89; 32°01′54″N 87°04′06″W	Ackerville	Greek Revival-style church, built in 1848.
2	William King Beck House	William King Beck House	May 21, 1993 (#93000421)	Northern side of State Route 28, 3.2 mi (5.1 km) north of its junction with State Route 10; 32°02′44″N 87°20′07″W	Camden	Plantation along the Alabama River near Camden. The main house was built in 1845 for William King Beck, nephew of William R. King. King was the 13th Vice President of the United States.
3	Tristram Bethea House	Tristram Bethea House	July 11, 1985 (#85001501)	State Route 28 and County Road 22; 32°03′14″N 87°21′00″W	Canton Bend	Federal style plantation house, built in 1842 for Tristram Bethea. It was the first brick house in the county.
4	Dry Forks Plantation	Dry Forks Plantation	February 26, 1999 (#99000250)	East of State Route 41, 5.5 mi (8.9 km) southwest of Camden; 31°54′07″N 87°21′39″W	Coy	Federal style plantation house, built from 1832 to 1834 for James Asbury Tait by skilled slave artisans.
5	Furman Historic District	Furman Historic District	May 13, 1999 (#99000249)	Roughly along Old Snow Hill Rd., County Road 59, Burson Rd., and State Route 21; 32°00′11″N 86°58′02″W	Furman	Historic district that encompasses most of the community and includes a wide variety of 19th century buildings.
6	Hawthorn House	Hawthorn House	March 7, 1985 (#85000452)	9 N. Broad St. 31°52′48″N 86°59′21″W	Pine Apple	Greek Revival style plantation house, built for Joseph Richard Hawthorne in 1854.
7	Liberty Hall	Liberty Hall	January 5, 1984 (#84000751)	State Route 221; 31°58′22″N 87°20′07″W	Camden	Greek Revival plantation house, built for John Robert McDowell in 1855.
8	Liddell Archeological Site	Liddell Archeological Site	November 17, 1978 (#78000511)	Address Restricted	Camden	Prehistoric Native American archaeological site with evidence of human occupation from 9000 BC to 1800 AD. Best known for its Burial Urn culture artifacts.
9	Oak Hill Historic District	Oak Hill Historic District	June 26, 1998 (#98000711)	Area around the junction of State Routes 10 and 21; 31°55′19″N 87°05′01″W	Oak Hill	Historic district containing architectural styles ranging from the various mid-19th century revivals to the Victorian.
10	Pine Apple Historic District	Pine Apple Historic District	February 26, 1999 (#99000248)	Roughly along Old Depot, County Roads 59, 7, and 61, Broad St., Banana St., State Route 10, and Adams Dr. 31°52′14″N 86°59′22″W	Pine Apple	Historic district containing architectural styles ranging from the Craftsman to the Colonial Revival.
11	Prairie Mission	Prairie Mission	October 29, 2001 (#01001171)	¼ mile southeast of the junction of State Route 28 and McCall Rd. 32°08′30″N 87°25′40″W	Catherine	Mission school for African Americans that was founded by the Freedman's Board of the United Presbyterian Church of North America in 1885.
12	Snow Hill Normal and Industrial Institute	Snow Hill Normal and Industrial Institute	February 24, 1995 (#95000146)	Northern side of County Road 26, northwest of Snow Hill; 32°01′14″N 87°01′59″W	Snow Hill	African American school founded in 1893 by Dr. William J. Edwards, a graduate of Tuskegee University. It grew over time until, at its height, it included a campus of 27 buildings, a staff of 35, and over 400 students.
13	Tait-Ervin House	Tait-Ervin House	February 24, 1995 (#95000147)	205 County Road 33; 31°58′19″N 87°22′38″W	Camden	Plantation house built for Robert Tait in 1855. It features a one-story Carolina porch and elaborate interior plasterwork.
14	Wilcox County Courthouse Historic District	Wilcox County Courthouse Historic District	January 18, 1979 (#79000405)	Irregular pattern along Broad St. 31°59′28″N 87°17′21″W	Camden	Historic district, centered on the Wilcox County Courthouse, that features a wide variety of 19th and early 20th century architectural styles.
15	Wilcox Female Institute	Wilcox Female Institute	April 3, 1975 (#75000330)	Church St. 31°59′40″N 87°17′40″W	Camden	Greek Revival style school building, built 1845 to 1850 as a boarding school for girls.

== See also ==
- List of National Historic Landmarks in Alabama
- National Register of Historic Places listings in Alabama
