= Pine Apple Historic District =

Historic district in Alabama, United States

- U.S. National Register of Historic Places
- U.S. Historic district
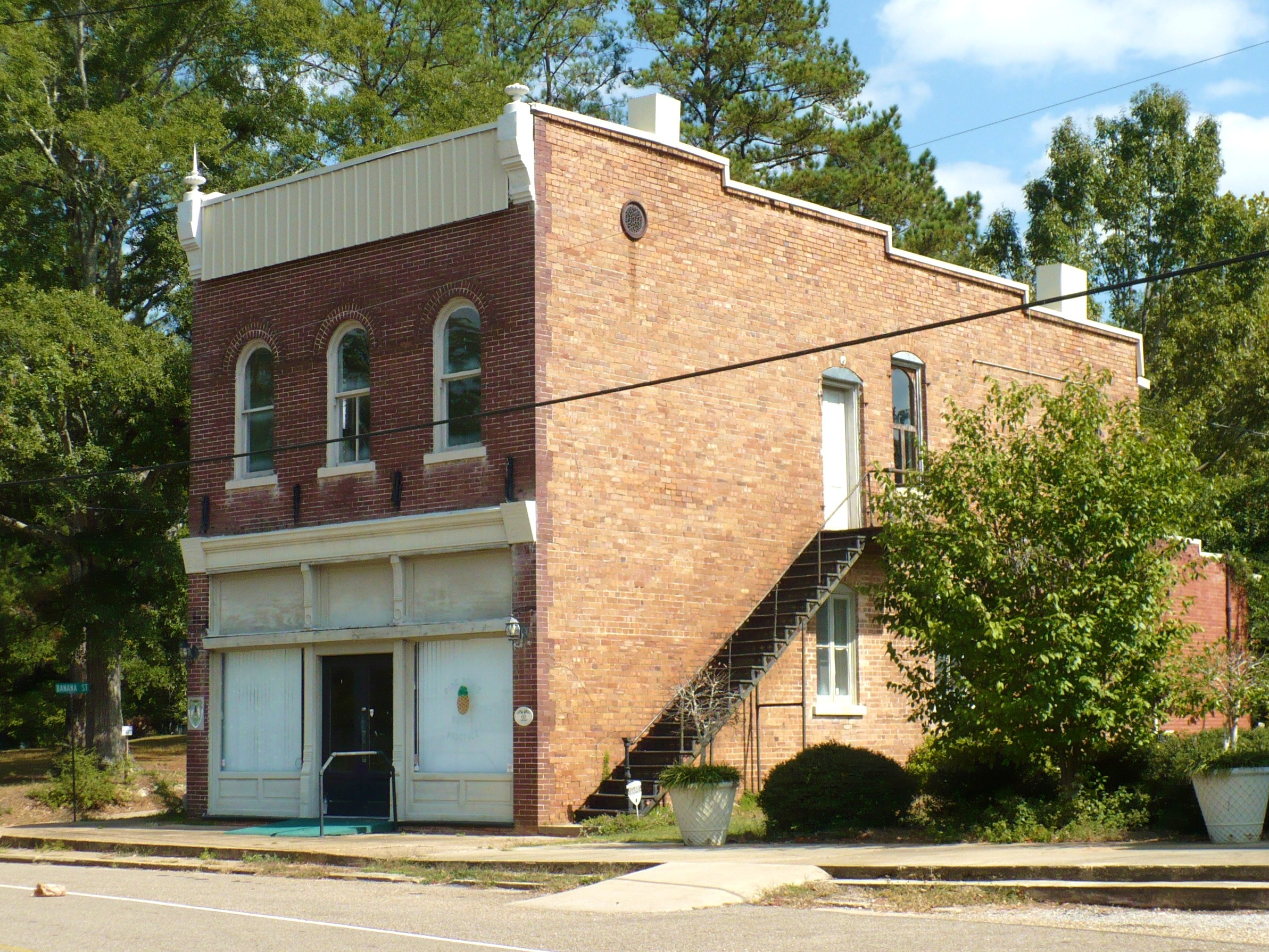
- The Bank of Pine Apple building, now used as an art gallery

- Location within Alabama Location within the United States
- Location: Pine Apple, Alabama
- Coordinates: 31°52′14″N 86°59′22″W
- Architectural style: Bungalow/Craftsman, Colonial Revival
- NRHP reference No.: 99000248
- Added to NRHP: February 26, 1999

The Pine Apple Historic District is a historic district in the community of Pine Apple, Alabama. It was placed on the National Register of Historic Places on February 26, 1999. The boundaries are roughly Wilcox County roads 59, 7 and 61, Broad Street, Banana Street, AL 10, and Adams Drive. It contains 3,350 acres (1,360 ha), 54 buildings, and one structure ranging from the Craftsman to Colonial Revival styles.

== List of contributing properties ==
- Hawthorne House (1854), Broad Street; NRHP-listed
- Nathan Adams – J.D. Steen House (c. 1885)
- Purifoy–Melton House (c. 1840, moved in 1938)
- Moore Academy (1923), Broad Street
- Pine Apple Methodist Church and Cemetery (c. 1890)
- Pine Apple Central Hotel (c. 1900)
- Pine Apple Public Library (c. 1990), Broad Street
- Pine Apple Town Hall (c. 1960), Broad Street
- Pine Apple Post Office (c. 1965), Broad Street
- Matheson Community Library (c. 1927), Broad Street
- Adams Cemetery (c. 1870)
- Christian Church Cemetery (late-19th century), Broad Street
- Friendship Baptist Church (1949), Wilcox Co. Road 59; the church was established in 1898, the building was replaced in 1949
- Friendship Baptist Church Cemetery (mid-19th century), Wilcox Co. Road 59

== See also ==
- National Register of Historic Places listings in Wilcox County, Alabama
