= Alexander J. Bragg =

Alexander J. Bragg was born in Warrenton, North Carolina on June 14, 1815, and was buried in Camden, Alabama on December 11, 1877. He married Nancy Arrington in 1839 in Sumter County, Alabama and he married a second time in 1848 to Martha Nunnellee. His brothers were Confederate general Braxton Bragg, Mobile, Alabama Congressional politician, John Bragg (politician), and Thomas Bragg, governor of North Carolina (1855 - 1859) and United States Senator (1859 - 1861). He had one child with Nancy Arrington and seven more with Martha Nunnellee.

He was an architect. His works included the Camden, Alabama courthouse (Wilcox County Courthouse Historic District), William King Beck House in Wilcox County, Alabama, and Bragg-Mitchell Mansion in Mobile, Alabama.
