= Senator Alston =

Senator Alston may refer to:

- Lela Alston (born 1942), Arizona State Senate
- Richard Alston (politician) (born 1941), Australian Senate
- William J. Alston (1800–1876), Alabama State Senate
- Willis Alston (1769–1837), North Carolina State Senate
