= Wilcox County Courthouse =

Wilcox County Courthouse may refer to:

- Wilcox County Courthouse (Alabama), Camden, Alabama
- Wilcox County Courthouse (Georgia), Abbeville, Georgia
