= Moore Academy =

School in Wilcox County, Alabama, US

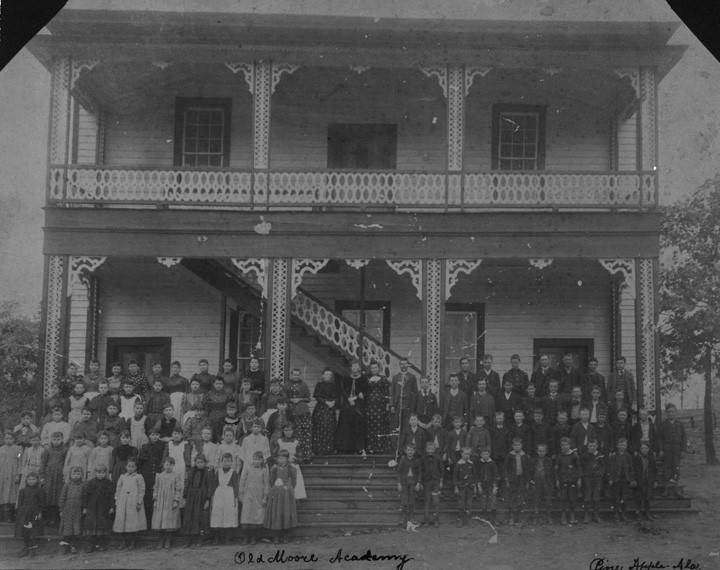
- Photograph of students in front of Moore Academy, 1890s
- Interactive map of Moore Academy
- 31.867309°N 86.989988°W
- Location: Broad Street, Pine Apple, Wilcox County, Alabama, U.S.

History
- Dates active: 1883–1989
- Built: 1923

Alabama Register of Landmarks and Heritage
- Designated: June 30, 1995

Moore Academy (1883–1989), also known as Moore Academy School, was a primary school in Pine Apple, Alabama, U.S.. The school was founded in 1883 by John Trotwood Moore, a journalist and local historian. It existed as a segregated school for white students until around 1970, when the school became racially integrated.

There is a historical marker for the school, erected in 1996 by Alabama Historical Commission and by the Moore Academy Alumni Association, Inc.. It is listed as an Alabama Register of Landmarks and Heritage since June 30, 1995. The building for the school was built in 1923, and is part of the NRHP-listed Pine Apple Historic District.

Notable alumni include football player Fred Cone.

== See also ==
- Segregation academy
