= Bragg–Mitchell Mansion =

Historic house in Alabama, United States

- Bragg–Mitchell House
- U.S. National Register of Historic Places
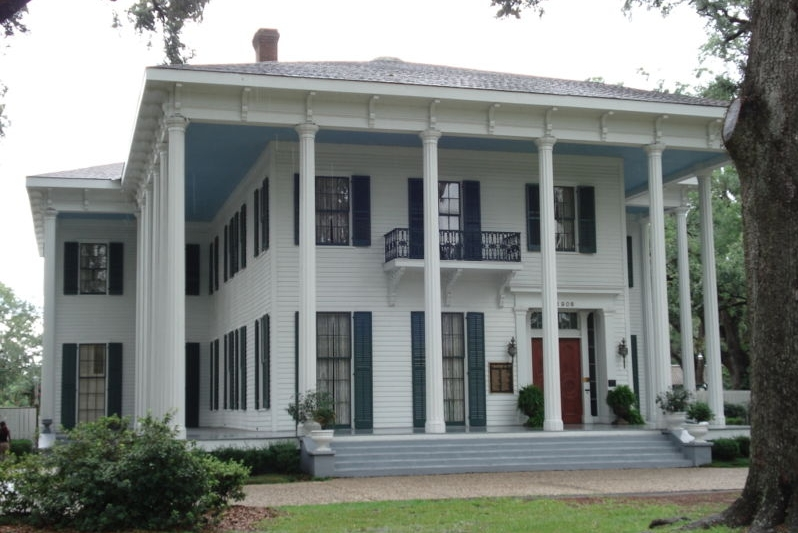
- The Bragg–Mitchell House

- Location within Mobile, Alabama Location within Alabama Location within the United States
- Location: 1906 Springhill Avenue; Mobile, Alabama
- Coordinates: 30°41′33″N 88°5′10″W
- Area: 3 acres (1.2 ha)
- Built: 1855
- Architect: Alexander J. Bragg
- Architectural style: Greek Revival, with Italianate influences
- NRHP reference No.: 72000168
- Added to NRHP: September 27, 1972

The Bragg–Mitchell Mansion, also known as the Bragg–Mitchell House, is a historic house museum in Mobile, Alabama. It was built in 1855 by Judge John Bragg and is one of the most photographed buildings in the city as well as one of the more popular tourist attractions. The house has been attributed to John's brother, a local Alabama architect, Alexander J. Bragg.

== History ==
John Bragg was born near Warrenton, North Carolina. He graduated from the University of North Carolina at Chapel Hill in 1824, where he studied law. He was admitted to the bar in 1830 and moved to Mobile in 1836, where he continued the practice of law. He was appointed judge to Alabama's 10th Judicial Circuit in 1842, later leaving that post after being elected to the 32nd United States Congress. He bought the property at 1906 Springhill Avenue on 10 May 1855 for the sum of $7500 and began construction of the house that continues to stand there today.

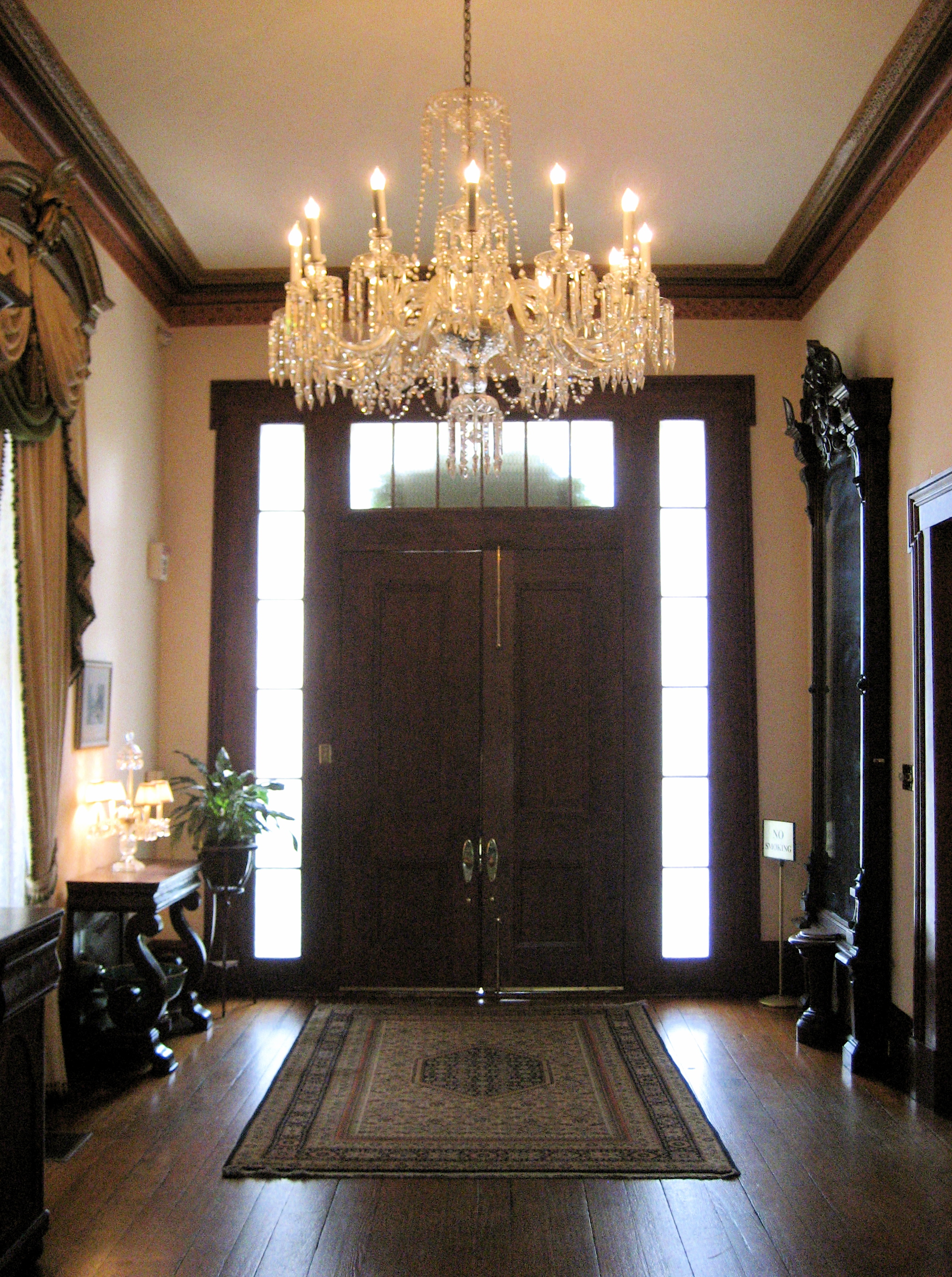
The first floor hallway, looking toward the entrance doors.

Two notable events in the history of the mansion occurred during the American Civil War. The first was the cutting of all of the live oak trees on the property to give the Confederate defenders of Mobile free range to shell any approaching Union troops. The second event was the removal of all of the furnishings from the mansion during the war to Bragg's plantation in Lowndes County. That plantation and all of the furnishings were subsequently burned when Wilson's Raiders went through that area, the irony being that Mobile itself never became a battleground as had been anticipated. John Bragg died in Mobile on 10 August 1878 and was interred in Magnolia Cemetery.

The house remained in the Bragg family until 1880 when it was bought by William H. Pratt. John's brother, Confederate General Braxton Bragg, is often credited with owning the property after John Bragg's death, but this is not the case. He was a frequent guest at the house during John Bragg's lifetime and he did live on the property for a short time after the Civil War, while supervising the construction of jetties at the mouth of Mobile Bay, however. The property passed through the Upham, Davis, and Wingate families before it was purchased by A.S. Mitchell in 1924.

== Description ==
The house is two-stories and built on a T-shaped plan. The architecture is in the Greek Revival style with tall, spindly columns that are derivative of the Doric order around a three-sided veranda. The bracketed cornice indicates some Italianate influence, a fusion of stylistic elements that some have dubbed a "bracketed Greek Revival". It contains fourteen rooms, with seven of those being bedrooms. The ground floor features 15-foot (4.6 m) ceilings.
