= Fred Cone (American football) =

American football player (1926–2021)

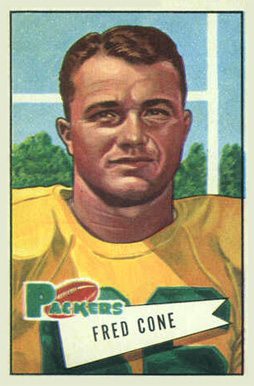
- Cone on a 1952 Bowman football card

No. 66, 31
- Positions: Fullback, placekicker

Personal information
- Born: June 21, 1926; Pine Apple, Alabama, U.S.
- Died: December 31, 2021 (aged 95); Seneca, South Carolina, U.S.
- Listed height: 5 ft 11 in (1.80 m)
- Listed weight: 199 lb (90 kg)

Career information
- High school: Moore Academy (Pine Apple)
- College: Clemson
- NFL draft: 1951: 3rd round, 27th overall pick

Career history
- Green Bay Packers (1951–1957); Dallas Cowboys (1960)

Awards and highlights
- Green Bay Packers Hall of Fame; 2× First-team All-Southern (1949, 1950)

Career NFL statistics
- Rushing yards: 1,156
- Rushing average: 3.3
- Receptions: 75
- Receiving yards: 852
- Total touchdowns: 16
- Stats at Pro Football Reference

Fred Cone (June 21, 1926 – December 31, 2021) was an American professional football player who was a fullback and placekicker in the National Football League (NFL) for the Green Bay Packers and Dallas Cowboys. He played college football for the Clemson Tigers. He was inducted into the Green Bay Packers Hall of Fame.

== Early life ==
Cone grew up in Pine Apple, Alabama, with a population around 100. He attended Moore Academy, a rural school from primary school through high school. He did not play football because there were not enough people to field a team.

Before going to college, he enlisted in the U.S. Army to take part of World War II, where he served in the Pacific as part of the 11th Airborne Division.

== College career ==
When he returned to the United States] in the summer of 1946, he read a newspaper advertisement about tryouts at Auburn University and decided to attend. His participation was cut short with an ankle injury that forced him to return home.

During his recovery, a family friend turned out to be the sister of Frank Howard, the head coach at Clemson College. She helped Cone get a tryout and eventually he was able to make the team and receive a scholarship.

As a sophomore with the Tigers, Cone was the starting fullback in a backfield that included Ray Mathews. The 1948 team accomplished a 10–0 undefeated season and beat the University of Missouri, 24–23, in the 1949 Gator Bowl. He scored two first-quarter touchdowns and had a critical fourth down conversion late in the game. He finished as the team's leading rusher with 635 yards and 7 touchdowns. Cone was mentioned in the Jerry Clower 1974 album Country Ham which mentioned Clower's 1948 Mississippi State Bulldogs football team (then Maroons) playing Clemson in which Clower was assigned to tackle Cone and missed.

As a junior, he registered 703 rushing yards and 9 touchdowns.

As a senior, his 184 carries for 845 rushing yards, 15 touchdowns and 92 points at the time were all school season records. He also was a part of another undefeated season and against Auburn University, he rushed for 163 yards and scored 4 touchdowns. He played in the 1951 Orange Bowl, beating the University of Miami 15–14. He gained 81 rushing yards, scored one of the touchdowns, returned one kickoff and had 4 punts.

Cone finished his college career with eight 100-yard career rushing games, 31 touchdowns and 189 points. He also was a kickoff specialist.

In 1973, he was inducted into the State of South Carolina Athletic Hall of Fame and the Clemson Athletic Hall of Fame. He is a member of Clemson's Ring of Honor.

== Professional career ==
=== Green Bay Packers ===
Cone was selected by the Green Bay Packers in the third round (27th overall) of the 1951 NFL draft. He was used as a fullback and placekicker.

As a rookie, he led the team with 50 points, and was the second-leading rusher with 56 carries for 190 yards (3.4-yard average). He also made 5 of 7 field goal attempts and 29 of 35 extra points.

Cone led the Packers in scoring in five of the next six seasons, including leading the league with 16 field goals made in 1955. In 1956, he announced his retirement, but was convinced by the team to return to play.

In 1957, he was a part of the inaugural game at Lambeau Field, then known as City Stadium, contributing to an upset of the Chicago Bears 21–17, before a crowd of 32,132 people. He finished the season by leading his team in scoring with 74 points.

Cone played for the Packers during a low point in the franchise history, never experiencing a winning season, which cost him the opportunity to earn more accolades for his play.

In 1974, he was inducted into the Green Bay Packers Hall of Fame.

=== Dallas Cowboys ===
On May 12, 1960, he was signed as a free agent by the Dallas Cowboys after being out of football for two years, while coaching at University Military School in Mobile, Alabama. He became the first starter at placekicker in franchise history. He also was a backup fullback and reunited with former college teammate Ray Mathews. He retired after the season.

== Personal life and death ==
In his first two years in the NFL, he worked for the Packers during the offseason promoting season-ticket sales. He later accepted a job promoting beer with the Miller Brewing Company. He was an assistant football coach at the University Military School in Mobile, Alabama.

In 1961, he joined the Clemson football coaching staff. He also worked for the Clemson athletic department as their chief football recruiter in the 1960s.

Country comedian Jerry Clower, who played football at Mississippi State University, recounted his experience facing Cone on the field in his story "The Time We Played Clemson".

Cone died of complications from a broken hip in Seneca, South Carolina, on December 31, 2021, at the age of 95.
