= Wilcox Female Institute =

- U.S. National Register of Historic Places
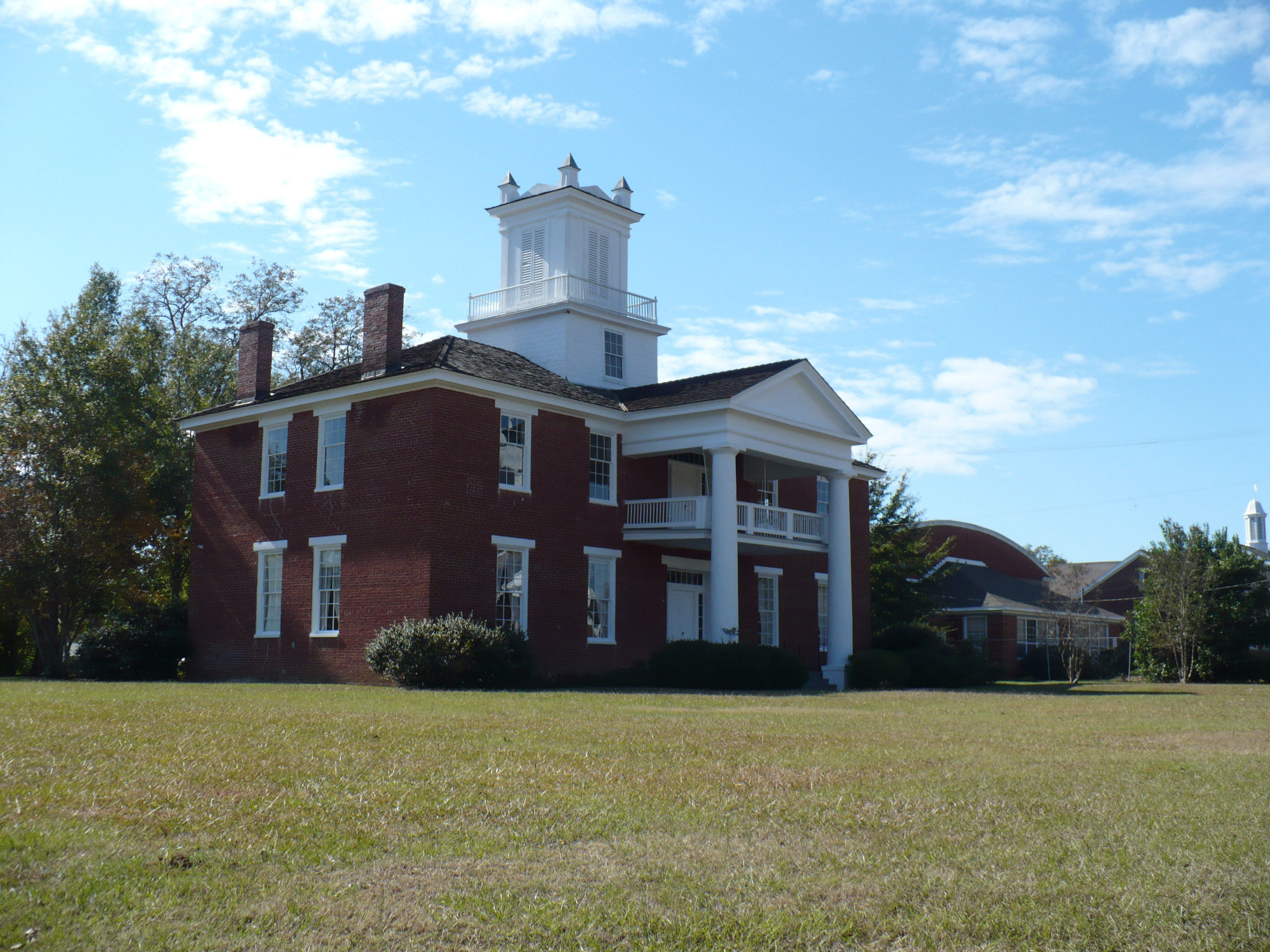
- The front elevation of the Wilcox Female Institute in 2008.

- Location within Alabama Location within the United States
- Location: Camden, Alabama, U.S.
- Coordinates: 31°59′40″N 87°17′40″W
- Built: 1845–1850
- Architectural style: Greek Revival
- NRHP reference No.: 75000330
- Added to NRHP: April 3, 1975

The Wilcox Female Institute is a historic Greek Revival-style school building in Camden, Alabama. The two-story brick structure was built between 1845 and 1850 as a boarding school for girls. The school closed in 1910 and the building was then used by the Wilcox County school system for over 50 years. It was acquired by the Wilcox Historical Society in 1976. The group made it into their official headquarters. It was placed on the National Register of Historic Places on April 3, 1975.

== History ==
=== Wilcox Female Institute ===
The Wilcox Female Institute is the oldest educational landmark in this section of Alabama, and is one of the better known early Alabama institutions for the education of women. The school had its beginning in 1848 when a group of citizens from the area made up subscriptions for the establishment of a school for young ladies. By 1850 the institute had been incorporated, a faculty employed, a catalog published and the building completed. Records show in the fall of 1850, the school had an enrollment of 250, with a primary department, a music department, a department of fine arts and embroidery, and a department of French language. The original school trustees were Col. J. C. Jones, D. W. Sterrett, Col, C. C. Sellers, Joseph George, Major M. M. Bonham, Dr. M. Reid, J. W. Bridges, Dr. Robert Irvin, and Major F. K. Beck.

Records of the school indicate that it remained in operation throughout the American Civil War (1861–1865), and in 1866 the property was sold to John Miller, an associate reformed Presbyterian minister and educator who conducted the school for a period of seven years. After Miller relinquished leadership of the Institute, it continued in operation as a private school under a series of principals until 1908 when it was deeded to the State of Alabama for use as a county high school.

=== Wilcox County School District ===
Public high school classes were conducted in the building until 1937 when the new high school building, located on adjoining lot, was completed. After that time only two rooms in the downstairs of the building were used for elementary school classes, and after 1965 the building was used only for band practice.

As recorded by the Historic American Buildings Survey in 1937
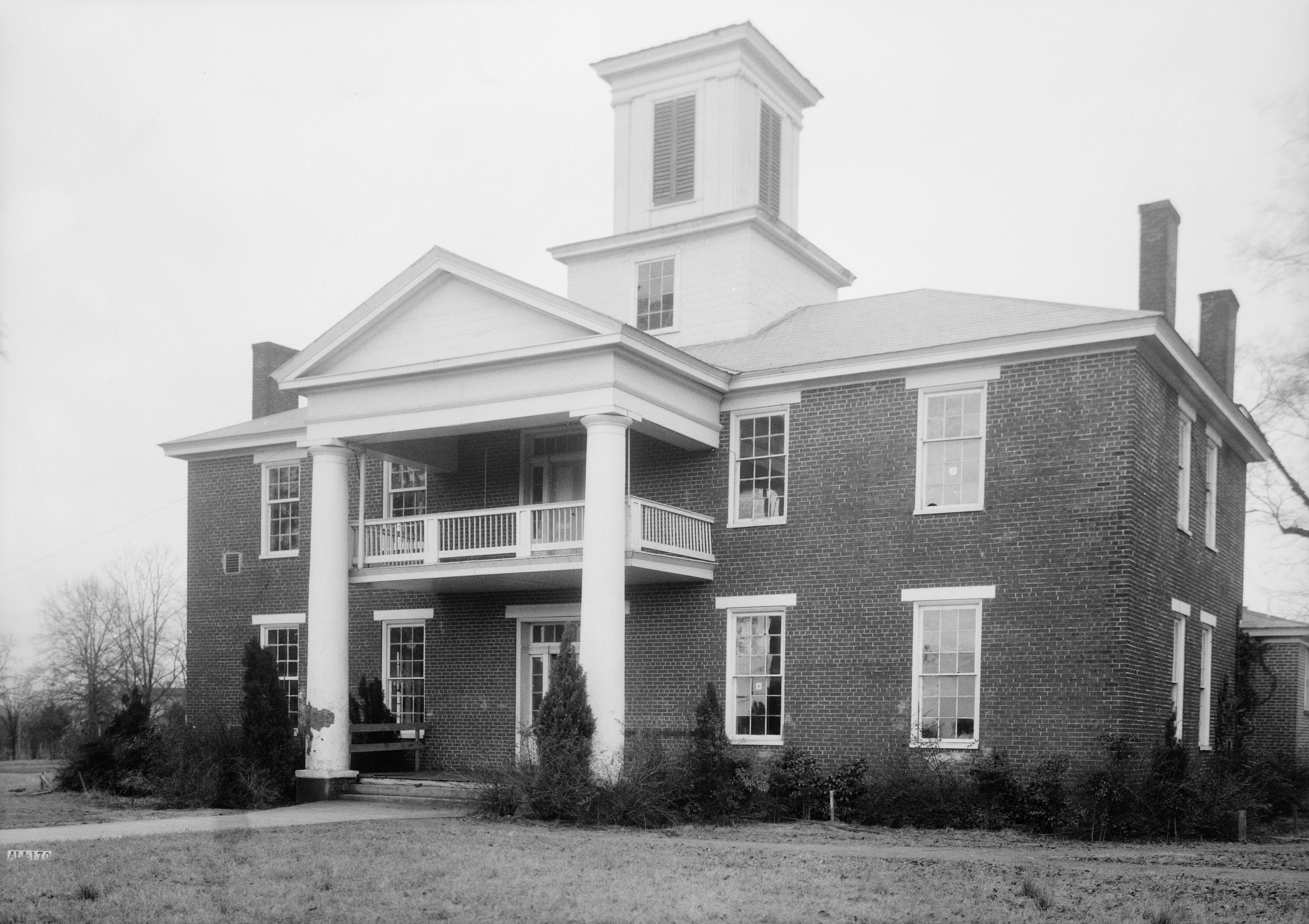
Front elevation

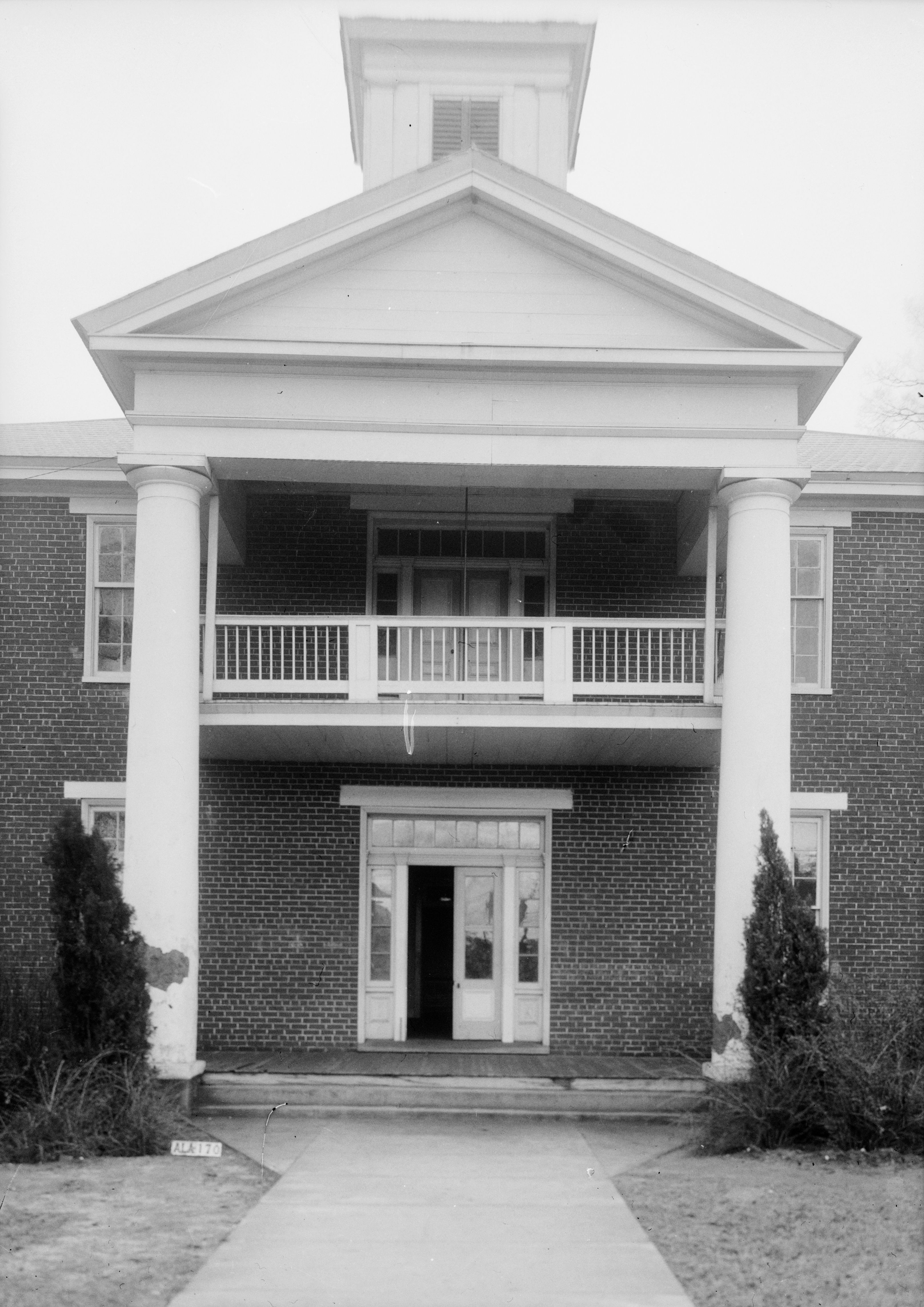
Close-up of main entrance

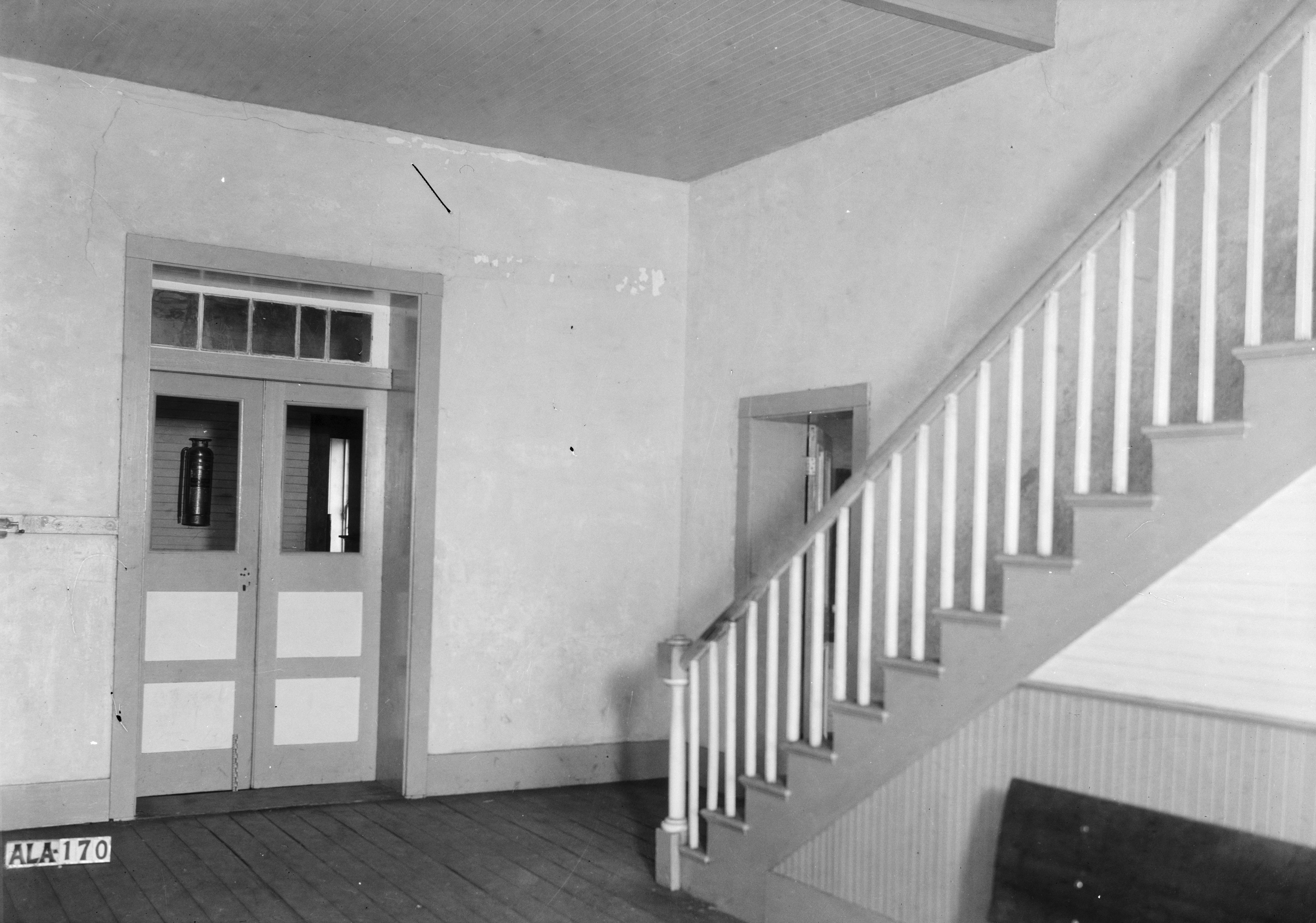
Staircase in the first floor hallway

== See also ==
- National Register of Historic Places listings in Wilcox County, Alabama
