= Philip Phillips (lawyer) =

American politician

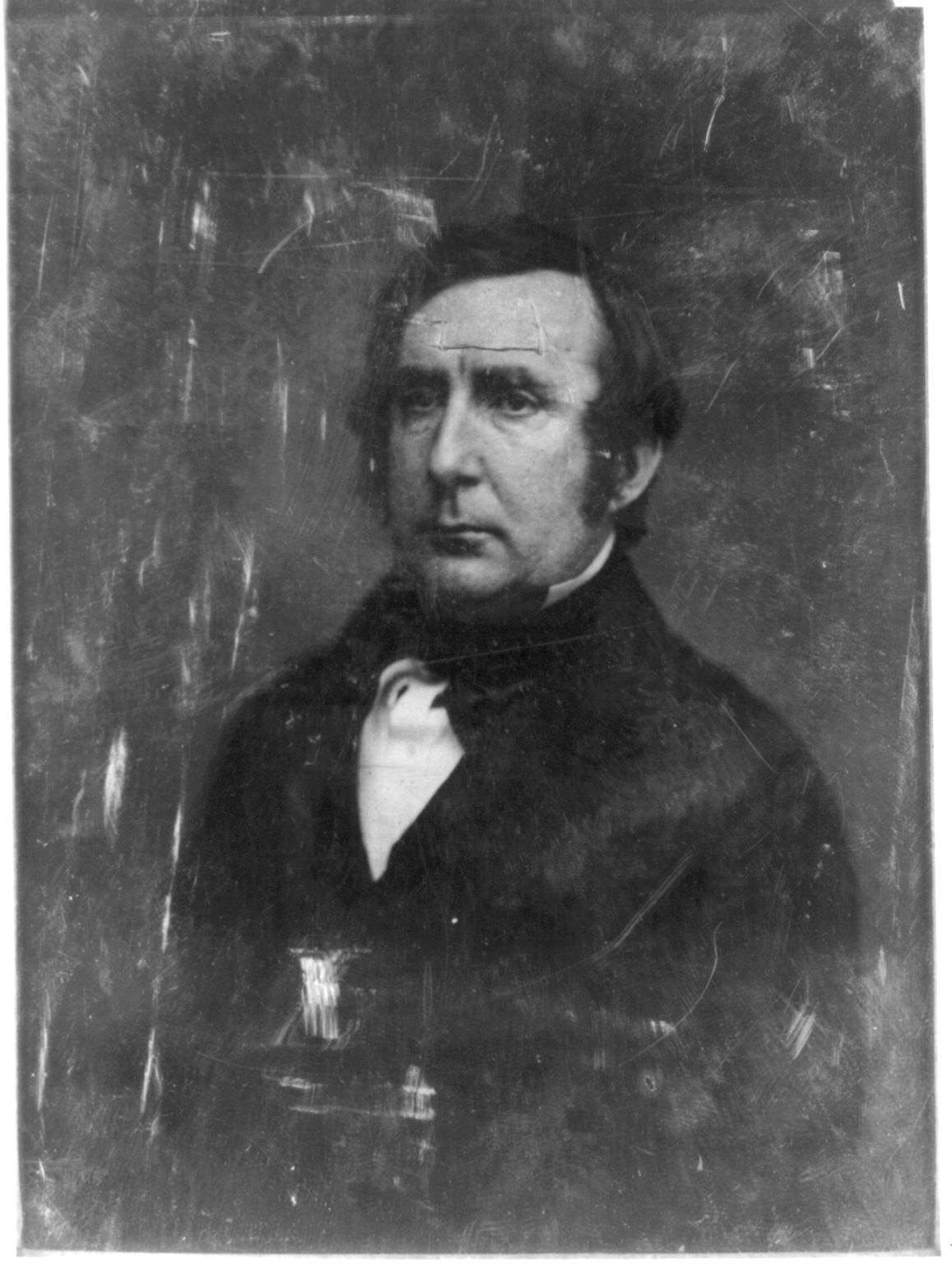

Member of the U.S. House of Representatives from Alabama's 1st district
- In office March 4, 1853 – March 3, 1855
- Preceded by: John Bragg
- Succeeded by: Percy Walker

Member of the Alabama House of Representatives
- In office 1845-1847

Member of the South Carolina General Assembly
- In office 1834-1836

Personal details
- Born: December 13, 1807 Charleston, South Carolina, U.S.
- Died: January 14, 1884 (aged 76) Washington, D.C., U.S.
- Resting place: Laurel Grove Cemetery
- Party: Democratic
- Spouse: Eugenia Levy

Philip Phillips (December 13, 1807 – January 14, 1884) was an American lawyer and politician from Cheraw, South Carolina, Mobile, Alabama, and Washington, D.C. He was a member of the Democratic Party who served as the U.S. representative from Alabama. Subsequently, he was a prominent lawyer in Washington, D.C., much involved in the political events surrounding the American Civil War.

== Family and early life ==
Philip Phillips was born December 13, 1807, in Charleston, South Carolina, the son of Aaron Phillips and Caroline Lazarus, prominent members of the Jewish community there. His father had changed his name from Pfeiffer when he immigrated around 1800 from Ansbach, Bavaria. The family were members of the Congregation Kahal Kadosh Beth Elohim in Charleston, and in 1825, Aaron Phillips was the first president of the Reformed Society of Israelites, early leaders in the Jewish Reform movement. Philip Phillips's mother Caroline was the daughter of Marks Lazarus, a Sephardic Jewish veteran of Fort Moultrie, the siege of Savannah, and the siege of Charleston in the American Revolution. He was held as a British prisoner of war.

Educated at the Middletown Military Academy in Middletown, Connecticut, Phillips was a roommate of Thomas H. Seymour, later the "hero of Chapultepec," Governor of Connecticut, Ambassador to Russia, and opponent of military action against the South. Phillips returned to Charleston in 1825, where he studied law under John Gadsden, the U.S. District Attorney. He was admitted to the South Carolina Bar in 1829. He began his legal practice at the town of Cheraw, South Carolina, living with his uncle, Joshua Lazarus.

== Political career ==
From Cheraw, Phillips rode the circuit of the local courthouses, becoming the partner of John Coit. During the controversy in South Carolina regarding the Tariff of 1832, he was among the leaders in rallying what is now known as Chesterfield County to the Union cause, in opposition to nullification. He was a member of the Nullification Convention in the Nullification Crisis of 1832 and continued to represent Chesterfield County in the South Carolina General Assembly in 1834/35.

In 1835, Phillips began the practice of law at Mobile, Alabama, at a time when many South Carolinians were moving to that state. A year later, he returned to Charleston to marry Eugenia Levy, the sister of Phoebe Levy Pember. He was elected to the Alabama Legislature in 1844 and was Chairman of the Committee on Federal Relations. In 1840 and 1846, he published a digest of the decisions of the Supreme Court of Alabama, and in 1849, he was elected Chairman of the State Convention called for the purpose of promoting internal improvements.

A delegate to the 1852 Democratic National Convention at Baltimore, Maryland, Phillips gave a speech in support of Franklin Pierce who received the nomination. In 1852, Phillips was elected as U.S. Representative from Alabama's 1st congressional district to the 33rd U.S. Congress. There he was closely associated with Stephen A. Douglas and largely responsible for the final language of the portion of the notorious Kansas-Nebraska Act that specified that the Missouri Compromise of 1820 be "inoperative and void" for Kansas and Nebraska, but not technically repealed. In his memoirs Phillips recognized that this action probably "hastened the crises of 1861."

== Civil War ==
Phillips declined reelection to U.S. House, but remained at Washington, and continued his legal practice there. When the Civil War began he, being a Unionist, attempted to remain. However, his wife, Eugenia, was quite obviously a Southern sympathizer and Confederate spy, of which she boasted in family papers. In August 1861, U.S. soldiers entered his house, confiscated his papers, arrested his wife and older daughters, and imprisoned them at the home of Mrs. Rose Greenhow. Fortunately, he had previously secured the friendship of Edwin M. Stanton, later Secretary of War, who, aided by other prominent Union leaders, arranged for their parole and transportation to the South. After a harrowing trip and a supposed delivery of information to President Jefferson Davis and other Confederate leaders in Richmond, Virginia, they passed on to Savannah, Georgia and ultimately to the expected safety of New Orleans, Louisiana.

Within a few months, New Orleans was captured by Admiral David Farragut and General Benjamin Butler. Soon his wife, Eugenia, who laughed at and mocked a Union soldier's funeral cortege, was arrested again and treated as a repeat offender, sent to a prison on Ship Island for three months. Upon her release in October 1862, again securing permission to leave Union-held territory, the family purchased a small house at LaGrange, Georgia where they lived for the remainder of the war.

After the war Phillips resumed his law practice, first in New Orleans and finally in 1867, after the Supreme Court voided the Test Oath of 1862, in Washington, D.C.. There he gradually became one of the leaders of the Bar, drawing most of his clients from the South. He generally practiced as a lawyer's lawyer, almost entirely before the U.S. Supreme Court, and appeared in over 400 cases.

== Death and legacy ==
Phillips died January 14, 1884, in Washington, D.C. and is buried in Laurel Grove Cemetery in Savannah, Georgia. He achieved a solid reputation as a thoughtful moderate among the leading national figures of his day. Being a Southern Unionist, he had the opportunity, according to at least one biographer, to have had a career comparable to the career of U.S. President Andrew Johnson. This was complicated by his religion, and it was made impossible by the unrestrained activities of his wife.

== Public offices ==
Office	Type	Location	Party	Elected	Took office	Left office	Notes
State House	Legislature	Columbia			1834	1836	South Carolina
State House	Legislature	Montomery			1845	1847	Alabama
U.S. House	Legislature	Washington	Democratic	1852	March 4, 1853	March 3, 1855	

== See also ==
- List of Jewish members of the United States Congress

== Bibliography ==
- Hagy, James William. (1993). This Happy Land, The Jews of Colonial and Antebellum Charleston. The University of Alabama Press. ISBN 0-8173-0576-9.
- Rosen, Robert N. (2000). The Jewish Confederates. University of South Carolina Press. ISBN 1-57003-363-3.
- Freehling, William W. (1990). The Road to Disunion, Secessionists at Bay 1776-1854. Oxford University Press. ISBN 0-19-505814-3.
- Phillips, Philip. (1876). "Autobiography of Philip Phillips". Southern Historical Collection, University of North Carolina Library. Phillips-Myers.
- United States Congress. "Philip Phillips (id: P000311)". Biographical Directory of the United States Congress.

U.S. House of Representatives
Preceded by John Bragg	Member of the U.S. House of Representatives from Alabama's 1st congressional district March 4, 1853 – March 3, 1855	Succeeded by Percy Walker
