= Phoebe Pember =

American nurse

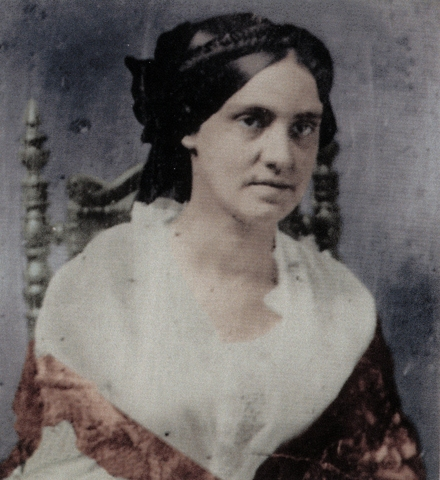
Phoebe Pember, circa 1855

Phoebe Yates Levy Pember (August 18, 1823 – March 4, 1913) was an American nurse and female administrator of Chimborazo Hospital at Richmond, Virginia. She was from a prominent Jewish family from Charleston, South Carolina. She assumed the responsibility informally at the age of 39 and eventually over 15,000 patients came under her direct care during the war.

== Family and early life ==
Pember was born on August 18, 1823, and raised in Charleston, South Carolina. The fourth of seven children, she was raised in a wealthy and socially prominent Jewish family; her father, Jacob Clavius Levy (son of Moses Levy of Charleston), was a successful merchant, while her mother, Fanny Yates, was the seventh and youngest daughter of Samuel Yates and Martha Abrahams. One of Pember's sisters, Eugenia Levy, married lawyer and congressman Philip Phillips, and would later be twice imprisoned for her support of the Confederate cause. Exemplifying the way in which wealth enabled some antebellum Jewish families to gain full community acceptance, the Levy family moved among Charleston's elite until a series of financial setbacks sent them to Savannah, Georgia, in the late 1840s.

== Marriage ==
Pember apparently received some formal schooling before her 1856 marriage to Bostonian Thomas Pember, who was not Jewish. He died soon after their marriage and by late 1861 she was a childless widow, living with her parents in Marietta, Georgia, where they had fled to escape the ravages of war. Unhappy at home, Pember accepted an invitation to serve at Richmond's Chimborazo Hospital. She reported for duty in December 1862.

== The Civil War ==
A sprawling institution on the outskirts of the city, Chimborazo was reportedly the largest military hospital in the world in the 1860s. By the end of the Civil War, the hospital had cared for some 76,000 patients. Pember served as Chief Matron of one of the facility's five divisions. It was an unusual job for a woman, at a time when virtually all nursing was done by men. Pember's varied duties surely required what one of her contemporaries described as her "will of steel under a suave refinement." Although Pember had to thwart efforts by her staff to pilfer supplies, once reportedly threatening a would-be thief with a gun, she also seems to have been accepted and valued by patients. Lacking adequate food, medicine, and other supplies, often that warm presence was the best that Pember and her staff could offer. Although she dedicated herself to relieving the suffering of soldiers, she was often simply a final companion for the dying.

Despite discrimination, she became responsible for the rationing of whiskey—considered a vital medicine—among her many other duties. She kept a pistol handy to deal with resentful men trying to steal her whiskey. Before the allotment became her charge, she wrote in her memoir: "daily inspection... convinced me that great evils still existed under my rule, in spite of my zealous care for my patients. For example, the monthly barrel of whiskey which I was entitled to draw still remained at the dispensary under the guardianship of the apothecary and his clerks, and quarts and pints were issued through any order coming from surgeons under their substitutes, so that the contents were apt to be gone long before I was entitled to draw more, and my sick would suffer for want of the stimulant." Young surgeons continued to try to remove the barrel from her quarters, but she did have the support of her noncommissioned officers and congressional law on her side. "The monthly barrel was an institution and a very important one," Pember wrote. "Indeed, if it is necessary to have a hero for this matter-of-fact narrative the whiskey barrel will have to step forward and make his bow." Whiskey helped keep men alive, and Pember did everything in her power to make sure the "tempted" surgeons never got their hands on it.

Pember remained at Chimborazo until the Confederate surrender in April 1865. She published her memoir soon after the war, in March 1866, serialized in a Baltimore magazine called The Cosmopolite as "Reminiscences of A Southern Hospital. By Its Matron." The memoir would later be published in book form as A Southern Woman's Story: Life in Confederate Richmond, in 1879.

=== Pember's memoir ===
There are differences between the book and magazine version: Pember deletes many place names in the book; Pember used much more critical language when describing prominent figures in the magazine; the magazine version is also conspicuously devoid of a major editing effort. The memoir, which details her daily life through anecdotes of the war years, remains one of the best sources for understanding the experiences and ideas of upper-class Southern Jewish women before and during the Civil War. In the memoir, Pember recounts the hostility towards her from male doctors at Chimborazo Hospital.

== Death and legacy ==
Following the Civil War, Pember maintained her elite social status, and traveled extensively through the United States and Europe. In her last years she lived with her niece, Fanny Phillips Hill in Pittsburgh, Pennsylvania, and died on March 4, 1913, of breast cancer at the age of 89. She is buried in Laurel Grove Cemetery in Savannah, Georgia.

Pember's childhood home in Charleston was a bed and breakfast (now closed) located at 26 Society Street. The portrait used in the literature is a Sully portrait of her mother, Phoebe Yates Levy.
