= William J. Alston =

American politician (1800–1876)

William Jeffreys Alston

Member of the U.S. House of Representatives from Alabama's 1st district
- In office March 4, 1849 – March 3, 1851
- Preceded by: John Gayle
- Succeeded by: John Bragg

Member of the Alabama House of Representatives
- In office 1836–1837

Member of the Alabama Senate
- In office 1839-1842

Personal details
- Born: December 31, 1800 Petersburg, Georgia
- Died: June 10, 1876 (aged 75) Magnolia, Alabama
- Party: Whig Democratic
- Spouse(s): Martha Cade; Harriet Harwell; Caroline Hainsworth; Mary Glover Shields
- Education: Litchfield Law School

William Jeffreys Alston (December 31, 1800 – June 10, 1876) was an American politician and a United States representative from Alabama.

== Biography ==
Alston was born near Petersburg in what is now Elbert County, Georgia, to Nathaniel Alston and Mary Grey Jeffreys Alston. His parents moved soon after his birth to Abbeville District, South Carolina, where he was taught by Moses Waddell. He and his parents moved to Alabama in 1818, eventually settling at McKinley in Marengo County. He began reading law in 1821 and attended the Litchfield Law School in 1824.

Married four times, Alston had a total of ten children. His first marriage was to Martha Cade in 1824. They had seven children together. After Martha died in 1846, he married Harriet Harwell in 1847, with whom he had one son. His third marriage was to a widow, Mrs. Caroline Hainsworth Cheney. They had no surviving issue. Alston's fourth marriage was to another widow, Mrs. Mary Glover Shields Lowry, in 1867, and they had two sons together.

Alston was a slave owner.

== Career ==
Following the completion of his education, he moved to Linden and established a law practice there. He went on to serve as judge of the Marengo County Court for several years. Originally a Whig and later a Democrat, he served several terms as a county judge, multiple terms as an Alabama senator and representative, and one term as a United States representative.

Alston was elected a member of the Alabama House of Representatives from 1836 to 1837. He served in the Alabama Senate from 1839 to 1842. He returned to the Alabama House in 1843. He served at the national level when elected as a Whig to the Thirty-first Congress, holding office from March 4, 1849, to March 3, 1851. He was not a candidate for renomination in 1850 and resumed the practice of his profession. Now running as a Democrat, Alston again became a member of the Alabama House from 1855 to 1857.

After serving his last term in the Alabama House, he retired from public life and moved to Magnolia, where he owned a large plantation.

== Death ==
Alston died in Magnolia, Marengo County, Alabama, on June 10, 1876 (age 75 years, 162 days). He was interred at Magnolia Cemetery in Magnolia.

U.S. House of Representatives
Preceded by John Gayle	Member of the U.S. House of Representatives from Alabama's 1st congressional district March 4, 1849 – March 3, 1851	Succeeded by John Bragg
