= Oak Hill Historic District (Oak Hill, Alabama) =

Historic district in Alabama, United States

- U.S. National Register of Historic Places
- U.S. Historic district
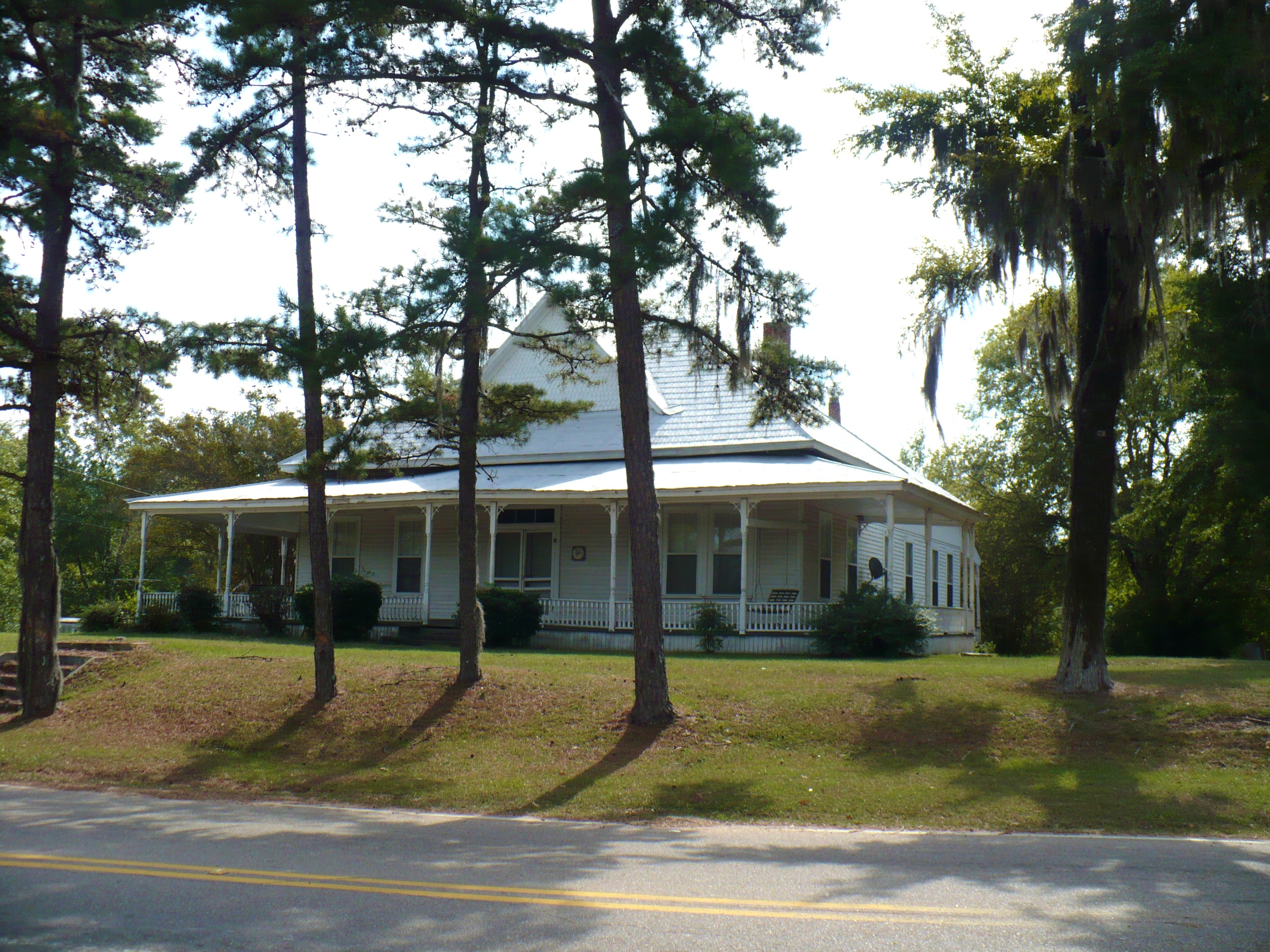
- A Queen Anne style house in the district in 2010

- Location within Alabama Location within the United States
- Location: Oak Hill, Alabama
- Coordinates: 31°55′19″N 87°5′1″W
- Architectural style: Mid 19th Century Revival, Late Victorian
- NRHP reference No.: 98000711
- Added to NRHP: June 26, 1998

The Oak Hill Historic District is a historic district in the community of Oak Hill, Alabama, United States. It was placed on the National Register of Historic Places on June 26, 1998. The district is roughly centered on the intersection of AL 10 and AL 21. It contains 6,750 acres (2,730 ha), 56 buildings, and seven structures with the architectural styles ranging from mid-19th century revival to Victorian.
