= Coy, Alabama =

Unincorporated community in Alabama, United States

- Unincorporated community
- Location within the state of Alabama Coy, Alabama (the United States)
- Coordinates: 31°53′42″N 87°27′46.8″W
- Country: United States
- State: Alabama
- County: Wilcox
- Elevation: 95 ft (29 m)
- Time zone: UTC-6 (Central (CST))
  - Summer (DST): UTC-5 (CDT)
- ZIP code: 36435
- Area code: 334

Coy is an unincorporated community in Wilcox County, Alabama, United States. Coy is located in a bend of the Alabama River and is home to several historic plantations. The most notable of these is Dry Fork Plantation, included on the National Register of Historic Places.

== Geography ==
Coy is located at 31.8950°N 87.4630°W and has an elevation of 95 feet (29 m).

== Notable person ==
- John Cooper Godbold, United States circuit judge for the United States Court of Appeals for the Eleventh Circuit, was born in Coy.
