= John Bragg (politician) =

American politician

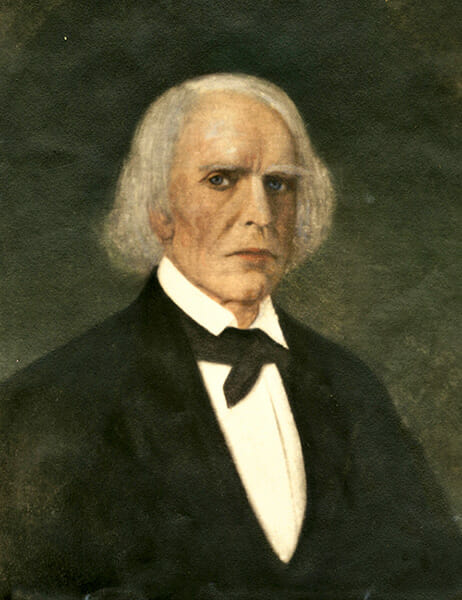
- Portrait of John Bragg, (Alabama Department of Archives and History)

Member of the U.S. House of Representatives from Alabama's 1st district
- In office March 4, 1851 – March 3, 1853
- Preceded by: William J. Alston
- Succeeded by: Philip Phillips

Member of the North Carolina House of Commons
- In office 1830-1834

Personal details
- Born: January 14, 1806 Warrenton, North Carolina
- Died: August 10, 1878 (aged 72) Mobile, Alabama
- Party: Democratic

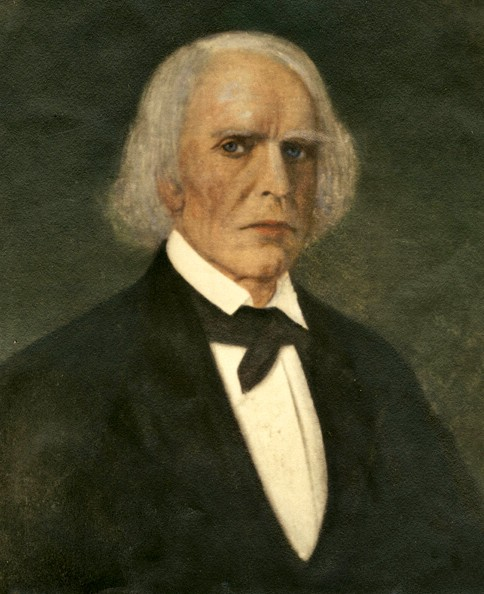
Congressman John Bragg

John Bragg (January 14, 1806 – August 10, 1878) was a U.S. representative from Alabama.

Born near Warrenton, North Carolina, Bragg attended the local academy at Warrenton, and was graduated from the University of North Carolina at Chapel Hill in 1824. He studied law. He was admitted to the bar in 1830 and commenced practice in Warrenton. He served as member of the North Carolina House of Commons 1830–1834. He moved to Mobile, Alabama, in 1836 and continued the practice of law. He was appointed judge of the tenth judicial circuit in 1842. He served as member of the State house of representatives. He was Mary Frances Hall in Lowndes County.

Bragg was elected as a Democrat to the Thirty-second Congress (March 4, 1851 – March 3, 1853). He led C.C. Langdon, a Unionist candidate. He declined to be a candidate for reelection in 1852. He resumed the practice of his profession. He built a home in Mobile in 1855 that is known today as the Bragg-Mitchell Mansion. He served as delegate from Mobile to the State constitutional convention in 1861. He lived in Lowndes County during the Civil War. He died in Mobile, Alabama, August 10, 1878. He was interred in Magnolia Cemetery.

U.S. House of Representatives
Preceded by William J. Alston	Member of the U.S. House of Representatives from Alabama's 1st congressional district 1851-1853	Succeeded by Philip Phillips
