= Dry Fork Plantation =

Historic house in Alabama, United States

- Dry Forks Plantation
- U.S. National Register of Historic Places
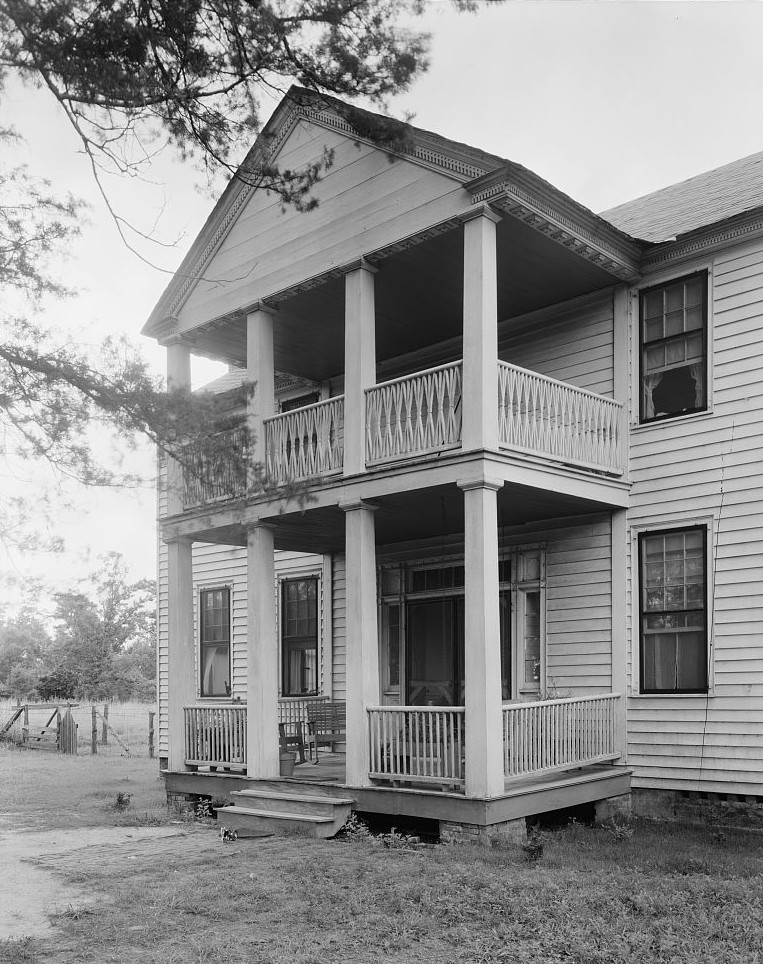
- Front portico of Dry Fork in 1939

- Location within Alabama Location within the United States
- Nearest city: Coy, Alabama
- Coordinates: 31°54′7″N 87°21′39″W
- Built: 1834
- Architect: Hezekiah; Tait, James, et al.
- Architectural style: Early Republic
- NRHP reference No.: 99000250
- Added to NRHP: February 26, 1999

Dry Fork Plantation, also known as James Asbury Tait House, is a historic plantation house in Coy, Alabama. The two-story wood-frame house was built between 1832 and 1834 in a vernacular interpretation of Federal style architecture. It was built for James Asbury Tait by two enslaved African Americans, Hezekiah and Elijah. The floor plan is centered on a hall that separates four rooms, two on each side, on both floors. Tait recorded in his daybook that the house required 25,000 board feet (59 m^{3}) of lumber, the roof was covered with 6,000 wooden shingles, and the chimneys and foundation required 12,000 bricks, made from clay on the plantation. Dry Fork is one of the oldest houses still standing in Wilcox County and remains in the Tait family. It was added to the National Register of Historic Places on February 26, 1999, with the name of Dry Forks Plantation.
