= William King Beck House =

Historic house in Alabama, United States

- U.S. National Register of Historic Places
- U.S. Historic district
- Alabama Register of Landmarks and Heritage
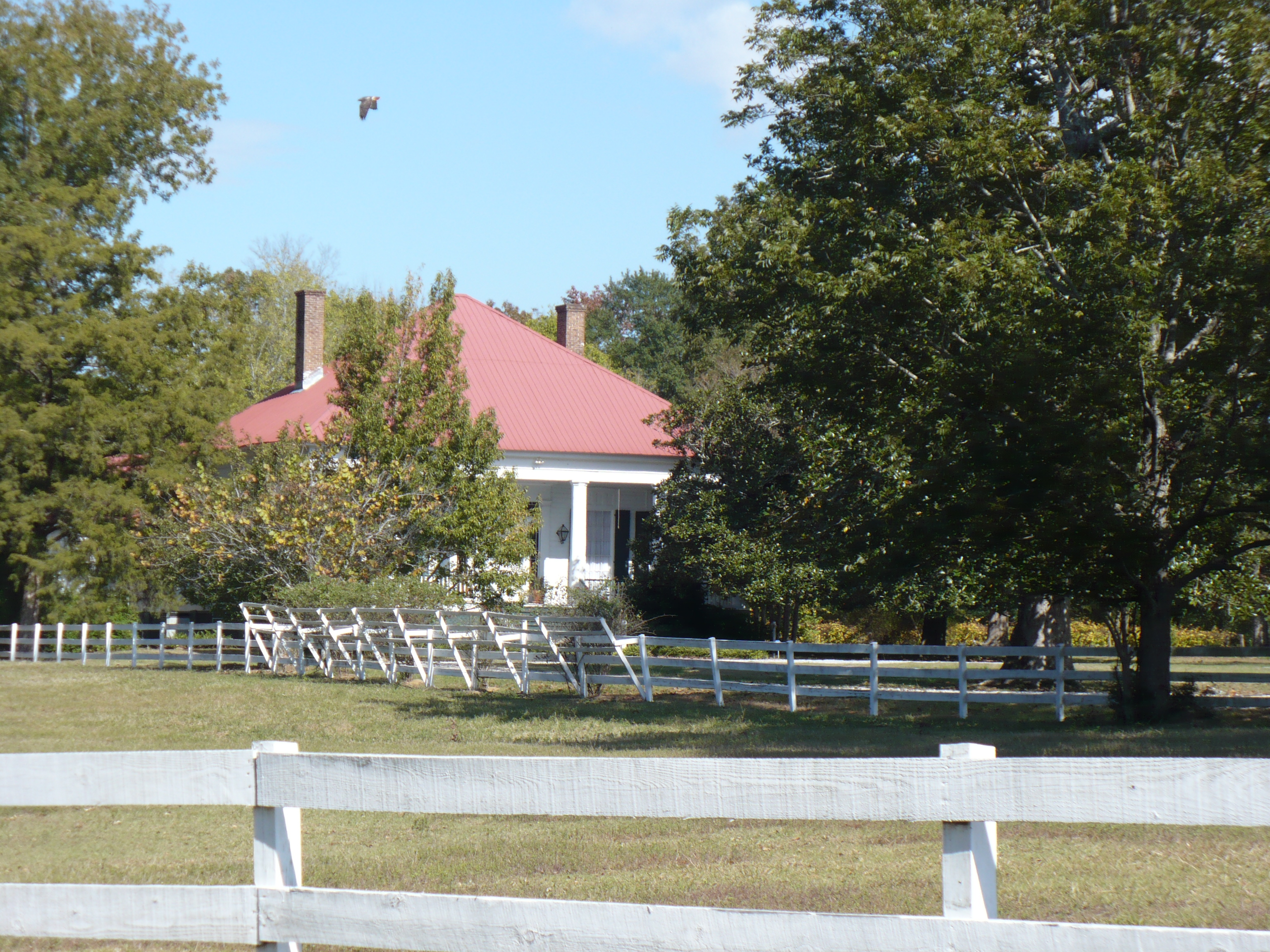
- The William King Beck House in 2008.

- Location within Alabama Location within the United States
- Nearest city: Camden, Alabama
- Coordinates: 32°2′44″N 87°20′7″W
- Built: 1845
- Architect: Alexander J. Bragg
- NRHP reference No.: 93000421

Significant dates
- Added to NRHP: May 21, 1993
- Designated ARLH: November 13, 1996

The William King Beck House, also known as River Bluff Plantation, is a historic plantation house on the Alabama River near Camden, Alabama. The main house was built in 1845 for William King Beck and is attributed to architect Alexander J. Bragg. William King Beck was an attorney from North Carolina who migrated to Wilcox County in the 1820s. He was the nephew of William Rufus King, the 13th Vice President of the United States.

The house is a one-story wood-frame building with six octagonal columns supporting a full-width front porch under the main roof. It is an example of the Greek Revival Cottage style. The roof line was altered in the late 19th century, when the original hipped roof was replaced with a pyramidal type. The house was added to the National Register of Historic Places on May 21, 1993.
