= Wilcox County Courthouse Historic District =

Historic district in Alabama, United States

- U.S. National Register of Historic Places
- U.S. Historic district
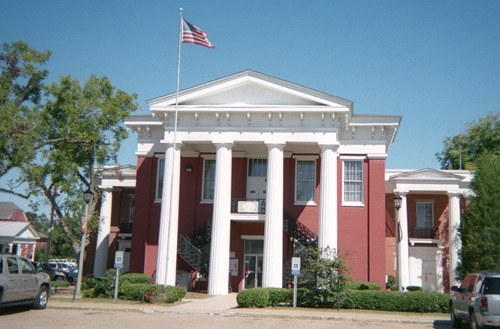
- Wilcox County Courthouse, built in 1857

- Location within Alabama Location within the United States
- Location: Camden, Alabama
- Coordinates: 31°59′28″N 87°17′21″W
- Architectural style: Greek Revival, Late Victorian
- NRHP reference No.: 79000405
- Added to NRHP: January 18, 1979

The Wilcox County Courthouse Historic District is a historic district in Camden, Alabama. It follows an irregular pattern along Broad Street, centered on the Wilcox County Courthouse. The Wilcox County Courthouse was built in 1857 in the Greek Revival style and remains in use today. Alexander J. Bragg was the contractor. The district contains other examples of Greek Revival, Victorian, and vernacular styles of architecture. It was added to the National Register of Historic Places on January 18, 1979.
