= Hawthorne House (Pine Apple, Alabama) =

Historic house in Alabama, United States

- U.S. National Register of Historic Places
- Alabama Register of Landmarks and Heritage
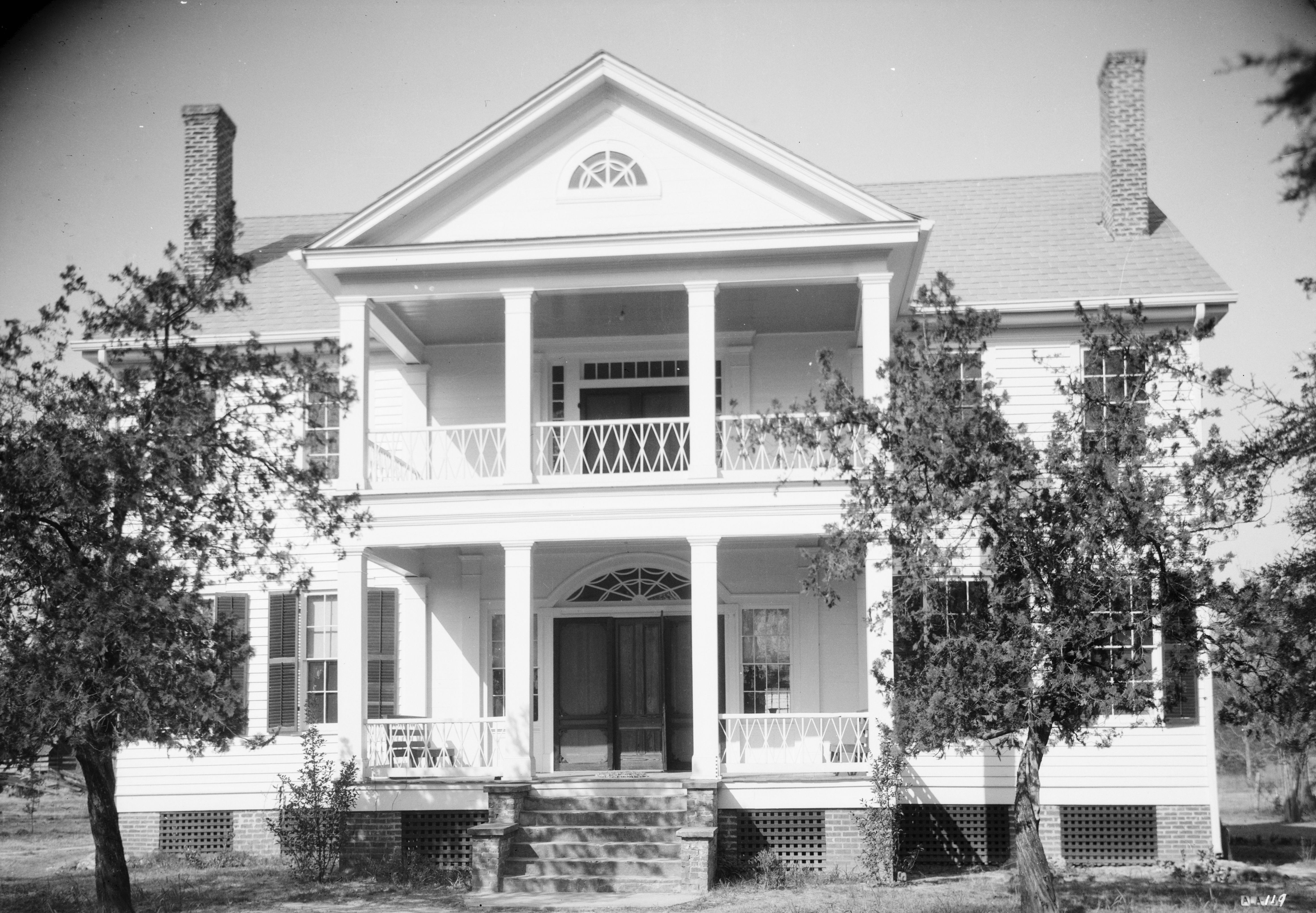
- The Hawthorne House as recorded by the HABS in 1937.

- Location within Alabama Location within the United States
- Location: Pine Apple, Alabama
- Coordinates: 31°52′48″N 86°59′21″W
- Built: 1854
- Architect: Plumb, Ezra
- NRHP reference No.: 85000452

Significant dates
- Added to NRHP: March 7, 1985
- Designated ARLH: November 9, 1992

The Hawthorne House, also known as the Col. J. R. Hawthorne House, is a historic plantation house in Pine Apple, Alabama, US. The house was added to the Alabama Register of Landmarks and Heritage on November 9, 1992, and to the National Register of Historic Places on March 7, 1985, with the name of Hawtorn House.

== History ==
The two-story wood-frame house was built in 1854 for Joseph Richard Hawthorne by Ezra Plumb. Joseph Hawthorne was born in 1805 in North Carolina, but the family had relocated to Wilkinson County, Georgia by 1810. Hawthorne moved to Conecuh County, Alabama in the 1830s and finally settled in Pine Apple in the 1850s. He owned several large plantations in Conecuh and Wilcox counties. He died in Pine Apple in 1889.

The house was sold out of the family after his death, but was brought back into the family when acquired in 1935 by Gladys Hawthorne Whitaker and her brother, Dr. Julian Hawthorne, a New York physician. The house was recorded by the Historic American Buildings Survey in 1937. They restored the house and it remained in the family until Mrs. Whitaker's death in 1980.

It was purchased after the death of Mrs. Whitaker by Dr. Edward Childs of Mobile.

== Gallery ==
The Hawthorne House as recorded by the Historic American Buildings Survey:

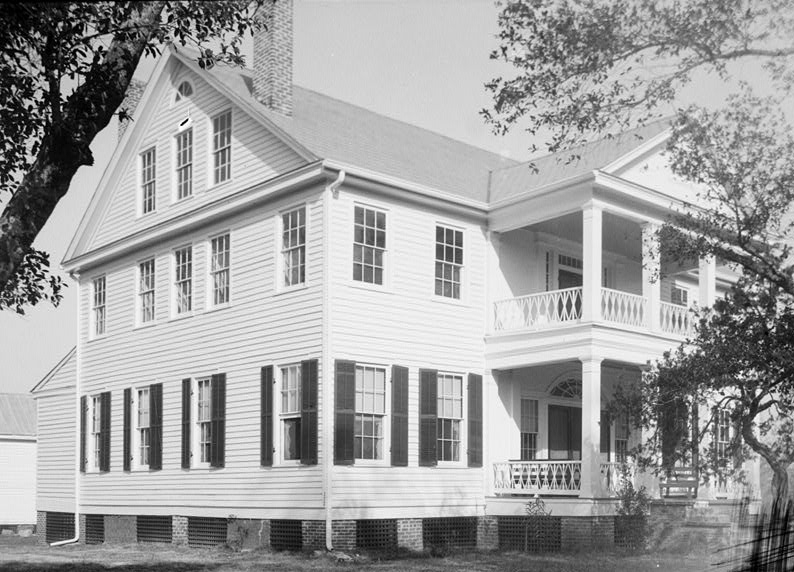
North (rear) and east elevation

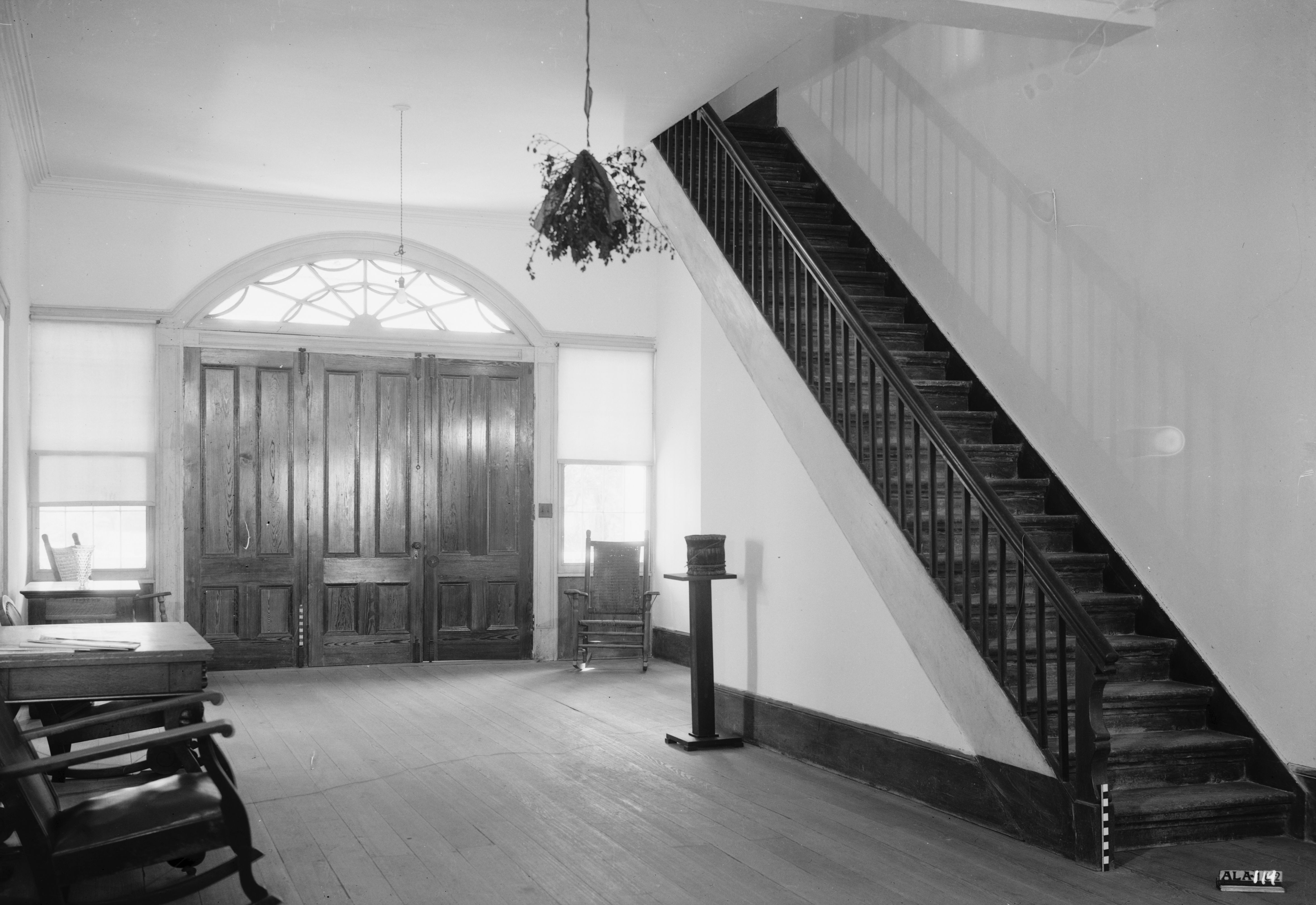
View of plasterwork and stairs

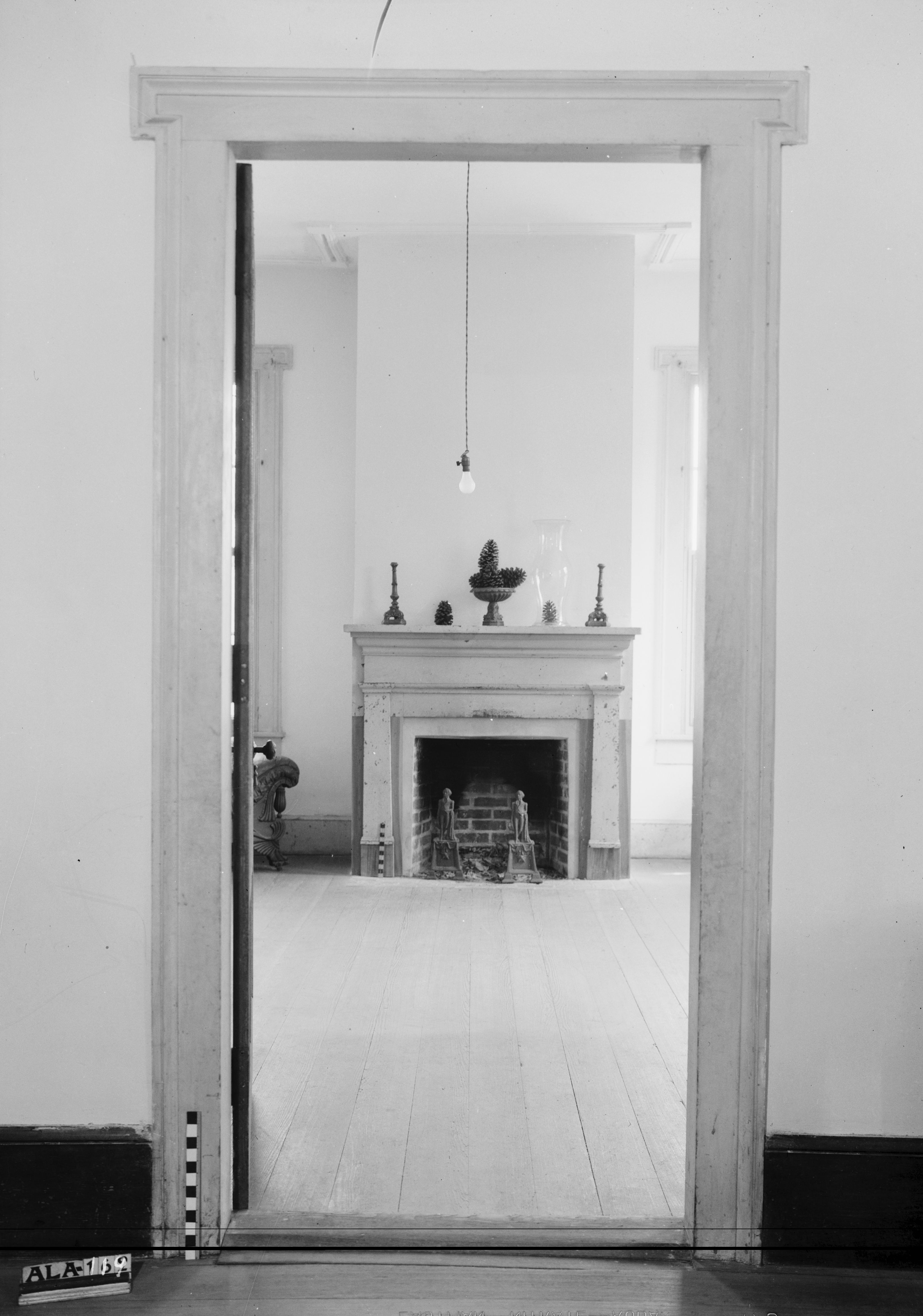
View of front hall
