= Pine Apple, Alabama =

Town in the United States

- Town
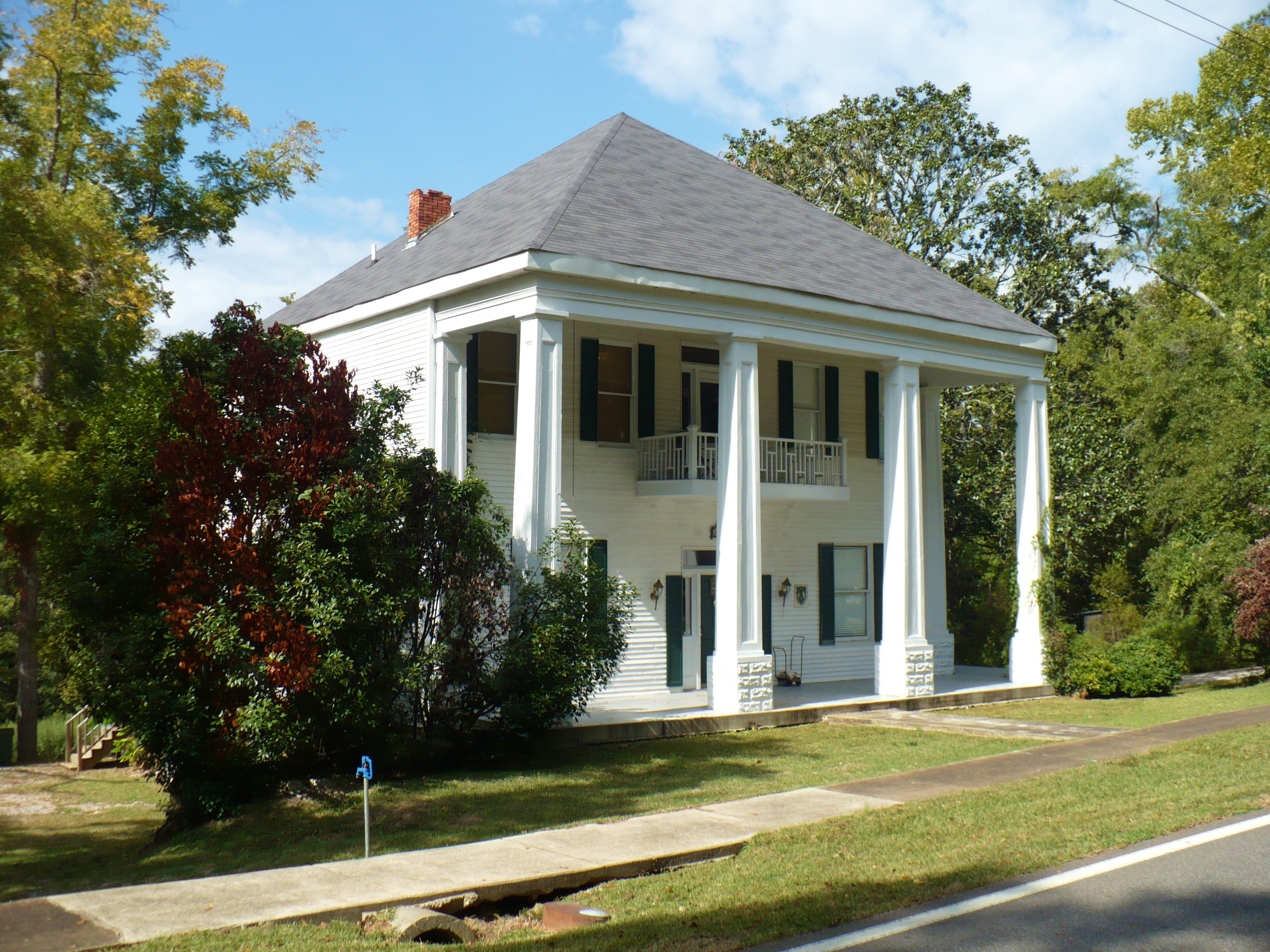
- A house in Pine Apple

- Location of Pine Apple in Wilcox County, Alabama.
- Coordinates: 31°52′30″N 86°59′45″W
- Country: United States
- State: Alabama
- County: Wilcox

Area
  - Total: 3.10 sq mi (8.03 km^{2})
  - Land: 3.10 sq mi (8.03 km^{2})
  - Water: 0 sq mi (0.00 km^{2})
- Elevation: 335 ft (102 m)

Population (2020)
  - Total: 143
  - Density: 46.1/sq mi (17.81/km^{2})
- Time zone: UTC-6 (Central (CST))
  - Summer (DST): UTC-5 (CDT)
- ZIP code: 36768
- Area code: 251
- FIPS code: 01-59880
- GNIS feature ID: 2407114

Pine Apple is a town in Wilcox County, Alabama, United States. It incorporated in 1872. Per the 2020 census, the population was 143. It has two places on the National Register of Historic Places, the Hawthorne House and the Pine Apple Historic District.

== History ==
Pine Apple was originally called Friendship, and under the latter name was laid out in 1825. The present name was given in 1852 on account of there being pine and apple groves near the town site.

== Geography ==
According to the U.S. Census Bureau, the town has a total area of 3.1 square miles (8.0 km^{2}), all land.

== Light pollution ==
The town of Pine Apple, along with nearby Oak Hill have the lowest light pollution of any incorporated municipality in Alabama with a 4.1 out of 9 on the Bortle scale. The reason for this is its small population and low population density, as well as it's remoteness compared to other municipalities with the nearest city being Camden, 19 miles (30.5 km) west, and the nearest major city being Montgomery 53 miles (85.3 km) east.

== Demographics ==
Historical population
Census	Pop.	Note	%±
1880	358		—
1890	520		45.3%
1900	623		19.8%
1910	627		0.6%
1920	464		−26.0%
1930	438		−5.6%
1940	455		3.9%
1950	445		−2.2%
1960	355		−20.2%
1970	347		−2.3%
1980	298		−14.1%
1990	365		22.5%
2000	145		−60.3%
2010	132		−9.0%
2020	143		8.3%
U.S. Decennial Census; 2010 2020

=== 2020 census ===
Pine Hill town, Alabama – Demographic Profile (NH = Non-Hispanic)
Race / Ethnicity	Pop 2010	Pop 2020	% 2010	% 2020
White alone (NH)	97	91	73.48%	63.64%
Black or African American alone (NH)	32	44	24.24%	30.77%
Native American or Alaska Native alone (NH)	1	0	0.76%	0.00%
Asian alone (NH)	1	0	0.76%	0.00%
Pacific Islander alone (NH)	1	2	0.76%	1.40%
Some Other Race alone (NH)	0	1	0.00%	0.70%
Mixed Race/Multi-Racial (NH)	0	2	0.00%	1.40%
Hispanic or Latino (any race)	0	3	0.00%	2.10%
Total	132	143	100.00%	100.00%

Note: the US Census treats Hispanic/Latino as an ethnic category. This table excludes Latinos from the racial categories and assigns them to a separate category. Hispanics/Latinos can be of any race.

=== 2000 Census ===
At the 2000 census there were 145 people, 65 households, and 44 families in the town. The population density was 46.8 inhabitants per square mile (18.1/km^{2}). There were 101 housing units at an average density of 32.6 per square mile (12.6/km^{2}). The racial makeup of the town was 62.76% White, 36.55% Black or African American, and 0.69% from two or more races. Of the 65 households 20.0% had children under the age of 18 living with them, 55.4% were married couples living together, 10.8% had a female householder with no husband present, and 32.3% were non-families. 32.3% of households were one person and 18.5% were one person aged 65 or older. The average household size was 2.23 and the average family size was 2.82.

The age distribution was 22.8% under the age of 18, 4.1% from 18 to 24, 22.8% from 25 to 44, 22.8% from 45 to 64, and 27.6% 65 or older. The median age was 45 years. For every 100 females, there were 81.3 males. For every 100 females age 18 and over, there were 80.6 males.

The median household income was $35,625 and the median family income was $44,583. Males had a median income of $29,583 versus $30,833 for females. The per capita income for the town was $16,876. There were 7.7% of families and 15.8% of the population living below the poverty line, including 35.9% of those under 18 and 14.3% of those over 64.

== Education ==
The sole school district in the county is the Wilcox County School District. The sole comprehensive high school of the district is Wilcox Central High School.

== Notable people ==
- Fred Cone - a former running back in the NFL for the Green Bay Packers and Dallas Cowboys.
- Kenneth R. Giddens - Broadcaster and Voice of America executive.
- Philemon T. Herbert - former U.S. Representative from California
